= Kardinal Offishall discography =

Canadian rapper

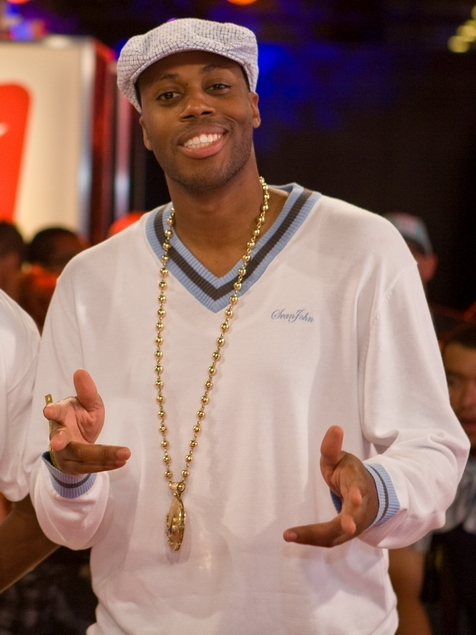
- Kardinal Offishall at a Toronto International Film Festival party in 2008.
- Studio albums: 5
- Extended plays: 1
- Singles: 33
- Music videos: 27
- Mixtapes: 5
- Collaborations: 104

Canadian rapper and record producer Kardinal Offishall has released five studio albums, one extended play (EP), thirty-three singles, and five mixtapes.

In 1997, Offishall released his debut album, Eye & I, on independent label Capitol Hill Music, to critical acclaim. In 2000, he released the EP, Husslin', also independently on Figure IV Entertainment, which helped establish him as one of Canada's best hip-hop producers. The same year, Kardinal signed with major label MCA Records, and released his second album Quest for Fire: Firestarter, Vol. 1 in 2001. The lead single, "BaKardi Slang", became his first single to appear on a US Billboard chart. After releasing the single "Belly Dancer" in 2003, he left MCA Records after it was absorbed by Geffen Records.

In 2005, Offishall released his third album, Fire and Glory, on the Canadian division of Virgin Records. The single "Everyday (Rudebwoy)" became a top twenty hit in Canada. In 2008, his fourth album Not 4 Sale was released on Kon Live Distribution, a subsidiary of Geffen Records. The album was a critical success, spawning the hit single "Dangerous". The single was his first to chart on the Billboard Hot 100, peaking at number five, and was certified triple platinum in Canada. In 2012, Offishall released A.M.T.R.I.M., a collaborative mixtape with producer Nottz. He released his fifth album, Kardi Gras, Vol. 1: The Clash, on his independent label Black Stone Colleagues Inc. and Universal Music Canada in 2015.

== Albums ==
=== Studio albums ===
List of studio albums, with selected chart positions and sales figures
| Title | Album details | Peak chart positions | | | | | Sales figures |
| Title | Album details | CAN | FRA | US | US R&B | US Rap | Sales figures |
|---|---|---|---|---|---|---|---|
| Eye & I | Released: December 9, 1997; Label: Capitol Hill; Formats: Cassette, CD | — | — | — | — | — | CAN: 4,000 (Note: Sales as of May 26, 1998.) |
| Quest for Fire: Firestarter, Vol. 1 | Released: May 22, 2001; Label: MCA; Formats: Cassette, CD, digital download, LP | 33 | — | — | 57 | — | CAN: 25,000 (Note: Sales as of July 7, 2002.) |
| Fire and Glory | Released: November 15, 2005; Label: EMI, Virgin; Formats: CD, digital download | 80 | — | — | — | — | |
| Not 4 Sale | Released: September 9, 2008; Label: Kon Live, Geffen; Formats: CD, digital download, LP | 8 | 105 | 40 | 10 | 7 | US: 34,800+ |
| Kardi Gras, Vol. 1: The Clash | Released: October 30, 2015; Label: Black Stone Colleagues, Universal; Formats: CD, digital download | — | — | — | — | — | |
| Firestarter Vol. 2: Everyday, Sometimes… | Released: September 25, 2026; Label: Self-released; Formats: CD, digital download, streaming | — | — | — | — | — | |
"—" denotes a recording that did not chart or was not released in that territory.

=== Mixtapes ===
List of mixtapes
| Title | Album details |
|---|---|
| Kill Bloodclott Bill | Released: 2004; Label: Self-released; Format: Digital download |
| Canadian Coke (with DJ Whoo Kid) | Released: 2006; Label: Howie McDuffie Music Group; Format: Digital download |
| Do the Right Thing (with Clinton Sparks) | Released: July 2, 2007; Label: Self-released; Format: Digital download |
| Limited Time Only (with Clinton Sparks) | Released: June 11, 2008; Label: Self-released; Format: Digital download |
| A.M.T.R.I.M. (with Nottz) | Released: June 15, 2012; Label: Self-released; Format: Digital download |

== Extended plays ==
List of extended plays
| Title | EP details |
|---|---|
| Husslin' | Released: April 11, 2000; Label: Fat Beats/Figure IV; Format: CD, vinyl, cassette |

== Singles ==
=== As lead artist ===
List of singles as a lead artist, with selected chart positions and certifications, showing year released and album name
| Title | Year | Peak chart positions | | | | | | | | | Certifications | Album |
| Title | Year | CAN | CAN CHR | AUS | FRA | GER | UK | US | US R&B | US Rap | Certifications | Album |
|---|---|---|---|---|---|---|---|---|---|---|---|---|
| "Naughty Dread" | 1996 | — | — | — | — | — | — | — | — | — | | Rap Essentials Volume One |
| "On wit da Show" | 1997 | 91 | — | — | — | — | — | — | — | — | | Eye & I |
| "And What?" (featuring Saukrates) | 1999 | — | — | — | — | — | — | — | — | — | | Husslin' |
| "Husslin'" | 2000 | 41 | — | — | — | — | — | — | — | — | | Husslin' |
| "BaKardi Slang" | 2001 | 19 | — | — | — | — | — | — | — (Note: "BaKardi Slang" did not enter the Hot R&B/Hip-Hop Songs chart, but peaked at number ten on the Bubbling Under R&B/Hip-Hop Singles chart.) | 37 | | Quest for Fire: Firestarter, Vol. 1 |
| "Ol' Time Killin'" (featuring Jully Black, Allistair, IRS and Wio-K) | 2001 | 32 | — | — | — | — | — | — | — | — | | Quest for Fire: Firestarter, Vol. 1 |
| "Belly Dancer" (featuring Pharrell Williams) | 2003 | — | — | — | — | — | — | — | 96 | — | | Non-album singles |
| "Sick!" (featuring Bounty Killer) | 2003 | — | — | — | — | — | — | — | — | — | | Non-album singles |
| "Empty Barrel" (featuring Blessed) | 2003 | — | — | — | — | — | — | — | — | — | | Non-album singles |
| "Tear de Wallz Down" | 2004 | — | — | — | — | — | — | — | — | — | | Non-album singles |
| "Bang Bang" | 2004 | — | — | — | — | — | — | — | — | — | | Non-album singles |
| "Heads Up" | 2005 | — | — | — | — | — | — | — | — | — | | Fire and Glory |
| "Everyday (Rudebwoy)" (featuring Ray Robinson) | 2005 | 16 | — | — | — | — | — | — | — | — | | Fire and Glory |
| "Feel Alright" | 2006 | 40 | — | — | — | — | — | — | — | — | | Fire and Glory |
| "Last Standing Soldier" (Bedouin Remix) (featuring Bedouin Soundclash) | 2006 | — | — | — | — | — | — | — | — | — | | Non-album singles |
| "Graveyard Shift" (featuring Akon) | 2007 | — | — | — | — | — | — | — | — | — | | Non-album singles |
| "Dangerous" (featuring Akon) | 2008 | 2 | 2 | 42 | 8 | 18 | 6 | 5 | 50 | 16 | MC: 4× Platinum; BPI: Gold; BVMI: Gold; RIAA: 3× Platinum; RMNZ: Platinum | Not 4 Sale |
| "Burnt" (featuring Lindo P) | 2008 | — | — | — | — | — | — | — | — | — | | Not 4 Sale |
| "Set It Off" (featuring Clipse) | 2008 | — | — | — | — | — | — | — | — | — | | Not 4 Sale |
| "Numba 1 (Tide Is High)" (featuring Keri Hilson or Rihanna) | 2008 | 38 | 13 | — | — | — | 84 | — | — | — | MC: Gold | Not 4 Sale |
| "Put Your Drinks Up" (with DJ Mad featuring Fatman Scoop) | 2009 | — | — | — | — | — | — | — | — | — | | Non-album singles |
| "Clear!" | 2009 | 57 | 24 | — | — | — | — | — | — | — | | Non-album singles |
| "We Gon' Go" (featuring Darryl Riley) | 2009 | — | — | — | — | — | — | — | — | — | | Non-album singles |
| "Body Bounce" (featuring Akon) | 2010 | 16 | 5 | — | — | — | — | — | — | — | MC: Platinum | Non-album singles |
| "The Anthem" | 2010 | — | — | — | — | — | — | — | — | — | | Non-album singles |
| "Smash the Club" (featuring Pitbull, Lil Jon and Clinton Sparks) | 2011 | — | — | — | — | — | — | — | — | — | | Non-album singles |
| "Anywhere (Ol' Time Killin' Part 2)" | 2011 | — | — | — | — | — | — | — | — | — | | Non-album singles |
| "Ignorant" | 2012 | — | — | — | — | — | — | — | — | — | | Non-album singles |
| "Reppin for My City (The Anthem, Pt. 2)" (featuring WizKid) | 2012 | — | — | — | — | — | — | — | — | — | | Non-album singles |
| "Turn It Up" (featuring Karl Wolf) | 2012 | 32 | — | — | — | — | — | — | — | — | | Non-album singles |
| "I'm a Star" (with DJ Snake featuring Quinn Marie) | 2014 | — | — | — | — | — | — | — | — | — | | Non-album singles |
| "That Chick Right There" (featuring Chaisson) | 2014 | 68 | 16 | — | — | — | — | — | — | — | | Kardi Gras, Vol. 1: The Clash |
| "Baby It's U!" | 2015 | — | — | — | — | — | — | — | — | — | | Kardi Gras, Vol. 1: The Clash |
| "Winner" (featuring Celebrity Maurauders, Joey Montana and Pree) | 2017 | — | — | — | — | — | — | — | — | — | | Non-album singles |
| "Run" | 2019 | — | — | — | — | — | — | — | — | — | | Non-album singles |
| "Where There's Smoke" | 2026 | — | — | — | — | — | — | — | — | — | | Firestarter Vol. 2: Everyday, Sometimes… |
| "My Brother's Keeper Part 2" (with Nesta) | 2026 | — | — | — | — | — | — | — | — | — | | Firestarter Vol. 2: Everyday, Sometimes… |
| "Kiss Me When I" (with Glenn Lewis) | 2026 | — | — | — | — | — | — | — | — | — | | Firestarter Vol. 2: Everyday, Sometimes… |
"—" denotes a recording that did not chart or was not released in that territory.

=== As featured artist ===
List of singles as a featured artist, with selected chart positions and certifications, showing year released and album name
| Title | Year | Peak chart positions | | | | | | | | | Certifications | Album |
| Title | Year | CAN | CAN CHR | AUS | GER | NLD | NZ | UK | US | US R&B | Certifications | Album |
|---|---|---|---|---|---|---|---|---|---|---|---|---|
| "Northern Touch" (Rascalz featuring Kardinal Offishall, Choclair, Checkmate and Thrust) | 1998 | 41 | — | — | — | — | — | — | — | — | | Cash Crop |
| "Money Jane" (Baby Blue Soundcrew featuring Kardinal Offishall, Sean Paul and Jully Black) | 2000 | 24 | — | — | — | — | — | — | — | — | | Private Party Collectors Edition |
| "Still Too Much" (Ghetto Concept featuring Kardinal Offishall, Maestro, Snow, Red-1 and Ironside) | 2001 | — | — | — | — | — | — | — | — | — | | Ghetto Concept Presents...7 Bills All-Stars: Da Album |
| "Back for More" (Glenn Lewis featuring Kardinal Offishall) | 2003 | — | — | — | — | — | — | — | — | 76 | | Non-album single |
| "Carnival Girl" (Texas featuring Kardinal Offishall) | 2003 | — | — | — | 94 | — | — | 9 | — | — | | Careful What You Wish For |
| "Let Me" (Melanie Durrant featuring Kardinal Offishall) | 2004 | 35 | — | — | — | — | — | — | — | — | | Non-album single |
| "Cowboy Film" (Taz featuring Kardinal Offishall) | 2004 | — | — | — | — | — | — | 90 | — | — | | Analyse This |
| "Bang Bang" (Melanie Durrant featuring Kardinal Offishall) | 2005 | 19 | — | — | — | — | — | — | — | — | | Where I'm Goin' |
| "Smoke & Mirrors" (Exile featuring Kardinal Offishall) | 2005 | — | — | — | — | — | — | — | — | — | | Dirty Science |
| "Ladies and Gentlemen" (Tyree featuring Kardinal Offishall and Deach) | 2006 | — | — | — | — | — | 24 | — | — | — | | Non-album single |
| "War" (Marco Polo featuring Kardinal Offishall) | 2007 | — | — | — | — | — | — | — | — | — | | Port Authority |
| "Tonight" (Baba Kahn featuring Kardinal Offishall, Sunny Brown and Lomaticc) | 2008 | — | — | — | — | — | — | — | — | — | | Culture Shock Two |
| "Beautiful" (Akon featuring Colby O'Donis and Kardinal Offishall) | 2009 | 16 | 4 | 14 | 34 | 24 | 13 | 8 | 19 | 61 | ARIA: 3× Platinum; BPI: Platinum; RIAA: 2× Platinum; RMNZ: Platinum | Freedom |
| "Put Your Hands on Me" (Crookers featuring Kardinal Offishall and Carla-Marie) | 2009 | — | — | — | — | 85 | — | — | — | — | | Tons of Friends |
| "Milkshakes & Razorblades" (illScarlett featuring Kardinal Offishall) | 2010 | — | — | — | — | — | — | — | — | — | | 1UP! |
| "Freak" (Estelle featuring Kardinal Offishall) | 2010 | 83 | — | — | — | — | — | 103 | — | — | | Step Up 3D soundtrack |
| "Wavin' Flag" (with Young Artists for Haiti) | 2010 | 1 | — | — | — | — | — | 104 | — | — | | Non-album single |
| "So Much" (Raghav featuring Kardinal Offishall) | 2010 | — | — | — | — | — | — | — | — | — | | The Phoenix |
| "Ghetto Love" (Karl Wolf featuring Kardinal Offishall) | 2011 | 20 | — | — | — | — | — | — | — | — | MC: Gold | Finally Free |
| "Love" (Mimoza Duot featuring Kardinal Offishall) | 2011 | — | — | — | — | — | — | — | — | — | | Non-album singles |
| "True Colors" (with Artists Against Bullying) | 2012 | — | — | — | — | — | — | — | — | — | | Non-album singles |
| "Stylechanger" (Eric Turner featuring Kardinal Offishall, Wretch 32 and Professor Green) | 2012 | — | — | — | — | — | — | — | — | — | | Eric Turner: The Life |
| "Can't Choose" (JRDN featuring Kardinal Offishall) | 2013 | — | 13 | — | — | — | — | — | — | — | | Non-album single |
| "Dearly Departed" (Maestro Fresh Wes featuring Kardinal Offishall) | 2013 | — | — | — | — | — | — | — | — | — | | Orchestrated Noise |
| "Baddest Chick" (Ian Carey and Doron featuring Ray J and Kardinal Offishall) | 2013 | — | — | — | — | — | — | — | — | — | | Non-album singles |
| "Do It Like" (Lucas DiPasquale featuring Stylo G, Kardinal Offishall and Koshens) | 2015 | — | — | — | — | — | — | — | — | — | | Non-album singles |
| "Amateur at Love" (Remix) (Karl Wolf featuring Kardinal Offishall) | 2016 | — | — | — | — | — | — | — | — | — | | Non-album singles |
| "Marching Bands" (Neon Dreams featuring Kardinal Offishall) | 2016 | 92 | 15 | — | — | — | — | — | — | — | | To You |
"—" denotes a recording that did not chart or was not released in that territory.

== Guest appearances ==
List of non-single guest appearances, with other performing artists, showing year released and album name
| Year | Title | Other performer(s) | Album |
|---|---|---|---|
| 1998 | "Northern Touch" | Rascalz, Checkmate, Thrust, Choclair | Cash Crop |
| 1998 | "Internal Affairs" | Choclair, Frankenstein, Marvel | Mad Fiber: The Toronto Hip-Hop Album |
| 1998 | "Rhyme, Shine & Buss" | YLook | Planet Mars EP |
| 1999 | "Gunnfinga" | Rascalz | Global Warning |
| 1999 | "S.O.T." | Choclair, Solitair | Ice Cold |
| 2000 | "Bustin' Loose (Remix)" | Maestro | Ever Since |
| 2000 | "The Backbone" | DJ Revolution, Chace Infinite, Choclair, Ill-Advised, Krondon, Planet Asia, Rasco, Shabaam Sahdeeq | In 12s We Trust |
| 2000 | "Careful (Click, Click) (Kardinal Remix)" | Wu-Tang Clan | The W (bonus disc) |
| 2000 | "Money Jane" | Baby Blue Soundcrew, Sean Paul, Jully Black | Private Party Collectors Edition |
| 2000 | "Ease Off" | Mastermind | Volume 49: The Set-Up |
| 2000 | "Lights Out" | Mastermind, Rah Digga | Volume 50: Street Legal |
| 2001 | "Doin' It" | Saukrates | The Longplay |
| 2001 | "Relate to Me" | YLook | —N/a |
| 2001 | "No Doubt" | Solitair | —N/a |
| 2001 | "The Commonwealth" | DLT, KD, Son Tan | Altruism |
| 2002 | "Still Too Much" | Ghetto Concept, Maestro, Snow, Red-1, Ironside | Ghetto Concept Presents...7 Bills All-Stars: Da Album |
| 2002 | "The Chosen Are Few" | Thrust | The Chosen Are Few |
| 2002 | "BaKardi Slang Refix" | Bounty Killer | Ghetto Dictionary: The Mystery |
| 2002 | "Grindin' (Selector Remix)" | Clipse, Sean Paul, Bless | Lord Willin' |
| 2002 | "Mach 4" | Choclair | Memoirs of Blake Savage |
| 2002 | "Fiyah!" | Rascalz, East Juvi | Reloaded |
| 2002 | "Hit Em Up" | Rascalz, Solitair, YLook | Reloaded |
| 2003 | "Block Reincarnated" | Shawnna | 2 Fast 2 Furious soundtrack |
| 2003 | "Carnival Girl" | Texas | Careful What You Wish For |
| 2003 | "Till Now" | Choclair, Jully Black, Saukrates, Tara Chase, Ro Dolla, YLook, Solitair | Flagrant |
| 2003 | "Fresh" | Choclair | My Demo |
| 2003 | "What I Need" | Prince Paul, Sly Boogy | Politics of the Business |
| 2003 | "Kartel & Kardinal" | Vybz Kartel | Up 2 Di Time |
| 2004 | "Cowboy Film" | Taz | Analyse This |
| 2004 | "Please Believe" | Chali 2na, Solitair | Fish Market |
| 2004 | "We Good" | Pete Rock | Soul Survivor II |
| 2004 | "Baby Come On" | Method Man | Tical 0: The Prequel |
| 2004 | "Block Reincarnated (Remix)" | Shawnna | Worth tha Weight |
| 2004 | "Sooner or Later" | Raghav | Storyteller |
| 2005 | "Warzone (NBA Live 2005 Mix)" | Pete Rock | NBA Live 2005 soundtrack |
| 2005 | "Ain't Got Nothing (Canadian Remix)" | David Banner, Solitair | Ain't Got Nothing (Global Grindin' Remixes) |
| 2005 | "Hater Bug" | Clinton Sparks | Maybe You Been Brainwashed |
| 2005 | "Toma (DJ Buddha Remix)" | Pitbull, Lil Jon, Mr. Vegas, Red Rat, T.O.K., Wayne Marshall | Money Is Still a Major Issue |
| 2005 | "Rush" | Rihanna | Music of the Sun |
| 2005 | "Deal wit It" | Afu-Ra, Jahdon | State of the Arts |
| 2005 | "Streets Is Alive" | Aasim | The Money Pit |
| 2005 | "Murderous" (bonus track) | Talib Kweli | Right About Now: The Official Sucka Free Mix CD |
| 2005 | "Belly Dancer (Bananza) (Remix)" | Akon | Trouble: Deluxe Edition |
| 2005 | "Kill the Dance (Got Something for Ya)" | Akon | Trouble: Deluxe Edition |
| 2005 | "Bang Bang" | Melanie Durrant | Where I'm Goin' |
| 2006 | "Smoke & Mirrors" | Exile | Dirty Science |
| 2006 | "True Stories (U.S. Remix)" | Sway, Styles P | This Is My Demo (iTunes version) |
| 2006 | "Trapped" | Promoe, Da'Ville | White Man's Burden |
| 2006 | "Rush the Club" | Jamie Kennedy, Stu Stone | Blowin' Up |
| 2006 | "Xotic Dancer" (originally from 2004) | Frank n Dank | Xtended Play Version 3.13 |
| 2006 | "Fire" | Lindo P | Riddim Driven: Higher Octane |
| 2006 | "Ghetto Youth" | K-Salaam, Beatnick, Solitair | The World Is Ours |
| 2007 | "Shottas" | T-Pain, Cham | Epiphany |
| 2007 | "Say Uh?" | BrassMunk | FEWturistic |
| 2007 | "Power Hustlers" | DJ Green Lantern, Nas | Here Comes Trouble |
| 2007 | "Rush" | Akon | Konvicted: Deluxe Edition |
| 2007 | "War" | Marco Polo | Port Authority |
| 2007 | "She Was So Flyy" | DJ Jazzy Jeff | The Return of the Magnificent |
| 2007 | "Colors (2007) (Reggae Remix)" | Sean Kingston, Vybz Kartel | Sean Kingston |
| 2007 | "The Last Hope" | Drake, Andreena Mill | Comeback Season |
| 2008 | "Tonight" | Baba Kahn, Sunny Brown, Lomaticc | Culture Shock Two |
| 2008 | "Cross That Line (Remix)" | Little Brother | ...And Justus for All |
| 2008 | "If You Ready" | Black Milk, Illa J, T3 | Caltroit |
| 2008 | "Everything" | Black Milk, Trek Life | Caltroit |
| 2008 | "2 Feet" | DJ Babu, Rakaa Iriscience | Duck Season Vol. 3 |
| 2008 | "As We Continue" | K-Salaam, Beatnick, Solitair | Whose World Is This? |
| 2008 | "Beautiful" | Akon, Colby O'Donis | Freedom |
| 2008 | "I.O.U.1." | Girlicious | Girlicious |
| 2008 | "Born and Raised in the Ghetto (Remix)" | Point Blank, Frankie Payne | Point Blank |
| 2008 | "Magnificent" | Estelle | Shine |
| 2008 | "Rock the Dancehall" | J Davey | The Beauty in Distortion/The Land of the Lost |
| 2008 | "Hurt U" (iTunes bonus track) | Jake One, Pharoahe Monch | White Van Music |
| 2008 | "No War" | Barrington Levy, Busta Rhymes | —N/a |
| 2009 | "Just Dance (RedOne Remix)" | Lady Gaga | Hitmixes |
| 2009 | "Bottle Pop (Digital Dog Extended)" | Pussycat Dolls, Snoop Dogg | Bottle Pop Remixes |
| 2009 | "Official Dope Boyz" | Greg Street, Lupe Fiasco, Wale | Sertified Worldwide |
| 2009 | "I Got Cha Opin '09" | Buckshot | Smirnoff Signature Mix Series |
| 2009 | "Contact!" | The Kid Daytona | Come Fly With Me |
| 2009 | "Milkshakes & Razorblades" | illScarlett | 1UP! |
| 2009 | "Belly Full (Bob Marley Tribute)" | J.Period, K'naan, Bajah, Steele | The Messengers |
| 2009 | "She's Out There" | Jully Black | The Black Book |
| 2009 | "Can't Hide the Truth" | Nottz, Cory Gunz | —N/a |
| 2010 | "Put Your Hands on Me" | Crookers, Carla-Marie | Tons of Friends |
| 2010 | "Freak" | Estelle | Step Up 3D soundtrack |
| 2010 | "So Much" | Raghav | The Phoenix |
| 2010 | "Money" | King Reign, Saukrates | Reign Music Vol. 2 |
| 2010 | "Red Dot Special (Rhatata)" | Spragga Benz, Shabba Ranks, Swizz Beatz | Shotta Culture |
| 2010 | "World on My Shoulders" | Rich Kidd, Saukrates, Richie Hennessey | We on Some Rich Kidd Shiiiit Volume 4: The Boiling Point |
| 2010 | "I Do It for Yawl" | Nottz, Little Brother | You Need This Music |
| 2010 | "Run It Back (Remix)" | Nottz, Asher Roth | Rawth EP |
| 2011 | "We Go Hard" | Mateo | Love & Stadiums |
| 2011 | "No Regrets" | Frankie Payne, Kim Davis | The New North |
| 2012 | "Ghetto Love" | Karl Wolf | Finally Free |
| 2012 | "Stylechanger" | Eric Turner, Wretch 32, Professor Green | Eric Turner: The Life |
| 2012 | "Swag (Remix)" | David Banner | Sex, Drugs & Video Games |
| 2013 | "Dearly Departed" | Maestro Fresh Wes | Orchestrated Noise |
| 2013 | "Depend on Me" | Young Noble, Deuce Deuce | Fast Life |
| 2013 | "Look Up (Signs)" | Classified, Madchild | Classified |
| 2013 | "Night Riders" | DMP | Nottz Presents DMP: God Made Durt! |
| 2013 | "Unplug" | ¡Mayday! | Believers |
| 2013 | "What They Say" | Marco Polo, Lil' Fame, Styles P | PA2: The Director's Cut |
| 2014 | "Monday Night" | SonReal | One Long Day |
| 2015 | "Disa My Ting" | T-Pain, Tosh | The Iron Way |
| 2015 | "Boyz II Men" | k-os, Saukrates, Shad, Choclair, King Reign | Can't Fly Without Gravity |

== Music videos ==
| Year | Title | Director(s) |
|---|---|---|
| 1997 | "On wit da Show" | Marcus Valentin |
| 1998 | "Jeevin' (Life)" | David Cropper |
| 2000 | "Husslin'" | Kevin De Freitas |
| 2001 | "BaKardi Slang" | Kevin De Freitas |
| 2001 | "Ol' Time Killin'" | Little X |
| 2001 | "Powerfulll" | —N/a |
| 2003 | "Belly Dancer" (unreleased) | Little X |
| 2005 | "Heads Up" | Richard Yagutilov |
| 2005 | "Everyday (Rudebwoy)" | RT! |
| 2006 | "Feel Alright" | RT! |
| 2006 | "Last Standing Soldier (Bedouin Remix)" | RT! |
| 2007 | "Graveyard Shift" | Fafu |
| 2008 | "Dangerous" | Gil Green |
| 2008 | "Burnt" | Richard Yagutilov |
| 2008 | "Set It Off" | Matt Alonzo |
| 2008 | "Numba 1 (Tide Is High)" | Gil Green |
| 2008 | "Nina" | Gil Green |
| 2009 | "Clear!" | Bobby O'Neill |
| 2010 | "We Gon' Go" | Chris G. |
| 2011 | "The Anthem" | Kardinal Offishall, Mayday |
| 2011 | "Anywhere (Ol' Time Killin' Part 2)" | Rome |
| 2012 | "Kill Shot" | John P. Wheatley, Benny-Demus |
| 2012 | "Mr. Parker" | Chris Strikes |
| 2012 | "Turn It Up" | —N/a |
| 2014 | "I'm a Star" | Die Fire Films |
| 2014 | "That Chick Right There" | Ty Black & Jaiden |
| 2015 | "Baby It's U!" | Cazhmere |

== See also ==
- Kardinal Offishall production discography
