= Kardinal Offishall production discography =

The following is a discography of production by Kardinal Offishall.

== Production discography ==
| Year | Song | Artist | Album |
|---|---|---|---|
| 1996 | "Naughty Dread" | Kardinal Offishall | Rap Essentials Volume One |
| 1996 | "Naughty Dread (Remix)" | Kardinal Offishall | Naughty Dread (VLS) |
| 1996 | "Wordz Of..." | Marvel | Kalifornia (VLS) |
| 1997 | "Breakdown (Keep Moving)" | Kardinal Offishall featuring Denosh | Eye & I |
| 1997 | "On wit da Show" | Kardinal Offishall | Eye & I |
| 1997 | "Da Brown" | Kardinal Offishall | Eye & I |
| 1997 | "Mysteries" | Kardinal Offishall | Eye & I |
| 1997 | "P.W.O.T." | Kardinal Offishall featuring Afrolistics | Eye & I |
| 1997 | "My Niah" | Kardinal Offishall featuring L.J. | Eye & I |
| 1997 | "Madmoizellez" | Kardinal Offishall featuring Wade O. Brown | Eye & I |
| 1997 | "Make It Happen" | Kardinal Offishall featuring Red-1 | Eye & I |
| 1997 | "W.I. Philosophi" | Kardinal Offishall featuring Miss Raelene | Eye & I |
| 1997 | "Bellee Buss (Don't Make Me Laugh)" | Kardinal Offishall | Eye & I |
| 1997 | "LoLo" | Kardinal Offishall | Eye & I |
| 1997 | "King of da Hill" | Kardinal Offishall featuring Tara Chase | Eye & I |
| 1997 | "Elle A" | Kardinal Offishall | Eye & I |
| 1997 | "Naughty Dread Pt. II" | Kardinal Offishall | Eye & I |
| 1997 | "Friday Night" | Kardinal Offishall | Eye & I |
| 1999 | "Put 'Em Up" | Kardinal Offishall featuring Tara Chase and YLook | And What? (VLS) |
| 1999 | "Flagrant (Remix)" | Choclair | Flagrant (VLS) / The Longplay |
| 1999 | "Freestyle" | Eddie Ill & D.L. featuring Kardinal Offishall, Choclair, and YLook | The Time Has Come |
| 1999 | "Let's Ride" | Choclair | Ice Cold |
| 1999 | "Bare Witness" | Choclair featuring Guru | Ice Cold |
| 1999 | "Jambone" | Choclair | Ice Cold |
| 1999 | "Runnin' wid Us" | Choclair | Ice Cold |
| 2000 | "Husslin'" | Kardinal Offishall | Husslin' |
| 2000 | "Mic T.H.U.G.S." | Kardinal Offishall | Husslin' |
| 2000 | "Bustin' Loose (Original Mix)" | Maestro | Ever Since |
| 2000 | "Lights Out" | Mastermind featuring Kardinal Offishall and Rah Digga | Volume 50: Street Legal |
| 2000 | "Money Jane" | Baby Blue Soundcrew featuring Kardinal Offishall, Jully Black, and Sean Paul | Private Party Collectors Edition |
| 2001 | "Money Jane (Remix)" | Kardinal Offishall featuring Jully Black and Sean Paul | Quest for Fire: Firestarter, Vol. 1 |
| 2001 | "Man by Choice" | Kardinal Offishall | Quest for Fire: Firestarter, Vol. 1 |
| 2001 | "U R Ghetto 2002" | Kardinal Offishall | Quest for Fire: Firestarter, Vol. 1 |
| 2001 | "Quest for Fire" | Kardinal Offishall featuring Solitair | Quest for Fire: Firestarter, Vol. 1 |
| 2001 | "Powerfulll" | Kardinal Offishall featuring Jully Black and Tara Chase | Quest for Fire: Firestarter, Vol. 1 |
| 2001 | "G Walkin'" | Kardinal Offishall featuring Glenn Lewis | Quest for Fire: Firestarter, Vol. 1 |
| 2001 | "Go Ahead Den" | Kardinal Offishall | Quest for Fire: Firestarter, Vol. 1 |
| 2002 | "The Chosen Are Few" | Thrust featuring Kardinal Offishall | The Chosen Are Few |
| 2002 | "Relationships" | Thrust | The Chosen Are Few |
| 2002 | "When I'm High" | Choclair featuring Bishop Brigante | Memoirs of Blake Savage |
| 2003 | "Carnival Girl (Kardinal Offishall Remix)" | Texas featuring Kardinal Offishall | Carnival Girl (CDS) |
| 2003 | "Glistenin'" | Choclair | Flagrant |
| 2004 | "Bang Bang" | Kardinal Offishall | Kill Bloodclott Bill |
| 2004 | "Phoners" | Kardinal Offishall | Kill Bloodclott Bill |
| 2004 | "Tear de Wallz Down" | Kardinal Offishall | Kill Bloodclott Bill |
| 2004 | "Black Jays Freestyle" (third version) | Kardinal Offishall | Kill Bloodclott Bill |
| 2004 | "Me & Frank the Tank" | Kardinal Offishall | Kill Bloodclott Bill |
| 2004 | "See the Fire" | Kardinal Offishall | Kill Bloodclott Bill |
| 2004 | "Bonus Material..." | Kardinal Offishall | Kill Bloodclott Bill |
| 2005 | "Bang Bang" | Melanie Durrant featuring Kardinal Offishall | Where I'm Goin' |
| 2005 | "Last Standing Soldier" | Kardinal Offishall | Fire and Glory |
| 2005 | "Heads Up" | Kardinal Offishall | Fire and Glory |
| 2005 | "Everyday (Rudebwoy)" | Kardinal Offishall featuring Ray Robinson | Fire and Glory |
| 2005 | "The Best Man" | Kardinal Offishall featuring Spragga Benz and Darryl Riley | Fire and Glory |
| 2005 | "Freshie" | Kardinal Offishall featuring Ro Dolla | Fire and Glory |
| 2005 | "Sunday" | Kardinal Offishall | Fire and Glory |
| 2005 | "Neva New (Till I Kissed You)" | Kardinal Offishall | Fire and Glory |
| 2005 | "Mr. Officer" | Kardinal Offishall featuring Renee Neufville | Fire and Glory |
| 2005 | "Watchalike" | Kardinal Offishall featuring Busta Rhymes | Fire and Glory |
| 2005 | "Feel Alright" | Kardinal Offishall | Fire and Glory |
| 2005 | "All the Way" | Kardinal Offishall | Fire and Glory |
| 2006 | "Rush the Club" | Jamie Kennedy and Stu Stone featuring Kardinal Offishall | Blowin' Up |
| 2006 | "Chox Ya'll" | Choclair | Flagship |
| 2006 | "Xotic Dancer" (originally from 2004) | Frank n Dank featuring Kardinal Offishall | Xtended Play Version 3.13 |
| 2007 | "Say Uh?" | BrassMunk featuring Kardinal Offishall | FEWturistic |
| 2007 | "No Streets" | Marvel | No Streets (Just the World) |
| 2007 | "Rush" | Akon featuring Kardinal Offishall | Konvicted: Deluxe Edition |
| 2008 | "If You Ready" | Black Milk featuring Kardinal Offishall, Illa J, and T3 | Caltroit |
| 2008 | "Bad Like We Bad" | Kardinal Offishall | Not 4 Sale |
| 2008 | "Go Home with You" | Kardinal Offishall featuring T-Pain | Not 4 Sale |
| 2008 | "Family Tree (Still Eyerize)" | Kardinal Offishall featuring Glenn Lewis | Not 4 Sale |
| 2009 | "Star" | Estelle | Star (single) |
| 2009 | "Clear!" | Kardinal Offishall | Clear! (single) |
| 2010 | "The Anthem" | Kardinal Offishall | The Anthem (single) |
| 2011 | "Anywhere (Ol' Time Killin' Part 2)" | Kardinal Offishall | Anywhere (Ol' Time Killin' Part 2) (single) |
