= Kill Bill (disambiguation) =

Kill Bill: Volume 1 is a 2003 film by Quentin Tarantino.

Kill Bill may also refer to:

== Film ==
- Kill Bill: Volume 2, a 2004 film by Quentin Tarantino
- Kill Bill: The Whole Bloody Affair, a 2004 film that combines Volume 1 and Volume 2

== Songs ==
- "Kill Bill" (song), a song by SZA from SOS (2022)
- "Kill Bill" (Brown Eyed Girls song), from the album Black Box (2013)
- "Kill Bill", a song by Tedua from the deluxe edition of La Divina Commedia (2024)

== See also ==
- Kill Bloodclott Bill, a 2004 mixtape by Kardinal Offishall
- "Kill the Bill", slogan used in protests against the Police, Crime, Sentencing and Courts Act 2022
