= Ghetto Love =

Ghetto Love may refer to:

- Ghetto Love (Jaheim album), 2001, or the title song
- Ghetto Love (Melvin Riley album), 1994
- Ghetto Love (EP), a 2008 EP by Spinnerette, or its title song
- "Ghetto Love" (Da Brat song)
- "Ghetto Love" (Karl Wolf song), 2011
- "Ghetto Love", a song by Macy Gray from Big
- "Ghetto Love", a song by Mario from Go!
- "Ghetto Love", a song by Master P from MP da Last Don
- "Ghetto Love", a song by Swizz Beats featuring Mashonda and LL Cool J from Swizz Beatz Presents G.H.E.T.T.O. Stories
- "Ghetto Love", a song by Tech N9ne from Sickology 101
