= Mr. Attic =

- Born: Roger Perryman
- Origin: Toronto, Ontario, Canada
- Occupation: Record producer
- Years active: 1989–present
- Label: Choice Cut Records

Roger Perryman, better known as Mr. Attic, is a Canadian hip-hop producer from Toronto, Ontario. He is a member of Juno Award-winning production team, Da Grassroots.

== Career ==
Mr. Attic began his career in 1989, as a member of Da Grassroots. Throughout the 1990s, the group produced for many underground artists in Toronto's hip hop scene, most notably Ghetto Concept. The group released their debut album Passage Through Time in 1999. After the underground success of their album, each member began working on various solo projects. Mr. Attic co-founded Choice Cut Records in 2000. When producing music, he uses an Ensoniq EPS-16+ sampler.

== Production discography ==
(Not including songs credited to Da Grassroots.)

1999

- "Can't Touch Us" – Saukrates (co-produced)
- "Body Language" – Saukrates feat. Choclair
- "Confusions" – Red Life feat. Akshun

2000

- "These Days & Times" – Checkmate feat. Concise
- "Rise Up" – BrassMunk
- "Groupie Central" – Mr. Roam
- "It Ain't Nuttin'" – Mastermind feat. BrassMunk and Saukrates
- "Let's Make a Record Deal Episode 2" – Mastermind feat. Monolith

2001

- "Ol' Time Killin'" – Kardinal Offishall feat. Jully Black, Allistair, IRS, and Wio-K

2002

- "Big" – BrassMunk
- "This 'n That" – Thrust feat. Choclair
- "One Flow" – Thrust

2003

- "Major League" – IRS
- "System" – Mr. Roam
- "Psyko-Nitro Pt. II" – Mr. Roam (co-produced)
- "It's So Hard" – The Game feat. 50 Cent and Lloyd Banks

2005

- "E.G.G. (Everybody Gone Gangsta)" – Kardinal Offishall feat. Vybz Kartel
- "Salute" – Chocolate Thai

2006

- "Soul Jah" – Boot Camp Clik
- "Rear View Mirror" – Termanology

2007

- "Letter 2 John (Interlude)", "Letter 2 John" – Mathematik
- "IT", "Hold On" – Marvel

2008

- "Get It Goin'" – Torae

2010

- "Childish Games" – Consequence feat. Asher Roth
- "Add Rhyme & Mix (A.R.M.) Pt. 1" – Mr. Attic feat. Marvel and Mr. Roam

2012

- "Breathe" – UnLearn
