= Allow Me to Reintroduce Myself =

Allow Me to Reintroduce Myself may refer to:

- "Allow Me to Reintroduce Myself" (Scandal), TV episode
- Allow Me to Reintroduce Myself (EP), by Zara Larsson
- A.M.T.R.I.M., or Allow Me to Re-Introduce Myself, mixtape by Kardinal Offishall and Nottz

== See also ==
- "Let Me Reintroduce Myself", 2020 single by Gwen Stefani
- "Allow me to reintroduce myself", the opening line of Jay-Z's 2003 song "Public Service Announcement"
