= Passage Through Time =

Studio album by Da Grassroots
- Released: November 9, 1999
- Recorded: 1995–1999
- Genre: Canadian hip hop
- Label: Conception Records
- Producer: Mr. Attic, Mr. Murray, Swiff (Da Grassroots)

Singles from Passage Through Time
- 1. "Price of Livin'" Released: 1999; 2. "Thematics" Released: 1999; 3. "Body Language" Released: 2000

Passage Through Time is the debut album of Canadian hip hop production team Da Grassroots, released November 9, 1999 in the United States. It was released independently on Conception Records. The album features MCs from Toronto's underground hip hop scene. "Price of Livin'", "Thematics", and "Body Language" are singles from the album.

== Reception ==
Professional ratings
Review scores
Source	Rating
AllMusic	4/5 stars

The album received high critical acclaim. Amazon.com gave the album a favorable review, calling the group "Masters of understated musical eloquence," also stating "This is what good music sounds like." Allmusic gave it 4 out of 5 stars, stating "All in all, this album is a great example of the talent north of the border that has often been overlooked by the mass media channels."

== Track listing ==
#	Title	Producer(s)	Featured guest(s)
1.	"Intro"	Mr. Attic	
2.	"Spears of Ice"	Swiff	Q-Bot
3.	"Thematics"	Mr. Attic	Arcee
4.	"Eternal"	Mr. Murray	K-os, Thrust
5.	"Precious Metals"	Mr. Attic	Ghetto Concept
6.	"Kenny's Query"	Mr. Murray	
7.	"Last Days"	Mr. Attic	Marvel, G-Knight
8.	"Price of Livin'"	Mr. Attic	Mr. Roam
9.	"Pylar Sanchez"	Swiff	Remy Rezzin'
10.	"Intermission"		
11.	"Infomercial"	Mr. Attic	
12.	"Postal Work"	Mr. Attic	Mr. Roam
13.	"Body Language"	Mr. Attic	Choclair, Saukrates
14.	"The Approach"	Mr. Attic	
15.	"Black Dove"	Mr. Attic	Schizm
16.	"Kenny's Theme"		
17.	"Melancholy Blue"†		
18.	"Political Proverbs"	Swiff	Cryp2nite, Q-Bot
19.	"A Mother's Love"	Mr. Attic	
20.	"Born II Roam"	Mr. Murray	Mr. Roam
21.	"Revival (Three Rhyme Superstars)"	Mr. Attic	Arcee, Fatski, Schizm
22.	"Outro"†		
23.*	"Drama" (bonus track)	Mr. Attic	Elemental
24.*	"Living Underwater" (bonus track)	Mr. Attic	Elemental

† These songs do not appear on the album and are not credited in the liner notes.

== Samples ==
- "Thematics" – Contains a sample of "Stakes Is High" by De La Soul
- "Precious Metals" – Contains a sample of "Pastures" by Ahmad Jamal
- "Price of Livin'" – Contains a sample of "You Know the Deal" by Bennie Maupin
- "Black Dove" – Contains a sample of "The Frustrated Nigga" by Jeru the Damaja
