= Dangerous (Kardinal Offishall song) =

Single by Kardinal Offishall featuring Akon

from the album Not 4 Sale
- Released: March 18, 2008
- Recorded: 2007
- Genre: Hip-hop; R&B
- Length: 4:11 (album version); 3:52 (radio edit)
- Label: Kon Live; Geffen; Black Jays
- Songwriters: Jason Harrow; Aliaune Thiam
- Producers: DJ Kemo; Häzel

Kardinal Offishall singles chronology
"Graveyard Shift" (2007)	"Dangerous" (2008)	"Burnt" (2008)

Akon singles chronology
"I Can't Wait" (2008)	"Dangerous" (2008)	"Frozen" (2008)

Music video
- "Dangerous" on YouTube

"Dangerous" is a song by Canadian rapper Kardinal Offishall featuring Senegalese-American singer Akon. Produced by DJ Kemo and Häzel, it was the first single from his fourth album, Not 4 Sale. It was released to radio on March 18, 2008, and on iTunes on April 1. On the week of May 13, at the American iTunes Store, the song was offered as a free download (Single of the Week). The song won the award for Single of the Year at the 2009 Juno Awards. In January 2023, the single was certified 4× Platinum by Music Canada and 3× Platinum by the RIAA.

== Music video ==
The music video was shot in Miami, Florida and directed by Gil Green. It debuted in early May on AOL.com. It starts off with a girl (Chanta Patton) passing by Kardinal, Akon, and friends as all of them watch her and follow her. Most of the scenes start by zooming out of objects such as sunglasses, a drinking cup, etc. It has scenes in a restaurant, a club, and a beach. There are cameo appearances in the video by DJ Khaled, Red Cafe, Black Chiney, Clinton Sparks, and more.

== Formats and track listings ==
=== CD single ===
1. "Dangerous" (Main Version)
2. "Dangerous" (Remix) (featuring Akon and Sean Paul)

=== 12" single ===
A-side

1. "Dangerous" (Clean)
2. "Dangerous" (Remix) (featuring Akon and Sean Paul)

B-side

1. "Dangerous" (Explicit)
2. "Dangerous" (Instrumental)

== Remixes ==
There are three official remixes for "Dangerous". The first is a soca remix which uses a different beat, and retains the original lyrics. The second remix features Akon and Sean Paul, using the original beat, with new lyrics by Kardinal and Sean Paul. The third remix uses a different beat, and features Akon, Sean Paul, and Twista.

== Chart performance ==
After being released by the Canadian iTunes Store, the song quickly raced to the top 10 on the Top 100 songs list, peaking at number three. As a result of this, it debuted on the Canadian Hot 100 the following week at number nine, and in early July, the song peaked at number two. On the issue date of May 17, the song debuted on the US Billboard Bubbling Under Hot 100 Singles chart, making it Kardinal's third single to make an appearance on a U.S. Billboard chart, and his first since "Belly Dancer" in 2003. The following week, the single debuted at number 91 on the Billboard Hot 100, and later peaked at number five, making him the first Canadian rapper to have a song chart on the Hot 100. In early October 2008, the single was released in the UK on iTunes. The single achieved moderate success there, peaking at number 16 on the UK Singles Chart.

== Charts ==
=== Weekly charts ===
Chart (2008)	Peak position
Australia (ARIA)	42
Austria (Ö3 Austria Top 40)	41
Belgium (Ultratop 50 Flanders)	27
Belgium (Ultratop 50 Wallonia)	34
Canada Hot 100 (Billboard)	2
Czech Republic Airplay (ČNS IFPI)	5
Denmark (Tracklisten)	31
Finland (Suomen virallinen lista)	10
France (SNEP)	8
Germany (GfK)	18
Hungary (Rádiós Top 40)	18
Norway (VG-lista)	5
Poland (Nielsen Music Control)	2
Romania (Romanian Top 100)	4
Sweden (Sverigetopplistan)	45
Switzerland (Schweizer Hitparade)	44
UK Singles (Official Charts)	16
US Billboard Hot 100	5
US Hot R&B/Hip-Hop Songs (Billboard)	50
US Hot Rap Songs (Billboard)	6
US Pop Airplay (Billboard)	3
US Rhythmic Airplay (Billboard)	1

=== Year-end charts ===
Chart (2008)	Position
Brazil (Crowley)	83
Canada (Canadian Hot 100)	11
Canada CHR/Top 40 (Billboard)	1
UK Singles (Official Charts Company)	101
US Billboard Hot 100	29
US Mainstream Top 40 (Billboard)	24
US Rhythmic (Billboard)	6

Chart (2009)	Position
Hungary (Rádiós Top 40)	51

== Certifications ==
Region	Certification	Certified units/sales
Brazil (Pro-Música Brasil)	2× Platinum	120,000^{‡}
Canada (Music Canada)	4× Platinum	320,000^{‡}
Denmark (IFPI Danmark)	Platinum	90,000^{‡}
Germany (BVMI)	Gold	150,000^{‡}
New Zealand (RMNZ)	2× Platinum	60,000^{‡}
United Kingdom (BPI)	Platinum	600,000^{‡}
United States (RIAA)	3× Platinum	3,000,000^{‡}
^{‡} Sales+streaming figures based on certification alone.

== Other appearances ==
"Dangerous" was featured in a dance routine performed by A.S.I.I.D., in an episode of America's Best Dance Crew. The song was also featured on So You Think You Can Dance Canada, during a hip-hop dance performance by Dario Milard and Romina D'Ugo. The "Dangerous" remix, featuring Akon and Sean Paul, is featured in the 2009 video game expansion pack, Grand Theft Auto IV: The Lost and Damned on the radio station The Beat 102.7.
