= Hustling (disambiguation) =

Hustling is the deceptive act of disguising one's skill in a sport or game as a form of both a confidence trick and match fixing.

Hustling may also refer to:

- Hustling (prostitution)
- Hustling (film), a 1975 film
- "Hustling" (Band of Gold), a 1996 television episode
- Hustlin' (album), a 1964 album by Stanley Turrentine
- "Hustlin'", a 2006 single by Rick Ross
- Husslin', a 2000 EP by Kardinal Offishall
