= I & I =

I & I may refer to:

- An expression in Iyaric, a dialect of English
- Eye & I, a 1997 album by Kardinal Offishall
