= Ice Cold =

Studio album by Choclair
- Released: November 2, 1999 (Canada); March 14, 2000 (United States)
- Recorded: 1998–1999
- Genre: Canadian hip hop
- Length: 72:31
- Label: Virgin; Priority
- Producer: Kardinal Offishall; Solitair; Saukrates; K-Cut; X-Rated; Da Grassroots; Frankenstein; Day

Choclair chronology
What It Takes (1997)	Ice Cold (1999)	Memoirs of Blake Savage (2002)

Singles from Ice Cold
- 1. "Let's Ride" Released: 1999; 2. "Rubbin'" Released: 2000

Ice Cold is the debut studio album of Canadian rapper Choclair, released November 2, 1999 in Canada and March 14, 2000 in the United States. It was released on major label Virgin/Priority Records. The album's early success was driven by the first single, "Let's Ride", which reached #37 on the Billboard Hot Rap Singles chart and #38 on the Canadian RPM Singles Chart. The second single, "Rubbin'", features Saukrates.

== Reception ==
Professional ratings
Review scores
Source	Rating
AllMusic	4/5 stars
Alternative Press	3/5 stars
RapReviews	8/10
The Source	3/5 stars

In Canada, the album debuted at #10 on the Canadian Albums Chart and went gold in 35 days, eventually selling over 63,000 copies. It received generally favorable reviews from music critics. AllMusic gave the album 4 out of 5 stars, noting that Choclair used it "not only to display his own lyrical credentials, but to showcase the wealth of untapped talent our neighbors to the north have to offer." The Source gave it 3 out of 5 mics, praising the production, "the beats...give this album some of the most original sounds in hip-hop today." The album won the award for Best Rap Recording at the 2000 Juno Awards.

== Track listing ==
#	Title	Producer(s)	Featured guest(s)	Length
1.	"Intro"			0:21
2.	"Ice Cold"	Da Grassroots		4:37
3.	"Let's Ride"	Kardinal Offishall		4:21
4.	"Rubbin'"	Saukrates	Saukrates	3:43
5.	"Takin' It In"	Saukrates		5:10
6.	"Bare Witness"	Kardinal Offishall	Guru	3:53
7.	"Jambone"	Kardinal Offishall		4:30
8.	"Fresh"	Solitair		4:50
9.	"Kardi's P.S.A."			0:40
10.	"Rollin'"	K-Cut (co-produced by X-Rated)	Jully Black	5:30
11.	"Young Gunz"	Solitair	Memphis Bleek	4:09
12.	"Runnin' wid Us"	Kardinal Offishall		3:40
13.	"Flagrant"	Saukrates		3:49
14.	"Die Hard"	Solitair	Rascalz	4:54
15.	"S.O.T."	Solitair	Solitair and Kardinal Offishall	4:39
16.	"Da Chiznock"	K-Cut (co-produced by X-Rated)		4:43
17.	"First Thing"	Day and Solitair	Rahzel	4:27
18.	"Situation 9"	Frankenstein		4:35

The 1999 Canadian release does not include "First Thing". Instead, there is a radio version of "Rollin'".

== Samples ==
- "Bare Witness" – Contains a sample of "DWYCK" by Gang Starr

== Chart positions ==
Chart (1999)	Peak position
Canadian Albums Chart	10
Canadian RPM Albums Chart	8

== Release history ==
Region	Date
Canada	November 2, 1999
United States	March 14, 2000
