= Firestarter Vol. 2: Everyday, Sometimes… =

Studio album by Kardinal Offishall
- Released: September 25, 2026
- Recorded: 2025–2026
- Genre: Canadian hip hop
- Length: 35:59
- Label: Self-released

Kardinal Offishall chronology
Kardi Gras, Vol. 1: The Clash (2015)	Firestarter Vol. 2: Everyday, Sometimes… (2026)

Singles from Firestarter Vol. 2: Everyday, Sometimes…
- 1. "Where There's Smoke" Released: 2026; 2. "My Brother's Keeper Part 2" Released: 2026; 3. "Kiss Me When I" Released: 2026

Firestarter Vol. 2: Everyday, Sometimes… is the sixth studio album by Canadian rapper Kardinal Offishall. It serves as the sequel to his 2001 album Quest for Fire: Firestarter, Vol. 1, celebrating its 25th anniversary.

== Track listing ==
#	Title	Featured guest(s)	Length
1.	"Heavy Is the Head"		3:59
2.	"40 Acres And a Ferrari"	Black Thought, Stove God Cooks	3:41
3.	"All Nighter"	T-Pain, Konshens	4:27
4.	"Kiss Me When I"	Glenn Lewis	3:46
5.	"Top 3"	Buju Banton, Idris Elba	3:47
6.	"My Brother's Keeper (Part 2)"	NESTA	2:47
7.	"When You're In Love"	Melanie Fiona	3:45
8.	"Bombay Sunsets"	Idris Elba	3:33
9.	"When There's Smoke"		3:10
10.	"Everyday, Sometimes..."	BJ the Chicago Kid	3:39
