= Frankenstein (rapper) =

- Birth name: Frank Fallico
- Origin: Greater Toronto Area, Ontario
- Genres: Rap music
- Occupation(s): Rapper and record producer
- Labels: Knowledge of Self

Frankenstein is the stage name of Frank Fallico, a former Canadian rapper and record producer. He is most noted as a two-time Juno Award nominee for Rap Recording of the Year, receiving nods at the Juno Awards of 1998 for his single "The Rain Is Gone" and at the Juno Awards of 1999 for his album Frankenstein UV.

Forming his own independent Knowledge of Self label in the mid-1990s, he released a number of singles, including "Frankenstein's Pain", "What Does It All Mean" and "The Rain Is Gone", before releasing UV in 1997.

Fallico also produced material for other artists, including "Situation 9" on Choclair's album Ice Cold, "When I Rhyme" on Maestro Fresh Wes's album Ever Since, and a remix of Lord Tariq and Peter Gunz's "Deja Vu (Uptown Baby)". Under the stage name Frankie Ano, he also collaborated with Bahamadia on the song "Droppin' Gems" for the Drop the Beat television soundtrack.

With Day, Choclair's business partner in Knee Deep Entertainment, he was also co-host of an internet radio show devoted to Canadian hip hop.

He has since left the music business, and is currently a real estate agent in the Greater Toronto Area.

Much of his recorded material was reissued by Ill Adrenaline Records in 2014 as the compilation album The Science of Sound.
