= Fire and Glory =

Studio album by Kardinal Offishall
- Released: November 15, 2005
- Recorded: 2002–2005
- Genre: Canadian hip hop
- Length: 62:18
- Label: EMI; Virgin; Black Jays
- Producer: Kardinal Offishall; Ro Dolla; Jake One; Exile; Mr. Attic

Kardinal Offishall chronology
Quest for Fire: Firestarter, Vol. 1 (2001)	Fire and Glory (2005)	Not 4 Sale (2008)

Singles from Fire and Glory
- 1. "Heads Up" Released: October 2005; 2. "Everyday (Rudebwoy)" Released: October 2005; 3. "Feel Alright" Released: March 2006

Fire and Glory is the third studio album by Canadian rapper Kardinal Offishall, released November 15, 2005 through EMI and Virgin Records, exclusively in Canada. Two hit singles were released from the album, "Everyday (Rudebwoy)" and "Feel Alright".

== Background ==
In 2003, Kardinal released "Belly Dancer", featuring Pharrell Williams, which was originally the lead single from his album Firestarter Vol. 2: The F-Word Theory. The album was scheduled for a summer 2003 release on MCA Records, and was supposed to be his big-budget commercial breakthrough. However, the album was delayed numerous times, and MCA was absorbed by Geffen Records in May. Kardinal lost his chance to release the album, and it was shelved.

Fire and Glory, the follow-up to Quest for Fire: Firestarter, Vol. 1, featured collaborations with popular artists, such as Busta Rhymes, Vybz Kartel and Estelle. Three songs from the album — "Whatchalike", "All the Way" and "Mr. Officer" — were supposed to appear on the Firestarter Vol. 2 album. The album produced three singles and music videos in Canada: "Heads Up", "Feel Alright" and "Everyday (Rudebwoy)", the latter receiving heavy rotation on MuchMusic. In June 2006, Kardinal won three MuchMusic Video Awards for "Everyday (Rudebwoy)". A remix of the song "Last Standing Soldier" was released as a single in 2006, featuring Bedouin Soundclash.

Kardinal explained why he chose Fire and Glory as the name of the album:

You have to walk through the fire, to get to the glory. Having your ex-label dissolve, and then trying to get a priority release on Geffen/Interscope with Jadakiss and Eminem in the picture means my eyes are wide open now.

== Reception ==
Professional ratings
Review scores
Source	Rating
RapReviews	8.5/10

RapReviews.com gave the album an 8.5/10 rating, stating "Fire and Glory is a better album than Firestarter Vol. 1," and "aside from having better lyrics than most of his counterparts, Kardinal's unique style also sets him apart." The album was nominated for Rap Recording of the Year at the 2006 Juno Awards.

== Track listing ==
#	Title	Producer(s)	Featured guest(s)	Length
1.	"Last Standing Soldier"	Kardinal Offishall		4:46
2.	"E.G.G. (Everybody Gone Gangsta)"	Mr. Attic	Vybz Kartel	4:17
3.	"Heads Up"	Kardinal Offishall		3:16
4.	"Everyday (Rudebwoy)"	Kardinal Offishall	Ray Robinson	5:06
5.	"The Best Man"	Kardinal Offishall	Spragga Benz and Darryl Riley	4:01
6.	"Freshie"	Kardinal Offishall	Ro Dolla	4:38
7.	"Sunday"	Kardinal Offishall		4:35
8.	"Kaysarasara"	Jake One	Estelle	5:05
9.	"Neva New (Till I Kissed You)"	Kardinal Offishall		4:10
10.	"Mr. Officer"	Ro Dolla (co-produced by Kardinal Offishall)	Renee Neufville	3:59
11.	"Watchalike"	Kardinal Offishall	Busta Rhymes	3:25
12.	"Fire and Glory"	Exile	Nicole Moses	4:25
13.	"Feel Alright"	Kardinal Offishall		3:57
14.	"All the Way"	Kardinal Offishall		6:30

== Samples ==
- "Everyday (Rudebwoy)" – Contains a sample of "People Everyday" (metamorphosis mix) by Arrested Development
- "Neva New (Till I Kissed You)" – Contains a sample of "Till I Kiss You" by Nana McLean
- "Mr. Officer" – Contains a sample of "Chant a Psalm" by Steel Pulse

== Personnel ==
- Allistair – vocals
- Jully Black – vocals
- Craig Boyko – photography
- Busta Rhymes – lyricist, guest appearance
- Theodore Daley – cover art concept
- Exile – producer, instrumentation
- Kardinal Offishall – piano, vocals, producer, liner notes, executive producer, shaker, A&R, instrumentation
- Anne Keenan – photography
- Russ Klyne – guitar
- Mayday – executive producer, A&R
- Mr. Attic – producer, instrumentation
- Antoine Moonen – package design
- Memmalatel "Mr. Mojo" Morgan – executive producer, A&R
- Nicole Moses – vocals, lyricist
- Renee Neufville – vocals, lyricist
- Darryl Riley – vocals
- Ivana Santilli – horn
- Silver (Solitair) – executive producer, A&R
