= Eye & I =

Studio album by Kardinal Offishall
- Released: December 9, 1997
- Recorded: 1996–1997
- Genre: Canadian hip hop
- Length: 69:18
- Label: Capitol Hill Music
- Producer: Kardinal Offishall; Saukrates

Kardinal Offishall chronology
Eye & I (1997)	Husslin' (2000)

Singles from Eye & I
- 1. "On wit da Show" Released: 1997

Eye & I is the debut album of Canadian rapper Kardinal Offishall, released independently in December 1997, on Capitol Hill Music, and distributed by St. Clair Entertainment. The album was critically acclaimed. One single, "On wit da Show", was released from the album.

== Background ==
In 1996, after releasing his first single "Naughty Dread", Kardinal signed a publishing deal with Warner/Chappell Music Canada. About 40 percent of the album's cost was provided by the publishing deal. The only single released from the album was "On wit da Show", which was accompanied by a music video. The single also appeared on Kardinal's second studio album, Quest for Fire: Firestarter, Vol. 1. In 1998, a music video of the song "Jeevin' (Life)" was also released.

Members of The Circle appear on the album, including Solitair, Saukrates and Jully Black. Ro Dolla appears on the album as Afrolistics; Lock Jaw appears as L.J.

== Reception ==
The album received rave reviews from music critics. AllMusic stated that Kardinal "blended soul, dancehall, reggae, hip-hop, and a wholly inventive approach to beats on his 20-track debut album, Eye & I." However, the album was poorly distributed in Canada, and a lack of radio support resulted in the album receiving limited commercial attention. Over 4,000 copies of the album were sold in its first three months of release.

== Track listing ==
All songs produced by Kardinal Offishall, except "Sweet Marie" and "Jeevin (Life)", produced by Saukrates. "Breakdown (Keep Moving)" is co-produced by Saukrates.

#	Title	Featured guest(s)	Length
1.	"Breakdown (Keep Moving)"	Denosh	4:42
2.	"On wid da Show"		4:06
3.	"Da Brown"		4:13
4.	"Hint-a-lude"		0:43
5.	"Mysteries"		4:34
6.	"P.W.O.T."	Afrolistics	4:03
7.	"My Niah"	L.J.	4:14
8.	"Madmoizellez"	Wade O. Brown	4:52
9.	"Hint-a-lude"		0:10
10.	"Make It Happen"	Red-1	4:53
11.	"W.I. Philosophi"	Miss Raelene	1:26
12.	"Sweet Marie"	Nicole Sinclair	4:02
13.	"Bellee Buss (Don't Make Me Laugh)"		3:24
14.	"LoLo"		1:56
15.	"King of da Hill"	Tara Chase	4:32
16.	"Elle A"		3:57
17.	"Jeevin' (Life)"	Jully Black	5:16
18.	"Naughty Dread Pt. II"		4:40
19.	"Hint-a-lude"		0:30
20.	"Friday Night"		3:18

== Samples ==
- "Bellee Buss (Don't Make Me Laugh)" contains samples of "Paid in Full (Coldcut Remix)" by Eric B. & Rakim and "Brainstorm" by Gang Starr
