= Feel Alright =

Single by Kardinal Offishall

from the album Fire and Glory
- B-side: "E.G.G."
- Released: March 2006
- Recorded: 2005
- Genre: Canadian hip hop
- Length: 3:57
- Label: EMI; Virgin; Black Jays
- Songwriter(s): J. Harrow
- Producer(s): Kardinal Offishall

Kardinal Offishall singles chronology
| "Everyday (Rudebwoy)" (2005) | "Feel Alright" (2006) | "Last Standing Soldier (Bedouin Remix)" (2006) |

"Feel Alright" is a hip-hop song by Kardinal Offishall. It was the third single from his third album Fire and Glory. A music video, directed by RT!, was released for the single.

== Track listing ==
=== 12" single ===
A-side

1. "Feel Alright" (Clean)
2. "Feel Alright" (Main)
3. "Feel Alright" (Instrumental)

B-side

1. "E.G.G." (Clean) (featuring Vybz Kartel)
2. "E.G.G." (Main) (featuring Vybz Kartel)
3. "E.G.G." (Instrumental)

== Chart positions ==
| Chart (2006) | Peak position |
|---|---|
| Canadian Singles Chart | 40 |
