= Body Bounce =

Single by Kardinal Offishall featuring Akon
- Released: April 6, 2010 (Radio); April 9, 2010 (iTunes)
- Recorded: 2009
- Genre: Canadian hip hop, R&B
- Length: 3:52
- Label: Kon Live/Geffen/Black Jays
- Songwriters: J. Harrow, A. Thiam
- Producer: Haze

Kardinal Offishall single singles chronology
"Freak" (2010)	"Body Bounce" (2010)	"So Much" (2010)

Akon singles chronology
"Push Push" (2010)	"Body Bounce" (2010)	"Angel" (2010)

"Body Bounce" is a hip-hop single by Canadian rapper Kardinal Offishall featuring Akon. Produced by Haze, it was released on iTunes on April 9, 2010. The song has since received platinum certification by Music Canada.

== Chart performance ==
The song debuted on the Canadian Hot 100 at #70, it peaked at #16.

== Charts and certifications ==
=== Chart positions ===
Chart (2010)	Peak position
Canadian Hot 100	16
German Black Charts	5

=== Year-end charts ===
Chart (2010)	Position
Canadian Hot 100	50

=== Certifications ===
Region	Certification	Certified units/sales
Canada (Music Canada)	Platinum	80,000^{‡}
^{‡} Sales+streaming figures based on certification alone.
