= Clear! =

Single by Kardinal Offishall

from the album Mr. International
- Released: July 2009 (Radio); November 24, 2009 (iTunes)
- Recorded: 2009
- Genre: Canadian hip hop, electronic
- Length: 3:23
- Label: Kon Live/Geffen/Black Jays
- Songwriters: J. Harrow, D. Chin-Quee
- Producers: Supa Dups & Kardinal Offishall

Kardinal Offishall singles chronology
"Put Your Drinks Up" (2009)	"Clear!" (2009)	"We Gon' Go" (2009)

"Clear!" is a 2009 non-album single from Kardinal Offishall. The song was produced by Supa Dups and Kardinal Offishall himself. Fatman Scoop is featured at the beginning of the song with him yelling "Kardinal!" The song contains a sample of "Think (About It)" by Lyn Collins.

== Music video ==
The music video is based on Kardinal Offishall touring the Far East. The beginning takes place in Toronto with him at the airport. In the next scene, he performs in Hong Kong. The following location takes place in Beijing and he arrives at Hotel G the night before he does another performance. The last minute of the video shows Kardinal Offishall in Shanghai and Singapore.

== Remix ==
The remix features Elephant Man.

== Chart performance ==
The single debuted on the Canadian Hot 100 at #65, making it his third entry on the chart. It peaked at #57.

=== Chart positions ===
Chart (2009–2010)	Peak position
Canadian Hot 100	57
