= What It Takes (EP) =

EP by Choclair
- Released: 1997
- Recorded: 1996
- Genre: Canadian hip hop
- Label: Knee Deep Records
- Producer: Day (exec.)

Choclair chronology
| What It Takes (1997) | Ice Cold (1999) |

Singles from What It Takes
- 1. "What It Takes Remix" Released: 1997

What It Takes is an EP by Canadian rapper Choclair, released independently in 1997 on Knee Deep Records. It spawned the 12" single "What It Takes Remix", and a music video of the title track was released in 1996. The EP won the award for Best Rap Recording at the 1997 Juno Awards.

== Track listing ==
- All songs produced by Day.

| # | Title | Featured guest(s) | Length |
|---|---|---|---|
| 1. | "What It Takes" | Jully Black | 4:23 |
| 2. | "Just a Second Remix" | Tara Chase and Mike Schell | 3:37 |
| 3. | "The Adventures of Lync (Interlude)" | | 4:55 |
| 4. | "What It Takes Remix" | | 3:50 |
| 5. | "What It Takes (Ill B. Style)" | Afrolistic and K.C. Thomas | 6:00 |
| 6. | "What It Takes" (Instrumental) | | 4:23 |
| 7. | "Just a Second Remix" (Instrumental) | | 3:37 |
| 8. | "The Adventures of Lync (Interlude)" (Instrumental) | | 4:55 |
| 9. | "What It Takes Remix" (Instrumental) | | 3:50 |
| 10. | "What It Takes (Ill B. Style)" (Instrumental) | | 6:00 |
