= Knee Deep Records =

Knee Deep Records (also known as Kneedeep Records) was a Canadian independent record label, specializing in hip hop music.

Based in Toronto, Ontario, Knee Deep was originally a home recording studio. The label was founded in 1995 by record producer Day and rapper Choclair. The label's first 12" single—"Father Time" by Saukrates b/w "Twenty One Years" by Choclair—is considered an underground hip hop classic. In 1996, the label released Kardinal Offishall's first single, "Naughty Dread", which received a Juno Award nomination for Best Rap Recording in 1997; Choclair won the award for his EP, What It Takes. After the label was shut down in the early 2000s, Day and Choclair founded Greenhouse Music in 2003.

== See also ==
- List of record labels
