= BaKardi Slang =

2000 single by Kardinal Offishall

Single by Kardinal Offishall

from the album Quest for Fire: Firestarter, Vol. 1
- B-side: "Ol' Time Killin'"
- Released: 2000 (Canada); 2001 (U.S.)
- Recorded: 2000
- Genre: Canadian hip hop
- Length: 4:33
- Label: MCA Records
- Songwriters: J. Harrow; S. Pitt
- Producer: Solitair

Kardinal Offishall singles chronology
"Money Jane" (2000)	"BaKardi Slang" (2000)	"Ol' Time Killin'" (2001)

"BaKardi Slang" is a hip-hop song by Kardinal Offishall. Produced by Solitair, it was the first single from his second album Quest for Fire: Firestarter, Vol. 1. The single was released in Canada in 2000, before being re-released in the U.S. the following year. It became his first single to appear on a Billboard chart, as well as his first Top 40 hit as a solo artist in Canada.

== Background ==
"BaKardi Slang" was the last song recorded for the Quest for Fire album. According to Kardinal, the song "almost never happened." He was about to drive to a casino with Solitair, and as he backed out of his driveway, Solitair put his beat tape in the system. After Kardinal heard the first beat on the tape (the song's eventual beat), he drove back home and recorded the song.

The anthemic song's lyrics depict the vibe in Toronto. Kardinal breaks down the city's slang in each verse, similar to Big L's song "Ebonics". In the chorus, he refers to himself as "Kardi", which is his nickname. The song popularized Toronto's nickname "T-dot", and became an instant hit in the city.

After the single became popular in Jamaica, dancehall artist Bounty Killer recorded a remix of the song with Kardinal, known as "BaKardi Slang Refix". The song appeared on Bounty Killer's 2002 album Ghetto Dictionary: The Mystery.

== Music video ==
The music video, directed by Kevin De Freitas, begins with Kardinal rapping in the streets of Toronto, before going into a club. Later on, he drives a Hummer through various Toronto neighbourhoods, including Regent Park, Oakwood-Vaughan, and Jane and Finch.

== Track listing ==
=== 12" single ===
A-side

1. "BaKardi Slang" (Radio Edit)
2. "BaKardi Slang" (LP Version)
3. "BaKardi Slang" (Instrumental)

B-side

1. "Ol' Time Killin'" (Radio Edit)
2. "Ol' Time Killin'" (LP Version)

== Chart positions ==
Chart (2001)	Peak position
Canadian Singles Chart	19
U.S. Billboard Hot Rap Singles	37
