= Kill Bill (Brown Eyed Girls song) =

Single by Brown Eyed Girls

from the album Black Box
- Language: Korean
- Released: July 29, 2013
- Recorded: 2013
- Genre: K-pop; electropop; dance-pop
- Length: 3:26
- Label: Nega Network; LOEN
- Songwriters: Kim Eana; Jo Mi-hye
- Producer: Candy Sound

Brown Eyed Girls singles chronology
"Recipe" (2013)	"Kill Bill" (2013)	"Tonight (M&N)" (2013)

Music video
- "KILL BILL(킬빌)" on YouTube

"Kill Bill" (Korean: 킬빌) is a song recorded by South Korean girl group Brown Eyed Girls for their fifth studio album Black Box (2013). Named after the eponymous martial arts films by American director Quentin Tarantino, the electro-pop song was written by the group's long time lyricist Kim Eana and Miryo, while member JeA composed and arranged the song under the moniker Candy Sound. Accompanied with a seven-minute long music video that paid homage to the plot of the inspired film, it was released as the second and final single from Black Box on July 29, 2013, by Nega Network and LOEN Entertainment, to coincide with its parental album release.

Upon its release, "Kill Bill" received positive reviews from critics for its "easy-breezy, Western-themed" pop tune and the competence of all members, further praising member Miryo for her rap performance. The song also attained commercial success for the group, becoming their sixth top ten entry on the Gaon Digital Chart, while earning the group their second, and to date, highest entry on the Billboard World Digital Songs chart, peaking at number twelve. To further promote the song, Brown Eyed Girls appeared on several South Korea television music programs to perform the track, along with their previous single "Recipe".

== Background and release ==
Following the release of "Recipe" on July 9, 2013, to both critical and commercial success, the group released their first image teaser for their upcoming fifth studio album, titled Black Box, on July 23, 2013. A music video teaser was released three days later, confirming the group's next single to be "Kill Bill". Along with the digital release of its parental album, the seven-minute length music video for the single was released on July 29, 2013, while a performance video was later released on August 2, 2013. After its release, the song quickly topped various online charts.

== Composition ==
"Kill Bill" was written by the group's long time lyricist Kim Eana and member Miryo, while production and arrangement was handled by member JeA under her moniker Candy Sound. A dominant electro-pop and dance-pop track, the song begins with an "addictive whistle hook", thus portraying the old Western movie reflection. It also draws comparisons to the work of Dr. Luke by Jeff Benjamin of Billboard, citing its "crunchy synths and lively guitar strumming" with knocking beat as the prime elements. Running a total length of three minutes and twenty-six seconds, it follows the common verse-chorus form, and is composed in the key of D♭ major with a tempo of 128 beats-per-minute. Lyrically, the song is heavily themed around the titular martial arts film by American director Quentin Tarantino, telling the story of a woman "mocking" the man who did her wrong, further "laughing" at his despair that their relationship is over with the hook "So don't you want to kill me?", performed by member Miryo.

== Charts ==
Chart performance for "Kill Bill"
Chart (2013)	Peak position
South Korea (Gaon)	2
