= So Much (Raghav song) =

Single by Raghav featuring Kardinal Offishall

from the album The Phoenix
- Released: May 2010
- Recorded: 2010
- Genre: Dance-pop
- Length: 3:07
- Label: Cordova Bay
- Producer: Labrinth

Raghav singles chronology
"Humrahee" (2009)	"So Much" (2010)

Kardinal Offishall singles chronology
"Body Bounce" (2010)	"So Much" (2010)	"Ghetto Love" (2011)

Music video
- "So Much" on YouTube

"So Much" is a 2010 single by Indo-Canadian singer Raghav featuring Canadian hip hop artist Kardinal Offishall and produced by Labrinth from Raghav's third album entitled The Phoenix. "So Much" was released on the record label Cordova Bay and was a Top 40 feature on many Canadian mainstream music stations. and at MuchMusic pan-Canadian music station. It is also available on iTunes.

This is not the first collaboration by the two artists. They had collaborated earlier on the track "Sooner or Later" featuring vocals by Kardinal Offishall, which is included on Raghav's debut 2004 album Storyteller.

== Music video ==
The video was shot by Mid C Media at iCream, a trendy ice cream shop in Chicago, Illinois. The video was directed by Ken Koller and produced by Koller himself, Jay Chokshi, and executive producers Raghav Mathur and Ranadeb Choudhury.

The video starts with Raghav entering the ice cream store with his friend (J Niice of B96 FM Chicago). In most of the video, Raghav is following a feminine love interest (played by model Danielle Fornarelli) as she moves around the shop, or Raghav is singing and dancing with prominence of red and blue lens used in most of the video, or just black and white shots. The song's producer Labrinth does his own thing at the background of the Raghav shots. Kardinal Offishal joins in towards the end of the video dueting with Raghav. The final scene shows an ordinary man tasting his own choice order of ice cream.

== Remixes ==
The neoDesi personality DJ Nihal premiered a remix of "So Much" on his BBC Radio One show on 22 June 2010. The Desi version of the track features Bhangra star H-Dhami who sings an electro-pop Punjabi verse. Another version of the track features grime artist Bashy.

== Nominations ==
- The song was nominated for "R&B/Soul Recording of the Year" at the Juno Awards of 2011.
