= A.M.T.R.I.M. =

A.M.T.R.I.M. (Allow Me to Re-Introduce Myself)

Mixtape by Kardinal Offishall and Nottz
- Released: June 15, 2012
- Recorded: 2010–2011
- Genre: Hip-hop
- Length: 65:16
- Producer: Nottz

Kardinal Offishall chronology
Not 4 Sale (2008)	A.M.T.R.I.M. (2012)	Kardi Gras, Vol. 1: The Clash (2015)

Nottz chronology
Rawth EP (2010)	Allow Me to Re-Introduce Myself (2012)	Gods in the Spirit (2013)

Allow Me to Re-Introduce Myself, also known as A.M.T.R.I.M., is a collaborative mixtape album by Canadian rapper Kardinal Offishall and American hip-hop producer Nottz, released June 15, 2012. Originally recorded as a studio album, they decided to release it as a free download for their fans.

== Background ==
Kardinal began working with Nottz in 2002, and their first collaboration, "Sick!", was released the following year as a B-side of Kardinal's "Belly Dancer" single. Since then, they've collaborated numerous times, with Nottz's production appearing on Kardinal's Kill Bloodclott Bill mixtape and Not 4 Sale album, and with Kardinal making appearances on Nottz's You Need This Music album and Rawth EP (with Asher Roth).

The project was announced in early 2011. Originally titled Seven, Kardinal and Nottz recorded it in seven days, though some tracks were added later. Lyrical themes on the mixtape range from gun violence in Toronto on "Kill Shot", to education on "Mr. Parker"; both songs spawned music videos. The mixtape features shoutouts from several notable hip-hop artists and producers, including Bun B, DJ Green Lantern, Boi-1da, and Pete Rock, among others.

== Reception ==
Professional ratings
Review scores
Source	Rating
Urbanology Magazine	favorable

Urbanology Magazine gave the mixtape a favorable review, stating that it "combines Nottz' cartoonish beats and Kardi's animated flow making for a perfect match," also calling it "a great reintroduction to familiar faces."

== Track listing ==
- All songs produced by Nottz.

No.	Title	Length
1.	"Invention of Truth"	3:31
2.	"Get It In (B4 I Go)"	3:46
3.	"Kill Shot"	4:38
4.	"1st 48"	3:58
5.	"Over 4 (Love Is Gone)" (featuring Big Shot Manceeni)	5:14
6.	"Motivation" (featuring Big Pooh and May Marquardt)	4:49
7.	"Electric Sexy" (featuring Nottz and Ray Robinson)	5:37
8.	"Mr. Parker" (featuring Shi Wisdom)	4:52
9.	"Nobody Else (Get Off Me)" (featuring Peter Jericho)	3:02
10.	"Take It There" (featuring Nottz and Peter Jericho)	3:45
11.	"Refreshed" (featuring Nikki Grier and Angus Black)	6:35
12.	"I Wish I Could Talk to You" (featuring Peter Jericho)	6:00
13.	"Reach High" (featuring Yummy Bingham)	5:00
14.	"Murderah"	4:38

== Samples ==
- "Kill Shot" contains excerpts from the film Date Night
- "Mr. Parker" contains a sample of "I Want You Back (A cappella)" by The Jackson 5
- "I Wish I Could Talk to You" contains a sample of "Wish That I Could Talk to You" by The Sylvers
