= Kardi Gras, Vol. 1: The Clash =

Studio album by Kardinal Offishall
- Released: October 30, 2015 (Canada)
- Recorded: 2014–2015
- Genre: Canadian hip hop
- Length: 67:45
- Labels: Black Stone Colleagues; Universal Music Canada
- Producers: Kardinal Offishall; Agile

Kardinal Offishall chronology
A.M.T.R.I.M. (2012)	Kardi Gras, Vol. 1: The Clash (2015)	Firestarter Vol. 2: Everyday, Sometimes… (2026)

Singles from Kardi Gras, Vol. 1: The Clash
- 1. "That Chick Right There" Released: 2014; 2. "Baby It's U!" Released: 2015

Professional ratings
Review scores
Source	Rating
Exclaim!	6/10
Music Express	favorable
Ride the Tempo	3/5 stars

Kardi Gras, Vol. 1: The Clash is the fifth studio album by Canadian rapper Kardinal Offishall, released October 30, 2015 on his independent label Black Stone Colleagues Inc. and Universal Music Canada. It is his first studio album in seven years. The first single, "That Chick Right There" (featuring Chaisson), peaked at #68 on the Canadian Hot 100.

== Track listing ==
#	Title	Featured guest(s)	Producer(s)	Length
1.	"Hope"	Merna	Kardinal Offishall	5:39
2.	"Baby It's U!"		Kardinal Offishall	3:47
3.	"OG"	Assassin	Kardinal Offishall	4:27
4.	"No Reason"		Kardinal Offishall	3:58
5.	"To Kill a Shadow"	May	Kardinal Offishall	5:06
6.	"C.O.D."		Kardinal Offishall	4:09
7.	"Real Live Gangsta (They Say)"	Junior Reid	Kardinal Offishall	4:59
8.	"Always Carnival Time"	KES the Band & Quinn Marie	Kardinal Offishall	3:53
9.	"Insert Here"	Haley Smalls	Agile	3:16
10.	"One Dream Away"	Stephen Marley	Kardinal Offishall	4:29
11.	"The Naked Truth"	Glenn Lewis	Kardinal Offishall	3:46
12.	"Sunshine"	JRDN	Kardinal Offishall	3:46
13.	"That Chick Right There"	Chaisson	Kardinal Offishall	3:47
14.	"Do Dat Dance"		Kardinal Offishall	4:12
15.	"I'm Just a Man"	Allan Rayman	Kardinal Offishall	4:35
16.	"Tattoo (Rudebwoy)"	Glenn Lewis	Kardinal Offishall	3:25
