= Everyday (Rudebwoy) =

Hip-hop song by Kardinal Offishall featuring Ray Robinson

Single by Kardinal Offishall featuring Ray Robinson

from the album Fire and Glory
- Released: October 2005
- Recorded: 2005
- Genre: Canadian hip hop
- Length: 4:11 (single version); 5:06 (album version)
- Label: EMI; Virgin; Black Jays
- Songwriter(s): J. Harrow; C. Grant; R. Klyne
- Producer(s): Kardinal Offishall

Kardinal Offishall singles chronology
"Heads Up" (2005)	"Everyday (Rudebwoy)" (2005)	"Feel Alright" (2006)

"Everyday (Rudebwoy)" is a hip-hop song by Kardinal Offishall featuring Ray Robinson. It was the second single from his third album Fire and Glory.

The song samples the backing track "People Everyday" by Arrested Development, and also includes an interpolation of that song's chorus (which itself is an interpolation of the chorus of the Sly and the Family Stone song "Everyday People"). It was successful in Canada, peaking at #16 on the Canadian Singles Chart. The music video, directed by RT!, earned three MuchMusic Video Awards in June 2006.

== Chart positions ==
Chart (2005)	Peak position
Canadian Singles Chart	16
