= Ol' Time Killin' =

2001 single by Kardinal Offishall and Jully Black

Single by Kardinal Offishall featuring Jully Black, Allistair, IRS, and Wio-K

from the album Quest for Fire: Firestarter, Vol. 1
- B-side: "Maxine"
- Released: 2001
- Recorded: 2000
- Genre: Canadian hip hop
- Length: 4:39
- Label: MCA Records
- Songwriter(s): J. Harrow; K. Downey; A. Phillips
- Producer(s): Mr. Attic

Kardinal Offishall singles chronology
"BaKardi Slang" (2001)	"Ol' Time Killin'" (2001)	"Belly Dancer" (2003)

"Ol' Time Killin'" is a hip-hop song by Kardinal Offishall featuring Jully Black, Allistair, IRS, and Wio-K, released in 2001. Produced by Mr. Attic, it was the second single from his second album Quest for Fire: Firestarter, Vol. 1.

== Background ==
One day after performing at a club in New York City, Kardinal was in his hotel room talking to Saukrates, when he heard an infectious beat coming from downstairs. Saukrates told him that Mr. Attic of Da Grassroots was playing beats in his room, then Kardinal went downstairs to check it out. In an interview, he said:

Attic has these interludes that are the craziest beats you've ever heard, but to him they’re just interludes. Ol' Time Killin' was a 20-second interlude on his beat CD, so I kept hearing this beat coming and I had to write the whole song to that. 'This is not an interlude, this is crazy!'

The featured rappers, Wio-K and IRS (Korry Deez and Black Cat) from Scarborough's Monolith crew, were chosen by Kardinal, because he used to hang out with them, and musically, they shared the same level of energy. In order, Kardinal, Wio-K, and Korry Deez perform the first verse, followed by Black Cat and Kardinal in the second verse, followed by Kardinal, Korry Deez, Wio-K, and Black Cat in the third verse. Jully Black and Allistair sing the chorus and outro.

Samples

The song's chorus contains samples from "The MC" by KRS-One, "Murderer" by Barrington Levy, and "Murder She Wrote" by Chaka Demus & Pliers.

Remix

The remix features Busta Rhymes.

Part 2

In 2011, Kardinal released "Anywhere (Ol' Time Killin' Part 2)".

== Music video ==
The music video was shot by Little X, as he was then named (now Director X), on a $100,000 budget. It used a brand new visual concept which was never seen on TV before. After the video was released, many people in the hip hop industry became a fan of Kardinal, including Pharrell Williams, Clipse, and Pete Rock. The song "Maxine" is featured at the end of the video.

== Track listing ==
=== CD single ===
1. "Ol' Time Killin'" (Radio Edit Version)
2. "Ol' Time Killin'" (Instrumental)
3. "Money Jane" (Remix)
4. "Maxine" (Radio Edit Version)
5. "Maxine" (TV track)
6. "Ol' Time Killin'" (LP Version)

== Chart positions ==
Chart (2001)	Peak position
Canadian Singles Chart	32
