= Mr. Roam =

Canadian rapper

- Origin: Canada
- Genres: Rap

Mr. Roam is a Canadian rapper. His album Tom Strokes Presents the ClasSix Plus Six received a Juno Award nomination for Rap Recording of the Year at the Juno Awards of 2004. Active in the 1990s as Mr. Roam from the Plant, he played a key role in securing label deals for Ghetto Concept and Da Grassroots, and was a featured artist on several tracks from Da Grassroots' album Passage Through Time. His debut single as a solo artist, "Groupie Central" b/w "Sunny Kiss Is Wack", was released in 2000. He released the six-song EP Tom Strokes Presents the Classix in early 2003, and followed up later in the year with the full-length ClasSix Plus Six.
