= Ghetto Love (Melvin Riley album) =

Studio album by Melvin Riley
- Released: June 21, 1994
- Label: MCA

Melvin Riley chronology
Ghetto Love (1994)	Bedroom Stories (2000)

Ghetto Love is the debut studio album of Melvin Riley, formerly part of Ready for the World. It was released on June 21, 1994 via MCA Records.

== Critical reception ==
Eugene Bowen of The Michigan Daily called it "a handsomely produced, 15-cut LP" and a "mountainously spectacular CD". He praised the album's "good mix of fast and slow cuts" and stated that "the album's positives far outstrip its negatives."

== Charts ==
Chart (1994)	Peak position
US Top R&B Albums (Billboard)	29
US Heatseekers Albums (Billboard)	7
