= Husslin' =

EP by Kardinal Offishall
- Released: April 11, 2000
- Recorded: 1999
- Genre: Canadian hip hop
- Label: Fat Beats; Figure IV
- Producer: Kardinal Offishall; Saukrates; Solitair; Bootleg

Kardinal Offishall chronology
Eye & I (1997)	Husslin' (2000)	Quest for Fire: Firestarter, Vol. 1 (2001)

Singles from Husslin'
- 1. "Husslin'" Released: 2000

Husslin' is an EP by Canadian rapper Kardinal Offishall, released independently on April 11, 2000, on Figure IV Entertainment, and distributed by Fat Beats Records in the United States. The title track, "Husslin'", was one of the hottest 12" singles of 2000. "And What?", featuring Saukrates, was released as a single in 1999. "Husslin'" and "Mic T.H.U.G.S." also appear on Kardinal's second studio album, Quest for Fire: Firestarter, Vol. 1. An updated version of "U R Ghetto When", known as "U R Ghetto 2002", is on the Quest for Fire album.

== Reception ==
Professional ratings
Review scores
Source	Rating
AllMusic	3/5 stars
Exclaim!	favorable

AllMusic stated "Husslin' offers just a peek of the best that Canadian hip-hop has to offer," also praising Kardinal as "Canada's best hip-hop producer." The EP was nominated for Best Rap Recording at the 2001 Juno Awards.

== Track listing ==
#	Title	Producer(s)
1.	"Mic T.H.U.G.S."	Kardinal Offishall
2.	"Husslin'" (Clean)	Kardinal Offishall
3.	"U R Ghetto When"	Saukrates (co-produced by Bootleg)
4.	"And What?" (feat. Saukrates)	Solitair
5.	"Mic T.H.U.G.S." (Clean)	Kardinal Offishall
6.	"U R Ghetto When" (Clean)	Saukrates (co-produced by Bootleg)

== Samples ==
- "Mic T.H.U.G.S." contains a sample of "Eazy-Duz-It" by Eazy-E
- "U R Ghetto When" contains a sample of "Elegant Evening" by The Crusaders
