= Let's Ride (Choclair song) =

Single by Choclair

from the album Ice Cold
- B-side: "Bare Witness"
- Released: 1999
- Genre: Canadian hip hop
- Length: 4:21
- Label: Virgin; Priority
- Songwriters: K. Blake; J. Harrow
- Producer: Kardinal Offishall

Choclair singles chronology
"Northern Touch" (1998)	"Let's Ride" (1999)	"Rubbin'" (2000)

"Let's Ride" is the first single from Canadian rapper Choclair's debut album, Ice Cold. Produced by Kardinal Offishall, the song features ad-libs by Saukrates. The song is well known for its catchy piano hook and chorus. Commercially, "Let's Ride" reached number 31 in Canada and number 37 on the US Billboard Hot Rap Songs chart.

== Music video ==
Directed by Little X, most of the music video was shot in Downtown Toronto. It begins with Choclair driving a Mercedes-Benz convertible, with a female passenger. In the next scene, he is a passenger on a motorcycle. In the third scene he drives a Hummer, with Kardinal Offishall as his passenger. In the final scene, Choclair rides on a bicycle alongside Saukrates.

== Track listing ==
12" single

A-side

1. "Let's Ride" (Radio Edit)
2. "Let's Ride" (Main Mix)
3. "Let's Ride" (Instrumental)

B-side

1. "Bare Witness" (Radio Edit) (featuring Guru)
2. "Bare Witness" (Main Mix) (featuring Guru)
3. "Bare Witness" (Instrumental)

== Charts ==
Chart (2000)	Peak position
Canada Top Singles (RPM)	38
Canada Dance/Urban (RPM)	19
US Hot Rap Songs (Billboard)	37

== Other appearances ==
- The instrumental is heard at the beginning and ending of Kardinal Offishall's 1997 music video for "On wit da Show".
- The song is featured on the soundtracks of 3 Strikes and NBA Live 2001.
- The song is the opening and ending theme song for the first season of the Canadian television comedy series The Office Movers.
