= Ghetto Love (Karl Wolf song) =

Single by Karl Wolf featuring Kardinal Offishall

from the album Finally Free
- Released: May 17, 2011
- Recorded: 2011 at Metalworks Studios in Mississauga, Ontario
- Genre: Pop rap
- Label: Universal Republic
- Songwriter(s): Karl Wolf, Kardinal Offishall (rap); Peter Cetera, David Foster; Diane Nini (refrain sample)
- Producer(s): Karl Wolf, UnderGround Procedures (UGP)

Karl Wolf singles chronology
"80's Baby" (2010)	"Ghetto Love" (2011)	"Mash It Up / Fuck Shit Up" (2011)

Kardinal Offishall singles chronology
"So Much" (2010)	"Ghetto Love" (2011)

Music video
- "Ghetto Love" on YouTube

"Ghetto Love" is a 2011 single by Canadian artist Karl Wolf from his 2012 album Finally Free. The single released in May 2011 features Canadian artist Kardinal Offishall with downloads made available on May 17, 2011.

The song co-produced with UnderGround Procedures (UGP) also mentioned in the introductory part of the song, samples in its refrain on the Peter Cetera song "Glory of Love". However "Ghetto Love" is a separate song rather than a cover version of "Glory of Love" because of its added rap lyrics. Most notably Karl Wolf changes the original "we did it all for the glory of love" to "we did it all for this ghetto ghetto love" and in addition, "I am a man" is replaced by "I am the man." A French version also exists, but retains the English-language chorus.

== Track list ==
- Ghetto Love (feat. Kardinal Offishall) (3:04)
- Ghetto Love (No Rap version) (3:05)

== Music video ==
The music video for the release was by Director X and it was filmed in Jamaica.

== Charts ==
Chart (2011)	Peak Position
Canadian Hot 100	20
