= Artists Against Bullying =

Canadian musical advocacy group

- Origin: Ontario, Canada
- Years active: 2012
- Labels: Wax
- Past members: Lights; Pierre Bouvier; Jacob Hoggard; Fefe Dobson; Kardinal Offishall; Alyssa Reid; Walk Off the Earth

Artists Against Bullying (often styled as "Artists Against") was an agglomeration of seven Canadian musicians who united in 2012 to re-record the song "True Colors" by Cyndi Lauper.

Released during Bullying Awareness Week, the project was inspired by the increase in teen bullying and cyberbullying, especially the Amanda Todd case, with proceeds being donated to Kids Help Phone – a Canadian counseling service for children and youth.

== Reception ==
The song entered the Canadian Singles Top 100 chart at number 10 the week it was released.
