= On wit da Show =

Single by Kardinal Offishall

from the album Eye & I
- B-side: "Naughty Dread II"
- Released: 1997
- Recorded: 1997
- Genre: Canadian hip hop
- Length: 4:06
- Label: Capitol Hill Music
- Songwriter(s): J. Harrow
- Producer(s): Kardinal Offishall

Kardinal Offishall singles chronology
"Naughty Dread" (1996)	"On wit da Show" (1997)	"Northern Touch" (1998)

"On wit da Show" (also known as "On wid da Show") is a hip-hop song by Kardinal Offishall. It was the only single from his debut album Eye & I. The song also appears on his second album, Quest for Fire: Firestarter, Vol. 1. The original version of the song was released in 1996 as a B-side of "Naughty Dread". In 1997 Kardinal recorded a remix of the original, which was released as a single.

== Music video ==
In the music video, Kardinal Offishall is shown rapping at a house party. The video was in regular rotation on MuchMusic, however, it was temporarily pulled by the channel, because an extra went to the video shoot with his security guard uniform on. The security company's logo was later censored. At the beginning and ending of the video, the instrumental of "Let's Ride" by Choclair is playing in the background.

== Track listing ==
=== 12" single ===
A-side

1. "On wit da Show" (Radio)
2. "On wit da Show" (Raw Mix)
3. "On wit da Show" (Instrumental)

B-side

1. "Naughty Dread II" (Radio)
2. "Naughty Dread II" (Original)
3. "Naughty Dread II" (Instrumental)
4. "Naughty Dread II" (Remix) (featuring Saukrates)

== Chart positions ==
Chart (1998)	Peak position
Canadian Singles Chart	91
