= Da Grassroots =

Canadian hip hop production team

- Also known as: Da Grass Roots Music
- Origin: Toronto, Ontario, Canada
- Genre: Canadian hip hop
- Occupation: Record producers
- Instruments: Sampler, keyboard, turntable
- Years active: 1989–present
- Labels: Black Employed Records, Conception Records
- Members: Mr. Attic; Mr. Murray
- Past members: Swiff (deceased)

Da Grassroots is a Canadian hip-hop production team from Toronto, Ontario, composed of Mr. Attic, Mr. Murray, and Swiff. The Juno Award-winning group contributed to the development of Toronto hip-hop throughout the 1990s, highlighted by the release of their debut album Passage Through Time in 1999.

In 1994, they were featured in Andrew Munger's documentary film Make Some Noise.

After the underground success of their album, each member began working on various solo projects. Mr. Attic co-founded Choice Cut Records, Mr. Murray produced for LAL, and Swiff produced for artists on the group's Black Employed Records label.

On July 31, 2018, Swiff died of cancer at the age of 47.

== Discography ==
=== Albums ===
- Passage Through Time (1999)

=== Singles ===
- "Drama" (featuring Elemental) (1995)
- "Price of Livin'" (featuring Mr. Roam) (1999)
- "Thematics" (featuring Arcee) (1999)
- "Body Language" (featuring Choclair and Saukrates) (2000)

=== Production credits ===
(Not including songs from Passage Through Time or Mr. Attic's solo production credits.)

1993

- "Certified", "Certified (Remix)", "Dungeon", "Mista Crack Ed" – Ghetto Concept

1994

- "Deifitrec", "Certified (808)" – Ghetto Concept
- "No Dingbats Allowed" – Dream Warriors

1995

- "E-Z on tha Motion" – Ghetto Concept

1996

- "Ninty Sixness" – Diemen X (produced by Swiff)
- "Who's Talking Weight (Remix)" – Red Life (produced by Swiff)

1998

- "Ya Done Know" – Red Life (produced by Swiff)

1999

- "Ice Cold" – Choclair

2000

- "Ever Since (Da Grassroots Remix)" – Maestro (produced by Swiff)
- "Ripped Mee Off" (produced by Swiff), "Lady Luck (The Darkside)" (produced by Mr. Murray) – Michie Mee
- "Let's Make a Record Deal Episode 1" – Mastermind feat. D-Sisive (produced by Swiff)
- "Bump!" – Mastermind feat. Choclair and Mr. Roam (produced by Swiff)
- "Let's Make a Record Deal Episode 3" – Mastermind feat. Citizen Kane (produced by Mr. Murray)
- "Marvel Interlude", "Arcee Interlude" – Mastermind (produced by Swiff)

== Awards and nominations ==
- 1995 Juno Awards
  - Best Rap Recording for "Certified" (Won)
- 1996 Juno Awards
  - Best Rap Recording for "E-Z on tha Motion" (Won)
  - Best Rap Recording for "Drama" (Nominated)
