= IRS (band) =

Canadian hip hop group

- Origin: Toronto, Ontario, Canada
- Genres: Canadian hip hop
- Years active: 1990s-2000s
- Labels: Universal Music Canada
- Past members: Korry "Korry Deez" Downey; Black Cat; T.R.A.C.K.S.

IRS, an initialism for Instinctive Reaction to Struggle, was a Canadian hip hop band from Toronto, Ontario, active in the early 2000s. They are most noted for their 2003 album Welcome to Planet IRS, which received a Juno Award nomination for Rap Recording of the Year at the Juno Awards of 2004.

The group was formed in Scarborough in the late 1990s by rappers Korry "Korry Deez" Downey and Black Cat and producer T.R.A.C.K.S., all of whom had previously been associated with the hip hop crew Monolith. They released a number of 7" and 12" singles in their early years, toured as supporting performers for Kardinal Offishall (appearing on his hit "Ol' Time Killin'"), and appeared as featured guest performers on the Rascalz song "Dun Did It", from their 2002 album Reloaded.

They signed to Universal Music Canada in early 2003, and released Welcome to Planet IRS on that label in 2003. The album's most successful single was "T-Dot Anthem".

They did not release any further albums as a group. T.R.A.C.K.S. next collaborated with Saukrates in the group Big Black Lincoln; Korry Deez has released albums as a solo artist, although both T.R.A.C.K.S. and Black Cat have continued to appear on them as collaborators.
