= Not 4 Sale (Kardinal Offishall album) =

Studio album by Kardinal Offishall
- Released: September 9, 2008
- Recorded: 2006–2008
- Genre: Hip hop
- Length: 63:03
- Labels: Black Jays; Kon Live; Geffen
- Producers: Kardinal Offishall (exec.); Akon (exec.); Devyne Stephens (exec.); Shawn Holiday (exec.); Nottz; Supa Dups; Jake One; DJ Kemo & hAZEL; Alex da Kid; Boi-1da; Shea Taylor; Hakim Abdulsamad

Kardinal Offishall chronology
| Fire and Glory (2005) | Not 4 Sale (2008) | A.M.T.R.I.M. (2012) |

Singles from Not 4 Sale
- 1. "Dangerous" Released: March 2008; 2. "Burnt" Released: July 15, 2008; 3. "Set It Off" Released: July 15, 2008; 4. "Numba 1 (Tide Is High)" Released: September 2008

Not 4 Sale is the fourth studio album by Canadian rapper Kardinal Offishall, released September 9, 2008 on Black Jays, Kon Live Distribution, and Geffen Records. It is his second international major-label album after Quest for Fire: Firestarter, Vol. 1, released in 2001. It was a critical success, and included the top five Billboard Hot 100 single "Dangerous", and the minor hit "Numba 1 (Tide Is High)".

== Background ==
On July 2, 2007, the single "Graveyard Shift", featuring Akon, was premiered on Sirius Satellite Radio's Hip-Hop Nation channel. It was originally the album's first single. In March 2008, the first single "Dangerous", also featuring Akon, was released. It proved to be Kardinal's most successful single, peaking at number five on the Billboard Hot 100.

In June 2008, Kardinal released the mixtape, Limited Time Only, which had snippets of five songs that would appear on the album. One of those songs, "Burnt", featuring Lindo P, was accompanied by a music video in late June. On July 15, "Burnt" and "Set It Off" featuring Clipse, were released on iTunes; In August, a music video was released for "Set It Off". The song "Numba 1 (Tide Is High)", featuring Rihanna, is a cover of the reggae song "The Tide Is High". The version featuring Keri Hilson is the album's fourth single. A music video was released for the song "Nina", though it was not released as a single.

Kardinal's idea for the album title was from a custom-made T-shirt which read "Not 4 Sale" and had a bar code on it. Kardinal explained why he chose Not 4 Sale as the title:

My idea was something provocative — that went beyond gender, went beyond race, went beyond what type of music you're into. And people would literally stop me on the street, telling me how dope the shirt was, how similarly they felt. The concept grew in my head based on that reaction. There's energy you can't buy — the essence of people that can't be bought or bottled, and lives within them. That's how I feel about myself — I can't be bought.

== Reception ==
Professional ratings
Review scores
| Source | Rating |
|---|---|
| AllMusic | 4/5 stars |
| Blender | 3/5 stars |
| Eye Weekly | 3/5 stars |
| People | 3/4 stars |
| PopMatters | 6/10 |
| RapReviews | 7/10 |
| USA Today | 3/4 stars |

The album sold 11,869 copies in the United States in its first week of release. It entered the Billboard 200 at number 40. As of February 15, 2009, the album has sold 34,822 copies. In Canada, it entered the Canadian Albums Chart at number eight, with 4,247 copies sold in the first week.

The album received generally favorable reviews from music critics. AllMusic gave it 4 out of 5 stars, calling it "an entirely solid album," also stating "this freedom fighting and socially conscious writing is tempered with hooky club tracks that never fail." USA Today gave it 3 out of 4 stars, noting "his potent blend of hip-hop and dancehall gives him a flavor all his own." PopMatters gave the album a 6/10 rating, writing "although many of the tracks here are glossy pop productions, Kardinal has not really changed since he was first heard in the '90s." The album won the award for Rap Recording of the Year at the 2009 Juno Awards.

== Track listing ==
Standard edition
| No. | Title | Writer(s) | Producer(s) | Length |
|---|---|---|---|---|
| 1. | "Burnt" (featuring Lindo P) | Jason Harrow; Lindo Parkes; Shea Taylor | Shea Taylor | 4:56 |
| 2. | "Set It Off" (featuring Clipse) | Harrow; Matthew Samuels; Gene Thornton; Terrence Thornton | Boi-1da | 4:38 |
| 3. | "Dangerous" (featuring Akon) | Harrow; Aliaune Thiam; Donald Sales; Cristian Bahamonde | DJ Kemo; hAZEL | 4:11 |
| 4. | "Digital Motown" (featuring J*Davey) | Harrow; Jacob Dutton; D. Vaughn | Jake One | 3:47 |
| 5. | "Gimme Some" (featuring The-Dream) | Harrow; Samuels; Terius Nash | Boi-1da | 4:16 |
| 6. | "Bad Like We Bad" | Harrow | Kardinal Offishall | 3:40 |
| 7. | "Numba 1 (Tide Is High)" (featuring Rihanna) | Harrow; Dwayne Chin-Quee; John Holt | Supa Dups | 3:43 |
| 8. | "Ill Eagle Alien" | Harrow; Dominick Lamb; Sting | Nottz | 4:54 |
| 9. | "Nina" | Harrow; Chin-Quee; Edward Lee; Martin Riley; Lloyd Tyrell | Supa Dups | 3:14 |
| 10. | "Go Home with You" (featuring T-Pain) | Harrow; Andrew Thompson; Faheem Najm | Kardinal Offishall | 4:17 |
| 11. | "Going In" | Harrow; Alexander Grant | Alex da Kid | 4:00 |
| 12. | "Bring the Fire Out" | Harrow; Samuels | Boi-1da | 3:06 |
| 13. | "Family Tree (Still Eyerize)" (featuring Glenn Lewis) | Harrow; Glenn Lewis | Kardinal Offishall | 4:00 |
| 14. | "Due Me a Favour" (featuring Estelle) | Harrow; Thiam; Hakim Abdulsamad | Akon; Hakim Abdulsamad (co.) | 6:23 |
| 15. | "Lighter!" | Harrow; Samuels | Boi-1da | 4:12 |

iTunes Store bonus tracks
| No. | Title | Writer(s) | Producer(s) | Length |
|---|---|---|---|---|
| 16. | "Dangerous (Remix)" (featuring Akon and Sean Paul) | Harrow; Thiam; Sales; Bahamonde; Sean Paul Henriques | DJ Kemo; hAZEL | 4:35 |

== Samples and interpolations ==
- "Numba 1 (Tide Is High)" contains an interpolation of "The Tide Is High" by The Paragons
- "Ill Eagle Alien" contains an interpolation of "Englishman in New York" by Sting
- "Nina" contains excerpts from "My Conversation" by Slim Smith & The Uniques

== Chart positions ==
| Chart (2008) | Peak position |
|---|---|
| Canadian Albums Chart | 8 |
| French Albums Chart | 105 |
| U.S. Billboard 200 | 40 |
| U.S. Billboard Top R&B/Hip-Hop Albums | 10 |
| U.S. Billboard Top Rap Albums | 7 |

== Personnel ==
- Hakim Abdulsamad – producer
- Chris Athens – mastering
- Leslie Brathwaite – mixing
- Bryan Brock – art direction, design
- Danny Reid Carter – A&R
- Mike "Angry" Eleopoulos – engineer
- Cliff Feiman – production supervisor
- Jeremy Harding – mixing
- Shawn Holiday "Tubby" – executive producer, A&R
- Jason Joshua – mixing
- Tyson Kuteyi – mixing, vocal mixing
- Glenn Lewis – composer
- Paul Marshall – engineer
- Martin Riley – composer
- Fareed Salamah – mixing assistant
- James "Scrappy" Stassen – engineer
- Devyne Stephens – executive producer
- Aliaune "Akon" Thiam – producer, executive producer
- Lloyd Tyrell – composer
- Ianthe Zevos – creative art

== Certifications ==
Certifications for Not 4 Sale
| Region | Certification | Certified units/sales |
|---|---|---|
| New Zealand (RMNZ) | Gold | 7,500^{‡} |
^{‡} Sales+streaming figures based on certification alone.

== Release history ==
| Region | Date |
|---|---|
| Canada | September 9, 2008 |
| United States | September 9, 2008 |
| Japan | September 24, 2008 |
| United Kingdom | September 29, 2008 |
