= Bang Bang (Kardinal Offishall song) =

Single by Kardinal Offishall

from the album Kill Bloodclott Bill
- B-side: "Bumboclawt (Lean Back)"
- Released: 2004
- Recorded: 2004
- Genre: Canadian hip hop
- Length: 3:48
- Label: M3 Entertainment
- Songwriter(s): J. Harrow
- Producer(s): Kardinal Offishall

Kardinal Offishall singles chronology
"Tear de Wallz Down" (2004)	"Bang Bang" (2004)	"Heads Up" (2005)

"Bang Bang" is a hip-hop song by Kardinal Offishall. Released in 2004, the single appears on his mixtape, Kill Bloodclott Bill. The song, which contains a sample of "Bang, Bang" by Nancy Sinatra, was nominated for Rap Recording of the Year at the 2005 Juno Awards.

In 2003, Kardinal's album Firestarter Vol. 2: The F-Word Theory was shelved after Geffen Records absorbed his label, MCA Records. The song was directed at major labels, which he referred to as "Bill". In the third verse he raps: "This ain't just some music story / It's about how real niggas return for glory / Bill tried to leave me out in the cold to die / I told y'all before we just multiply."

== Track listing ==
=== 12" single ===
A-side

1. "Bang Bang" (Clean)
2. "Bang Bang" (Dirty)
3. "Bang Bang" (Instrumental)

B-side

1. "Bumboclawt (Lean Back)" (Clean)
2. "Bumboclawt (Lean Back)" (Dirty)
3. "'Ood 'Op"
