= Figure IV Entertainment =

Figure IV Entertainment was a Canadian independent record label, specializing in hip hop music.

Based in Vancouver, British Columbia (with another office in New York City), the label was co-founded in 1994 by Sol Guy, to manage his group Rascalz. In 1998, the label released the groundbreaking Rascalz single "Northern Touch", which won a Juno Award for Best Rap Recording the following year. The roster later expanded to include Kardinal Offishall and k-os among others. In 2000, the label released "Husslin'" by Kardinal Offishall, which was one of the hottest 12" singles of the year, and it quickly became an underground favorite. The next year, Guy left the label to pursue other interests.

== See also ==
- List of record labels
