= Quest for Fire: Firestarter, Vol. 1 =

Studio album by Kardinal Offishall
- Released: May 22, 2001
- Recorded: 1997–2000
- Genre: Canadian hip hop
- Length: 66:40
- Label: MCA
- Producer: YLook (exec.); Anne-Marie Smith (exec.); Figure IV Ent. (co-exec.); Kardinal Offishall (also co-exec.); Solitair; Saukrates; Tara Chase; Mr. Attic; Yaadmaneverywhere!

Kardinal Offishall chronology
Husslin' (2000)	Quest for Fire: Firestarter, Vol. 1 (2001)	Fire and Glory (2005)

Singles from Quest for Fire: Firestarter, Vol. 1
- 1. "BaKardi Slang" Released: 2001; 2. "Ol' Time Killin'" Released: 2001

Quest for Fire: Firestarter, Vol. 1 is the second studio album by Canadian rapper Kardinal Offishall. It was released on MCA Records, his first album for a major label. It is a recompilation album, which includes older songs and demos that he used to get signed. The lead single, "BaKardi Slang", became his first single to appear on a Billboard chart. The second single, "Ol' Time Killin'", was a minor hit. The album received generally favorable reviews from music critics.

== Background ==
In August 2000, Kardinal signed a deal with MCA Records, after the underground success of his EP, Husslin'. The strategy of the MCA project was to license his older material and release it as an album, to familiarize consumers with him. It wasn't meant to be a big-budget album. The album helped introduce the world to the "T-dot sound", and Kardinal's reggae and dancehall-influenced style of hip-hop.

The album's first single was "BaKardi Slang", which appeared on the Billboard Hot Rap Singles chart. In the anthemic song, Kardinal breaks down Toronto's slang. The second single, "Ol' Time Killin'", received heavy rotation on music video channels. A video for "Powerfulll" was released in Canada.

The songs "On wid da Show" and "Husslin'" are previous singles, released in 1997 and 2000 respectively. A remix of "Money Jane", originally released in 2000, also appears on the album. In the song "U R Ghetto 2002", he disses American rapper Bishop for copying his idea, which originated from the song "U R Ghetto When".

== Reception ==
Professional ratings
Review scores
Source	Rating
AllMusic	2.5/5 stars
The A.V. Club	favorable
RapReviews	7/10
The Source	3.5/5 stars
URB	favorable

One year after its release, 25,000 copies of the album were sold in Canada. It received generally favorable reviews from music critics. The Source gave the album 3½ out of 5 mics. RapReviews.com gave it a 7/10 rating, calling it a "mixed bag," and stating "there are also some perfect 10's to be found here." The A.V. Club gave the album a favorable review, praising its "impressive musical and lyrical consistency." AllMusic gave it 2½ out of 5 stars, noting that Kardinal "displays only flashes of promise here." The album was nominated for Best Rap Recording at the 2002 Juno Awards.

In 2021, the album won the inaugural edition of CBC Music's Canada Listens competition, a musical version of the CBC's long-running Canada Reads. It was defended by writer and broadcaster Kathleen Newman-Bremang.

== Track listing ==
#	Title	Producer(s)	Featured guest(s)	Length
1.	"Intro"			1:21
2.	"BaKardi Slang"	Solitair		4:33
3.	"Mic T.H.U.G.S."	Kardinal Offishall (co-produced by Solitair and Tara Chase)		3:50
4.	"Husslin'"	Kardinal Offishall (co-produced by Solitair and Tara Chase)		3:45
5.	"Ol' Time Killin'"	Mr. Attic	Jully Black, Allistair, IRS, and Wio-K	4:39
6.	"Money Jane" (Remix)	Kardinal Offishall	Sean Paul and Jully Black	6:56
7.	"Man by Choice"	Kardinal Offishall (co-produced by Solitair and Tara Chase)		4:39
8.	"Maxine"	Yaadmaneverywhere!		4:58
9.	"U R Ghetto 2002"	Kardinal Offishall (co-produced by Solitair and Tara Chase)		4:24
10.	"Quest for Fire"	Kardinal Offishall (co-produced by Solitair and Tara Chase)	Solitair	3:59
11.	"Powerfulll"	Kardinal Offishall (co-produced by Solitair and Tara Chase)	Jully Black and Tara Chase	5:59
12.	"G Walkin'"	Kardinal Offishall (co-produced by Solitair and Tara Chase)	Glenn Lewis	4:35
13.	"Gotta Get It"	Saukrates	Saukrates	4:25
14.	"On wid da Show"	Kardinal Offishall (co-produced by Solitair and Tara Chase)		4:39
15.	"Go Ahead Den"	Kardinal Offishall (co-produced by Solitair and Tara Chase)		3:58

== Samples ==
- "Mic T.H.U.G.S." contains a sample from "Eazy-Duz-It" by Eazy-E
- "Ol' Time Killin'" contains samples from "The MC" by KRS-One, "Murderer" by Barrington Levy and "Murder She Wrote" by Chaka Demus & Pliers
- "Money Jane" (Remix) contains elements from "Jam on It" by Newcleus
- "U R Ghetto 2002" contains elements from "Les Modernes" by Mark Isham
- "Go Ahead Den" contains elements from "100% Dundee" by The Roots

== Chart positions ==
Chart (2001)	Peak position
U.S. Billboard Top R&B/Hip-Hop Albums	57

== Personnel ==
- Kardinal Offishall – producer
- Glenn Lewis – performer
- Sean Paul – performer
- Saukrates – producer
- Chris "The Glove" Taylor – mixing

== Release history ==
Region	Date
Canada	April 10, 2001
United States	May 22, 2001
