= Husslin' (song) =

Single by Kardinal Offishall

from the album Husslin'
- A-side: "Mic T.H.U.G.S."
- Released: 2000
- Recorded: 1999
- Genre: Canadian hip hop
- Length: 3:45
- Label: Fat Beats; Figure IV
- Songwriter: J. Harrow
- Producer: Kardinal Offishall

Kardinal Offishall singles chronology
"And What?" (1999)	"Husslin'" (2000)	"Money Jane" (2000)

"Husslin'" is a hip-hop song by Kardinal Offishall. It was the only single from his EP of the same name. The song also appears on his second album, Quest for Fire: Firestarter, Vol. 1. Released in early 2000, the 12" single quickly became an underground favorite, and it was #1 on many college radio charts in the U.S. After its release, radio-tracking publication Gavin Report called it "By far, the hottest 12-inch on the platter right now. With three cuts to choose from, you can't go wrong." The song has a catchy chorus and a powerful horn sample.

== Music video ==
The music video was directed by Kevin De Freitas. In the video, Kardinal raps in the streets of Downtown Toronto alongside members of The Circle.

== Track listing ==
=== 12" single ===
A-side

1. "Mic T.H.U.G.S." (Clean)
2. "Mic T.H.U.G.S." (Dirty)
3. "Mic T.H.U.G.S." (Instrumental)
4. "U R Ghetto When" (Clean)

B-side

1. "Husslin'" (Clean)
2. "Husslin'" (Instrumental)
3. "U R Ghetto When" (Dirty)
4. "U R Ghetto When" (Instrumental)

== Chart positions ==
Chart (2000)	Peak position
Canadian The Record Singles Chart	41
Hot Canadian Digital Singles	14
