= Naughty Dread =

Single by Kardinal Offishall

from the album Rap Essentials Volume One
- B-side: "On wid da Show"
- Released: 1996
- Recorded: 1996
- Genre: Canadian hip hop
- Length: 4:27
- Label: Knee Deep Records
- Songwriter: J. Harrow
- Producer: Kardinal Offishall

Kardinal Offishall singles chronology
"Naughty Dread" (1996)	"On wit da Show" (1997)

"Naughty Dread" is a hip-hop song by Kardinal Offishall. It is his debut single, released in 1996 on Knee Deep Records, before being featured on the Rap Essentials Volume One compilation album. The song contains a sample of "Natty Dread" by Bob Marley & The Wailers. It earned him a Juno Award nomination for Best Rap Recording in 1997.

== Background ==
Kardinal wrote the song during a high school class. He recalled, "I came up with it one day when I was in class. The teacher was talking and I wasn't hearing anything. All I was feeling was, 'I have this song to write'." Kardinal recorded the song later that day.

The song blends dancehall with hip-hop, and at the time, it didn't sound like anything else. It received airplay at Canadian campus radio stations, as well as some in the US. In December 1996, Kardinal signed a publishing deal with Warner/Chappell Music Canada, after one of the company's creative managers heard the song.

== Track listing ==
=== 12" single ===
A-side

1. "Naughty Dread" (Eglinton West Clean Mix)
2. "Naughty Dread" (Eglinton West Mix)
3. "Naughty Dread" (Eglinton West Instrumental)

B-side

1. "On wid da Show" (Clean Mix) (featuring Saukrates, Jaden, and Mali)
2. "On wid da Show" (Instrumental)
3. "Naughty Dread" (Remix) (featuring Marvel and Ms. Nici)
