= Black Jays =

Record label

- Founded: 2000
- Founder: Kardinal Offishall; Solitair
- Genre: Hip-Hop; R&B; Reggae
- Country of origin: Canada
- Location: Toronto, Ontario

Black Jays is a Canadian independent record label, production company, and musical collective, specializing in hip-hop, R&B, and reggae music. Founded in 2000 by rappers Kardinal Offishall and Solitair, it was originally known as Silver House and the Girl (S.H.A.G.). In 2004, the group came to prominence after releasing a remix album and mixtape. The Toronto-based group's name is derived from the Toronto Blue Jays baseball team.

== History ==
Kardinal Offishall and Solitair are members of The Circle, a hip-hop collective which was formed in the 1990s. In 2000, they founded the S.H.A.G. production company. The next year, the company's logo and credits appeared on Kardinal's major-label debut, Quest for Fire: Firestarter, Vol. 1. In 2004, now known as the Black Jays, Kardinal and Solitair produced The Black Jays Album, a remixed version of The Black Album by Jay-Z. The New York Times reviewed the album, stating that the production team "links minimalism to reggae."

Later that year, the Black Jays released a mixtape entitled Kill Bloodclott Bill. Led by Kardinal, the mixtape was aimed at major labels, "Bill", as a result of Kardinal's label problems with MCA Records in 2003. "Bang Bang", a song from the mixtape, was nominated for a Juno Award in 2005. Kill Bloodclott Bill featured new artists on the group's roster, including Ro Dolla (a member of The Circle), Lindo P, and Mayhem Morearty. Solitair also released a mixtape in 2004, entitled The Return of the Silver Surfer.

In 2005, Mayhem left the group and recorded a diss track over Kardinal's song "Husslin'". A year later, Kardinal responded to the diss track when he released a remix of "City Is Mine" by Drake. Additionally, in 2005, Kardinal released his third album, Fire and Glory, on Black Jays through a co-venture with Virgin Music Canada. Kardinal produced three songs for his 2008 album, Not 4 Sale, under the Black Jays label.

=== Black Jays International ===
In 2007, a division of Black Jays, known as Black Jays International, was created. Members include Estelle, Cipha Sounds, Black Chiney, Nina Sky, and Nottz.

== Roster ==
=== Artists ===
- Kardinal Offishall
- Solitair
- Estelle
- Nina Sky

=== DJs and producers ===
- Cipha Sounds
- Black Chiney
- Nottz

== Discography ==
=== Albums ===
- Quest for Fire: Firestarter, Vol. 1 (2001)
- Fire and Glory (2005)
- Not 4 Sale (2008)

=== Remix albums ===
- The Black Jays Album (2004)

=== Mixtapes ===
- Kill Bloodclott Bill (2004)

== See also ==
- List of record labels
