= Belly Dancer (Kardinal Offishall song) =

Single by Kardinal Offishall featuring Pharrell Williams
- B-side: "Sick!"
- Released: March 25, 2003
- Recorded: 2002
- Genre: Hip-hop; dancehall
- Length: 3:34
- Label: MCA
- Songwriters: Jason Harrow; Pharrell Williams; Charles Hugo
- Producer: The Neptunes

Kardinal Offishall singles chronology
"Ol' Time Killin'" (2001)	"Belly Dancer" (2003)	"Sick!" (2003)

Pharrell Williams singles chronology
"Excuse Me Miss" (2003)	"Belly Dancer" (2003)	"Frontin'" (2003)

"Belly Dancer" is a song by Canadian rapper Kardinal Offishall featuring Pharrell Williams, who produced it with Chad Hugo as The Neptunes. Released on March 25, 2003, it was originally the first single from the former's unreleased album, Firestarter Vol. 2: The F-Word Theory.

== Background ==
The song was inspired by Naomi Campbell, who was in the studio while the song was recorded. The single briefly appeared on the Billboard charts, and a music video was shot by Little X on May 7, 2003, in Toronto. However, the video remains unreleased, because Kardinal's label at the time, MCA Records, was absorbed into Geffen Records, leaving the single without promotion.

In an interview, Kardinal stated that he does not like the song, and "it was the first thing I did that wasn't from the heart."

== Track listing ==
=== 12" single ===
A-side

1. "Belly Dancer" (Radio Edit) (featuring Pharrell Williams)
2. "Belly Dancer" (Instrumental)

B-side

1. "Belly Dancer" (Album) (featuring Pharrell Williams)
2. "Sick!" (Album) (featuring Bounty Killer)
3. "Sick!" (Instrumental)

== Chart positions ==
Chart (2003)	Peak position
U.S. Billboard Hot R&B/Hip-Hop Songs	96
