= Solitair =

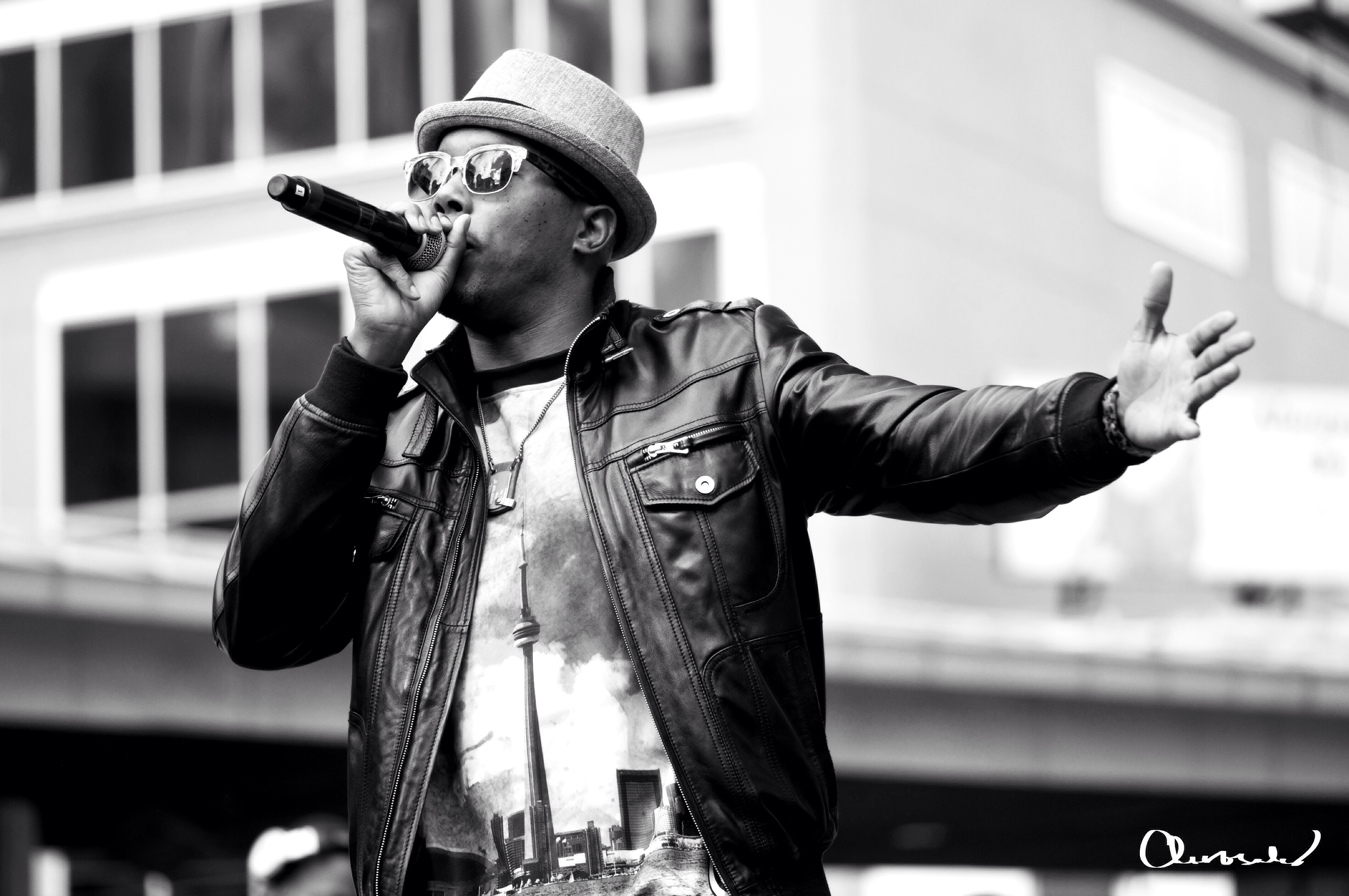
- Solitair, September 2013

Background information
- Also known as: Soli, Silver
- Born: Sheldon Pitt; November 9, 1975 (age 50)
- Origin: Toronto, Ontario, Canada
- Genres: Hip hop, Contemporary R&B, Pop music
- Occupations: Rapper, songwriter, record producer
- Instruments: Vocals, keyboard, sampler, Pro Tools, Logic Pro, FL Studio
- Years active: 1994–present
- Website: solitairmusic.com

Sheldon Pitt, better known by his stage name Solitair, is a Canadian rapper and record producer from Toronto, Ontario. He is a founding member of the now defunct Black Jays record label and production team. Solitair has been producing hip hop and R&B for nearly 20 years, and has produced for Nina Sky, Glenn Lewis, Cham, Maestro, Rascalz, Kardinal Offishall, Ivana Santilli, Jully Black, Choclair, and Sugar Jones among others.

In the late 1990s, Solitair was part of a hip-hop collective known as "The Circle". In 1998, he released his first 12" single, "Silver Surfer". Early in his career, Solitair and fellow rapper Kardinal Offishall founded a production company called "Silver House and the Girl" (S.H.A.G.) in 2000. As a duo, the pair mainly produced for various hip-hop and R&B artists on the local Canadian music scene. Solitair's first internationally successful production was Kardinal's single "BaKardi Slang" from the album Quest for Fire: Firestarter, Vol. 1 released in 2001. Also in 2001, Solitair released a video for his single "Easy 2 Slip”, which was nominated for a MuchMusic Video Award in 2002 for Best Independent Video* and for Best Rap Recording at the 2002 Juno Awards

By 2004, Solitair and Kardinal renamed their label Black Jays. Solitair and Kardinal produced a remixed version of Jay-Z's The Black Album and called it The Black Jays Album. When Kardinal created the mixtape Kill Bloodcott Bill, featuring guest appearances by rappers and dancehall deejays, Solitair produced the title track “Kill Bill” as well as being featured as a rapper on several other tracks. Solitair was also commissioned along with rapper Ro Dolla to produce the intro for basketball highlights sports program NBA XL, on Rogers Sportsnet.

In 2006, Solitair began to collaborate with Cipha Sounds of Hot 97. The songs they produced together were created under the production name “More Fire”. Throughout the course of their partnership, the duo has produced for artists such as Nina Sky, Daytona (rapper), Lil Wayne, Busta Rhymes, Dj Khaled, Jim Jones, Elephant Man, and Trey Songz.

Solitair volunteers to speak to at-risk students at high schools in Toronto. He also teaches audio production part time at Toronto Metropolitan University.
