= Choclair =

- Also known as: Chox, Chiznock, Blake Savage
- Born: Kareem Blake; March 27, 1975 (age 51); Scarborough, Ontario, Canada
- Origin: Toronto, Ontario, Canada
- Genres: Canadian hip hop
- Occupation: Rapper
- Years active: 1995–present
- Labels: Knee Deep Records, Virgin Records, Priority Records, Greenhouse Music
- Website: Official Website

Kareem Blake (born March 27, 1975), better known by his stage name Choclair, is a Canadian rapper. He was one of the most successful rappers in Canada in the late 1990s and early 2000s. Choclair has been nominated for six Juno Awards, winning four.

== Career ==
Blake, of Jamaican descent, was born in Scarborough, Ontario, in east Toronto. Starting at the age of 11, he followed in his older brother's footsteps, and decided to become a rapper. Blake attended St. John Paul II Catholic Secondary School, which is when he first started performing under the name "Choclair". In 1995, he released his debut single, "Twenty One Years", on his own independent label, Knee Deep Records. In 1997, he released the EP What It Takes, which was accompanied by a music video featuring Jully Black. What It Takes won the "Best Rap Recording" award at the 1997 Juno Awards. By 1998, Choclair had released eleven records, including the first international releases for Saukrates, Kardinal Offishall, Jully Black, Solitair, Marvel, and Tara Chase from Toronto's music scene.

Choclair, with the Rascalz, contributed to the hip hop song "Northern Touch", which received two Juno Awards and a MuchMusic Video Award, and achieved lasting popularity among Canadian hip hop fans and has been labelled by critics as a "hiphop anthem".

Choclair then expanded his team and joined Virgin Music Canada in July 1998. In 1999, he signed with Priority Records, and released his debut album Ice Cold, produced by Saukrates. The album was certified gold in Canada (50,000 copies) and spawned the hit single "Let's Ride", produced by Kardinal Offishall. Let's Ride reached #31 in Canada on the BDS radio chart.

Ice Cold won the Juno award for "Best Rap Recording" in 2000. He was stated saying "It wasn't just hip-hop artists that inspired me, I used to like to see those old rock groups perform in front of a whole bunch of people in their '80s videos too - it was the whole music and entertainment combination that I was hooked on." (Western Gazette, November 15th 2000)

Later that year, "Let's Ride" won a SOCAN award and a MuchMusic award. He was presented with a 2001 Urban Music award from SOCAN. Also in 2001 he opened the Music Without Borders concert at the Air Canada Centre in Toronto.

On March 5, 2002, Choclair released his next album, Memoirs of Blake Savage, which included a lot of drug-related lyrics. He released the single "Skunk" from that album, which featured Kurupt of Tha Dogg Pound.

After parting ways with Virgin Music, Choclair started his own independent label Greenhouse Music in partnership with Sextant Records/EMI Music Canada. On June 17, 2003, he released the album Flagrant, which won a Juno Award as best rap recording in 2004. He also released other Canadian hip hop albums in conjunction with Sextant Records and EMI. Greenhouse followed that with the release of My Demo, a collection of Choclair's early underground recordings.

In 2006, Choclair released the album, Flagship. He was also featured on Karl Wolf's single, "Desensitize".

In 2018, Choclair and other members of the team who recorded "Northern Touch" performed the song at the 2018 Juno Awards ceremony. Also in 2018, Choclair joined Classified and Maestro Fresh-Wes on the "Canadian Classic Tour".

== Legacy ==
In Fall 2023, Hart House featured Choclair on a curated list of 50 of the most influential figures of the Toronto Hip Hop scene (between the years 1980-2000), dubbing the project and subsequent gallery exhibition 'The First 50: Toronto’s Hip Hop Architects'.

== Returning To Music ==
On November 28th 2025 Choclair stepped back into the spotlight, releasing his first full-length album in 20 years, Transit Music. The album has 14 songs and features artists like KXNG Crooked. The album is rooted in classic hip hop production with a refined artistic focus. Celebrated in the community, Street Voices has stated "This release feels personal and cultural at the same time. It is not just about an album dropping. It is about a legend returning. It is about giving flowers while celebrating a city that has always moved with grit, creativity, and community at its core. Transit Music is for the ones who watched Toronto hip-hop rise from the ground up. It is for the new generation shaping the sound today. And it is for the city that raised him, inspired him, and still stands with him."

== Discography ==
=== Albums ===
- Ice Cold (1999)
- Memoirs of Blake Savage (2002)
- Flagrant (2003)
- My Demo (2003)
- Flagship (2006)
- Transit Music (2025)

=== EPs ===
- What It Takes (1997)

=== Singles ===
- "Twenty One Years"
- "What It Takes"
- "So I" (Frankenstein featuring Choclair)
- "Internal Affairs"
- "Flagrant"
- "Let's Ride"
- "Rubbin'"
- "Light It Up"
- "Skunk"
- "Who Dat Is (Chiznock Pt. II)"
- "Skyline"
- "Tell 'Em"
- "Desensitize" (Karl Wolf featuring Choclair)
- "Weekend" (Karl Wolf featuring Choclair)
- "Sunshine (These Are the Days)"
- "The Essence"
- "Made (Move Mountains)"
- "T-Dot"
- "Hurt Everybody" (with Classified)
- "Good Vibes" (Count Klassy featuring Choclair)
