= Kardinal Offishall =

Canadian rapper (born 1976)

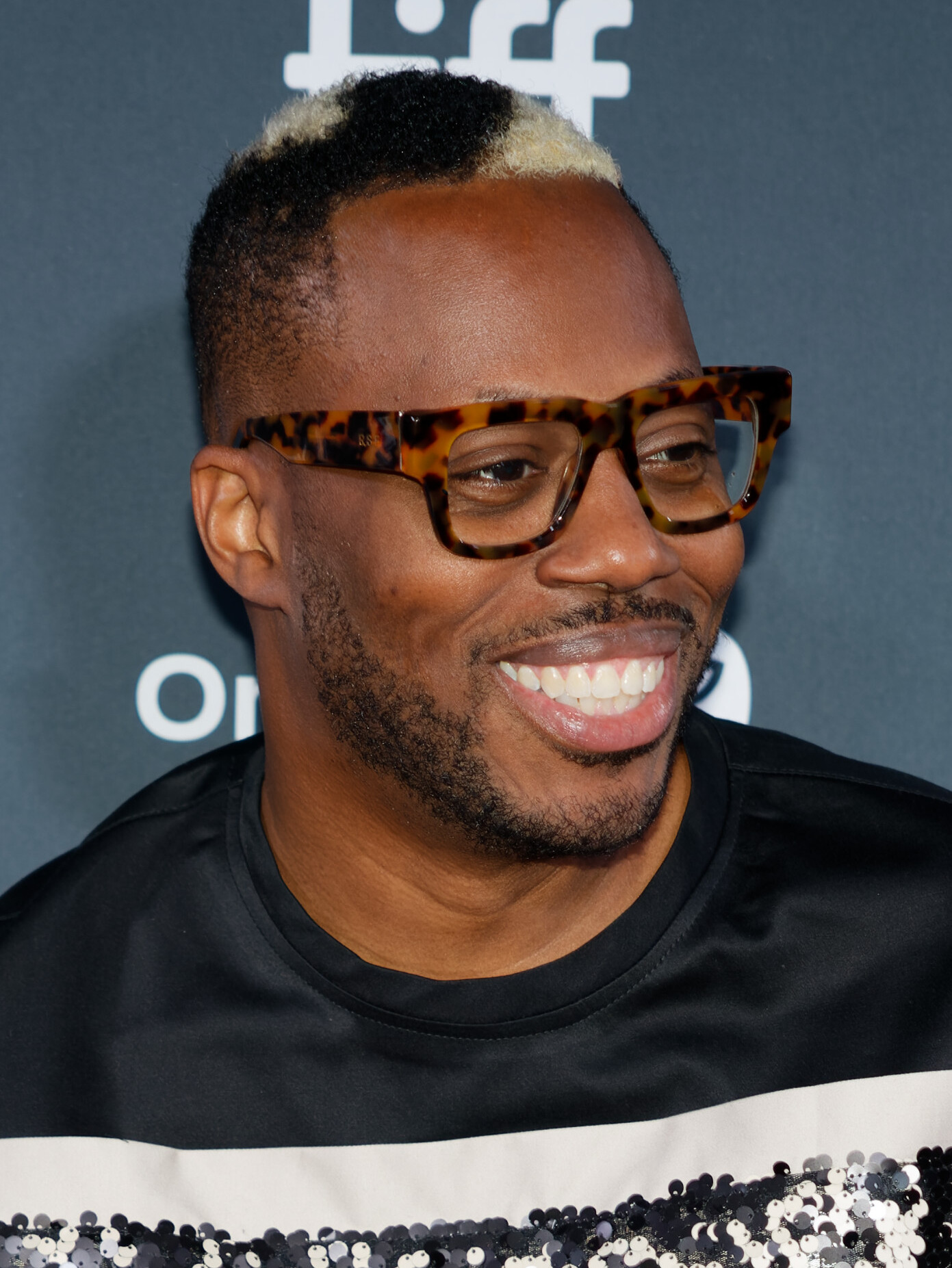
- Offishall at the 2024 Toronto International Film Festival

Background information
- Born: Jason Drew Harrow; May 11, 1976 (age 50); Toronto, Ontario, Canada
- Genres: Canadian hip-hop; dancehall
- Occupations: Rapper; songwriter; record producer; disc jockey; music executive
- Instrument: Vocals
- Years active: 1994–present
- Works: Discography; production
- Labels: In Our Dreams; Universal Music Canada; Kon Live; Geffen; M3; Virgin; EMI Music Canada; MCA; Figure IV; Black Stone Colleagues; Capitol Hill; Knee Deep
- Producer(s): Akon; Clinton Sparks; Nottz
- Member of: Artists Against Bullying; Black Jays
- Children: 3
- Website: mrkardinal.com

Jason Drew Harrow (born May 11, 1976), better known by his stage name Kardinal Offishall (/kɑːrdɪˈnæl oʊfɪˈʃæl/ kardi-NAL ohfi-SHAL), is a Canadian rapper and record producer. Often credited as Canada's "hip-hop ambassador", he has been regarded as one of the country's most prominent hip-hop producers during the 2000s and is distinctive for his reggae and dancehall-influenced style of hip-hop.

A native of Toronto, Ontario, Harrow began his career in the city's mid-1990s underground hip-hop scene, when he formed the hip-hop group the Circle. He released his debut studio album, Eye & I (1997) and extended play (EP), Husslin' (2000) independently before signing with MCA Records in 2000. His second album and major label debut, Quest for Fire: Firestarter, Vol. 1 (2001), moderately entered the Canadian Albums Chart and was supported by his first Canadian Singles Chart entries: "Ol' Time Killin'" and "BaKardi Slang"—the latter of which popularized Toronto's nickname "T-dot". He failed to release the album's sequel on MCA, in part due to the label's absorption by Geffen Records prior to its release. Harrow's third album, Fire and Glory (2003), was released by Virgin Records; despite widespread critical praise, it was met with commercial stagnation and became his only release with the label.

He then signed with Senegalese-American singer Akon's record label KonLive Distribution, an imprint of Geffen Records in 2007 to release his fourth album, Not 4 Sale (2008). Its lead single, "Dangerous" (featuring Akon) peaked at number two on the then-newly established Canadian Hot 100, number five of the US Billboard Hot 100, and received quadruple platinum certification by Music Canada (MC). The song yielded his furthest commercial success, and was followed by his guest performance alongside Colby O'Donis on Akon's single "Beautiful" that same year, which peaked within the top 20 of the latter chart. Not 4 Sale debuted at number eight on the Canadian Albums Chart, number 40 on the Billboard 200, and spawned the Canadian Hot 100-top 40 single "Numba 1 (Tide Is High)" (remix versions featuring Keri Hilson/Rihanna/Nicole Scherzinger), which received gold certification by MC. His 2010 single, "Body Bounce" (featuring Akon), peaked within the top 20 of the chart and received platinum certification, although he parted ways with KonLive later that year.

An independent artist once more, he formed the record label Black Stone Colleagues shortly after, although in 2013, Harrow was named the creative executive director of Universal Music Canada's A&R division. Two years later, he released his fifth album, Kardi Gras, Vol. 1: The Clash (2015) to moderate success. In April 2021, he was promoted to senior vice-president of A&R for Universal Music Canada.

== Biography ==
=== Early life and career beginnings ===
Harrow was born in the Scarborough district of Toronto, Ontario, and raised by Jamaican immigrant parents. From the ages of 2 to 13, he lived in the city's Flemingdon Park neighbourhood. He moved back to Scarborough for two years, before finally settling in Oakwood–Vaughan, in the city's west end. While in high school, he would throw parties at the Alexandra Park Community Centre. He also is a former York University student (Philosophy) but did not complete his degree.

He started rapping at the age of eight and was winning competitions by the time he was 12. At age 14, he performed live on stage for the first time, with Nelson Mandela in attendance during Mandela's first visit to Toronto following his release from prison earlier that year (1990). By 1993, he decided to change his alias "KoolAid", and went by the moniker "Kardinal Offishall" after being inspired by the great 17th century French politician Cardinal Richelieu. That year, Offishall co-founded the Circle, a collective of artists including Choclair, Jully Black, Solitair, Tara Chase, and Saukrates. In 1994, he made his first recorded appearance on Saukrates' single "Still Caught Up".

=== 1996–1999: Eye & I ===
Kardinal was signed to a publishing deal with Warner/Chappell Music Canada at the age of 20. In 1996, he released his first single "Naughty Dread", which was featured on the Rap Essentials Volume One compilation and earned him a Juno Award nomination for Best Rap Recording. In 1997, Kardinal released his debut album Eye & I on Capitol Hill Music. The only single from the album, "On wit da Show", had considerable video play on MuchMusic. The album received rave reviews from music critics. AllMusic stated that Kardinal "blended soul, dancehall, reggae, hip-hop, and a wholly inventive approach to beats on his 20-track debut album, Eye & I." Unfortunately, the album was poorly distributed in Canada, and a lack of radio support resulted in the album receiving limited commercial attention. Over 4,000 copies of the album were sold in its first three months of release. In 1998, he was featured on the Juno-winning single "Northern Touch" with the Rascalz, Choclair, Checkmate and Thrust. The following year, he produced Choclair's hit single "Let's Ride".

=== 2000–2003: Husslin' and Quest for Fire: Firestarter, Vol. 1 ===
Husslin' was an EP released on April 11, 2000. It was released independently on Figure IV Entertainment and distributed by Fat Beats Records in the United States. The title track, "Husslin'", was one of the hottest 12" singles of 2000. "And What?", featuring Saukrates, was released as a single in 1999. "Husslin'" and "Mic T.H.U.G.S." also appear on Kardinal's second studio album, Quest for Fire: Firestarter, Vol. 1. An updated version of "U R Ghetto When", known as "U R Ghetto 2002", is on the Quest for Fire album. In 2000, Kardinal signed with MCA Records. He released the album Quest for Fire: Firestarter, Vol. 1 in 2001, which spawned the hits "BaKardi Slang" and "Ol' Time Killin'".One year after its release, 25,000 copies of the album were sold in Canada. It received generally favorable reviews from music critics. The Source gave the album 3 1/2 out of 5 mics. RapReviews.com gave it a 7/10 rating, calling it a "mixed bag," and stating "there are also some perfect 10's to be found here." The A.V. Club gave the album a favorable review, praising its "impressive musical and lyrical consistency." AllMusic gave it 2 1/2 out of 5 stars, noting that Kardinal "displays only flashes of promise here." The album was nominated for Best Rap Recording at the 2002 Juno Awards.

After MCA folded in 2003, Kardinal's highly anticipated follow up album Firestarter Vol. 2: The F-Word Theory was shelved along with the music video for the single "Belly Dancer" featuring Pharrell, and Kardinal eventually found himself without a label. Had the album been released, there would have been production from Timbaland and the Neptunes, among others.

For the 20th anniversary of Quest for Fire: Firestarter, Vol. 1, Kardinal released "Firestarter", a capsule clothing collection in collaboration with urbancoolab, an artificial intelligence fashion platform.

=== 2004–2008: Fire and Glory and Not 4 Sale ===
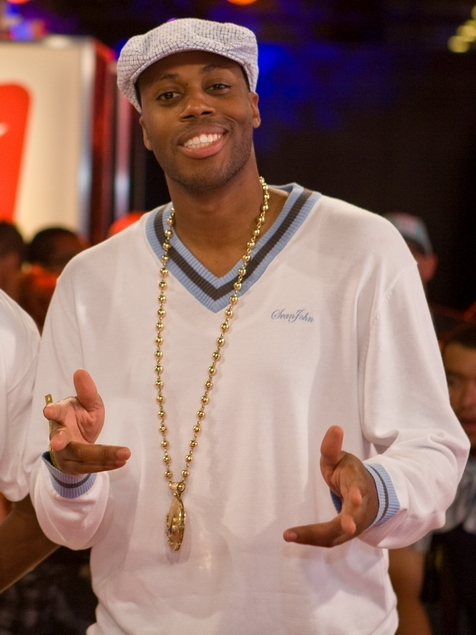
Offishall at the eTalk Festival Party, during the Toronto International Film Festival in 2008.

In 2004, Kardinal released an independent mixtape titled Kill Bloodclott Bill with his production company, Black Jays, and he also released his second major-label album titled Fire and Glory on November 15, 2005, through Virgin Records in Canada only. Hits on Fire and Glory include "Everyday (Rudebwoy)" and "Heads Up". RapReviews.com gave the album an 8.5/10 rating, stating "Fire and Glory is a better album than Firestarter Vol. 1," and "aside from having better lyrics than most of his counterparts, Kardinal's unique style also sets him apart." The album was nominated for Rap Recording of the Year at the 2006 Juno Awards.

Not 4 Sale is the fourth studio album by Canadian rapper Kardinal Offishall, released September 9, 2008, on Kon Live/Geffen Records. It is his second international major-label album, after 2001's Quest for Fire: Firestarter, Vol. 1. It was a critical success, spawning the top 5 Billboard Hot 100 single "Dangerous", and the minor hit "Numba 1 (Tide Is High)". 11,869 copies of the album were sold in the United States, in its first week of release. It debuted on the Billboard 200 at number 40. As of February 15, 2009, the album has sold 34,822 copies. In Canada, it debuted at number 8 on the Canadian Albums Chart, with 4,247 copies sold in the first week. The album received generally favorable reviews from music critics. AllMusic gave it 4 out of 5 stars, calling it "an entirely solid album", also stating "this freedom fighting and socially conscious writing is tempered with hooky club tracks that never fail."[14] USA Today gave it 3 out of 4 stars, noting "his potent blend of hip-hop and dancehall gives him a flavor all his own."PopMatters gave the album a 6/10 rating, writing "although many of the tracks here are glossy pop productions, Kardinal has not really changed since he was first heard in the '90s."The album won the award for Rap Recording of the Year at the 2009 Juno Awards.

=== 2009–2018: Universal Music Canada partnership and Kardi Gras, Vol. 1: The Clash ===
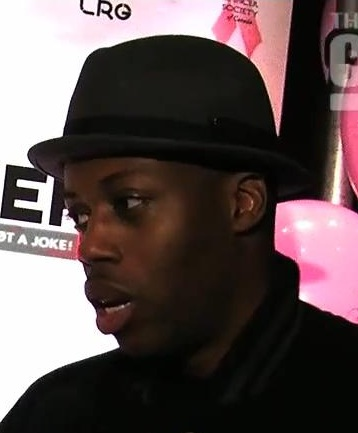
Offishall in 2010

In 2008, he was featured on the Just Dance (RedOne Remix) by Lady Gaga, part of the EP "Just Dance (Remixes, Pt. 2)". In 2010, he was included in the Young Artists for Haiti's version of "Wavin' Flag" in an effort to raise money for disaster relief. He starred along with many Canadian stars. Also in 2010, he was featured in Raghav's single "So Much". In 2011, he collaborated with Canadian dance-pop act Audio Playground on their gold selling single "Famous", which reached #28 in Canada and #10 on the USA Billboard Dance charts. In 2011, he collaborated with singer Karl Wolf on his single "Ghetto Love".

In 2013, Kardinal Offishall, along with Madchild from Swollen Members, were featured on Canadian hip-hop artist Classified's self-titled album on the track "Look Up". He also appeared on the charity single "True Colors" by Artists Against Bullying. On December 16, 2013, Offishall joined Universal Music Canada as Creative Executive Director of A&R. Aside from developing Canadian talent, he has also expressed interest in developing international talent, stating "I'm searching the world for superstars." On October 30, 2015, Kardinal Offishall released his fifth studio album Kardi Gras, Vol. 1: The Clash which spawned the hit single "That Chick Right There", which reached number 68 on the Canadian Hot 100.

=== 2019–present: New music and Canada's Got Talent ===
On June 4, 2019, Kardinal Offishall released the single "Run", which was used as the Toronto Raptors theme song during their championship run in the 2019 NBA Finals and also announced as the first single for a planned album Pick Your Poison, which ultimately got scrapped.

In October 2021, it was announced that he would be a judge on the second season of Canada's Got Talent, which aired in 2022. He also made a guest appearance as a fictionalized version of himself in the debut episode of the CBC Television sitcom Run the Burbs.

In 2026, Kardinal Offishall officially announced the release of his sixth album Firestarter Vol. 2: Everyday, Sometimes… which will be released on September 25th, the album serves as the sequel to his second album on its 25th anniversary.

== Personal life ==
=== Family ===
Kardinal Offishall is married to Tashi Harrow. The couple have three children, two sons and a daughter.

=== Philanthropy ===
As a philanthropist, Harrow has hosted the KARDI Christmas Party charity event since 2000, which raises funds for community initiatives and causes. He is a founding member of the music business collective non-profit, Advance. During his tenure at Universal Music Canada, he established the B.L.A.C.K. (Businesses Levelling Access to Change and Knowledge) Label Coalition, which secures funds for various charities.

== Discography ==
Studio albums

- Eye & I (1997)
- Quest for Fire: Firestarter, Vol. 1 (2001)
- Fire and Glory (2005)
- Not 4 Sale (2008)
- Kardi Gras, Vol. 1: The Clash (2015)
- Firestarter Vol. 2: Everyday, Sometimes… (2026)

Collaborative albums

- A.M.T.R.I.M. with Nottz (2012)

== Awards ==
- 1999: Juno Award for Rap Recording of the Year for Rascalz' "Northern Touch"
- 2000: Juno Award for Rap Recording of the Year for producing Choclair's "Let's Ride"
- 2000: SOCAN Award for "Husslin'"
- 2001: MuchMusic Video Award – Best Rap Video for "Money Jane"
- 2002: SOCAN Award for "Money Jane"
- 2004: Canadian Urban Music Award for "Empty Barrel"
- 2006: 3 MuchMusic Video Awards – Best Video, Best Director (RT!) and VideoFACT Award for "Everyday (Rudebwoy)"
- 2009: Juno Award for Single of the Year for "Dangerous"; Juno Award for Rap Recording of the Year for Not 4 Sale
- 2009: SOCAN Urban Music Award for "Dangerous"
- 2014: Juno Award for R&B/Soul Recording of the Year for "Can't Choose" (with JRDN)
- 2019: Honorary Degree from Humber Polytechnic College

== Filmography ==
Film
Year	Film	Role	Note
2003	Love, Sex and Eating the Bones	Andre Patterson	
2004	My Baby's Daddy	M.C.	
2011	You Got Served: Beat the World	M.C.	
Television
Year	Show	Role	Note
2000	Drop the Beat	C.K.	
2001	After Hours	—N/a	
2005	Video on Trial	Himself	
2006	Muchmusic VJ Search	Himself	
2016	Private Eyes	Apollo	
2022	Run the Burbs	Himself	
2022–present	Canada's Got Talent	Judge	Season 2–present
Featuring music video
Year	Artist	Song	Note
2002	Sean Paul	Get Busy	
2005	Rihanna	Pon de Replay	

== See also ==
- Canadian hip-hop
- Music of Canada
