= Mule (Orville Peck album) =

Studio album by Orville Peck
- Released: September 18, 2026
- Studio: Neon Cross (Nashville)
- Genres: Country rock; blues
- Length: 37:38
- Label: Warner
- Producer: Jay Joyce

Orville Peck chronology
Appaloosa (2025)	Mule (2026)

Singles from Mule
- 1. "Too Little, Too Late" Released: 24 July 2026; 2. "Already Gone" Released: 14 August 2026

Mule is the fourth studio album by the South African country music singer-songwriter Orville Peck. It was released on 18 September 2026 through Warner and follows Peck's 2024 duets project Stampede. Peck re-teamed with Jay Joyce, who produced his second album Bronco and with previous collaborators Noah Cyrus and Allison Russell, as well with as Emmylou Harris, one of his musical heroes, who all make guest appearances on the album's introductory track "Prologue (Euology of a Man Turned Mule)", which was released alongside lead single "Too Little, Too Late". The album was described by Peck as his most deeply personal to date, and the thirteen tracks, all of which he co-wrote, are a chronological exploration of how he got sober, entered rehab and rebuilt his life following a near-fatal overdose.

== Background ==
The album was officially announced on 24 July 2026 alongside the release of lead single "Too Little, Too Late", and the a cappella opening track "Prologue (Eulogy of a Man Turned Mule)", the latter of which is performed by Emmylou Harris, Noah Cyrus, and Allison Russell. It is Peck's fourth collaboration with Cyrus, following "Love Is a Canyon" from her 2025 album I Want My Loved Ones to Go with Me, and "How Far Will We Take It?" and "Atchafalaya" from Peck's Stampede album and Appaloosa EP, respectively, and his second collaboration with Russell, who also duetted with Peck on Stampede with the song "Chemical Sunset".

Mule was described by Peck as a brutally honest and chronological account of "the most important year of [his] life", during which he broke up with his partner of four years, overdosed and almost died. As he was preparing to begin the headlining tour for his second album Bronco in July 2023, Peck's team found him the morning after his overdose and told him he had to cancel the tour and get help, or they would cut ties with him. Though Peck checked out of rehab after a month and continued to use, he eventually became sober by November 2023 when he was struck by the realization of everything he could lose if he continued his current lifestyle. Throughout his journey with sobriety, Peck determined that his battle with addiction partly stemmed from the pressure of fame and the duality between the real him and the performer he is to the wider world. Of this, Peck explained, "the dilemma I have on this album is not me versus this character that I’ve created, or whatever people think. The dilemma is, I am an incredibly sensitive, hurt person who’s carrying around a lot of shit that I have to work on – and then my job requires me to also navigate thousands of people’s opinions of every single breath I take. That creates a dichotomous life, regardless of if Orville Peck is my birth name." Peck stated that the attempt to reconcile both identities is what gave the album its title, and added that "’Mule’ spoke to me because a mule is part horse, part donkey and they’re sort of bred specifically for working and they’re known for being stubborn. They also have a connotation with drug trafficking … I think that’s funny."

Of the album, Peck stated, "it is a deeply, deeply personal album with a lot of bluegrass influences because I'm a big bluegrass fan. I'm very nervous to put it out there because it's super personal. But I'm also very excited. It's my favorite thing I've ever done".

"Already Gone" was released as the album's second single on 14 August 2026 alongside an accompanying music video. Discussing the song, Peck explained, "‘Already Gone’ lands early in the album’s story, when I first entered the rehab facility. I accepted the decision to seek treatment but deep down I believed I didn’t have a problem. The video reflects my arrogant mindset as I picture the experience as a light-hearted musical, while in reality, I was in total crisis."

== Critical reception ==
On Album of the Year, the album has an average score of 75 out of 100 from nine critic scores. Any Decent Music gave it a weighted average score of 7.1 out of 10 from seven critic scores. According to Metacritic, it received "generally favorable" reviews based on a weighted average score of 80 out of 100 from six critic scores.

== Track listing ==
All lyrics are written by Orville Peck, except where noted.

Mule track listing
No.	Title	Lyrics	Music	Length
1.	"Prologue (Eulogy of a Man Turned Mule)" (with Emmylou Harris, Noah Cyrus, and Allison Russell)		Orville Peck	0:54
2.	"Big Ol' House"		Peck; David Hamelin	2:22
3.	"Already Gone"		Peck; Jacob Portrait	2:49
4.	"Rehab Blues"		Evan Weiss	2:53
5.	"Ring the Bell"		Peck	2:21
6.	"Blue Skies"	Peck; Zhone; Sarah Hudson	Peck; Zhone; Hudson	2:34
7.	"The Fall"		Peck; Dillon Casey	3:59
8.	"Cowboy Heart"		Kyle Connolly	3:10
9.	"The Breeze, the Grass, the Mourning Dove and Me"		Peck; Portrait	3:03
10.	"Run Out of Road"	Peck; John Ryan; Mags Duval	Peck; Ryan; Duval	2:59
11.	"Too Little, Too Late"	Peck; Dan Wilson; Steve Rusch	Peck; Wilson; Rusch	2:52
12.	"War of the Worlds"	Peck; Ryan	Peck; Ryan	3:19
13.	"Mule"		Peck	4:18
Total length:				37:38

== Personnel ==
Credits are adapted from the album's liner notes.

- Orville Peck – arrangement (tracks 1, 7, 13), vocals (2–13), electric guitar (2, 3, 6, 10); finger snaps, percussion (2, 6); tambourine (2, 10), hand claps (3, 11); timpani, maracas (3); kazoo, piano, pump organ, gang vocals, bottle klinks (4); acoustic guitar (5, 8–13), bell (5), creative direction
- Jay Joyce – production, mixing (all tracks); acoustic guitar (2), hand claps (3, 11), Hammond B3 (3), keyboards (6–8, 10, 11), tambourine (10), electric guitar (11)
- Jason Hall – recording, mixing (all tracks); hand claps (3, 11); gang vocals, bottle klinks (4)
- Bobby Louden – engineering assistance (all tracks), hand claps (3, 11); gang vocals, bottle klinks (4)
- Jaxon Hargrove – engineering assistance (all tracks), hand claps (3, 11); gang vocals, bottle klinks (4)
- Adam Grover – mastering
- Court Blankenship – production coordination
- Emmylou Harris – vocals (1)
- Noah Cyrus – vocals (1)
- Allison Russell – vocals (1)
- Kyle Connolly – bass (2–13), hand claps (3, 11); marimbula, bottle klinks, gang vocals (4); arrangement (7), background vocals (8, 9)
- Dillon Casey – Hammond B3 (2, 10, 11), background vocals (3, 6, 8, 9, 12), hand claps (3, 11), electric guitar (3), piano (4, 8, 13); pump organ, toy piano, gang vocals, bottle klinks (4); steel guitar (5–13); acoustic guitar, arrangement (7); glockenspiel (8); Wurlitzer, Roland Juno, keyboards (10)
- Evan Weiss – electric guitar (2, 3, 5–8, 10–13), hand claps (3, 11), acoustic guitar (4, 9); gang vocals, bottle klinks (4); arrangement (7), background vocals (8, 9)
- Kris Bowering – drums (2, 4–12), tambourine (2, 12), shakers (3, 6), hand claps (3, 11); gang vocals, bottle klinks (4); bongo, djembe (6); arrangement, percussion (7); background vocals (8), woodblock (10), bells (12)
- Emily Rose – background vocals (2, 3, 5, 6, 8–12), acoustic guitar (2, 3, 5, 8–12), hand claps (3, 11); resonator, gang vocals, bottle klinks (4); Hammond B3, Roland Juno (6)
- Ry Jennings – mandolin (2, 3, 8, 9, 13); train whistle, gang vocals, bottle klinks (4)
- Molly Tuttle – banjo (2, 3, 8, 9, 13), acoustic guitar (12)
- Ketch Secor – fiddle (3, 8, 9, 13)
- Kyle Carper – hand claps (3)
- Jackson Quiggins – jaw harp, banjo, gang vocals, bottle klinks (4)
- Emily Nenni – gang vocals, bottle klinks (4)
- Alexia Noelle Paris – gang vocals, bottle klinks (4)
- Matt Combs – cello, violin, viola (7)
- Max Woolery – hand claps (11)
- Jonny Shorr – arrangement (13)
- Hailey Rucobo – art direction, design
- Gordon Nicholas – album photography

== Charts ==
Chart performance for Mule
Chart (2026)	Peak position
Australian Albums (ARIA)	49
Australian Country Albums (ARIA)	8
French Physical Albums (SNEP)	55
Hungarian Physical Albums (MAHASZ)	17
Hungarian Vinyl Albums (MAHASZ)	9
Scottish Albums (Official Charts)	11
UK Albums (Official Charts)	90
UK Country Albums (Official Charts)	1
US Billboard 200	134
US Americana/Folk Albums (Billboard)	9
US Top Country Albums (Billboard)	19
