= Friends of Dorothy (song) =

2025 song by the Wiggles

Song by the Wiggles

from the album Wiggle Up, Giddy Up
- Released: March 6, 2025
- Genre: Country, Children's
- Length: 2:49
- Songwriters: Anthony Field, Lachlan Gillespie and Zane Powell
- Producer: Anthony Field

"Friends of Dorothy" is a country song by Australian children's musicians The Wiggles with singer Orville Peck on the Wiggles' album Wiggle Up, Giddy Up. The song gained widespread notoriety for using the titular phrase, which historically was a slang term for a gay man as a pun in reference to Wiggles character Dorothy the Dinosaur.

== Background ==
The phrase "friends of Dorothy" had a history of being an indirect way of referring to someone as a queer individual, with its origins commonly thought to come from The Wizard of Oz (1939) character Dorothy Gale, played in the movie by, Judy Garland who had been identified as a gay icon, though other sources suggested it was a reference to Algonquin Round Table founding member Dorothy Parker. Member Anthony Field recounted that when The Wiggles began touring in the United States, people would approach them and ask if they were friends of Dorothy based on the Wiggles featuring a character named Dorothy the Dinosaur. Field said that he would agree that they were, unaware of the euphemism.

== Composition ==
Field had the idea to write the song upon learning the history of the term and collaborated with Orville Peck, who was already out as gay, approaching him about it via a Zoom meeting, and Peck was reportedly happy to participate. As Gay City News noted, Peck was not the only singer the Wiggles worked with on the album who was popular among the queer community, as two other tracks were collaborations with Dolly Parton and a cover of Chappell Roan's song "Pink Pony Club".

The song uses slang which is commonly associated with the LGBTQ community, such as "What's the tea?" and "fierce". Although it did not contain overtly queer themes, the song was immediately identified as a reference to the queer community and its language.

== Reception ==
Them referred to the song as "one of the most celebratory, LGBTQ+-coded songs for kids in modern history". Out responded similarly, referring to the song as a statement of the band's support for the queer community. When asked by The Guardian if the song was the Wiggles' first gay anthem, Field responded that it could be understood that way or in other ways as long as the audience enjoyed listening to it.

The song quickly gained popularity after it released, having gotten over 500,000 views on Facebook in less than week after its release with comments across social media supporting the song. It was described as being one of the most talked-about on the album by Gay City News, saying that it was playful and affectionate in its acknowledgement of the queer community. Agreeing on the tone of the song, Star Observer described it as "cheeky" and "camp", having enjoyed the comedy of the song.
