= 2019 Polaris Music Prize =

Canadian music award

- Country: Canada
- Winner(s): Haviah Mighty, 13th Floor
- Website: polarismusicprize.ca

The 2019 edition of the Canadian Polaris Music Prize was presented on September 16, 2019. Haviah Mighty won the $50,000 prize for her debut album 13th Floor, becoming the first Black woman and first hip hop artist to win the prize.

== Gala ==
The 2019 Polaris Music Prize Gala was hosted at The Carlu and had performances from nine of the ten shortlisted artists, with the exception of Jessie Reyez, who did not perform due to injury. The winner was announced by the previous year's winner, Jeremy Dutcher.

=== Performances ===
Artist(s)	Song(s)
PUP	"Kids" "Free At Last" "Full Blown Meltdown"
Marie Davidson	"Work It"
Shad	"The Fool Pt. 1" "Magic" featuring Lido Pimienta
Elisapie	"Darkness Bring the Light" "Amaq"
Haviah Mighty	Medley of songs from 13th Floor
Les Louanges	"La nuit est une panthère" "Tercel"
Dominique Fils-Aimé	"Gun Burial" "Free Dom"
Fet.Nat	"Trust Cops (medley)"
Snotty Nose Rez Kids	"Wa'wais (medley)"

== Shortlist ==
The shortlist was announced on July 16 with an afternoon special hosted by Raina Douris on the CBC Music radio network, which revealed one album per half hour and featured musical selections from and discussion with music critics about each album.

- Haviah Mighty, 13th Floor
- Marie Davidson, Working Class Woman
- Elisapie, The Ballad of the Runaway Girl
- FET.NAT, Le Mal
- Dominique Fils-Aimé, Stay Tuned!
- Les Louanges, La nuit est une panthère
- PUP, Morbid Stuff
- Jessie Reyez, Being Human in Public
- Shad, A Short Story About a War
- Snotty Nose Rez Kids, Trapline

== Longlist ==
The prize's preliminary 40-album longlist was announced on June 20.

- Tim Baker, Forever Overhead
- Tanika Charles, The Gumption
- Clairmont the Second, Do You Drive?
- Charlotte Cornfield, The Shape of Your Name
- Marie Davidson, Working Class Woman
- Dilly Dally, Heaven
- The Dirty Nil, Master Volume
- Dizzy, Baby Teeth
- Elisapie, The Ballad of the Runaway Girl
- FET.NAT, Le Mal
- Dominique Fils-Aimé, Stay Tuned!
- Fucked Up, Dose Your Dreams
- Yves Jarvis, The Same but by Different Means
- Carly Rae Jepsen, Dedicated
- Kaia Kater, Grenades
- Kimmortal, X Marks the Swirl
- La Force, La Force
- LAL, Dark Beings
- Laurence-Anne, Première apparition
- Salomé Leclerc, Les choses extérieures
- Lee Harvey Osmond, Mohawk
- Jean Leloup, L'étrange pays
- Shay Lia, Dangerous
- Les Louanges, La nuit est une panthère
- Loud, Tout ça pour ça
- Shawn Mendes, Shawn Mendes
- Haviah Mighty, 13th Floor
- Operators, Radiant Dawn
- Orville Peck, Pony
- Sandro Perri, In Another Life
- PUP, Morbid Stuff
- Lee Reed, The Steal City EP
- Jessie Reyez, Being Human in Public
- Shad, A Short Story About a War
- Snotty Nose Rez Kids, Trapline
- Alexandra Stréliski, Inscape
- Sydanie, 999
- Tobi, Still
- Voivod, The Wake
- Wintersleep, In the Land Of

== Heritage Prize ==
Nominees for the Polaris Heritage Prize, a separate award to honour classic Canadian albums released before the creation of the Polaris Prize, were announced at the main Polaris gala, and the winners were announced on November 4. Unlike in prior years, when four shortlists were released for each of four distinct historical eras in Canadian music, in 2019 only a single shortlist, comprising 12 albums from across the entire history of Canadian music, was named; those 12 albums were submitted to a public vote, while the jury was able to select an album from outside the public shortlist.

- Public: D.O.A, Hardcore '81
- Jury: Oscar Peterson, Night Train
- The Band, Music from Big Pink
- Robert Charlebois and Louise Forestier, Lindberg
- Sarah Harmer, You Were Here
- k.d. lang, Ingenue
- Maestro Fresh Wes, Symphony in Effect
- Main Source, Breaking Atoms
- Sarah McLachlan, Fumbling Towards Ecstasy
- Joni Mitchell, Court and Spark
- Stan Rogers, Fogarty's Cove
- Buffy Sainte-Marie, It's My Way!
- The Weakerthans, Left and Leaving
