= Obuxum =

Somalian-Canadian electronic music producer

OBUXUM is the stage name of Muxubo Mohamed, a Somali-Canadian electronic music producer. She is most noted for her album Re-Birth, which was longlisted for the 2020 Polaris Music Prize.

She debuted with the EP H.E.R. in 2018. Re-Birth, her full-length debut, was released in 2019.

She produced the song "In Women Colour" from Haviah Mighty's 2019 album 13th Floor.

== Discography ==
=== Albums ===
- Re-Birth (2019)

=== EPs ===
- H.E.R (2018)
