= Appaloosa (EP) =

2025 extended play (EP) by Orville Peck

EP by Orville Peck
- Released: November 14, 2025
- Length: 25:01
- Label: Warner
- Producers: Orville Peck; Jacob Portrait

Orville Peck chronology
Stampede (2024)	Appaloosa (2025)	Mule (2026)

Singles from Appaloosa
- 1. "Drift Away" Released: November 2, 2025

Appaloosa is an extended play (EP) by Orville Peck, released on November 14, 2025, via Warner Records.

== Composition ==
Noah Cyrus is featured on "Atchafalaya", marking the second collaboration between Cyrus and Peck following "How Far Will We Take It?" from Peck's 2024 album Stampede. "Maybe This Time" is a performance of the song from the musical Cabaret, the 2025 revival of which Peck performed in as The Emcee for several weeks on Broadway.

== Track listing ==
Appaloosa track listing
No.	Title	Writer(s)	Length
1.	"Dreaded Sundown"	Orville Peck; Jackson Morgan; Jacob Portrait	3:23
2.	"Drift Away"	Peck; Dillon Casey; Kyle Connolly; Danny Presant	3:25
3.	"Atchafalaya" (featuring Noah Cyrus)	Peck; Grant Averill; Noah Cyrus; Portrait; Joe Spargur	3:46
4.	"Maybe This Time"	Fred Ebb; John Kander	3:59
5.	"Oh My Days"	Peck	3:33
6.	"My Side of the Mountain"	Peck; Nick Long	3:21
7.	"It's the End of the World"	Peck; Averill; Spargur	3:34
Total length:			25:01

== Personnel ==
Credits adapted from Tidal.

=== Musicians ===
- Orville Peck – lead vocals (all tracks), background vocals (tracks 1–3, 5, 6), electric guitar (2, 5, 6), acoustic guitar (2, 5), percussion (6)
- Dillon Casey – pedal steel guitar (all tracks), electric guitar (1–3, 5–7), baritone guitar (1–3, 7), acoustic guitar (1, 2, 4, 6), piano (2, 3), Rhodes piano (2, 5)
- Mike Robinson – pedal steel guitar (all tracks), steel guitar (1–3), banjo (3, 6), mandolin (3)
- Kyle Connolly – bass (1–5, 7)
- Kris Bowering – drums (1, 3–5), guitar (1, 7), percussion (1, 2, 5)
- Bobby Hawk – fiddle (1–3, 5), strings (5, 7)
- Jacob Portrait – cymbals (1, 3), drums (1, 3), drum machine (1), timpani (3, 7), electric guitar (5), autoharp (7)
- Jon Nellen – drums (2, 3, 7)
- Dylan Day – acoustic guitar, slide guitar (3)
- Christian Li – piano (3, 7); Juno synthesizer, synthesizer (3)
- Noah Cyrus – vocals (3)
- Karl Skyler Urban – background vocals (5, 6)
- Grant Averill – background vocals, bass, guitar, keyboards (7)
- Joe London – guitar, keyboards, programming (7)

=== Technical ===
- Jacob Portrait – production, engineering (all tracks); mixing (4)
- Orville Peck – production
- Joe London – production, vocal production, engineering (7)
- Grant Averill – additional production (7)
- Carter Nyhan – engineering
- Pete Mintz – additional engineering (2), vocal engineering (3, 6)
- Andrew Lappin – mixing (1–3, 5–7)
- Heba Kadry – mastering

== Charts ==
Chart performance for Appaloosa
Chart (2025)	Peak position
Australian Country Albums (ARIA)	39
UK Album Downloads (Official Charts)	22
UK Americana Albums (Official Charts)	28
