= Lost Highway (Willie Nelson album) =

Compilation album by Willie Nelson
- Released: August 11, 2009
- Genre: Country
- Length: 62:02
- Label: Lost Highway
- Producer: Willie Nelson, Ryan Adams, Chips Moman, James Stroud

Willie Nelson chronology
Naked Willie (2009)	Lost Highway (2009)	The Classic Christmas Album (2012)

Professional ratings
Review scores
Source	Rating
AllMusic	2.5/5 stars

Lost Highway is a compilation album by country artist Willie Nelson. It was released on August 11, 2009.

== Track listing ==
1. "Maria (Shut Up and Kiss Me)" (Rob Thomas) – 4:20
  - with Rob Thomas
2. "Mendocino County Line" (Matt Serletic, Bernie Taupin) – 4:32
  - with Lee Ann Womack
3. "Back to Earth" (Willie Nelson) – 2:58
4. "The Harder They Come" (Jimmy Cliff) – 3:38
5. "Over You Again" (Willie Nelson, Micah Nelson, Lukas Nelson) – 5:35
6. "You Don't Know Me" (Eddy Arnold, Cindy Walker) – 3:40
7. "Lost Highway" (Leon Payne) – 2:52
  - with Ray Price
8. "Beer for My Horses" (Scotty Emerick, Toby Keith) – 3:30
  - with Toby Keith
9. "Blue Eyes Crying in the Rain" (Fred Rose) – 2:58
  - with Shania Twain
10. "Overtime" (Lucinda Williams) – 3:44
  - with Lucinda Williams
11. "I'm Still Not Over You" (Willie Nelson) – 3:59
  - with Ray Price
12. "Superman" (Willie Nelson) – 2:12
13. "Bubbles in My Beer" (Tommy Duncan, Cindy Walker, Bob Wills) – 2:48
14. "Crazy" (Willie Nelson) – 4:37
  - with Diana Krall and Elvis Costello
15. "Both Sides of Goodbye" (Jackson Leap, Kim Williams) – 4:18
16. "Cowboys Are Frequently, Secretly Fond of Each Other" (Ned Sublette) – 3:33
17. "Ain't Goin' Down on Brokeback Mountain" (Ben Hayslip, Brandon Kinney, Wynn Varble) – 2:53

== Chart performance ==
Chart (2009)	Peak position
U.S. Billboard Top Country Albums	29
U.S. Billboard Top 200	173

== Personnel ==
- Willie Nelson - Guitar, vocals
