= Bronco (Orville Peck album) =

Studio album by Orville Peck
- Released: April 8, 2022
- Genres: Country rock; country; outlaw country; alt-country
- Length: 53:40
- Label: Columbia
- Producer: Jay Joyce

Orville Peck chronology
Show Pony (2020)	Bronco (2022)	Stampede (2024)

Bronco is the second studio album by South African singer-songwriter Orville Peck, released on April 8, 2022, by Columbia Records. It was nominated for Country Album of the Year at the Juno Awards of 2023 and was longlisted for the 2022 Polaris Music Prize.

== Background and promotion ==
In 2019, Orville Peck released his debut studio album Pony to critical acclaim. He followed it up with the EP Show Pony (2020), intended as a bridge between his first and second albums. On February 7, 2022, Peck dropped a trailer for the album on his YouTube channel announcing the release dates for the album and its first chapter.

In lieu of singles, Peck opted to release the albums in three "chapters", a choice that earned comparison to Beach House's promotional campaign for Once Twice Melody. The first chapter was released on February 11, 2022, and contained the songs "Daytona Sand", "Outta Time", "C'mon Baby Cry", and "Any Turn". "C'Mon Baby Cry" was accompanied by a video featuring cameos from comedian Margaret Cho and drag queen Kornbread Jeté. A video for "Daytona Sand" was released on March 5, 2022. A second chapter was released March 11, 2022, containing the songs "The Curse of the Blackened Eye", "Kalahari Down", "Trample Out the Days", and "Hexie Mountains". "The Curse of the Blackened Eye" was accompanied by a music video featuring The Walking Dead actor Norman Reedus. The music video for "Hexie Mountains" was released on March 24, 2022, featuring Peck's close friend Riley Keough.

Peck promoted the album with the Bronco Tour across North America and Oceania throughout 2022.

== Composition ==
Bronco is a country rock, country, outlaw country, and alt-country album with elements of psychedelic rock, rockabilly, soft rock, psychedelia, bluegrass, doo-wop, and countrypolitan.

When discussing the sound of the album, Peck noted the influence of 60s and 70s psychedelic rock, specifically mentioning bands Jefferson Airplane, The Mamas & the Papas, Pink Floyd and Syd Barrett and South African folk artists Miriam Makeba and Hugh Masekela alongside the "flower child" country influences of Gram Parsons, Emmylou Harris, Merle Haggard and Willie Nelson.

== Critical reception ==
Professional ratings
Aggregate scores
Source	Rating
Metacritic	81/100
Review scores
Source	Rating
AllMusic	4/5 stars
DIY	4/5 stars
Dork	4/5 stars
Exclaim!	7/10
Gigwise	7/10 stars
The Line of Best Fit	9/10
MusicOMH	4/5 stars
NME	4/5 stars
Pitchfork	6.8/10
Sputnikmusic	5/5

At Metacritic, which assigns a normalized rating out of 100 to reviews from mainstream critics, Bronco received an average score of 81, based on nine reviews, indicating "universal acclaim".

Mark Deming of AllMusic commended Peck's lyricism, saying "He has no trouble writing songs that have the dramatic sweep his Roy Orbison meets Morrissey voice demands, and as a lyricist, he's an effective storyteller who doesn't shy away from a dollop of melodrama while still making his characters ring true. The artfully woven queer subtext of Pony is present and accounted for, while the universality of his lonely cowboy's mingled desires for independence and companionship will make this speak to all sorts of listeners."

NME writer Harry West praised Peck's musical growth, saying that "all 15 tracks feel sonically muscular and more mature than those of its predecessor" and called it "wholly modern and proudly queer".

Elly Watson of DIY opined that Bronco, "flits between theatricality and poignancy, almost every song sounding like it could score a Western's pivotal moment with ease."

Gigwise contributor Miles Cooke wrote that "With this bold, brash and liberated second album full of love and loss, cowboy romanticism, California sorrow and candid homosexuality, the enigmatic desperado continues his rise with a greater confidence and warmth than before. Though a touch sappy in places and musically underwhelming in others, Bronco is overall another triumph for Orville Peck."

Pitchfork's Stephen Thomas Erlewine praised the album's production but criticized Peck's vocals, saying "The emphasis on the rhinestone icon inevitably highlights Bronco's one failing: The album would be better if Peck could actually sing. Peck may be a master vocalizer capable of wringing maximum ardor out of a song, but he alternates between a portentous mumble and a throaty bellow, the kind of histrionics that were once the speciality of Elvis impersonators."

By contrast, Sputnikmusic contributor Matthias praised his voice, opining "Primarily a stunningly low baritone with a penchant for a pretty falsetto, Peck is now making full use of his range, with belting, riffs, and that perfect falsetto appearing in song after song, with fifteen songs of fifty minutes of that voice arguably being not enough."

Dork contributor Steven Loftin said that Peck is "able to convey with the simplest touch a wealth of feeling as if he's reaching deep inside your heart and it's you he's bringing to life, but as easily as he does this, he leaves you in the cold of night wanting more."

The album received a Juno Award nomination for Country Album of the Year at the Juno Awards of 2023.

== Track listing ==
Bronco track listing
No.	Title	Writer(s)	Length
1.	"Daytona Sand"	Orville Peck	3:15
2.	"The Curse of the Blackened Eye"	Peck; Chris Stracey; Tobias Jesso Jr.	4:10
3.	"Outta Time"	Peck; Kyle Connolly	4:18
4.	"Lafayette"	Peck	3:02
5.	"C'mon Baby, Cry"	Peck; Jesso; Stracey	3:30
6.	"Iris Rose"	Peck	2:48
7.	"Kalahari Down"	Peck	4:49
8.	"Bronco"	Peck	3:28
9.	"Trample Out the Days"	Peck	3:48
10.	"Blush"	Peck	3:36
11.	"Hexie Mountains"	Peck	3:11
12.	"Let Me Drown"	Peck	3:19
13.	"Any Turn"	Peck	2:16
14.	"City of Gold"	Peck	4:04
15.	"All I Can Say"	Peck; Duncan Jay Hennings; Bria Salmena	3:56
Total length:			53:40

== Personnel ==
=== Musicians ===
- Orville Peck – vocals, electric guitar (tracks 1, 7, 8), acoustic guitar (tracks 1, 3–4, 6, 9–10, 13–15), percussion (tracks 1–2, 5, 8, 13, 15), mandolin (track 2), piano (track 2), celesta (track 5), harmonica (track 7), keyboards (track 11–12)
- Kris Bowering – drums (tracks 1–3, 6–10, 12, 13, 15), percussion (tracks 6–9, 11, 13)
- Emmanuel Echem – trumpet (track 6)
- Laura Epling – violin (tracks 7, 12)
- Duncan Jay Hennings – electric guitar (tracks 1–13, 15), keyboards (tracks 2–3), organ (tracks 7, 10, 15), piano (15)
- Tobias Jesso Jr. – acoustic guitar (track 5)
- Jay Joyce – keyboards (tracks 1–8, 10, 13), electric guitar (tracks 2, 5, 11), omnichord (track 2), percussion (track 3), programming (track 5)
- Austin Hoke – cello (tracks 7, 12)
- Jordan Lehning – string arrangement (tracks 7, 12)
- Nicole Neely – viola (tracks 7, 12)
- Kyle Connolly – bass (tracks 1–13, 15)
- Noam Pikelny – banjo (tracks 6, 11)
- Bria Salmena – background vocals (tracks 1–10, 12), electric guitar (tracks 1–4, 6, 8–10, 13, 15), acoustic guitar (tracks 7, 9), keyboards (track 11), featured vocals (track 15)
- Luke Schneider – steel guitar (tracks 2–3, 5, 7, 8, 14, 15)
- Chris Stracey – organ (track 5)
- Kristin Weber – violin (tracks 7, 12)

=== Technical ===
- Jason Hall – mixing engineer, recording engineer (tracks 1–5, 7–9, 11–15)
- Jaxon Hargrove – assistant engineer
- Jay Joyce – mixing engineer
- Jimmy Mansfield – assistant engineer
- Andrew Mendelson – mastering engineer (tracks 1–13, 15), assistant engineer (track 7)
- Pete Min – recording engineer (track 5)
- Chris Stracey – recording engineer (track 5)

== Charts ==
Chart performance for Bronco
Chart (2022)	Peak position
Scottish Albums (Official Charts)	22
UK Americana Albums (Official Charts)	3
UK Country Albums (Official Charts)	2
UK Album Downloads (Official Charts)	18
US Billboard 200	80
US Top Country Albums (Billboard)	11
US Americana/Folk Albums (Billboard)	4
US Top Rock Albums (Billboard)	13
