= Show Pony =

EP by Orville Peck
- Released: August 14, 2020
- Recorded: 2020
- Studio: Shania Twain's Las Vegas ranch ("Legends Never Die")
- Genre: Country; alternative country; cowboy pop
- Length: 25:15
- Label: Columbia
- Producer: Orville Peck; Dallas Austin; Eric Zayne; Austin Jenkins; Carlos Santolalla

Orville Peck chronology
Pony (2019)	Show Pony (2020)	Bronco (2022)

Singles from Show Pony
- 1. "Summertime" Released: April 1, 2020

Show Pony is the first extended play by South African country music artist Orville Peck, and a companion to his debut studio album Pony. Announced by Peck as a bridge between Pony and the next full-length album, it was released on August 14, 2020 by Columbia Records, making his debut major-label release. It received positive reviews from critics.

== Recording and release ==
Initially scheduled for release on June 12, 2020, the extended play was put out by Columbia and Sub Pop the following August 14, to allow more public attention to the George Floyd protests. The release was preceded by a music video for "Legends Never Die", a duet starring fellow Canadian country pop vocalist Shania Twain, as well as by videos for singles "No Glory in the West" and "Summertime".

Peck recorded the songs as a follow-up to his 2019 debut Pony and was inspired by the work of Neil Young and Crazy Horse. He arranged the duet with Twain after the two met at an awards show in 2020 and recorded the song immediately before quarantining due to the COVID-19 pandemic, with the duo working on the song at Twain's ranch. In addition to the themes of a rough and hot American Southwest, Peck viewed this release as a bridge between Pony and his next full-length project, re-recording "Summertime" from Pony-era sessions for this EP.

Peck and Twain recorded a live-to-tape performance of "Legends Never Die" for The Tonight Show with Jimmy Fallon to promote the release.

== Critical reception ==
Professional ratings
Aggregate scores
Source	Rating
Metacritic	79/100
Review scores
Source	Rating
Exclaim!	9/10
The Line of Best Fit	8/10
NME	4/5
Pitchfork Media	6.7/10
Spectrum Culture	64%
Sputnikmusic	4.5/5

According to the review aggregator Metacritic, Show Pony received "generally favorable reviews" based on a weighted average score of 79 out of 100 from five critic scores.. Aggregator Album of the Year summed up critical consensus as an 88 out of 100, based on seven reviews. The A.V. Club staff listed this as one of five noteworthy releases of the week, with writer Cameron Scheetz saying, "Orville Peck's vocal muscle really shines through, staking out a place of his own among the legends that inspired him". Leonie Cooper of NME gave the album four out of five stars for Peck's diversity as a performer, with the "razzle-dazzle" of "Legends Never Die" and more somber and pensive tracks. Allie Gregory's review in Exclaim! was even more effusive, writing that the album solidifies Peck's place as one of country's greats, scoring it a nine out of ten. Similarly, Ross Horton of The Line of Best Fit gave the album an eight out of 10 for pushing the boundaries of country music, writing that Peck is on a "one-man mission to take country out farther into the wilderness that its ever been". Pitchfork Media's Cat Zhang gave a more mixed review, awarding a 6.7 out of 10 and praising the playfulness and depth of Peck's lyrics but noting that his stage persona is too shallow. Daniel Bromfield of Spectrum Culture summed up his review with a 64% and noting that the Peck persona is too flimsy: "his music still preoccupies itself with cowboy bombast rather than the wit, personality and day-to-day poetry that defines the best country music... The man behind the Peck project is beginning to emerge, but he remains more interesting as a myth."

== Sales chart performance ==
Show Pony appeared on several Billboard charts in the United States, reaching 8 on Americana/Folk Albums, 20 Top Album Sales, 46 on Top Country Albums, and 50 on Top Rock Albums.

== Track listing ==
All songs written by Orville Peck, except where noted

1. "Summertime" – 2:57
2. "No Glory in the West" (Duncan Hay Jennings and Orville Peck) – 4:13
3. "Drive Me, Crazy" – 5:18
4. "Kids" – 3:21
5. "Legends Never Die" (Jennings and Peck) – 3:52
6. "Fancy" (Bobbie Gentry) – 5:34

== Personnel ==
Credits adapted from liner notes

- Orville Peck – vocals, acoustic guitar on "Summertime" and "Drive Me, Crazy", drums on "Summertime" and "Drive Me, Crazy", piano on "Drive Me, Crazy", guitar on "Fancy", percussion on "Fancy", production
- Kristopher Bowering – percussion on "Legends Never Die", drums on "Fancy"
- Kyle Connolly – bass guitar on "Summertime", "Drive Me, Crazy", "Kids", "Legends Never Die", and "Fancy"
- Fred Eltringham – drums on "Legends Never Die" and "Fancy", percussion on "Legends Never Die"
- Duncan Hay Jennings – guitar on "Summertime", "Drive Me, Crazy", "Legends Never Die", and "Fancy"; keyboards on "Summertime" and "Drive Me, Crazy"; acoustic guitar on "No Glory in the West"
- Russ Pahl – steel guitar on "Legends Never Die"
- Olle Romo – programming on "Legends Never Die"
- Bria Salmena – background vocals on "Summertime" and "Fancy", acoustic guitar on "Legends Never Die" and "Fancy"
- Luke Schneider – banjo on "Summertime" and "Fancy", steel guitar on "Summertime" and "Fancy"
- Shania Twain – vocals on "Legends Never Die"

Technical personnel

- Dallas Austin – co-production on "Drive Me, Crazy"
- Skyler Chuckry – assistant engineering on "Summertime", "No Glory in the West", and "Fancy"
- Shawn Everett – mixing engineering on "Kids"
- Mike Gnocato – assistant engineering on "Drive Me, Crazy" and "Kids"
- Austin Jenkins – co-production on "Legends Never Die"
- Joe LaPorta – mastering engineering
- Zaq Reynolds – mixing engineering on "Summertime", "No Glory in the West", "Drive Me, Crazy", and "Fancy"; recording engineering on "Summertime", "No Glory in the West", and "Fancy"
- Carlos Santolalla – co-production on "Fancy"
- George Seara – engineering on "Drive Me, Crazy" and "Kids"
- Spike Stent – mixing engineering "Legends Never Die"
- Matt Wolach – assistant engineering on "Legends Never Die"
- Eric Zayne – co-production on "Drive Me, Crazy"

== Charts ==
Chart performance for Show Pony
Chart (2020)	Peak position
UK Americana Albums (OCC)	8
UK Album Downloads (OCC)	17
US Americana/Folk Albums (Billboard)	8
US Top Album Sales (Billboard)	20
US Top Country Albums (Billboard)	47
US Top Rock Albums (Billboard)	50
