= Sydanie =

Canadian hip hop artist

- Birth name: Sydanie Nichol
- Origin: Toronto, Ontario, Canada
- Genres: Hip hop
- Occupation: Rapper
- Years active: 2012–present

Sydanie is a Canadian rapper from Toronto, Ontario. She was highlighted as one of the new faces of Canadian hip hop, specifically in the Toronto music scene, by CBC and The Globe and Mail. Her album, 999, was long-listed for the 2019 Polaris Music Prize.

== Early life ==
Sydanie Nichol was born to Jamaican and Trinidadian parents in the Jane and Finch area of Toronto. She studied media communications at Humber College and has a daughter, Kifaaya.

== Career ==
In 2012, she released her first project, Public Intoxication. Since then, she has toured with Lido Pimienta, she has released several singles, and her most recent album, 999, was long-listed for the Polaris Music Prize. In 2019, she was highlighted as one of the new faces of Canadian hip hop, specifically in the Toronto music scene, by CBC and The Globe and Mail.

Her song "Purple Carousel" was a nominee for the 2021 SOCAN Songwriting Prize. That year, she was also featured on the song "Bubble" by D. W. Waterson.
