= The Sorority (rap group) =

Canadian hip hop group

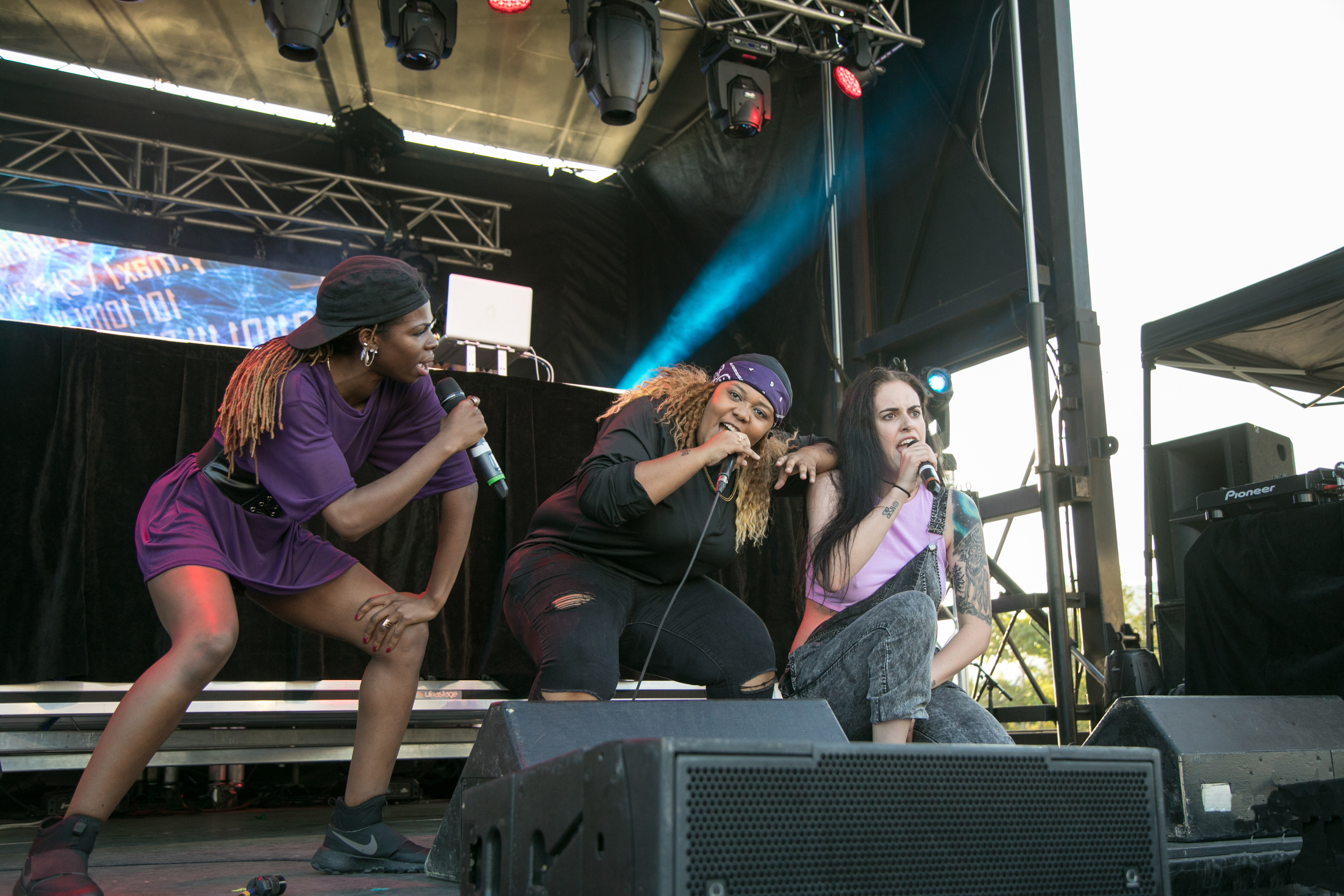
- The Sorority performing in 2017

Background information
- Origin: Toronto, Ontario, Canada
- Genres: Hip hop
- Years active: 2016–2019
- Past members: Keysha Freshh; Lex Leosis; Haviah Mighty; pHoenix Pagliacci

The Sorority was a Canadian hip hop group founded in Toronto in 2016. The group originally comprised Keysha Freshh, Lex Leosis, Haviah Mighty, and pHoenix Pagliacci. They released their debut album, Pledge, in 2018. Pagliacci left the group in early 2019 to focus on her own R&B project, TRP.P, while the remaining members continued touring. The trio disbanded after their final show on November 24, 2019, to focus on their respective solo careers.

In 2019, they were named one of "Canada's Greatest Supergroups" by Exclaim! magazine. They were named one of CBC Music's "10 new Canadian artists who ruled 2018" and were profiled as one of The Globe and Mail's next generation of artists breaking through the Toronto hip hop scene.

== History ==
=== Formation (2016–2017) ===
The group was formed in 2016, after collaborating on a cypher for International Women's Day in association with the online hip hop music platform Team Backpack. The group's cypher subsequently went viral. This was Team Backpack's first all-female cypher.

The original members included four Toronto-area rappers: Keysha Freshh, Lex Leosis, Haviah Mighty, and pHoenix Pagliacci. Later that year, the group released their first single, "Undun", and were named one of NOW Magazine's "Toronto Musicians to Watch" in early 2017. For International Women's Day 2017, The Sorority released "Ladies Night", a tribute to Lil' Kim's 1997 song "Not Tonight". The video for "Ladies Night" featured an all-female production crew and cast and was deemed a "must see" by Complex magazine.

=== Pledge (2018) ===
The first single, "SRTY", from their debut album was released alongside a video on International Woman's Day in 2018, two years after their formation. The song was positively received, with Complex denoting it an "anthem". A second single, "On Me", was released later that month.

Their debut album, titled Pledge, was released on April 13, 2018. The album was premiered on CBC Music's First Play Live, coinciding with an interview that was nationally broadcast on the CBC Radio One program q. The album received favourable reviews, and was named one of CBC Music's "favourite Canadian albums of 2018".

After the album release, the group was featured in Exclaim! and won the Stingray Rising Stars Award—presented by Stingray Music, Women in Music Canada, and Music Ontario—receiving a $2,000 cash prize. The Sorority subsequently embarked on their first North American tour, with dates across Canada and the United States.

=== Final tour and breakup (2019) ===
Pagliacci left the group in early 2019 to focus on her own hip hop project called TRP.P. The remaining members continued touring, however. Later that year, The Sorority announced a national tour with the Snotty Nose Rez Kids and released a new single called "Switch". With five shows remaining in the tour, the group announced that they would be breaking up once it was completed, in order to focus on their respective solo careers. Their final show took place on November 24, 2019, in Toronto.

== Discography ==
Studio albums

- Pledge (2018)

Singles

- "Undun" (2017)
- "SRTY" (2018)
- "On Me" (2018)
- "Switch" (2019)
