= FET.NAT =

Canadian experimental music group

FET.NAT is a Canadian experimental music group from Gatineau, Quebec, whose 2019 album Le Mal was shortlisted for the 2019 Polaris Music Prize.

The band consists of vocalist and lyricist JFNO (Jean-Francois Nault), guitarist Pierre-Luc Clément, saxophonist Linsey Wellman and drummer Olivier Fairfield. Their sound, most commonly categorized as funk-punk, blends aspects of funk and electronic music with avant-garde free jazz.

The band previously released the EPs Brunch (2010), Oh! and fuck allure (2012), Purple Empereur (2014), Poule Mange Poule (2014),Please Stop Saying It's So Beautiful (with Les Coconuts) (2016), and Gaoler (2017).

In March 2020, FET.NAT released its first-ever video, "Your World is my Mystery Gift II", from the Le Mal album.
