= Warsawpack =

Canadian experimental rap rock group

Warsawpack was a Canadian experimental rap rock group based in Hamilton, Ontario. The band's music fuses hip hop, jazz, dub, groove and rock. The band's songs contained mostly politically charged lyrics that critiqued Western consumerism and neo-colonialism.

== History ==
Warsawpack was formed in 1999 by Lee Raback, Scott Rankin, Jaroslav Wassman and Matt Cormier. Rankin later left the band and was replaced by guitarist Ajit Rao, and later members added to the band included tenor saxophonist and flautist Simon Oczkowski, baritone saxophonist Adam Bryant, and turntablist Aaron Sakala, aka DJ Realistic.

Following their debut EP Due to Long Foreseen Events, the band signed to G7 Welcoming Committee Records, which released both of the band's full-length albums. The band released Gross Domestic Product in 2003. Their second full-length album, Stocks and Bombs, appeared on the !earshot National Top 50 Chart in late 2003.

Warsawpack performed as part of Canada Music Week in 2004. In spite of some commercial success, the band broke up later that year.

Raback released his solo debut album Introductory Offer in 2009 under the stage name Lee Reed. He has since followed up with the albums Emergency Broadcast (2011) and The Butcher, the Banker, the Bitumen Tanker (2015), and the EPs Written Large (2013) and The Steal City EP (2018). In June 2019, The Steal City EP was named to the initial longlist for the 2019 Polaris Music Prize.

In 2015, the Warsawpack song "Poorboy Blues" was voted one of the top four songs by a Hamilton band in a CBC Hamilton song contest.

== Discography ==
- Due to Long Foreseen Events (2000)
- Gross Domestic Product (2002)
- Stocks and Bombs (2003)
