= Cowboys Are Frequently, Secretly Fond of Each Other =

Country song covered by Willie Nelson in 2006

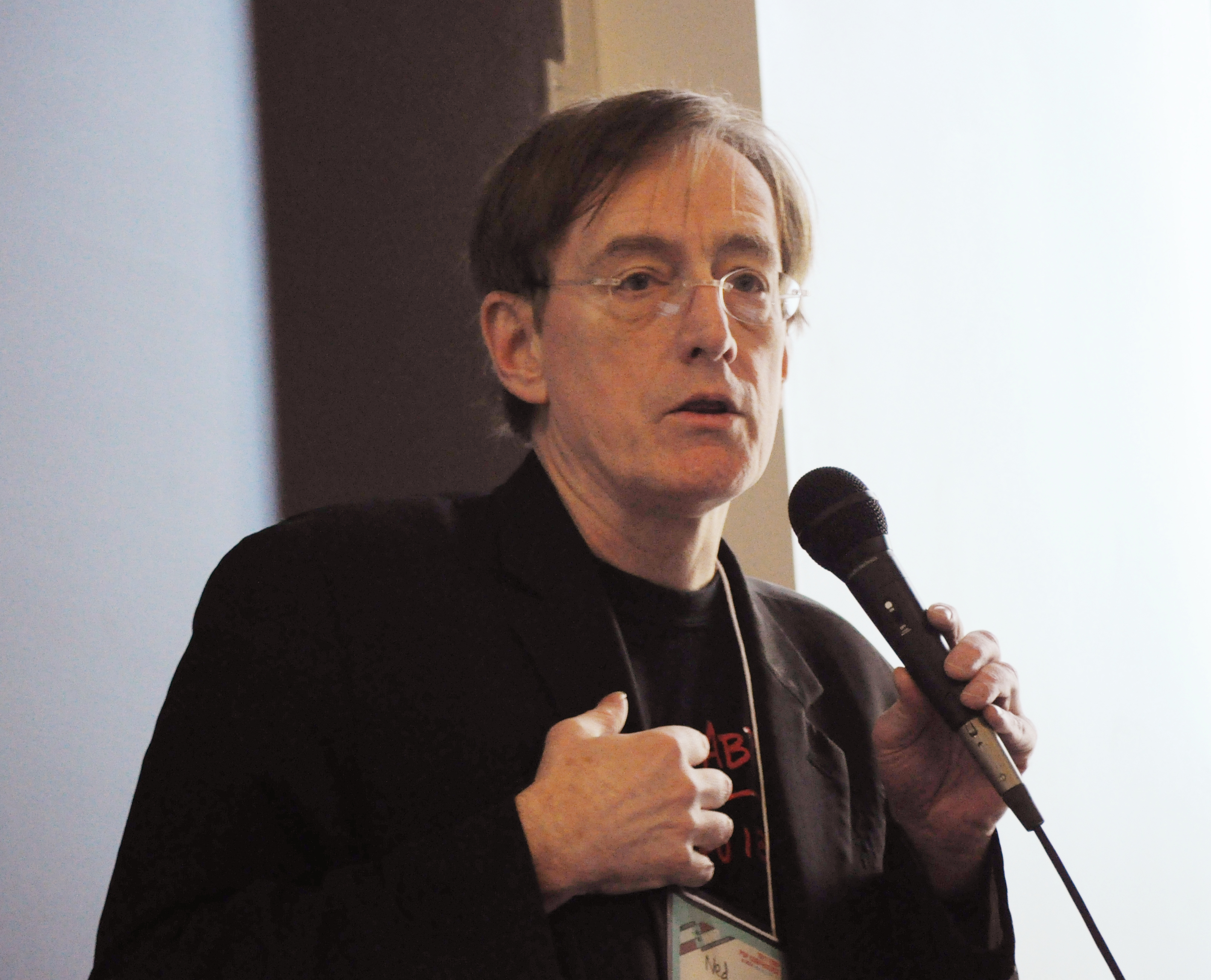
Songwriter Ned Sublette, 2011

"Cowboys Are Frequently, Secretly Fond of Each Other" is a 1981 song by Latin country musician Ned Sublette featuring a "lilting West Texas waltz", widely known as the "gay cowboy song". The song satirizes stereotypes associated with cowboys and gay men, with lyrics relating western wear to the leather subculture: "What did you think all them saddles and boots was about?"

Following Sublette's recording on the 1982 GPS release Life is a Killer, the song was covered by the Canadian alternative country band Lost Dakotas on the 1993 Cargo release Sun Machine, and the queercore band Pansy Division on the 1995 album Pile Up.

The 2006 cover by country musician Willie Nelson was the first gay-themed mainstream country song by a major artist. Orville Peck collaborated with Nelson for a 2024 duet version.

== Original version ==
Sublette stated that the song is based on his experiences growing up in Portales, New Mexico: "I sat down at the piano and ... remembered what it felt like to feel different as a teenager, and the culture at that time, and I started to put those two things together and the song wrote itself". The song was written during the Urban Cowboy fad while living with his wife in Manhattan next to a gay country bar on Christopher Street called Boots and Saddles. He explains, "Gay life in 1981 was very vibrant in those days. It was part of the culture of the city and cowboy imagery is a part of gay iconography." He wrote the song with Nelson's voice in mind: "I was at the beginning of my songwriting career ... and used to like writing songs for my favorite voices. I've been a Willie fan since the '60s."

In 2006, Ann Northrop of Gay USA described the lyrics as "the language of thirty years ago." David Nahmod, however, stated that he felt the lyrics maintain currency and say "a lot about gender identity and heterosexual elitism"; "The song aims to show Mr. Nelson's support for gays, particularly to conservative country-music fans", and suggests that, in addition to other causes, he supports gay rights.

== Willie Nelson's version ==
"Cowboys Are Frequently, Secretly Fond of Each Other"

Single by Willie Nelson
- Released: 14 February 2006
- Recorded: 2005
- Genre: Country
- Label: Lost Highway
- Songwriter: Ned Sublette

Willie Nelson singles chronology
"Beer for My Horses" (2003)	"Cowboys Are Frequently, Secretly Fond of Each Other" (2006)	"Songbird" (2006)

Nelson received a tape of the song from Saturday Night Live Band bassist Tony Garnier after performing on the show in the mid to late 1980s. According to Sublette, "Willie took it from there" though Nelson recently found that demo in a drawer among a stack of his own while recording unreleased songs for iTunes at his Spicewood, Texas, home studio. Nelson says, "I thought it was the funniest goddamn song I'd ever heard. I had it on the bus for 20 years, and people would come in and I'd play it. When Brokeback Mountain come out, it just seemed like a good time to kick it out of the closet."

There were plans to release the song on a future album and filming for the video featuring Broken Lizard Comedy Troupe occurred at Dallas' gay cowboy bar, the Round Up Saloon (in Oak Lawn), in February 2006. Nelson's publicist describes the release of the song, which debuted on Howard Stern's satellite radio show:

Since everyone is talking about the acclaimed film Brokeback Mountain and its Academy Award nominations, Valentine's Day seemed like the right time to let [the song] be heard.

Nelson appeared on the movie's soundtrack with the traditional "He Was a Friend of Mine", which made the US charts at number 54.

Nelson himself described the release in a prepared statement to The Dallas Morning News: "The song's been in the closet for 20 years. The timing's right for it to come out. I'm just opening the door." The song's release was encouraged by the coming out of his friend and tour manager of thirty years, David Anderson, two years prior. Says Anderson:

This song obviously has special meaning to me in more ways than one. I want people to know more than anything—gay, straight, whatever—just how cool Willie is and ... his way of thinking, his tolerance, everything about him.

=== Reception ===
Nelson's version of the song is his highest charting solo single since his 1984 duet with Julio Iglesias, "To All the Girls I've Loved Before" (number 5), debuting at number 52 on the Billboard Hot 100 chart, which Nelson last appeared on with the Toby Keith duet "Beer for My Horses". The song was also well received by critics. Pitchfork Media's Stephen M. Deusner rated the song four out of four stars despite calling it "even more of a stunt than his reggae album" (2005's Countryman). Saying that the song sounds like it was written by Nelson, and that his performance raises the piece above the level of a cheap gag, he felt that it adds "a whole new level of complexity to the outlaw mythology Willie helped to cultivate in the 70s."

Nelson also says that he has received very few negative reactions:

Every now and then somebody might get a little offended. It's got bad language in it, so I just don't do it in my shows. Anybody wants to hear it can hear it on iTunes. But you know people are listenin' to it, likin' it. Every now and then somebody don't like it, but that's okay. Similar to years ago, when the hippie thing come out and I started growin' my hair and puttin' the earring in, I got a little flak here and there.

However, some sources speculate about the potential success and reception of the song. Nelson explains that he didn't think "it took a lot of balls to put the song out", saying, "first of all, I didn't think anybody would play it. I didn't think it would get on the air, but sure enough it did", though not on country stations: "Oh no, they're not gonna play it".

WXBX, a country station in Johnson City, Tennessee, devoted one morning show to a listener discussion of Nelson's release, concluding that "the audience was disappointed in [Nelson]" and, as Nelson thought, that they "probably wouldn't be interested in much airplay". PlanetOut offered the opinion that Nelson's fan base is secure and broad enough (including "hippies, rednecks and outlaws young and old") to take risks with LGBT-themed songs and soundtracks, while the WXBX station manager pointed out that Nelson has not been a mainstream country star for a while. Nelson's broad audience, and part of the appeal of the song, may be that "Willie speaks his mind about any subject ... That's one of those things that has made him so endearing to so many generations of fans".

The song has been described variously as "deadpan", "straight-faced", and "pointedly poignant". Sublette, as expected, approved of Nelson's performance and its potential impact, saying,

It's supposed to be funny, that's what gets people's attention, but to get people to listen to it a second time [you] have to have something going on, and Willie beautifully brought out the tenderness there ... [It's] nice to have a funny song out there—it is challenging people to laugh. Everybody is so angry now.

Sublette speculated about the song's reception:

Willie's smart. We talked about recording it in the '90s but we needed some kind of context. It wouldn't make sense to just put this on some normal Willie album ... The movie provided the context. I don't know if the public is any more or less ready than they were but I think the media is more ready.

The song was featured in a Boondocks comic strip on 27 and 28 February and mentioned until March 2006. According to Sublette, "the Monday and Tuesday strip consisted of my lyrics and dramatizing listeners' response to my lyrics. What a compliment!"

The reception of Nelson's song may be compared to that of Garth Brooks' 1992 single "We Shall Be Free". The song's line, "when we're free to love anyone we choose" caused some radio stations to refuse to play the song, contributing to its peak at number 12 on Billboard's country singles chart and marking the end of Brooks' string of top ten hits. Nelson's song has been lumped together with contemporaneous LGBT-friendly country releases: his and Emmylou Harris's appearance on the Brokeback Mountain soundtrack and Dolly Parton's "Travelin' Thru" appearing on the Transamerica soundtrack, for which she received an Oscar nomination.

When the song appeared as the penultimate track on Nelson's 2009 compilation Lost Highway, it was followed by a previously unreleased version of Willie singing Ben Hayslip's "Ain't Goin' Down on Brokeback Mountain", which includes the lyric "that shit ain't right."

== Orville Peck and Willie Nelson duet (2024) ==
Nelson joined Orville Peck for a duet version of the song in 2024. Released on April 2, the recording was the first single from Peck's third studio album, Stampede (2024).
