= Stampede (Orville Peck album) =

Studio album by Orville Peck
- Released: August 2, 2024
- Genres: Country; alternative country
- Length: 50:30
- Languages: English; Spanish
- Label: Warner
- Producers: Beau Bedford; Dim Star; Orville Peck; Ryan Raines; RMB; Christopher Stracey

Orville Peck chronology
Bronco (2022)	Stampede (2024)	Appaloosa (2025)

Singles from Stampede
- 1. "Cowboys Are Frequently, Secretly Fond of Each Other" Released: April 5, 2024; 2. "Midnight Ride" Released: June 7, 2024

Going into this, I wanted to make sure that every single song on the album felt like a true 50/50 collaboration of me and the other artists' style and sound and genre. I didn't want to just feel like a bunch of Orville Peck songs that feature verses from other artists. I wanted each one to be an actual collaboration. Every single song on the album is entirely its own thing, dependent on who the artist is. It's a really fun journey. It's definitely the most adventurous I've ever been in terms of genre. It's some of the most country songs I've ever done on this album and some of the least country songs I've ever done on this album.

— Peck on recording Stampede: Vol. 1

Stampede is the third studio album by South African singer-songwriter Orville Peck. It was released on August 2, 2024, through Warner. The album follows 2022's Bronco and a self-imposed hiatus in 2023, and was accompanied by a promotional tour as well as the lead single, a cover of "Cowboys Are Frequently, Secretly Fond of Each Other", recorded as a duet with Willie Nelson. The album title continues the theme of Peck's releases having names related to horses, and was preceded by an EP with several songs that span multiple music genres.

== Background ==
Stampede contains 15 tracks, all of which are recorded as vocal duets between Peck and other artists of various genres. Peck recorded a duet version of "Cowboys Are Frequently, Secretly Fond of Each Other" with Willie Nelson, who first covered the song solo in 2006. Peck also covered "Rhinestone Cowboy" and "Saturday Night's Alright (For Fighting)" for the album, with the latter being a duet with its original artist, Elton John. "Midnight Ride", a collaboration with Kylie Minogue and Diplo, was released as the album's second single in June 2024.

Prior to the album, an EP, Stampede: Vol. 1, was released on May 10, 2024. Stephen Daw of Billboard stated that on this release Peck is "a world-class curator paying tribute to the stars who helped pave the way for him". Writing in Slant Magazine, Steve Erickson scored this album 3 out of 5 stars, praising specific tracks but also critiquing that "musically, though, the album isn't always as savvy", with some genre explorations being more successful than others.

== Track listing ==
Stampede track listing
No.	Title	Writer(s)	Duet partner	Length
1.	"Cowboys Are Frequently, Secretly Fond of Each Other"	Ned Sublette	Willie Nelson	3:38
2.	"The Hurtin' Kind"	Orville Peck; Jess Carson; Cameron Duddy; Leland; Ryan Raines; Mark Wystrach	Midland	3:06
3.	"Saturday Night's Alright (For Fighting)"	Elton John; Bernie Taupin	Elton John	4:11
4.	"Back at Your Door"	Peck; Debbii Dawson; Casey Smith; Sammy Witte	Debbii Dawson	3:32
5.	"Chemical Sunset"	Peck; Drew Lindsay; JT Nero; Allison Russell	Allison Russell	2:34
6.	"Death Valley High"	Peck; Beck Hansen; Dan Nakamura	Beck	2:40
7.	"How Far Will We Take It?"	Ben Cramer; Braison Cyrus	Noah Cyrus	2:52
8.	"Miénteme"	Peck; Bu Cuaron; Amiel Gonzales; Tobias Jesso Jr.; Christopher Stracey	Bu Cuaron	3:10
9.	"Papa Was a Rodeo"	Stephin Merritt	Molly Tuttle & Golden Highway	4:19
10.	"Midnight Ride"	Peck; Marta Cikojevic; Kylie Minogue; Stracey	Kylie Minogue; Diplo	3:31
11.	"Ever You're Gone"	Peck; Drew Pearson; Micah Premnath	Teddy Swims	3:52
12.	"You're an Asshole, I Can't Stand You (And I Want a Divorce)"	Margo Price	Margo Price	3:13
13.	"Where Are We Now?"	Peck; Stracey	Mickey Guyton	3:38
14.	"Conquer the Heart"	Nathaniel Rateliff	Nathaniel Rateliff	3:01
15.	"Rhinestone Cowboy"	Larry Weiss	TJ Osborne; Waylon Payne; Fancy Hagood	3:13
Total length:				50:30

== Personnel ==
Musicians

- Orville Peck – vocals on all tracks; banjo on "How Far Will We Take It?"; additional drums on "Conquer the Heart"
- Beau Bedford – acoustic guitar, harmonica, and piano on "Cowboys Are Frequently Secretly Fond of Each Other"
- Ryan Ake – bass and electric guitar on "Cowboys Are Frequently Secretly Fond of Each Other"
- Beck – vocals on "Death Valley High"
- Debbii Dawson – vocals on "Back at Your Door"
- Paul Grass – drums and percussion on "Cowboys Are Frequently Secretly Fond of Each Other"
- Willie Nelson – vocals and gut string guitar on "Cowboys Are Frequently Secretly Fond of Each Other"
- Midland – accompaniment on "The Hurtin' Kind"
  - Jess Carson – electric guitar, vocals
  - Cameron Duddy – bass guitar, vocals
  - Mark Wystrach – guitar, vocals
- Rhys Hastings – drums on "The Hurtin' Kind"
- Will Graefe- Acoustic Guitar, Electric Guitar on “How Far Will We Go”
- Christopher Stracey – Mellotron on "The Hurtin' Kind", "Saturday Night's Alright (For Fighting)", and "Miénteme"; additional guitar on "Saturday Night's Alright (For Fighting)" and "Conquer the Heart"; violin on "Chemical Sunset"; bass and drums on "How Far Will We Take It?" and "Miénteme"; acoustic guitar, baritone guitar, and electric guitar on "How Far Will We Take It?"; guitar and percussion on "Miénteme"
- Matthew Pynn – pedal steel guitar on "The Hurtin' Kind"
- Kyle Connolly – bass on "Saturday Night's Alright (For Fighting)"
- Kane Ritchotte – drums on "Saturday Night's Alright (For Fighting)"
- Cary Singer – guitar on "Saturday Night's Alright (For Fighting)"
- Duncan Hay Jennings – guitar on "Saturday Night's Alright (For Fighting)"
- Benny Bock – piano on "Saturday Night's Alright (For Fighting)"
- Jack Standen – piano on "Saturday Night's Alright (For Fighting)"
- Elton John – vocals on "Saturday Night's Alright (For Fighting)"
- Dan Abu-Absi – acoustic guitar on "Chemical Sunset"
- JT Nero – background vocals on "Chemical Sunset"
- Allison Russell – banjo and vocals on "Chemical Sunset"
- Drew Lindsay – drum programming and piano on "Chemical Sunset"
- Elizabeth Pupo-Walker – percussion on "Chemical Sunset"
- Stewart Cole – trumpet on "Chemical Sunset" and "Miénteme"; baritone horn and valve trombone on "Miénteme"
- Noah Cyrus – vocals on "How Far Will We Take It?"
- Bu Cuarón – vocals on "Miénteme"
- Ethan Jodziewicz – upright bass on "Chemical Sunset"
- Eli Thompson – bass on "Conquer the Heart"
- James Barone – drums and percussion on "Conquer the Heart"
- Nathaniel Rateliff – guitar and vocals on "Conquer That Heart"
- Patrick Meese – keyboards on "Conquer the Heart"
- Hailey Niswanger – tenor saxophone on "Conquer the Heart"
- Molly Tuttle – vocals on "Papa Was a Rodeo"
- Golden Highway – instrumentation on "Papa Was a Rodeo"
- Kylie Minogue – vocals on "Midnight Ride"
- Diplo – instrumentation on "Midnight Ride"
- Teddy Swims – vocals on "Ever You're Gone"
- Margo Price – vocals on "You're an Asshole, I Can't Stand You (and I Want a Divorce)"
- Mickey Guyton – vocals on "Where Are We Now?"
- Nathaniel Rateliff – vocals on "Conquer the Heart"
- TJ Osborne – vocals on "Rhinestone Cowboy"
- Waylon Payne – vocals on ""Rhinestone Cowboy"
- Fancy Hagood – vocals on "Rhinestone Cowboy"

Technical

- Orville Peck – production on all tracks except "Cowboys Are Frequently Secretly Fond of Each Other"
- Christopher Stracey – production on all tracks except "Cowboys Are Frequently Secretly Fond of Each Other"
- Beau Bedford – production on "Cowboys Are Frequently Secretly Fond of Each Other"
- Ryan Raines – production on "The Hurtin' Kind"
- Dim Star – production on "Chemical Sunset"
- RMB – production on "Conquer the Heart"
- Randy Merrill – mastering
- Andrew Lappin – mixing
- Joel Raif – engineering on "Cowboys Are Frequently Secretly Fond of Each Other"
- Dave Poler – engineering on "The Hurtin' Kind"
- Pete Aguilar – engineering on "Saturday Night's Alright (For Fighting)"
- Pete Min – engineering on all tracks except "Cowboys Are Frequently Secretly Fond of Each Other" and "The Hurtin' Kind"; vocal engineering on "Cowboys Are Frequently Secretly Fond of Each Other"
- Brandon Bell – engineering on "Chemical Sunset"
- Daniel Schiwek – engineering on "How Far Will We Take It?"
- Mark Anderson – engineering on "Conquer the Heart"
- Steve Chadie – vocal engineering on "Cowboys Are Frequently Secretly Fond of Each Other"
- Jayk Cherry – mixing assistance

== Charts ==
Chart performance for Stampede
Chart (2024)	Peak position
Australian Country Albums (ARIA)	15
Scottish Albums (Official Charts)	19
UK Album Downloads (Official Charts)	10
UK Country Albums (Official Charts)	1
US Billboard 200	159
US Americana/Folk Albums (Billboard)	18
US Top Country Albums (Billboard)	33

== See also ==
- 2024 in Canadian music
- 2024 in country music
