= TRP.P =

Canadian R&B duo

- Origin: Toronto, Ontario, Canada
- Genres: R&B; Hip hop
- Years active: 2017–present
- Members: Truss; pHoenix Pagliacci

TRP.P (pronounced "trippy") are a Canadian R&B and hip hop duo from Toronto, Ontario. The duo consists of producer Truss and singer-songwriter pHoenix Pagliacci.

The duo released their debut EP, titled TRP.P, in 2017 and their debut album, titled 2TRP.P, in 2019. Their debut album received positive reviews from music critics, such as Exclaim!, and NOW Magazine named the album the 10th best Toronto album of 2019.

== History ==
Formed in the summer of 2017, TRP.P's debut self-titled EP was released in 2017. At the time, Pagliacci was also a member of Canadian hip hop group, The Sorority. In 2018, Truss produced a track ("On Me") for The Sorority's debut album, Pledge.

In early 2019, Pagliacci left The Sorority to focus on TRP.P. The duo then released their debut album 2TRP.P in 2019, which was preceded by the singles "Love, Calm Down" and "Heart's Last Call".

In January 2020, they released a music video for their song "Chakra Con", directed by Lu Asfaha. In February 2020, they performed at the 20th annual Toronto's Wavelength Winter Festival.

In July 2020, they released a new single titled "Tell Me"; CBC Music called the track "a beautiful ode to reaching out to those in crisis and checking in with loved ones." Later that month, they performed at the Guelph's Hillside Homeside's online music festival.

== Personal life ==
The duo are romantically involved and, as of 2020, they are engaged. In an interview with Xtra, the couple discussed the importance of LGBT representation in hip hop; Truss is as transgender, while Pagliacci is queer.

== Discography ==
=== Studio albums ===
- 2TRP.P (2019)

=== EPs ===
- TRP.P (2017)

=== Singles ===
- "Love, Calm Down" (2019)
- "Heart's Last Call" (2019)
- "Chakra Con" (2019)
