= Orville Peck =

South African country musician (born 1988)

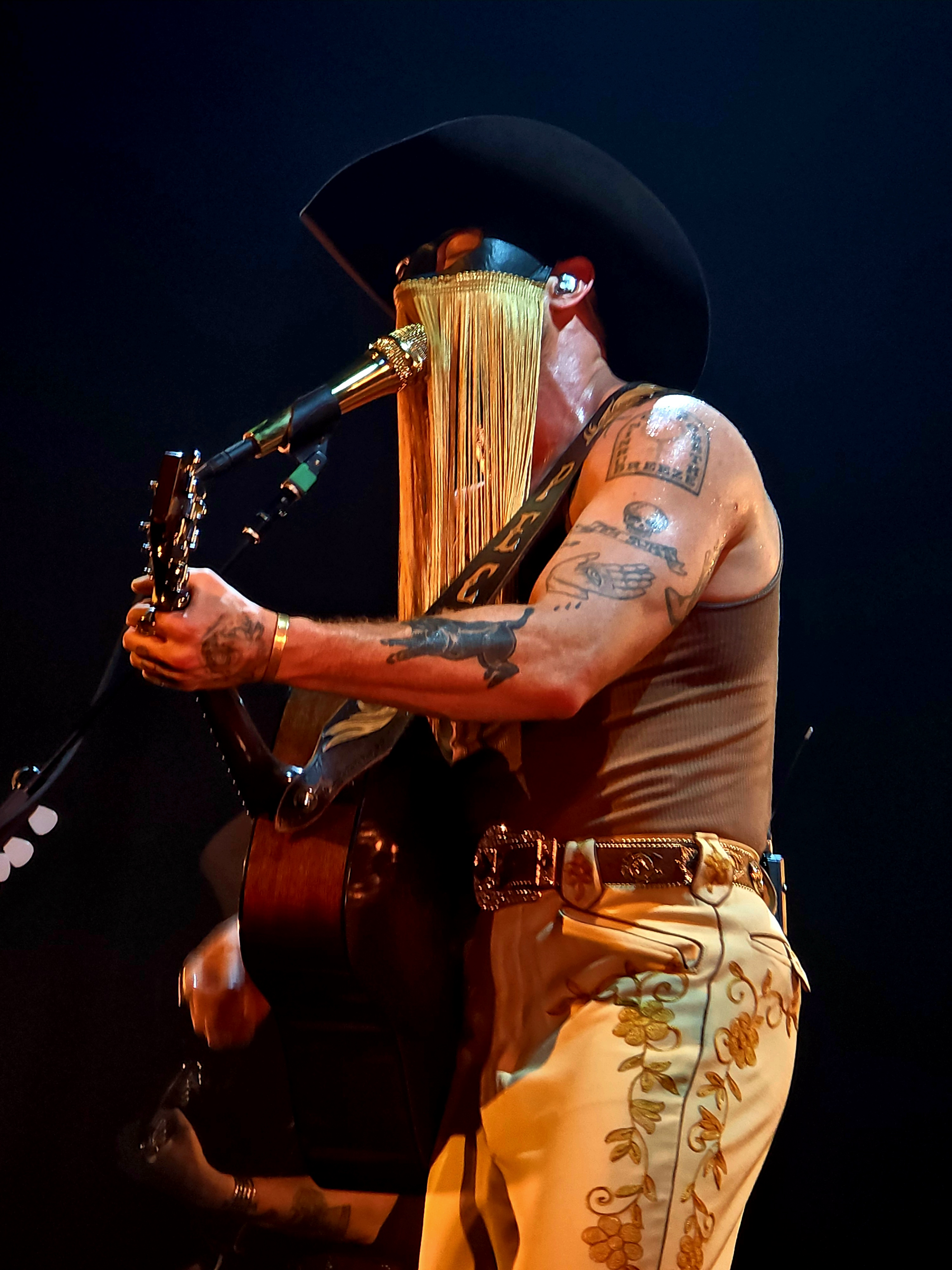
- Peck in 2026

Background information
- Born: Daniel Pitout; January 6, 1988 (age 38); Johannesburg, South Africa
- Genres: Country; alternative rock
- Occupations: Singer-songwriter; musician; actor
- Instruments: Vocals; drums; guitar; piano
- Years active: 2008–present
- Labels: Columbia; Sub Pop; Warner
- Formerly of: Nü Sensae
- Website: orvillepeck.com

Daniel Pitout (born January 6, 1988), known professionally as Orville Peck, is a South African country musician and actor based in the United States and Canada, widely known for often wearing a mask and not showing his face publicly.

He released his debut album Pony in 2019 followed by the EP Show Pony the next year. His second studio album Bronco was released in 2022. After a self-imposed hiatus in 2023, Peck released his third studio album Stampede in 2024. W Magazine said that his voice is a "deep, calm bass-baritone that recalls the bygone era of Johnny Cash and Roy Orbison; [his] haunting guitar riffs drift between rockabilly, blues, and dreamy shoegazing distortions."

== Early life ==
Peck was born in Johannesburg, South Africa, and lived there until he was 15. He grew up in a mixed-race family, and is "part-white, part-Indian". As a child, he taught himself music by playing an acoustic guitar and an old Casio keyboard. His father is a sound engineer and Orville did voice-over work for cartoons and other media as a child. Growing up, he took ballet classes for 12 years and performed in musical theater productions. Peck immigrated to Canada in 2003. By his early 20s, he had been on national tours of musicals.

Orville Peck moved to London for a foundation degree in acting from the London Academy of Music and Dramatic Art in 2014. He played Jonathan Harris/Peter Pan in the Mischief Theatre production of Peter Pan Goes Wrong at the Apollo Theatre in 2016.

== Career ==
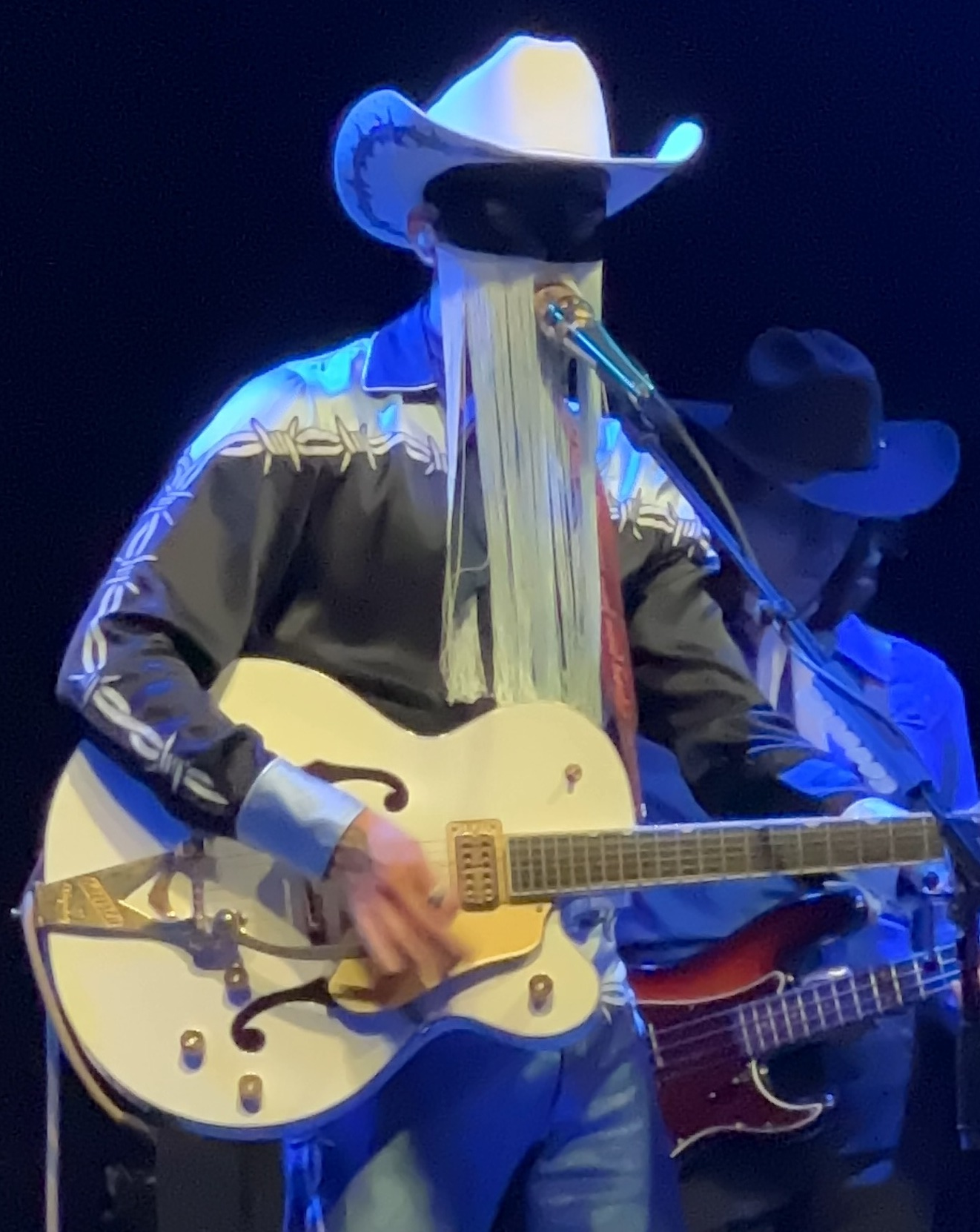
Peck performing at First Avenue, an event in Minneapolis, Minnesota, June 2022

Orville Peck developed his signature mask in 2018. Peck self-produced his debut album Pony at The Noise Floor recording studio on Gabriola Island, and released it in 2019 through a collaboration with Sub Pop. He has noted that he "wrote, produced and played every instrument he could" on the album while working in a coffee shop and living with his parents. In June of that year, he performed his songs "Dead of Night" and "Take You Back" live on CBC Radio One's Q. Pony was named to the initial longlist for the 2019 Polaris Music Prize in June 2019. The album received a Juno Award nomination for Alternative Album of the Year at the Juno Awards of 2020.

Also in 2019, Peck started an annual Orville Peck's Rodeo, which takes place in different cities across the US and brings in up-and-comers in the country music genre. He performed "Dead of Night" on Jimmy Kimmel Live on January 29, 2020. Peck announced a tour of selected cities in the United States including performances at the Coachella and Stagecoach festivals. In May 2020, he announced the follow-up to his debut album, an EP titled Show Pony, with a release date of June 12, 2020. In June 2020, he announced the delayed release of Show Pony until August 14, 2020, in recognition of the Black Lives Matter movement and the George Floyd protests. Peck recorded a cover of "Smalltown Boy" for the 2020 pride edition of the Spotify Singles series. The song was released exclusively on Spotify on June 29, 2020, and everywhere else on July 31, 2020.

In April 2021, Peck was featured on American drag queen and singer Trixie Mattel's EP, Full Coverage, Vol. 1. Peck appeared on a duet cover of Johnny Cash and June Carter Cash's "Jackson". Although not credited in the liner notes for the EP, Trixie Mattel has confirmed that the whistle part in "Video Games" is Peck's whistle. In June, Peck was revealed to be the sixth artist on Lady Gaga's Born This Way The Tenth Anniversary, with Peck reimagining the song "Born This Way" in a country style.

On March 16, 2023, Peck made an appearance as a guest on the judge's panel on MTV's RuPaul's Drag Race, alongside RuPaul Charles, Michelle Visage, and Ross Mathews. In 2023, Peck was a coach and judge on My Kind of Country. On April 5, 2024, he released a cover of Ned Sublette's "Cowboys Are Frequently, Secretly Fond of Each Other" with country singer Willie Nelson as the lead single from Stampede, Peck's third studio album and first duets album. The single marked his first release on Warner Records. He announced a headlining North American tour, The Stampede Tour which began on May 28, 2024, in Asheville, North Carolina. In May 2024, Peck released the duet "How Far Will We Take It?" with singer Noah Cyrus, the sister of Miley Cyrus. On June 7, 2024, Peck released the single "Midnight Ride" alongside Kylie Minogue and Diplo.

On March 31, 2025, Peck made his Broadway debut as the Emcee in the revival of Cabaret at the August Wilson Theatre opposite Eva Noblezada as Sally Bowles. In 2026, he made his film debut as Vega in the upcoming Street Fighter reboot. He made his Grand Ole Opry debut on July 21, 2026, where he performed "Dead of Night" and a cover of Dolly Parton's "I Will Always Love You".

== Artistry ==
=== Identity ===
It has been speculated that Orville Peck is a persona of Daniel Pitout, drummer of the Canadian punk band Nü Sensae, based on the similarity of their tattoos and Peck's mentioning that he was in a punk band. Pitout was born in Johannesburg as was Peck. Pitout is also listed by ASCAP as the songwriter for Peck's song "Old River" and other songs which match the titles of the songs released by Peck, such as "Roses Are Falling".

=== Influences ===
In an interview with National Public Radio on June 18, 2019, Orville said: "I've never raised cattle or anything like that, but I think I've been a cowboy my whole life." Peck strongly identifies with 1970s era country music and lists classic stars Merle Haggard, Waylon Jennings, George Jones, Tammy Wynette, Johnny Cash, Willie Nelson, Gram Parsons, Emmylou Harris, Bobbie Gentry, Reba McEntire, and Dolly Parton as his influences. Outside of country music, Peck has mentioned Roy Orbison, Oasis, Whitney Houston, and Lana Del Rey in addition to film directors David Lynch and John Waters as being influences.

== Personal life ==
Peck is gay. A shirtless selfie of Peck appeared in Out in April 2024, and an interview in the July 2024 issue of Paper was accompanied by semi-nude photos.

In 2008, Pitout posed unmasked for Gayletter. He has given various accounts of how he came to adopt a mask:

- In a 2019 interview with Vogue: "I just woke up one day and it was on my face, and it has always been there."
- In 2020: "The only reason I don't talk about it in depth is not because I want to dodge any questions, but because I want people to have their own take on it. I don't want to lay it out and pin it down. I just don't think that's important."
- In 2023: "fringed mask? I grew up loving country where there was an intersection between theatricality and very honest songwriting. Dolly's a perfect example—the big wigs, the crazy outfits, but it's her. For me, I was obsessed with the Lone Ranger, cowboys hiding their face, so that's what I wanted to do."

As of July 2024, Peck lives in Los Angeles. His home was featured in Architectural Digest in 2023.

== Awards and honors ==
Accolades for Orville Peck
Year	Award	Recipient(s) and nominee(s)	Category	Result
2019	Polaris Music Prize	Pony	Album of the Year	Longlisted
2020	Libera Awards	Himself	Best Breakthrough Artist	Won
2020	Libera Awards	Pony	Album of the Year	Nominated
2020	Libera Awards	Pony	Best Country Album	Won
2020	Libera Awards	"Dead of Night"	Video of the Year	Nominated
2020	Juno Awards	Pony	Alternative Album of the Year	Nominated
2021	GLAAD Media Awards	Show Pony	Outstanding Breakthrough Artist	Nominated
2021	Queerty Awards	"Summertime"	Indie Music Vid	Nominated
2022	Queerty Awards	"Born This Way"	Anthem	Nominated
2022	Tom of Finland Foundation	Himself	Cultural Icon Award	Won
2022	Polaris Music Prize	Bronco	Album of the Year	Longlisted
2023	GLAAD Media Awards	Bronco	Outstanding Music Artist	Nominated
2023	Juno Awards	Bronco	Country Album of the Year	Nominated
2023	Canadian Country Music Awards	Himself	Breakthrough Artist or Group of the Year	Nominated
2024	GLAAD Media Awards	Himself	GLAAD Vito Russo Award	Won

In June 2020, in honor of the 50th anniversary of the first LGBTQ pride parade, Queerty listed him among the 50 heroes "leading the nation toward equality, acceptance, and dignity for all people".

In June 2022, Peck was given the Cultural Icon Award by the Tom of Finland Foundation, "for artistic achievement and immeasurable contributions to the art and culture of our community"; the award was previously presented to Rob Halford, Henry Rollins, Clive Barker, and John Waters. The USPTO registered "Orville Peck" trademark (serial number 88665699) on June 2, 2020.

== Discography ==
Orville Peck discography
- Studio albums: 4
- EPs: 5
- Singles: 10
- Music videos: 14

=== Studio albums ===
Overview of full-length studio albums by Orville Peck
Title	Details	Peak chart positions									
Title	Details	AUS	SCO	UK	UK Amer.	UK Cou.	US	US Cou.	US Folk	US Indie	US Rock
Pony	Released: March 22, 2019; Label: Sub Pop; Format: CD, LP, cassette, digital download, streaming	—	—	—	8	12	— (Note: Pony did not enter the Billboard 200 but peaked at number 94 on the Top Album Sales chart.)	—	—	27	—
Bronco	Released: April 8, 2022; Label: Columbia; Format: LP, digital download, streaming	—	22	— (Note: Bronco did not enter the UK Albums Chart, but peaked at number 3 on the UK Album Downloads Chart.)	18	2	80	11	4	—	13
Stampede	Released: August 2, 2024; Label: Warner; Format: CD, LP, cassette, digital download, streaming	—	19	— (Note: Stampede did not enter the UK Albums Chart, but peaked at number 10 on the UK Album Downloads Chart.)	8	1	159	33	18	—	—
Mule	Released: September 18, 2026; Label: Warner; Format: CD, LP, digital download, streaming	49	11	90	—	1	134	19	9	—	—

=== Extended plays ===
Overview of extended plays by Orville Peck
Title	Details	Peak chart positions					
Title	Details	UK Amer.	UK DL	US Cou.	US Folk	US Rock	US Sales
Show Pony	Released: August 14, 2020; Label: Columbia; Format: vinyl, digital download, streaming	8	17	46	8	50	20
Bronco: Chapter 1	Released: February 11, 2022; Label: Columbia; Format: Streaming	—	—	—	—	—	—
Bronco: Chapters 1 & 2	Released: March 11, 2022; Label: Columbia; Format: Streaming	—	—	—	—	—	—
Stampede: Vol. 1	Released: May 10, 2024; Label: Warner	27	38	—	—	—	—
Appaloosa	Released: November 14, 2025; Label: Warner; Format: Vinyl, CD	—	—	—	—	—	—

=== Singles ===
==== As lead artist ====
Overview of singles by Orville Peck
Title	Year	Album
"Big Sky"	2018	Pony
"Dead of Night"	2019	Pony
"Turn to Hate"	2019	Pony
"Summertime"	2020	Show Pony
"No Glory in the West"	2020	Show Pony
"Smalltown Boy" (Spotify Singles)	2020	Non-album singles
"Unchained Melody"/"You've Lost That Lovin' Feelin'" (as The Unrighteous Brothers with Paul Cauthen)	2020	Non-album singles
"Born This Way" (The Country Road Version)	2021	Born This Way The Tenth Anniversary
"Miss Chatelaine" (Iron Hoof Remix) (with k. d. lang)	2021	Non-album singles
"Mona Lisas and Mad Hatters"	2022	Non-album singles
"This Masquerade"	2023	A Song for Leon: A Tribute to Leon Russell
"Cowboys Are Frequently, Secretly Fond of Each Other" (with Willie Nelson)	2024	Stampede: Vol. 1
"Midnight Ride" (with Kylie Minogue and Diplo)	2024	Stampede
"Death Valley High" (with Beck)	2024	Stampede
"Permanently Lonely"	2024	Skincare
"Happy Trails"	2024	Non-album single
"Drift Away"	2025	Appaloosa
"Prologue (Eulogy of a Man Turned Mule)" (with Emmylou Harris, Noah Cyrus and Allison Russell)	2026	Mule
"Too Little, Too Late"	2026	Mule

==== As featured artist ====
Overview of singles featuring Orville Peck
Title	Year	Album
"Jackson" (Trixie Mattel featuring Orville Peck)	2021	Full Coverage, Vol. 1
"Tennessee" (Kesha and Orville Peck featuring Tayla Parx and Hudson Mohawke)	2025	All Things Go: 10 Years
"Love Is a Canyon" (Noah Cyrus featuring Orville Peck)	2025	I Want My Loved Ones to Go with Me (expanded)

=== Guest appearances ===
Title	Year	Other artist(s)	Album
"Intro"	2020	Diplo	Diplo Presents Thomas Wesley, Chapter 1: Snake Oil
"I'm Making Believe"	2023	King Princess	A Small Light (Songs from the Limited Series)
"This Is Nowhere" (Long Version)	2023	—N/a	Hilda: Season 2 (Original Series Soundtrack)
"Cowboys Are Frequently, Secretly Fond of Each Other" (Live at The Hollywood Bowl)	2023	—N/a	Long Story Short: Willie Nelson 90 (Live at The Hollywood Bowl)
"Friends of Dorothy"	2025	The Wiggles	Wiggle Up, Giddy Up!

=== Music videos ===
Overview of Orville Peck music videos
Title	Year	Director
"Big Sky"	2018	Deni Cheng
"Dead of Night"	2019	Michael Maxxis
"Turn to Hate"	2019	Orville Peck; Carlos Santolalla
"Hope to Die"	2019	Blake Mawson
"Nothing Fades Like the Light"	2019	Deni Cheng
"Queen of the Rodeo"	2020	Austin Peters
"Summertime"	2020	Drew Kirsch; Taylor Fauntleroy
"No Glory in the West"	2020	Isaiah Seret
"Legends Never Die" (featuring Shania Twain)	2020	Cameron Duddy
"Jackson" (with Trixie Mattel)	2021	Assaad Yacoub
"C'mon Baby, Cry"	2022	Austin Peters
"Daytona Sand"	2022	Austin Peters
"The Curse of the Blackened Eye"	2022	Austin Peters
"Hexie Mountains"	2022	Austin Peters

== Filmography ==
Film work by Orville Peck
Year	Title	Role	Notes
2026	Street Fighter	Vega	

Television work by Orville Peck
Year	Title	Role	Notes
2021	The Boulet Brothers' Dragula	Guest judge	Season 4, episode 3
2021	This Is Pop	Host	Season 1, episode 5
2021	Miley Cyrus Presents: Stand by You	Himself	Performed "Cowboy Take Me Away" with Cyrus
2022	Trixie Motel	Guest	Episode 3
2023	RuPaul's Drag Race	Guest Judge	Season 15, episode 12 & 16 (Performer)
2023	RuPaul's Drag Race: Untucked	Himself	Episode: "Untucked: Wigloose: The Rusical!"
2023	My Kind of Country	Himself	Winning coach
2025	Kiff	Granite Rockberg	Episode: "Rock Kick/The Macaroni Affair"

Theatre work by Orville Peck
Year	Title	Role	Notes
2008	West Side Story	Action	Royal City Musical Theatre
2008	The Producers	Ensemble	Arts Club Theatre Company
2010	Joseph and the Amazing Technicolor Dreamcoat	Joseph's Brother	Royal City Musical Theatre
2016–2017	Peter Pan Goes Wrong	Jonathan Harris / Peter Pan	Apollo Theatre, West End
2025	Cabaret	The Emcee (replacement)	August Wilson Theatre, Broadway

== See also ==
- LGBTQ representation in country music
