= Keysha Freshh =

- Born: Keisha Fanfair; June 28, 1993 (age 32); Toronto, Ontario, Canada
- Origin: New York City, New York, U.S.
- Genres: Hip Hop
- Occupations: Rapper, Songwriter, Session producer
- Years active: 2007–present
- Labels: The Sorority Sound Inc, The Frozen Section
- Website: keyshaonline.com

Keysha Freshh (born June 28, 1993) born Keisha Fanfair, is a Canadian rapper and songwriter. Keysha is one-third of the hip-hop group The Sorority.

== Early life ==
Keysha was born in Toronto, Ontario, to Guyanese parents. Keysha attended high school in Ajax, Ontario, attending J. Clarke Richardson Collegiate and Archbishop Denis O'Connor Catholic High School. She completed college at Seneca College.

== Career ==
Keysha had her first song published at age five, and began performing locally that same year. She started writing her own music and rapping at the age of 11. In 2010, Keysha was invited to New York City to shoot her debut music video, "Hollywood Fresh", with Doug E. Fresh, who gave her the name "Freshh" as an add-on to Keysha. Keysha released her first project, entitled This is Keysha, in 2009, which was a USA-only release. Since then, Keysha has released seven solo projects. Keysha was part of an all-female cypher involving three other female Toronto rappers that went viral on International Women’s Day in 2016. The four rappers formed a group, The Sorority, later that year, releasing music throughout 2016 and 2017. In 2018, The Sorority released their debut album, Pledge, and embarked on their first headlining tour.

Keysha was the first female rapper in Canada to have three songs in rotation on commercial radio at the same time in 2010. That same year, she also became the first musician to shoot a music video inside the Empire State Building since 9/11.

In November 2016, Keysha released her sixth EP, In Samadhi, which received critical acclaim. The EP was chosen for the Pigeon and Planes Best of 2016 Staff Picks.

In June 2019, Keysha released her much-anticipated eighth solo project, Field Trip, to positive reviews.

In May 2019, Keysha teamed up with Canadian hip-hop artist Saukrates and DJ Nana to release an anti-gun violence anthem in the wake of the 400 shootings in Toronto in 2018.

Keysha collaborated with Maestro Fresh Wes on a children's album titled Julia The Great based on a character from his children's book Young Maestro School days. The album is nominated for Children's Album of the Year at the 2023 Juno Awards held in Edmonton, Alberta, on March 13.

== Discography ==
=== Albums ===
==== Solo ====
- This is Keysha (Demo, 2009, US only)
- Field Trip (2019)
- Pretty Boys Break My Heart (2024)

==== The Sorority ====
- Pledge (2018)

==== Pearls & Bones ====
- All the wrong places (2017)

=== Extended plays ===
- Mona Lisa (2012)
- Vanity (2014)
- In Samadhi (2016)
- shoulda ben done (2017)

=== Mixtapes ===
- Family Affair: La Familia (2010)
- Ran$om (2011)
- House Clothes (2022)
