= 13th Floor (album) =

Studio album by Haviah Mighty
- Released: May 10, 2019
- Genre: Hip hop
- Language: English
- Label: Independent
- Producers: Haviah Mighty, 2oolman, OBUXUM, Lambo, Mighty Prince, Robotaki, Taabu, Young Dreadz

Haviah Mighty chronology
| Flower City (2017) | 13th Floor (2019) | Stock Exchange (2021) |

Singles from 13th Floor
- 1. "In Women Colour" Released: March 8, 2019

Professional ratings
Review scores
| Source | Rating |
|---|---|
| Pitchfork | 7.5/10 |

13th Floor is the debut album from Canadian hip hop artist Haviah Mighty. The album was released on May 10, 2019, and was the winner of the 2019 Polaris Music Prize.

== Background and release ==
On March 23, 2019, Mighty announced her debut studio album, 13th Floor, via social media and that the album would arrive in 2019. CBC Music and Exclaim! described the album as one of the year's most anticipated Canadian releases.

The album's title derives from the phenomenon of high-rise buildings in many countries often not designating a 13th floor due to the superstition that the number 13 is bad luck. According to Haviah Mighty, "the 13th floor is something that we remove from our reality because it is something that we don’t understand and therefore we dismiss it"; the title therefore represents naming and speaking about and acknowledging issues and narratives that have been dismissed or ignored.

The album was released on May 10, with a corresponding performance on CBC Music's First Play Live.

== Reception ==
Max Mertens, writing for Pitchfork, called the album Mighty's "most cohesive and narratively ambitious project to date".

The album won the 2019 Polaris Music Prize, making Mighty the first hip-hop artist and first black woman to win the award.

== Track listing ==
All tracks are written by Haviah Mighty.

| No. | Title | Length |
|---|---|---|
| 1. | "In Women Colour" | 3:00 |
| 2. | "Waves (feat. Sean Leon)" | 3:40 |
| 3. | "Wishy Washy (feat. Omega Mighty)" | 3:38 |
| 4. | "Blame" | 3:08 |
| 5. | "Thirteen" | 3:08 |
| 6. | "Smoke (feat. Clairmont the Second)" | 3:37 |
| 7. | "You Don't Love Me" | 3:43 |
| 8. | "Fugazi" | 2:39 |
| 9. | "Squad" | 2:58 |
| 10. | "Oh My" | 2:44 |
| 11. | "Ride" | 3:01 |
| 12. | "Bag Up" | 2:29 |
| 13. | "Kiss It" | 3:21 |
