= Pony (Orville Peck album) =

Studio album by Orville Peck
- Released: March 22, 2019
- Studio: The Noise Floor
- Genres: Country; alternative country; cowboy pop
- Length: 41:52
- Label: Sub Pop

Orville Peck chronology
Pony (2019)	Show Pony (2020)

Singles from Pony
- 1. "Big Sky" Released: December 3, 2018; 2. "Dead of Night" Released: January 16, 2019; 3. "Turn to Hate" Released: February 20, 2019

Pony is the debut studio album by South African country musician Orville Peck, released on March 22, 2019 by Sub Pop. A country, alternative country, and cowboy pop album, Pony features elements of goth, dream pop, shoegaze, indie rock, surf rock, post-punk and gospel folk.

Pony was named to the initial longlist for the 2019 Polaris Music Prize in June 2019. The album also received a Juno Award nomination for Alternative Album of the Year at the Juno Awards of 2020.

== Promotion ==
The album was promoted by the singles "Dead of Night", "Big Sky", "Turn to Hate", "Hope to Die", "Nothing Fades Like the Light", and "Queen of the Rodeo". "Dead of Night" and "Take You Back" were performed live on CBC Radio One's Q in June 2019. "Dead of Night" was performed on Jimmy Kimmel Live on January 29, 2020. A tour of selected cities in the United States was also announced for Spring 2020, including performances at the Coachella and Stagecoach festivals. However, due to the COVID-19 pandemic, the tour was postponed.

== Themes and influences ==
Pony mainly focuses on themes of love and heartbreak through lyrical storytelling, with many characters based on people from the artist's own life. Peck describes the inspiration behind the album as his "love letter to a classic country album … a collection of stories." Tracks from the album such as "Big Sky" and "Dead of Night" portray different characters falling in and out of love and the escapades of their lives, whereas "Roses Are Falling" describes a fictional love interest that the narrator loves so much, they want to kill them. "Turn To Hate" discusses personal heartbreak and "the anxiety that comes with being on the outside of things," while trying to keep one's sorrow from developing into hatred. Peck's self-described 'visual approach' to music combines his adoration for classic cowboy imagery such as Nudie suits with modern fashion elements, especially the musician's famous fringe mask that conceals his identity.

== Critical reception ==
Professional ratings
Aggregate scores
Source	Rating
Metacritic	77/100
Review scores
Source	Rating
Allmusic	4.5/5 stars
Clash	8/10
Exclaim!	7/10
The Line of Best Fit	8.5/10

Pony received generally positive reviews from critics. Many critics praised Peck's reverence for traditional country styles, as well as the album's exploration of queer themes. "Tracks like 'Roses Are Falling' and 'Take You Back (The Iron Hoof Cattle Call)' are solid entries to the classic country canon of Glen Campbell and Loretta Lynn, while his impressive vocal range helps keep the album varied." said Matt Bobkin of Exclaim!.

=== Year-end lists ===
Accolades for Pony
Publication	List	Rank
Clash	Clash Albums Of The Year 2019	10
The Fader	Best Albums of the Year	N/A
NME	50 Best Albums of the 2019	39
PopMatters	The 70 Best Albums of 2019	69
Thrillist	Best Albums of 2019	26

== Track listing ==
All tracks are written by Orville Peck, except where noted.

Pony track listing
No.	Title	Length
1.	"Dead of Night"	3:59
2.	"Winds Change" (Duncan Hay Jennings, Peck)	2:59
3.	"Turn to Hate"	4:56
4.	"Buffalo Run"	3:39
5.	"Queen of the Rodeo"	3:18
6.	"Kansas (Remembers Me Now)" (Peck, Jennings)	3:36
7.	"Old River"	1:02
8.	"Big Sky"	3:32
9.	"Roses Are Falling"	3:06
10.	"Take You Back (The Iron Hoof Cattle Call)"	3:28
11.	"Hope to Die"	4:30
12.	"Nothing Fades Like the Light"	3:47
Total length:		41:52

== Personnel ==
- Orville Peck – vocals, guitar, banjo, keyboards
- Duncan Hay Jennings – guitar, keyboards
- Lucas Savatti – bass
- Kris Bowering – drums
- Tina Jones – banjo
- Jordan Koop – additional guitar; recording, mixing
- Terry Ondang – backup vocals on "Dead of Night"
- Evan Desjardins – additional vocal recordings
- Sean Pearson – additional recordings
- Harris Newman – mastering
- Gordon Nicholas – cover photo
- Matt McCormick – insert illustration

== Charts ==
Chart performance for Pony
Chart (2019–2020)	Peak position
UK Americana Albums (Official Charts)	8
US Heatseekers Albums (Billboard)	5
US Independent Albums (Billboard)	27
US Top Album Sales (Billboard)	94

Chart performance for Pony
Chart (2025)	Peak position
Croatian International Albums (HDU)	5
