= Friend of Dorothy =

Code word for a gay man

A "friend of Dorothy" (FOD) is a code word for a gay man, first used in LGBTQ slang. Stating that, or asking if, someone is a friend of Dorothy is a furtive way of suggesting sexual orientation while avoiding hostility. The term was likely based on the character Dorothy Gale of the Oz series of novels, which have been interpreted as including much queer subtext. Actress Judy Garland, who portrayed Dorothy in the 1939 Wizard of Oz film, is considered a gay icon. Writer and critic Dorothy Parker is thought to be another potential origin of the term.

== Dorothy from Oz and Judy Garland ==
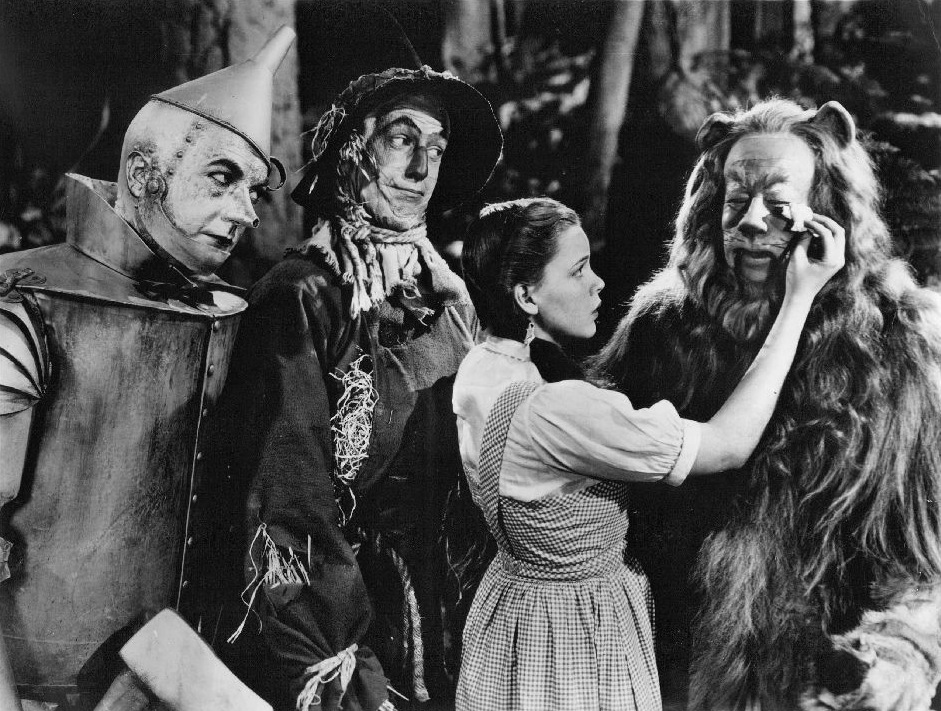
Dorothy (Judy Garland) and her "queer friends", based on whom the shibboleth may be coined

Many sources propose that "friend of Dorothy" refers to the 1939 film adaptation The Wizard of Oz because Judy Garland, who starred as the main character Dorothy, is a gay icon. The Wizard of Oz has a "particular resonance in the culture of the queer community". Many see Garland's portrayal as a "queer journey, an escape from the puritanical, morally rigid, black-and-white small-town life to Technicolor city existence with fabulous friends". According to United Press International's Marilyn Malara, "In the 1950s and 1960s, Garland acted as an unofficial mascot for a generation of gay men, who flocked to Garland's many performances, referring to themselves as 'friends of Dorothy.'"

== Dorothy Parker ==
Predating Oz-related origins of the phrase was New York City's celebrated humorist, critic and "defender of human and civil rights" Dorothy Parker, whose social circles in the 1920s and 1930s included gay men. Parker would throw "famous parties at Garden of Allah's lavish celebrity villas". She would invite gay men, who would in turn invite other gay men to her gatherings using the code phrase "friend of Dorothy" to gain entry. The two origin stories are not mutually exclusive; both could be somewhat true depending on how one learned of the phrase, or even multiple origins in different communities.

== Usage ==
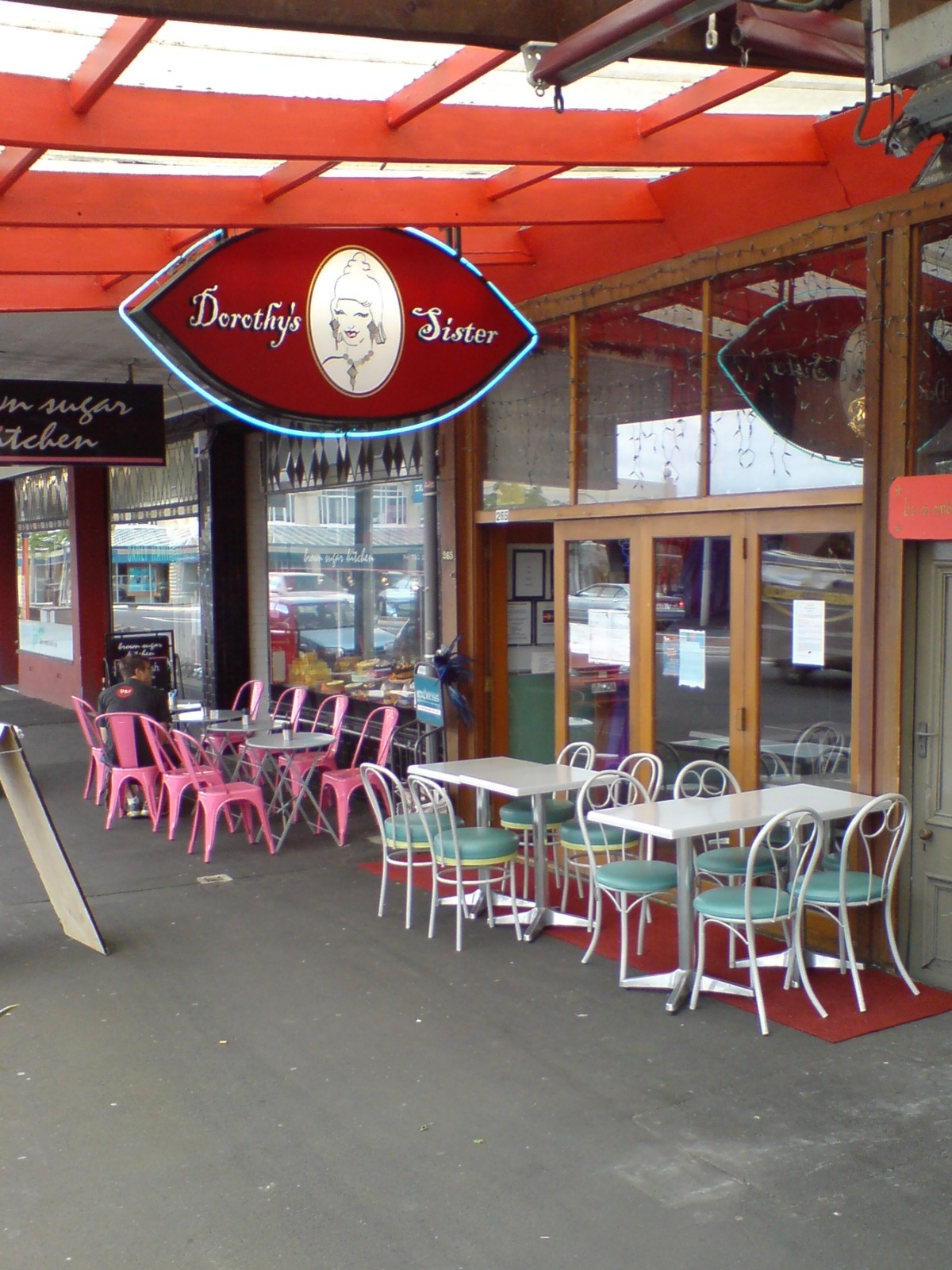
The name of this cafe, Dorothy's Sister, in Ponsonby, Auckland's gay village, is a play on the slang term.

Starting in the late 1980s, on several cruise lines, gay and lesbian passengers began approaching ship staff, asking them to publicise gatherings in the daily cruise activity list. As the cruise lines were hesitant to announce such things so blatantly in their daily publications, they would list the gathering as a "Meeting of the Friends of Dorothy".

== Misunderstanding ==
In the late 1970s and early 1980s, the Naval Investigative Service (NIS), the predecessor to the modern-day Naval Criminal Investigative Service (NCIS), was investigating homosexuality in the Chicago area. Agents discovered that gay men sometimes referred to themselves as "friends of Dorothy". Unaware of the historical meaning of the term, the NIS believed that there actually was a woman named Dorothy at the center of a massive ring of homosexual military personnel, so they launched an enormous and futile hunt for the elusive "Dorothy", hoping to find her and convince her to reveal the names of gay service members.

== Friend of Mrs. King ==
Similar to "friend of Dorothy" is "friend of Mrs. King" (i.e., queen, in the meaning of "gay man"). This was used in England, mostly from the 1900s to the 1950s.
