= LAL (band) =

- Origin: Toronto, Ontario, Canada
- Genres: House; Ambient Downtempo
- Years active: 2009–present
- Labels: DNH; Coax Records; Public Transit Recordings
- Members: Rosina Kazi; Nicholas Murray
- Website: lalmusic.ca

LAL is a Toronto-based collective of musicians representing Uganda, Bangladesh, Barbados, and India featuring vocalist Rosina Kazi, laptop musician Nicholas "Murr" Murray, and bassist Ian de Sousa. The group's sound fuses South-Asian roots, West Indian fruits, and melancholic vocals with jazz and hip hop influences, down tempo grooves, broken soul, and electro. Their song lyrics are socially conscious poetry.

== History ==
LAL formed in 1998. The band members, Rosina Kazi and Nicholas "Murr" Murray met while working in the record store HMV basement in the 1990's.

“Lal [in several South Asian languages] means red. The colour itself is associated with rebellion, revolution, love, anger, passion…and I think these things also reflect who we are and what we bring as musicians. We sound like migration, we sound like deportation. We sound like everything changed and taken into another world.”

— Rosina Kazi – lyricist and vocals

LAL has produced four studio albums, including Corners (2002), and Warm Belly High Power (2004), which was named the best soul album of 2004 by Exclaim!.

LAL have also performed in a variety of festivals and venues across Canada, Europe, and Pakistan. They received support from the Canada Council for the Arts for composing and recording in 2006–2007. LAL's third album is Deportation; the album featured 20 guest artists.

LAL released the album Find Safety in 2016. LAL announced the release of a new album titled Meteors Could Come Down which released on 6 November 2020.

== Discography ==
- Corners (1998)
- Warm Belly High Power (2002)
- Deportation (2008)
- Find Safety (2016)
- Meteors Could Come Down (2020)
- A Practice of Love (2026)
