= Judy Garland as a gay icon =

Overview of the actress in gay culture

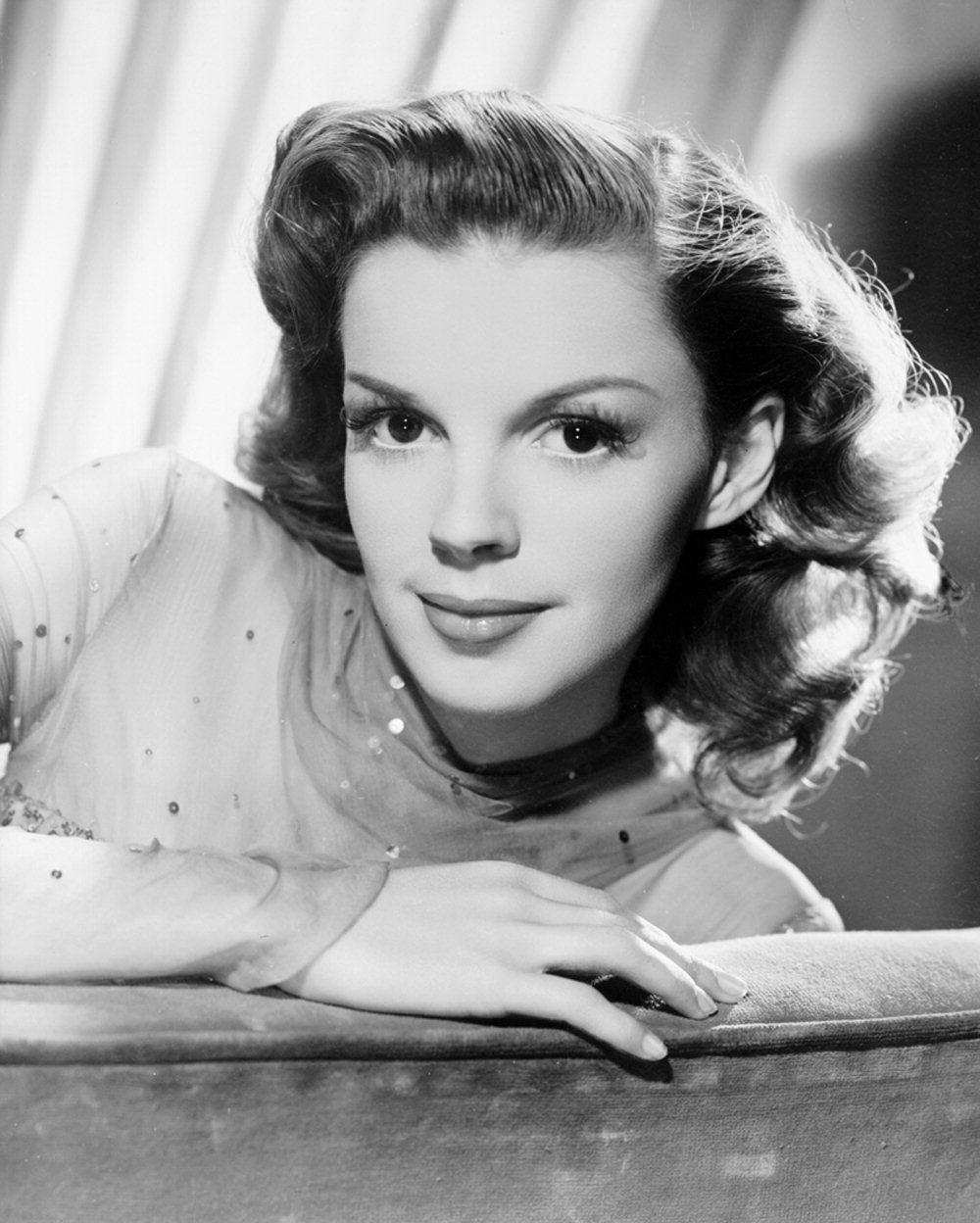
Judy Garland in 1946

American actress and singer Judy Garland (1922–1969) is widely considered as a gay icon. The Advocate has called Garland "The Elvis of homosexuals". The reasons frequently given for her standing as an icon among gay men are admiration of her ability as a performer, the way her personal struggles seemed to mirror those of gay men in the United States during the height of her fame, and her value as a camp figure. Garland's role as Dorothy Gale in The Wizard of Oz is particularly known for contributing to this status. In the 1960s, when a reporter asked how she felt about having a large gay following, Garland replied, "I couldn't care less. I sing to people!"

== Garland as tragic figure ==
The aspects of gay identification with Garland were being discussed in the mainstream as early as 1967. Time magazine, in reviewing Garland's 1967 Palace Theatre engagement, disparagingly noted that a "disproportionate part of her nightly claque seems to be homosexual". It goes on to say that "[t]he boys in the tight trousers" (a phrase Time repeatedly used to describe gay men, as when it described "ecstatic young men in tight trousers pranc[ing] down the aisles to toss bouquets of roses" to another gay icon, Marlene Dietrich) would "roll their eyes, tear at their hair and practically levitate from their seats" during Garland's performances. Time then attempted to explain Garland's appeal to the homosexual, consulting psychiatrists who opined that "the attraction [to Garland] might be made considerably stronger by the fact that she has survived so many problems; homosexuals identify with that kind of hysteria" and that "Judy was beaten up by life, embattled, and ultimately had to become more masculine. She has the power that homosexuals would like to have, and they attempt to attain it by idolizing her."

Writer William Goldman, in a piece for Esquire magazine about the same Palace engagement, again disparages the gay men in attendance, dismissing them as "fags" who "flit by" chattering inanely. He goes on, however, to advance the tragic figure theory as well. After first suggesting that "if [homosexuals] have an enemy, it is age. And Garland is youth, perennially, over the rainbow", he wrote:

Homosexuals tend to identify with suffering. They are a persecuted group and they understand suffering. And so does Garland. She's been through the fire and lived – all the drinking and divorcing, all the pills and all the men, all the poundage come and gone – brothers and sisters, she knows.

Openly gay comedian Bob Smith offers a comic take on the tragic figure theory, imagining an "Elvis king" and a "Judy queen", debating the idols:

Elvis had a drinking problem.
Judy could drink Elvis under the table.
Elvis gained more weight.
Judy lost more weight.
Elvis was addicted to painkillers.
No pill could stop Judy's pain!

== Garland as camp ==
In discussing Judy Garland's camp appeal, gay film scholar Richard Dyer has defined camp as "a characteristically gay way of handling the values, images and products of the dominant culture through irony, exaggeration, trivialisation, theatricalisation and an ambivalent making fun of and out of the serious and respectable". Garland is camp, he asserts, because she is "imitable, her appearance and gestures copiable in drag acts". He calls her "ordinariness" in her early MGM films camp in their "failed seriousness" and her later style "wonderfully over-the-top".

== Friend of Dorothy ==
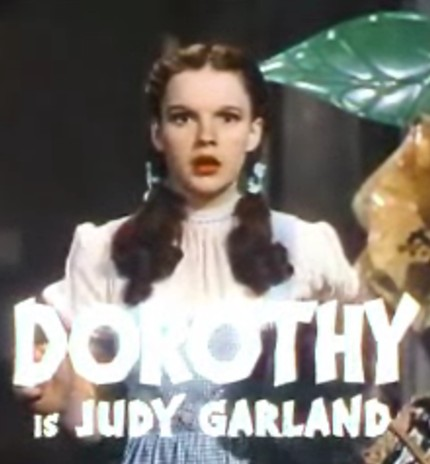
Garland from the trailer for the 1939 film The Wizard of Oz

Other connections between Garland and the LGBTQ community include the slang term "Friend of Dorothy", which likely derives from Garland's portrayal of Dorothy Gale in The Wizard of Oz and became a code phrase gay men used to identify each other. Dorothy's journey from Kansas to Oz "mirrored many gay men's desires to escape the black-and-white limitations of small-town life ... for big, colorful cities filled with quirky, gender-bending characters who would welcome them."

In the film, Dorothy immediately accepts those who are different, including the Cowardly Lion (in a very camp performance by Bert Lahr). The Lion identifies himself through song as a "sissy" and exhibits stereotypically "gay" (or at least effeminate) mannerisms. The Lion is seen as a coded example of Garland meeting and accepting a gay man without question.

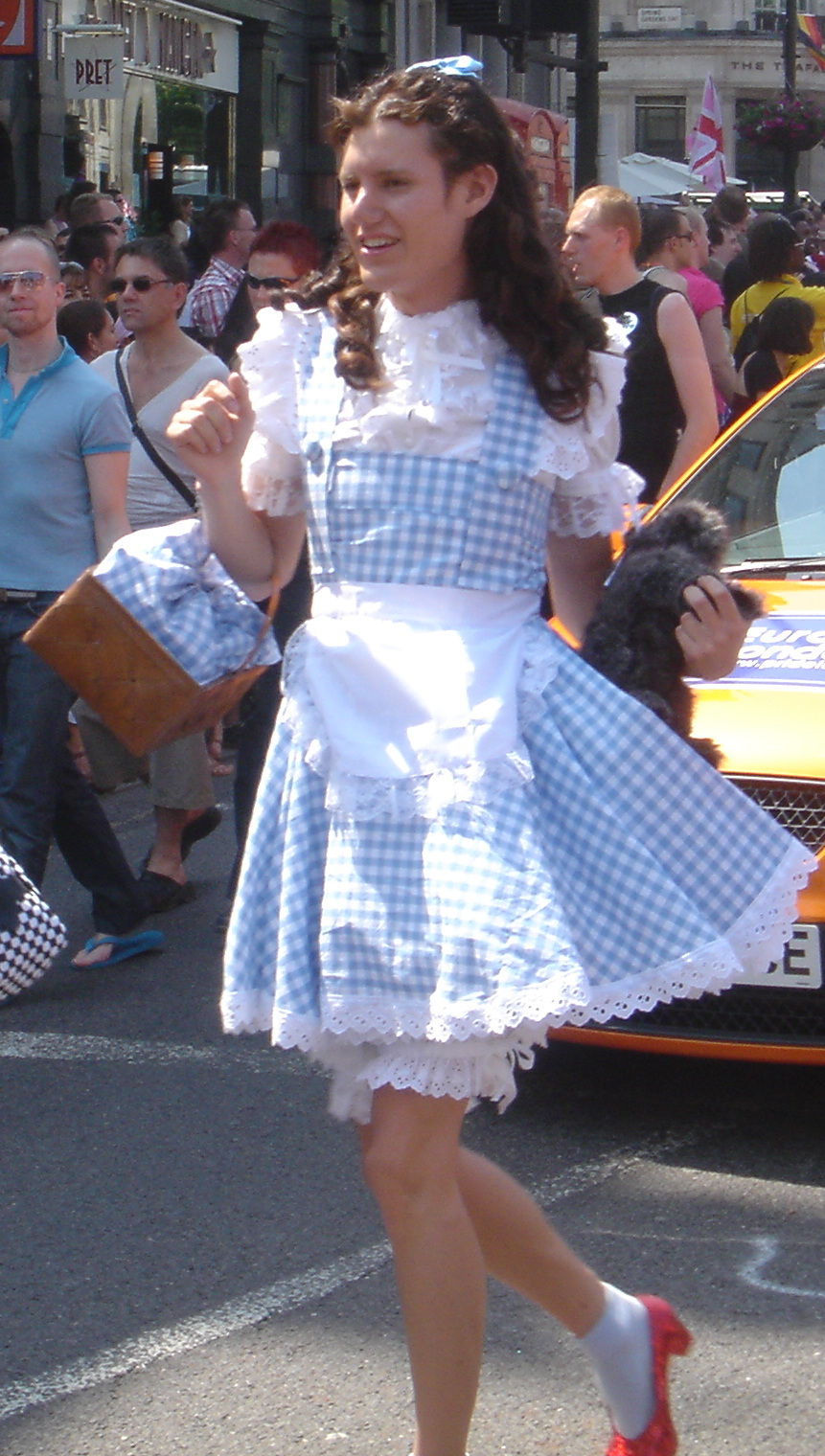
An attendee of EuroPride 2006 dressed as Dorothy Gale

In the 2001 documentary Memories of Oz, gay cult film director and social satirist John Waters spoke about seeing The Wizard of Oz as a child:

[I was] the only child in the audience that always wondered why Dorothy ever wanted to go back to Kansas. Why would she want to go back to Kansas, in this dreary black and white farm with an aunt who dressed badly and seemed mean to me, when she could live with magic shoes, winged monkeys and gay lions? I never understood it.

The 2020 comedic short film Digging Up Dorothy features a drag queen's obsession with Judy Garland several decades after her death.

== Stonewall riots ==
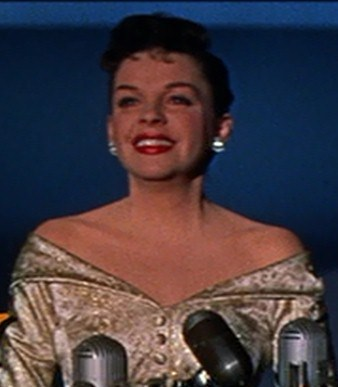
Garland in A Star Is Born (1954)

Some have suggested a connection between the date of Garland's funeral on June 27, 1969, and the Stonewall riots, the flashpoint of the modern gay liberation movement, which started in the early hours of June 28. Some observers of the riots contend that most of those involved "were not the type to moon over Judy Garland records or attend her concerts at Carnegie Hall. They were more preoccupied with where they were going to sleep and where their next meal would come from." However, the same historical documentary states that there were several patrons at the Stonewall bar that night, Garland fans who, according to bar patron Sylvia Rivera, had come from the very emotional Garland funeral earlier in the day to drink and mourn. Rivera said that indeed there was a feeling in the air that something would happen that night: "I guess Judy Garland's death just really helped us really hit the fan."

There was certainly an awareness and appreciation of Garland among Stonewall Inn patrons. Because the bar had no liquor license, it was passed off as a bottle club and patrons were required to sign in. Many used pseudonyms and "Judy Garland" was among the most popular. Regardless of the truth of the matter, the Garland/Stonewall connection has persisted and has been fictionalized in Stonewall, Nigel Finch's feature film about the events leading up to the riots. Lead character Bostonia is shown watching Garland's funeral on television and mourning, and later refusing to silence a jukebox playing a Garland song during a police raid, declaring "Judy stays."

Time magazine would summarize decades later:

The uprising was inspirited by a potent cocktail of pent-up rage (raids of gay bars were brutal and routine), overwrought emotions (hours earlier, thousands had wept at the funeral of Judy Garland) and drugs. As a 17-year-old cross-dresser was being led into the paddy wagon and got a shove from a cop, she fought back. [She] hit the cop and was so stoned, she didn't know what she was doing—or didn't care.

Garland's daughter Lorna Luft points to the connection with pride, saying that her mother was a "huge, huge advocate of human rights" and that Garland would have found the rioting appropriate.

== Rainbow flag ==
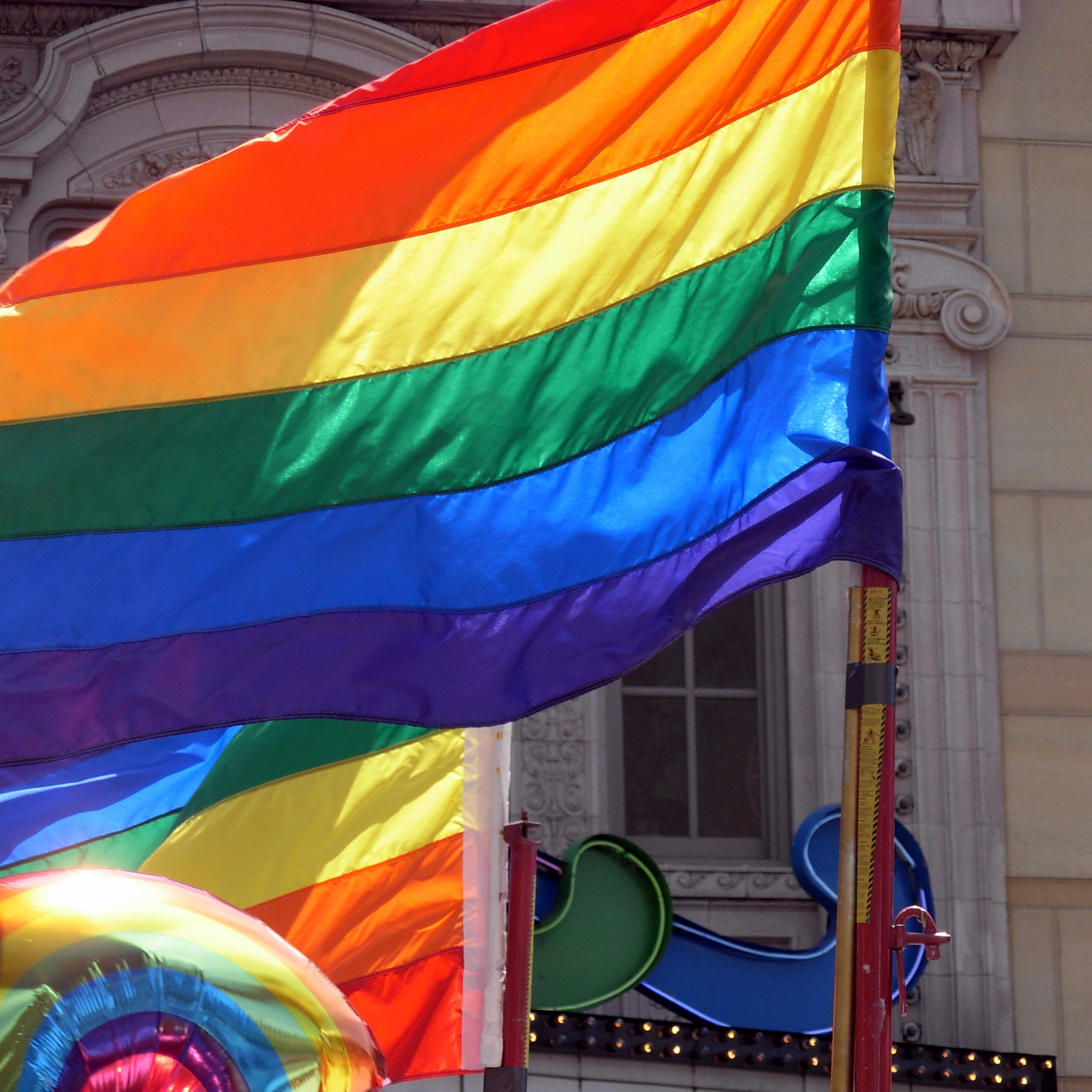
Six-color rainbow gay pride flags in a parade on the anniversary of Stonewall

Another connection is the rainbow flag, symbol of the LGBTQ communities which may have been inspired, in part, by Garland's song "Over the Rainbow". Garland's performance of this song has been described as "the sound of the closet", speaking to gay men whose image "they presented in their own public lives was often at odds with a truer sense of self that mainstream society would not condone". However, when asked, the flag's creator Gilbert Baker said that the flag was "more about the Rolling Stones and their song 'She's a Rainbow.'"

== Family and friends ==
Judy Garland's father and other significant people in her life were also gay. Her father, Frank Gumm, would apparently seduce or at least keep company with very young men or older teens, then move on when told to leave or before his activities could be discovered. Garland's second husband Vincente Minnelli was rumored to be a closeted bisexual, and her fourth husband Mark Herron had a long-lasting relationship with fellow actor Henry Brandon, which was only briefly interrupted by his marriage to Garland. She introduced her daughter Liza to her future husband, Australian singer Peter Allen who was also gay. From the beginning of her Hollywood career, Garland liked to visit gay bars with openly gay friends Roger Edens, Charles Walters and George Cukor, to the chagrin of her handlers at MGM.

== See also ==
- LGBTQ history
- New Queer Cinema
- Queer theory
