= Haviah Mighty =

Canadian rapper (born 1992)

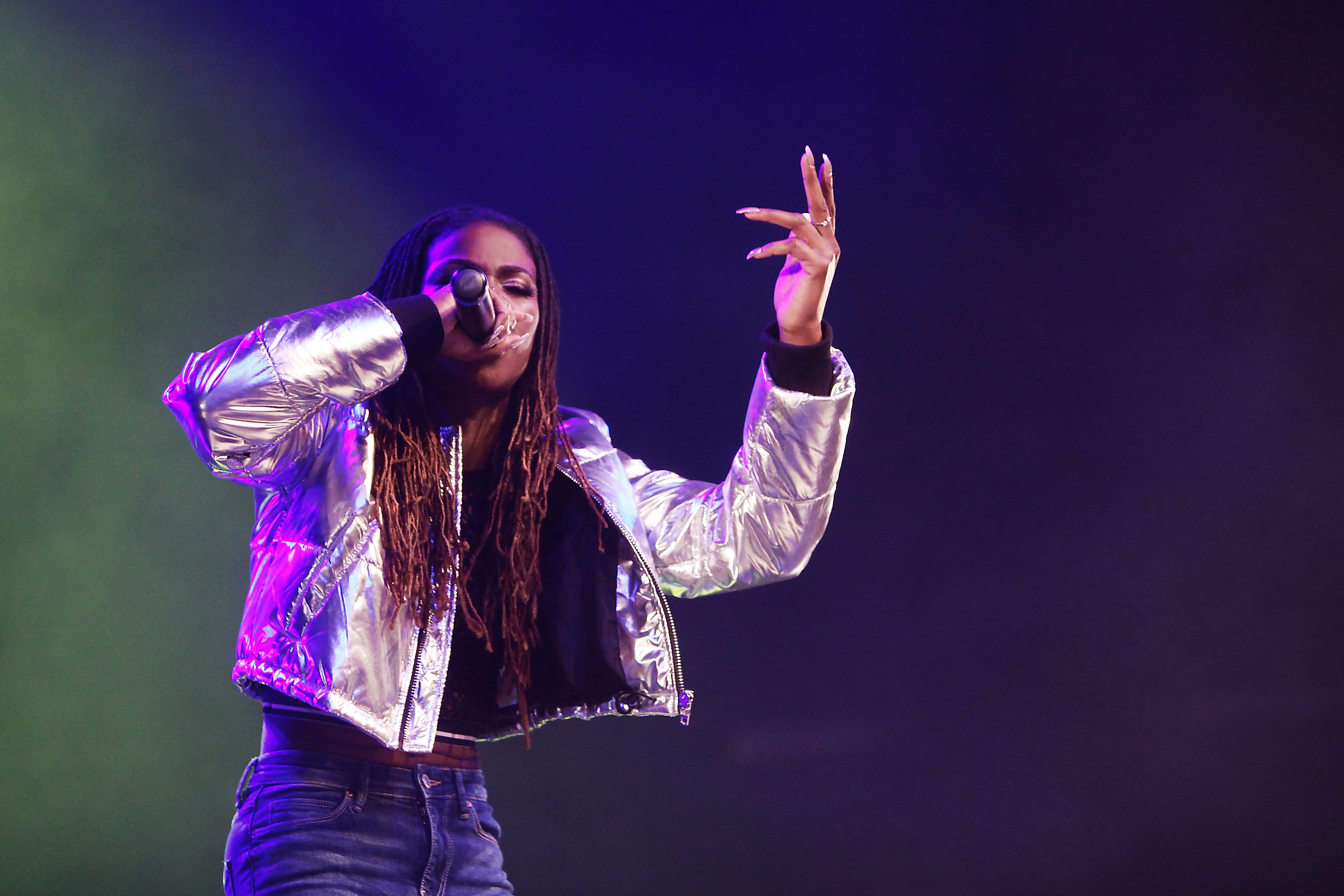
- Mighty performing in 2018

Background information
- Born: December 17, 1992 (age 33); Toronto, Canada
- Genre: Hip hop
- Occupations: Rapper; singer
- Instrument: Vocals
- Formerly of: The Sorority
- Website: haviahmighty.ca

Haviah Mighty (born December 17, 1992) is a Canadian rapper from Brampton, Ontario. She rose to prominence in 2016 as a member of the hip hop group the Sorority, before releasing several EPs on her own, most notably Flower City, in 2017. Her first album, 13th Floor, was released in 2019 and won the Polaris Music Prize. After her debut, XXL named her one of the "15 Toronto rappers you should know" and CBC Music called her one of the "New Faces of Canadian Hip Hop".

In 2021, she released the mixtape Stock Exchange, which later won the 2022 Juno Award for Rap Album/EP of the Year.

== Early life ==
Mighty was born in Toronto and took music lessons in Scarborough beginning at the age of four, before moving to Brampton. Her fifth record is named Flower City in homage to the city's nickname.

== Music career ==
Mighty began producing music at the age of fifteen. At seventeen, she independently released her first mixtape, No Studio, in 2010. She then went on to issue three projects, entitled #EIGHTEEN, Dominant 7eventh, and Bass Loud. She won So You Think You Can Rap Canada, a national talent competition, and also got the opportunity to perform at CNE's Rising Star Talent in 2016. She released a cypher for International Women's Day in 2017 together with three other Toronto-area female rappers. The four later formed the group The Sorority together.

=== Flower City (2017–2018) ===
In 2017, Mighty released her fifth EP, titled Flower City, garnering media attention and critical acclaim. The album was named one of Complex's favourite Canadian releases of 2017. A song from the EP, "Pull Up", was named one of the best Toronto tracks of the first half of 2017 by Now Magazine. On September 7, 2018, her single "Vamonos" was featured on the third season of HBO's Insecure. Mighty was announced as a member of the Juno Award Masterclass program for 2018/19. In addition, The Sorority released their debut album, Pledge, in 2018 and toured throughout the year. In 2019, Mighty and Book's song "Champion" was featured in EA's NHL 20.

=== 13th Floor, Stock Exchange (2019–2021) ===
On March 23, 2019, Mighty announced her debut studio album, 13th Floor, via social media, and stated that the album would arrive in 2019. 13th Floor became one of the most anticipated Canadian albums of 2019, according to both CBC Music and Exclaim!. The lead single, "In Women Colour", was released to positive reviews and was deemed an anthem by Complex magazine. The record was released on May 10, 2019, to positive reviews. In July 2019, 13th Floor was shortlisted for the 2019 Polaris Music Prize, which Mighty won on September 16.

The album title is a reference to the thirteenth floor phenomenon, where the thirteenth floor of a building is omitted, due to the number 13 being seen as unlucky. Mighty contends it is "something that we remove from our reality because it is something that we don't understand and therefore we dismiss it", and uses the album to deal with subject matter that she believes many choose to ignore. Mighty has also pointed to the lack of discussion surrounding the Thirteenth Amendment to the United States Constitution, compared to the second or first amendments.

In 2020, Mighty was featured on Tobi's "24 (Toronto Remix)" and its corresponding music video, along with Shad, Jazz Cartier, and Ejji Smith. Her song "Thirteen" was shortlisted for the 2020 SOCAN Songwriting Prize. She also released a single, "Occasion", in December 2020. The music video for her song "Thirteen", directed by Theo Kapodistrias, won the 2021 Prism Prize.

Mighty performed at the 2021 FreeUp! The Emancipation Day Special.

On November 12, 2021, Mighty released the mixtape Stock Exchange.

In 2022, Mighty toured with Arkells as the supporting act for their Blink Once tour.

In 2023, she participated in an all-star recording of Serena Ryder's song "What I Wouldn't Do", which was released as a charity single to benefit Kids Help Phone's Feel Out Loud campaign for youth mental health.

== Discography ==
=== with the Sorority ===
- Pledge (2018)

=== Solo ===
Studio albums

- 13th Floor (2019)
- Crying Crystals (2023)

EPs

- #Eighteen (2011)
- Dominant 7eventh (2013)
- Flower City (2017)

Mixtapes

- No Studio (2010)
- Bass Loud (2015)
- Stock Exchange (2021)

Singles

- "Vamonos" (2018)
- "In Women Colour" (2019)
- "Champion" with Book (2019)
- "Atlantic" (2020)
- "Occasion" (2020)
- "Antisocial" feat. Old Man Saxon (2021)
- "Obeah" (2021)
- "Way Too Fast" feat. Jalen Santoy (2021)
- "Protest" feat. Yizzy (2021)
- "Tesla" (2021)
- "Honey Bun" (2021)
- "Room Service" (2023)
- "Huh" (2023)
- "Double the Fun" (2024)
- "Lucky" feat. Shantel May (2025)

== Awards and nominations ==
Year	Award	Category	Nominee/Work	Result
2019	Polaris Music Prize	Winner	13th Floor	Won
2022	Juno Awards	Rap Album of the Year	Stock Exchange	Won
