= FRIGS =

Canadian indie rock band

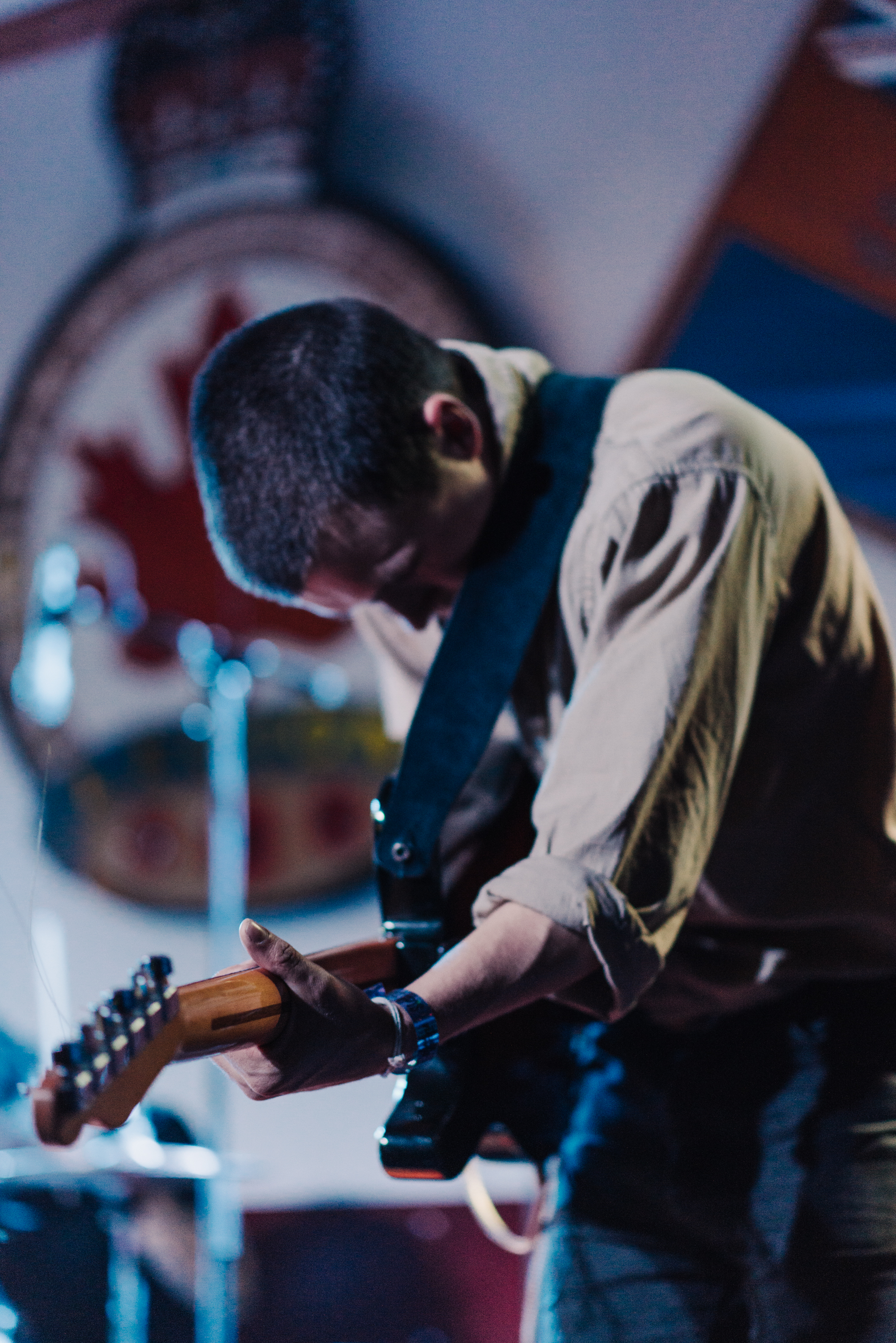

Background information
- Origin: Toronto, Ontario, Canada
- Genre: indie rock
- Years active: 2013 - 2018
- Label: Arts & Crafts
- Members: Bria Salmena; Duncan Hay Jennings; Lucas Savatti; Kris Bowering

FRIGS were a Canadian indie rock band from Toronto, Ontario, whose 2018 album Basic Behaviour was longlisted for the 2018 Polaris Music Prize. The band members are vocalist Bria Salmena, guitarist Duncan Hay Jennings, bassist Lucas Savatti and drummer Kris Bowering.

== History ==
The band performed live shows in the Toronto area, and produced and released a self-titled EP under the name Dirty Frigs in 2014 before signing to Arts & Crafts, which released their second EP, Slush, in 2016.

Basic Behaviour, the band's first full-length album, was released in 2018, with cover art by Olenka Szymonski. To support the album, the band set out on a 37-day tour.

Since 2019, Bowering, Hay Jennings, and Salmena, along with Toronto bassist Kyle Connolly, have been members of Orville Peck's touring band. Savatti played on Peck's Pony album, along with Bowering and Hay Jennings.

Salmena has also released two EPs of country music covers as a solo artist, Cuntry Covers Vol. 1 (2021) and Cuntry Covers Vol. 2 (2023).
