= Ned Sublette =

American singer-songwriter

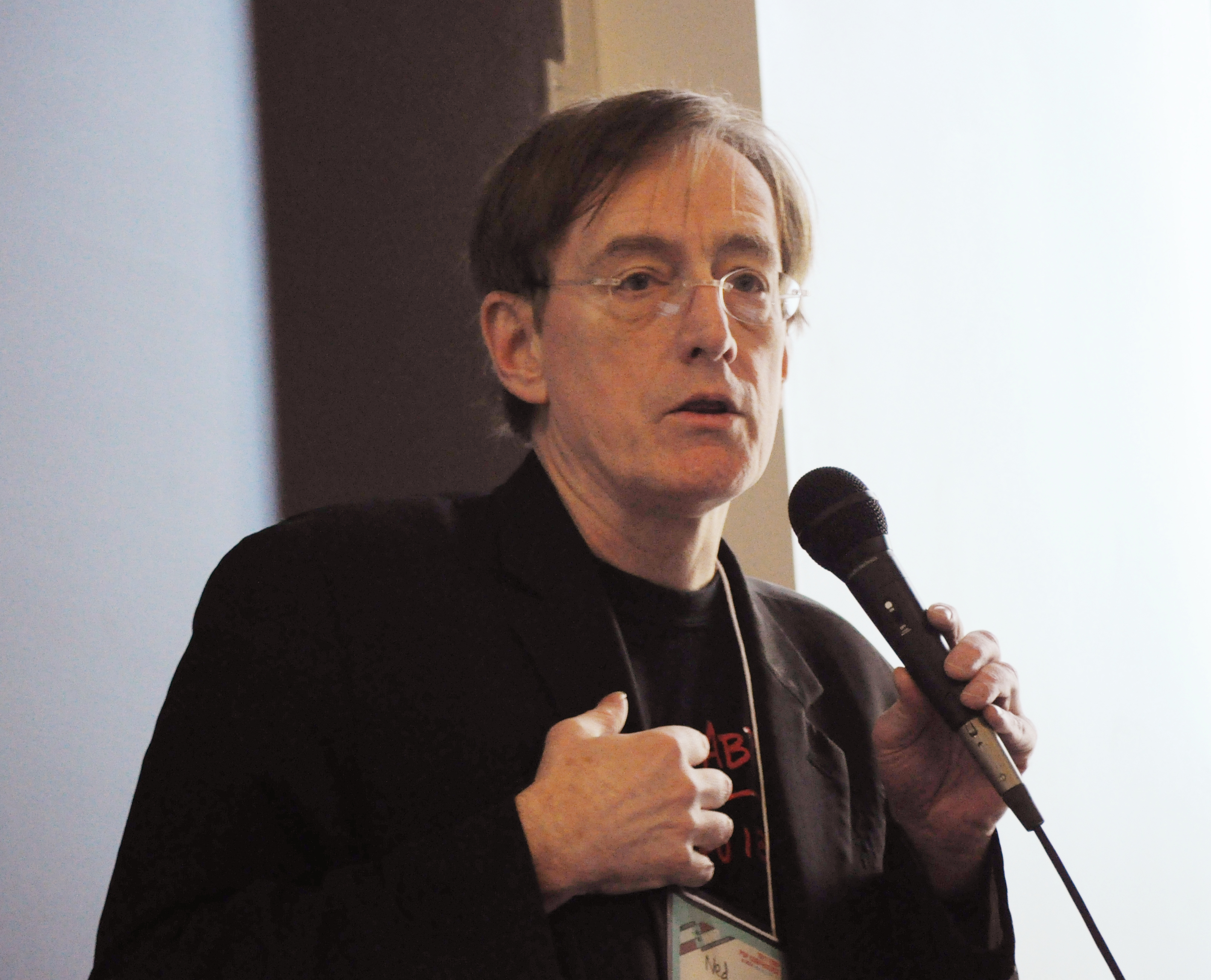
Ned Sublette, 2011

Ned Sublette (born 1951) is an American composer, musician, record producer, musicologist, historian, and author. Sublette studied Spanish Classical Guitar with Hector Garcia at the University of New Mexico and with Emilio Pujol in Spain. He studied composition with Kenneth Gaburo at the University of California, San Diego. He grew up in Portales, New Mexico, moved to New York City in 1976, and has worked with John Cage, LaMonte Young, Glenn Branca, David Van Tieghem, Peter Gordon, and Pauline Oliveros.

== Music performance ==
As a performer, Sublette is probably best known for fusing country-western and Afro-Caribbean styles including salsa, cumbia and rumba, as reflected on the 1999 album "Cowboy Rumba", as well as his 2012 second album Kiss You Down South. He is also a leading scholar of Cuban music. His label Qbadisc releases Cuban music in the United States and he has released music by Latin musicians including Ritmo Oriental and Issac Delgado and has co-produced Public Radio International's "Afropop Worldwide" show.

During the 1980s, he led the Ned Sublette Band, which played country with Cuban stylings. His "Cowboy Rumba" reached number one on World Music Charts Europe during December, 1999. Sublette also performed an experimental radio "mash-up" in 1984 for the "Art on the Beach" series and performs in the opera Agamemnon (1993) with singers Vera Beren and Arto Lindsay. In 2006, Willie Nelson released Sublette's song "Cowboys Are Frequently, Secretly Fond of Each Other" in the wake of the success of Brokeback Mountain.

== Writing ==
His book on Cuban music, Cuba and Its Music: From the First Drums to the Mambo (ISBN 1-55652-516-8) was published in 2004. The World That Made New Orleans: From Spanish Silver to Congo Square, (ISBN 9781556527302) was published in 2008 by Lawrence Hill Books. The Year Before the Flood: A Story of New Orleans (ISBN 9781556528248) published in 2009 by Lawrence Hill Books continues the history of New Orleans cultures and music.

== Awards ==
Sublette is a 2005 Guggenheim Fellow. In 2012 he was a Knight-Luce Fellow for Reporting on Global Religion at the University of Southern California. He did research in Angola, which resulted in a four-episode Hip Deep Angola radio series, produced for the public radio program Afropop Worldwide.

== Other works ==
Sublette starred in Vidas Perfectas, a Spanish-language version of Robert Ashley's 1983 "television opera" Perfect Lives, which premiered on stage at Irondale Theater, Brooklyn in December 2011, and which was to be shot for television in 2012.

In October 2015, Sublette and his wife Constance published The American Slave Coast: A History of the Slave-Breeding Industry (ISBN 978-1-61374-820-6), a comprehensive history of slave trading in the southern colonies and states.

== Discography ==
- Western Classics, as Ned Sublette and the Southwesterners (Lovely Music, 1980)
- Ships at Sea, Sailors and Shoes (Excellent, 1993)
- Monsters from the Deep (Excellent, 1997)
- Cowboy Rumba (Palm Pictures, 1999)
- Kiss You Down South (Postmambo, 2012)
