= Get Loose Crew =

Canadian hip-hop group

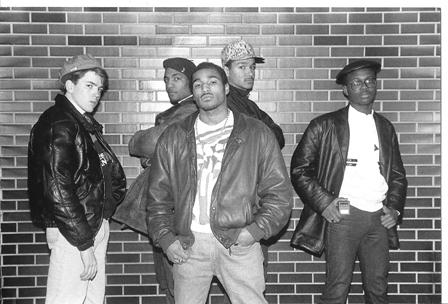
- From left to right: MC Shadow (left), S-Blank (producer back left), MC B (center front), DJ Jel (back right), Mix-Master Len (right) in winter 1987

Background information
- Origin: Toronto, Canada
- Genres: Hip hop; rap
- Years active: 1986–1989
- Label: East Park Productions
- Spinoffs: Self-Defence, Just ME, B-Kool, Carlito
- Past members: Chris (DJ JEL, GotRocks) Jackson, Len (Mix-Master Len) Grant-Stuart, Kory (MC Shadow) Neely and Carl (MC B, B-Kool, Carlito) Badwa
- Website: getloosecrew.com

The Get Loose Crew was a Toronto-based Canadian hip hop group active from 1986 to 1989. Formed by Kory "MC Shadow" Neely, Len "Mix-Master Len" Grant-Stuart and Chris "DJ Jel" Jackson - with Carl "MC B" Badwa joining for the 1988 release - the group issued a self-titled EP on their independent record label East Park Productions. National reference works and university sources have highlighted the record’s role in Canadian hip hop and independent distribution. The group became the first Canadian act in the genre to independently finance, produce and secure distribution of an authentic mini-LP for international release. The group did not release a follow-up project, and disbanded in 1990. Member Carl Badwa, MC B, became the first Canadian emcee to win a Juno Award in 1990 for the category R&B/Soul Recording of the Year.

== History ==
=== 1980s ===
The group was originally formed in Toronto by Chris Jackson, and included Kory Neely, and Len Grant-Stuart as a DJ group called "Def Force III”. Neely is described as having written catalogs of songs, performed at the lunch table and dances at their junior high school, and became the group's vocalist as MC Shadow after a performance at an underground impromptu rap battle. In a Breaking Wreckords Radio interview, Jackson said the group's name "morphed from Def Force 3 to Get Loose Crew with 2 DJs and 1 MC. Kinda like Doug E. Fresh and The Get Fresh Crew." In 1986, the group changed their name to Get Loose Crew and recorded their first demo tape, Licence to Slice, on August 15, 1986 which received airplay on Ryerson University's radio station CKLN 88.1 published by the Museum of Canadian Music.

The group created their own independent hip-hop label, East Park Productions, and signed distribution through Electric Distribution, releasing the eight-track Get Loose Crew EP in 1988. They became the first Canadian hip-hop group to record and release an authentic hip-hop mini-album distributed and sold internationally, with the release cited in national and academic sources for its role in early Canadian hip hop and international export. The single “Wannabe” appeared on the CHEER Music Pool’s “Backfield in Motion” urban chart in May 1988.

In June 1988, music journalist Johnbronski Adams profiled the group in Streetsound – Canada's National Dance Music Authority as part of his “CAN-CON: Canadian Rap Update” column. Describing the crew as “four young brothers down to secure a wider berth for hip-hop music in Canada,” the article positioned Get Loose Crew among a small cohort of artists attempting to establish a viable domestic rap market during the genre’s formative years. The feature documented the group’s emphasis on professionalism in live performance and independent production at a time when Canadian hip hop operated largely outside mainstream industry infrastructure.

The Get Loose Crew performed at Toronto’s Concert Hall during the Caribana-week Shock Out ’88 event - an era-defining venue and series for the city’s hip hop community - documented in NOW Magazine's oral history of Concert Hall shows.

=== Post-disbandment ===
DJ Shadow played the Get Loose Crew song "Wannabe" at his "Pushing Buttons" concert Live! In Tune and on Time. The performative opening utilized the lyrics as wordplay among performers DJ Shadow, DJs Chemist and Numark, and was recorded and included in his June 2004 DVD.

Music journalist and interviewer Nardwuar has sought validation of the group's musical accomplishment from other established hip-hop artists during interviews. In a 2008 broadcast with Maestro Fresh Wes, Nardwuar asked if the GLC record was the first one to come out of Canada, and if it was released before he made his own debut. Wes confirmed that the claim was true and acknowledged the accomplishment. Kardinal Offishall also avowed the Get Loose Crew's status in Canadian hip-hop during an interview in 2005 where Nardwuar highlighted their achievements with him.

In 2017, NOW magazine featured a captioned photograph of Nardwuar holding a copy of the album, proclaiming it as "the first Canadian rap record, produced by The Get Loose Crew in 1988."

The Toronto Free Gallery T-Dot Pioneers exhibition in March 2010 explored the history and culture of Toronto hip-hop with a display featuring the Get Loose Crew album and the Juno award won by Badwa under the solo moniker B-Kool with Simply Majestic.

In 2011, the Canadian Broadcasting Company (CBC) held a Hip-Hop Summit as a follow-up to the T-Dot Pioneers Exhibit, and displayed the group's album during the event, with a brief tribute to the group by summit host and artist Buck 65 during the closing show.

BlogTo’s article "10 most collectible Toronto albums of all time" gave the Get Loose Crew's album an honorable mention, reporting that it was the first Canadian independent rap release to achieve international sales, and featured MC Shadow, the first Canadian white rapper to be recorded, making him second only to the Beastie Boys internationally.

The Jackman Humanities Institute at the University of Toronto conducted the first-ever academic study in Canada on the history of Toronto hip-hop in 2020. The research project focused on tracing the development of Toronto hip-hop and the challenges faced by practitioners and culture industry professionals from 1985 to 2020. A course called "Hip-Hop Culture" explores both historical and modern contexts. Dr. Francesca D'Amico-Cuthbert, a post-doctoral fellow at the Jackman Humanities Institute, documented the historical relevance of hip-hop in Canada and proclaimed the Get Loose Crew as "prominent members of Toronto's Hip Hop history and the history of Canada's culture industries."

In 2021, the Get Loose Crew was inducted into the Museum of Canadian Music, their contribution to hip-hop as Canadian music artists documented by author and movie director Adam P. Cray and published by the MOMC. In September 2023, the University of Toronto's Hart House exhibited "The First 50 - Toronto's Hip Hop Architects." recognizing 50 influential figures who built Toronto's hip hop scene, including the Get Loose Crew on the exhibition poster.

In 2024 the group were included in "A Great Day in Toronto Hip Hop", a black-and-white photograph of 103 key players from the Canadian hip hop scene in Toronto, taken by Patrick Nichols for the Art Gallery of Ontario on August 14, 2024. In reverence of the iconic 1958 Art Kane photo "A Great Day in Harlem" and the 1998 Gordon Parks photo "A Great Day in Hip Hop", "A Great Day in Toronto Hip Hop" features a collective likeness of MCs, DJs, break-dancers, graffiti artists, producers, promoters, designers and media personalities - together representing three-generations of hip hop culture in Canada - standing on the steps of the Liberty Grand Entertainment Complex.

== Discography ==
=== Mini-LP ===
Year	Title	Label	Format	Notes
1988	Get Loose Crew	East Park Productions	Mini-LP	Debut and only commercial release by the group; independently financed and distributed internationally.

=== Demos ===
Year	Title	Format	Notes
1986	Licence to Slice	Demo cassette	First studio demo, recorded August 15, 1986 and aired on CKLN 88.1 FM via Ron Nelson’s Saturday afternoon program.

== Chart performance ==
The single "Wannabe" from the group's 1988 mini-LP charted on the CHEER Music Pool's “Backfield in Motion” urban chart, reaching the No. 5 position in May 1988.

Chart performance for "Wannabe"
Chart (1988)	Peak position
CHEER Music Pool – Backfield in Motion (Canada)	5

== Legacy and Passing ==
The Get Loose Crew remain recognized as one of the earliest hip-hop groups to emerge from Toronto, noted in national and academic sources for their role in bringing the city’s rap scene onto broader platforms in the late 1980s. Their 1988 appearance on CBC’s Switchback provided early national television exposure, and the group’s self-titled EP has since been cited by Canadian music historians and university exhibitions as an important early document of hip hop’s development in Canada.

Len Grant-Stuart, known professionally as Mix-Master Len, continued to be acknowledged for his work as one of Toronto’s foundational hip-hop DJs long after the group disbanded. His passing in October 2019 was noted by several Canadian music history archives, including the Museum of Canadian Music and CitizenFreak, which document his role in shaping the sound and identity of the group.
