= Built to Last (Maestro album) =

Studio album by Maestro
- Released: December 8, 1998 (Canada)
- Recorded: 1997–1998
- Studios: Phase One (Scarborough, Ontario)
- Genre: Canadian hip-hop
- Length: 64:31
- Label: Attic
- Producers: 2Rude; Scam; Kwajo Cinqo; DRK; Jay Rome

Maestro chronology
Naaah, Dis Kid Can't Be from Canada?!! (1994)	Built to Last (1998)	Ever Since (2000)

Singles from Built to Last
- 1. "Stick to Your Vision" Released: 1998; 2. "416/905 (T.O. Party Anthem)" Released: 1999

Built to Last is the fifth studio album by Canadian rapper Maestro, released December 8, 1998, on Attic Records. It was his first album released exclusively in Canada. Before its release, he shortened his alias Maestro Fresh-Wes to simply "Maestro". Singles from the album include "Stick to Your Vision" and "416/905 (T.O. Party Anthem)". It was nominated for Best Rap Recording at the 1999 Juno Awards.

== Background ==
After living in Brooklyn, New York, for most of the 1990s, Maestro moved back to Toronto in 1997. Although his attempt at commercial success in the U.S. was a failure, he worked on a comeback album with local hip-hop and R&B artists. The first single, "Stick to Your Vision", became Maestro's biggest hit since "Let Your Backbone Slide" was released nine years prior. It reached the top 20 on the Canadian Singles Chart.

== Track listing ==
No.	Title	Writer(s)	Producer	Length
1.	"Foundation/Intro" (featuring Michie Mee)	Richard Coombs	2Rude	1:19
2.	"Stick to Your Vision"	Wesley Williams; Randy Bachman; Burton Cummings	2Rude	4:48
3.	"Built to Last"	Williams; Davin Bujalski	Scam	4:11
4.	"Still in da Game" (featuring Snow)	Williams; Darrin O'Brien; Coombs	2Rude	3:50
5.	"Clap Ya Handz/Turn It Out (Part I)"	Williams; Bujalski; Chuck Mangione	Scam	4:00
6.	"G.O.D. We Tru$t"	Williams; Bujalski	Scam	4:11
7.	"Quintessential" (featuring Choclair, Black-I and In Essence)	Williams; Kareem Blake; Raymond Wookwood; Bujalski	Scam	3:57
8.	"The Visine"	Williams; Bujalski	Scam	2:54
9.	"Hard Cranberry" (featuring Glenn Lewis)	Williams; Coombs	2Rude	3:44
10.	"Holy Water" (featuring Ghetto Concept)	Williams; Kwajo Boateng; Lowell Frazier	Kwajo Cinqo	3:07
11.	"416/905 (T.O. Party Anthem)" (featuring Latoya and Miranda)	Williams; Coombs	2Rude	5:05
12.	"Krazy" (featuring Carla Marshall and Jason Simmons)	Williams; Carla Marshal; Derek Palmer	DRK	3:30
13.	"Verbal Exodus"	Williams; Bujalski	Scam	3:10
14.	"Clap Ya Handz/Turn It Out (Part II)" (featuring Stone Pöet)	Williams; David Carty; Bujalski; Mangione	Scam	3:52
15.	"Trigonometry"	Williams; Bujalski	Scam	3:56
16.	"We Got It Sewn" (featuring Jason Simmons)	Williams; Jerome Kanhai	Jay Rome	4:11
17.	"Make the City Stand Still" (featuring Wade O. Brown)	Williams; Boateng; Frazier	Cinqo	4:46

Sample credits

- "Stick to Your Vision" – Contains a sample of "These Eyes" by the Guess Who
- "Built to Last" – Contains a sample of "Crazy World" by Ghetto Concept
- "Clap Ya Handz/Turn It Out (Parts I and II)" – Contain a sample of "Hide and Seek" by Chuck Mangione
- "The Visine" – Contains samples of "Boiling Point" by Concrete Mob and "No Lawz" by Black-I
- "Verbal Exodus" – Contains a sample of "Emcee" by Thrust

== Personnel ==
Credits adapted from the album's liner notes.

- Billy Alexander – keyboards (7, 16)
- Nick Blagona – mastering
- Alun Davies – bass (1, 2, 4, 11)
- DJ Grouch – turntables (3, 8, 13)
- James McCollum – guitar (2, 11)
- Scam – turntables (6)
- Sonia – violin (2)

== Chart positions ==
Singles

Year	Single	Peak position	
Year	Single	Canadian Singles Chart	RPM Singles Chart
1998	"Stick to Your Vision"	13	32
1999	"416/905 (T.O. Party Anthem)"	—	27
