= A Great Day in Toronto Hip Hop =

2024 photograph by Patrick Nichols, inspired by Art Kane

A Great Day in Toronto Hip Hop is a black-and-white photograph of 103 key players from the Canadian hip hop scene in Toronto, taken by photographer Patrick Nichols for the Art Gallery of Ontario on August 14, 2024. Echoing inspirational notes of the iconic 1958 Art Kane photo "A Great Day in Harlem" and the 1998 Gordon Parks photo "A Great Day in Hip Hop", "A Great Day in Toronto Hip Hop" features a collective likeness of MCs, DJs, break-dancers, graffiti artists, producers, promoters, designers and media personalities -- together representing three-generations of Hip Hop culture in Canada -- grouped standing on the steps of the Liberty Grand Entertainment Complex. The image was captured with a Phase One digital camera, shortly after noon.

== Subjects featured in the photograph ==
- Jelleestone
- Eyes (BrassTacks), aka Tar Baby God
- Diamond X
- Infinite
- Red Ants
- Kane
- Ron Nelson (DJ)
- Paul Pitter
- King Lou Dream Warriors (band)
- Terry "Top Gun" Headley
- Precious Headley
- Jerome Cummings (The 5 Aces)
- Bobby Spinner Martin
- Tara Chase
- Motion
- Lady P
- Michie Mee
- Freddy "Freeze" Lopez (Wildstyle Crew)
- Wade Bipatnath (Wildstyle Crew)
- Lindon "Chico" Pincay (Wildstyle Crew)
- Nigel B (Wild Style Crew)
- Ford Medina
- DJ Cartel
- Cooley the Kid
- Capital Q (Dream Warriors (band))
- Christopher Lee Clements
- Solitair
- Gary McCalla (The 5 Aces)
- David Cropper
- Eugene Tam (Play De Record)
- Rohan Campbell (The 5 Aces)
- B-Kool (aka Don Carlito)
- Ebonnie Rowe
- Jason Cameron (The 5 Aces)
- Snow (musician)
- DJ Jel (Get Loose Crew)
- Toney Duncan (Sunshine Sound Crew)
- Julian Arthur (Groove-A-Lot Records)
- JC Sunshine (Sunshine Sound Crew)
- 2Rude
- Paul Pickering
- DJ MasterMind
- Saukrates
- YLook
- Dolo Ghetto Concept
- David Strickland (music producer)
- Jeff "J-Spade" Duke (Citizen Kane (band)), aka Crazy Roc (Graffiti Knights)
- Chase Parsons
- Michele Geister (RapCity, MuchMusic creator/producer)
- D.nd (Brass Tacks)
- Mathematik
- Steel (Down ta Erf)
- Xentury
- Master T
- J Rebel (Supernaturalz)
- William Deniro (Code Blue)
- Lex Leosis (The Sorority (rap group)
- Alison Duke (filmmaker)
- pHonenix Pagliacci
- Keysha Freshh
- Blackjack aka Stadic (Concrete Mobb)
- David "Click" Cox
- Kwame Mason
- Chico Umengam
- Mark Stoddart
- MC Shadow (Get Loose Crew)
- DJ Power
- MC Pin (of Organized Rhyme)
- Rupert Gayle (Beat Factory)
- Alex Jr. Miller
- DJ Mercilless (It's Called Life
- KDB (Babylon Warchild and Crooks of Da Round Table)
- DJ Starting From Scratch
- Junior Lewis (Monica's Beauty Supply)
- Adam Bomb
- Tanya Mullings
- Addi "Mindbender" Stewart
- DJ Mo Betta
- Adrian Aitcheson (Too Black Guys)
- Big Sproxx
- Barry Boothe (TKO Sounds)
- Malichi Male
- Craig "Big C" Mannix
- Sady Ducros (The Graffiti Knights)
- Enza Ruscillo
- Styles (Intrikit)
- Tona
- Choclair
- JellyTooFly
- Eternia (rapper)
- Haviah Mighty
- Thrust (rapper)
- Dan-e-o
- Jemeni
- Jimmy Prime
- DJ MelBoogie
- Garie Adamson (100 Miles)
- Gee Wonder
- Robert Osbourne (Too Black Guys)
- Maurice Davis
- Harv Glazer
- Eldon Mascoll (Phat TV)
