= The Black Tie Affair =

Studio album by Maestro Fresh-Wes
- Released: 1991
- Recorded: 1990–1991
- Genre: Canadian hip-hop
- Length: 51:46
- Label: Attic/LMR
- Producers: Maestro Fresh-Wes, Peter & Anthony Davis, K-Cut, Sir Scratch

Maestro Fresh-Wes chronology
Symphony in Effect (1989)	The Black Tie Affair (1991)	Maestro Zone (1992)

Singles from The Black Tie Affair
- 1. "Conductin' Thangs" Released: 1991; 2. "Nothin' at All" Released: 1991

The Black Tie Affair is the second studio album by Canadian rapper Maestro Fresh-Wes, released in 1991 on Attic/LMR Records. The singles from the album include "Nothin' at All" and "Conductin' Thangs", the latter which reached No. 1 on the RPM Cancon chart. The single was also nominated for Rap Recording of the Year at the 1992 Juno Awards. It was produced mostly by Main Source member K-Cut.

== Background ==
Following the success of his debut album, Symphony in Effect, Maestro took it upon himself to be a role model, by delivering a more professional and socially conscious effort on his second release. In particular, the songs "Nothin' at All", "Poetry Is Black", "Watchin' Zeros Grow", and "The Black Tie Affair" showcase his conscious lyrics. Maestro used "Nothin' at All" as a way to acknowledge the achievements of prominent Black Canadians, mentioning Egerton Marcus, Ben Johnson, Lennox Lewis, Oscar Peterson, and Salome Bey in the third verse, while criticizing "race scientist" Jean Philippe Rushton in the first verse.

== Reception ==
Professional ratings
Review scores
Source	Rating
Calgary Herald	C−
RapReviews	8/10

In Canada, the album was certified gold with over 50,000 copies sold. The Toronto Star noted the "strong range of musical styles that includes ska and soul, as well as the Maestro's best lyrics yet." The Calgary Herald opined that Wes's "main flaw is letting his mouth wander aimlessly when his artistic inspiration fails."

RapReviews gave it an 8/10 rating, calling Maestro "conscious in the very sense of the word," also stating "the result is an album that reflects both the era's climate and the rapper's personal situation." The song "Nothin' at All" was praised for being "both accusatory and motivational."

== Track listing ==
#	Title	Producer(s)	Featured guest(s)	Length
1.	"Hors d'Oeuvres"	Peter & Anthony Davis, Maestro Fresh-Wes		0:48
2.	"On the Jazz Tip"	K-Cut		3:44
3.	"Conductin' Thangs"	K-Cut	Christine Hamilton, Dawn Cumberbatch, Simone Denny	4:36
4.	"Watchin' Zeroes Grow"	Peter & Anthony Davis, Maestro Fresh-Wes		5:23
5.	"Private Symphony (Remix)"	Sir Scratch, K-Cut	Carlos Morgan, Dex Danclair, Steve Easton, Tyrone Gabriel, Washington Savage	5:05
6.	"Poetry Is Black"	K-Cut		4:13
7.	"The Black Tie Affair"	K-Cut		4:30
8.	"V.I.P.'s Only"	K-Cut	K-4CE	3:52
9.	"L.T.D. Makes a Toast"	K-Cut		1:49
10.	"The Maestro Zone"	K-Cut		5:15
11.	"Nothin' at All"	Peter & Anthony Davis, Maestro Fresh-Wes	George Banton	5:01
12.	"Pass the Champagne"	Peter & Anthony Davis, Maestro Fresh-Wes	Farley Flex, K-Skam, Spark, the Special Blend, Thrust	4:55
13.	"An After Dinner Mint"	Peter & Anthony Davis, Maestro Fresh-Wes		1:40
14.	"Care for a Night Cap?"	Peter & Anthony Davis, Maestro Fresh-Wes		1:08

== Samples ==
- "Poetry Is Black" – Contains a sample of "Exhibit A" by Boogie Down Productions
- "V.I.P.'s Only" – Contains a sample of "Cold Feet" by Albert King
- "Watchin' Zeroes Grow" – Contains a sample of "Flat Backing" by Blue Mitchell
- "The Black Tie Affair" – Contains a sample of "Sunshine Alley" by Stanley Turrentine
- "The Maestro Zone" – Contains a sample of "Wanoah" by Black Heat
- "Conductin Thangs" – Contains a sample of "Al Capone" by Prince Buster

== Chart positions ==
Album

Chart (1991)	Peak position
Canadian RPM Albums Chart	20

Singles

Year	Single	Peak position
Year	Single	RPM Singles Chart
1991	"Conductin' Thangs"	42

== Personnel ==
- Dawn Cumberbatch – Vocals
- Anthony Davis – Producer
- Peter Davis – Producer
- Chris Gehringer – Mastering
- Maestro Fresh-Wes – Performer
- Carlos Morgan – Vocals
- Anton Pukshansky – Keyboards, mixing
- Washington Savage – Vocals
- Lascelles Stephens – Vocal arrangement
- Rob White – Assistant engineer
