= Symphony in Effect =

Studio album by Maestro Fresh-Wes
- Released: 1989
- Recorded: 1988–1989
- Genres: Canadian hip-hop, party rap
- Label: Attic/LMR
- Producers: Peter & Anthony Davis, Maximum 60, Stanley McCook

Maestro Fresh-Wes chronology
Symphony in Effect (1989)	The Black Tie Affair (1991)

Singles from Symphony in Effect
- 1. "Let Your Backbone Slide" Released: 1989; 2. "Drop the Needle" Released: 1990

Symphony in Effect is the debut album by Canadian rapper Maestro Fresh-Wes, released in 1989 on Attic/LMR Records. In Canada, the album was certified platinum and was the second-best selling Cancon album in Canada of 1990. It remains one of the best-selling Canadian hip-hop albums of all time. The first single "Let Your Backbone Slide" became the first hit single in Canadian hip-hop history, and appeared on Billboard's Hot Rap Singles chart. A second single, "Drop the Needle", was released in 1990.

== Background ==
After making his radio debut on Toronto's CKLN in 1983, Maestro formed the Vision Crew with Ebony MC. The duo opened for hip-hop acts such as Public Enemy, Ice-T, and Beastie Boys before breaking up in 1987. Originally known as Melody MC, he changed his alias to Maestro Fresh-Wes in 1988 and released the independent demos You Can't Stop Us Now and "I'm Showin' You", which featured his new DJ, LTD. The next year, he performed at the New Music Seminar in New York City, where he walked away with a record deal with independent label LeFrak-Moelis Records (LMR). Later that year, he released Symphony in Effect which included "I'm Showin' You" and "Just Swingin'", featuring his friend Ebony MC. Maestro's manager Farley Flex also made an appearance on the track "LTD's on the Wheel(s) of Fortune".

== Reception ==
Professional ratings
Review scores
Source	Rating
AllMusic	2.5/5 stars
RapReviews	7/10

The album was successful in Canada, with 190,000 copies sold, nearly going double platinum. It peaked at No. 4 on Canada's RPM Albums Chart. The Kingston Whig-Standard determined that "his lyrics are both deft and def, and although they're not without swagger, they're a cut above the usual rap pap." RapReviews gave it a 7/10 rating, stating that "Maestro Fresh-Wes was exactly the right rapper to put Canadian hip-hop on the map." The album won the first Juno Award for Rap Recording of the Year in 1991.

In 2023, the album was the recipient of the Heritage Jury Prize at the 2023 Polaris Music Prize.

== Track listing ==
#	Title	Producer(s)	Featured guest(s)	Length
1.	"Drop the Needle"	Peter & Anthony Davis		5:44
2.	"Untouchable"	Peter & Anthony Davis		3:44
3.	"The Mic's My Piece"	Peter & Anthony Davis		5:58
4.	"LTD's on the Wheel(s) of Fortune"	Peter & Anthony Davis	Farley Flex	4:33
5.	"I'm Showin' You"	Peter & Anthony Davis		4:49
6.	"Let Your Backbone Slide" (Power Mix)	Maximum 60 (Peter & Anthony Davis†)	Engineered & Mixed by Brad Bent, DV Sound	4:58
7.	"Private Symphony"	Maximum 60	Corey "Koko" Whittington	5:40
8.	"Just Swingin'"	Peter & Anthony Davis	Ebony MC	5:28
9.	"The Maestro"	Peter & Anthony Davis		3:47
10.	"Tear It Up"	Stanley McCook		2:22
11.	"Fortissimo"	Peter & Anthony Davis		2:31

† Maximum 60 is incorrectly credited as the producer of "Let Your Backbone Slide".

== Samples ==
- "Drop the Needle" – Contains a sample of "Dance Desire" by Haywire
- "The Mic's My Piece – Contains a sample of "The Mexican" by Babe Ruth
- "I'm Showin' You" – Contains samples of "Love Rollercoaster" by Ohio Players and "So Ruff, So Tuff" by Roger Troutman
- "Let Your Backbone Slide" – Contains samples of "The Champ" by the Mohawks, "Funky Drummer" by James Brown, "Set It Off" by Strafe, "La Di Da Di" by Doug E. Fresh and Slick Rick, "One, Two, Three" by the B-Boys, and "Rebel Without a Pause" by Public Enemy
- "The Maestro" – Contains a sample of "Bring It Here" by Wild Sugar
- "Tear It Up" - Contains a sample of "The Lovomaniacs (Sex)" by Boobie Knight & the Universal Lady

== Chart positions ==
Album

Chart (1990)	Peak position
Canadian RPM Albums Chart	4

Singles

Year	Single	Peak position	
Year	Single	Hot Rap Singles	RPM Singles Chart
1990	"Let Your Backbone Slide"	14	10
1990	"Drop the Needle"	—	46
