= Ever Since (Maestro album) =

Studio album by Maestro
- Released: 2000 (Canada)
- Recorded: 1999–2000
- Genre: Canadian hip-hop
- Label: The Song Corporation
- Producers: Tyson Kuteyi, Saukrates, Frankenstein, Jay Rome, Solitair, Kwajo Cinqo, Kardinal Offishall, K-Cut

Maestro chronology
Built to Last (1998)	Ever Since (2000)	Urban Landmark 1989–2005 (2005)

Singles from Ever Since
- 1. "U Got da Best" Released: 2000; 2. "Poppa 'Stro" Released: 2000

Ever Since is the sixth studio album by Canadian rapper Maestro, released in 2000 on The Song Corporation, exclusively in Canada. Singles from the album include "U Got da Best" and "Poppa 'Stro". Another version of Ever Since was released as a double album, featuring a compilation of songs by underground Toronto rappers, known as Maestro Presents Breakin' Hingez: Volume One.

Album Art Photography by Sheinina Raj.

== Background ==
Like his previous album, Maestro worked with a younger generation of Toronto hip-hop artists, including members of the Circle (Kardinal Offishall, Saukrates, Solitair, and Frankenstein). Describing the album as "a brand new book all together," he also stated "The vibe of my music has changed, especially with tracks like Poppa 'Stro and Maestro Glycerine." The song "Perseverance" was inspired by former boxer Rubin "Hurricane" Carter.

== Track listing ==
=== Disc one ===
#	Title	Producer(s)	Featured guest(s)	Length
1.	"Maestro Glycerine"	Tyson Kuteyi		4:29
2.	"Poppa 'Stro"	Saukrates		4:29
3.	"U Got da Best"	Tyson Kuteyi		3:52
4.	"When I Rhyme"	Frankenstein		3:31
5.	"Ever Since"	Jay Rome		4:27
6.	"Bustin' Loose (Remix)"	Tyson Kuteyi	Kardinal Offishall	3:42
7.	"Heatwave"	Solitair		4:34
8.	"Can't U See"	Jay Rome		3:48
9.	"We Came wid It"	Jay Rome	Infinite	3:30
10.	"Saturday Night (Remix)"	Tyson Kuteyi		3:40
11.	"Rizin 2 da Top"	Jay Rome		3:54
12.	"Most Loved/Most Hated"	Jay Rome		3:47
13.	"Perseverance"	Kwajo Cinqo		5:10
14.*	"Bustin' Loose (Original Mix)" (bonus track)	Kardinal Offishall		3:26
15.*	"Saturday Night (Original Mix)" (bonus track)	K-Cut		3:42

=== Disc two ===
Maestro Presents Breakin' Hingez: Volume One

#	Title	Performer(s)	Producer(s)
1.	"T-Dot Anthem"	IRS	IRS
2.	"Battle Me"	Mizza	S. Moore
3.	"Talk That Talk"	Concrete Mob	Scam
4.	"Deliverance"	Citizen Kane	Fin-S
5.	"My Bride"	Garfield	Divine
6.	"The Haters"	Rollo	Philippe LeBlanc
7.	"Place Ya Bets"	Asassini	Agile
8.	"So What"	Motion	Collizhun
9.	"Inside Your Face"	Bishop Brigante	DJ X
10.	"W5H"	DnD	James Stang
11.	"Back2Back"	7 Bills All Stars	Kwajo Cinqo
12.	"Everywhere I Go"	I.N.T.	Bobby Conscious and I.N.T.
