= Dance Dates, California 1958 =

Live album by Duke Ellington
- Released: 1987
- Recorded: March 5, 1958
- Genre: Jazz
- Label: LMR

Duke Ellington chronology
Dance Concerts, California 1958 (1958)	Dance Dates, California 1958 (1987)	Duke Ellington at the Bal Masque (1958)

Dance Dates, California 1958 is the sixth volume of The Private Collection a series documenting recordings made by American pianist, composer and bandleader Duke Ellington for his personal collection which was first publicly released on the LMR label in 1987 and later on the Saja label.

== Reception ==
The AllMusic review by Scott Yanow stated: "Recordings like this one give one a chance to hear how Ellington rearranged tunes to make them sound fresh year after year and sometimes decade after decade".

Professional ratings
Review scores
Source	Rating
AllMusic	4.5/5 stars

== Track listing ==
All compositions by Duke Ellington except as indicated

1. "Such Sweet Thunder" (Ellington, Billy Strayhorn) – 2:41
2. "Blues to Be There" (Ellington, Strayhorn) – 6:59
3. "Juniflip" – 4:05
4. "The Star-Crossed Lovers" (Ellington, Strayhorn) – 4:09
5. "Together" (Lew Brown, Buddy DeSylva, Ray Henderson) – 4:11
6. "Californio Mello" – 3:38
7. "Suburban Beauty" – 3:43
8. "C Jam Blues" (Barney Bigard, Ellington) – 6:33
9. "Blues in Orbit" (Strayhorn) – 5:03
10. "Mood Indigo" (Bigard, Ellington, Irving Mills) – 8:09
11. "Honeysuckle Rose" (Andy Razaf, Fats Waller) – 4:34
12. "Willow Weep for Me" (Ann Ronell) – 3:37
13. "Caravan" (Ellington, Mills, Juan Tizol) – 7:39
14. "Wailing Interval" – 3:39

Recorded at Mather Air Force Base, Sacramento, California, on March 5, 1958.

== Personnel ==
- Duke Ellington – piano
- Shorty Baker, Clark Terry – trumpet
- Ray Nance – trumpet, violin, vocals
- Quentin Jackson, Britt Woodman – trombone
- John Sanders – valve trombone
- Jimmy Hamilton – clarinet, tenor saxophone
- Bill Graham – alto saxophone
- Russell Procope – alto saxophone, clarinet
- Paul Gonsalves – tenor saxophone
- Harry Carney – baritone saxophone, clarinet, bass clarinet
- Jimmy Woode – bass
- Sam Woodyard – drums
- Ossie Bailey – vocals (tracks 4 & 5)
