= Naaah, Dis Kid Can't Be from Canada?!! =

Studio album by Maestro Fresh-Wes
- Released: April 16, 1994
- Recorded: 1992–1994
- Genre: Canadian hip-hop
- Length: 57:19
- Label: Attic/LMR
- Producers: Maestro Fresh-Wes, Showbiz

Maestro Fresh-Wes chronology
Maestro Zone (1992)	Naaah, Dis Kid Can't Be from Canada?!! (1994)	Built to Last (1998)

Singles from Naaah, Dis Kid Can't Be from Canada?!!
- 1. "Fine Tune da Mic" Released: 1993; 2. "Certs wid Out da Retsyn" Released: 1994

Naaah, Dis Kid Can't Be from Canada?!! (stylized as "Naaah, Dis Kid Can't be from Canada?!!") is the fourth studio album by Canadian rapper Maestro Fresh-Wes, released on April 16, 1994, on Attic/LMR Records. Singles from the album include "Fine Tune da Mic" and "Certs wid Out da Retsyn". The album was produced by Maestro, with contributions from D.I.T.C. member Showbiz.

== Reception ==
Professional ratings
Review scores
Source	Rating
RapReviews	8.5/10
The Source	3.5/5 stars

RapReviews praised its underground sound, calling it "anything but a commercial album." Maestro also changed his image to reflect hip-hop fashion in the mid-1990s; "Gone was the tuxedo, replaced by a hoodie."

The album was a commercial failure and after its release, many members of Toronto's hip-hop community began dissing Maestro. However, it was nominated for Best Rap Recording at the 1995 Juno Awards.

== Track listing ==
#	Title	Producer(s)	Featured guest(s)	Length
1.	"I'm Drinkin' Milk Now"	Maestro Fresh-Wes		3:46
2.	"Check My Vernacular"	Maestro Fresh-Wes		3:14
3.	"Pray to da East"	Maestro Fresh-Wes	Percee P	4:37
4.	"Certs wid Out da Retsyn"	Maestro Fresh-Wes		4:07
5.	"Mic Mechanism"	Showbiz		4:13
6.	"Makin' Records"	Maestro Fresh-Wes		4:49
7.	"Fine Tune da Mic"	Showbiz	Showbiz	3:45
8.	"Brown Sugar"	Maestro Fresh-Wes		4:32
9.	"How Many Styles"	Maestro Fresh-Wes		4:36
10.	"Dat's My Nigga!!"	Maestro Fresh-Wes		4:03
11.	"Higher Level"	Maestro Fresh-Wes		3:16
12.	"Bring It On (Remix)"	Showbiz		4:15
13.*	"Make It for the Ruff" (bonus track)	Showbiz		4:26
14.*	"Dat's My Nigga!! (Instrumental)" (bonus track)	Maestro Fresh-Wes		3:40

== Personnel ==
- Alex Armitage – Assistant Engineer
- Reid Butscher – Assistant Engineer
- Chris Conway – Engineer, Mixing
- Chris Gehringer – Mastering
- Graham Kennedy – Photography
- Maestro Fresh-Wes – Producer, Performer
- Liz Mercado – Assistant Engineer
- Anton Pukshansky – Bass, Producer, Engineer, Mixing
- Showbiz – Producer
- W. Williams – Lyricist
- Nicole Willis – Photography
- Dino Zervous – Assistant Engineer
