= Dance Concerts, California 1958 =

Live album by Duke Ellington
- Released: 1987
- Recorded: March 4, 1958
- Genre: Jazz
- Label: LMR

Duke Ellington chronology
Black Brown and Beige (1958)	Dance Concerts, California 1958 (1987)	Dance Dates, California 1958 (1958)

Dance Concerts, California 1958 is the second volume of The Private Collection a series documenting recordings made by American pianist, composer and bandleader Duke Ellington for his personal collection which was first publicly released on the LMR label in 1987 and later on the Saja label.

== Reception ==
The AllMusic reviewer Scott Yanow stated: "The music on this CD sticks to standards (some of which were not usually associated with Duke) and can be thought of as a live version of Indigos... A typically excellent example of 1958 Duke Ellington".

Professional ratings
Review scores
Source	Rating
AllMusic	4/5 stars

== Track listing ==
All compositions by Duke Ellington except as indicated

1. "Main Stem" – 3:26
2. "Dancing in the Dark" (Howard Dietz, Arthur Schwartz) – 4:22
3. "Stompy Jones" – 3:36
4. "Time on My Hands" (Harold Adamson, Mack Gordon, Vincent Youmans) – 4:36
5. "Stompin' at the Savoy" (Benny Goodman, Chick Webb, Edgar Sampson, Andy Razaf) – 5:29
6. "Sophisticated Lady" (Ellington, Irving Mills, Mitchell Parish) – 3:44
7. "Take the 'A' Train" (Billy Strayhorn) – 4:27
8. "All Heart" (Ellington, Strayhorn) – 3:46
9. "Just A-Sittin' and A-Rockin'" (Ellington, Gaines, Strayhorn 4:15
10. "Take the 'A' Train" (Strayhorn) – 3:53
11. "Where or When" (Lorenz Hart, Richard Rodgers) – 4:28
12. "The Mooche" (Ellington, Mills) – 5:42
13. "One O'Clock Jump" (Count Basie) – 6:10
14. "Autumn Leaves" (Joseph Kosma, Jacques Prévert, Johnny Mercer) – 6:47
15. "Oh, Lady Be Good" (George Gershwin, Ira Gershwin) – 5:56
16. "Things Ain't What They Used to Be" (Mercer Ellington) – 1:37

Recorded at Travis Air Force Base, Fairfield, California, on March 4, 1958.

== Personnel ==
- Duke Ellington – piano
- Shorty Baker, Clark Terry – trumpet
- Ray Nance – trumpet, violin, vocals (tracks 9 & 10)
- Quentin Jackson, Britt Woodman – trombone
- John Sanders – valve trombone
- Jimmy Hamilton – clarinet, tenor saxophone
- Bill Graham – alto saxophone
- Russell Procope – alto saxophone, clarinet
- Paul Gonsalves – tenor saxophone
- Harry Carney – baritone saxophone, clarinet, bass clarinet
- Jimmy Woode – bass
- Sam Woodyard – drums
- Ossie Bailey – vocals (track 14)
