= Ever Since =

Ever Since may refer to:

- "Ever Since" (song), a 2002 song by Sayaka
- Ever Since (Lesley Gore album), 2005
- Ever Since (Maestro album), 2000
- Eversince, a 2016 album by Bladee
