= Patrick Nichols =

Jamaican–Canadian photographer, Hip Hop artist and cultural curator (born 1965)

Patrick Nichols (born 1965) is a Jamaican-Canadian photographer, cultural curator and hip-hop pioneer most notably recognized for his iconic 2024 AGO-installation, "A Great Day in Toronto Hip Hop." Regarded as one of "The First 50" Toronto hip-hop architects, he is considered a foremost photographer of the early hip-hop scene in Canada.

== Notable works ==
=== Photography ===
- Patrick Nichols. A Great Day in Toronto Hip Hop, 2024.
- Patrick Nichols. Michie 2K, 2000.
- Dream Warriors by Patrick Nichols, 1996.
- Ghetto Concept by Patrick Nichols, 1994.
- Michie Mee by Patrick Nichols, 1994.
- Ghetto Concept by Patrick Nichols, 1992.
- K-os by Patrick Nichols, 2006
- Mathematik by Patrick Nichols, 2001

=== Exhibitions ===
- 2025: A Great Day in Toronto Hip Hop: A Throwback, Walker Court, Art Gallery of Ontario.
- 2024: The Culture: Hip Hop and Contemporary Art in the 21st Century, Art Gallery of Ontario.
- 2023: The First 50: Toronto's Hip Hop Architects, Hart House, University of Toronto.
- 2023: We do it for the Culture: A Hip Hop at 50 Event Series, Hart House.
- 2018: …Everything Remains Raw: Photographing Toronto’s Hip Hop Culture from Analogue to Digital, McMichael Canadian Art Collection.

=== Television, Radio and Film ===
- Q with Tom Power (2024), CBC-Radio Canada.
- Black Community Mixtapes (2023), CityTV.

=== Music (Album Cover photography) ===
- "Eric Clapton & Friends – The Breeze (An Appreciation Of JJ Cale)" (2014)
- Catherine MacLellan – "Water In The Ground" (2009)
- The John Henrys – "Sweet As The Grain" (2008)
- Keshia Chanté – "Keshia Chante" (2004)
- Ivana Santilli – Corduroy Boogie (2004)
- Ghetto Concept – "7 Bill$ All Stars (Da Album)" (2002)
- Various – Groovessentials (2000)
- Jazmin (2) – Better Be Good (2000)
- Jazmin (2) – Don't Push (1999)
- Madlocks – "Nothing To Lose Much To Gain" (1999)
- Ivana Santilli – "Brown" (1999)
- Maestro – "Built To Last" (1998)
- Ghetto Concept – "Krazy World" (1998)
- Madlocks – "In My Life" (1997)
- Dream Warriors Featuring Beenie Man – Sound Clash (1996)
- Dream Warriors – "Day In Day Out"(1994)
- Split Personality – "I Don't Know "(1993)
- Rupert Gayle – "The Time Is Right" (1993)
- Organized Rhyme – "Huh!? Stiffenin Against The Wall" (1992)
