= Stick to Your Vision =

Single by Maestro

from the album Built to Last
- Released: 1998
- Recorded: 1998 at Metalworks Studios in Mississauga, Ontario
- Genre: Canadian hip hop
- Length: 4:48
- Label: Attic Records
- Songwriter(s): W. Williams, R. Bachman, B. Cummings
- Producer(s): 2Rude

Maestro singles chronology
"Death Ministry" (1996)	"Stick to Your Vision" (1998)	"416/905 (T.O. Party Anthem)" (1999)

"Stick to Your Vision" is the first single from Maestro's fifth album, Built to Last, released in 1998. Produced by 2Rude, the song contains a sample of "These Eyes" by The Guess Who. It became his first song to appear on Canadian charts since "Conductin' Thangs" in 1991.

== Music video ==
The music video was directed by Little X. Most of the video was shot in Toronto's St. James Town neighbourhood, also featuring scenes in a hydro field.

== Track listing ==
=== 12" single ===
A-side

1. "Stick to Your Vision" (Radio Edit)
2. "Stick to Your Vision" (Extended Vision)

B-side

1. "Stick to Your Vision" (The Rudimental Remix) (featuring Glenn Lewis)
2. "Stick to Your Vision" (Acappella)

== Chart positions ==
Chart (1998–1999)	Peak position
Canadian RPM Singles Chart	32
Canadian Singles Chart	13
