= 360° (EP) =

EP by Infinite
- Released: 1998
- Genre: Canadian hip hop
- Label: Lockdown Entertainment
- Producers: K-Cut; Infinite; Cain

Singles from 360°
- 1. "Gotta Get Mine" Released: 1997; 2. "Take a Look" Released: 1999

360° is an EP by Canadian rapper Infinite, released in 1998, by independent label Lockdown Entertainment. The first single, "Gotta Get Mine", was nominated for Best Rap Recording at the 1998 Juno Awards. The music video for the second single, "Take a Look", won Best Rap Video at the 1999 MuchMusic Video Awards.

== Track listing ==
No.	Title	Producer(s)	Length
1.	"360° (Radio Mix)" (featuring Jully Black)	K-Cut	3:49
2.	"Take a Look"	K-Cut	4:06
3.	"Wise Guys"	Infinite; Cain	4:30
4.	"One Day (Radio Mix)"	Infinite; Cain	4:08
5.	"Gotta Get Mine" (featuring Divine Earth Essence)	K-Cut	3:37
6.	"Gotta Get Mine (Extended Mix)" (featuring Divine Earth Essence)	K-Cut	5:20
7.	"360° (Extended Mix)" (featuring Jully Black)	K-Cut	5:12
8.	"Take a Look (Instrumental)"	K-Cut	3:45
9.	"Wise Guys (Instrumental)"	Infinite; Cain	4:31
10.	"One Day (Instrumental)"	Infinite; Cain	4:11
11.	"360° (Instrumental)"	K-Cut	3:29

Samples

- "360°" contains a sample of "I Like" by Guy
- "Take a Look" contains a sample of "The Mornings Come" by Mercy
- "One Day" contains a sample of "Everybody Loves the Sunshine" by Roy Ayers
- "Gotta Get Mine" contains a sample of "Missing You" by Diana Ross
