= East Park Productions =

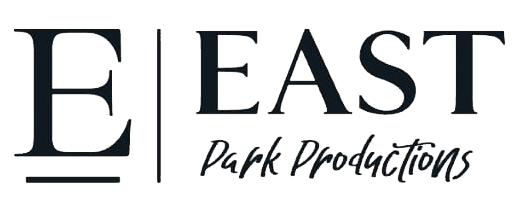
- Founded: 1987
- Founder: Chris Jackson; Kory Neely; Len Grant-Stuart
- Distributor: Electric Distribution
- Genre: Hip-hop
- Country of origin: Canada
- Location: Toronto, Ontario
- Official website: eastparkproductions.ca

East Park Productions is a Canadian independent record label founded in Toronto in 1987 by Chris "DJ Jel" Jackson, Kory "MC Shadow" Neely, and Len "Mix-Master Len" Grant-Stuart. The label is widely cited by national and academic sources as one of the earliest Canadian hip-hop record companies and as the home of the Get Loose Crew, whose 1988 release is recognized as the first Canadian independent hip-hop mini-LP distributed and sold internationally.

In 1988, the Get Loose Crew, with additional member Carl (MC B) Badwa, brought about the first Canadian rap group to record and release an authentic hip-hop mini-album distributed and sold internationally. The label was recognized and credited as generating visibility in and beyond Canada by postdoctoral fellow, Dr. Francesca D’Amico-Cuthbert PhD.

East Park Productions biggest success was the Get Loose Crew, who ranked in the 5th position in May 1988 on the CHEER Backfield in Motion music chart with the song "Wannabe".

Despite success on local urban music charts, the group did not release a follow up project and would disband in 1990. The label released three singles and a video trilogy for MC Shadow in 2015: "Resurrection", "Lost", and "Lullaby of Pain". "Resurrection" was documented in the 5th spot on the Indie Music/College Radio Chart !earshot.

Music journalist Nardwuar has referenced the label's contribution to Canadian hip-hop. In a 2008 interview with Maestro Fresh Wes, Nardwuar asked if their vinyl release was the first in Canada. Wes confirmed its significance and that it predated his own debut. Kardinal Offishall affirmed similarly in a 2005 interview. In 2017, in NOW Magazine, he was featured holding the album, describing it as "the first Canadian rap record, produced by The Get Loose Crew in 1988."

Toronto Free Gallery’s 2010 T-Dot Pioneers exhibition, which explored Toronto's hip-hop history, recognized the album in its display.

Canadian Broadcasting Company's (CBC) 2011 Hip-hop Summit included a tribute to the group by summit host Buck 65 by featuring the record during the closing ceremony.

BlogTo’s 2014 article "10 most collectible Toronto albums of all time" included the Get Loose Crew's album with an honorable mention and reported that it was the first Canadian independent rap release to achieve international sales.

An academic study undertaken by the Jackman Humanities Institute at the University of Toronto introduced a course of study called "Hip-hop Culture." Dr. Francesca D'Amico-Cuthbert PhD identified the Get Loose Crew as "significant figures in Toronto's Hip-Hop history and Canada’s cultural industries." The award-winning historian and post doctoral researcher of American and Canadian hip-hop culture, commented, "the rise of East Park Productions was recognized and credited as generating visibility in and beyond Canada."

In 2021, the Museum of Canadian Music inducted Get Loose Crew, MC Shadow and MC B (aka B Kool) independently as documented by author Adam P. Cray and published by the MOMC.

In September 2023, Hart House at the University of Toronto exhibited "The First 50 - Toronto's Hip Hop Architects," honoring 50 key figures in the city's hip hop scene, including the Get Loose Crew.

== Recognition and coverage ==
East Park Productions and the Get Loose Crew have been the subject of significant coverage in national, academic, and cultural archives documenting early Canadian hip-hop. The label is profiled in The Canadian Encyclopedia, which identifies East Park Productions as the independent imprint behind the first Canadian rap mini-LP to achieve international distribution.

Research published by the University of Toronto’s Hart House and the Jackman Humanities Institute further positions the label as an influential early force in Toronto’s developing hip-hop industry, noting its role in generating visibility for independent Canadian rap during the 1980s.

Cultural historians and journalists have also highlighted the label’s historical significance. Nardwuar the Human Serviette and Maestro Fresh Wes identified the 1988 Get Loose Crew release as a landmark in Canadian rap history, predating nationally recognized commercial recordings.

The Museum of Canadian Music and the Toronto Free Gallery’s “T-Dot Pioneers” exhibition have both archived and publicly exhibited the label’s recordings as foundational works in the country’s early hip-hop culture.

== See also ==
- List of record labels
