= Gatineau (band) =

Canadian hip hop group

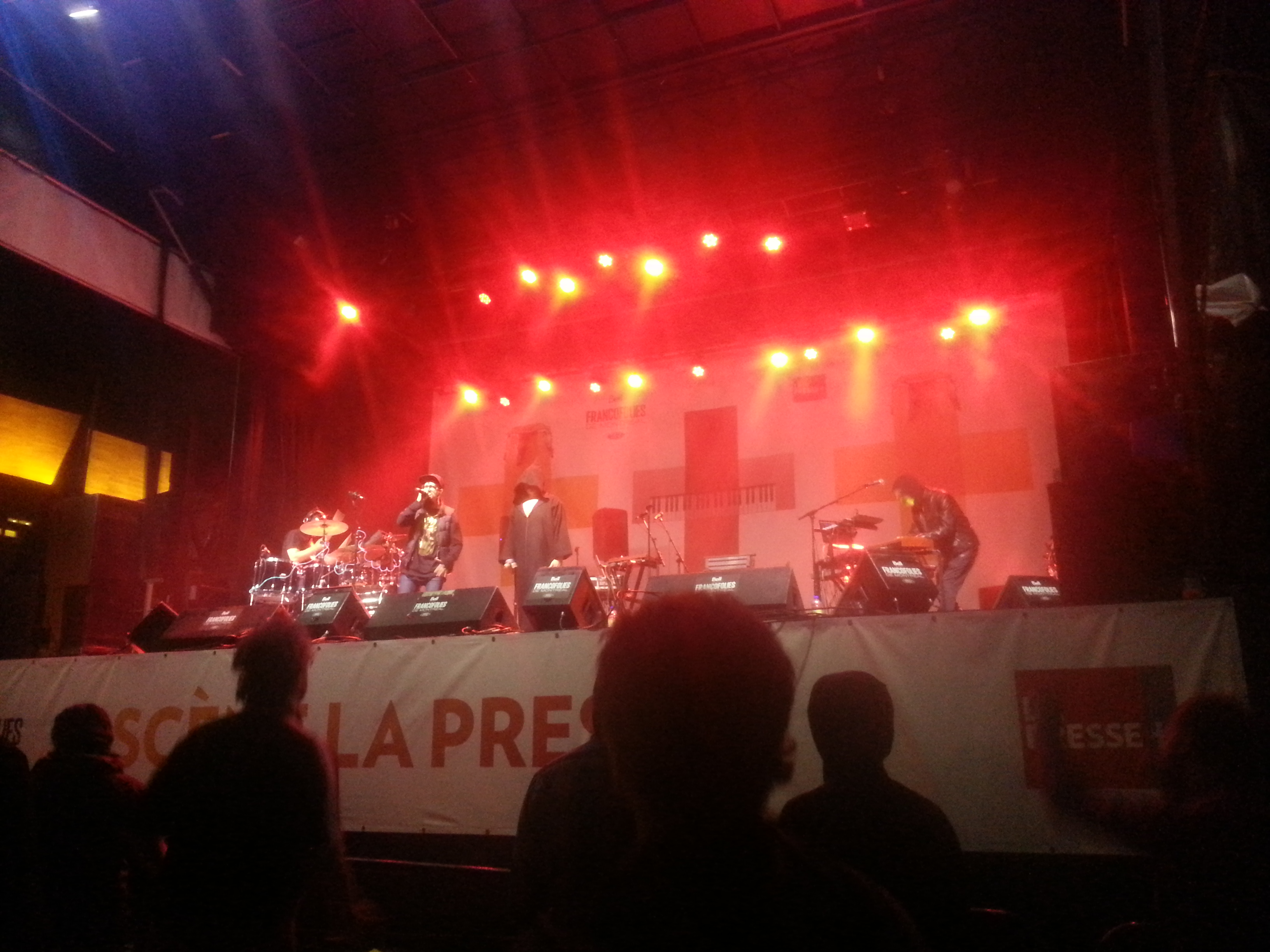
- Rap group Gatineau photographed in Montréal, Québec, Canada during the Francofolies de Montréal 2016

Background information
- Origin: Montreal, Quebec, Canada
- Genres: Canadian hip hop
- Years active: 2004–present
- Labels: La Douve, C4
- Members: Séba; Capt. Keük; Burne MacPhersound; Dom HameLLL
- Website: gatineau.mu

Gatineau is a Canadian francophone hip hop band from Montreal. The band members are Séba, Capt. Keük, Burne MacPhersound and Dom HameLLL.

== History ==
Gatineau was founded in 2004. By 2005, the group was performing in Quebec. Their self-titled debut album was released in 2007; it won the 2008 Félix Award for Best Hip Hop Album. The album was mainly hip hop, but also showed influences of rock, jazz and pop. In 2008, the group toured in France and performed at the Quebec Summer Festival.

Their 2011 album, Karaoké King, showed a shift to a more electronic sound.

== Discography ==
- Lovesong N2 (2004)
- Sur ton visage (2005)
- E.P. L’IntégraLLL (2007)
- Gatineau (2007)
