= Duke Ellington at the Bal Masque =

Studio album by Duke Ellington
- Released: 1958
- Recorded: March 20, 24, 26, 31 & April 1, 1958
- Genre: Jazz
- Label: Columbia

Duke Ellington chronology
Dance Dates, California 1958 (1958)	Duke Ellington at the Bal Masque (1958)	The Cosmic Scene (1958)

Duke Ellington at the Bal Masque is an album by American pianist, composer and bandleader Duke Ellington recorded in 1958 and released on the Columbia label.

== Program ==
Most of the music on Duke Ellington at the Bal Masque consisted of older popular songs and operetta songs, including three songs first published before 1920, and eight songs that were first published between 1922 and 1937. "Satin Doll" (1953), was both the newest composition on the album and the only composition Ellington participated in the composition of. The music for "Satin Doll" was originally credited on the LP label to solely to Ellington. (After the deaths of composer/arranger Billy Strayhorn and Duke Ellington in 1967 and 1974 respectively, a lawsuit, Tempo Music v. Famous Music, resulted in the change of the composer credit to include Billy Strayhorn as co-composer. The Johnny Mercer lyric had not been written in 1958 when Ellington recorded "Satin Doll" for the album.) All of the performances on the album are instrumental only.

The album title alludes to the Bal Masque supper club at Miami Beach's Americana Hotel, where the Ellington band had played a residency in a few years prior to the recording of the album. According to Irving Townsend's liner notes on the original LP release, the Ellington band played mainly for dancers at the Bal Masque, and Ellington decided to include more songs by other composers during the residency than his performances at the time typically featured. Though Townsend's notes state that "this is the recording of that famous affair", the album was in fact recorded in Columbia Records' New York City studios.

== Reception ==
The AllMusic review by Scott Yanow stated: "the music works quite well for Ellington and his all-star orchestra manage to transform what could be a set of tired revival swing into superior dance music and swinging jazz. While certainly not the most essential Ellington record, At the Bal Masque is a surprise success".

Professional ratings
Review scores
Source	Rating
AllMusic	2.5/5 stars

== Track listing ==
1. "Alice Blue Gown" (Harry Tierney, Joseph McCarthy) – 3:02
2. "Who's Afraid of the Big Bad Wolf" (Frank Churchill, Ann Ronell) – 2:53
3. "Got a Date with an Angel" (Jack Waller, Joseph Turnbridge; Sonnie Miller, Clifford Grey) – 2:25
4. "Poor Butterfly" (Raymond Hubbell, John Golden) – 3:40
5. "Satan Takes a Holiday" (Larry Clinton) – 3:15
6. "The Peanut Vendor" (Moisés Simons, Marion Sunshine, Wolfe Gilbert) – 3:33
7. "Satin Doll" (Ellington, Billy Strayhorn, Johnny Mercer) – 3:48
8. "Lady in Red" (Mort Dixon, Allie Wrubel) – 2:49
9. "Indian Love Call" (Rudolf Friml, Herbert Stothart, Oscar Hammerstein II, Otto Harbach) – 3:36
10. "The Donkey Serenade" (Friml, Stothart, George Forrest, Robert Wright) – 2:14
11. "Gypsy Love Song" (Victor Herbert, Harry B. Smith) – 3:54
12. "Laugh, Clown, Laugh" (Ted Fio Rito, Samuel Lewis, Joseph Young) – 3:02

- Recorded at Columbia 30th Street Studios, New York on March 20 (tracks 3, 5 & 12), March 24 (tracks 4 & 6), March 26 (track 9), March 31 (tracks 1, 7, 8 & 10) and April 1 (tracks 2 & 11), 1958.

== Personnel ==
- Duke Ellington – piano
- Cat Anderson, Shorty Baker, Willie Cook, Clark Terry – trumpet
- Ray Nance – trumpet, violin on "Poor Butterfly" and "Gypsy Love Song"
- Quentin Jackson, Britt Woodman – trombone
- John Sanders – valve trombone
- Jimmy Hamilton – clarinet, tenor saxophone
- Johnny Hodges – alto saxophone
- Russell Procope – alto saxophone, clarinet
- Bill Graham – alto saxophone
- Paul Gonsalves – tenor saxophone
- Harry Carney – baritone saxophone
- Jimmy Woode – bass
- Sam Woodyard – drums
