= Make Some Noise (film) =

1994 Canadian short film directed by Andrew Munger

- Directed by: Andrew Munger
- Produced by: Andrew Munger
- Starring: Ghetto Concept; Nu Black Nation; MVP
- Cinematography: Gregory Bennett
- Edited by: Carole Larsen
- Production company: Ultramagnetic
- Release date: September 1994 (TIFF)
- Running time: 57 minutes
- Country: Canada
- Language: English

Make Some Noise is a Canadian short documentary film, written and directed by Andrew Munger and released in 1994. The film is a portrait of the underground Canadian hip hop scene in Toronto, Ontario, focusing in particular on the groups Nu Black Nation, MVP and Ghetto Concept. Other figures appearing in the film include Thrust, Dan-e-o, Da Grassroots, Mos Def and Farley Flex.

The film premiered in the Canadian Perspective program at the 1994 Toronto International Film Festival, where it received an honorable mention from the Best Canadian Short Film award jury. It was subsequently screened at the 1995 Hot Docs Canadian International Film Festival, before going into limited commercial release in April 1995.
