= Maestro Zone =

Studio album by Maestro Fresh Wes
- Released: April 21, 1992
- Recorded: 1990–1992
- Genre: Canadian hip-hop
- Length: 54:05
- Label: Polydor/PolyGram
- Producers: Maestro Fresh Wes, K-Cut, Sir Scratch, DJ L.T.D.

Maestro Fresh Wes chronology
The Black Tie Affair (1991)	Maestro Zone (1992)	Naaah, Dis Kid Can't Be from Canada?!! (1994)

Singles from Maestro Zone
- 1. "Another Funky Break (From My Pap's Crate)" Released: 1992

Maestro Zone is the third studio album by Canadian rapper Maestro Fresh Wes, released April 21, 1992, on Polydor/PolyGram Records. It is a re-packaged version of his previous album, The Black Tie Affair, featuring four new songs. The only single was "Another Funky Break (From My Pap's Crate)". In 1992, just before the album was released, Maestro moved to Brooklyn, New York, in an attempt to expand his fanbase in the US. It was nominated for Best Rap Recording at the 1993 Juno Awards.

== Track listing ==
#	Title	Producer(s)	Featured guest(s)	Length
1.	"Another Funky Break (From My Pap's Crate)"	Maestro Fresh Wes, DJ L.T.D.		3:56
2.	"On the Jazz Tip"	K-Cut		3:31
3.	"Conductin' Thangs"	K-Cut	Simone Denny	4:49
4.	"Watchin' Zeroes Grow"	Maestro Fresh Wes		3:01
5.	"Hittin' the Girlschools"	K-Cut		5:25
6.	"Private Symphony"	Sir Scratch, K-Cut	Carlos Morgan	5:05
7.	"The Maestro Zone"	K-Cut		5:15
8.	"Ebony Mozart"	K-Cut	Thando Hyman	3:53
9.	"V.I.P.'s Only"	K-Cut		3:52
10.	"Poetry Is Black"	K-Cut		4:13
11.	"L.T.D. Makes a Toast"	K-Cut		1:49
12.	"Bring It On"	Maestro Fresh Wes		4:04
13.	"Nothin' at All"	Maestro Fresh Wes		5:01
