= Dubmatique =

French Canadian hip hop group

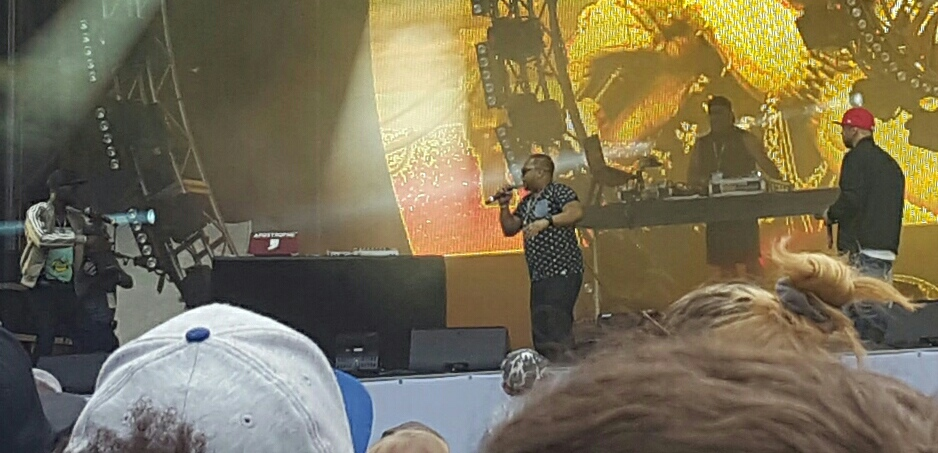
- Dubmatique at FrancoFolies de Montréal, Québec Canada in 2017.

Background information
- Origin: Montreal, Quebec, Canada
- Genre: French Canadian hip hop
- Years active: 1992–present
- Label: Tox Records
- Members: Disoul (Jérôme-Philippe Bélinga); OTMC (Ousmane Traoré)
- Past members: DJ Choice (Alain Benabdallah)

Dubmatique is a French Canadian hip hop group formed in the 1990s in Montreal, Quebec. Groupmates Dj Choice, OTMC, and Jérôme-Philippe are the first French-language hip-hop group from Canada to have a number one hit single on the francophone pop charts. Dubmatique is often regarded as one of the groups that launched French Canadian Hip Hop, and within this category they are the only group to have an album certified Platinum.

== Career ==
=== 1980s to breakthrough: early career and breakthrough ===
In the 1980s, Disoul and OTMC became friends in the country of Senegal. In the early 1990s Disoul moved to Montreal, Quebec, Canada. He joined a hip-hop radio show named Dubmatique, with co-host Cedric it was eventually decided that it would become a group. In the mid-1990s, OTMC came to Canada and joined the group. Shortly after, they invited Dj Choice. In 1994, they made their first appearance by doing a freestyle on the mix-tape Tape 9-Too Leust by Cut Killer.

By 1995, the group were doing shows in local clubs. They participated at the launch of the album Simple et Funky by Alliance Ethnik and the soundtrack for the movie La Haine. They won the award Best Hip Hop Group of the Year at the Gala Mimi. That same summer, they performed at the music festival Les FrancoFolies de Montréal.

In 1997, on the French Canadian market, they released their first album named La force de comprendre. It was soon certified platinum, selling over 125,000 copies. Because of the singles and music videos for "Soul Pleureur", "La force de comprendre", and "Plus rien n'est pareil", they reached the top of the charts on commercial radio stations and TV channels for music videos. The reviews were favourable on both lyrics and the production. The album featured French rappers Menelik and 2 Bal.

Dubmatique went on to perform 150 shows on stages throughout Quebec. At the French Canadian equivalent of the "Grammy Awards" called "Le Gala de L'ADISQ", the band won the Félix Award of "Best Rock Alternative Album" (Their first year at "Le Gala de L'ADISQ", there was no Hip Hop section). They were nominated for Group of the year, and Revelation of the year.

In 1998, the band won the Félix Award for Group of the year, and two more nominations for Show of the year and Best Seller. On the English side of Canada they were nominated for a Juno Award for the Best selling Francophone album.

=== 1999 to 2001: subsequent success ===
Their second album, the self-titled Dubmatique was released in 1999. They launched the singles and music videos of "La vie est si fragile" with the violinist Ashley MacIsaac and Mémoires. The album was certified gold and sold 35,000 copies in the first week. They collaborated with two members of the group IAM: Shurik'n was featured on the song "L'avenir", and Akhenathon remixed the single "La force de comprendre" from the first album. Montreal artists were also featured: El Winner of Latitude Nord, D-Shade of Shades of Culture and Mr. Len. The record was well received and Dubmatique continued to perform around Quebec and fill up large venues. Finally at "Le Gala de L'ADISQ", they won the Félix Award for "Hip Hop Album of the year", were nominated for Group of the year. Additionally at "Le Gala Soba" they won two Sound of Blackness Awards for Best Group of the year, and Best Francophone Hip Hop Group of the year.

Dj Choice did not participate on the production of their third album. Disoul and OTMC worked with Sonny Black, Jaynaz, Ray Ray, and Stéphane Dufour. In 2001 they released the album Influences. "Ragga Dub" and "Sexcite-Moi", a collaboration with the rock singer Éric Lapointe, were chosen as the singles and music videos to launch the album. The group continued to do well on the charts. They won the Félix Award for Best Hip Hop Album of the year. This record is also annotated to be the first appearance by best selling R&B singer Corneille on a professional project.

=== 2004 to present day: solo projects and reunions ===
In 2004, their label Tox released the compilation Mémoires that contained all of their hits. Shortly after, Disoul and OTMC launched solo projects. In 2005, Disoul decided to use his real name, Jérôme-Philippe and released a self-titled album where he mixed rapping and singing. OTMC followed up in 2006 with a Hip Hop album named Sincérité volontaire. Their respective songs would play on the radios throughout Quebec and sales were respectable.

In 2008, a group was created by a fan on Facebook to urge Dubmatique to reunite, and over 50,000 fans joined. This motivated OTMC and Disoul to make an album. In 2009, they launched Trait d'union. Dj Choice participated and produced the song Patience a collaboration with Sir Pathetik, Imposs and John John. Singers Barnev Valsaint, Jennifer Silencieux, and Mike Coriolan also participated. Singles and music videos for "La Vibe" and "Cold World" were released. Les FrancoFolies de Montréal music festival organised their first reunion show.

== Awards ==
1995 Meeting Group of the Year

1997 Gala de l'ADISQ

- Félix Award Win: Best Rock Alternative Album ((at the time the "gala de l'ADISQ" did't have a Hip Hop section))
- Félix Award Nomination: Group of the year
- Félix Award Nomination: Revelation of the year

1998 Gala de l'ADISQ

- Félix Award Win: Group of the year
- Félix Award Nomination:Show of the year by writer-composer-performer
- Félix Award Nomination: Best selling album

1998 Juno Award

- Juno Award Nomination: Best Selling Francophone Album

1998 Much Music Video Awards

- Much Music Video Awards Win: Best French Video

1999 Gala de l'ADISQ

- Félix Award Win: Best Hip Hop Album
- Félix Award Nomination: Group of the year

1999 Soba Gala

- Sound of Blackness Award Win: Best Group of the year
- Sound of Blackness Award Win: Best Francophone Hip Hop Group of the year

2002 Gala de l'ADISQ

- Félix Award Win: Best Hip Hop Album

== Collaborations ==
- Cut Killer "Tape 9-Too Leust" (1994) - Freestyle -
- Cut Killer "Freestyle Canada" (1999) - Freestyle -
- Online "Everest" (2010) - Superstar -

== Discography ==
- 1997: La force de comprendre
- 1998: Dubmatique
- 2001: Influences
- 2009: Trait d'union
