= Let Your Backbone Slide =

Single by Maestro Fresh-Wes

from the album Symphony in Effect
- Released: 1989
- Recorded: 1989
- Genre: Canadian hip hop
- Length: 4:58
- Label: Attic/LMR
- Songwriter: W. Williams
- Producers: Peter & Anthony Davis

Maestro Fresh-Wes singles chronology
"Let Your Backbone Slide" (1989)	"Drop the Needle" (1990)

"Let Your Backbone Slide" is the debut single by Maestro Fresh-Wes, released in 1989 from his first album, Symphony in Effect. In Canada, over 50,000 copies of the single were sold, making Maestro the first Canadian rapper to have a gold single. It also reached #1 on The Record Singles Chart, in April 1990. In the United States, 25,000 copies were sold in its first few weeks of release. It remained the best-selling Canadian hip hop single of all time until 2008, when it was eclipsed by Kardinal Offishall's "Dangerous".

In a 2000 poll conducted by the music magazine Chart, "Let Your Backbone Slide" was voted the 11th greatest Canadian song of all time.

The song contains samples of "The Champ" by The Mohawks, "Funky Drummer" by James Brown, "Set It Off" by Strafe, "La Di Da Di" by Doug E. Fresh and Slick Rick, "One, Two, Three" by The B-Boys and "Rebel Without a Pause" by Public Enemy.

== Music video ==
The music video, directed by Joel Goldberg was shot in Toronto, with most of it taking place in a club. In the video's first few seconds, presenter Dwight Drummond plays the role of a cameraman. It received rotation on MTV and BET.

== Track listing ==
=== 12" single ===
A-side

1. "Let Your Backbone Slide" (Power Mix)
2. "Let Your Backbone Slide" (Bonus Beat)
3. "Let Your Backbone Slide" (A cappella version)

B-side

1. "Let Your Backbone Slide" (Radio Edit)
2. "Let Your Backbone Slide" (Club Mix)

== Chart positions ==
Chart (1990)	Peak position
Canadian RPM Singles Chart	10
Canadian RPM Canadian Content Chart	1
Canadian The Record Singles Chart	1
U.S. Billboard Hot Rap Singles	14

=== Decade-end charts ===
Decade-end charts for "Let Your Backbone Slide"
Chart (1990s)	Position
Canada (Nielsen SoundScan)	100
