= Share (newspaper) =

Canadian newspaper

Share is a Caribbean Canadian and Black Canadian community newspaper, based in Toronto, Ontario. Canada's largest ethnic newspaper, Share has two times the circulation of any other Canadian newspaper serving the same ethnic community. It is distributed free of charge in many locations, particularly in the Greater Toronto Area.

The weekly publication, on quarter-folded, tabloid-sized newsprint, includes news from the Caribbean and Africa, sports, entertainment, business, religion, analysis, and commentaries from its community's point of view.

Arnold Auguste is the newspaper's publisher. He launched the publication in 1978, after spending a number of years working for the older Black community publication Contrast.

In 2000, the company applied for an FM radio license in the round of CRTC hearings that ultimately saw Milestone Radio granted a license to launch CFXJ-FM.
