= Social Deviantz =

Canadian musical group

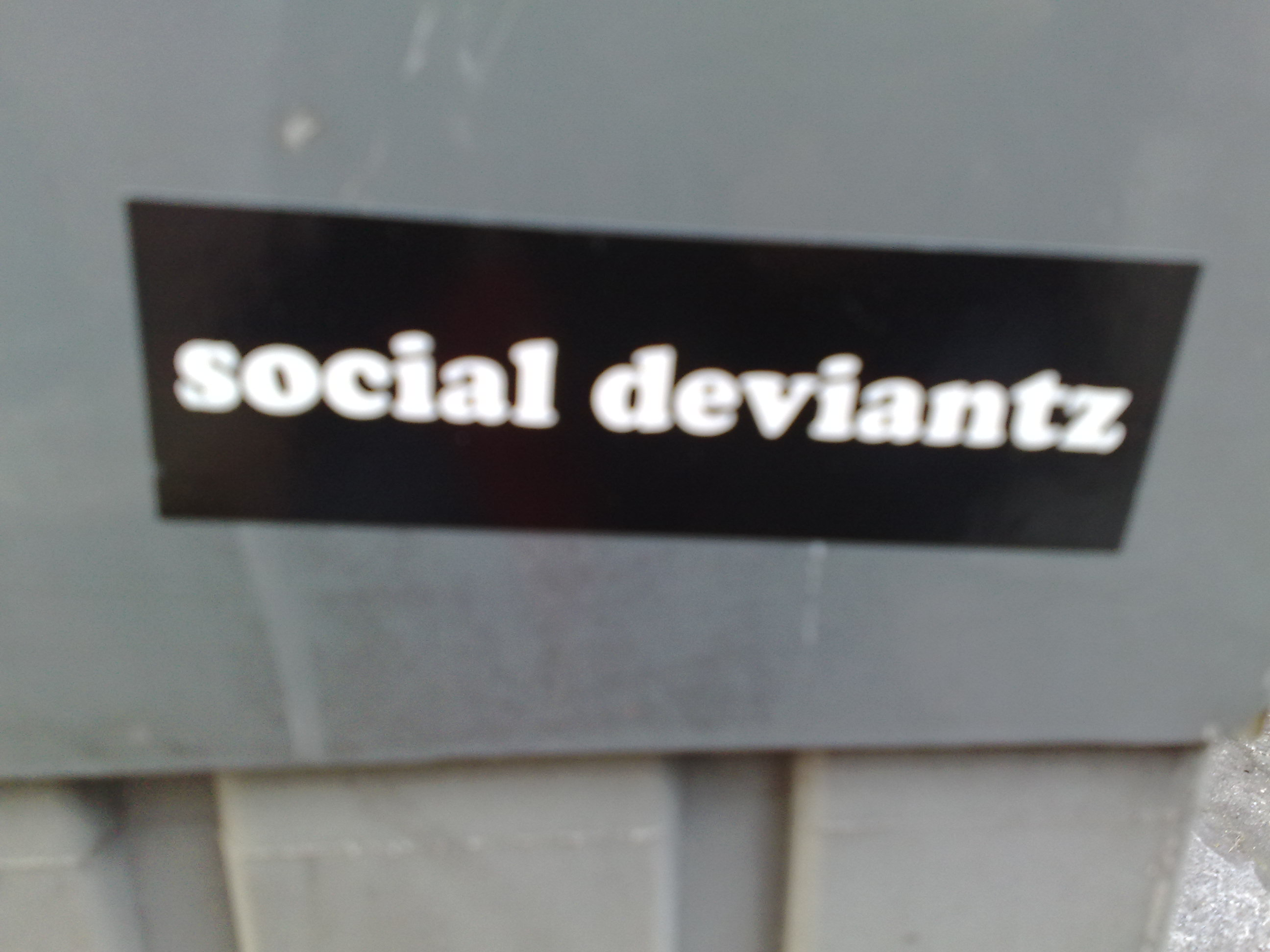

Background information
- Origin: Vancouver, British Columbia, Canada
- Genres: Hip-hop, downtempo, lo-fi, breakbeat
- Years active: 1992-present
- Labels: Sugarshack, Dease
- Members: A-Train; Fatbone; Junya
- Website: https://www.instagram.com/socialdeviantz/?hl=en

Social Deviantz are a Canadian rap trio from Vancouver, British Columbia, currently on indefinite hiatus. The group consists of lyricists; A-Train, Fatbone, and DJ/producer Junya. They are noted for their unique downtempo style of hip hop music, and for being one of the pioneers of the Vancouver rap scene. They are specifically praised for their musical and cultural contributions.

== History ==
Social Deviantz were formed in early 1992 as part of the Sugarshack roster of artists. Their most notable release continues to be their debut full-length album, Essential Mental Nutrients, first distributed in 1996.

As well as two full-length albums, Social Deviantz have released a handful of EPs (including the 2001 vinyl release, Space + Time, issued only in the United States). Two of their singles, "Minimal" and "Lucky 5", received global airplay, including locally on Vancouver's The Beat 94.5 radio station.

Social Deviantz have also appeared on Muchmusic and YTV for interviews.

In 2006, the band released a long-shelved album Bleaky Deky, and in 2009 Spread (a compilation of previously released tracks) was distributed. A video release for "Red Tape", resulted in play on multiple networks including Fuse, MTV, and a spin on Halloween night 2008 on Rage (ABC1 Australia).

In 2019, a vinyl reissue of Essential Mental Nutrients was released by Diggers With Gratitude.

== Members ==
- A-Train - emcee
- Fatbone - emcee
- Junya - DJ/producer

== Discography ==
Release date	Title	Label	Format
1996	Essential Mental Nutrients	Sugarshack	CD, cassette full-length
1996	Sol's Favrit Beat	Sugarshack	12" split w/CIA Kru
1997	ICU - The Death Of Hip Hop	Ill Crew Universal	compilation, includes 'Self-Defeater'
1998	ICU - The Revival	Ill Crew Universal	compilation, includes 'Mstr Bstrd'
1999	Mad Love	Integrity/Sugarshack	compilation, includes 'Minimal'
2000	Minimal	Sugarshack	CD EP
2001	Urbnet.com/Hiphopmix V1	Shoreline	compilation, includes 'Lucky 5'
2001	Space + Time	Sugarshack	12"
2006	Bleaky Deky	Dease	CD full-length
2008	Spread	Dease	CD EP
2008	Red Tape	Dease	CD EP (promotional)
