= Simply Majestic =

Canadian hip-hop and dance music collective

Simply Majestic was a Canadian hip hop and dance music collective, active in the early 1990s. They are most noted for winning the Juno Award for Best R&B/Soul Recording at the Juno Awards of 1991 for their single "Dance to the Music (Work Your Body)". Members of the collective included producer Anthony Bond, rappers B-Kool, Frank Morrell, The Russian Prince and MC A-OK, rap groups Point Blank, Brothers from the Ghetto, the Boys of the Greenhouse and the Forbidden Ones, and rhythm and blues singer Porsha-Lee.

The band signed to Capitol-EMI Canada in 1990 as part of the first significant wave of signings of Canadian hip hop acts, and released the EP Simply Majestic featuring B-Kool that year. The single "Dance to the Music (Work Your Body)" won the Juno for Best R&B/Soul Recording Juno and was a nominated finalist for Rap Recording of the Year, but did not win in that category. B-Kool was also a contributor to Dance Appeal, a supergroup of dance, hip hop, rhythm and blues and reggae musicians who released the one-off single "Can't Repress the Cause" in 1990.

They followed up in 1991 with the album We United to Do Dis. The album again received two Juno Award nominations at the Juno Awards of 1992, in the R&B/Soul category for the single "Destiny" and in the Rap category for the single "Play the Music DJ".

Simply Majestic did not release any further recordings as a collective. B-Kool released the solo album Mellow Madness in 1994, and received another Juno Award nomination for Best Rap Recording at the Juno Awards of 1994 for the single "Got to Get Over".
