= Infinite (rapper) =

- Birth name: Desmond Francis
- Origin: Toronto, Ontario, Canada
- Genres: Canadian hip hop
- Occupation: Rapper
- Years active: 1992–present
- Labels: Lockdown Entertainment

Desmond Francis, better known by his stage name Infinite, is a Canadian rapper, best known for his contributions to the Street Fighter III: 3rd Strike soundtrack, and as a member of hip hop group Ghetto Concept.

Raised in the Rexdale neighbourhood of Toronto, Infinite is the youngest of three brothers. He began his career as a DJ for Ghetto Concept, debuting as a rapper on the group's 1994 single "E-Z on tha Motion", which won a Juno Award for Best Rap Recording. The music video for "E-Z on tha Motion" aired on BET and Video Music Box, gaining the group an American audience. The following year, one of his brothers were murdered, which led to Infinite leaving the group at the height of their success. In 1996, Ghetto Concept released the single "Much Love", which was Infinite's final appearance with the group.

In 1997, Infinite began a solo career and started a record label, Lockdown Entertainment, with his brother Cain. That year, he released his first single "Gotta Get Mine", which earned him a second Juno Award nomination for Best Rap Recording. The single appeared on his 360° EP, released in 1998. The next year, he released his second single "Take a Look"; the music video won two MuchMusic Video Awards for Best Rap Video and Best Independent Video.

In 1999, Infinite was chosen by Capcom to contribute to the soundtrack for the video game Street Fighter III: 3rd Strike, performing voiceovers, as well as three songs.

Infinite had a minor acting role in the 2004 biopic Redemption: The Stan Tookie Williams Story. A year later, Maestro Fresh Wes and Infinite released a hip-hop version of Gowan's hit song "A Criminal Mind".

In 2018, he released the singles "Rida" and "Untold".

== Discography ==
- 360° (1998)
