= Canadian hip-hop =

Music genre

- Stylistic origins: Old-school hip-hop
- Cultural origins: 1979, Toronto, Ontario, Canada
- Typical instruments: DJ equipments; turntables; DJ mixer; music workstation; sampler; sequencer; drum machine; synthesizer

Subgenres
- French Canadian hip-hop; Indigenous hip-hop; Punjabi Canadian hip-hop; Toronto sound

Regional scenes
- Alberta; British Columbia; Manitoba; Nova Scotia; Ontario; Quebec; Saskatchewan

Local scenes
- Calgary; Edmonton; Halifax; Montreal; Ottawa; Regina; Scarborough; Toronto; Vancouver; Winnipeg

Other topics
- List of Canadian hip-hop musicians

The Canadian hip-hop scene was established in the 1980s. Through a variety of factors, it developed much slower than Canada's popular rock music scene, and apart from a short-lived burst of mainstream popularity from 1989 to 1991, it remained largely an underground phenomenon until the early 2000s.

Canada's multicultural and multilingual fabric has given rise to various subgenres, including Indigenous, French, and Punjabi Canadian hip-hop. Also notable is the influence of Caribbean rhythms in creating a sound unique to Toronto.

In the early 1990s, artists like Maestro Fresh-Wes, Main Source, and Dream Warriors were popular in the Canadian hip-hop scene. In 1998, the collaborative single "Northern Touch" brought hip-hop back into the Canadian mainstream. In the 2000s, the best selling Canadian hip-hop artists were Swollen Members and k-os. In the 2010s Canadian hip-hop saw increased mainstream success, led by Drake, and to a lesser extent Belly, Tory Lanez and Nav. Notable artists of the 2020s include bbno$, Backxwash and Freddie Dredd.

== History ==
=== Early 1980s ===
Canada had hip-hop artists right from the early days of the scene—the first known Canadian rap single, Mr. Q's "Ladies' Delight", was released in 1979 just a few weeks after The Sugarhill Gang's historic "Rapper's Delight", and the first French rap single, Lucien Francœur's "Le Rap-à-Billy", was released in 1983. For the most part, however, the infrastructure was not there to get most artists' music to the record-buying public; even "Ladies' Delight" was overlooked by Canadian music historians for many years, instead media and reference works erroneously credited Singing Fools' "The Bum Rap", which was released three years later in 1982, as the first Canadian rap single.

In addition to "Ladies Delight", Mr. Q (Jay McGee) released a handful of other rap singles through the last several months of 1979; one, "Party Rapp", included lyrics about the 1979 Mississauga train derailment. He was also featured on Rap the Night Away, a 1981 album by Bobby Boyer and Demo Cates which has been credited as the first full-length Canadian hip-hop album.

Toronto's CKLN-FM was an early supporter of the genre, with Ron Nelson launching Canada's first hip-hop program, The Fantastic Voyage, in 1983.

=== Late 1980s/early 1990s: The rise of Canadian hip-hop ===
Artists such as B-Kool, Devon, Maestro Fresh-Wes and Dream Warriors did briefly manage to break into the mainstream in the late 1980s and early 1990s. In 1989, Maestro's first single, "Let Your Backbone Slide", was the first Canadian hip-hop single to break into the national Top 40, and the first to make the Billboard charts in the United States. It remained the bestselling Canadian hip-hop single of all time until 2008. Other notable rap singles of this era include Maestro's "Drop the Needle", Devon's "Mr. Metro", Dream Warriors' "My Definition of a Boombastic Jazz Style" and "Wash Your Face in My Sink", Ground Control's "Another Dope Jam", MCJ and Cool G's "No Sex With My Sister" and "So Listen", and Kish's "I Rhyme the World in 80 Days".

The group Get Loose Crew created their own independent hip-hop label, East Park Productions, in 1987 and are credited as generating visibility in and beyond Canada. Signing a distribution deal with Electric Distribution, they brought about the first Canadian rap group to record and release an authentic Hip-Hop mini-album distributed and sold internationally.

In 1988, Michie Mee became the first Canadian rapper to sign a deal with a US record label. This action did not result in significant chart success for her. She has asserted in interviews that the reggae influences on her 1991 debut album Jamaican Funk—Canadian Style were met with resistance from US label executives and radio programmers.

The Toronto/New York-based hip-hop group Main Source released their classic debut album Breaking Atoms in 1991, which featured the debut of a young Nas before his rise in popularity. Rap also began to surface in Canadian mainstream pop in the early 1990s, with rapper Frankie Fudge performing a rap break in Celine Dion's 1990 single "Unison" and female R&B duo Love and Sas rapping in their 1991 single "I Don't Need Yo' Kiss".

An important influence for the development of hip-hop in Toronto was Ron Nelson and his Fantastic Voyage radio show which aired Saturday afternoons on CKLN-FM from 1983 to 1991. Fantastic Voyage was the first exposure many youths had to the hip-hop genre and provided the first airplay for many Toronto artists including Maestro Fresh Wes, Michie Mee, Rumble & Strong, Get Loose Crew, Simply Majestic and the Dream Warriors. Nelson was also an early hip-hop concert promoter, organizing the first major hip-hop concert in Canada at Varsity Stadium in 1987 featuring Run DMC, Public Enemy and EPMD, and provided exposure for local artists at venues such as the Concert Hall, the Spectrum, and the Party Centre. In addition, Nelson helped set up events in Toronto that drew in well-known US hip-hop acts, such as Big Daddy Kane and Run DMC.

The first urban-radio show in British Columbia was Sonic Shocks in 1987, hosted by Bay-Area native DJ Maximus Clean. Vancouver's first all-rap radio show, In Effect, was launched in 1989 by Niel Scobie on CITR-FM.

=== Early to mid-1990s: Fight for recognition ===
In 1990, Denham Jolly's company Milestone Radio applied to the CRTC for an urban music station in Toronto, which would have been the first such station in Canada, but that application was denied in favour of a country music station—which Toronto already had on its radio dial.

The decision was controversial, and hurt the Canadian hip-hop scene considerably. Hip-hop and R&B fans in Toronto relied on Buffalo, New York's WBLK, a US station with no Canadian content responsibilities, while other Canadian cities often had no access to any urban music radio stations at all. After 1992, Michie Mee was the only Canadian rapper to make an appearance on the national pop charts until 1998—and even she didn't accomplish the feat with a hip-hop song, but by partnering with the alternative rock band Raggadeath for 1995's "One Life".

Sol Guy, a hip-hop promoter with Figure IV Entertainment, said in 1999 that

"...after "My Definition", nothing happened for two years. No labels were signing, or trying to sign, anything. Nobody was getting a shot. Radio disappeared with Wes and the Dream Warriors and it still hasn't come back."

A special collaborative single, "Can't Repress the Cause", was released under the name Dance Appeal to advocate for greater inclusion of hip-hop in the mainstream of Canadian music. Participating artists included Devon, Maestro Fresh Wes, Dream Warriors, B-Kool, Michie Mee, Lillian Allen, Eria Fachin, HDV, Dionne, Thando Hyman, Carla Marshall, Messenjah, Jillian Mendez, Lorraine Scott, Lorraine Segato, Self Defense, Leroy Sibbles, Zama and Thyron Lee White.

Ottawa-based hip-hop group Organized Rhyme, which featured a young Tom Green before his rise to fame, had some success on MuchMusic with "Check the O.R." in 1993, but did not receive widespread radio airplay or reach the RPM charts. Maestro Fresh-Wes, who moved to New York City in 1992 and attempted to break into the US market with the albums Maestro Zone and Naaah, Dis Kid Can't Be from Canada?!!, found his career faltering in this era. Snow, who had a number one Billboard hit in 1993 with "Informer", is sometimes mistakenly labelled a rapper, but in fact his style was more accurately described as dancehall, a style of reggae, than as hip-hop.

Many US hip-hop artists were popular in Canada, and Black Canadian musicians such as Infidels, Deborah Cox and The Philosopher Kings had notable successes in the R&B, pop and rock genres; however, even the most prominent Canadian hip-hop acts during this era, including Ghetto Concept, Rascalz, Farm Fresh, TBTBT, Graphidi Logik and Hip Club Groove, struggled to gain any kind of commercial traction. Although Toronto-market radio stations CHOG and CING-FM began to include some Canadian hip-hop songs in their contemporary hit radio formats, the hip-hop audience in the city remained loyal to WBLK—and for most artists the only venues available for reaching an audience anywhere outside of the Greater Toronto Area were campus radio and MuchMusic's RapCity and X-Tendamix.

In 1994, filmmaker Andrew Munger profiled several of Toronto's underground hip-hop musicians, including Ghetto Concept, Dan-e-o, Thrust and Da Grassroots, in his documentary film Make Some Noise.

The genre's underground status began to change in 1996, when the Urban Music Association of Canada was formed to build the domestic and international profile of Canadian urban music. The following year, Dubmatique broke through as the first Quebec rap band to top Canada's francophone pop charts, Montreal alternative rock collective Bran Van 3000 had a hit with the trip hop song "Drinking in L.A.," and some controversy erupted in Toronto when Milestone was again passed over for an urban radio station on its second application. Instead, the CBC was awarded 99.1 to move its existing Radio One station, CBLA, from the AM band—and, ominously, this was believed at the time to be the last available FM frequency in the city. The CRTC decision was not met with as much uproar as there had been in 1990, because the ruling was not seen as much of a shock; indeed, it seemed like a foregone conclusion that the CBC would receive the frequency.

The most notable Canadian hip-hop album during this era, Rap Essentials Volume One, was a compilation which featured the debut singles of both Kardinal Offishall and Choclair.

=== 1998: "Northern Touch" and transformation ===
However, 1998 proved to be a transformative year in the development of Canadian hip-hop, as the Vancouver hip-hop band Rascalz quite unexpectedly found themselves at the centre of a sequence of events which gave Canadian hip-hop an unprecedented level of media attention, leading the Canadian music and broadcasting industries to make a number of structural changes which would ultimately give hip-hop musicians a more stable and commercially visible platform going into the 21st century.

First, Rascalz won the Juno Award for Best Rap Recording for their 1997 album Cash Crop. Because of Canadian hip-hop's lack of commercial visibility, the award was presented during the non-televised portion of the ceremony, along with the technical awards, rather than at the televised main gala. The band had not yet arrived at the ceremony when the award was announced—when they did arrive, they were simply pulled aside and told that they had won the award.

Alleging that racism was a factor in the award's scheduling, the band refused to accept the award. Speaking to the press afterward, the group and their co-manager said that

In view of the lack of real inclusion of black music in this ceremony, this feels like a token gesture towards honoring the real impact of urban music in Canada. Urban music, reggae, R&B, and rap, that's all black music, and it's not represented [at the Junos]. We decided that until it is, we were going to take a stance.

For several weeks, cultural critics and hip-hop musicians debated the issue in the press. In fact, some suggested that the hip-hop award's lack of visibility could be seen as not just a result of Canadian hip-hop's poor commercial performance, but also a contributing factor.

Soon afterward, Rascalz released "Northern Touch", a collaboration with emerging rappers Checkmate, Kardinal Offishall, Thrust and Choclair. Originally recorded in 1997 for a compilation album that fell through and was never released, the band opted to release it as a standalone single in 1998. It became a galvanizing statement of purpose for Canadian hip-hop musicians and beat the odds to become the first Canadian hip-hop hit since 1991. Although the song just barely missed the national Top 40 charts, peaking at number 41 in RPM, it reached the Top 10 in most major markets, and was the first Canadian hip-hop song to reach the Top 100 at all, and the first to garner widespread radio airplay both in Canada and internationally, since 1991.

Maestro Fresh-Wes, now known simply as Maestro, also broke his own hit jinx in 1998, with "Stick to Your Vision"—buoyed, in part, by a Guess Who sample—becoming his first Top 40 hit in seven years. Although he would not actually reach the Top 40 until 2001's "BaKardi Slang", Kardinal Offishall also made his first appearance as a solo artist in RPM's Top 100 in 1998, peaking at number 91 with "On wit da Show". Artists such as Choclair, Jelleestone and Saukrates were also beginning to make waves in the press, as the year's more dramatic events renewed attention on Canadian hip-hop.

As a result of the Rascalz controversy, the Junos moved the Rap award to the main ceremony the following year. It was won by "Northern Touch". The participating artists performed the song live at the ceremony, the first time a hip-hop group had ever performed live on the Juno stage.

At the Juno Awards of 2018, the Northern Touch All-Stars were selected as presenters of the Rap award. Winner Tory Lanez was not in attendance at the ceremony, and after accepting the award on his behalf, the group launched into an a cappella rendition of "Northern Touch" in lieu of the time that would otherwise have been taken by Lanez' acceptance speech. Although presented as an impromptu decision, CARAS president Allan Reid later admitted that he had encouraged the musicians to do it.

=== 2000s: The breakthrough ===
On June 18, 1999, the CBC's Toronto station completed its move to FM. Because the FM frequency offered better broadcast coverage of the region, the CBC found that it was able to surrender two FM repeater transmitters serving communities outside of the city—thus opening two new frequencies in Toronto for license applications. In response, the federal cabinet issued an Order in Council to the CRTC directing it to give precedence to applications that took into account Toronto's cultural and racial diversity, strongly suggesting Milestone or a similar applicant would get a license in the new round of hearings.

On June 16, 2000, the CRTC awarded the 93.5 frequency to Milestone, on the company's third attempt. A competing application for a Black music format on 93.5 from Arnold Auguste, owner of the community newspaper Share, was among the applications denied. The other frequency, 106.5, was awarded to Aboriginal Voices for a station to serve First Nations communities. At the beginning of this same year, the internet became home to Canada's largest rap/hip-hop website publication and community, HipHopCanada.

Also in 2000, the CBC created and aired Drop the Beat, a television drama series about hip-hop music and culture which was billed as one of the first such series in the world. The show starred Merwin Mondesir and Mark Taylor as the hosts of a hip-hop show on a campus radio station; the cast also included Michie Mee, DJ Shamann and Kardinal Offishall. As a tie-in to help promote emerging hip-hop musicians, the series released a soundtrack album in conjunction with the first season, featuring artists such as Maestro Fresh Wes, Infinite, Frankie Ano, Bahamadia, Ja Rule, Black Child, Choclair, Rahzel, Jully Black and Erykah Badu.

Finally, in 2001, CFXJ (Flow 93.5) debuted as Canada's first urban music station. Urban stations quickly followed in several other Canadian cities, as well, and for the first time, Canadian hip-hop artists had a network of radio outlets for their music—as well as numerous record labels committed to rectifying their past lack of interest in the genre. In the 2000s, numerous Canadian hip-hop artists, including Kardinal Offishall, Drake, Classified, k-os, K'naan, Swollen Members, Sweatshop Union, Buck 65, Belly, Moka Only, Shad, Kyprios and Cadence Weapon, emerged as mainstream stars. In 2009, Cadence Weapon was named poet laureate of Edmonton, Alberta.

In addition to terrestrial radio, the national satellite radio networks CBC Radio 3 and Bande à part, which are both dedicated to Canadian independent music of any genre, also include numerous emerging hip-hop artists in their playlists. Bande à part has produced a compilation album of unsigned Quebec hip-hop artists, 93 tours, which it distributed as a free download from its website. Several prominent contemporary hip-hop artists, including Shad, Cadence Weapon, K'naan, Sweatshop Union, Radio Radio and Omnikrom, have in fact risen to prominence through these channels instead of through terrestrial radio.

Apart from a few major stars, however, the hip-hop scene has faced continued struggle. Virtually all of the urban-format radio stations which debuted in the early 2000s, including Flow 93.5, have since shifted from a pure urban format to a rhythmic contemporary format. While the stations still play some hip-hop, they now focus far more on artists who have already established crossover Top 40 appeal—meaning that emerging artists can no longer rely on the stations to help them build their audience. In 2010, further, Milestone announced a deal to sell Flow 93.5 to CHUM Radio, a division of the mainstream media conglomerate CTVglobemedia. However, a new radio station, CKFG-FM, was licensed to Toronto in 2011 to broadcast a broad spectrum of African and Caribbean musical genres, including hip-hop, reggae, soca and rhythm and blues.

Canadian hip-hop musicians have also continued to face obstacles when attempting to break into the American and international markets. Music critics and journalists have sometimes attributed this to the perception, real or imagined, that stereotypes of Canada as a land of igloos and hosers get in the way of Canadian rappers being taken seriously. As early as 1994, noted Canadian hip-hop record producer Derek Brin was telling Billboard that "Americans like something that sounds American. From here, it seems if you don't have that sound, you ain't it."

It wasn't until 2008, when Kardinal Offishall reached number five on the Billboard Hot 100 chart with a collaboration with established US star Akon, "Dangerous", that a Canadian rapper had a major chart hit in the United States. He was shortly followed by Drake, whose 2009 single "Best I Ever Had" reached number two on the Hot 100 and another major international breakthrough came in 2009 when a remixed version of K'naan's single "Wavin' Flag" was announced as the official Coca-Cola theme song of the 2010 FIFA World Cup.

=== 2010s–present: New Toronto sound ===
Toronto-based artist Drake has since dominated the Canadian hip-hop scene and beyond with thirteen albums/mixtapes and playlist peaking at number-one on the US Billboard 200 album chart; Thank Me Later (2010), Take Care (2011), Nothing Was the Same (2013), If You're Reading This It's Too Late (2015), What a Time to Be Alive (2015), Views (2016), More Life (2017), Scorpion (2018), Care Package (2019), Certified Lover Boy (2021), Honestly, Nevermind (2022), Her Loss (2022), For All The Dogs (2023), $ome $exy $ongs 4 U (2025), and Iceman (2026). Drake's 2016 dancehall/afrobeats-infused single "One Dance" is the most successful Canadian hip-hop song of all-time, charting at number-one on the singles charts in 15 different countries, including the US and UK, making it the first Canadian hip-hop single to peak at number-one on the US Billboard Hot 100. Drake had a large impact on Canadian hip-hop, as after the Weeknd was involved in Take Care his popularity rose dramatically.

Numerous other Canadian hip-hop and R&B artists from the Greater Toronto Area, including the Weeknd, PARTYNEXTDOOR, Majid Jordan, Roy Woods, NAV, Dvsn, Killy, 88Glam, Pressa, Honey Cocaine, Eric Reprid, Tory Lanez and NorthSideBenji have also attained wider international prominence in this era. Canadian entertainment company 6ixBuzz has also contributed to the popularity of numerous independently signed Canadian artists predominantly from Toronto. 6ixBuzz showcases Toronto's rap and hip-hop underground, and are recognised for bringing Toronto's hip-hop culture to a global audience. The company founders attribute the success of their online presence to the "lack of voice" of communities surrounding Canadian hip-hop culture. The success of these artists, and the subsequent rise of hip-hop artists in Toronto, was the feature of 2017 documentary 6ix Rising, produced by Noisey.

In 2022, Toronto's two Black music radio formats consolidated into one. The Flow brand created for 93.5 in 2001 moved to CKFG-FM on 98.7 supplanting its original brand G98.7. CFXJ-FM on 93.5 flipped to a general-market adult hits format. Also that year, satellite radio provider SiriusXM Canada launched Mixtape: North, a full-time channel dedicated to Canadian hip-hop and R&B.

Several artists working in Canada achieved international success in Punjabi hip-hop from the 2010s on, including Sidhu Moose Wala and Karan Aujla. At the Juno Awards of 2024, Karan Aujla performed in the national telecast and became the first performer principally in a language other than English to win the Juno Fan Choice Award.

Another rapper who has achieved success in recent years is bbno$, who became the first English-language hip-hop artist to win the Juno Fan Choice Award at the 2025 Juno Awards.

== Punjabi Canadian hip-hop ==
As of 2021, South Asians (7.1 percent) comprise the second largest pan-ethnic group in Canada after Europeans (69.8 percent). One of the major cultural outputs of this community has been hip-hop, performed in both Punjabi and English.

South Asian rapper Ylook was a pioneering artist in Toronto's hip-hop scene, working alongside Kardinal Offishall as part of the influential Circle crew. Other South Asian hip-hop artists such as Nav and AR Paisley have gained wide recognition while rapping in English.

In the 1990s, Jazzy B emerged as an early fusion artist - making Punjabi music with hip-hop influences. In the 2020s Punjabi language hip-hop reached mainstream charts with the success of Canadian artists like Sidhu Moose Wala, AP Dhillon, Gurinder Gill, Karan Aujla, and Shubh, as well as producers such as Gminxr, Byg Byrd, and Ikky, marking the breakthrough of Punjabi-language hip-hop, referred to in the Canadian music industry as Punjabi Wave.

The breakthrough of the genre started with the charting of Sidhu Moose Wala's album PBX 1 on the Billboard Canadian Albums Chart in 2018. In 2023, AP Dhillon became the first Punjabi artist to perform at the Juno Awards. The same year, Warner Music Canada launched 91 North Records, a Canadian label designed to foster and promote emerging South Asian talent. The label’s first release "Making Memories," a collaboration between Karan Aujla and Ikky, debuted at No. 5 on the Billboard Canadian Albums Chart. The following year, Aujla made history by winning the Fan Choice Award at the 2024 Juno Awards, a prestigious award previously won by national icons such as Justin Bieber and Nelly Furtado. Meanwhile, Sidhu Moose Wala's posthumous single "Drippy" featuring AR Paisley has made history by debuting at No. 9 on the Canadian Hot 100 as the highest charting Punjabi song in Canadian history.

Observers of the genre's rise believe that Punjabi Canadian hip-hop may emerge to see the same level of global influence that Reggaeton has had in decades prior.

== French Canadian hip-hop ==
Montreal, being Canada's second largest city and one of the world's largest French-speaking cities, has developed its own niche of French language hip-hop, which later spread to Quebec City and throughout the province of Quebec. The first known francophone Canadian rap single, Lucien Francœur's 1983 song "Le Rap-à-Billy", was not conventional hip-hop as that term is understood today, but featured Francœur rapping over a hybrid funk-rockabilly track which presaged the much later rap rock genre.

Although a few French rap singles broke through to mainstream success in the late 1980s and early 1990s, such as Les French B's "Je m'en souviens", Kool Rock and Jay Tree's "M.R.F. est arrivé", Le Boyfriend's "Rapper chic (Je rap en français)", Laymen Twaist's "Walk on the Wild Side" and Dédé Tracké's "T'es qui toé", as in English Canada this early success was not sustained, and francophone hip-hop remained largely an underground phenomenon until the emergence of Dubmatique, who became in 1997 the first francophone Canadian hip-hop group to have a number-one hit on Canada's francophone Top 40 charts. Their debut album titled Dubmatique went platinum, and they received a number of rewards, most notably from MuchMusic and ADISQ.

In 2005, The Dope Poet Society released a multilingual single and video entitled, "All of Us" off the album ProIntelpro: Promote Intelligence Program. Lead vocalist ProfessorD.us raps in both English and French on the track, accompanied by a posse of six other rappers rhyming in a total of five different languages. The most internationally successful hip-hop musician from Quebec is Ghislain Poirier, a producer whose own albums primarily feature francophone rappers from Quebec and France, but who is also now an influential remixer equally sought after by anglophone rappers and dance musicians from Canada and the United States. Roi Heenok, a rapper from Montreal, has become an Internet phenomenon in France, and has performed in Paris three times since 2004.

Other significant francophone rappers who have emerged the in 21st century have included LMDS, Muzion, Manu Militari, Yvon Krevé, Loco Locass, K.Maro, Catburglaz, Atach Tatuq, Taktika, Sans Pression, Le Cerveau, High-Cue, Rainmen, Omnikrom, Anodajay, Gatineau, Radio Radio, Alaclair Ensemble, Boogat, Koriass, Loud Lary Ajust, Sarahmée, Pierre Kwenders, Tizzo, Dead Obies, FouKi, Souldia and Treizième Etage.

In 2024, an exhibit about Quebec's Hip Hop took place at the Musée de la civilisation to recognize its cultural impact on the region.

== Indigenous hip-hop ==
TKO and his younger brother G.Q. Smooth, who was also known as D-Lite on the Winnipeg local public access television show VPW Spotlight in the early 1990s are attributed to be the first indigenous rappers in Canada. They started rapping in the mid 1970s, and were the first Canadian indigenous rappers to be nominated for Juno and Grammy awards; as well recognized to be the first indigenous rapper to be featured on APTN's introduction commercials for Much Music and CBC television. These brothers introduced rap to communities world-wide and performed at major sporting events such as the 1996 Olympic Games in Atlanta, Georgia, USA; and many other world and national sporting events. TKO's music was the first indigenous rapper to have his music inducted into the Smithsonian in the early 1990s.

Hip-hop has been also a prominent influence on contemporary First Nations and Métis youth culture since the 1990s. The first indigenous hip-hop video to garner any airplay from MuchMusic was War Party's socially-conscious "Feelin' Reserved" in 2001. The group went on to win the Canadian Aboriginal Music Award for Rap Album of the Year and tour internationally, representing Canada at the World Expo in Nagoya, Japan, and performing at the First Americans Festival at the Smithsonian Museum.

Other artists from this early wave included Winnipeg's Most, Kinnie Starr, Tru Rez Crew, Drezus, Eekwol, Inez Jasper, Manik 1derful, OS-12, Joey Stylez, Lil Pappie, Wab Kinew, TKO, Samian, Crystle Lightning, A Tribe Called Red, JB the First Lady, Bryden Gwiss Kiwenzie, Snotty Nose Rez Kids and Team Rezofficial. Wab Kinew would enter politics and became Premier of Manitoba in 2023.

Duke Redbird, a spoken word poet, has also been cited as an important influence on the genre despite his work not being directly in the genre itself.

David Dacoine, a member of Tribal Wizdom, has hosted workshops across Canada encouraging indigenous youth to take up hip-hop as a method of creative expression and self-empowerment. Anish created the first ever First Nations Hip Hop Festival; subsequently, the event was held at Pasqua, Saskatchewan in 2004. The festival faltered for a number of years after that, but was reestablished in 2013.

The Aboriginal Voices radio network has also aired a weekly program, hosted by Plex, devoted to indigenous hip-hop.

In 2009, Team Rezofficial became the first indigenous hip-hop group with a song on the RapCity Top Ten. The song "Lonely" went to number one. In the same year, Manitoba's Native Communications radio network launched Streetz FM, a hip-hop station in Winnipeg which was Canada's first radio station marketed primarily to indigenous youth.

Besides music, hip-hop culture has had a major impact on urban indigenous youth in Canada in areas such as fashion and visual art. In 2013, the Vancouver Art Gallery toured the show Beat Nation: Art, Hip Hop and Aboriginal Culture, featuring works by indigenous artists influenced by hip-hop themes.

== Influences ==
Although American East Coast hip-hop and West Coast hip-hop are major influences on Canadian artists in the genre, Canadian hip-hop also incorporates a number of other influences not commonly seen in the mainstream of the American genre. The Black Canadian community is much more dominated by people of Caribbean heritage than is the African American community in the United States. As a result, Canadian hip-hop is significantly influenced by the rhythms and styles of Caribbean music. English Canadian hip-hop tends to be influenced by Jamaican, Trinidadian and Bahamian styles, while francophone hip-hop from Quebec is commonly influenced by French Antillean, Dominican or Haitian music. Artists such as Drake, Michie Mee, Dream Warriors, Ghetto Concept, and Kardinal Offishall have incorporated dancehall or reggae into their music.

Even those artists who do not use obvious Caribbean sounds are often influenced by Caribbean English and themes. A famous example is the Kardinal Offishall song "BaKardi Slang", which gives examples of Toronto black youth slang—many derived from Caribbean speech. As well, Rastafarian vocabulary, speaking of good as "Zion" and evil as "Babylon" for example, is quite common, even if the rappers are not themselves Rasta.

The genre-hopping "Tom Waits with a beatbox" style of Buck 65, who integrates country, rock, folk and blues influences into his music, has also become a major influence on Canadian hip-hop in the 2000s. His influence is especially strong on hip-hop artists from the Maritime provinces, such as Classified, but can also be seen in artists such as Ridley Bent and Mcenroe.

Electronic music is also a significant influence, notably seen in artists such as Cadence Weapon, No Luck Club, Tre Mission, Kaytranada and Ghislain Poirier; jazz music has been incorporated since the early 1990s, particularly in the work of Dream Warriors, Social Deviantz, Mood Ruff and Da Grassroots. Artists such as K'naan, k-os, Grand Analog, Touch and Nato, Dragon Fli Empire, DL Incognito and Graph Nobel have pursued styles which blend a diverse mix of hip-hop, rock, jazz, world music, and R&B influences.

== See also ==
- Music of Canada
- Canadian music genres
- Music of Canadian cultures
- Underground hip-hop
- List of Canadian hip-hop musicians
