= CNE Ontario Government Building =

Ontario Government Building
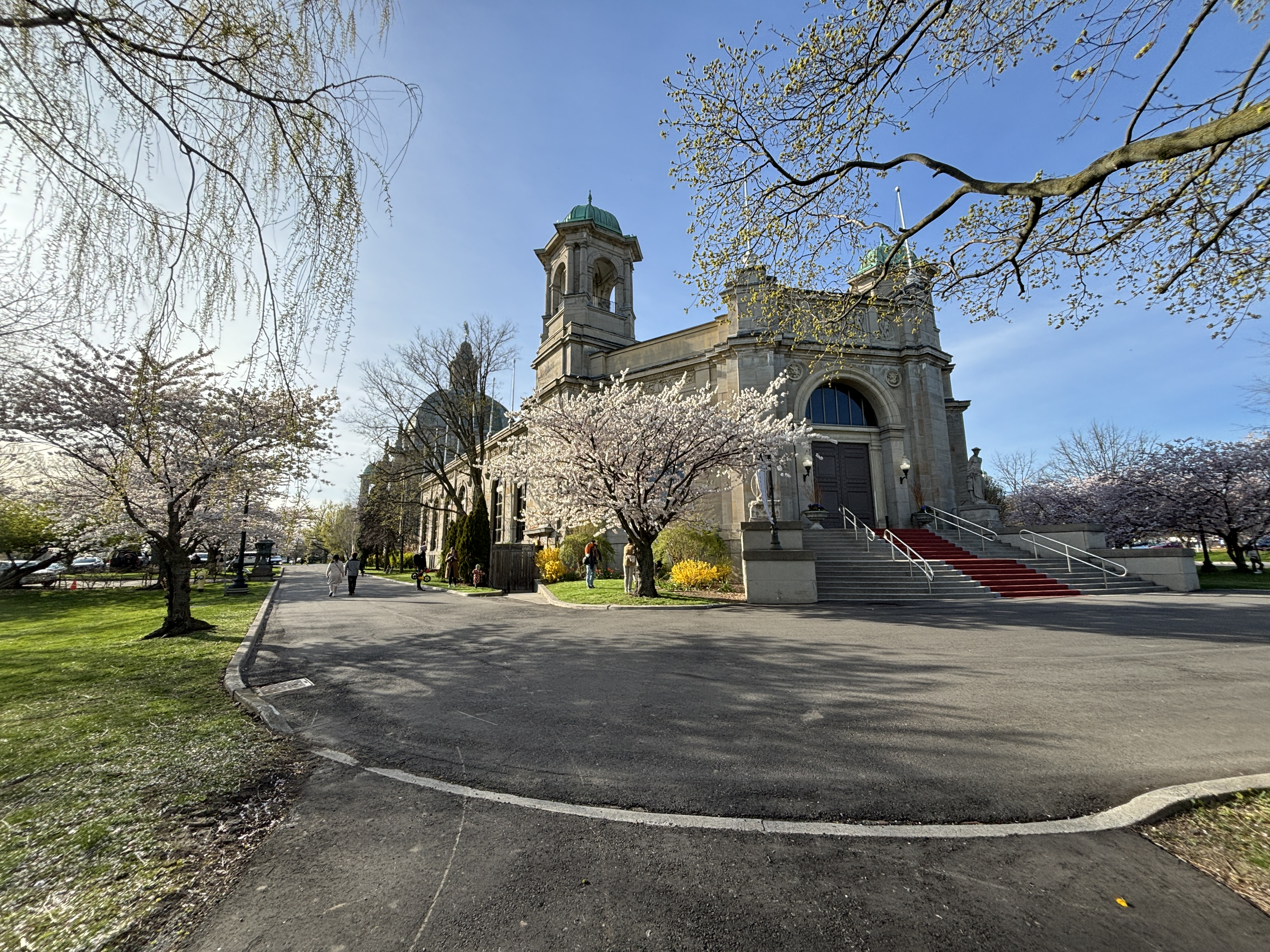
- Southwest view of the building, 2024
- Interactive map of the Ontario Government Building area
- Alternative names: Liberty Grand Entertainment Complex

General information
- Type: Exhibition building Special event space
- Architectural style: Beaux-Arts
- Location: Exhibition Place, 25 British Columbia Road, Toronto, Ontario
- Coordinates: 43.63381°N 79.41057°W
- Current tenants: Liberty Entertainment Group
- Opened: 1926
- Renovated: 2001
- Owner: City of Toronto

Technical details
- Structural system: Steel truss
- Floor count: 1
- Floor area: 100,000 square feet (9,300 m^{2})

Design and construction
- Architecture firm: Chapman and Oxley
- Main contractor: Sullivan and Fried Limited of Toronto

The Ontario Government Building, housing the Liberty Grand Entertainment Complex since 2001, is a heritage building located at Exhibition Place in Toronto, Ontario, Canada. Built in 1926 to provide exhibit space for the Government of Ontario during the annual Canadian National Exhibition (CNE), that function later moved to the Ontario Place complex. After a period of disuse, Toronto City Council approved a long-term lease with the Liberty Entertainment Group to use the building for private events.

== Description ==
The one-storey building has a triangular layout, fronting on Lake Shore Boulevard on the southwest, British Columbia Road on the north and Alberta Circle on the east. The building has a central open triangular courtyard with the three wings surrounding it. Along the property facing Lake Shore Boulevard is a large concrete plaza leading down to the road, originally to the lake. Beside the steps leading down are two carved stone lions. Each lion's pedestal bears a historical plaque.

The reinforced concrete Beaux-Arts building was designed by the architectural firm of Chapman and Oxley, which designed several other public buildings in the area. The structure was built between November 1925 and August 1926 by contractors Sullivan and Fried Limited of Toronto. It was originally called the "New Ontario Government Buildings". The exterior was very ornate, but the interior (used for exhibit space) was originally not decorated, much like a warehouse.

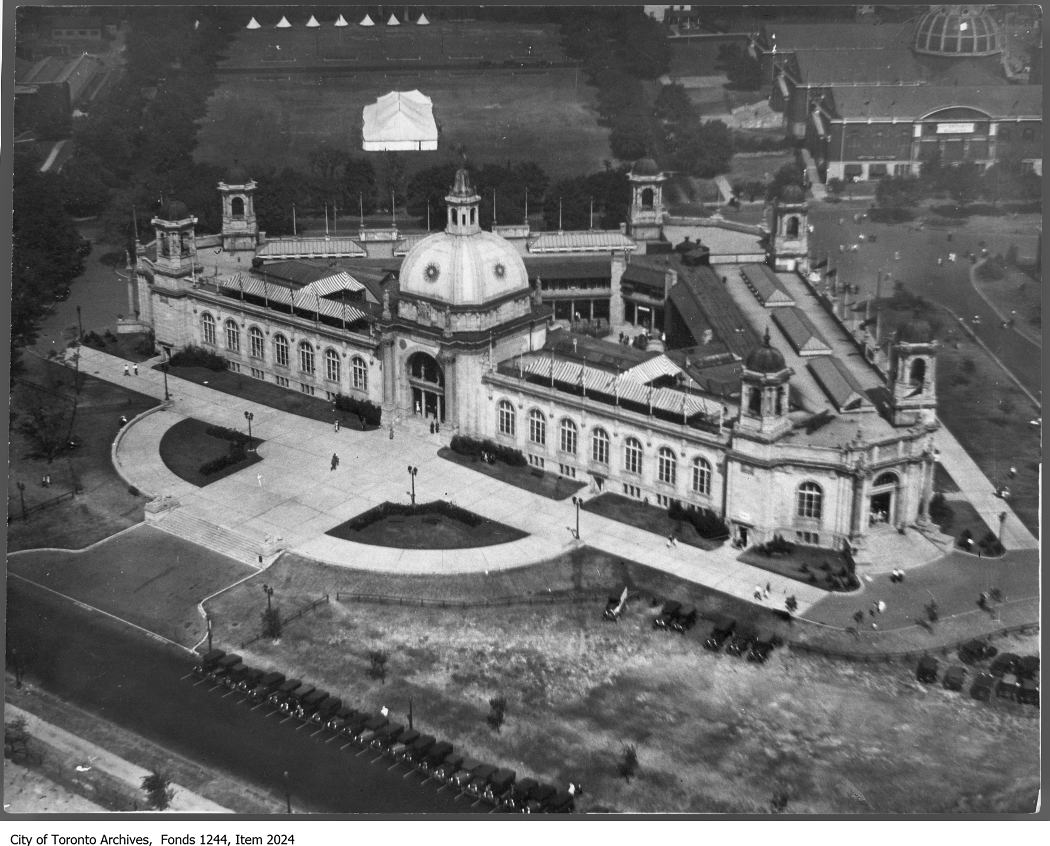
Aerial view of the building in 1929

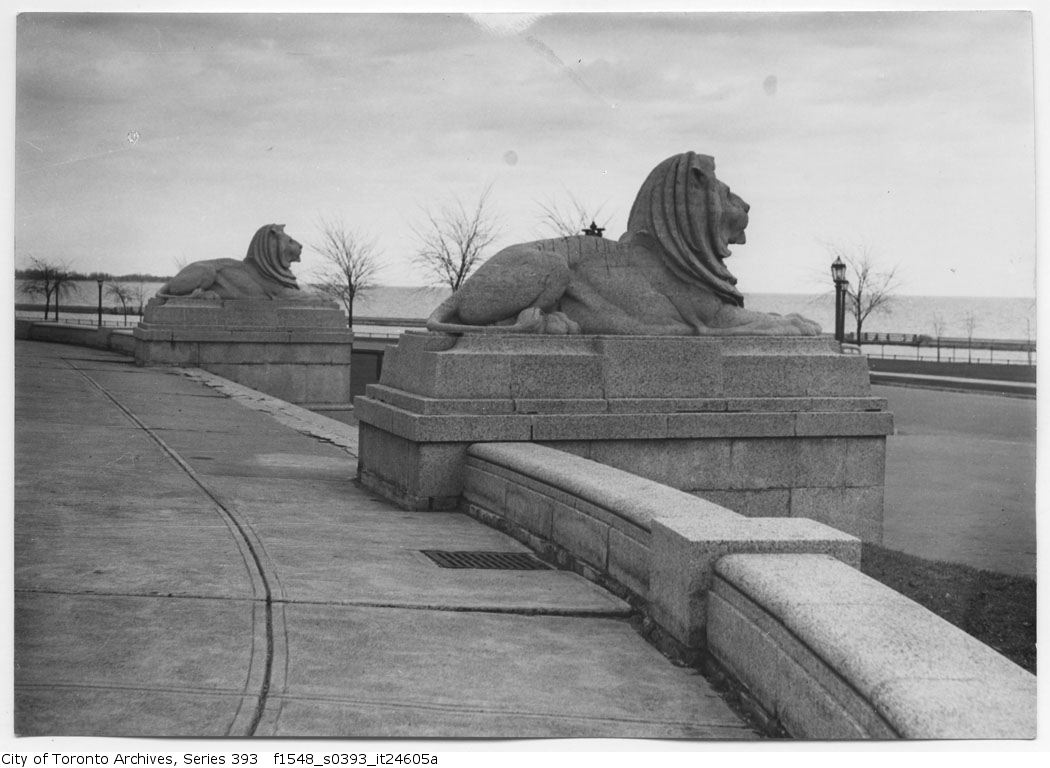
View of the stone lions on the grounds

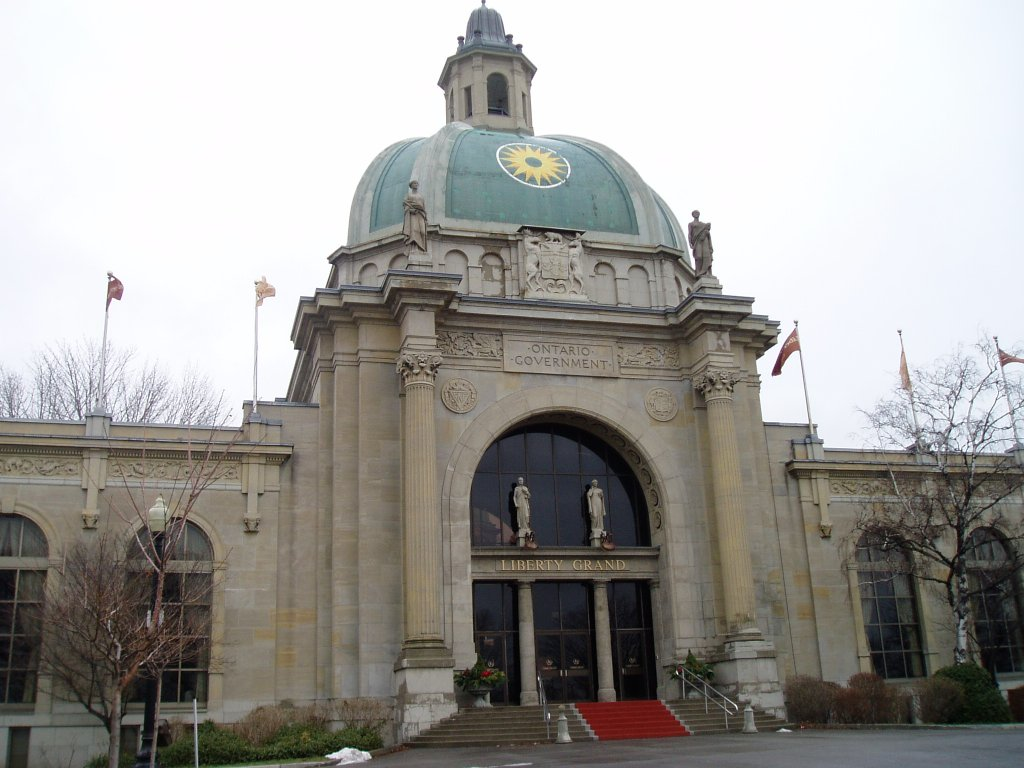
Entrance to the building in 2005

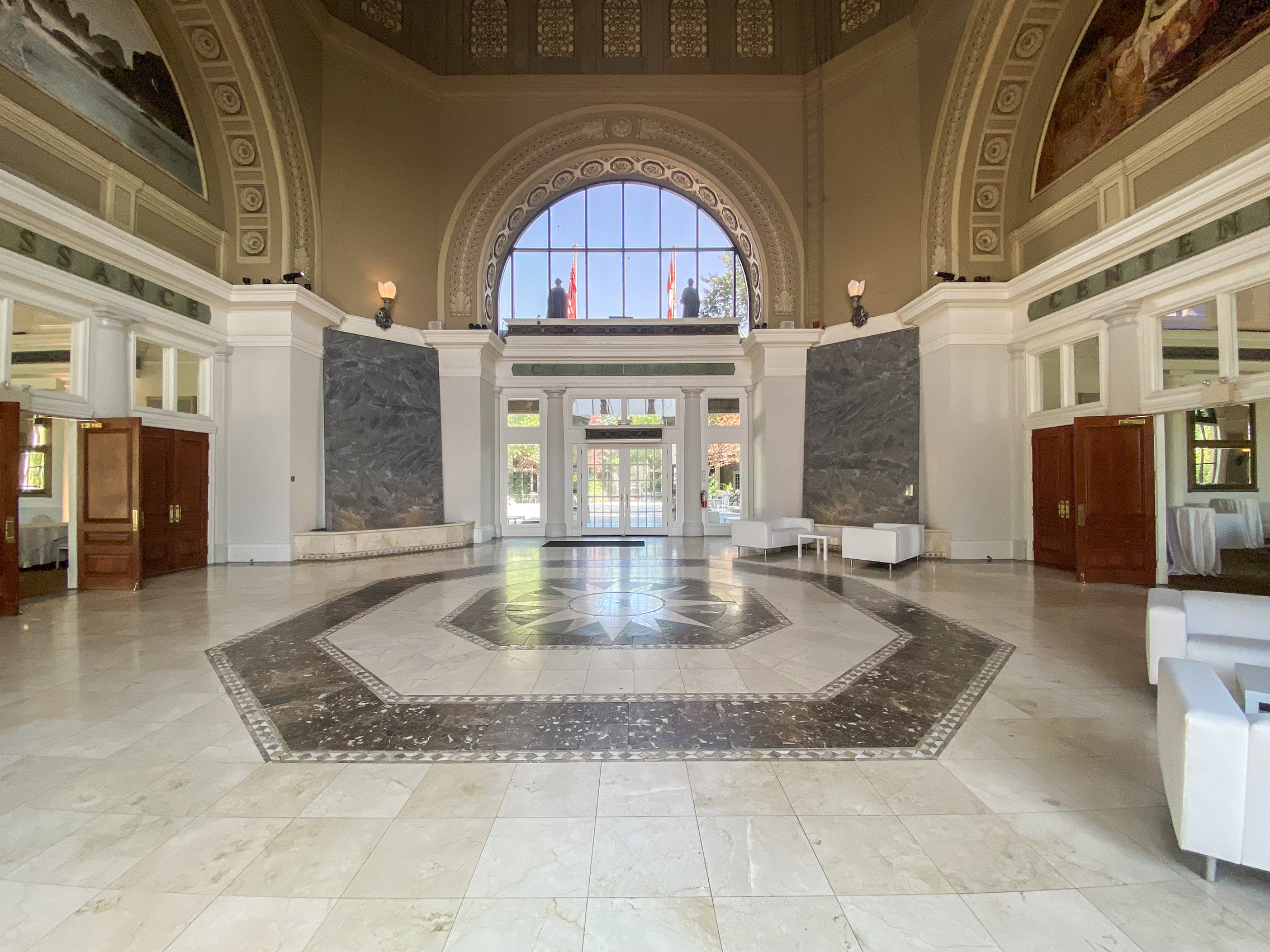
Lobby in 2024

== History ==
The building was built to display Government of Ontario exhibits during the Canadian National Exhibition (CNE). In 1971, the Government of Ontario opened Ontario Place on new artificial islands on Lake Ontario, just south of the site as a permanent exhibit of Ontario. Ontario discontinued its use of the building, which then became the site of general exhibits during the CNE.

In 2000, the City of Toronto released a "Request for Proposals" for long-term development of the building. Of five proposals, Toronto City Council approved the Liberty Grand Proposal for a 20-year lease of the building. Liberty Entertainment Group agreed to spend CA$4.95 million on renovations and pay $3.76 million in rent for the 20 years to use the building as a private ballroom venue. The company refinished the interior with decorations and furnishings to match the exterior, and the building re-opened in 2001. The building now houses multiple ballrooms and can accommodate up to 3,000 guests.

== Liberty Grand ==
The Liberty Grand Entertainment Complex has several areas for banquets and balls, including three grand ballrooms decorated in a traditional style, and one contemporary open-concept room

=== Governors Room ===
This is the largest ballroom of the complex, with a capacity of up to 1500 people. With a spacious entrance and foyer, this room incorporates a grand oak staircase to the upper mezzanine level, which overlooks the courtyard and main room. Traditional French doors open the main ballroom onto the courtyard with a view of the building's duomo.

=== Renaissance Room and Centennial Room ===
These two banquet rooms are a mirror image of one another. Each has a private entrance reception area with polished Italian marble floors, Renaissance-style columns and French doors into each ballroom. Floor-to-ceiling arched windows line the south wall of each room to exhibit a lakefront view from all angles.
