= Maestro Fresh Wes =

Canadian rapper, record producer, and actor

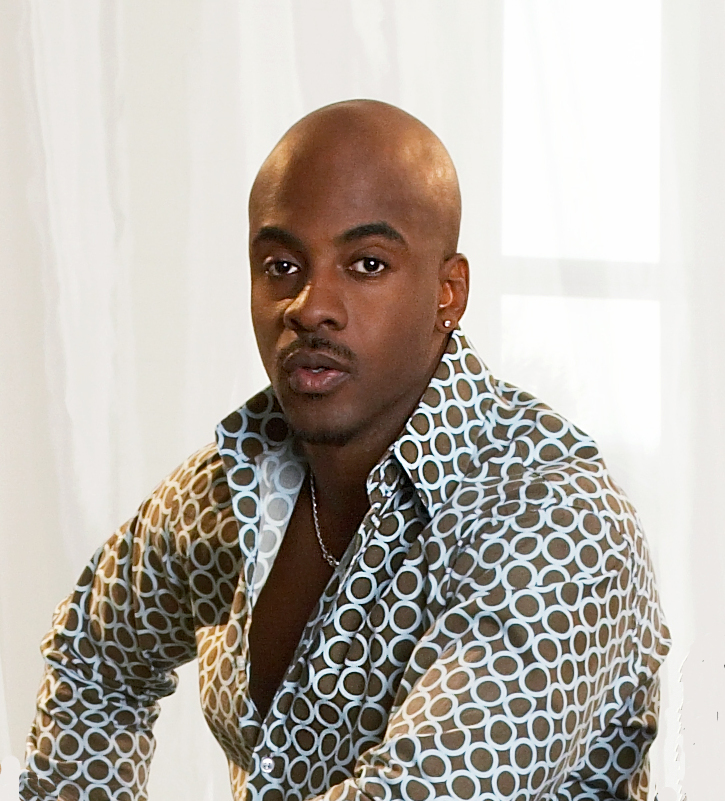
- Maestro during filming for the Instant Star TV series

Background information
- Also known as: Maestro Fresh Wes; Maestro; Melody MC; Wes Williams
- Born: Wesley Williams; March 31, 1968 (age 58)
- Origin: Toronto, Ontario, Canada
- Genres: Canadian hip-hop; hip-hop; alternative hip-hop; reggae; jazz
- Occupations: Rapper; singer; record producer; actor; author; motivational speaker
- Years active: 1987–Present
- Labels: Attic; LMR; Fontana North

Wesley "Wes" Williams (born March 31, 1968) is a Canadian rapper, singer, record producer, actor, and author. He is known professionally by his stage names Maestro Fresh Wes (formerly Maestro Fresh-Wes) or Maestro as a musician, and is credited by his birth name as an actor. One of the earliest Canadian rappers to achieve mainstream success, he is credited as the "Godfather of Canadian hip-hop". His debut album, Symphony in Effect (1989), was the first certified platinum album by a Black Canadian artist, and his 2023 induction into the Canadian Music Hall of Fame and 2024 Governor General's Performing Arts Award were each the first for any hip-hop artist.

== Early life and education ==
Williams was born on March 31, 1968, in Toronto, Ontario, to parents of Afro-Guyanese heritage. He is the oldest of three children and was raised in North York and Scarborough. He attended Senator O'Connor College School and then moved to L'Amoreaux Collegiate Institute for the remainder of his high school career.

He attended Carleton University in Ottawa, studying law and political science for one year.

== Career ==
=== 1979–1989: Early career ===
Williams' interest in hip-hop music began at age 11. to age 15, in 1983, he met DJ Ron Nelson, who promoted Williams' music under the moniker Melody MC with Ebony MC as the rap group Vision MC’s on his radio show, 88.1 CKLN-FM. Nearly two years later, Williams met Farley Flex, who he went on to work with in 1988. That same year, he officially adopted the name Maestro Fresh-Wes and recorded the independent demos, "You Can't Stop Us Now" and "I'm Showin' You". While performing on MuchMusic's Electric Circus, Wes met dance artist Stevie B, who connected him with his NYC-based label, LMR. This changed the climate for hip-hop in Canada as Wes performed "Let Your Backbone Slide" for the first time. This song became the first single from a Canadian hip-hop artist to go gold, followed by Canada's first platinum-selling hip-hop album, Symphony in Effect.

=== 1989–1991: Symphony in Effect and "Can't Repress the Cause" ===
In 1989, Maestro released his first album, Symphony in Effect. The following year he became the first Canadian rapper to have a Billboard Top 40 hit, "Let Your Backbone Slide". In 1991, he collaborated on the one-off single "Can't Repress the Cause", a plea for greater inclusion of hip-hop music in the Canadian music scene. The collaboration was with Dance Appeal, a supergroup of Toronto-area musicians that included: Devon, Dream Warriors, B-Kool, Michie Mee, Lillian Allen, Eria Fachin, HDV (aka "Pimp of The Microphone"), Dionne, Thando Hyman, Carla Marshall, Messenjah, Jillian Mendez, Lorraine Scott, Lorraine Segato, Candy Pennella, Self Defense, Leroy Sibbles, Zama and Thyron Lee White.

=== 1991–1999: Entering the U.S market and The Black Tie Affair ===
After the success of his 1991 album, The Black Tie Affair, Maestro's career faltered as he attempted to break into the United States market. In 1992, Maestro appeared in a video accompanying a rendition of "O Canada" in which he rapped an improvised second-verse lyric, "aw, yeah, from the east coast, of Newfoundland, to the west coast, of B.C.". He returned to the Canadian charts in 1998 with the hit singles "Stick to Your Vision" and "416/905 (T.O. Party Anthem)".

=== 2000: Ever Since ===
In 2000, he released his sixth studio album, Ever Since, featured the track "Bustin Loose", in which Maestro teamed up with Kardinal Offishall.

=== 2005: "A Criminal Mind" cover ===
In 2005, Maestro covered Lawrence Gowan's song "A Criminal Mind" (featuring Infinite); Gowan appears in the video and his vocals are sampled on the track. Gowan also performed the song with Maestro at the Canadian Urban Music Awards in 2006.

=== 2006: Midem conference ===
In 2006, Maestro and Rochester AKA Juice joined Professor D and The Dope Poet Society on stage in Cannes, France. Together, they become the first Canadian hip-hop acts to showcase at Midem, the world's largest annual music industry conference.

=== 2012–2013: Black Tuxedo and Orchestrated Noise ===
In 2012, Maestro released his first set of new material in over seven years with the release of the EP Black Tuxedo, which was nominated for Best Rap Recording of the Year at the 2012 Juno Awards. This was followed by the album Orchestrated Noise in 2013, which features rocker Sam Roberts, opera singer Measha Brueggergosman, Kardinal Offishall, American rapper Kool G Rap of the Juice Crew, and Brand Nubian veteran Sadat X, among others. Orchestrated Noise was released under the name Maestro Fresh Wes, reclaiming his original title from the 1980s.

=== 2015 ===
Maestro released Compositions Volume 1 which included his personal favorite song he ever wrote, "I know Your Mom", and the sports classic "Underestimated", which was played during the 2015 Pan Am Games and was featured on the EA Sports NHL 17 video game.

=== 2017–2019: Coach Fresh and Champagne Campaign ===
His 2017 album, Coach Fresh, included the song "Jurassic Park", a collaboration with Rich Kidd to celebrate the Toronto Raptors. In 2019, the song was released as a single and video to celebrate the Raptors making the 2019 NBA Finals. Coach Fresh was also nominated for Best Rap Recording of the Year but was beaten by Canadian MC Tory Lanez. The album Champagne Campaign was released in March 2019. This album featured tracks by Lord Finesse and collaborations with Planet Asia, Sadat X, Dusty Wallace and Naturally Born Strangers. On November 21, 2019, "Let Your Backbone Slide" was the first rap song to be inducted into the Canadian Songwriters Hall of Fame.

=== 2020–present ===
In 2020, after the outbreak of the COVID-19 pandemic, Williams and his family moved to the port city of Saint John, New Brunswick. The radio show Maestro In The Maritimes became a regional favourite featuring his own playlists and commentary. In 2021, Willams published his second children's book "Stick To Your Vision: Young Maestro Goes to School" that encourages fun and self expression through hip-hop, poetry, and music. His performance of "Let Your Backbone Slide" was performed and celebrated at the 50th anniversary presentation of the country's Juno Awards. in the summer of 2021, he was cast as the host of the hit reality show Race Against the Tide show which aired on CBC in July 2022. Produced by Toronto-based Marble Media, and filmed on New River Beach, New Brunswick, the series brings together the best sand sculptors in the world to win challenges before the tide sweeps their art away.

In 2024, Williams was inducted into the Canadian Music Hall of Fame, becoming the first hip-hop musician to do so. He was featured on a Canada Post stamp in February 2026 as part of its Black History Month collection.

=== Acting ===
Williams was nominated for a Gemini Award for Best Supporting Actor in a Dramatic Role for his performance on the television series The Line on HBO Canada. He has also had acting roles in the series Metropia, Instant Star, Platinum, and Blue Murder, as well as the films Poor Boy's Game, Honey, Paid In Full, Four Brothers and Redemption: The Stan Tookie Williams Story. As an actor, he is credited as Wes Williams.

Williams played the role of teacher and vice principal Paul Dwyer on the CBC Television program, Mr. D for 8 seasons from 2012-2018.

Relatedly, Williams also hosts the CBC Television program Race Against the Tide, taking over from Shaun Majumder for the show's second season which originally aired in 2022.

=== Author ===
In 2010, co-wrote a self-help motivational book with his wife called Stick to Your Vision: How to Get Past the Hurdles & Haters to Get Where You Want to Be. The foreword of the book was written by Chuck D of the hiphop group Public Enemy. It is part of the Nova Scotia Community College (NSCC) curriculum and a mandatory reading for high school students in Nova Scotia. In 2016 Wes received an honorary diploma from the NSCC Akerley Campus in Dartmouth NS for his contribution to the community and inspiration to the students.

=== Charity work ===
Over his career, Williams has supported the following charities: War Child, Save the Children, SickKids Hospital, Covenant House, Special Olympics, Battered Women's Support Services (BWSS), and the African AIDS Society.

== Personal life ==
Williams has previously lived in major cities including Toronto, Vancouver and New York. In October 2020, he and his family relocated from Toronto to their current residence in Saint John, New Brunswick, influenced by both the COVID-19 pandemic and family-wise interests, such as being closer to relatives. Since moving to Saint John, Williams became actively involved in the community, having hosted a weekly radio show "Maestro in the Maritimes" on the city's 97.3 The Wave station, focusing on 90s-2000s hip-hop music. He has also been appointed as an ambassador for Saint John, and has coached for children's sports teams in the area. Additionally, Williams was the host and MC of the 2022 East Coast Music Awards in Fredericton, New Brunswick, and he ran an Atlantic Canadian-based cooking show "Maestro Chef Wes". In 2023, Williams introduced the annual Maestro Fresh Wes Scholarship at the Nova Scotia Community College (NSCC), which provides financial support for Black trades and transportation students.

== Discography ==
=== Studio albums ===
- Symphony in Effect (1989)
- The Black Tie Affair (1991)
- Maestro Zone (1992)
- Naaah, Dis Kid Can't Be from Canada?!! (1994)
- Built to Last (1998)
- Ever Since (2000)
- Orchestrated Noise (2013)
- Coach Fresh (2017)
- Champagne Campaign (2019)

=== EPs ===
- Black Tuxedo (2012)
- Compositions Volume 1 (2015)

=== Compilations ===
- Urban Landmark 1989–2005 (2005)
- Rap Prime Minister (2024)
