= 2Rude =

Canadian record producer

2rude
- Also known as: Richard Rude, Richard Rudimental
- Born: Richard Coombs
- Genres: Hip hop, Rhythm and blues
- Occupation: Record producer
- Label: Rudimental Records Inc.

2rude, birth name Richard Coombs also known as Richard Rude or Richard Rudimental, is a Canadian hip hop and rhythm and blues record producer. He is perhaps most known as a producer of the songs "Thinkin' About You", a collaboration with Snow, rapper Smoothe tha Hustler and singers Miranda and Latoya Walsh, which won Juno Award for R&B/Soul Recording of the Year at the Juno Awards of 2000, and "Bout Your Love", a collaboration with Glenn Lewis which was nominated in the same category at the Juno Awards of 1999.

Both songs were featured on 2rude's album Rudimental 2K. The album also included the single "Dissin' Us", a collaboration with Grimmi Grimmi and Jully Black which won the MuchMusic Video Award for Best R&B/Soul Video in 2000... making it his 2nd consecutive win for Best R&B/Soul Video after the 1999 win with "Thinkin' About You", a collaboration with Snow, rapper Smoothe tha Hustler and singers Miranda and Latoya Walsh as well

2rude has been an independent artist and producer on his label Rudimental Records Inc. The Walsh sisters, the daughters of Eric Walsh of the reggae band Messenjah, went on to join the reunited touring lineup of The Parachute Club.
