= B-Kool =

Canadian rapper

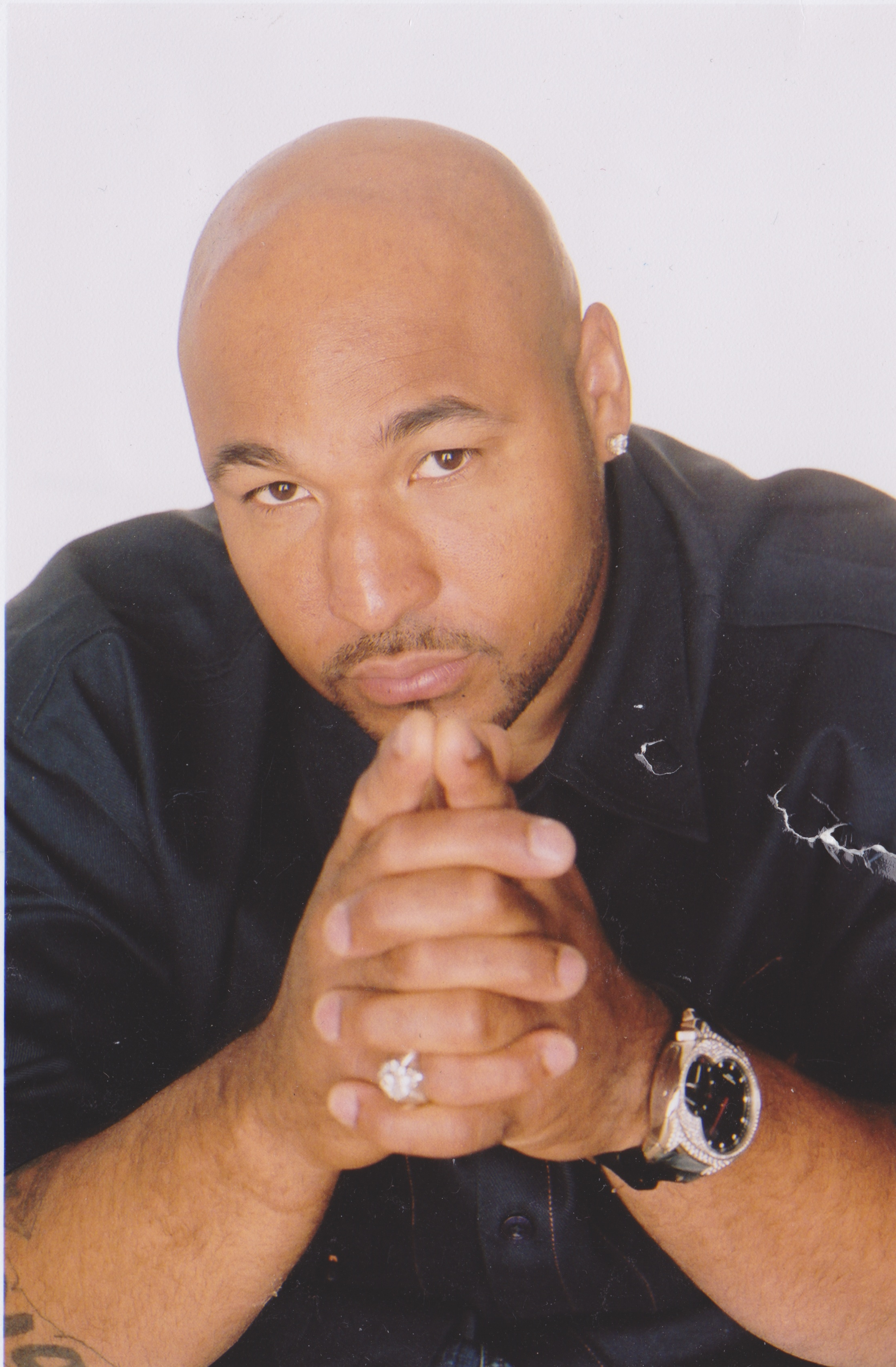

Background information
- Also known as: MC B, B-Kool, Don Carlito
- Born: Carl Badwa; February 24, 1968 (age 58)
- Origin: Toronto, Ontario, Canada
- Genres: Hip hop
- Occupations: Record producer; rapper; songwriter
- Years active: 1984–present
- Formerly of: Get Loose Crew

Carl Badwa (born February 24, 1968), better known as his stage name B-Kool and today as Don Carlito, is a Canadian record producer and rapper.

== Early life and career ==
Carl Badwa began his music career in 1985 then joined the Get Loose Crew in 1987.

== Awards ==
In 1990, B-Kool shared in Simply Majestic's Juno Award for Best R&B Soul Recording for "Dance to the Music". In the same year he participated in the recording of "Can't Repress the Cause", a collaborative single released under the name Dance Appeal to advocate for greater inclusion of hip hop in the mainstream of Canadian music. In 1994, he received a Juno nomination for "Gotta Get Over", from his solo album "Mellow Madness".

=== Comeback ===
In 2003, he resumed performing, under the name "Don Carlito", with the EP What’s The D.E.A.L. In 2013 he partnered with Frank Morell to release "Fire", and in 2016 they released "Reloaded".

== Discography ==
=== Studio albums ===
- Get Loose Crew (1988)
- Mellow Madness (1994)
- The D.E.A.L. (Dog Eats At Last) (2003)
- Reloaded (2016)

=== Singles ===
- Dance To The Music / Work your body (1990)
- Gotta Get Over (1994)
- Asi Como Mi (2001)
- Just Like Me (2002)
- Fire (2013)

== See also ==
- Canadian hip hop
- Music of Canada
