= Ghetto Concept =

Canadian hip-hop group

- Origin: Toronto, Ontario, Canada
- Genres: Canadian hip hop, East Coast hip hop
- Years active: 1992–2004, 2011
- Labels: Groove-a-Lot Records, 7 Bills Entertainment, G7 Records
- Members: Kwajo Cinqo; Dolo
- Past members: Infinite

Ghetto Concept is a Canadian hip-hop duo from Toronto, Ontario, composed of Kwajo Cinqo and Dolo.

== History ==
Kwajo Cinqo (Kwajo Boateng) and Dolo (Lowell Frazer) formed Ghetto Concept in 1992, hailing from the Rexdale and Lawrence Heights neighbourhoods of Toronto. Their first single "Certified" was released in 1993 by independent label Groove-a-Lot Records. In 1994, they released their second single "E-Z On Tha Motion". "Certified" and "E-Z On Tha Motion" would go on to win the group Juno Awards in 1995 and 1996 respectively.

In 1994, they were featured in Andrew Munger's documentary film Make Some Noise.

Ghetto Concept created 7 Bills Entertainment Inc. in 1996 and released the single "Much Luv", which featured Infinite. The duo released their self-titled debut album Ghetto Concept in 1998, along with the singles "Krazy World" and "Precious Metals"; Sticky Fingaz was featured on the remix of "Heavy Metals". In 1999, they received gold certification for their single "Too Much", which was featured on The Baby Blue Soundcrew's Private Party album. In 2001, Ghetto Concept signed a licensing deal with BMG Music Canada. That same year, they released a remix of "Too Much" (entitled "Still Too Much"), which featured Maestro, Kardinal Offishall, Red-1, Ironside, and Snow. On March 19, 2002, they released their next album, Ghetto Concept Presents...7 Bills All-Stars: Da Album.

On February 21, 2004, Ghetto Concept's longtime manager, Elliott Reid-Thomas, was murdered. That same year, the group changed the name of their label to G7 Records Inc. During this time period, they recorded music in Toronto, Los Angeles, New York and Atlanta. In the years since, they made their catalogue of music available on all major music platforms.

Ghetto Concept performed on March 29, 2011, at CBC's Hip-Hop Summit, along with fellow Canadian artists Maestro Fresh Wes, Michie Mee, and Dream Warriors at an event that was the first of its kind in Canada. The concert was staged at CBC's Glenn Gould Studio and hosted by CBC Radio 2. Additionally, the event and Ghetto Concept themselves were also highlighted in Love, Props and the T.Dot a documentary which was hosted by CBC Toronto's Dwight Drummond.

In 2018, three of Ghetto Concept's pictures were featured in the McMichael Canadian Art Collection gallery in Kleinburg, Ontario, which also hosted portraits from the legendary Group of Seven.

== Discography ==
- CERTIFIED (Single) (1993)
- EZ on the Motion (Single) (1994)
- Much Luv (Single) (1996)
- Crazy World (Single) (1997)
- Ghetto Concept (Album) (1998)
- Still Too Much ft Maestro Fresh Wes, Kardinal Offishall, Red-1 (Rascalz), Ironside, Snow (Single) (2001)
- Ghetto Concept Presents...7 Bills All-Stars: Da Album (2002)
- Here We Go Again ft Lil' Flip (Single) (2004)
- Legendary (2025)

== See also ==
- Canadian hip hop
- Music of Canada
