= LeFrak-Moelis Records =

- Founded: Samuel J. LeFrak
- Country of origin: United States

LeFrak-Moelis Records (or LMR for short) was a New York City-based record label founded by Samuel J. LeFrak of the LeFrak Organization and Herb Moelis, an executive who had worked for Columbia Pictures' music division, and later, Kirshner Entertainment. They had initial success in the late 1980s and early 1990s with Miami-based freestyle artist Stevie B. Other artists that LMR had in its roster included Maestro Fresh Wes, Daisy Dee and Jaya.

Its sister label, Saja Records, held the rights to Jim Croce's ABC-Dunhill releases (purchased by LeFrak in 1985) and Stevie B's recordings before he signed with Empire Musicwerks during the mid-2000s. The LeFrak/LMR/Saja catalog was sold to R2M Music in 2008, and R2M was later absorbed by BMG Rights Management in 2012.

Originally an independent label, LMR was later distributed by RCA Records, and later by Atlantic Records.

== See also ==
- List of record labels
