= K-os discography =

k-os discography
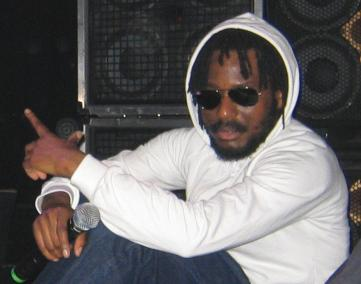
- Studio albums: 6
- Compilation albums: 3
- Singles: 19
- Collaborations: 17
- Mixtapes: 1
- DVDs: 1

This is the discography of k-os, a Canadian rapper, singer, and record producer. He has released six studio albums, three compilations, nineteen singles, one mixtape, and one DVD.

== Albums ==
=== Studio albums ===
Year	Album	Chart positions			Certifications
Year	Album	CAN	US	U.S. Heat	Certifications
2002	Exit: Released: March 26, 2002; Label: Astralwerks	75	—	—	
2004	Joyful Rebellion: Released: August 13, 2004; Label: EMI / Virgin Records	7	—	—	MC: Platinum
2006	Atlantis: Hymns for Disco: Released: October 10, 2006; Label: EMI / Virgin Records	5	152	5	MC: Platinum
2009	Yes!: Released: April 14, 2009; Label: Universal Music Canada	9	—	—	MC: Gold
2013	Black on Blonde: Released: January 29, 2013; Label: EMI	16	—	44	
2015	Can't Fly Without Gravity: Released: September 4, 2015; Label: Dine Alone Records	—	—	—	
"—" denotes releases that did not chart.

=== Compilations ===
Year	Album
2007	Collected: Released: July 17, 2007; Label: EMI / Virgin Records / Astralwerks
2009	The Trill: A Journey so Far: Released: December 1, 2009; Label: EMI / Virgin Records / Astralwerks
2011	MuchMusic Presents: k-os Live: Released: October 4, 2011; Label: Universal Music Canada
2022	15!: Released: May 13, 2022; Label: Universal Music Canada

=== EPs ===
Year	Album
2026	Blackneck: Released: October 30, 2026; Label: Spiritual Tech Records

=== Mixtapes ===
Year	Album
2010	The Anchorman Mixtape: Released: August 9, 2010

== Singles ==
Year	Single	Peak positions					Certifications	Album
Year	Single	CAN	CAN CHR	CAN Hot AC	CAN Rock	AUS	Certifications	Album
1993	"Musical Essence"	—	×	×	×	—		Non-album single
1996	"Rise Like the Sun"	—	×	×	—	—		Non-album single
1996	"Take You There"	—	×	×	—	—		Non-album single
2002	"Heaven Only Knows"	—	×	×	×	—		Exit
2002	"Superstarr Pt. Zero"	—	×	×	×	—		Exit
2002	"Exit (Call Me)"	—	×	×	×	—		Exit
2003	"Follow Me" (feat. Red 1)	—	×	×	×	—		Exit
2004	"B-Boy Stance"	—	—	—	—	—		Joyful Rebellion
2004	"Crabbuckit"	11	3	5	—	—	MC: Platinum	Joyful Rebellion
2005	"Man I Used to Be"	—	4	12	—	—	MC: Gold	Joyful Rebellion
2005	"The Love Song"	—	—	—	—	—		Joyful Rebellion
2005	"Crucial"	—	6	21	—	—		Joyful Rebellion
2005	"Dirty Water" (feat. Sam Roberts)	—	—	—	—	—		Joyful Rebellion
2006	"ELEctrik HeaT - the seekwiLL"	—	—	—	—	—		Atlantis: Hymns for Disco
2006	"Sunday Morning"	19	9	12	33	—	MC: Gold	Atlantis: Hymns for Disco
2006	"Flypaper"	—	30	21	—	—		Atlantis: Hymns for Disco
2007	"Born to Run"	—	32	—	48	—		Atlantis: Hymns for Disco
2007	"Equalizer"	—	—	—	—	—		Atlantis: Hymns for Disco
2009	"4, 3, 2, 1"	98	—	—	—	—		Yes!
2009	"Burning Bridges"	—	—	—	49	—		Yes!
2009	"I Wish I Knew Natalie Portman" (feat. Saukrates & Nelly Furtado)	—	43	—	—	56	MC: Gold	Yes!
2012	"The Dog Is Mine"	—	—	—	18	—		Black on Blonde
2012	"Nyce 2 Know Ya"	47	12	17	—	—		Black on Blonde
2013	"C.L.A." (feat. Travie McCoy)	—	—	—	—	—		Black on Blonde
2015	"Spaceship"	—	—	—	—	—		Can't Fly Without Gravity
2018	"No Bucks"	—	—	—	—	—		Non-album single
2020	"Supernovas"	—	—	—	—	—		Non-album single
2021	"Just What I Needed"	—	—	—	—	—		Non-album single
2021	"Hot Boy" (with Kage E)	—	—	—	—	—		Non-album single
2022	"2020"	—	—	—	—	—		Non-album single
2024	"Tifiyo!"	—	—	—	—	—		Non-album single
2026	"Eureka!"	—	—	—	—	—		Blackneck
2026	"I Would Never."	—	—	—	—	—		Blackneck
2026	"Guns&Roses"	—	—	—	—	—		Blackneck
2026	"OK Corral"	—	—	—	—	—		Blackneck
"—" denotes releases that did not chart. "×" denotes periods where charts did not exist or were not archived.

== Promotional singles ==
Year	Single	Chart positions		Album
Year	Single	CAN	CAN Rock	Album
2011	"Holy Cow"	—	29	MuchMusic Presents: k-os Live
2014	"WiLD4TheNight (EgoLand)"	—	—	Can't Fly Without Gravity
2014	"Turn Me Loose"	—	40	Can't Fly Without Gravity
2015	"Steel Sharpens Steel"	—	—	Can't Fly Without Gravity
"—" denotes releases that did not chart.

== Collaborations ==
These songs have not appeared on a studio album released by k-os.

Year	Song	Artist	Album
1998	"K-os Freestyle"	Various artists	Planet Mars EP
1998	"Global Warning"	Citizen Kane	
1998	"Hang On Here We Go! (Theme To EC)"	Jet Fuel	
1999	"Love Is in the Air"	2Rude	Rudimental 2k
1999	"Eternal"	Da Grassroots, Thrust	Passage Through Time
1999	"Fallen"	Rascalz	Global Warning
1999	"Top of the World"	Rascalz, Barrington Levy	Global Warning
2000	"Cobwebz"	Marvel	No Streets EP
2002	"One Shot"	Rascalz	Reloaded
2002	"Fooling You"	DJ Mehdi	The Story of Espion
2002	"The Bed's Too Big Without You"	Master T	Master T's Reggae Vibes Session One
2003	"Get Yourself High"	The Chemical Brothers	Singles 93–03
2003	"Livin' In A World Corrupt"	Various Artists	Peace Songs
2004	"Wonderful"	The Pangea Project	The Pangea Project
2004	"Blindspot"	DJ Kemo	Kemomatic
2005	"Calling Out"	Moka Only	The Desired Effect
2005	"Windsurfing Nation"	Broken Social Scene	Broken Social Scene
2005	"Love Song Remix"	Leeroy	Le 1er Coup De Massure
2006	"Mushaboom (K-os mix)"	Feist	Open Season
2007	"Follow Me-Flip"	Marvel	No Streets (Just the World)
2008	"Them Kids (K-OS Remix)"	Sam Roberts	Love at the End of the World
2008	"Blinded By The Sun"	Gym Class Heroes	The Quilt
2009	"Ice (K-OS Remix)"	Lights	The Ice Pack EP
2010	"Robot Kid"	Rich Kidd	We on Some Rich Kidd Shiiiit Volume 4: The Boiling Point
2012	"Doorite"	Saukrates, Nickelus F	Season One
2013	"Pyramids in the Sand"	Maestro Fresh Wes	Orchestrated Noise
2013	"Intro: Lost"	Shad	Flying Colours
2014	"Jessica"	Tre Mission	Stigmata

== DVDs ==
Year	DVD	CRIA certifications
2005	Publicity Stunt: Released: November 15, 2005; Label: EMI / Virgin Records	Platinum
