= The Trill: A Journey so Far =

Compilation album by k-os
- Released: December 1, 2009
- Genre: Canadian hip hop
- Length: 63:24
- Label: Astralwerks/Virgin/EMI

K-os chronology
Yes! (2009)	The Trill: A Journey so Far (2009)	The Anchorman Mixtape (2010)

Professional ratings
Review scores
Source	Rating
Las Vegas Critics	66%

The Trill: A Journey so Far is the second compilation album by Canadian hip-hop artist k-os. The album contains tracks from k-os's first three studio albums as well as some of the hit singles, remixes, and radio edits of a couple singles. The album also contains a leftover track from Yes!.

== Track listing ==
1. "Crabbuckit" – 3:47
2. "Sunday Morning (Radio Edit)" - 3:31
3. "Exit (Call Me)" - 4:01
4. "The Love Song" - 4:17
5. "Follow Me" - 3:48
6. "Equalizer (Go! Remix)" - 3:39
7. "Crucial" - 3:27
8. "ELEctrik HeaT - the seekwiLL" - 3:40
9. "Born to Run" - 4:51
10. "Superstarr Pt. 2 (Babylon Girl)" - 3:28
11. "Man I Used to Be (Radio Remix)" - 3:44
12. "Flypaper" - 4:11
13. "Neutroniks" - 3:52
14. "Heaven Only Knows" - 3:59
15. "B-Boy Stance" - 4:00
16. "Dance in Your Car" - 3:54
