= Greg O'Shea =

Australian record producer & musician

Greg O'Shea is an Australian record producer, audio engineer, mix engineer and musician, who has worked extensively in Canada, most notably with k-os.

== Career ==
O'Shea started his recording career at Melbourne's Metropolis Studios in 1990. He was the assistant engineer on albums by The Badloves, Things of Stone and Wood, Deborah Conway, Tim Finn, The Black Sorrows and Chocolate Starfish, as well as the Australian cast recording of Jesus Christ Superstar. He also worked with Michael Hutchence on his cover of Under My Thumb for the 1994 album Symphonic Music of The Rolling Stones.

O'Shea's film soundtrack credits include Metal Skin (second engineer), Idiot Box (assistant engineer), The Myth of Fingerprints (assistant engineer) and When Morning Comes (engineered, mixed and mastered).

Moving to Canada in 1999, O'Shea was based at Toronto's Umbrella Sound. He worked on albums by Tegan and Sara (This Business of Art), Feist (Open Season), By Divine Right (Good Morning Beautiful), Sarah Slean (Night Bugs), Starling (Stuff You Should Have Said Before) Elliott Brood (Ambassador), The Flashing Lights (Sweet Release) and Rascalz (Reloaded).

O'Shea also received critical praise for producing the mini-album by Toronto alt-rockers Hotel (My Demon Brother).

While in Canada, O'Shea worked on two platinum-selling albums with hip hop artist k-os: 2004's Joyful Rebellion (co-producing one track, engineering and mixing six tracks, engineering a further two tracks) and 2006's Atlantis: Hymns for Disco (producing one track, co-producing five tracks, engineering 12 tracks, mixing four tracks).

Both albums sold more than 100,000 copies in Canada and the production was critically acclaimed. Joyful Rebellion debuted at #7 on the Canadian Albums Chart, won three Juno Awards, two Canadian Urban Music Awards and two MuchMusic Video Awards. Atlantis: Hymns for Disco peaked at #5 on the Canadian Albums Chart and reached #5 on Billboard's Heatseekers chart. O'Shea also played electric guitar on Joyful Rebellion.

Impressed by demos recorded in the band's bedroom, O'Shea returned to Melbourne in 2004 to work with Brilliant Fanzine. He produced, co-wrote and played bass and guitar on the band's 2005 single "One in 10,000", which peaked at #3 on Triple J's Net 50. Triple J presenter Robbie Buck praised the band's "subtle form of deceptively lush indie pop" in the Triple J Magazine, J Mag.

Returning to Australia in 2007, O'Shea produced an EP for Oh Mercy (Expats & Eczema), mastered Steve Kilbey's 2008 album Painkiller, and engineered a choir recording for Augie March's 2008 album Watch Me Disappear. Since 2007, he has also worked as a live music producer with Cricket Australia, touring nationally throughout the International summer series.

In 2011, O'Shea produced a single for Paul Ruske featuring the Grammy Award-winning Soweto Gospel Choir at Iwaki Auditorium, ABC Studios, Melbourne.
