= Top of the World (Rascalz song) =

Single by Rascalz featuring Barrington Levy & K-os

from the album Global Warning
- Released: 2000
- Recorded: 1999
- Genre: Canadian hip hop
- Length: 4:48
- Label: ViK./Figure IV
- Songwriters: Kevin Brereton, Christian Bahamonde, Romeo Jacobs, Barry Patrick Leonard, Barrington Levy, Rebecca Smith, Richard Taylor
- Producer: DJ Kemo

Rascalz singles chronology
"Sharpshooter" (1999)	"Top of the World" (2000)	"Can't Relate" (2000)

Barrington Levy singles chronology
"Tribal Talk" (1991)	"Top of the World" (2000)	"Bad Boyz" (2000)

K-os singles chronology
"Rise Like the Sun" (1996)	"Top of the World" (2000)	"Heaven Only Knows" (2002)

"Top of the World" is a song by Canadian hip hop group Rascalz, released as the seventh single from their third studio album, Global Warning. The song features fellow Canadian rapper K-os and Jamaican singer Barrington Levy, who sings the chorus. The song appears on MuchMusic's compilation album, MuchDance 2001. It remains one of the group's most popular songs. In 2010, the song was sampled by Selah Sue on the title track of her 2010 EP, Raggamuffin.

== Music video ==
The music video for "Top of the World" was filmed in Vancouver. The video features the group with Levy and K-os around several areas of the city.

The video reached #1 on MuchMusic Countdown for the week of July 28, 2000.
