= Collected (k-os album) =

Compilation album by k-os
- Released: July 17, 2007
- Genre: Canadian hip hop
- Label: Astralwerks/Virgin/EMI

K-os chronology
Atlantis: Hymns for Disco (2006)	Collected (2007)	Yes! (2009)

Professional ratings
Review scores
Source	Rating
Allmusic	favorable
PopMatters	8/10

Collected is a compilation album by Canadian hip-hop artist k-os. The album contains recent tracks from the first three albums, the hit singles, and remixes of a couple singles. The album also contains three new tracks, two of which were leftovers from Atlantis: Hymns for Disco.

== Track listing ==
1. "Introsuckshun" – 0:46
2. "Superstarr Pt. Zero" - 4:29
3. "The Rain" - 3:52
4. "Man I Used to Be" - 5:03
5. "Crabbuckit" - 3:47
6. "Born to Run" - 3:39
7. "Crucial" - 3:24
8. "Mushaboom (k-os Mix)" - 4:00
9. "Sunday Morning (Twilight Mix)" - 4:18
10. "Equalizer (Go! Remix)" - 4:49
11. "I Am" - 2:18
