= Season One (Saukrates album) =

Studio album by Saukrates
- Released: April 24, 2012
- Recorded: 2009–2012
- Genre: Canadian hip hop
- Label: FrostByte; eOne
- Producer: Saukrates; Rich Kidd; School of Velocity; Phraze & Rell

Saukrates chronology
The Underground Tapes (1999)	Season One (2012)

Singles from Season One
- 1. "Drop It Down" Released: July 26, 2011; 2. "Say I" Released: October 25, 2011 Re-released: January 31, 2012

Season One is the second studio album by Canadian rapper Saukrates, released April 24, 2012. It was released independently on FrostByte Media and eOne Music, 13 years after the release of his debut album The Underground Tapes. Singles from the album include "Drop It Down" and "Say I".

== Background ==
After signing a record deal with Def Jam Recordings in 2000, Saukrates began working on his second album, Bad Addiction, which was slated to be released in 2004. He was eventually dropped by Def Jam, and failed to secure another major-label deal for the album, which was shelved despite being completed. In 2006, Saukrates' group Big Black Lincoln released their debut album, Heaven's Caught on Fire, in Canada. The album showcased his R&B-style singing abilities, which later became common in his collaborations with other artists.

The album title, Season One, is a reference to what Saukrates calls "a wonderful new beginning" in his career. On the album, he delivers a unique rapping-singing combination, paired with diverse styles of production, including boom bap, electronic, and live instrumentation. The song "On the Run" (featuring k-os and Nelly Furtado) was previously released as "I Wish I Knew Natalie Portman", a single from k-os' 2009 album Yes!.

== Reception ==
Professional ratings
Review scores
Source	Rating
Exclaim!	favorable
RapReviews	8/10

RapReviews.com gave the album an 8/10 rating, stating "The self reflection and maturity of Season One clearly make it an overall effective album," also adding "In various songs Saukrates explores the triumphs and tragedies of life while remaining optimistic that better days are ahead."

== Track listing ==
No.	Title	Producer(s)	Length
1.	"Season One"		1:55
2.	"Say I" (featuring OB O'Brien)	Rich Kidd	3:53
3.	"Before We Go" (featuring Michelle Nyce)		4:10
4.	"Doorite" (featuring Nickelus F and k-os)	School of Velocity	3:52
5.	"All in an Instant"		4:13
6.	"Remember Me"		3:46
7.	"All the Way" (featuring Tasha the Amazon)		3:27
8.	"What a Day"		4:43
9.	"Sometimes"		3:10
10.	"Only One" (featuring Bowfire)		3:40
11.	"Tomorrow"	Rich Kidd	4:28
12.	"On the Run" (featuring k-os and Nelly Furtado)	Rich Kidd	3:09
13.	"Lost"		3:30
14.	"Save the Day" (featuring Richie Hennessey and OB O'Brien)		4:21
15.	"Feels Like Summer"		3:01
16.	"iPhone4" (featuring Meesah)	Rich Kidd	3:50
17.	"Drop It Down" (featuring Redman)	Phraze & Rell	3:49

== Samples ==
- "On the Run" contains a sample of "California" by Phantom Planet
