= B-Boy Stance =

B-Boy Stance may refer to:

- a single by k-os, from the 2004 album Joyful Rebellion,
- a single by Cassidy, from the 2005 album I'm a Hustla.
