= Juno Awards of 2007 =

Edition of Canadian music award

- Date: 31 March-1 April 2007
- Venue: Credit Union Centre, Saskatoon, Saskatchewan
- Hosted by: Nelly Furtado

Television/radio coverage
- Network: CTV

The Juno Awards of 2007 were hosted in Saskatoon, Saskatchewan, Canada on the weekend ending 1 April 2007. These ceremonies honoured music industry achievements in Canada during most of 2006. The event was well known for a possible tape delay by the CTV television network so the network could syndicate The Amazing Race.

== Ceremonies ==
Most winners were announced at the Juno Gala Dinner and Awards ceremony on 31 March. This was a non-televised event conducted at TCU Place. At this event, Tom Jackson received the 2007 Humanitarian Award and Montreal-based music business veteran Donald K. Tarlton received the Walt Grealis Special Achievement Award. Gregory Charles, a Quebec-based musician, hosted this gala.

The primary ceremonies of the major awards originated from the Credit Union Centre on 1 April and televised throughout Canada on CTV. Host Nelly Furtado was also the most successful artist this year, winning in five categories: Album of the Year, Artist of the Year, Juno Fan Choice Award, Pop Album of the Year and Single of the Year.

Winners in the following categories were announced during the primary ceremonies:

- Album of the Year
- Group of the Year
- Juno Fan Choice Award
- New Artist of the Year
- R&B/Soul Recording of the Year
- Rock Album of the Year
- Single of the Year

== Telecast ==
CTV originally planned to provide a tape-delayed broadcast from 22:00 Eastern Daylight Time to accommodate an episode of the American version of The Amazing Race. However, the network relented due to opposition over the late timing, and scheduled the broadcast live from Ontario and eastward (19:00-21:00 Eastern) and tape delayed in western provinces (21:00-23:00 local time in British Columbia, Manitoba and Saskatchewan, 19:00-21:00 in Alberta). Quickly afterwards, the network made yet another change, allowing Saskatchewan viewers to watch the ceremony live (17:00 Central Standard) in addition to its previously scheduled timeslot.

National ratings for the Juno telecast were measured by BBM Nielsen at 912 000 viewers, an inferior result compared to the 966 000 viewers for Global's broadcast of The Simpsons or the 1.03 million viewers CBC gained from its airing of At Bertram's Hotel, an adaptation of the Agatha Christie mystery.

== Nominees and winners ==
Nominees were announced on 6 February 2007.

=== Artist of the Year ===
Winner: Nelly Furtado

Other nominees:

- Gregory Charles
- Diana Krall
- Pierre Lapointe
- Loreena McKennitt

=== Group of the Year ===
Winner: Billy Talent

Other nominees:

- Alexisonfire
- Hedley
- Three Days Grace
- The Tragically Hip

=== New Artist of the Year ===
Winner: Tomi Swick

Other nominees:

- Eva Avila
- Neverending White Lights
- Melissa O'Neil
- Patrick Watson

=== New Group of the Year ===
Winner: Mobile

Other nominees:

- Evans Blue
- Idle Sons
- Jets Overhead
- Stabilo

=== Jack Richardson Producer of the Year ===
Winner: Brian Howes, "Trip" (Hedley) and "Lips of an Angel" (Extreme Behavior)

Other nominees:

- Bob Rock, "In View" and "World Container" (The Tragically Hip)
- David Foster, "Un Giorno Per Noi (Romeo E Giulietta)" and "Un Dia Llegara" (Josh Groban)
- Julius "Juice" Butty, "Save Your Scissors" (City and Colour) and "This Could Be Anywhere in the World" (Alexisonfire)
- k-os, "The Rain" and "Sunday Morning"

=== Recording Engineer of the Year ===
Winner: John "Beetle" Bailey, "Rain" (Molly Johnson) and "Sisters of Mercy" (Serena Ryder)

Other nominees:

- David Travers-Smith, "The Devil's Paintbrush Road" and "Prairie Town" (The Wailin' Jennys)
- Eric Ratz, "Devil in a Midnight Mass" and "Red Flag" (Billy Talent)
- L. Stu Young, "Fury" and "3121" (Prince)
- Sheldon Zaharko, "Back Up on the Horse" (Barney Bentall) and "Unsung" (Jenny Whiteley)

=== Songwriter of the Year ===
Winner: Gordie Sampson, "Jesus Take the Wheel", "Words Get in the Way" and "Crybaby"

Other nominees:

- Sarah Harmer, "I Am Aglow", "Oleander" and "Escarpment Blues"
- k-os, "Sunday Morning", "The Rain" and "Flypaper"
- Nickelback, "Far Away", "If Everyone Cared" and "Rockstar"
- Ron Sexsmith, "All in Good Time", "Never Give Up" and "Hands of Time"

=== Fan Choice Award ===
Winner: Nelly Furtado

Other nominees:

- Michael Bublé
- Gregory Charles
- Sarah McLachlan
- Nickelback

=== Nominated albums ===
==== Album of the Year ====
Winner: Loose, Nelly Furtado

Other nominees:

- Billy Talent II, Billy Talent
- Hedley, Hedley
- I Think of You, Gregory Charles
- One-X, Three Days Grace

==== Aboriginal Recording of the Year ====
Winner: Sedzé, Leela Gilday

Other nominees:

- Blood Red Earth, Susan Aglukark
- Burn, Jason Burnstick
- Seeds, Digging Roots
- Stay Red, Northern Cree

==== Adult Alternative Album of the Year ====
Winner: The Light That Guides You Home, Jim Cuddy

Other nominees:

- I'm a Mountain, Sarah Harmer
- Living with War, Neil Young
- Time Being, Ron Sexsmith
- When the Angels Make Contact, Matt Mays

==== Alternative Album of the Year ====
Winner: Sometimes, City and Colour

Other nominees:

- Not Saying/Just Saying, Shout Out Out Out Out
- Return to the Sea, Islands
- Skelliconnection, Chad VanGaalen
- Trompe-l'oeil, Malajube

==== Blues Album of the Year ====
Winner: House of Refuge, Jim Byrnes

Other nominees:

- Acoustic, David Gogo
- Colin James & The Little Big Band 3, Colin James
- Easin' Back To Tennessee, Colin Linden
- The Way It Feels, Roxanne Potvin

==== CD/DVD Artwork Design of the Year ====
Winner: Chloe Lum and Yannick Desranleau, The Looks (MSTRKRFT)

Other nominees:

- Alexisonfire, Garnet Armstrong and Erno Rossi, Crisis (Alexisonfire)
- Tim Domoslai, Treeful of Starling (Hawksley Workman)
- Julien Mineau and Virginie Parr, Trompe-l'oeil (Malajube)
- Garnet Armstrong, Simon Paul, Linda Philp and Susan Michalek, World Container (The Tragically Hip)

==== Children's Album of the Year ====
Winner: My Beautiful World, Jack Grunsky

Other nominees:

- Dinosaurs, Dragons & Me, Donna & Andy
- Join the Band, Ken Whiteley
- Murmel Murmel Munsch!, Robert Munsch
- Snooze Music, Rick Scott

==== Contemporary Christian/Gospel Album of the Year ====
Winner: Wide-Eyed and Mystified, Downhere

Other nominees:

- Beauty in the Broken, Starfield
- Glory, Manafest
- Pollyanna's Attic, Carolyn Arends
- Smile, It's The End of the World, Hawk Nelson

==== Classical Album of the Year (large ensemble) ====
Winner: Mozart: Violin Concerti, James Ehnes and the Mozart Anniversary Orchestra

Other nominees:

- Mozart: Violin Concerti, Jon Kimura Parker/James Parker/Ian Parker/CBC Radio Orchestra/Mario Bernardi
- Rhapsodies, Alain Lefèvre and the Montreal Symphony Orchestra
- Saint-Saëns: Symphony No. 3 "Organ", Philippe Bélanger/Orchestre Métropolitain/Yannick Nézet-Séguin
- Shostakovich's Circle, I Musici de Montréal

==== Classical Album of the Year (solo or chamber ensemble) ====
Winner: Piazzolla, Jean-Marie Zeitouni and Les Violons du Roy

Other nominees:

- Mozart: Complete Piano Trios, The Gryphon Trio
- Mozart the Mason, Jonathan Crow, Douglas McNabney and Matt Haimovitz
- On the Threshold of Hope: Chamber Music by Mieczyslaw Weinberg, Artists of the Royal Conservatory
- Shostakovich: String Quartets 3, 7 & 8, St. Lawrence String Quartet

==== Classical Album of the Year (vocal or choral performance) ====
Winner: Mozart: Arie e Duetti, Isabel Bayrakdarian, Michael Schade and Russell Braun with the Canadian Opera Company Orchestra

Other nominees:

- Adrianne Pieczonka Sings Wagner and Strauss, Adrianne Pieczonka
- Extase, Measha Brueggergosman and the Orchestre symphonique de Québec
- Purcell, Karina Gauvin and Les Boréades
- Wagner: Arias, Ben Heppner

==== Francophone Album of the Year ====
Winner: Il était une fois dans l'est, Antoine Gratton

Other nominees:

- La Coeur dans la tête, Ariane Moffatt
- Compter les corps, Vulgaires Machins
- La Forêt des mal-aimés, Pierre Lapointe
- Trompe-l'oeil, Malajube

==== Instrumental Album of the Year ====
Winner: Run Neil Run, Sisters Euclid

Other nominees:

- ...and another thing, Joël Fafard
- Café Tropical, Johannes Linstead
- Recording a Tape the Colour of the Light, Bell Orchestre
- Yours Truly, Natalie MacMaster

==== International Album of the Year ====
Winner: Taking the Long Way, Dixie Chicks

Other nominees:

- Ancora, Il Divo
- Confessions on a Dance Floor, Madonna
- FutureSex/LoveSounds, Justin Timberlake
- Stadium Arcadium, Red Hot Chili Peppers

==== Contemporary Jazz Album of the Year ====
Winner: From the Heart, Hilario Durán and his Latin Jazz Big Band

Other nominees:

- At Sea, Ingrid Jensen
- Hugmars, Hugh Marsh
- Moment in Time, Richard Underhill
- Obsession, Kent Sangster

==== Traditional Jazz Album of the Year ====
Winner: Avenue Standard, Jon Ballantyne

Other nominees:

- Mnemosyne's March, Mike Murley and The David Braid Quartet
- Movin' and Groovin', Jake Langley
- Other Stories, William Carn
- ZHEN: The David Braid Sextet Live, Volume II, David Braid

==== Vocal Jazz Album of the Year ====
Winner: From This Moment On, Diana Krall

Other nominees:

- Calling for Rain, Lori Cullen
- Fight or Flight?, Kellylee Evans
- Messin' Around, Molly Johnson
- Start to Move, Elizabeth Shepherd

==== Pop Album of the Year ====
Winner: Loose, Nelly Furtado

Other nominees:

- Atlantis: Hymns for Disco, k-os
- Ghost Stories, Chantal Kreviazuk
- Stalled Out in the Doorway, Tomi Swick
- Wintersong, Sarah McLachlan

==== Rock Album of the Year ====
Winner: Billy Talent II, Billy Talent

Other nominees:

- Chemical City, Sam Roberts
- Never Hear the End of It, Sloan
- Tomorrow Starts Today, Mobile
- World Container, The Tragically Hip

==== Roots and Traditional Album of the Year (Solo) ====
Winner: Yellowjacket, Stephen Fearing

Other nominees:

- An Ancient Muse, Loreena McKennitt
- Milly's Cafe, Fred Eaglesmith
- We Belong to the Gold Coast, Steve Dawson
- When We Get There, Lennie Gallant

==== Roots and Traditional Album of the Year (Group) ====
Winner: Bloom, The McDades

Other nominees:

- Firecracker, The Wailin' Jennys
- Hello Love, Be Good Tanyas
- Let's Frolic, Blackie and the Rodeo Kings
- Migrations, The Dukhs

==== World Music Album of the Year ====
Winner: Kaba Horo, Lubo Alexandrov

Other nominees:

- African Guitar Summit II, Alpha Ya Ya Diallo, Mighty Popo, Adam Solomon, Pa Joe, Madagascar Slim and Donné Robert
- Bahiatronica, Monica Freire
- Coeur vagabond, Bïa
- The Edge, Mr. Something Something

=== Nominated releases ===
==== Single of the Year ====
Winner: "Promiscuous", Nelly Furtado featuring Timbaland

Other nominees:

- "All I Can Do", Chantal Kreviazuk
- "Devil in a Midnight Mass", Billy Talent
- "Pull Me Through", Jim Cuddy
- "Sunday Morning", k-os

==== Classical Composition of the Year ====
Winner: "Clere Vénus", Denis Gougeon

Other nominees:

- "A Midwinter Night's Dream", Harry Somers
- "Of Memory and Desire", Harry Somers
- "Tumbling Strain", Neil Currie
- "Varley Suite for Solo Violin", Stephen Chatman

==== Country Recording of the Year ====
Winner: Somebody Wrote Love, George Canyon

Other nominees:

- Big Wheel, Aaron Pritchett
- Countrified, Emerson Drive
- Doc Walker, Doc Walker
- Love & Negotiation, Carolyn Dawn Johnson

==== Dance Recording of the Year ====
Winner: Sexor, Tiga

Other nominees:

- "Airbreak", Danny D
- "Lift Off", Taras
- "(Maybe You'll Get) Lucky", The Sound Bluntz
- The Remix Album, Champion

==== Music DVD of the Year ====
Winner: Escarpment Blues, Sarah Harmer

Other nominees:

- It's Not Fun. Don't Do It!, Tegan and Sara
- Try This at Home, Hedley
- R30, Rush
- Rock Swings - Live, Paul Anka

==== R&B/Soul Recording of the Year ====
Winner: mySOUL, jacksoul

Other nominees:

- "Life Less Ordinary", Deesha
- "Believe", George
- "Face Behind The Face", Karl Wolf
- "Been Gone", Keshia Chanté

==== Rap Recording of the Year ====
Winner: Black Magic, Swollen Members

Other nominees:

- The Answer, Rich London
- The Frenzy of Renown, Arabesque
- Hitch Hikin' Music, Classified
- Organic Music for a Digital World, DL Incognito

==== Reggae Recording of the Year ====
Winner: Xrated, Korexion

Other nominees:

- Hard to See, Humble
- In the Streets, Trinity Chris feat. Blessed
- Kulcha Connection, Kulcha Connection
- Survival, Kwesi Selassie

=== Video of the Year ===
Winner: Dave Pawson and Jonathan Legris, "Bridge to Nowhere" (Sam Roberts)

Other nominees:

- Sean Michael Turrell, "Devil in a Midnight Mass" (Billy Talent)
- Floria Sigismondi, "Hurt" (Christina Aguilera)
- Drew Lightfoot, "Coast Is Clear" (In-Flight Safety)
- k-os, Micah Meisner and Zeb Roc, "ElectriK HeaT: The Seekwill" (k-os)

== Compilation CD ==
A compilation album of the awards was released in 2007

Track list

1. Nelly Furtado feat. Timbaland "Promiscuous" 4:03
2. k-os "Sunday Morning" 3:47
3. Chantal Kreviazuk "All I Can Do" 3:36
4. Sam Roberts "Bridge To Nowhere" 3:10
5. Billy Talent "Devil in a Midnight Mass" 2:54
6. Mobile "Montreal Calling" 3:07
7. Nickelback "Far Away" 3:59
8. Melissa O'Neil "Speechless" 4:04
9. Diana Krall "Little Girl Blue" 5:39
10. Loreena McKennitt "Caravanserai" 3:54
11. Pierre Lapointe "Deux Par Deux Rassemblés" 3:50
12. Jim Cuddy "Pull Me Through" 4:45
13. Eva Avila "Meant To Fly" 3:27
14. Stabilo "Flawed Design" 3:47
15. The Tragically Hip "In View" 3:59
16. Hedley "Gunnin'" 4:11
17. Three Days Grace "Animal I Have Become" 3:52
18. Alexisonfire "This Could Be Anywhere in the World" 4:02
