= The Anchorman Mixtape =

Mixtape by k-os
- Released: 9 August 2010
- Recorded: 2010
- Genre: Hip hop
- Length: 32:57
- Producer: k-os

K-os chronology
The Trill: A Journey So Far (2009)	The Anchorman Mixtape (2010)	MuchMusic Presents: k-os Live (2011)

The Anchorman Mixtape is a mixtape by Canadian hip-hop artist k-os which was released on August 9, 2010. Following the release of his album Yes! earlier in 2009, The mixtape features collaborations with Drake, Saukrates and Sebastien Grainger, among others.

== Background ==
Made available to download from his tour website, the mixtape was mostly recorded on k-os' tour bus while he was touring with Drake in April 2010. It incorporates snippets of the movie Anchorman: The Legend of Ron Burgundy. Providing Will Ferrell's voice as a narrator to the mixtape, each snippet relates to the track following it.

== Track listing ==
1. "Start Me UP" – 3:01
2. "SheClipse" – 3:17
3. "Faith" (featuring Drake) – 3:26
4. "Joni Mitchellin' Peelin Out" (featuring Saukrates) - 3:00
5. "Dance In YO Car" - 3:55
6. "BlackWater" (featuring Sebastien Grainger) - 3:15
7. "Holy Cow" - 3:54
8. "I Wish I Could Believe" - 2:52
9. "Beauty is a Loaded Gun" - 2:55
10. "The Lonely Ones" - 3:18

Sample credits:

- "Start Me UP" samples "Start Me Up" by The Rolling Stones
- "I Wish I Could Believe" samples "Mouthful of Diamonds" by Phantogram
- "Beauty is a Loaded Gun" samples "Chanson D'un Jour D'Hiver" by Cortex
