= Black on Blonde =

BLack on BLonde

Studio album by k-os
- Released: January 29, 2013
- Genres: Alternative hip-hop, rock
- Length: 36:44 (BLack); 27:06 (BLonde)
- Label: Crown Loyalist/EMI

K-os chronology
MuchMusic Presents: k-os Live (2011)	BLack on BLonde (2013)	Can't Fly Without Gravity (2015)

Black on Blonde (stylized as BLack on BLonde) is the fifth studio album by Canadian rapper k-os, released January 23, 2013 on Crown Loyalist and EMI Records. A double album, BLack on BLonde is divided into two discs, one consisting of hip-hop songs (BLack) and one consisting of rock songs (BLonde).

Guest musicians on the album include Emily Haines, Black Thought, Sebastien Grainger, Travie McCoy, Sam Roberts, Jay Malinowski, Saukrates, Shad and Corey Hart. George Stroumboulopoulos also provides a spoken intro to the track "The Dog Is Mine".

== Reception ==
Professional ratings
Aggregate scores
Source	Rating
Metacritic	66/100
Review scores
Source	Rating
AllMusic	3.5/5 stars
Exclaim!	7/10
Now	3/5 Ns
PopMatters	6/10

Black on Blonde received mixed to positive reviews from critics. On Metacritic, the album holds a score of 66/100 based on 4 reviews, indicating "generally favorable reviews".

== Track listing ==
=== Disc One: BLack ===
No.	Title	Producer(s)	Length
1.	"Like A Comet (We Rollin')" (featuring Corey Hart)	DJ Kemo & hAZEL	2:56
2.	"Diamond Sky"	Rich Kidd	3:16
3.	"NYCE 2 Know Ya"	T-Minus	2:57
4.	"C.L.A." (featuring Travie McCoy)	Phen Ray	3:40
5.	"Nobody Else"		5:00
6.	"One Time" (featuring Emily Haines)		4:08
7.	"Mojo On"		2:47
8.	"Try Again" (featuring Black Thought)	DJ Kemo & Vago	3:03
9.	"MTV"	Dream Team & Doc McKinney	4:04
10.	"Spraying My Pen" (featuring Saukrates and Shad)		4:53
Total length:			36:44

=== Disc Two: BLonde ===
No.	Title	Producer(s)	Length
1.	"The Dog Is Mine"	Roger Swan	3:58
2.	"Don't Touch" (featuring Sam Roberts)	Ryan Dahle	3:01
3.	"Alone in My Car"		3:42
4.	"Put Down Your Phone!"	Ryan Dahle	2:28
5.	"Billy Bragg Winners" (featuring Jay Malinowski)	Ryan Dahle	1:49
6.	"Surfs Up" (featuring Sebastien Grainger)	Sebastien Grainger	2:58
7.	"Play This Game"		2:57
8.	"Wonder Woman (As My Guitar Gently Streets)"		3:54
9.	"BLondes"	Ryan Dahle	2:19
Total length:			27:06
