= Brick House (EP) =

EP by Saukrates
- Released: February 5, 1997
- Recorded: 1995–1996
- Genre: Canadian hip hop
- Label: Serious; Capitol Hill
- Producer: Saukrates; No I.D.; Day

Saukrates chronology
Brick House (1997)	The Underground Tapes (1999)

Brick House is an EP by Canadian rapper Saukrates, released February 5, 1997 in the United States. It was released independently on Serious Entertainment and Capitol Hill Music. The EP was popular among underground hip hop fans, with 20,000 copies sold. It features appearances by American rappers Common, Masta Ace, and O.C. It also includes "Father Time" which was released as a 12" single in 1995.

== Track listing ==
=== 12" EP ===
A-side

#	Title	Producer(s)	Featured guest(s)
1.	"Play Dis"	Saukrates	Common
2.	"Play Dis (Instrumental)"	Saukrates	
3.	"Rollin"	Saukrates	Masta Ace and O.C.
4.	"Rollin (Remix)"	Saukrates	Masta Ace and O.C.

B-side

#	Title	Producer(s)	Featured guest(s)
1.	"P's & Q's"	Saukrates	
2.	"Play Dis (Remix)"	No I.D.	Common
3.	"Father Time (Remix)"	Day (co-produced by Saukrates)	
4.	"Father Time"	Day (co-produced by Saukrates)	
