= Idle Sons =

Canadian rock band

- Origin: Burlington, Ontario, Canada
- Genres: Rock
- Years active: 1994–2007
- Label: EMI Canada
- Past members: Mike Eastick; Sean Kelly; Bruce Nicol; Ryan Barkwell

Idle Sons was a Canadian rock music group from Burlington, Ontario, most noted as a Juno Award nominee for New Group of the Year at the Juno Awards of 2007.

== Biography ==
Idle Sons was a Burlington, Ontario-based rock band that has earned a devoted following in Canada and beyond. The group was formed in 1994 by childhood friends Mike Eastick, Sean Kelly, Jer Crosskill, and Bruce Nicol. Jer Crosskill left the band shortly after its inception, and was replaced by Ryan Barkwell. Mike and Sean were on the same line on their hockey team while Bruce and Ryan were pitcher/catcher combination during baseball season. The group originally took the name Slurpymundae under which they toured extensively and released two EPs and one full-length album independently.

In the year 2001, after returning home from a cross-Canada tour with fellow Burlington band, Finger Eleven, the group set to work recording a three-song demo. Friends James Black and Rick Jackett of Finger Eleven were enlisted to produce the demo. At this time, the group began to feel that the name Slurpymundae did not have a future and so they made the switch to Idle Sons. Around this time the group also signed on with Coalition Entertainment manager Julian Gruhl.

Upon hearing the three-song demo, Atlantic Records A&R Rep Kevin Carvel quickly brought the group to the attention of the label. The band signed their first major label recording contract with Atlantic Records and flew to Los Angeles to record their debut album with producer Gavin Mackillop. After six months of recording, the group had completed their debut effort. It was to be called Hell or High Water.

Soon after the completion of the debut Idle Sons album, Atlantic Records changed ownership (an internet company had owned the label, and it was sold to private interests). This change in ownership led to the reorganization of many positions within the company and the departure of Kevin Williamson to Maverick Records. As a result of this, Idle Sons were dropped and their record was handed back to them.

Despite the disappointment, Idle Sons would carry on with an intense regimen of songwriting and touring. After almost four years of writing and touring independently, the band signed a deal with EMI Canada. The band soon departed for Vancouver where they would work on their EMI debut at The Farm, the oceanfront, 14-acre (57,000 m^{2}) studio complex run by producer GGGarth (Garth Richardson), the studio whiz whose credits include Rage Against the Machine, Trapt, Chevelle, Rise Against, Mudvayne, Kittie, L7 and many others. The sessions would last for 20 days and the album Sixteen Seasons was the result.

On May 2, 2006, EMI Canada released Idle Sons' Sixteen Seasons. The record comprises three different types of songs: four tracks ("Bleeding," "This Evening," "Long Way Home", and "Before the Fall") survived intact from the never-released Hell or High Water. Four more ("Waiting Around," "Good Life," "Better Days" – the track that long-time fans might remember as "Push" – and "Now Forever") were reworked from their original Hell or High Water form. The final four songs (the first single "Tell Me," "Getaway," "Little Bit Less", and "Maggot") are all brand new, all products of the various jams from that seemingly endless period of limbo. Two were demoed just two weeks before the recording sessions began.

From February to December 2006, the band toured Canada in support of Sixteen Seasons with: Default, Rocketface, The Trews, Seether, Thornley, Simple Plan, Latefallen, Three Days Grace, Mobile, Marianas Trench, Rides Again, Thirty Seconds to Mars, Our Lady Peace, The Tragically Hip, Waking Eyes, Ill Scarlet, Hedley, the Planet Smashers, Breach of Trust, Oliver Black, Finger Eleven, Mayor McCa, No Motiv and Theory of a Deadman.

The first single, "Tell Me," cracked the Top 20 for rock radio in Canada in July 2006.

In late December 2006, Sean left the band to pursue a career in teaching. His last show with the band was on December 16, 2006 in London, Ontario at the Salt Lounge.

The band has been nominated for a (CRMA) Canadian Radio Music Award and a Juno Award for New Group of the Year in 2007 but on March 9, 2007, the band announced its dissolution.

Former lead singer, Mike Eastick, passed away on August 9, 2023.

== Line-up ==
- Mike Eastick (Guitar, Vocals)
- Sean Kelly (Guitar, Vocals)
- Bruce Nicol (Bass Guitar)
- Ryan Barkwell (Drums, Percussion)
- Jer Crosskill (Drums - 1994)
- Brendan Mowat-Smith (Guitar Jan 2007–March 2007)
- Matt Grier (Cowbell)

== Discography ==
=== Albums ===
- Splurge (1995) (As Slurpymundae - Cassette)
- Sifter EP (1996) (As Slurpymundae)
- The Sik Whisper (1998) (As Slurpymundae)
- Slurpymundae EP (2001) (As Slurpymundae)
- Hell or High Water (2003) (1. Waiting Around; 2.Now Forever; 3. Long Way Home)
- Sixteen Seasons (May 2, 2006)

Sixteen Seasons track listing

1. Little Bit Less
2. Tell Me
3. Maggot
4. Now Forever
5. Waiting Around
6. Getaway
7. This Evening
8. Bleeding
9. Before The Fall
10. Better Days
11. The Good Life
12. Long Way Home

=== Singles ===
- "Tell Me" from Sixteen Seasons (2006)
- "Waiting Around" from Sixteen Seasons (2006)
- "Maggot" from Sixteen Seasons (2006)
