= Stalled Out in the Doorway =

Studio album by Tomi Swick
- Released: August 15, 2006

Tomi Swick chronology
Stalled Out in the Doorway (2006)	Tomi Swick (2010)

Stalled Out in the Doorway is the debut album by Canadian singer-songwriter Tomi Swick, released on August 15, 2006. The album was nominated for Pop Album of the Year at the 2007 Juno Awards.

== Track listing ==
1. "Come in 2s"
2. "Wait Until Morning"
3. "Everything Is Alright"
4. "Still in the Light"
5. "I Trust In (Family)"
6. "Sorry Again"
7. "Habits"
8. "A Night Like This"
9. "Listen Isa"
10. "Easy Company"
11. "I'll See You Again"
12. "Stalled Out in the Doorway"
