= Checkmate (rapper) =

Canadian rapper

- Born: Lyle Bismark
- Genre: Hip hop
- Occupations: Rapper, record producer
- Years active: 1993–present
- Labels: Natural Game Records, Double Up (former)

Checkmate is a Canadian rapper from Vancouver, best known as one of the collaborating artists on Rascalz' influential 1998 single "Northern Touch". He is also a Juno Award nominee for Rap Recording of the Year for his single "R.A.W." at the Juno Awards of 2003.

== History ==
Checkmate recorded over 200 underground tracks including the singles "Signs of War", "The Longshot" and "Bait & Switch (Money & Music)" before appearing on "Northern Touch." He then compiled some of the songs for the 2001 album Welcome to the Game, which was released on Double Up Records. "R.A.W." was released as a standalone non-album single the following year and garnered Checkmate his Juno Award nomination in 2003.

He has released several solo recordings after "R.A.W.", and was a featured collaborator on other artists' singles. Checkmate produced the compilation "Game Related" and released it through Natural Game Records in 2005. In 2008, Checkmate released the "African Kings" album in collaboration with Concise The Black Knight as the Defenders of the Faith. Both projects were re-released on Spotify. In 2011, the Defenders released the mixtape, 'The G'z Next Door 2' hosted by DJ Dow Jones exclusively on Datpiff.

His 2019 album entitled "Hustle Game 101," featured guest appearances by Jay Worthy, JD Era and it was hosted by Vago. Checkmate continues to release singles on Spotify.

In 2021, Checkmate released his fourth solo album, 'Aviator Game', on all platforms through Natural Game Records and Vanguards Music. The project included guest appearances from Concise, Snak the Ripper, Bishop Brigante, Moka Only, Tre Nyce and Tiago Vasquez. The album was executively produced by DJ Kemo of the Rascalz. He participated in the Northern Touch All-Stars' set at the CBC Music Festival in 2018, performing his solo singles "R.A.W." and "These Days & Times" and in the group's performance of "Northern Touch".

He also appeared with the Northern Touch All-Stars when the group presented the Rap Recording of the Year award at the Juno Awards of 2018 and performed a rendition of "Northern Touch" in lieu of the acceptance speech by absent winner Tory Lanez.

== Discography ==
Studio albums

- Welcome To The Game (2000)
- Checkmate Presents... Game Related (2003)
- Hustle Game 101 (with Vago) (2009)
- Aviator Game (2021) (with DJ Kemo)
- Advanced Game (2021)
- Pro Game (2023)
- Pro Game 2 (2025)
- The Method (with K-Rec) (2026)

EP’s

- Inference and Hearsay (with K-Rec and Moka Only) (2024)

Defenders of The Faith

- African Kings (2008)
- Pandemic (2008)
- Power and Glory (2009)
- The G'z Next Door (2010)
- The G'z Next Door 2 (2011)
