= 4, 3, 2, 1 (k-os song) =

Single by k-os

from the album Yes!
- Released: December 2008
- Recorded: 2008
- Genre: Hip hop
- Length: 3:55
- Label: EMI, Virgin Records
- Songwriter(s): k-os

K-os singles chronology
"Equalizer" (2007)	"4, 3, 2, 1" (2008)	"Burning Bridges" (2009)

"4, 3, 2, 1" is the first single by k-os from the album Yes!. The music video premièred in February 2009. The song samples "Soul Flower (Remix)" by The Pharcyde.

== Peak chart positions ==
Chart (2009)	Peak position
Canadian Hot 100	98
