= Agile (producer) =

- Born: Ajene Griffith; Toronto, Ontario, Canada
- Origin: Toronto, Ontario, Canada
- Genres: Hip hop; R&B
- Occupations: Record producer; DJ; songwriter
- Years active: 1999–present
- Label: Universal Music Publishing
- Member of: BrassMunk
- Formerly of: Big Black Lincoln
- Website: Official website

Ajene Griffith, better known as DJ Agile, is a Canadian hip-hop producer and DJ from Toronto, Ontario. He is a member of the groups BrassMunk and Big Black Lincoln.

== Biography ==
Agile began rapping in high school and decided to pursue music more seriously after winning several talent shows, earning him recognition across Toronto. He later co-founded JLJ Productions, a DJ crew he formed with his friends.

By the end of high school, Agile has been DJing independently and with his crew, performing for college and commercial radio stations throughout Toronto. He developed an interest in music production during this period and has since done production work for numerous artists, including Nas, Kardinal Offishall, Melanie Fiona, Dwele, Jully Black, Glenn Lewis, Ivana Santilli, and Frank n Dank.

In 2009, Agile released a mixtape Toronto Love Jay dedicated to the late producer J Dilla, which won Mixtape of the Year at the 2009 Stylus DJ Awards. Since then, Agile has obtained many prominent DJing gigs, including DJing for the Toronto Maple Leafs' "Rivalry Series" two years in a row, opening for Drake's 2022 OVO Fest "Canadian AllStars", producing the music for season three (2019) and season four (2020) of Netflix's Hip Hop Evolution, and representing Canada in Ho Chi Minh City, Vietnam, for the Smirnoff Nightlife Exchange Program, where Vietnamese partygoers experienced Canadian-inspired nightlife.

Between April 2010 and December 2015, Agile served as the Dean For Recording Arts at the Toronto Chapter of The Remix Project. Agile has served as a board member of the SOCAN Foundation since 2009, chaired the Pop Music Committees, and has sat on the Jazz Festival Advisory Committee since January 2017.

== Discography ==
Year	Release	Artist	Label
2021	"Bad Behaviour"	Ammoye	Ammoye Music
2021	"Nerve (DJ Agile Remix)"	AJA	Set Records Inc.
2021	"Underyourskin"	Dayton James	DJ&Co
2020	We're Never Done	Agile	CLK/Agile Music
2020	"Light Me Up"	Agile	CLK/Agile Music
2019	"Flavor"	Agile feat. Ammoye	CLK/Agile Music
2018	"Alone Again"	Agile ft.Sacha Williamson	Tokyo Dawn Records
2017	"High Off"	Agile feat. Desiire	Tokyo Dawn Records
2017	"Lovers"	Agile feat. Sacha Williamson	Tokyo Dawn Records
2015	"Insert Here"	Kardinal Offishall ft. Haley Smalls	Black Stone Colleagues/Universal Music Canada
2014	"Chemical Romance"	King Reign	Independent
2010	"Focused" (Middlefield's Focal Length RMX)	Agile feat. Liya	Independent
2010	"Focused" (Middlefield's Skool of Deep RMX)	Agile feat. Liya	Independent
2010	"Focused" (Starting From Scratch/De La Vega RMX)	Agile feat. Liya	Independent
2010	"Focused"	Agile feat. Liya	Independent
2008	"The Realest Pt. II"	Agile feat. Frank n Dank, Tona, and Famous	Independent
2008	"The Realest (Clean)"	Agile feat. Frank n Dank	Independent
2007	FEWturistic	BrassMunk	54th/Virgin Music Canada
2006	"Everybody Knows"	Chris Rouse	Contessa Group
2006	Heaven's Caught on Fire	Big Black Lincoln	Capitol Hill/Universal Music Canada
2006	"Freeze Fool"	BrassMunk	54th/Virgin Music Canada
2005	"Ease Up!"	BrassMunk	54th/Virgin Music Canada
2005	"Livin' in the Ghetto"	Jully Black	Universal Music Canada
2005	"The Things You Do"	Jully Black	Universal Music Canada
2004	"Claim the World" (Olympic Fundraiser)	Glenn Lewis, Saukrates, BrassMunk, Ivana Santilli, and Chris Rouse	CBC
2004	Rhyme Pays (Documentary)	—	CBC
2004	"Everlasting"	Ivana Santilli	Brown Recordings
2002	Dark Sunrise	BrassMunk	54th/Virgin Music Canada
2002	"Heaven"	Nas feat. Jully Black (God's Son)	Columbia
2002	"Train"	Choclair	Greenhouse
2001	"Get Right"	BrassMunk	Heavy Heads/Fat Beats
2000	"Live Ordeal!"	BrassMunk	A/R/Fat Beats
1999	"One, 2"	BrassMunk	BrassMunk
1999	"Rap Sheet"	Assasini	Heavy Heads/Fat Beats

== Awards, nominations and achievements ==
Year	Category	Result
2011	Smirnoff Nightlife Exchange Project	Ho Chi Minh City, Vietnam
2010	Stylus DJ Awards, Mixtape of the Year	Nominee, Lov Lane
2009	Stylus DJ Awards, Mixtape of the Year	Winner, Toronto Love Jay
2008	Juno Awards, Best Rap Recording	Nominee, FEWturistic, BrassMunk
2005	MuchMusic Video Awards, Best Rap Video	Nominee, "Dark Sunrise", BrassMunk
2004	Juno Awards, Best Rap Recording	Nominee, Dark Sunrise, BrassMunk
2004	Juno Awards, Best R&B/Soul Recording	Nominee, "Pimpin' Life", Big Black Lincoln
2004	MuchMusic Video Awards, Best Independent Video	Nominee, "The Throwback", Tone Mason feat. BrassMunk, G-Stokes, and Graph Nobel
2004	MuchMusic Video Awards, Best Rap Video	Nominee, "Big", BrassMunk
2003	Juno Awards, Best Rap Recording	Nominee, "El Dorado", BrassMunk
2003	MuchMusic Video Awards, Best Animated Music Video	Nominee, "El Dorado", BrassMunk
2002	MuchMusic Video Awards, Best Rap Video	Nominee, "El Dorado", BrassMunk
2002	North By North East (NXNE)	Rising Star Award, BrassMunk
2000	Juno Awards, Best Rap Recording	Nominee, "Live Ordeal!", BrassMunk
