= The Underground Tapes =

Studio album by Saukrates
- Released: June 22, 1999
- Recorded: 1996–1999
- Genre: Canadian hip hop
- Length: 44:50
- Label: Serious; Capitol Hill
- Producer: Chase Parsons (exec.); Saukrates (also exec.); Mike Caren (also exec.); Mr. Attic; Day

Saukrates chronology
Brick House (1997)	The Underground Tapes (1999)	Season One (2012)

Alternative cover
- Cover of the Canadian re-release.

Singles from The Underground Tapes
- 1. "Money or Love" Released: 1999

The Underground Tapes is the debut studio album by Canadian rapper and producer Saukrates, which was released June 22, 1999 in the United States through independent labels Serious Entertainment and Capitol Hill Music. In late summer 1999, the album was re-released in Canada with six additional tracks. Production was handled by Saukrates, Mr. Attic, Mike Caren, and Day. Three songs from the album—"Innovations", "Play Dis (99 Remix)", and "Rollin"—are remixes. The only single from the album was "Money or Love", which was nominated for a Juno Award in 2000.

Mike Shinoda, the co-vocalist of Linkin Park, designed the album cover, as it was shown in the band's first documentary DVD called Frat Party at the Pankake Festival, which was released on November 20, 2001, from a short video clip entitled "Mike & Joe's Art" that can be seen from the "Special Features" menu.

The album was re-released onto streaming services as the Canadian version, followed by eight additional tracks including remixes, on August 23, 2024.

== Reception ==
Professional ratings
Review scores
Source	Rating
Allmusic	3/5 stars
MVRemix	7.5/10

Allmusic stated "Influenced by the quintessential N.Y. sound of old, Saukrates' self-produced jazzy synthesizers and organic string sections permeate with a native-tongues vibe. But it's lyrically where Saukrates distinguishes himself, as his flow and domineering habitation on the mike is utterly hypnotic."

== Track listing ==
#	Title	Producer(s)	Featured guest(s)	Length
1.	"Intro"			1:12
2.	"Can't Touch Us"	Saukrates (co-produced by Mr. Attic)		3:52
3.	"Money or Love"	Saukrates		4:18
4.	"Bag da Biscuit"	Saukrates		2:40
5.	"Da Professional"	Saukrates		5:57
6.	"Keep It Movin"	Saukrates	Xzibit	3:23
7.	"Innovations"	Saukrates	Pharoahe Monch	3:59
8.	"Fine Line"	Saukrates		2:35
9.	"Play Dis (99 Remix)"	Saukrates	Common	3:35
10.	"Body Language"	Mr. Attic	Choclair	4:08
11.	"Check for Me"	Saukrates		4:35
12.	"Ultimate Rush"	Mike Caren	Heltah Skeltah	3:03
13.	"Rollin"	Saukrates	Masta Ace and O.C.	4:13

The Canadian re-release features six additional tracks.

#	Title	Producer(s)	Length
14.	"Suga Daddy"	Saukrates	3:54
15.	"Bag da Biscuit (Ain't Nuttin But A....)"	Saukrates	3:47
16.	"Vietnam"	Saukrates	3:56
17.	"Killed or Be Killed"	Saukrates	3:15
18.	"Ay, Ay, Ay"	Saukrates	3:48
*	"Father Time" (hidden track)	Day (co-produced by Saukrates)	4:22

== Samples ==
- "Da Professional" contains a sample of "On the Hill" by Oliver Sain
- "Check for Me" contains a sample of "(If Loving You Is Wrong) I Don't Want to Be Right" by Ramsey Lewis

== Personnel ==
- Greg Barrett – mixer
- Mike Caren – producer, executive producer, mixer
- Choclair – performer
- Heltah Skeltah – performer
- Saukrates – producer, executive producer
- Xzibit – performer
- Common – performer
- Mike Shinoda – artwork
- Chase Parsons – executive producer
