= Reloaded (Rascalz album) =

Studio album by Rascalz
- Released: 2002
- Genre: Canadian hip hop
- Label: Sub Word/Sony Music Canada/ViK.
- Producer: DJ Kemo, Tone Mason

Rascalz chronology
Global Warning (1999)	Reloaded (2002)

Singles from Reloaded
- 1. "Crazy World" Released: 2002; 2. "Movie Star" Released: 2002

Reloaded is the fourth studio album by Canadian hip hop group Rascalz, released in 2002. The album debuted at #22 on the Canadian Albums Chart. The single was also a success in Germany reaching #14 on the German Black Music Chart. Reloaded was among the top 30 best-selling rap albums in Canada in 2002 and the third best-selling rap album of the year by a Canadian rap artist.

== Track listing ==
1. "Intro"
2. "Jungle"
3. "Crazy World" (feat. Notch and Sazon Diamonte)
4. "Stop Drop"
5. "One Shot" (feat. K-os)
6. "Warrior" (feat. Notch)
7. "Dun Did It" (feat. IRS & Tara Chase)
8. "Interlude"
9. "Movie Star"
10. "Flithy" (feat. Checkmate & Concise)
11. "Clash (We Don't Play)" (feat. Sugar Prince & Jah-Fus)
12. "Fiyah!" (feat. East Juvi & Kardinal Offishall)
13. "Send Fi Dem"
14. "Hit Em Up" (feat. Kardinal Offishall, Solitair & YLook)
15. "Respect It" (feat. Mag-T from Grimmi Grimmi)
16. "Murderah" (feat. Jah-Fus)
17. "Politricks (Outro)"

== Year-end charts ==
Chart (2002)	Position
Canadian R&B Albums (Nielsen SoundScan)	55
Canadian Rap Albums (Nielsen SoundScan)	30
