= Northern Touch =

Single by Rascalz featuring Kardinal Offishall, Checkmate, Thrust and Choclair

from the album Cash Crop
- B-side: "Solitaire"
- Released: 1998
- Recorded: 1997
- Genre: Canadian hip hop
- Length: 4:06
- Label: Figure IV/ViK./BMG
- Songwriters: L. Bismark, K. Blake, C. France, J. Harrow, R. Jacobs, B. Leonard
- Producer: DJ Kemo

Rascalz singles chronology
"Dreaded Fist" (1997)	"Northern Touch" (1998)	"Sharpshooter" (1999)

Checkmate singles chronology
"Northern Touch" (1998)	"Signs of War" (1999)

Kardinal Offishall singles chronology
"On wit da Show" (1997)	"Northern Touch" (1998)	"And What?" (1999)

Thrust singles chronology
"Rage" (1996)	"Northern Touch" (1998)	"Emcee" (1998)

Choclair singles chronology
"What It Takes" (1997)	"Northern Touch" (1998)	"Let's Ride" (1999)

"Northern Touch" is a Canadian hip hop single, which was released in 1998 by Rascalz in collaboration with Checkmate, Kardinal Offishall, Thrust and Choclair. It is one of the most important individual songs in the history of Canadian hip hop, which almost singlehandedly transformed the genre from a largely ignored underground movement into a viable commercial endeavour.

The participating artists have also been collectively credited in later coverage as Northern Touch All-Stars.

== Background ==
At the end of the 1980s and beginning of the 1990s, several Canadian hip hop musicians, including Maestro Fresh Wes, Devon and Dream Warriors, had significant chart hits, but there were to be difficult years ahead. Milestone Radio applied to the CRTC for an urban music station in Toronto in 1990, which would have been Canada's first radio station devoted to that format, but was denied in favour of a country music station. The Canadian music industry had a poor history with Black Canadian musicians, and the Milestone decision was the final nail in the coffin: after 1991, there wasn't another Canadian hip hop song on the pop charts for over half a decade.

== Creation and impact ==
Rascalz, who had recorded their first album in 1993, survived the 1990s by learning the business aspects of the music industry, operating their own independent label as well as touring and performing. Following their 1997 album Cash Crop, they wrote "Northern Touch" as a sort of anthem for Canadian hip hop's resilience and determination, inviting several other guest musicians to perform on the track. The song was also originally scheduled to include k-os and Jully Black, who cancelled due to other commitments. The track had originally been planned for a hip hop compilation album, but the musicians decided to release it as a single after the album was cancelled.

The song garnered radio airplay throughout North America, becoming Canadian hip hop's first hit song since 1991.

It was not on the original pressings of Cash Crop, but was quickly added to follow up pressings of the album, due to its popularity.

=== Awards ===
Cash Crop won the Juno Award for Best Rap Recording in 1998, but Rascalz refused the award because it was presented in the non-televised portion of the ceremony along with the technical awards. The award was moved to the main ceremony in 1999. Rascalz won the award again, this time for "Northern Touch" itself, and performed the song live at the ceremony.

The song's video also won the MuchMusic Video Award for Best Rap Video.

At the Juno Awards of 2018, the creators of "Northern Touch" were selected to present the Rap Recording of the Year award, and performed an impromptu a cappella rendition of the song on stage.

=== Raptors mix ===
In 2018, Kardinal Offishall produced and released a remix of the song as a theme for Sportsnet broadcasts of Toronto Raptors games in the 2018 NBA Playoffs. Collaborating with Sportsnet producers Paul Sidhu, Mark Wade, George Skoutakis, John Woo and Ryan Knight, the group received a Canadian Screen Award nomination for Best Sports Opening at the 7th Canadian Screen Awards in 2019.

== Sample ==
The song samples "Everything Good to You (Ain't Always Good for You)" by B.T. Express. “Coincidentally”, American rapper DMX also released a single in 1998, "Get At Me Dog", which used the same B.T. Express sample.

== Music video ==
The song's video was one of the first music videos directed by Director X, and one of the first film appearance by actress and model Melyssa Ford.

== Track listing ==
=== 12" single ===
A-side

1. "Northern Touch"
2. "Northern Touch" (Remix)
3. "Northern Touch" (Accapella)

B-side

1. "Solitaire" (Remix)
2. "Solitaire" (Remix Instrumental)
3. "Solitaire" (Remix Accapella)
