= Can't Fly Without Gravity =

Studio album by k-os
- Released: September 4, 2015
- Genre: Alternative hip hop
- Length: 42:53
- Language: English
- Label: Dine Alone Records

K-os chronology
BLack on BLonde (2013)	Can't Fly Without Gravity (2015)

Can't Fly Without Gravity is the sixth studio album by Canadian hip-hop artist k-os. The album originally was to be released on August 28, 2015, through Dine Alone Records, but was pushed back until September 4, 2015. The entire album was released over Spotify prior to its release date. The album cover is a reference to the poster of the 1983 film Vacation. The album was nominated for Rap Recording of the Year at the Juno Awards of 2016.

== Background ==
=== Naming ===
In an interview with Global News on August 26, 2015, k-os indicated that the title paralleled the negativity of "haters" to the downward force of gravity. In both situations, one must deal with these forces to go beyond them. He succinctly expressed the notion saying, "the forces which pull you down are simply put there to inspire you to rise above them."

=== Singles ===
My Canadian accent set me apart from kids [in Trinidad]—they used to say ‘Yankee go home’ and stuff like that. I didn’t fit in, but going back opened up a well of passion," says k-os. "This new single, which is raw, could only be this way because I feel new. And to feel new to a style sometimes you have to step away from it. Can’t Fly Without Gravity is the sound of somebody who’s consciously forgotten about pop music to understand it again. We all need to forget something that we like so that we can like it again.

— k-os, on "WiLD4TheNight (Ego Land)"

On August 6, 2014, the track "WiLD4TheNight (Ego Land)" was released. The song was written in Trinidad; the music video was shot there as well.

== Track listing ==
No.	Title	Producer(s)	Length
1.	"Snapback"	k-os	1:28
2.	"WiLD4TheNight (EgoLand)"	Donald "hAZEL" Sales	4:44
3.	"Dance in Yo Car"	k-os, Phen Ray	3:18
4.	"Hussle & Flow"	k-os	3:43
5.	"Get Up"	EL Jay II	3:02
6.	"Crucify"	k-os	3:17
7.	"Vous Deux (Denzel Washington)"	k-os	2:06
8.	"Boyz II Men" (featuring Saukrates, Shad, Kardinal Offishall, Choclair & King Reign)	k-os	5:37
9.	"Rap Zealot"	k-os	1:09
10.	"Spaceship"	Illangelo	3:31
11.	"Turn Me Loose"	k-os	3:36
12.	"Steel Sharpens Steel"	k-os	3:33
13.	"Another Shot (A.S)"	Saint Garcon	3:49
Total length:			42:53
