= Cash Crop (album) =

Studio album by Rascalz
- Released: 1997
- Genre: Canadian hip hop
- Label: ViK./Figure IV
- Producer: DJ Kemo, Flipout

Rascalz chronology
Really Livin' (1993)	Cash Crop (1997)	Global Warning (1999)

Singles from Cash Crop
- 1. "Blind Wid the Science" Released: 1995; 2. "Soul Obligation" Released: 1997; 3. "Dreaded Fist" Released: 1997; 4. "Northern Touch" Released: 1998

Professional ratings
Review scores
Source	Rating
AllMusic	4/5 stars
RapReviews	7/10

Cash Crop is an album by the Canadian hip hop group Rascalz, released in 1997 on ViK. Recordings. The album is the group's most successful record to date and was certified gold by CRIA with sales of over 50,000 copies across Canada.

== Northern Touch ==
The album's most notable track, "Northern Touch", was not on the original 1997 pressing of the album, but was released as a one-off non-album single in 1998. After it unexpectedly became one of the biggest hit songs in the history of Canadian hip hop, it was added to later pressings of the album.

== Awards ==
Cash Crop was named the winner of the Juno Award for Best Rap Recording at the Juno Awards of 1998. However, the award was presented during the non-televised portion of the ceremony along with the technical awards, rather than at the televised main ceremony. Alleging that racism was a factor in the award's scheduling, the band refused to accept the award. Speaking to the press afterward, the group and their co-manager said that

In view of the lack of real inclusion of black music in this ceremony, this feels like a token gesture towards honoring the real impact of urban music in Canada. Urban music, reggae, R&B, and rap, that's all black music, and it's not represented [at the Junos]. We decided that until it is, we were going to take a stance.

The album was shortlisted for the Polaris Heritage Prize at the 2025 Polaris Music Prize.

== Track listing ==
1. "Temptation"
2. "Solitaire Remix"
3. "Dreaded Fist"
4. "Soul Obligation"
5. "Clockwork"
6. "Anatomy"
7. "A Way With Words"
8. "Fitnredi"
9. "Strange Brew"
10. "No Idea"
11. "Chat Bout"
12. "Mood Swings"
13. "Blind Wid the Science"
14. "Shock Therapy"
15. "Shouts"
16. "Solitaire"
17. "Outro"
18. "Northern Touch" (featuring Checkmate, Kardinal Offishall, Thrust, and Choclair)

== Charts ==
Chart (1997)	Peak position
Canadian RPM Albums Chart	81
