= Capitol Hill Music =

Canadian independent record label

- Founded: Late 1990s
- Founder: Saukrates; Chase Parsons
- Genre: R&B hip hop
- Country of origin: Canada
- Location: Toronto, Ontario, Canada

Capitol Hill Music is a Canadian independent record label, specializing in hip-hop and R&B music.

The Toronto-based label was founded in the mid 1990s by rapper Saukrates, and his manager Chase Parsons. In 1997, the label released Kardinal Offishall's debut album, Eye & I. Two years later, the label released Saukrates' debut album, The Underground Tapes. In the 2000s, Saukrates produced records for his group Big Black Lincoln, and R&B singer Andreena Mill.

== See also ==
- List of record labels
