= Rich London =

- Born: Toronto, Ontario
- Origin: Canada
- Occupation: Rapper

Rich London (born Richard Davidson) is a rapper from Toronto, Ontario, currently signed to Soul Clap Records/Universal Music. Canadian hip hop legend Maestro Fresh Wes is his cousin. His 2006 release The Answer was nominated for Rap Recording of the Year at the 2007 Juno Awards with music videos released in 2006 such as The Answer feat. Shantall and Side To Side.
