= Tomi Swick =

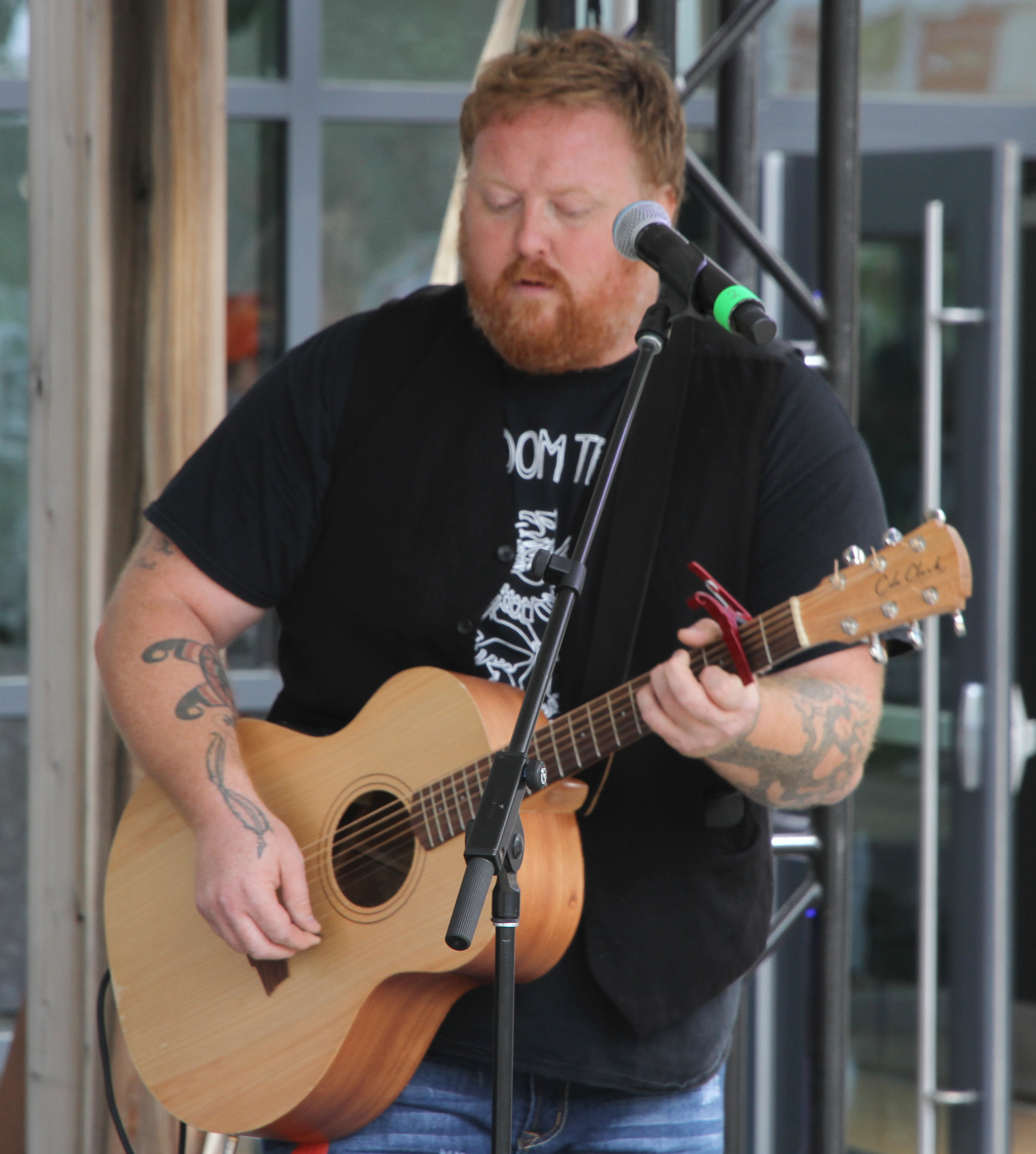
- 2016 CFC Annual BBQ Fundraiser performer and Slaight Music artist Tomi Swick.

Background information
- Born: Hamilton, Ontario, Canada
- Genres: Pop rock
- Occupation: Singer-songwriter
- Years active: 2004–present
- Labels: Warner, Slaight Music
- Website: TomiSwick.com

Tomi Swick is a Canadian singer-songwriter from Hamilton, Ontario formerly signed to Warner Music Canada, now signed to Slaight Music.

By age 13, Swick had learned to play several instruments, including the bagpipes, military drums, piano and guitar. At age 19 he began playing in a Hamilton band but soon pursued a solo career. He is a graduate of Cathedral High School. In February 2006, Swick's song "A Night Like This" was released as the first single from the compilation album From the Heart. The single became a top-five radio hit in Canada.

In 2006, Swick released his debut album, Stalled Out in the Doorway, which entered the chart at number 77. The singles "Everything Is Alright" and "Sorry Again" received moderate video play on Much Music and MuchMoreMusic. At the 2007 Juno Awards, Swick was awarded New Artist of the Year.

From January 1, 2007, to February 26, 2007, Swick toured with the Barenaked Ladies on their BLAM tour.

Swick also contributed to two songs on the album 68 by Year of the Monkey. He wrote and performed on the song "Leaving You Behind" and covered John Lennon's "Dear Prudence".

His second album was released on March 27, 2012.

His third album, The Yukon Motel, was released on October 16, 2016, on Slaight Music.

== Albums ==
- 2006: Stalled Out in the Doorway
- 2010: Tomi Swick
- 2016: The Yukon Motel

== Singles ==
- "A Night Like This"
- "Everything Is Alright"
- "Sorry Again"
- "Easy Company"
