= Global Warning (Rascalz album) =

Studio album by Rascalz
- Released: October 26, 1999
- Genre: Canadian hip-hop
- Length: 1:12:45
- Label: Figure IV; Vik
- Producer: Bobby Brass; DJ Kemo; Jay-Rome; K-os; KRS-One; Misfit; Psycho Les; Red 1; The Alchemist

Rascalz chronology
Cash Crop (1997)	Global Warning (1999)	Reloaded (2002)

Singles from Global Warning
- 1. "Sharpshooter (Best of the Best)" Released: 1999; 2. "Top of the World" Released: 1999

Professional ratings
Review scores
Source	Rating
AllMusic	4/5 stars
RapReviews	6.5/10

Global Warning is the third studio album by Canadian hip-hop group Rascalz. It was released in 1999 via Vik Recordings. The album debuted at number 20 on the Billboard Canadian Albums chart. At the Juno Awards of 2000, the album was nominated for a Juno Award for Best Rap Recording, but lost to Choclair's Ice Cold.

== Track listing ==
No.	Title	Writer(s)	Producer(s)	Length
1.	"The Global Warning"	Cristian Bahamonde	DJ Kemo	1:03
2.	"High Noon"	Romeo Jacobs; Barry Leonard; C. Bahamonde; Jason Hunter	Misfit	4:21
3.	"Priceless" (featuring Esthero)	Jacobs; Leonard; C. Bahamonde	DJ Kemo	4:33
4.	"Can't Relate" (featuring Juju and Psycho Les)	Jacobs; Leonard; Jerry Tineo; Lester Fernandez	Psycho Les	4:24
5.	"Gametime"	Jacobs; Leonard; C. Bahamonde	DJ Kemo	4:05
6.	"Population Control"	Jacobs; Leonard	Bobby Brass; Jay-Rome	3:22
7.	"Top of the World" (featuring Barrington Levy and K-os)	Jacobs; Leonard; C. Bahamonde; Barrington Levy; Kevin Brereton; Rebekka A. Johnson; Dean Taylor	Red 1; DJ Kemo	4:48
8.	"Gunnfinga" (featuring Kardinal Offishall)	Jacobs; C. Bahamonde; Jason Harrow	DJ Kemo	4:56
9.	"For the Rhyme"		Misfit	0:40
10.	"As It Is" (featuring Choclair)	Jacobs; Leonard; C. Bahamonde; Kareem Blake	Misfit; DJ Kemo	3:42
11.	"Fallen" (featuring K-os)	Jacobs; Brereton; Bernard Sumner; Gillian Gilbert	K-os	4:24
12.	"C-IV"	Jacobs; Leonard; C. Bahamonde; Dennis Coles; Robert Diggs; Lamont Hawkins; Hunter; Corey Woods	DJ Kemo	3:55
13.	"Where You At" (featuring KRS-One)	Jacobs; Leonard; Lawrence Parker	KRS-One	3:40
14.	"Area 51"	Leonard	Misfit	5:40
15.	"On the Run"	Jacobs; Leonard; Alan Maman	The Alchemist	3:50
16.	"Témoin" (featuring Muzion)	Jacobs; Leonard; C. Bahamonde; Stanley Salgado; Jocelyn Bruno; Jennifer Salgado; Ludwine Dejean	DJ Kemo	4:44
17.	"Bordaline" (featuring Concise and Sazon)	Jacobs; Leonard; C. Bahamonde; David Bahamonde; Jonathan Alem	DJ Kemo	4:16
18.	"Lab Rat Produce"	Jacobs; Leonard; C. Bahamonde	DJ Kemo	1:05
19.	"Sharpshooter (Best of the Best)" (featuring Bret "The Hitman" Hart)	Jacobs; Leonard; C. Bahamonde; Bret Hart	DJ Kemo	3:53
20.	"Blessings"	Jacobs; Leonard; C. Bahamonde	Red 1	1:24
Total length:				1:12:45

== Charts ==
Chart (1999)	Peak position
Canadian Albums (Billboard)	20
