= Big Black Lincoln =

Canadian rhythm and blues band

- Origin: Toronto, Ontario, Canada
- Genres: R&B; hip hop
- Past members: Saukrates; T.R.A.C.K.S. Agile; Ro Dolla; Shakari Nyte

Big Black Lincoln was a Canadian R&B musical group from Toronto, Ontario, active in the mid-2000s. Led by rapper Saukrates, the group included musicians T.R.A.C.K.S., Agile, Ro Dolla and Shakari Nyte.

After realizing that some of the songs he was writing weren't fitting in on his rap-oriented albums, Saukrates launched the band as a side project. The group released the single "Pimpin' Life" in 2003, receiving a Juno Award nomination for R&B/Soul Recording of the Year at the Juno Awards of 2004. They followed up with the full-length album Heaven's Caught on Fire in 2006. The album went on to be recognized as an important influence on Toronto's R&B and hip hop scenes in the later 2000s and 2010s.
