= Yes! (k-os album) =

Studio album by k-os
- Released: April 14, 2009
- Genre: Alternative hip hop
- Length: 52:14
- Label: Universal Music Canada
- Producers: k-os, Rich Kidd

K-os chronology
Collected (2007)	Yes! (2009)	The Trill: A Journey so Far (2009)

Professional ratings
Review scores
Source	Rating
AllMusic	3.5/5 stars
Chart Attack	4/5
HipHopDX	3.5/5 stars
NOW	4/5 stars
RapReviews	9/10
Toronto Star	3.5/4 stars

Yes! is the fourth studio album by Canadian hip-hop artist k-os, released in Canada on April 14, 2009 by Universal Music Canada. The first single, "4 3 2 1", was released to radio in December 2008 and peaked at #98 on the Canadian Hot 100, also the video premiered on February 17, 2009. "Burning Bridges" and "I Wish I Knew Natalie Portman" are the second and third singles respectively. The album also debuted at #9 on the Canadian Albums Chart. On November 17, Yes! was released on iTunes in the United States, with a physical release in the US on February 23, 2010, and in the UK on 3 May. The video for "I Wish I Knew Natalie Portman" was released on November 23 as promo for the US physical release in February 2010. The video for "Zambony" was released on July 14, 2010, as promo for the US and UK physical releases as well.

The album was nominated for Rap Recording of the Year at the Juno Awards of 2010. In 2026, the album was certified gold by Music Canada, with sales of over 40,000 units in Canada.

== Background ==
Yes! was recorded at a number of studios, including Vancouver's The Warehouse Studio, Mushroom Studios, and k-os' home studio. A working title for the album was called Souls on Ice, after a line from "Zambony".

Before recording Yes!, k-os relocated from his hometown of Toronto to Vancouver and changed record labels from EMI to Universal Music Group-Nettwerk. k-os has said of the album, "this album to me is taking those passionate feelings I have and transmuting them into something that's fun -- because I'm having so much fun right now."

On the album cover, k-os is shown painting a wall red with a paint roller, while holding an Ensoniq ASR-X Pro sampler in the other hand. Also, a black acoustic guitar is leaning against the wall, and the word "Yes!" is displayed, similar to the original cover on his debut album Exit, which had a green background with an "EXIT" sign at the top left. It is his first album not to have his trademark "tree logo" on its cover.

The album was included on the longlist for the 2009 Polaris Music Prize.

Speaking on "I Wish I Knew Natalie Portman", k-os said, "this song started because I went over to Saukrates' house. He invited me over and he was playing a bunch of music because we were trying to get together on a track. And as the story goes, after playing me five or six tracks he was like, 'oh yeah, and I got this thing'. And I was like, 'God, dude I have to rap on that.' And he's like, 'that?' I was like, 'that's Phantom Planet'. I didn't even know it was an OC thing. And he sliced and diced it on his computer, left his verse on it and left a whole second verse for me to write my verse to. And I had that song for a year, no, six months. I was rolling on tour and then by accident we were playing Whistler, DJing and we were running out of songs and we played that song. The crowd was just like, 'I'm on the run!' and they'd never heard it before. And I was like, 'this is going to be on my next album,' and it was actually the last song that I added to the record. And so his verse is on it, and by default Nelly Furtado is on it. She's the one singing, 'can't really make you love me.'"

About the title; "The title came because I wanted to call it — I couldn't call it "On the Run," because Soxx wanted to use that on his record and I couldn't call it "I Can't Make You Love Me," because there's a Bonnie Raitt song called that and everyone thought it was like blasphemy for me to call it that. So I kept on putting off the title and one morning I was in my bed hungover and my publisher was like 'You've got to tell me a name right now.' I'm like 'I don't know, I wish I knew Natalie Portman.' It was like 'Are you serious right now?' I'm like 'Yeah, I wish I knew Natalie Portman.' And that was it. It wasn't even something I thought about."

== Track listing ==
1. "Zambony" - 3:46
  - Main sample from "Morning Hymn and Alleluia" from the Sound of Music soundtrack
2. "Astronaut" - 3:14
3. "Burning Bridges" - 3:32
4. "Uptown GirL" (featuring Emily Haines & Murray Lightburn) - 3:38
  - Contains a sample of "Love Buzz" by Shocking Blue.
5. "I Wish I Knew Natalie Portman" (featuring Saukrates & Nelly Furtado) (Produced by Rich Kidd) - 3:10
  - Originally a Saukrates and Nelly Furtado collaboration entitled "On the Run", this track is the only track that does not appear on the Yes! It's Yours remix album, due to the fact it was a late addition to the album. On its official video, the track is known as "On the Run"
  - Contains an interpolation of "California" by Phantom Planet.
6. "4 3 2 1" - 3:54
  - Contains a sample of "Soul Flower (Remix)" by The Pharcyde.
7. "Eye Know Something" (featuring Becky Ninkovic) - 3:36
  - Contains a sample of "I Know There's Something Going On" by Frida.
8. "The Aviator" - 3:27
9. "FUN!" - 5:27
  - "Gotham City" (Hidden track)
10. "Mr. Telephone Man" - 6:06
  - "blackjackjohnson" (Hidden track)
11. "WhipC.R.E.A.M." - 2:56
12. "The Avenue" - 9:23
  - "The Backseat" (Hidden track)

=== iTunes bonus tracks ===
The following tracks were available with the iTunes pre-order of the album.

13. "Dance In Your Car"

== Yes! It's Yours ==
Yes! It's Yours is remixed version of Yes! containing tracks mixed by producers from all over the world. The album will be made available through concert venues with donations.

=== Track listing ===
1. "Zambony" (Phil Azer Remix)- 2:22
2. "Astronaut" (Tee L. Remix)- 3:17
3. "Burning Bridges" (TheSoundCrate Remix)- 3:37
4. "Uptown Girl" (Jalyn (Film Composer / Music Producer) Remix)- 3:41
5. "4 3 2 1" (TheSoundCrate Remix)- 3:55
6. "Eye Know Something" (Herr Kaschke Remix)- 3:15
7. "The Aviator" (Len Afrosaxon Remix)- 8:42
8. "FUN!" (Ric Notes Remix)- 3:00
9. "Mr. Telephone Man" (Len Afrosaxon Remix)- 6:18
10. "WhipC.R.E.A.M." (Remot Remix)- 2:44
11. "The Avenue" (Zach W. Remix)- 4:44

== Charts ==
Yes!

Chart (2009)	Peak position
Canadian Albums Chart	9

Yes! It Yours

Chart (2009)	Peak position
Canadian Albums Chart	23
