= Crabbuckit =

Single by k-os

from the album Joyful Rebellion
- Released: 2004
- Genre: Hip hop
- Length: 3:48
- Label: Astralwerks
- Songwriter: k-os

K-os singles chronology
"B-Boy Stance" (2004)	"Crabbuckit" (2004)	"The Love Song" (2004)

Music video
- "Crabbuckit" on YouTube

"Crabbuckit" is a single by Canadian hip hop musician k-os, released in 2004 as the first single from his album Joyful Rebellion, and is the fourth track on the album. The song's music video reached number one on the MuchMusic Countdown in 2004, and won Best Pop Video at the 2005 MuchMusic Video Awards. The song won the Single of the Year at the Juno Awards of 2005, and was the first hip-hop song ever to win the Juno in that category. In 2022, the song was certified platinum by Music Canada.

The title and work refers to the crab in the bucket syndrome where a group of crabs will pull down any crab that tries to escape, thereby ensuring their collective demise.

== Music video ==
k-os walks down streets in Toronto, wearing sunglasses that allow him to see individual people who are crabs in disguise and he performs in a club. Both Nelly Furtado and Red1 make a brief cameo appearance in the music video. Nelly Furtado can be seen playing guitar in front of a house block and Red1 can be seen in the bar sitting beside k-os.

== Reception ==
The song was ranked the 37th-greatest Canadian song of all time in the 2005 CBC Radio series 50 Tracks: The Canadian Version. In 2021, Exclaim! included the song in their list of "The 27 Best Songs About Toronto". In 2022, Complex ranked the song #5 in their list of "The 20 Best Canadian Rap Songs of All Time". In 2023, CBC named the song as one of "20 Songs That Tell the Story of Canadian Hip-Hop".

== Charts ==
Chart (2004)	Peak position
Germany (GfK)	90
Canada (Nielsen BDS)	11
Canada CHR/Pop Top 30 (Radio & Records)	3
Canada Hot AC Top 30 (Radio & Records)	5

== Certifications ==
Region	Certification	Certified units/sales
Canada (Music Canada)	Platinum	80,000^{‡}
^{‡} Sales+streaming figures based on certification alone.

== Covers ==
The song was covered by Canadian folk/country trio The Good Lovelies on their 2011 album Let the Rain Fall.
