= Joyful Rebellion =

Studio album by k-os
- Released: August 13, 2004 (Canada); September 21, 2006 (US)
- Studios: Various: Umbrella Sound (Toronto); The Warehouse Studio (Vancouver); Reaction Studios (Toronto); 306 Studios (Toronto); Hipposonic Studios (Vancouver); Metalworks Studios (Mississauga); Blacksmith Studios (Toronto)
- Genres: Hip hop; alternative hip hop
- Length: 58:05 (original); 73:58 (reissue)
- Labels: EMI (Canada); Virgin Records (US)
- Producers: k-os; Greg O'Shea; Kenny Neal Jr.

K-os chronology
Exit (2002)	Joyful Rebellion (2004)	Atlantis: Hymns for Disco (2006)

Singles from Joyful Rebellion
- 1. "B-Boy Stance" Released: 2004; 2. "Crabbuckit" Released: 2004; 3. "The Love Song" Released: 2004; 4. "Man I Used to Be" Released: 2005

Joyful Rebellion is the second studio album by Canadian hip-hop artist k-os. It was released on August 13, 2004 in Canada by EMI and September 21, 2004 in the United States by Virgin Records. It debuted at number 7 on the Canadian Albums Chart, and was certified platinum by the CRIA, selling over 100,000 units in Canada. In 2024, the album was reissued as Joyful Rebel Lion+ with four bonus tracks for its twentieth anniversary.

The song "B-Boy Stance" won Hip Hop Recording of the Year, and Music Video of the Year at the 2004 Canadian Urban Music Awards. The album won Rap Recording of the Year at the 2005 Juno Awards, as well as Single of the Year for "Crabbuckit", and Video of the Year for "B-Boy Stance". At the 2005 MuchMusic Video Awards, "Crabbuckit" won Best Pop Video, and "Man I Used to Be" won Best Rap Video. At the 2017 Polaris Music Prize, the album won the jury vote for the Heritage Prize in the 1996-2005 category.

== Critical reception ==
Professional ratings
Aggregate scores
Source	Rating
Metacritic	75/100
Review scores
Source	Rating
AllMusic	4/5 stars
HipHopDX	4.5/5 stars
Obnoxious Listeners	4.5/5 stars
Pitchfork	7.4/10
RapReviews	8.5/10
Rolling Stone	3/5 stars
Sputnikmusic	4.5/5 stars

Joyful Rebellion received mostly positive reviews from critics. On Metacritic, the album holds a score of 75/100 based on 9 reviews, indicating "generally favorable reviews".

=== Accolades ===
Publication	List	Rank	Ref.
Bob Mersereau	The Top 100 Canadian Albums	68	
Chart Attack	Top 50 Canadian Albums of All Time (2005)	11	
Exclaim!	Top 10 Hip-Hop Albums of 2004	5	
RapReviews	Top 10 Records of 2004	7	

== Overview ==
Like Exit, Joyful Rebellion primarily focuses on k-os's negative views of the music industry, supplemented by more metaphorical lyrics.

The track "Man I Used to Be" is about a man who wants to revert to his previous self. The tracks "The Love Song" and "The Mirror" are semi-autobiographical. The song "One Blood" is an anti-war message. The song "Papercutz" is k-os's denial that Exit was his last album. "Commandante" features the opening sample of a woman speaking in Spanish on a voice mail.

== Track listing ==
No.	Title	Length
1.	"EMCEE Murdah"	3:30
2.	"Crucial"	3:25
3.	"Man I Used to Be"	5:04
4.	"Crabbuckit"	3:48
5.	"B-Boy Stance"	4:00
6.	"Commandante"	3:45
7.	"The Love Song"	4:18
8.	"Hallelujah"	4:17
9.	"Clap Ur Handz"	1:20
10.	"Neutroniks"	3:51
11.	"Dirty Water" (featuring Sam Roberts)	4:14
12.	"One Blood (Jiggy Homicide)"	3:29
13.	"Papercutz" (featuring Ian Kamau)	8:12
14.	"The Mirror"	4:52
Total length:		58:05

Joyful Rebel Lion+
No.	Title	Length
15.	"Same Oley!"	3:13
16.	"The Bed’s Too Big Without You"	4:19
17.	"Neutroniks (Accapella)"	3:48
18.	"Funky Country (Drive With Her To The Yukon)"	4:33
Total length:		73:58

Notes

- In the original release, "The Mirror" is a hidden track following "Papercutz" and 2:23 of silence
- "Neutroniks" is only featured on the Canadian version of the album

== Charts ==
Chart (2004)	Peak position
Canadian Albums Chart	7
