= The Love Song (k-os song) =

Single by k-os

from the album Joyful Rebellion
- Released: 2004
- Genre: Hip hop
- Length: 4:18
- Label: EMI, Virgin Records
- Songwriter: k-os

K-os singles chronology
"Crabbuckit" (2004)	"The Love Song" (2004)	"Man I Used to Be" (2005)

Music video
- "The Love Song" on YouTube

"The Love Song" is a single by k-os from the album Joyful Rebellion. The string arrangements were done by Laura May Elston. The song gained some popularity in New Zealand, Greece and Portugal after being featured on a Vodafone television advertisement.

== Music video ==
k-os walks across a desert and freestyle battles against an opponent. k-os walks to a monastery with breakdancing being studied and into a room with youngsters sitting on the floor watching a film educating them about the roots and beginnings of Hip Hop culture. The video ends with k-os walking off into the sunset with To Be Continued.

Desert scenes were filmed at Sandbanks Provincial Park on Lake Ontario.

== Charts ==
Chart (2006)	Peak position
New Zealand (Recorded Music NZ)	40
