= Sunday Morning (k-os song) =

Single by k-os

from the album Atlantis: Hymns for Disco
- Released: September 2006
- Recorded: 2006
- Genre: Alternative hip hop
- Length: 3:47
- Label: EMI, Virgin Records
- Songwriter: k-os

K-os singles chronology
"ELEctrik HeaT – the seekwiLL" (2006)	"Sunday Morning" (2006)

"Sunday Morning" is a song by Canadian hip hop musician k-os. It was released in September 2006 as the second single from his 2006 album Atlantis: Hymns for Disco. The song peaked at number 19 on the Canadian Singles Chart making it k-os's 2nd highest charting song. The song reached #5 on MuchMusic Countdown. In 2007, the song was performed on The Late Show, and at Vans Warped Tour. The song received nominations for Single of the Year and Songwriter of the Year at the Juno Awards of 2007.

== Music video ==
The music video consists of three parts. Part one shows k-os outside talking with a friend before a show. Suddenly a child comes by saying that the drummer for the performance is sick and cannot make it. K-os quickly finds a skilled drummer, Sebastien Grainger, close by playing on buckets in the street. When two girls try to go in with the drummer, he tells them to wait there.

The women quickly think that he is being cruel, and a thought bubble appears above both of them with a broken heart often used as comedy. Later in part two, K-os sings at a school dance in a 1980s or 1990s theme with photos taken. Part three is k-os walking in a beautiful grassy hillside with an acoustic guitar.

== Charts and certifications ==
=== Chart positions ===
Chart (2006)	Peak position
Canada (Canadian Singles Chart)	19
Canada CHR/Top 40 (Billboard)	9
Canada Hot AC (Billboard)	12
Canada Rock (Billboard)	33

=== Certifications ===
Region	Certification	Certified units/sales
Canada (Music Canada)	Gold	40,000^{‡}
^{‡} Sales+streaming figures based on certification alone.
