= Saukrates =

Canadian rapper and singer (born 1978)

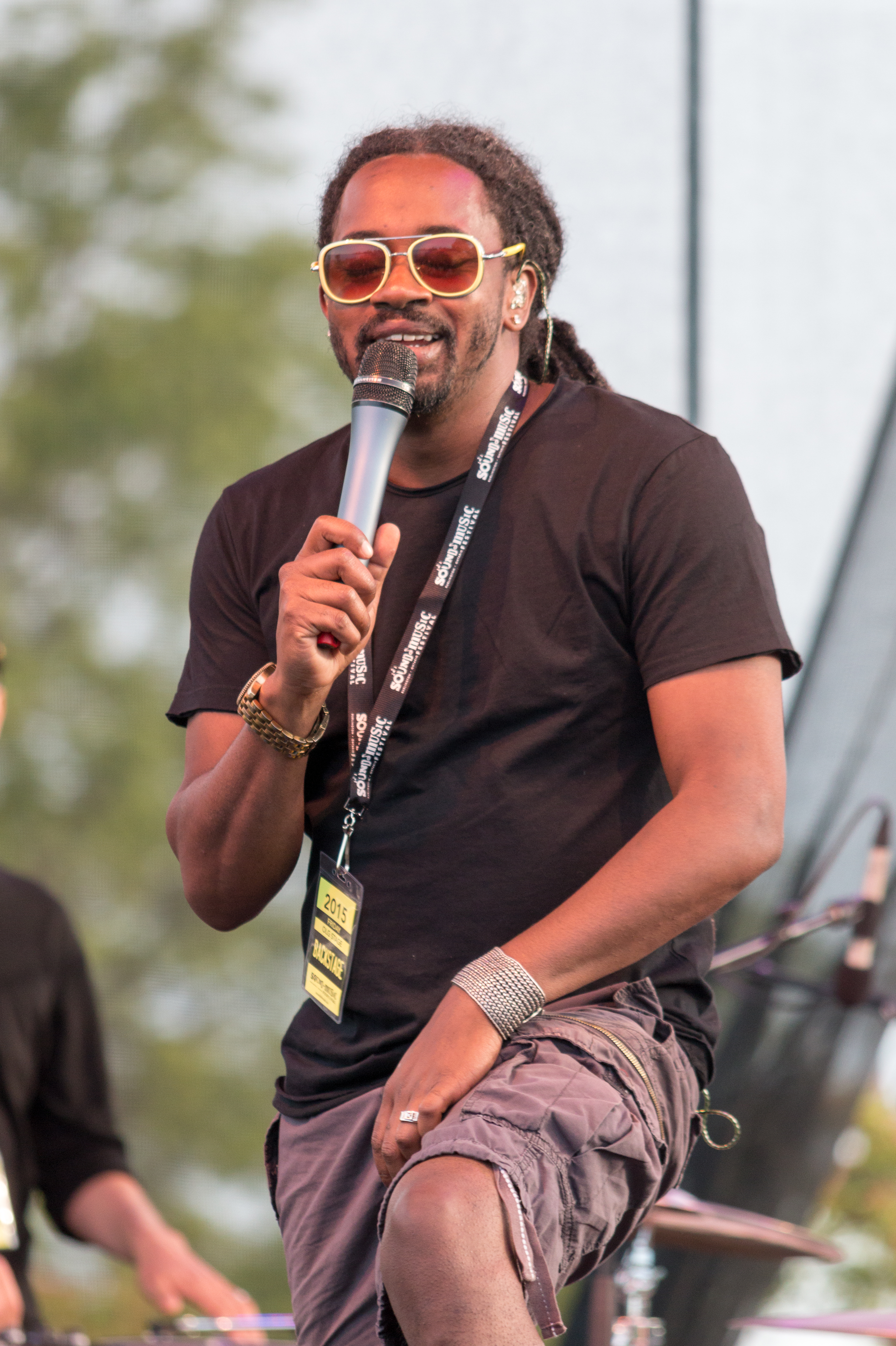
- Saukrates performing at the 2015 Burlington's Sound of Music Festival

Background information
- Also known as: Bigg Soxx
- Born: Karl Amani Wailoo; March 6, 1978 (age 48); Ottawa, Ontario, Canada
- Origin: Toronto, Ontario, Canada
- Genres: Canadian hip hop; R&B
- Occupations: Rapper; singer; songwriter; record producer
- Years active: 1994–present
- Labels: FrostByte; eOne; Capitol Hill; Culvert Music
- Member of: Gilla House
- Formerly of: Big Black Lincoln
- Website: BiggSoxx.com

Karl Amani Wailoo (born March 6, 1978), better known by his stage name Saukrates (/ˈsɒkrətiːz/; "Socrates"), is a Canadian rapper, singer, and record producer. He is the co-founder of Capitol Hill Music, and lead singer of the R&B group Big Black Lincoln. He is also a member of Redman's Gilla House collective.

== Career ==
=== Early career ===
In 1994, his first track was titled "Still Caught Up", which earned a nomination for Best Rap Recording at the 1996 Juno Awards. He was also nominated for another Juno of the same award in 2000 for "Money or Love". In 2001, Saukrates produced the track "Uh-Huh" for Redman's Malpractice album, and appeared on a track called "Enjoy Da Ride". He also did a track called "Fine Line" for the soundtrack to Method Man and Redman's How High movie. In 2002, Saukrates teamed up with fellow Canadian producer Agile from BrassMunk to produce the track "Heaven", for Nas' album God's Son, which featured Jully Black.

Canadian hip hop artists have had a hard time getting established south of the border, and Saukrates is no exception. In 1996, he was signed to Warner Bros. Records. Unfortunately for Saukrates, Warner dropped him in 1998, which was one year before his debut album The Underground Tapes was released on Capitol Hill. By 2000, Saukrates reached another big deal with Def Jam and Gilla House Records (owned by Redman). Eventually, Saukrates was dropped by Def Jam because he was no longer considered a priority, however he remained with Gilla House. He appears on two tracks of Redman's latest album Red Gone Wild, released in March 2007.

After completing a second album, Bad Addiction, in 2004, Saukrates faced difficulty securing widespread release on a major label. In the meantime, he produced material for Big Black Lincoln and R&B singer Andreena Mill.

=== Work with Nelly Furtado ===
On November 19, 2006, he performed "Promiscuous" with Nelly Furtado at halftime show of the 94th Grey Cup (the CFL championship game) in Winnipeg, Manitoba. Two days later, Saukrates beat-boxed during her performance of "Say It Right" at the 2006 American Music Awards in Los Angeles. On February 23, 2007, he appeared on the ABC Daytime soap opera One Life to Live with Furtado, performing "Promiscuous".

Saukrates also toured with Furtado on her Get Loose Tour, as a percussionist, backing vocalist and supporting act.

=== 2009–present: Season One ===
In 2009, Saukrates collaborated with Method Man & Redman on the single "A-Yo", from their album Blackout! 2. That year, he also collaborated with k-os and Nelly Furtado on the single "I Wish I Knew Natalie Portman", from k-os' album Yes!. Originally, the track was a collaboration between Saukrates and Nelly Furtado entitled "On the Run".

Saukrates released his much delayed second studio album, Season One, on April 24, 2012. The album features appearances by Redman, k-os, and Nickelus F among others. The first single, "Drop It Down" featuring Redman, was released on iTunes on July 26, 2011. The second single "Say I" was released in October 2011, and re-released in January 2012, featuring a new verse by OB O'Brien.

In 2012, Saukrates collaborated with Classified and Skratch Bastid on the song "Anything Goes" from Classified's self-titled album. The album was released on January 22, 2013. He was also featured twice on Orchestrated Noise, the newly released 7th studio album by pioneering Canadian MC Maestro Fresh Wes on the tracks "Stranger" and "Look for Me in the Whirlwind", the latter of which also features fellow Canadian hip-hop artist King Reign.

== Discography ==
Studio albums

- The Underground Tapes (1999)
- Heaven's Caught on Fire (with Big Black Lincoln) (2006)
- Season One (2012)
- Season 2 (2017)
- Bad Addiction (2024)
- Father Time (2026) [Unreleased album from mid-1990's]

EPs

- Brick House (1997)
- The Bigg Soxx Versions EP (2010)
- Amani (2014)

== Commercials ==
Since 2008, Saukrates has done narration for Toronto Blue Jays commercials and documentaries. In 2011, he made the song "Say I" for a Nike commercial, featuring NHL player P. K. Subban. In the 2018/19 NBA season, he narrated both the Season Opener preview for the Toronto Raptors season on Sportsnet, as well as its sequel for the beginning of the 2019 NBA Finals.

== See also ==
- Canadian hip hop
- Music of Canada
