= Exit (k-os album) =

Studio album by k-os
- Released: March 26, 2002 (Canada); January 28, 2003 (US)
- Recorded: 1998–2001
- Genres: Hip hop, alternative hip hop
- Length: 57:06
- Label: Astralwerks

K-os chronology
Exit (2002)	Joyful Rebellion (2004)

Singles from Exit
- 1. "Heaven Only Knows" Released: 2002; 2. "Superstarr Pt. Zero" Released: 2002

Professional ratings
Review scores
Source	Rating
AllMusic	4/5 stars
HipHopDX	4/5 stars
RapReviews	(8/10)
Sputnikmusic	3.5/5 stars

Exit is the debut studio album by Canadian hip-hop artist k-os, released March 26, 2002 in Canada and January 28, 2003 in the United States by Astralwerks.

The album is an eclectic mix of musical styles, incorporating everything from standard hip-hop beats to reggae, soul and flamenco. Exit was among the top 45 best-selling rap albums in Canada in 2002 and the fifth best-selling rap album of the year in Canada by a Canadian rap artist. The album was nominated for Rap Recording of the Year at the Juno Awards of 2003.

== Overview ==
The track "Entrance" starts off Exit with a comment on the diversity of the album from John Salley. He asks k-os, "With all this different stuff on this one album, what is it?" Then, as the track number changes on the LCD, k-os begins his answer. "Fantastique" itself is more of an introduction piece than "Entrance" is. The second track introduces k-os and characterizes him. In this song, he puts forth his mission statement. He raps that he was happy with his metaphorical girl named Wise, and that he was content with his own wisdom until the "phone rang," which he decided to ignore. Upon the next ringing, however, he picked up the phone and heard the man on the other end calling him to arms, because "hip-hop is dying." Though at this point he has characterized himself as something of a rap savior, the chorus depicts him as a humble person. The major talking point of verse two is the first mention of his aversion to pimps and those who objectify other humans, rapping, "pimps just react to things, men make 'em happen."

After "Fantastique" has come to a close with its spasmodic guitar loop, "EXIT (Call Me)" begins with the listener's first taste of k-os's singing skills. This ode to escapism, similar to "Hallelujah" from his next album, Joyful Rebellion, combines a beautiful melody, matching k-os's vocals quite well, with a lyric full of hopelessness at the helplessness of the world around him. This song has the first reference to his apparent amusement at the metamorphosis of glass to sand, which will appear later in "Superstarr Pt. 2."

== Track listing ==
No.	Title	Length
1.	"Entrance" (spoken by John "Spider" Salley)	0:19
2.	"Fantastique"	2:52
3.	"EXIT (Call Me)"	3:58
4.	"Heaven Only Knows"	3:55
5.	"Superstarr Pt. 1 (Yoshua's Song)"	3:41
6.	"Freeze"	3:54
7.	"The Anthem"	4:22
8.	"Patience"	3:48
9.	"Higher"	3:42
10.	"Masquerade" (featuring Kamau)	5:37
11.	"Follow Me" (featuring Red1)	4:00
12.	"Superstarr Pt. 2 (Babylon Girl)"	3:26
13.	"Neutroniks"	3:52
14.	"Superstarr Pt. Zero"	4:51
15.	"Heaven Only Knows (Remix)" (remixed by DJ Kemo)	4:49
Total length:		57:06

Notes

- "Neutroniks" and "Superstarr Pt. Zero" are not available on the Canadian version of the album. However, "Neutroniks" does appear on the Canadian version of his next album Joyful Rebellion.
- The CD version of the album adds 61 seconds of silence at the end of "Superstarr, Pt. 2", bringing the track's length to 4:05.

== Charts ==
Year-end chart performance for Exit by k-os
Chart (2002)	Position
Canadian R&B Albums (Nielsen SoundScan)	85
Canadian Rap Albums (Nielsen SoundScan)	45
