= Man I Used to Be =

2005 single by k-os

Single by k-os

from the album Joyful Rebellion
- Released: January 2005
- Length: 3:47
- Label: EMI Canada
- Songwriter: Kevin Brereton
- Producer: k-os

K-os singles chronology
"The Love Song" (2004)	"Man I Used to Be" (2005)	"Crucial" (2005)

Music video
- "Man I Used to Be" on YouTube

"Man I Used to Be" is a song by Canadian alternative rapper k-os. It was released in January 2005 as a single from his 2004 album Joyful Rebellion. The song's music video won Best Rap Video, Best Cinematography and Best Direction at the 2005 MuchMusic Video Awards. The song was nominated for Single of the Year at the Juno Awards of 2006. In 2022, the song was certified gold by Music Canada.

== Music video ==
The video, directed by Micah Meisner, begins with break dancers in the hallway of an apartment building and k-os is in his room packing to leave, taking a box of seemingly great importance. k-os hails a taxi outside of the Hotel Waverly and two men fight a duel by dancing on the sidewalk. A bag man, pushing a cart with a neon light, sings the lyrics, and k-os riding in the taxi, disappears by opening his box, which teleports him to the cockpit of a spacecraft in space. Footage of Maasai is seen on k-os's screen and the spacecraft enters warp drive.

== Personnel ==
Personnel are taken from the Joyful Rebellion album booklet.

- k-os – keyboards, drum programming
- Nelson Milley – electric guitars
- Dave Williams – keyboards, piano
- Colin Robinson – congas
- Karen Graves – violin
- Jeewon Kim – violin
- Kathleen Kajioka – viola
- Michael Olsen – cello

== Charts ==
Chart (2005)	Peak position
Canada CHR/Pop Top 30 (Radio & Records)	4
Canada Hot AC Top 30 (Radio & Records)	12

Chart (2014)	Peak position
France (SNEP)	52

== Certifications ==
Region	Certification	Certified units/sales
Canada (Music Canada)	Gold	40,000^{‡}
^{‡} Sales+streaming figures based on certification alone.
