= Atlantis: Hymns for Disco =

Studio album by k-os
- Released: October 10, 2006
- Recorded: 2006
- Studios: Various: The Orange Lounge (Toronto); The Black House (Toronto); Umbrella Sound (Toronto); The Warehouse Studio (Vancouver); Sonic Temple (Halifax); Quad Studios (New York); Hipposonic Studios (Vancouver); Armoury Studios (Vancouver)
- Genres: Rap; alternative hip hop; indie rock
- Length: 55:33 (original); 63:11 (reissue)
- Labels: EMI (Canada); Virgin Records (US)

K-os chronology
| Joyful Rebellion (2004) | Atlantis: Hymns for Disco (2006) | Collected (2007) |

Singles from Joyful Rebellion
- 1. "ELEctrik HeaT – the seekwiLL" Released: 2006; 2. "Sunday Morning" Released: 2006

Atlantis: Hymns for Disco is the third studio album by Canadian hip-hop artist k-os. It was released in Canada on October 10, 2006, and debuted at number 2 in music sales. The album was released worldwide on February 20, 2007. In the US, it reached number 152 on the Billboard 200 and number 5 on the Heatseekers. The album was certified platinum by the CRIA, with sales of over 100,000 units in Canada. The album was nominated for Pop Album of the Year at the Juno Awards of 2007. In 2024, the album was reissued as Atlantis+ with four bonus tracks.

== Critical reception ==
Professional ratings
Aggregate scores
| Source | Rating |
|---|---|
| Metacritic | 70/100 |
Review scores
| Source | Rating |
| AllMusic | 3.5/5 stars |
| The Guardian | 3/5 stars |
| HipHopDX | 4/5 stars |
| Pitchfork | 6.5/10 |
| PopMatters | 7/10 |
| RapReviews | 8.5/10 |
| Rolling Stone | 3/5 stars |
| Slant Magazine | 3.5/5 stars |
| Soundsect | 4/5 stars |
| Sputnikmusic | 3.5/5 stars |

Atlantis: Hymns for Disco received mixed to positive reviews from critics. On Metacritic, the album holds a score of 70/100 based on 17 reviews, indicating "generally favorable reviews".

== Track listing ==
| No. | Title | Length |
|---|---|---|
| 1. | "ELEctrik HeaT - the seekwiLL" | 3:38 |
| 2. | "The Rain" | 3:51 |
| 3. | "FlyPaper" | 4:10 |
| 4. | "Equalizer" | 3:08 |
| 5. | "Sunday Morning" | 3:47 |
| 6. | "Mirror in the Sky" | 3:21 |
| 7. | "Born to Run" | 4:48 |
| 8. | "Valhalla" (featuring Sam Roberts and Kevin Drew) | 4:16 |
| 9. | "CatDieseL" | 3:44 |
| 10. | "black Ice - Hymn for Disco" | 5:05 |
| 11. | "AquaCityBoy" | 2:41 |
| 12. | "Highway 7" | 4:07 |
| 13. | "Ballad of NoaH" (featuring Ian Kamau and Buck 65) | 4:24 |
| 14. | "Funky Country (Drive With Her To The Yukon)" | 4:33 |
| Total length: | | 55:33 |

Atlantis+
| No. | Title | Length |
|---|---|---|
| 14. | "Chocolate Chewing Gum" | 3:30 |
| 15. | "I FeLL 4 Her!" | 1:44 |
| 16. | "Sunday Morning (Block Party Mix)" | 3:55 |
| 17. | "Invulnerable" | 3:02 |
| Total length: | | 63:11 |

Notes

- "black Ice - Hymn for Disco" contains the hidden track "Chocolate Chewing Gum (Excerpt)"
- "Ballad of NoaH" contains the hidden track "Chocolate Chewing Gum" on CD releases
- "Funky Country (Drive With Her To The Yukon)" is not included on Atlantis+

== Charts ==
| Chart (2007) | Peak position |
|---|---|
| Canadian Albums Chart | 5 |
| U.S. Billboard 200 | 152 |
| U.S. Billboard Top Heatseekers | 5 |
