= Rascalz =

Canadian hip-hop group

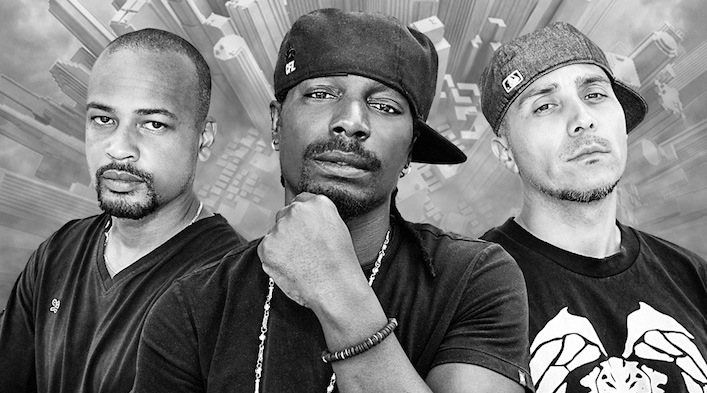

Background information
- Origin: Vancouver, British Columbia, Canada
- Genres: Canadian hip hop, alternative hip hop, experimental hip hop
- Years active: 1989–present
- Label: Figure IV/ViK./BMG Canada
- Members: Red1; Misfit; DJ Kemo
- Past members: Zebroc; Dedos
- Website: Official website

Rascalz are a Canadian hip-hop group from Vancouver, British Columbia. The group played a crucial role in the artistic and commercial development of Canadian hip hop as well as specifically for the west coast scene in Vancouver popularizing the term "Van City". The group consists of emcees Red1 and Misfit, and record producer DJ Kemo. Breakdancers Zebroc and Dedos were also part of the group.

== History ==
Formed in 1991, the group released an independent album for Calabash Records in 1992. The album, Really Livin', was recorded under the name of Ragga Muffin Rascals, and a reworked major label recording was released the following year in 1993 by Sony Music Canada. Both versions of the album received Juno Award nominations for Best Rap Recording, the Calabash Records version at the Juno Awards of 1993 and the Sony version at the Juno Awards of 1995. In 1994, the group started Figure IV Records. The Rascalz are not Vancouver's first rap group, and have quoted acts such as EQ, Craig Crush, and Mike D'Zire as influences.

In 1995 they were featured on an episode of RapCity, which showcased Vancouver hip-hop. The group moved to BMG Canada in 1997 to record Cash Crop.

=== Juno Award protest ===
Cash Crop was nominated for Best Rap Recording at the Juno Awards of 1998. Due to Canadian hip hop's limited commercial visibility in the era, however, the rap award had never been presented during the main Juno ceremony, instead being relegated to the untelevised technical awards ceremony during the previous evening. This fact had previously been criticized for creating a barrier to the commercial visibility of Canadian hip hop.

The band won the award, but alleged that racism was a factor in the award's disadvantageous scheduling and explicitly declined the award on that basis. The band had not yet arrived at the ceremony when the award was announced—when they did arrive, they were simply pulled aside and told that they had won the award.

In view of the lack of real inclusion of black music in this ceremony, this feels like a token gesture towards honoring the real impact of urban music in Canada. Urban music, reggae, R&B, and rap, that's all black music, and it's not represented [at the Junos]. We decided that until it is, we were going to take a stance.

Their move sparked considerable media debate about the state of Canadian hip hop. As a result of the controversy, the Juno Awards moved the rap category to the main ceremony the following year.

=== "Northern Touch" ===
Also in 1998, Rascalz wrote a special one-off single called "Northern Touch", which they recorded with guest rappers Checkmate, Kardinal Offishall, Thrust, and Choclair. The music video was directed by Little X and featured Melyssa Ford. Although not on the original pressing of Cash Crop, the song was released as a single, and was quickly adopted as an anthem for Canadian hip hop's resilience and determination. The song broke the odds to become the first Canadian hip hop hit since 1991.

At the Juno Awards of 1999, the first time the rap award was presented during the televised ceremony, Rascalz won the award for "Northern Touch", and performed the song live at the ceremony in Hamilton. This represented the first time that a hip hop band had ever performed on the Juno Awards stage.

=== Later releases ===
Rascalz released Global Warning in 1999. The album contained the hit single "Priceless" (a collaboration with Esthero).

In 2001, the group performed in Charlottetown, Prince Edward Island, with Kardinal Offishall, IRS, and Jelleestone.

The hit song "Crazy World" (featuring Notch and Sazon Diamante) appeared on 2002's album Reloaded. They also recorded a song called "Top of the World" from the Global Warning album, and it featured K-os and Barrington Levy.

Red1 released a solo album, Beg For Nothing on March 6, 2007, through his own Killawatt Records.

The original release of Really Livin' was pressed for first time on limited release vinyl in 2019 on Smoke In Records.

The Rascalz have officially retired from producing new music for over a decade, however still perform occasionally.

In 2021, the Rascalz were credited with their first guest appearance for a Canadian artist in over a decade on the track "Note To The City" by Boslen. The song appeared on his album Dusk to Dawn and was released by Chaos Club Digital/ Capitol Music Group. The actual segment is a sample of Red1's verse on "Blind Wid Da Science" off their 1997 Cash Crop album.

== Discography ==
=== Independent albums ===
- Really Livin' (1992)

=== Studio albums ===
- Really Livin' (1993) (reworked major label re-release)
- Cash Crop (1997)
- Global Warning (1999)
- Reloaded (2002)

=== Solo projects ===
- Red1 – Beg for Nothing (2007)

== See also ==
- Canadian hip hop
- Music of Canada
