= Sean Paul discography =

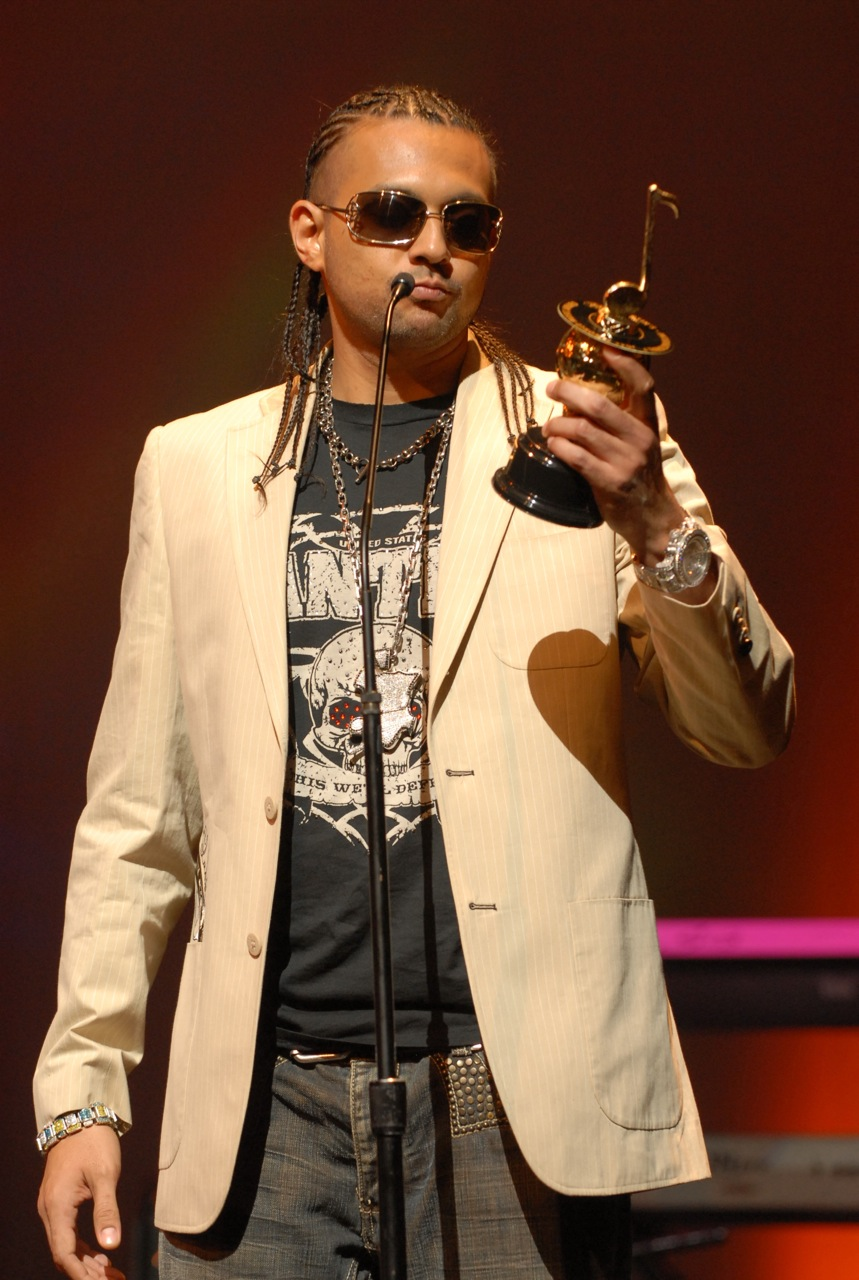
- Sean Paul at the 2007 International Reggae & World Music Awards.
- Studio albums: 8
- Extended plays: 1
- Mixtapes: 1
- Live albums: 1
- Compilation albums: 2
- Singles: 115
- Music videos: 49

This is a comprehensive listing of official releases by Jamaican dancehall musician Sean Paul.

Stage One is the debut album by Paul, released on 28 March 2000. It sold over 500,000 copies. Dutty Rock, Paul's second album, was released on 12 November 2002 and was his commercial breakthrough, featuring two US number-one singles, "Get Busy" and Beyoncé's "Baby Boy", which Sean Paul features on. It also features the singles "Gimme the Light", "Like Glue" and "I'm Still in Love with You", which all charted in the top 10 of the UK Singles Chart. The album itself reached number 2 on the UK Albums Chart, and number 9 on the US Billboard 200 albums chart.

The Trinity is Paul's third album and was released in United States by Atlantic Records on 27 September 2005. The album was preceded by the single "We Be Burnin'", which was released to radio on 22 August 2005. The music video for the single was directed by Jessy Terrero. It was featured on the Black Entertainment Television series Access Granted on 17 August 2005 and premiered online on 18 August 2005 at MTV.com. The single itself peaked at number two on the UK Singles Chart. It also peaked at number six on the US Billboard Hot 100, and seventeen on Billboard's R&B/Hip-Hop chart.

Paul's fourth album, Imperial Blaze, was released on 18 August 2009. The album was certified gold in France, debuting at number 8 in that country, number 5 in Canada, number 4 in Switzerland, and number 17 in Germany. It was also the first ever Jamaican album to debut atop the Billboard Rap Albums chart. The wholly Jamaican-produced project debuted atop the Billboard Reggae chart, and at number 3 on the R&B/Hip Hop Albums chart and number 12 on the Billboard 200.

Paul's fifth album, Tomahawk Technique, was released through Atlantic Records (Warner Music Group) on 18 September 2012. His sixth album, Full Frequency, was released on 18 February 2014.

Paul's EP, Mad Love the Prequel, was released on 29 June 2018, preceded by his contributions to US number-one hit "Cheap Thrills" (Sia featuring Sean Paul), international hit single "Rockabye" (Clean Bandit featuring Anne-Marie and Sean Paul), as well as his own top ten UK hit "No Lie" (featuring Dua Lipa), the EP's lead single.

== Albums ==
=== Studio albums ===
List of studio albums, with selected chart positions and certifications
| Title | Album details | Peak chart positions | | | | | | | | | | Certifications |
| Title | Album details | AUS | AUT | CAN | FRA | GER | NLD | SWI | UK | US | US Reggae | Certifications |
|---|---|---|---|---|---|---|---|---|---|---|---|---|
| Stage One | Released: 28 March 2000; Label: VP, Universal; Format: Cassette, CD, digital download, LP | — | — | — | — | — | — | — | — | — | 2 | |
| Dutty Rock | Released: 12 November 2002; Label: VP, Atlantic; Format: Cassette, CD, digital download, LP | 22 | 5 | 1 | 20 | 10 | 7 | 11 | 2 | 9 | 1 | ARIA: Gold; BPI: 3× Platinum; BVMI: Platinum; IFPI AUT: Gold; IFPI SWI: Platinum; MC: 3× Platinum; NVPI: Gold; RIAA: 3× Platinum; SNEP: 2× Gold |
| The Trinity | Released: 27 September 2005; Label: VP, Atlantic; Format: Cassette, CD, digital download, LP | 100 | 6 | 4 | 5 | 9 | 13 | 4 | 11 | 5 | 1 | BPI: Platinum; BVMI: Gold; IFPI SWI: Gold; MC: Platinum; RIAA: 2× Platinum; SNEP: 2× Platinum |
| Imperial Blaze | Released: 18 August 2009; Label: VP, Atlantic; Format: CD, digital download | — | 17 | 5 | 8 | 17 | 36 | 4 | 38 | 12 | 1 | |
| Tomahawk Technique | Released: 18 September 2012; Label: VP, Atlantic; Format: CD, digital download | — | 7 | — | 5 | 6 | 39 | 3 | 30 | — | 2 | BVMI: Gold; IFPI SWI: Gold; SNEP: Gold |
| Full Frequency | Released: 18 February 2014; Label: VP, Atlantic; Format: CD, digital download | — | 36 | — | 63 | 22 | — | 7 | — | — | 1 | |
| Live n Livin | Released: 12 March 2021; Label: Dutty Rock; Format: Digital download, streaming | — | — | — | — | — | — | — | — | — | 9 | |
| Scorcha | Released: 27 May 2022; Label: Island; Format: Digital download, streaming | — | — | — | — | — | — | — | — (Note: Scorcha did not enter the UK Albums Chart, but peaked at number 80 on the Scottish Albums Chart.) | — | 6 | |
"—" denotes a recording that did not chart or was not released in that territory.

=== Live albums ===
| Title | Album details |
|---|---|
| Sessions@AOL | Released: 14 March 2006; Label: Atlantic; Format: Digital download |

=== Compilation albums ===
| Title | Album details | Peak chart positions | Certifications |
| Title | Album details | CAN | Certifications |
|---|---|---|---|
| Dutty Classics Collection | Released: 2 June 2017; Label: Rhino Entertainment; Format: Digital download, CD | 80 | BPI: Gold |
| Penthouse Flashback Series (with Spragga Benz and Johnny P) | Released: 6 July 2020; Label: Penthouse; Format: Digital download, CD | — | |

== Mixtapes ==
| Title | Album details |
|---|---|
| The Odyssey Mixtape | Released: 26 December 2009; Label: Self-released; Format: Cassette, digital download |

== Extended plays ==
| Title | EP details | Peak chart positions | | | Certifications |
| Title | EP details | CAN | FRA | US Reggae | Certifications |
|---|---|---|---|---|---|
| Mad Love the Prequel | Released: 29 June 2018; Label: Island, SPJ; Format: CD, digital download | 79 | 135 | 4 | ZPAV: Platinum |

== Singles ==
=== As lead artist ===
List of singles as a lead artist, with selected chart positions and certifications, showing year released and album name
| Title | Year | Peak chart positions | | | | | | | | | | Certifications | Album |
| Title | Year | AUS | AUT | BEL (WA) | CAN | FRA | GER | NLD | SWI | UK | US | Certifications | Album |
|---|---|---|---|---|---|---|---|---|---|---|---|---|---|
| "Deport Them" | 2000 | — | — | — | — | — | — | — | — | — | — | | Stage One |
| "Haffi Get De Gal Ya (Hot Gal Today)" (featuring Mr. Vegas) | 2000 | — | — | — | — | — | — | — | — | — | — | | Stage One |
| "Gimme the Light" | 2002 | 89 | — | — | 11 | 43 | 35 | 16 | 19 | 5 | 7 | BPI: Gold; MC: Gold | Dutty Rock |
| "Get Busy" | 2003 | 4 | 4 | 3 | — (Note: "Get Busy" did not enter the Canadian Singles Chart, but peaked at number two on the Canada CHR chart.) | 8 | 3 | 1 | 2 | 4 | 1 | ARIA: Gold; ARIA: Gold (Odd Mob Club Mix); BEA: Gold; BPI: 2× Platinum; BVMI: Platinum; IFPI AUT: Gold; IFPI SWI: Gold; MC: 2× Platinum; RIAA: Platinum; SNEP: Gold | Dutty Rock |
| "Like Glue" | 2003 | 20 | 17 | 25 | 6 | 31 | 20 | 17 | 6 | 3 | 13 | BPI: Platinum; MC: Gold | Dutty Rock |
| "I'm Still in Love with You" (featuring Sasha) | 2003 | 20 | 11 | 34 | 20 | 31 | 19 | 35 | 10 | 6 | 14 | BPI: Gold | Dutty Rock |
| "We Be Burnin'" | 2005 | 34 | 10 | 7 | — (Note: "We Be Burnin'" did not enter the Canadian Singles Chart, but peaked at number eleven on the Canada CHR/Pop Top 30 chart.) | 78 | 5 | 6 | 6 | 2 | 6 | BPI: Gold; BVMI: Gold; MC: Gold; RIAA: Platinum | The Trinity |
| "Ever Blazin'" | 2005 | — | 25 | 11 | — | 8 | 20 | 22 | 11 | 12 | — | | The Trinity |
| "Temperature" | 2005 | 5 | 19 | 2 | 2 | 4 | 14 | 3 | 10 | 11 | 1 | ARIA: Gold; BPI: 3× Platinum; BVMI: Platinum; IFPI SWI: Gold; MC: 3× Platinum; RIAA: 3× Platinum | The Trinity |
| "Never Gonna Be the Same" | 2006 | — | — | — (Note: "Never Gonna Be the Same" did not enter the Wallonia Ultratop 50, but peaked at number five on the Ultratip chart.) | — | 10 | — | — | 37 | 22 | — | | The Trinity |
| "(When You Gonna) Give It Up to Me" (featuring Keyshia Cole) | 2006 | 17 | 17 | 14 | 9 | 25 | 26 | 41 | 5 | 24 | 3 | BPI: Platinum; MC: Gold; RIAA: Gold | The Trinity and Step Up soundtrack |
| "Watch Dem Roll" | 2007 | — | — | — | — | — | — | — | — | — | — | | Reggae Gold |
| "So Fine" | 2009 | — | 56 | — (Note: "So Fine" did not enter the Wallonia Ultratop 50, but peaked at number four on the Ultratip chart.) | 56 | 17 | 39 | — | 38 | 25 | 50 | MC: Gold | Imperial Blaze |
| "Press It Up" | 2009 | — | — | — (Note: "Press It Up" did not enter the Wallonia Ultratop 50, but peaked at number eighteen on the Ultratip chart.) | 64 | 40 | — | — | — | — | — | | Imperial Blaze |
| "Hold My Hand" (featuring Keri Hilson) | 2009 | — | — | — (Note: "Hold My Hand" did not enter the Wallonia Ultratop 50, but peaked at number nine on the Ultratip chart.) | 82 | 3 | 60 | — | 37 | — | — | | Imperial Blaze |
| "Got 2 Luv U" (featuring Alexis Jordan) | 2011 | 26 | 7 | 7 | 69 | 4 | 3 | 9 | 1 | 11 | 84 | ARIA: Platinum; BPI: Platinum; BVMI: Platinum; IFPI AUT: Gold; IFPI SWI: Platinum; MC: Gold | Tomahawk Technique |
| "She Doesn't Mind" | 2011 | 46 | 1 | 4 | 49 | 3 | 2 | 31 | 1 | 2 | 78 | BPI: 2× Platinum; BVMI: 3× Gold; IFPI AUT: Platinum; IFPI SWI: 2× Platinum; MC: Platinum | Tomahawk Technique |
| "Hold On" | 2012 | — | — | — (Note: "Hold On" did not enter the Wallonia Ultratop 50, but peaked at number one on the Ultratip chart.) | — | 35 | — | — | — | 86 | — | | Tomahawk Technique |
| "Touch the Sky" (featuring DJ Ammo) | 2012 | — | 44 | — (Note: "Touch the Sky" did not enter the Wallonia Ultratop 50, but peaked at number six on the Ultratip chart.) | — | 139 | 31 | — | — | — | — | | Tomahawk Technique |
| "How Deep Is Your Love" (featuring Kelly Rowland) | 2012 | — | 68 | — | — | — | — | — | 72 | — | — | | Tomahawk Technique |
| "Other Side of Love" | 2013 | 60 | 11 | — (Note: "Other Side of Love" did not enter the Wallonia Ultratop 50, but peaked at number two on the Ultratip chart.) | — | 82 | 3 | — | 4 | 7 | — | BPI: Silver | Full Frequency |
| "Entertainment 2.0" (featuring Juicy J, 2 Chainz and Nicki Minaj) | 2013 | — | — | — | 94 | — | — | — | — | — | — | | Full Frequency |
| "Turn It Up" | 2013 | — | 33 | — (Note: "Turn It Up" did not enter the Wallonia Ultratop 50, but peaked at number eleven on the Ultratip chart.) | — | — | 21 | — | 31 | 35 | — | | Full Frequency |
| "Want Dem All" (featuring Konshens) | 2013 | — | 73 | — (Note: "Want Dem All" did not enter the Wallonia Ultratop 50, but peaked at number eleven on the Ultratip chart.) | — | — | 70 | — | — | — | — | | Full Frequency |
| "Hey Baby" | 2014 | — | 38 | — | — | — | 47 | — | 36 | — | — | | Full Frequency |
| "One Wine" (with Machel Montano featuring Major Lazer) | 2015 | — | — | — | — | — | — | — | — | — | — | | Non-album single |
| "Paradise" (with Matoma featuring KStewart) | 2016 | — | — | — | — | — | — | — | — | — | — | | Hakuna Matoma |
| "Crick Neck" (featuring Chi Ching Ching) | 2016 | — | — | — | — | — | — | — | — | 140 | — | | Non-album single |
| "No Lie" (Note: This song appears on Dua Lipa: Complete Edition) (featuring Dua Lipa) | 2016 | — | 13 | 18 | — | 28 | 10 | 14 | 32 | 10 | — | BPI: 3× Platinum; BVMI: 3× Gold; IFPI AUT: Gold; MC: Platinum; NVPI: Platinum; SNEP: Diamond | Mad Love the Prequel |
| "Tek Weh Yuh Heart" (featuring Tory Lanez) | 2016 | — | — | — | — | — | — | — | — | — | — | | Mad Love the Prequel |
| "Body" (featuring Migos) | 2017 | — | — | — | 98 | — | — | — | — | 76 | — | MC: Gold | Mad Love the Prequel |
| "She Call Me" | 2017 | — | — | — | — | — | — | — | — | — | — | | Non-album single |
| "Mad Love" (with David Guetta featuring Becky G) | 2018 | — | 33 | 30 | 71 | 39 | 10 | 23 | 36 | 22 | — | BPI: Gold; BVMI: Gold; MC: Platinum; SNEP: Platinum | Mad Love the Prequel |
| "Tip Pon It" (with Major Lazer) | 2018 | — | — | — (Note: "Tip Pon It" did not enter the Wallonia Ultratop 50, but peaked at number fourteen on the Ultratip chart.) | — | — | — | — | — | — | — | | Mad Love the Prequel |
| "Feels Like Home" (with Sigala and Fuse ODG featuring Kent Jones) | 2018 | — | — | — (Note: "Feels Like Home" did not enter the Wallonia Ultratop 50, but peaked at number twenty-seven on the Ultratip chart.) | — | — | — | — | — | 71 | — | | Brighter Days |
| "Naked Truth" (featuring Jhené Aiko) | 2018 | — | — | — | — | — | — | — | — | — | — | | Mad Love the Prequel |
| "Hey DJ" (with CNCO and Meghan Trainor) | 2018 | — | — | 22 | — | 53 | — | — | 95 | — | — | SNEP: Gold | Non-album singles |
| "Shot & Wine" (featuring Stefflon Don) | 2019 | — | — | — | — | — | — | — | — | — | — | | Non-album singles |
| "Boasty" (with Wiley and Stefflon Don featuring Idris Elba) | 2019 | — | — | — | — | — | — | — | — | 11 | — | BPI: Platinum | Non-album singles |
| "Contra La Pared" (with J Balvin) | 2019 | — | — | — (Note: "Contra La Pared" did not enter the Wallonia Ultratop 50, but peaked at number seventeen on the Ultratip chart.) | — | 187 | — | 99 | 57 | — | — | RIAA: 3× Platinum (Latin) | Non-album singles |
| "Genna Level" | 2019 | — | — | — | — | — | — | — | — | — | — | | Callaloo Riddim |
| "Fuego" (with DJ Snake and Anitta featuring Tainy) | 2019 | — | — | — (Note: "Fuego" did not enter the Wallonia Ultratop 50, but peaked at number thirty on the Ultratip chart.) | — | — | — | — | — | — | — | | Carte Blanche |
| "When It Comes to You" | 2019 | — | — | — | — | — | — | — | — | — | — | | Non-album single |
| "Buss a Bubble" | 2019 | — | — | — | — | — | — | — | — | — | — | | Fire Stick Riddim |
| "Love Mi Ladies" (with Oryane) | 2020 | — | — | — | — | — | — | — | — | — | — | | Non-album single |
| "Lento" (with Tainy and Mozart La Para featuring Cazzu) | 2020 | — | — | — | — | — | — | — | — | — | — | | Neon16 Tape: The Kids That Grew Up on Reggaeton |
| "Calling on Me" (with Tove Lo) | 2020 | — | — | — (Note: "Calling on Me" did not enter the Wallonia Ultratop 50, but peaked at number six on the Ultratip chart.) | — | 126 | — | — | — | — | — | | Scorcha |
| "Back It Up Deh" | 2020 | — | — | — | — | — | — | — | — | — | — | | Non-album singles |
| "Bad Inna Bed" | 2020 | — | — | — | — | — | — | — | — | — | — | | Non-album singles |
| "Make the Ting Tense" | 2020 | — | — | — | — | — | — | — | — | — | — | | Swiss Cheese Riddim |
| "Scorcha" | 2020 | — | — | — | — | — | — | — | — | — | — | | Scorcha |
| "Chronicles" | 2020 | — | — | — | — | — | — | — | — | — | — | | Non-album single |
| "Lion Heart" | 2020 | — | — | — | — | — | — | — | — | — | — | | Live n Livin |
| "Guns of Navarone" (with Jesse Royal, Stonebwoy & Mutabaruka) | 2020 | — | — | — | — | — | — | — | — | — | — | | Live n Livin |
| "Real Steel" (featuring Intence) | 2021 | — | — | — | — | — | — | — | — | — | — | | Live n Livin |
| "Boom" (with Busy Signal) | 2021 | — | — | — | — | — | — | — | — | — | — | | Live n Livin |
| "Dancing on Dangerous" (with Imanbek featuring Sofía Reyes) | 2021 | — | — | — | — | 61 | — | 44 | 90 | — | — | SNEP: Gold | Non-album singles |
| "Top Celebrity" (with One Time Music) | 2021 | — | — | — | — | — | — | — | — | — | — | | Non-album singles |
| "Pues" (with R3hab and Luis Fonsi) | 2021 | — | — | — | — | — | — | — | — | — | — | | Non-album singles |
| "Only Fanz" (featuring Ty Dolla Sign) | 2021 | — | — | — | — | — | — | — | — | — | — | | Scorcha |
| "Dynamite" (featuring Sia) | 2021 | — | — | 25 | — | 108 | — | — | 92 | — | — | SNEP: Gold | Scorcha |
| "Up" (with Inna) | 2021 | — | — | — | — | 125 | — | — | — | — | — | | Non-album single |
| "How We Do It" (featuring Pia Mia) | 2022 | — | — | — | — | — | — | — | — | — | — | | Scorcha |
| "No Fear" (featuring Damian Marley and Nicky Jam) | 2022 | — | — | — | — | — | — | — | — | — | — | | Scorcha |
| "Light My Fire" (featuring Gwen Stefani and Shenseea) | 2022 | — | — | — | — | — | — | — | — | — | — | | Scorcha |
| "Tic Tac" (with Ludmilla and Topo La Maskara) | 2022 | — | — | — | — | — | — | — | — | — | — | | Non-album singles |
| "Day 2 Day" | 2022 | — | — | — | — | — | — | — | — | — | — | | Non-album singles |
| "No Me Controles" (with Rvssian and Danny Ocean) | 2023 | — | — | — | — | — | — | — | — | — | — | | Non-album singles |
| "Niña Bonita" (with Feid) | 2023 | — | — | — | — | — | — | — | — | — | — | RIAA: 4× Platinum (Latin) | Mor, No Le Temas a la Oscuridad |
| "Rebel Time" (with Beres Hammond) | 2023 | — | — | — | — | — | — | — | — | — | — | | Non-album singles |
| "Summa Hot" | 2023 | — | — | — | — | — | — | — | — | — | — | | Non-album singles |
| "El Vibe" (with Farina) | 2023 | — | — | — | — | — | — | — | — | — | — | | Non-album singles |
| "Dem Time Deh" (with Manuel Turizo) | 2023 | — | — | — | — | — | — | — | — | — | — | | Non-album singles |
| "Greatest" | 2024 | — | — | — | — | — | — | — | — | — | — | | Non-album singles |
| "Light 'Em Up" (with Will Smith) | 2024 | — | — | — | — | — | — | — | — | — | — | | Bad Boys: Ride or Die (soundtrack) |
| "Bring It" | 2024 | — | — | — | — | — | — | — | — | — | — | | Non-album singles |
| "Born to Love Ya" (with Gabry Ponte and Natti Natasha) | 2024 | — | — | — | — | — | — | 76 | — | — | — | | Non-album singles |
| "Let It Talk to Me" (with Inna) | 2025 | — | — | — | — | — | — | — | — | — | — | | Non-album singles |
| "Push 2 Start (Remix)" (with Tyla) | 2025 | — | — | — | — | — | — | — | — | — | — | | Non-album singles |
| "Nah Follow Dem" | 2025 | — | — | — | — | — | — | — | — | — | — | | Non-album singles |
| "Ginger" | 2025 | — | — | — | — | — | — | — | — | — | — | | Non-album singles |
| "Darlin'" (with Luude and Brodie) | 2025 | — | — | — | — | — | — | — | — | — | — | | Non-album singles |
| "Magnificent" (with Supa Hype and Ram Jam) | 2026 | — | — | — | — | — | — | — | — | — | — | | |
"—" denotes a recording that did not chart or was not released in that territory.

=== As featured artist ===
List of singles as a featured artist, with selected chart positions and certifications, showing year released and album name
| Title | Year | Peak chart positions | | | | | | | | | | Certifications | Album |
| Title | Year | AUS | AUT | BEL (WA) | CAN | FRA | GER | NLD | SWI | UK | US | Certifications | Album |
|---|---|---|---|---|---|---|---|---|---|---|---|---|---|
| "Money Jane" (Baby Blue Soundcrew featuring Kardinal Offishall, Jully Black and Sean Paul) | 2000 | — | — | — | 24 | — | — | — | — | — | — | | Private Party Collectors Edition |
| "Bossman" (Beenie Man featuring Sean Paul and Lady Saw) | 2003 | — | — | — | — | — | — | — | — | 78 | — | | Tropical Storm |
| "Make It Clap" (Busta Rhymes featuring Sean Paul and Spliff Star) | 2003 | 61 | — | — | 21 | — | 50 | 15 | — | 16 | 47 | | It Ain't Safe No More |
| "Baby Boy" (Beyoncé featuring Sean Paul) | 2003 | 3 | 18 | 7 | 2 | 8 | 4 | 11 | 5 | 2 | 1 | ARIA: 3× Platinum; BPI: Platinum; BVMI: Gold; MC: Platinum; RIAA: Gold | Dangerously in Love |
| "Breathe" (Blu Cantrell featuring Sean Paul) | 2003 | 8 | 11 | 15 | — | 13 | 7 | 4 | 5 | 1 | 70 | ARIA: Gold; BPI: 2× Platinum; BVMI: Gold | Bittersweet |
| "Cry Baby Cry" (Santana featuring Sean Paul and Joss Stone) | 2005 | — | — | — | 15 | 142 | 47 | 63 | 29 | 71 | — | | All That I Am |
| "Slow Wind" (Remix) (R. Kelly featuring Sean Paul and Akon) | 2005 | — | — | — | — | — | — | — | — | — | — | | Remix City, Volume 1 |
| "Break It Off" (Rihanna featuring Sean Paul) | 2006 | — | — | — | 36 | — | — | — | — | — | 9 | RIAA: Gold | A Girl like Me |
| "Push It Baby" (Pretty Ricky featuring Sean Paul) | 2007 | — | — | — | — | — | 67 | — | — | 120 | — (Note: "Push It Baby" did not enter the Billboard Hot 100, but peaked at number two on the Bubbling Under Hot 100 chart.) | | Late Night Special |
| "Give It to You" (Eve featuring Sean Paul) | 2007 | — | — | — | — | — | 49 | — | — | — | — (Note: "Give It to You" did not enter the Billboard Hot 100, but peaked at number 24 on the Bubbling Under Hot 100 chart.) | | Non-album single |
| "Come Over" (Estelle featuring Sean Paul) | 2008 | — | 55 | — | — | — | 62 | — | — | — | — | | Shine |
| "Lolli Pop" (Farrah Franklin featuring Sean Paul) | 2008 | — | — | — | — | — | — | — | — | — | — | | Miss Farrah |
| "Feel It" (DJ Felli Fel featuring Flo Rida, T-Pain, Sean Paul and Pitbull) | 2009 | — | — | — | — | — | — | — | — | — | — | | Non-album single |
| "Do You Remember" (Jay Sean featuring Sean Paul and Lil Jon) | 2009 | 7 | — | — (Note: "Do You Remember" did not enter the Wallonia Ultratop 50, but peaked at number twelve on the Ultratip chart.) | 11 | 13 | — | — | — | 13 | 10 | ARIA: Platinum; BPI: Platinum; RIAA: 2× Platinum | All or Nothing |
| "Waya Waya" (Tal featuring Sean Paul) | 2011 | — | — | — | — | 72 | — | — | — | — | — | | Le droit de rêver |
| "Summer Paradise" (Simple Plan featuring Sean Paul) | 2012 | 4 | 7 | 16 | 9 | 21 | 9 | 22 | 11 | 12 | — | ARIA: 2× Platinum; BPI: Silver; BVMI: Gold; IFPI AUT: Gold; IFPI SWI: Platinum; MC: 2× Platinum | Get Your Heart On! |
| "Wine It Up" (Lucenzo featuring Sean Paul) | 2012 | — | 34 | — (Note: "Wine It Up" did not enter the Wallonia Ultratop 50, but peaked at number six on the Ultratip chart.) | — | 33 | 48 | 56 | 16 | — | — | | Non-album single |
| "She Makes Me Go" (Arash featuring Sean Paul) | 2012 | — | 8 | 24 | — | 16 | 5 | — | 13 | — | — | BVMI: Gold; IFPI SWI: Gold | Superman |
| "What About Us" (The Saturdays featuring Sean Paul) | 2012 | — | 57 | — (Note: "What About Us" did not enter the Wallonia Ultratop 50, but peaked at number 40 on the Ultratip chart.) | 79 | — | 44 | — | — | 1 | — | BPI: Platinum | Living for the Weekend |
| "Come On to Me" (Major Lazer featuring Sean Paul) | 2014 | — | — | 36 | — | 21 | — | 60 | — | — | — | | Apocalypse Soon |
| "Bailando" (Enrique Iglesias featuring Sean Paul, Descemer Bueno and Gente de Zona) | 2014 | 52 | 42 | 8 | 13 | 23 | 31 | 3 | 4 | 75 | 12 | BPI: Silver; BVMI: Gold; IFPI SWI: Gold; MC: 2× Platinum; RIAA: 4× Platinum | Sex and Love |
| "Dangerous Love" (Fuse ODG featuring Sean Paul) | 2014 | — | — | — | — | — | — | — | — | 3 | — | BPI: Platinum | T.I.N.A. |
| "Ebony Eyes" (Rico Bernasconi with Tuklan featuring A-Class & Sean Paul) | 2015 | — | — | — | — | — | 28 | — | — | — | — | | Non-album single |
| "Make My Love Go" (Jay Sean featuring Sean Paul) | 2016 | — | 52 | — (Note: "Make My Love Go" did not enter the Wallonia Ultratop 50, but peaked at number 33 on the Ultratip chart.) | — | — | 22 | 22 | 48 | 49 | — | BPI: Silver; NVPI: Platinum | TBA |
| "Cheap Thrills" (Sia featuring Sean Paul) | 2016 | 6 | 1 | 1 | 1 | 1 | 1 | 3 | 2 | 2 | 1 | ARIA: 4× Platinum; BEA: 3× Platinum; BPI: 5× Platinum; BVMI: Diamond; IFPI AUT: Platinum; MC: Diamond; RIAA: 8× Platinum | This Is Acting |
| "Lay You Down Easy" (Magic! featuring Sean Paul) | 2016 | 91 | — | — | 36 | — | — | — | — | — | — | MC: Gold | Primary Colours |
| "Ride It" (Borgeous, Rvssian and M.R.I. featuring Sean Paul) | 2016 | — | — | — | — | — | — | — | — | — | — | | 14 |
| "Hair" (Little Mix featuring Sean Paul) | 2016 | 10 | — | — | — | 137 | — | — | — | 11 | — | ARIA: 2× Platinum; BPI: Platinum | Get Weird |
| "Trumpets" (Sak Noel and Salvi featuring Sean Paul) | 2016 | — | — | 43 | — | 89 | — | 22 | — | — | — | NVPI: Platinum | Non-album single |
| "Rockabye" (Clean Bandit featuring Sean Paul and Anne-Marie) | 2016 | 1 | 1 | 1 | 4 | 4 | 1 | 1 | 1 | 1 | 9 | ARIA: 5× Platinum; BEA: 2× Platinum; BPI: 4× Platinum; BVMI: 2× Platinum; IFPI AUT: Platinum; IFPI SWI: 2× Platinum; MC: 9× Platinum; NVPI: 5× Platinum; RIAA: 3× Platinum; SNEP: Diamond | What Is Love? |
| "Ovaload" (Gentleman featuring Sean Paul) | 2017 | — | — | — | — | — | 78 | — | — | — | — | | The Selection |
| "Súbeme La Radio" (Remix) (Enrique Iglesias featuring Sean Paul and Matt Terry) | 2017 | — | — | — | — | — | — | 51 | — | 10 | — | BPI: Platinum | Trouble |
| "Gold" (Valentino Khan featuring Sean Paul) | 2017 | — | — | — | — | — | — | — | — | — | — | | Major Lazer Presents: Give Me Future |
| "Weed Problems" (Chi Ching Ching featuring Sean Paul) | 2018 | — | — | — | — | — | — | — | — | — | — | | Turning Tables |
| "Life We Living" (Squash featuring Sean Paul) | 2019 | — | — | — | — | — | — | — | — | — | — | | TBA |
| "Born Gyallis" (Chimney Records featuring Sean Paul) | 2019 | — | — | — | — | — | — | — | — | — | — | | Aircraft Riddim |
| "Times Like These" (as part of Live Lounge Allstars) | 2020 | — | — | — | — | — | — | — | — | 1 | — | | Non-album single |
| "Dem Nuh Ready Yet" (Leftside featuring Sean Paul) | 2020 | — | — | — | — | — | — | — | — | — | — | | Live n Livin |
| "Mambo" (Steve Aoki and Willy William featuring El Alfa, Sean Paul, Sfera Ebbasta and Play-N-Skillz) | 2021 | — | — | — | — | — | — | — | — | — | — | | Non-album single |
| "Boca" (Gaia featuring Sean Paul) | 2021 | — | — | — | — | — | — | — | — | — | — | | Alma |
| "Go Down Deh" (Spice featuring Sean Paul and Shaggy) | 2021 | — | — | — | — | — | — | — | — | — | — | MC: Platinum | 10 |
| "Terminator" (King Promise featuring Sean Paul and Tiwa Savage) | 2023 | — | — | — | — | — | — | — | — | — | — | | Non-album single |
"—" denotes a recording that did not chart or was not released in that territory.

== Other charted songs ==
List of other charted songs, with selected chart positions, showing year released and album name
| Title | Year | Peak chart positions | | | | Album |
| Title | Year | SPA | US Bub. | US Bub. R&B | US Rhyth. | Album |
|---|---|---|---|---|---|---|
| "International Affair" (Mark Ronson featuring Sean Paul and Tweet) | 2003 | — | — | 7 | 21 | Here Comes the Fuzz |
| "Dem Not Ready" (50 Cent featuring Sean Paul) | 2003 | — | — | 23 | — | Bulletproof (G-Unit Pt. 5) |
| "Intro: Chi Chi Ching" | 2009 | — | 10 | — | — | Imperial Blaze |
| "Kármika" (with Karol G and Bad Gyal) | 2023 | 19 | 17 | — | — | Mañana Será Bonito |
| "Ba Ba Bad Remix" (with Kybba, Ryan Castro and Busy Signal) | 2025 | 32 | — | — | — | Non-album song |
"—" denotes a recording that did not chart or was not released in that territory.

== Guest appearances ==
List of non-single guest appearances, with other performing artists, showing year released and album name
| Title | Year | Other artist(s) | Album |
|---|---|---|---|
| "Top Shotter" | 1998 | DMX, Mr. Vegas | Belly |
| "Ladies' Man" | 2001 | Spanner Banner | Real Love |
| "Lovey Dovey Stuff" | 2001 | Geri Halliwell | |
| "Money Jane" (Remix) | 2001 | Kardinal Offishall, Jully Black | Quest for Fire: Firestarter, Vol. 1 |
| "Hey Sexy Lady" (Original Sting International Mix) | 2002 | Shaggy, Brian and Tony Gold | Lucky Day |
| "What They Gonna Do" | 2002 | Jay-Z | The Blueprint 2: The Gift & The Curse |
| "Hey Sexy Lady" (Remix) | 2003 | Shaggy, Brian and Tony Gold, Will Smith | Riddim Driven: Sexy Lady Explosion & Reggae Gold 2003 |
| "Shoot Em Up" | 2003 | G-Unit | Automatic Gunfire |
| "Cruise Control" | 2003 | Kylie Minogue | Body Language Special Edition |
| "Things Come & Go" | 2003 | Mýa | Moodring |
| "International Affair" | 2003 | Mark Ronson, Tweet | Here Comes the Fuzz |
| "Three Little Birds" | 2004 | Ziggy Marley | Shark Tale (soundtrack) |
| "It's Alright" | 2004 | Fabolous | Real Talk |
| "I Wanna Love You" (Remix) | 2006 | Akon | |
| "Always on My Mind" | 2007 | Da'Ville | On My Mind |
| "Back It Up" | 2008 | Mr. Evil | |
| "Hit 'Em" | 2008 | Fahrenheit, Jigzagula | |
| "Dangerous" (Remix) | 2008 | Kardinal Offishall, Akon | Not 4 Sale |
| "She's Fine" | 2008 | DJ Khaled, Missy Elliott, Busta Rhymes | We Global |
| "Dangerous" (Second Remix) | 2008 | Akon, Kardinal Offishall, Twista | The Freedom Mixtape |
| "Paradise" (Remix) | 2008 | Mýa | Sugar & Spice |
| "Save a Life" (Charity single) | 2009 | Shaggy, Gramps Morgan, Christopher Martin, Etana, Da'Ville, Marcia Griffiths, Luciano, Tessanne Chin, Freddie McGregor, Elephant Man, D-Lynx, D-Major | |
| "Brown Skin Girl" | 2010 | Chris Brown, Rock City | Graffiti |
| "Follow Me" | 2010 | Sean Kingston | |
| "Rise Again" (Digital Haiti Relief single) | 2010 | Shaggy, Sean Kingston, Alison Hinds, Shontelle, Edwin Yearwood, Destra Garcia, David Rudder, KesDieffenthaller, Tessanne Chin, Etana, BélO | |
| "Your Love" (Remix) | 2010 | Nicki Minaj | |
| "Giving Her the Grind" | 2010 | Nelly | 5.0 |
| "Rear View Mirror" | 2011 | Mýa | K.I.S.S. |
| "Shake Señora" (Remix) | 2011 | Pitbull, T-Pain, Ludacris | Planet Pit |
| "4 AM" (Remix) | 2012 | Melanie Fiona | |
| "Minha Lady Lady" | 2012 | Lucenzo | Emigrante del Mundo |
| "My Only" | 2012 | Jay Sean, Pharrell | Neon |
| "Tik Tok" | 2012 | Bob Sinclar | Disco Crash |
| "Baby Danger" | 2014 | Wisin | El Regreso del Sobreviviente |
| "Passion Wine" | 2014 | Farruko | Farruko Presenta: Los Menores |
| "I Came To Dance" | 2014 | Britney Spears | Britney Jean |
| "Loaded" | 2014 | Koda Kumi | Bon Voyage |
| "Party Tun Up" (Remix) | 2014 | Mr Vegas, Fatman Scoop | Bruk It Down 2.0 |
| "Ah Leke" | 2014 | Pitbull | Globalization |
| "Luv" (Remix) | 2016 | Tory Lanez | |
| "Let Me Love You" (Remix) | 2016 | DJ Snake, Justin Bieber | Encore |
| "Rich & Famous" | 2019 | Koda Kumi | Re(cord) |
| "Love Mi Ladies" | 2020 | Oryane | |
| "Really Love (R3HAB Remix)" | 2020 | KSI, Craig David, Digital Farm Animals, R3HAB | |
| "No Sales de Mi Cabeza" | 2022 | Wisin & Yandel | La Ultima Mision |
| "Gyal Generals" | 2023 | Charly Black | No Excuses |
| "Kármika" | 2023 | Karol G, Bad Gyal | Mañana Será Bonito |
| "Light Em Up" | 2024 | Will Smith | Bad Boys: Ride or Die (soundtrack) |
| "Call My Name (Remix)" | 2024 | J'calm | |

== Music videos ==
=== As lead artist ===
List of music videos as a lead artist, with directors, showing year released
| Title | Year | Director(s) |
|---|---|---|
| "Nice Time" (with Carrot Jarrett) | 1994 | David Borely |
| "Ladies' Man" (with Spanner Banner) | 1997 | Bill Schacht |
| "(Haffi Get De Gal Ya) Hot Gal Today" | 1998 | Kevin Lee |
| "Deport Them" | 1999 | Jessy Terrero |
| "Gimme the Light" | 2002 | Little X |
| "Get Busy" | 2003 | Little X |
| "Like Glue" | 2003 | Benny Boom |
| "I'm Still in Love with You" (featuring Sasha) | 2004 | Little X |
| "We Be Burnin'" | 2005 | Jessy Terrero |
| "Ever Blazin'" | 2005 | Anthony Mandler |
| "Temperature" | 2006 | Little X, RT! |
| "Never Gonna Be the Same" | 2006 | Jessy Terrero |
| "Give It Up to Me" (featuring Keyshia Cole) | 2006 | Little X |
| "Watch Dem Roll" | 2007 | Jessy Terrero |
| "So Fine" | 2009 | Ray Kay |
| "Press It Up" | 2009 | Jessy Terrero |
| "Hold My Hand" | 2009 | Lil X |
| "Now That I've Got Your Love" | 2009 | Lil X |
| "Tik Tok" | 2009 | Hype Williams |
| "Got 2 Luv U" | 2011 | Ben Mor |
| "She Doesn't Mind" | 2011 | Evan Winter |
| Touch the Sky (featuring DJ Ammo) | 2011 | Davy Duhamel |
| "How Deep Is Your Love" (featuring Kelly Rowland) | 2012 | Juwan Lee |
| "Dream Girl" | 2012 | |
| "Never Give Up" | 2015 | JA Productions |
| "Ride It" (with Borgeous, Rvssian and M.R.I) | 2016 | |
| "No Lie" (featuring Dua Lipa) | 2017 | Tim Nackashi |
| "Tek Weh Yuh Heart" (featuring Tory Lanez) | 2017 | Stash Box Productions & Karena Evans |
| "Body" (featuring Migos) | 2017 | Daps |
| "Ovaload" (with Gentleman) | 2017 | Kingstone Entertainment |
| "Gold" (with Valentino Khan) | 2017 | Lil Internet |
| "Rolling" (with Shenseea) | 2017 | Rogen "Ruption" Walker |
| "Mad Love" (with David Guetta featuring Becky G) | 2018 | Sarah McColgan |
| "Tip Pon It" (with Major Lazer) | 2018 | Alexandre Courtès |
| "Naked Truth" (featuring Jhené Aiko) | 2018 | Michael Garcia |
| "Shot & Wine" (featuring Stefflon Don) | 2019 | Carly Cussen |
| "Contra La Pared" (with J Balvin) | 2019 | Andy Hines |
| "Buss a Bubble" | 2019 | Jonathan Poirier |
| "Calling on Me" (with Tove Lo) | 2020 | Andy Hines |
| "Back It Up Deh" | 2020 | Kieran Khan |
| "Guns of Navarone" (with Jesse Royal, Stonebwoy and Mutabaruka) | 2021 | Fernando Hevia |
| "Scorcha" | 2021 | Jay Will |
| "Boom" (with Busy Signal) | 2021 | Kieran Khan |
| "Lion Heart" | 2021 | Kieran Khan |
| "Real Steel" (featuring Intence) | 2021 | Kieran Khan |
| "Only Fanz" (featuring Ty Dolla Sign) | 2021 | Myles Whittingham |
| "Dynamite" (featuring Sia) | 2021 | Storm Saulter |
| "How We Do It" (featuring Pia Mia) | 2022 | Briana Gonzales |

=== As featured artist ===
List of music videos as a featured artist, with directors, showing year released
| Title | Year | Director(s) |
|---|---|---|
| "Money Jane" (with Kardinal Offishall) | 2000 | Kevin De Freitas |
| "Make It Clap" (with Busta Rhymes) | 2003 | Erik White & Busta Rhymes |
| "Baby Boy" (with Beyoncé) | 2003 | Jake Nava |
| "Bossman" (with Beenie Man) | 2003 | Jeremy Rall |
| "Breathe" (with Blu Cantrell) | 2003 | Hype Williams |
| "Cry Baby Cry" (with Carlos Santana and Joss Stone) | 2006 | Chris Robinson |
| "Give It to You" (with Eve) | 2007 | Melina |
| "Come Over" (with Estelle) | 2008 | Lil X |
| "Do You Remember" | 2009 | Gil Green |
| "Summer Paradise" (with Simple Plan) | 2012 | Simple Plan |
| "What About Us" (with The Saturdays) | 2013 | Sarah Chatfield |
| "Hair" (with Little Mix) | 2016 | Director X |
| "Trumpets" (with Sak Noel and Salvi) | 2016 | Dani Feixas |
| "Cheap Thrills" (with Sia) | 2016 | Sia, Daniel Askill |
| "Rockabye" (with Clean Bandit and Anne-Marie) | 2016 | Jack Patterson, Grace Chatto |
