= Arif Cooper =

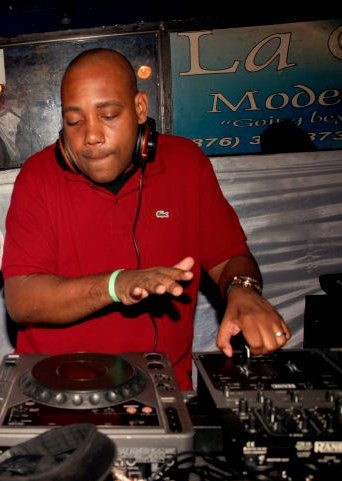
- DJ Arif 'SupaCoop' Cooper

Background information
- Also known as: DJ SupaCoop
- Origin: Kingston, Jamaica
- Died: 5 March 2023
- Genres: Reggae, Dancehall, House
- Occupations: Musician, Producer, DJ, CEO, Radio Broadcaster, Event Promoter
- Instruments: Piano, Drums, Keyboards, Sampler, Turntables
- Years active: 1991–2023
- Label: Fresh Ear Productions/AMC Music Ltd.

Arif Michael Cooper (died 5 March 2023) was a Jamaican musician, music producer, and international DJ. He was the CEO of Fresh Ear Productions/AMC Music Ltd., as well as a radio broadcaster for the RJR Communications Group (FAME FM).

== Biography ==
Arif Cooper grew up around music from birth. His father, Michael "Ibo" Cooper from Third World, introduced him to the music industry from a young age, putting him through piano lessons, exposure to a large record collection as well as allowing him access to watch musicians such as Stevie Wonder, Bob Marley, Bruce Springsteen and Sting in various studio and show settings. When Arif was old enough, Ibo brought him on tour to work with Third World as a road crew member.

In 1991, based on his past exposure to the Jamaican sound system culture, Cooper began DJing everything from house parties and local dances to nightclubs, and not long after, international festivals, and major international dancehall events. He was a founding member of Syndicate Disco in 1992-1997 and after leaving went on to establish himself internationally, DJing all over the world at clubs, parties and shows in New York, Miami, Los Angeles, Houston, Atlanta and Japan. He has held residencies at Club Mirage, Jamaica and Club Soul, Atlanta and also toured with artists such as Sean Paul, Voice Mail, and Alaine.

Fresh Ear Productions was founded in 1997 when, after working on the development of 2 Hard Records, Cooper re-entered the world of production. Additionally, in 1998 he joined FAME FM in the capacity of broadcaster/radio disc jockey where he still held this position. Cooper was also the major force between the street event ‘Fresh Fridays' circa 2010-2014. He has played key roles in the development and careers of Vybz Kartel, Sean Paul, Tami Chynn, Jah Cure, Alaine, Elephant Man, Baby Cham, Demarco, Aidonia, Konshens, Wayne Marshall, Christopher Martin and Charly Black. He has created hit singles in a wide variety of genres from Sean Paul's "Hold My Hand", Tami Chynn's "Over and Over", Demarco's "True Friend" to rhythms as widely successful as Guardian Angel, Relationships, Worldwide, and New Money.

Cooper collapsed suddenly and died during an event on 5 March 2023.

== Discography ==
=== Albums ===
- Celebration
- Phantom
- Move
- Full Draw
- R.A.W (Ready And Willing)
- Guardian Angel
- Up & Live
- Revolution
- Relationships
- Perfect 10
- Sexy Girl
- National Pride
- Eva Ready
- Win
- Big Bang
- Communication
- Good Tymez
- New Money
- Worldwide
- Success & Strive
- Give Praises

=== Singles ===
- "Step Out" - Busy Signal
- "Jigga Jigga" - Looga Man ft Cecile
- "My World" - Kris Kelly
- "Danger Zone" - Lord Kossity
- "Limited" - Muneihiro
- "Imperial Blaze" - Sean Paul
- "JMT (Jamaica Mean Time)" - Vybz Kartel
- "Forever" - Vybz Kartel
- "Unknown Language" - T.O.K
- "One World" - T.O.K
- "Gideon Boot" - Richie Spice
- "Wifey" - Alkaline
- "Hype" - Alkaline
- "Beautiful Sister" - Alaine, Tami Chynn, Tessane Chin, Queen Ifrica
- "True Friend" - Demarco
- "Nuh Guh Change (One Cent)" - Demarco
- "Build A Vibes" - Demarco
- "Meant To Be" - I Octane
- "This Life (Glory)" - Konshens
- "Give Thanks For Life" - Mr. Vegas
- "Hot Rice Dance" - Mr. Vegas
- "Emporror Salassi" - Rude Bwoy Face
- "Love Meter Buck" - Tony Matterhorn
- "F**k Meter Buck" - Tony Matterhorn
- "Credit Alone Done" - Vybz Kartel
- "Party Mi Say" - Vybz Kartel
- "In Love With You" - Vybz Kartel
