= Demarco (musician) =

Jamaican musician (born 1982)

- Born: Collin Demar Edwards; 28 September 1982 (age 44)
- Origin: Portmore, St. Catherine Parish, Jamaica
- Genres: Reggae fusion, dancehall
- Occupations: Deejay, producer
- Years active: 2003–present
- Label: True Gift Ent. LLC
- Website: https://demarcodadon.com/

Collin Demar Edwards (born 28 September 1982), better known by his stage name Demarco, is a Jamaican dancehall and reggae musician.

== Music ==
Born in Portmore, St. Catherine Parish, Edwards gained his early experience performing at the Cactus nightclub at the age of 15, and was a selector for the Future Disco sound system. At the age of 16 he relocated to the US where he worked to fund his interest in music production, and began creating tracks for hip hop and dancehall artists.

He is best known for his hit singles "Duppy Know Ah Who Fi Frighten", featuring on the Shoot Out Riddim, "Fallen Soldiers", "True Friend" and "Show It (So Sexy)". He also produced the Top Speed Riddim where he recorded the song "Gal Dem Want" with the Alliance leader Bounty Killer. In 2008 Demarco produced the Big League Riddim and recorded "Broomie" with Elephant Man and his own song "Spend Pon Dem". One Year later he produced a hit Riddim called Stress Free which had many hit songs like "Jump and Wine" by Tony Matterhorn, "Hammering" by Singing Craig, "Work Mi Ah Work" by Mister G and his own "She Can't Wait".

He recorded a remix to Rihanna's Billboard #1 hit "Rude Boy".

Demarco with his hit single Good Book has been nominated male deejay of the year in Britain.

Demarco has toured extensively, including multiple visits to Africa, performing in Ghana, Uganda, Kenya, Zimbabwe, Tanzania, and Guinea.

He was nominated for an Urban Music Award for 'Best Reggae Act' in 2013, and again in 2014.

In December 2013 he was reportedly recording his debut album.

Demarco, who is founder of True Gift Entertainment produces their own music videos and reality TV series

Demarco recently signed his first artist to his label by the name of Raytid who later left the label record, due to the belief the record label was not doing good on promoting his music.

In May 2017 Demarco moved to Georgia and was signed under Akon's record label, EnTREEGRECORDS/KONLIVE Recordlabel. Following leaving Akon's label Demarco released an EP on December 6, 2019, title "2020 Vision". On April 16, 2021, Demarco released his debut album " Melody " under Ineffable Records. This album features guest appearances from Sean Paul on "My Way" Sarkodie on for you. He enlisted the queen of dancehall Spice on " Any Man" Chronic Law on " Travel Safe" Bounty Killer & Beenie Man on "Homage" Konshens on "Mover" Ky-Mani Marley on "Mama" and Shaggy on "Do It Again".

== Discography ==
=== Albums ===
- Untitled (promo CD) (2008)
- 2020 Vision (EP 2019)
- Melody (2021)

=== Singles ===
- 2022: "Twerk"
- 2021: "Fallen"
- 2021: "Do It Again"
- 2021: "Ryda"
- 2021: "Dance My Stress Away"
- 2021: "Mover"
- 2020: "Boogie Woogie"
- 2019" "Till My Time Come"
- 2018: "Shaku Wine"
- 2017: "No Wahala" (featuring Akon) & Runtown
- 2016: "Backaz"
- 2015: "Celebrate My Life"
- 2014: "Love de gyal dem good"
- 2014: "Bun Up Road"
- 2014: "Flick"
- 2014: "Allergic to Badmind friend"
- 2013: "Lazy Body"
- 2013: Fuck Yuh wah fuck
- 2013: "Continue Whine"
- 2012: "Broad Out"
- 2012: "Real Gallis" (Dial Out Riddim)
- 2012: "Wine"
- 2012: "6:30"
- 2011: "I Love My Life"
- 2011: "Hear My Cry"
- 2011: "Rest it at mi foot"
- 2011: "Wake Up di Scheme"
- 2011: "Iron Bird"
- 2010: "Show It (So Sexy)" (featuring Craig of Voicemail)
- 2010: "Never Gonna Let You Go" (featuring Thelma Aoyama)
- 2009: "She Can't Wait"
- 2009: "True Friend"
- 2009: "Kings & Queens" (featuring Sizzla)
- 2008: "Standing Soldier"
- 2008: "Our World" (featuring Elephant Man)
- 2007: "Fallen Soldiers"

=== Features ===
- 2022: "Jiggle" (featuring Spice & Meeka)
- 2021: "Ndiwe"featuring Nutty O
- 2016: "Watch Di Money(featuring Cyanide)
- 2016: "Mama"(featuring Kymani Marley)
- 2016: "Wine It Slow"(featuring Bunji Garlin)
- 2015: "Good Things"(featuring J Capri)
- 2015: "Ghetto Youths Floss"(featuring Beenie Man)
- 2014: "Badman Place"(featuring Jah Vinci)
- 2013: "Lazy Body"(featuring Hotta Maestro)
- 2013: "Badder Dan Most(Official Remix)"(featuring Redsan)
- 2012: "#1" (featuring Karl Wolf)
- 2010: "Never Gonna Let You Go" (featuring Thelma Aoyama)
- 2010: "Push It" (featuring Ce'Cile)
- 2010: "Show It (So Sexy)" (featuring Craig of Voicemail)
- 2010: "Show It (So Sexy) Remix" (featuring Sheek Louch, J.Reu, 2 Pistols, and Craig)
- 2009: "Listen"(featuring Christopher Martin)
- 2009: "3 Anthem" (featuring Delly Ranx)
- 2009: "Hustler" (featuring Busta Rhymes)
- 2009: "Paper Chasing" (featuring Konshens)
- 2009: "Kings & Queens" (featuring Sizzla)
- 2009: "Woman Problem" (featuring Mister G)
- 2009: "Can I" (featuring Etana)
- 2009: "Iron Bird"
- 2008: "Over & Over" (featuring Tarrus Riley)
- 2008: "Our World" (featuring Elephant Man)
- 2008: "Blessings and Multiply" (featuring Da'Ville)
- 2008: "For You" (featuring Ishawna)
- 2008: "Seen My Gun" (featuring Elephant Man)
- 2007: "Nuh Joint Dat" (featuring Bugle)

== Guest appearances ==
- 2026: "Live Like Remix" - UDKyng (featuring Demarco)
- 2018: "Love to See You Dance" – I-Octane(featuring Demarco)
- 2018: "See Flowers (Official Remix)" – NJAR(featuring Demarco)(Eighty8)(Eon Jarvs)
- 2017: "Predictable" – Akon (featuring Demarco)(Tone Tone)
- 2017: "Bae Bae" – Kelvin Boj (featuring Demarco)(Wande Coal)
- 2017: "High" – Eva Shaw (featuring Shaggy and Demarco)
- 2017: "Set It Off" – Demetria McKinney (featuring Demarco)
- 2017: "So Good" – Lexy Panterra (featuring Demarco)
- 2017: "All You Can Handle" – Adam Saleh (featuring Demarco)
- 2017: "Say It" – Stonebwoy (featuring Demarco)
- 2017: "Friendzone" – Faydee (featuring Demarco)
- 2016: "Miracle" – Vybz Kartel (featuring Demarco)(Keda)
- 2016: "Feelin U" – Kick Raux (featuring Demarco) (featuring Tyga) (featuring Ayo Jay) (featuring Doctor)
- 2016: "Like Google" – Vybz Kartel (featuring Demarco)
- 2015: "Bloodclaute Song Remix (Official) – Future Fambo" (featuring Demarco)(featuring Sean Paul) (featuring Beenie Man)
- 2015: "My Queen" – Imar Shephard (featuring Demarco)
- 2014: "Badder Dan Most (Official Remix) – Redsan(featuring Demarco)
- 2014: "Blessings" – Peter Miles (featuring Demarco)
- 2011: "Hope" – Collie Buddz (featuring Demarco)
- 2009: "For You" – Ishawna (featuring Demarco)
- 2008: "Bad Boy Street" – Booba (featuring Demarco)
- 2008: "She Wanna Rude Bwoy" – Foxy Brown (featuring Demarco)

== Filmography ==
- 2008: Manchester Fiesta 2008, Part 1
- 2008: Champions in Action, Vol. 1
- 2008: Teen Splash 2008, Vol.2
- 2016: King of the Dancehall
- 2014–2016: Talk Yuh Mind

Live recordings from concerts given by Demarco, Mavado, Bounty Killer, Busy Signal, Shaggy and Beenie Man.

== Video games ==
- Grand Theft Auto V (2013) Blue Ark – Loyals
