= Imperial Blaze =

Studio album by Sean Paul
- Released: 18 August 2009
- Recorded: Kingston, Jamaica
- Studios: 2 Hard Studios; Big Ship Studios; Coppershot Studios; Fresh Ear Studios; Vendetta Studios
- Genre: Dancehall
- Length: 66:49
- Labels: VP; Atlantic
- Producers: Stephen "Di Genius" McGregor; Don Corleon; Supacoop; Leftside; Jigzag; Delano Thomas; Supa Dups

Sean Paul chronology
The Trinity (2005)	Imperial Blaze (2009)	Tomahawk Technique (2012)

Singles from Imperial Blaze
- 1. "So Fine" Released: 2 June 2009; 2. "Press It Up" Released: 4 August 2009; 3. "Hold My Hand" Released: 29 September 2009

Imperial Blaze is the fourth studio album by the Jamaican rapper and singer Sean Paul. It was released by VP Records and Atlantic Records on 18 August 2009 in the United States. Produced primarily by Stephen "Di Genius" McGregor, the album was initially intended to move away from party-oriented songs in favor of addressing youth violence in Jamaica, though the final release largely consists of up-tempo party tracks. According to Paul, the album's title, meaning "King's Fire", symbolizes energy and intensity.

The album received polarizing reviews, with some critics praising Paul's energy, dancefloor appeal, and roots-focused production, while others criticized the album as repetitive or declining in quality. Imperial Blaze achieved strong international chart success, including gold certification in France, top-ten positions in several countries, and became the first Jamaican-origin album to debut at number one on the US Billboard Top Rap Albums chart, selling 28,500 copies in its first week and 101,000 by 2012.

== Background ==
The album was originally scheduled for release in the summer of 2007 under the working title The Next Thing, but was later postponed to November 2008. In an interview with MTV News, Sean Paul stated that he intended to move away from party-oriented songs such as "Get Busy", "We Be Burnin'", and "Temperature", and instead focus on themes addressing youth violence in Jamaica. However, the final version of the album largely consisted of up-tempo party tracks. As a result, Paul later released a mixtape that more directly explored issues related to youth violence in Jamaica. The album's title translates to "King's Fire". Commenting on its meaning, Sean Paul explained that it was not meant to portray him as a king, but rather as a source of energy and intensity, stating, "I'm not the king. I'm the fire, I'm the flame, I'm the energy." In an interview with DJ Swerve, Sean Paul also revealed that he recorded approximately 60 tracks for the project, with 19 ultimately selected for the final track listing.

== Promotion ==
The album's lead single, "So Fine", reached the top 20 in France and Turkey and peaked at number 50 on the US Billboard Hot 100. Following it, "Press It Up" was released on 4 August 2009 and premiered on Sean Paul's official website on 10 July. Its accompanying music video, directed by Jessy Terrero, debuted on 9 September 2009. The third single, "Hold My Hand", featuring Keri Hilson, was sent to U.S. radio on 29 September 2009, completing the album’s primary single lineup.

== Reception ==
Professional ratings
Aggregate scores
Source	Rating
Metacritic	44/100
Review scores
Source	Rating
AllMusic	3.5/5 stars
Entertainment Weekly	B+
Now	3/5 stars
PopMatters	1/10
Q	3/5 stars
RapReviews	3/10
Rolling Stone	2/5 stars
Slant Magazine	1.5/5 stars
Toronto Star	2.5/4 stars
USA Today	3/4 stars

Initial critical response to Imperial Blaze was mixed. At Metacritic, which assigns a normalized rating out of 100 to reviews from mainstream critics, the album has received an average score of 44, based on seven reviews, indicating "mixed or average" reviews. Despite this, the album was nominated for Best Reggae Album at the 52nd Annual Grammy Awards.

USA Today editor Steve Jones found that Paul's "music's intensity is as hot as ever. [He] has lost none of his penchant for sexy club scorchers, and percussive first single "So Fine" sets the tone early on [...] He's also avoided trendy hip-hop and R&B producers, relying instead on up-and-coming Jamaican producers like Stephen "Di Genius" McGregor to maintain his edge. He smartly sticks to his roots, and shows no signs of flaming out." Entertainment Weekly's Simon Vozick-Levinson found that "Paul's limitless energy carries him through these 20 tracks, helping him tap-dance over every flashy dancehall riddim that comes his way. The album sags toward the middle, but when he sticks to his strengths, Paul is arguably the ablest pop ambassador Jamaican music has ever had who isn't surnamed Marley." Now critic Jason Richards felt that Imperial Blaze was picking up "exactly where The Trinity left off: at the centre of the dance floor. [...] He delivers a new set of sleek mashup anthems about how you're "So Fine" he'd like to see you in your "Birthday Suit" so he can "Press It Up" at his "Private Party."

Tim Sendra of AllMusic gave the album three and a half out of five stars, praising the sound of the album. He found that "it may bode ill for the commercial prospects of the album, but it does mean that the people who do buy Imperial Blaze will be purchasing a record that is very good, and more importantly, a great deal of fun from beginning to end." Jay Soul of RapReviews gave the album a negative, stating: "It's almost like watching a heavyweight champion past his prime being forced to fight, when all he wants to do is quit the game and be a coach." Christian Hoard, writing for Rolling Stone, gave the album a 2/5 rating, describing the album as "pale versions of past hits." Slant Magazine critic Jesse Cataldo concluded: "Heard at a party or a club, his songs may have a certain offhand charm; in a row they form a bland marathon that's a challenge to take on," while Michael Miller from PopMatters called Imperial Blaze the "worst album of 2009".

== Critical reception ==
The album was made available for pre-order on 17 July 2009. Customers who pre-ordered the album received two digital bonus tracks, "She Wanna Be Down" and "Get with It Girl". In Germany, Imperial Blaze was released digitally via the iTunes Store on 14 August 2009.

Imperial Blaze was certified gold in France and achieved strong chart debuts internationally, reaching number four in Switzerland, number eight in France, number five in Canada, number fifteen in Belgium, number seventeen in Austria, and number seventeen in Germany. In the United States, Imperial Blaze became first album of Jamaican origin to debut at number one on Billboard's Top Rap Albums chart, while also reaching number three on the Top R&B/Hip-Hop Albums chart, and number twelve on the Billboard 200, with first-week sales of 28,500 copies. By January 2012, it had sold 101,000 copies in the United States.

== Track listing ==
- Sean Paul Henriques co-wrote all of the songs on the album; additional writers are listed below.

No.	Title	Writer(s)	Producer(s)	Length
1.	"Intro: Chi Ching Ching"			0:50
2.	"Lace It"	Stephen McGregor	Di Genius	2:51
3.	"So Fine"	S. McGregor; Nigel Staff	Di Genius	3:30
4.	"Now That I've Got Your Love"	S. McGregor	Di Genius	3:33
5.	"Birthday Suit"	S. McGregor	Di Genius	3:25
6.	"Press It Up"	S. McGregor	Di Genius	3:43
7.	"Evening Ride"	Jeremy Harding; S. McGregor	Di Genius	3:56
8.	"Hold My Hand" (featuring Keri Hilson)	Arif Cooper; Clayton Morrison	Supacoop	3:26
9.	"She Want Me"	J. Harding; S. McGregor	Di Genius	3:05
10.	"Daddy's Home"	S. McGregor	Di Genius	3:30
11.	"Bruk Out"	Craig Parks	Leftside	3:24
12.	"Pepperpot"	S. Anderson; Andrew McIntyre; Jason Henriques	Jigzag	3:50
13.	"Wine Baby Wine"	J. Harding	Mister Harding	3:04
14.	"Running Out of Time"	Donovan Bennett; J. Henriques	Don Corleon	3:21
15.	"Don't Tease Me"	S. McGregor	Di Genius	3:19
16.	"Lately"	S. McGregor	Di Genius	3:06
17.	"She Wanna Be Down"	S. McGregor	Di Genius	3:37
18.	"Straight from My Heart"	Andrew Thompson; Delano Thomas; Dwayne Chin-Quee; Mitchum Chin; Cezar Cunningham	Delano Thomas; Supa Dups	4:26
19.	"Private Party"	Donovan Bennett; J. Henriques	Don Corleon	3:34
20.	"I Know U Like It"	J. Henriques	Sean Paul	3:07
Total length:				66:49

Japan bonus track
No.	Title	Writer(s)	Producer(s)	Length
21.	"Get with It Girl"	D. Bennett; D. Lewis	Don Corleon	3:06

French bonus track
No.	Title	Writer(s)	Producer(s)	Length
21.	"Hold My Hand" (featuring Zaho)	Arif Cooper; Clayton Morrison; Zaho	Supascoop	3:26

Spotify and TTNET Müzik bonus track
No.	Title	Length
21.	"Right Time"	3:24

iTunes Store deluxe edition bonus tracks
No.	Title	Writer(s)	Producer(s)	Length
21.	"Agarra Mi Mano" ("Hold My Hand" Spanish version)	Arif Cooper; Clayton Morrison	Supacoop	3:29
22.	"So Fine" (music video)			3:32

== Personnel ==
Adapted from the Imperial Blaze liner notes.

- Jimmy Douglass – mixing (2, 7, 10, 14, 16)
- Fabian Marasciullo – mixing (4, 5, 13, 17, 19)
- Gary Noble – mixing (8, 11, 12, 18, 20)
- Robert Orton – mixing (3, 4, 6, 9)
- Demacio Castellon – mixing (15)
- Rohan Dyer – mixing (18)
- Bryan Powell – assistant mixing (2, 7, 10, 14, 16)
- Marlon James – art
- Gerard Needham – photography
- Ivy Jarrin – styling
- Denise Chen – make up
- Sara James – Blaze icon concept

== Charts ==
Weekly chart performance for Imperial Blaze
Chart (2009)	Peak position
Austrian Albums (Ö3 Austria)	17
Belgian Albums (Ultratop Flanders)	31
Belgian Albums (Ultratop Wallonia)	11
Canadian Albums (Billboard)	5
Dutch Albums (Album Top 100)	36
French Albums (SNEP)	8
German Albums (Offizielle Top 100)	17
Italian Albums (FIMI)	77
Japanese Albums (Oricon)	10
Swiss Albums (Schweizer Hitparade)	4
UK Albums (Official Charts)	38
US Billboard 200	12
US Reggae Albums (Billboard)	1
US Top R&B/Hip-Hop Albums (Billboard)	3
US Top Rap Albums (Billboard)	1

== Certifications ==
Sales and certifications for Imperial Blaze
Region	Certification	Certified units/sales
France (SNEP)	Gold	50,000^{*}
^{*} Sales figures based on certification alone.
