= Press It Up =

Single by Sean Paul

from the album Imperial Blaze
- Released: 4 August 2009
- Recorded: 2009
- Genre: Dancehall; ragga; reggae fusion
- Length: 3:43
- Label: VP; Atlantic
- Songwriters: Sean Paul; Stephen "Di Genius" McGregor
- Producer: Stephen "Di Genius" McGregor

Sean Paul singles chronology
| "So Fine" (2009) | "Press It Up" (2009) | "Hold My Hand" (2009) |

"Press It Up" is the second single off reggae artist Sean Paul's album, Imperial Blaze. The track was premiered on 11 July 2009 on his official website.

== Music video ==
The video premiered on 9 September 2009. It was directed by Jessy Terrero.

== Charts ==
| Chart (2009) | Peak position |
|---|---|
| Canada (Canadian Hot 100) | 64 |
| France (SNEP) | 40 |
