= So Fine (Sean Paul song) =

2009 single by Sean Paul

Single by Sean Paul

from the album Imperial Blaze
- Released: 2 June 2009
- Genre: Dancehall; reggae-pop
- Length: 3:31
- Label: VP; Atlantic
- Songwriters: S. P. Henriques; S. McGregor; N. Staff
- Producer: Stephen "Di Genius" McGregor

Sean Paul singles chronology
| "Watch Dem Roll" (2007) | "So Fine" (2009) | "Press It Up" (2009) |

"So Fine" is a song by Jamaican artist Sean Paul. It was released as the lead single from his fourth album, Imperial Blaze. The track was premiered on 25 April 2009 on his official website. The official remix features Lomaticc & Sunny Brown in bhangra style.

== Background ==
In an interview with Blues & Soul, Sean Paul elaborated about the song's meaning.

‘So Fine’ is about me meeting a girl and just saying ‘You’re so fine. I’ll be there ANY time for you’.

== Music video ==
The video premiered on 24 June 2009. It was directed by Ray Kay in Miami.

== Charts ==
=== Weekly charts ===
| Chart (2009) | Peak position |
|---|---|
| Austria (Ö3 Austria Top 40) | 56 |
| Belgium (Ultratip Bubbling Under Flanders) | 19 |
| Belgium (Ultratip Bubbling Under Wallonia) | 4 |
| Europe (European Hot 100 Singles) | 25 |
| France (SNEP) | 17 |
| Germany (GfK) | 39 |
| Hungary (Rádiós TOP 100) | 34 |
| Japan Hot 100 (Billboard) | 70 |
| Slovakia Airplay (ČNS IFPI) | 81 |
| Sweden (Sverigetopplistan) | 36 |
| Switzerland (Schweizer Hitparade) | 38 |
| Turkey (Billboard) | 14 |
| UK Singles (Official Charts) | 25 |
| US Billboard Hot 100 | 50 |
| US Hot R&B/Hip-Hop Songs (Billboard) | 90 |
| US Hot Rap Songs (Billboard) | 13 |
| US Pop 100 (Billboard) | 87 |
| US Rhythmic (Billboard) | 18 |
| US Pop Airplay (Billboard) | 25 |

=== Year-end charts ===
| Chart (2009) | Position |
|---|---|
| Hungary (Rádiós TOP 100) | 150 |

== Certifications ==
| Region | Certification | Certified units/sales |
|---|---|---|
| Canada (Music Canada) | Gold | 40,000^{‡} |
^{‡} Sales+streaming figures based on certification alone.

== Release history ==
| Region | Date | Format | Ref. |
|---|---|---|---|
| North America | 2 June 2009 | Mainstream radio | |
| Various | 30 June 2009 | Digital download | |
| France | 13 July 2009 | Compact disc | |
| United Kingdom | 17 August 2009 | — | |
