= Di Genius =

Stephen "Di Genius" McGregor
- Born: Stephen McGregor
- Origin: Kingston, Jamaica
- Genres: Dancehall; reggae fusion; reggae; hip hop; R&B; urban contemporary
- Occupations: Record producer; singer; songwriter
- Years active: 1995–present
- Labels: Big Ship; Di Genius; Warner Chappell

Stephen McGregor, known professionally as Di Genius, is a Jamaican record producer, singer, and songwriter. Di Genius comes from a musical family—his father is legendary veteran reggae artist Freddie McGregor and his siblings, Daniel "Chino" McGregor and Yeshemabeth "Shema" McGregor, are also singers. While Di Genius was primarily known for producing riddims out of his "Big Ship" recording studio, he has gone on to produce and write songs for international artists such as Sean Paul, Drake, Nelly Furtado, Lianne La Havas, Shakira, John Legend among others. The New York Times named him a "Reggae Veteran At The Age of 18."

In 2017, Billboard.com listed Di Genius as one of the producers who brought dancehall back to the mainstream, noting his work on Drake's hit song "Controlla" off the multi-platinum selling album Views.

His work is also featured on multiple Grammy-nominated albums.

== Biography ==
Stephen McGregor is the son of legendary reggae singer Freddie McGregor. The year before, his father had passed up a record deal from Arista Records, choosing instead to create his own record label, which he named Big Ship after his 1982 hit single from the album of the same name. When he renovated the family home in 1995, Freddie McGregor had a small but high-tech recording studio built to produce music for the label, and Stephen took a shine to the studio at an early age. His father recalls of the period: "If we saw the door was open, we’d know Stephen was in there. He was just so short you couldn’t see him over the mixing desk." His father nurtured his interest in music by bringing him along on tour, and the young McGregor would often watch his father's performances from the side of the stage.

Stephen McGregor wrote and recorded his first song at the age of five, a dancehall track titled "School Done Rule" which was featured on the compilation "Reggae For Kids." However, the young McGregor soon gravitated more towards the production end of songwriting, and by the age of seven he had taught himself to play bass, guitar, keyboards, and violin by mimicking the songs he heard on the radio. McGregor began his production career at the age of twelve, contributing to local production studios such as Outlaw. His first hit riddim came in 2004, while still attending Ardenne High School. McGregor and his brother Chino approached dancehall artist Elephant Man at his nearby Havendale home to ask him to deejay on the whimsical "Cartoon" riddim, and the artist accepted, the first of fifteen artists to vocalize on the track. In a radio interview, a local DJ gave McGregor the nickname "Di Genius," as his musical talent came at such a young age.

What MTV described as Di Genius's "defining moment" came in 2006, when up-and-coming artist Mavado recorded the song "Weh Dem a Do" on his "Red Bull & Guinness" riddim. The riddim was co-produced with Delly Ranx the previous year, when Di Genius was fifteen years old. The single was a huge success in Jamaica and even made a mark internationally, placing on the Billboard Hot R&B/Hip-Hop Songs chart in the United States. The same year, he also released the successful "Power Cut" riddim and produced singles for several artists, including Bounty Killer, Da'Ville, and Big Ship labelmates Laden and Chino. He also began a project with Mavado's rival, the controversial deejay Vybz Kartel. The record The Teacher's Back was released two years later to a primarily Japanese market and featured eighteen original tracks, all produced by Di Genius.

In addition to his riddim productions and solo work, Di Genius also produced the entirety of his brother Chino's eponymous album in 2011 and the majority of Sean Paul's 2009 album Imperial Blaze and Mavado's Mr. Brooks...A Better Tomorrow, also from 2009. He also wrote and produced several songs for international artists, including Hasidic reggae artist Matisyahu, J-pop singer Mika Nakashima, R&B singers Ne-Yo and Estelle, Drake and pop star Nelly Furtado, whose Di Genius produced song "Don't Leave Me" appeared on her 2012 album The Spirit Indestructible.

In 2017, Billboard.com listed Di Genius as one of the producers who brought dancehall back to the mainstream, noting his work on Drake's hit song "Controlla" off the multi-platinum selling album Views.

In December 2019, Warner Chappell Music announced that they signed a new writing deal with Di Genius.

Production Style

Di Genius has said in interviews that he admires songwriters such as Stevie Wonder for his arrangements and instrumentation. He also stated that he draws inspiration from producers such as Timbaland and The Neptunes for their instantly recognizable production styles. Vivien Goldman described his productions in The New York Times as having "a challenging sound that combines playfulness, the spatial drama of a movie soundtrack and orchestral brio" characterized by "sparse, punching jabs of sound and lush snatches of melody." She also wrote that while his tense urban riddims are well suited for American hip hop audiences, he displays a great amount of versatility, with productions ranging from lovers rock to reggae fusion.

Equipment-wise, Di Genius stated that he started out producing with a single drum machine MPC, but has since moved on to multiple MPCs, keyboards, and a variety of audio editing programs, including Pro Tools, Reason, Logic Pro, and REAPER.

== Discography ==
As producer/composer/writer :

Mavado – "Weh Dem A Do" (Producer/Writer)

John Legend – "Bigger Love" (Producer)

Shenseea – "Run Run" (Writer/Producer)

Shenseea – "Hit & Run (Feat. Masicka & Di Genius)" (Writer/Producer/Performer)

TWICE – "This Is For" (Writer/Producer)

Ari Lennox – "Company(feat. Buju Banton)" (Writer/Producer)

Khea Julia Michaels Becky G – "Only One" ft Di Genius (Producer/Writer)

John Legend - "Don't Walk Away" ft Koffee (Producer/Writer)

John Legend – "I Want You To Know" (Producer/Writer)

John Legend – "Speak In Tongues" ft Jada Kingdom (Producer/Writer)

Raye - "Flip A Switch" (Producer/Writer)

Raye - "Flip A Switch Remix" ft Coi Leray (Producer/Writer)

Myke Towers – "Flow Jamaican" (Producer/Writer)

Myke Towers – "En Nadie" (Producer/Writer)

Becky G - "Rotate" ft Burna Boy (Producer/Writer)

Becky G - "My Man" (Producer/Writer)

Becky G - "Hablamos Mañana" (Producer/Writer)

Nelly Furtado – "Don't Leave Me (Producer/Writer)

French Montana - "Writing On The Wall" ft Post Malone Cardi B (Producer/Writer)

Rvssian - "IDKW" ft Shenseea Swae Lee Young Thug (Producer/Writer)

Paloma Mami - "RDMDA" (Producer/Writer)

Drake – "Controlla" (Producer/Writer)

Will.i.am – "it's my birthday" (Writer)

Shakira - "Amarillo" (Producer)

Shenseea - "Blessed" ft. Tyga (Producer/Writer)

Neyo Shenseea - "Major Moves" (from the movie "Sprinter") (Producer/Writer)

Teamarrr – "Cool Enough" (HBO Insecure) (Producer/Writer)

Damian Marley - Upholstery (Producer/Writer)

Damian Marley - Slave Mill (Producer/Writer)

Lianne La Havas – "Midnight" (Producer/Writer)

Lianne La Havas – "Fairytale" (Writer)

Sean Paul "Imperial Blaze" : "So Fine" (Producer/Writer)

"Lace it" (Producer/Writer)

"Press it up" (Producer/Writer)

"Now That i've got your love" (Producer/Writer)

"Birthday Suit" (Producer/Writer)

"Evening Ride" (Producer/Writer)

"Daddy's Home" (Producer/Writer)

" Don't Tease Me" (Producer/Writer)

"She Wanna Be Down" (Producer/Writer)

"Lately" (Producer/Writer)

"She Want Me" (Producer/Writer)

"Watch Dem Roll" (Producer/Writer)

Michael Franti – SoulRocker (Album) (Producer/Writer)

FuseODG – "Dangerous Love" (Producer/Writer)

Kalash – "Taken" (Producer/Writer)

Mali music – "One" (Producer/Writer)

Matisyahu – "Motivate"

Matisyahu – "Smash Lies"

Matisyahu – "Struggla"

Nicky Jam – "Me Enamoras" (Writer)

Wretch 32 – "Alright With Me" ft Anne Marie & prgrshn (Producer)

Maverick Sabre – Emotion (Producer/Writer)

Collie Buddz - " i got you" (Producer/Writer)

Collie Buddz - "Defend your own" (Producer/Writer)

Lali Esposito - Sin Querer Queriendo (feat. Mau y Ricky) (Producer/Writer)

Burna Boy - "Destiny" (Writer)

Paloma Mami - "RDMDA" (Producer/Writer)

=== Compilation albums ===
- Labwork Vol. 1 (2010)
- Labwork Vol. 2 (2010)
- Lab work Vol. 3

=== Riddims ===
==== 2000s ====
Year	Riddim
2004	Cartoon
2004	Dutch Master
2005	Red Bull & Guinness
2006	Breaking News
2006	Ghetto Whiskey
2006	Power Cut
2006	Smoke
2006	Stick Up
2007	After Dark
2007	Bee Hive
2007	Dark Again
2007	Darker Shadow
2007	12 Gauge
2007	Party Time
2007	Shadow
2007	Tremor
2007	2070s
2008	Advocate
2008	Chiney K
2008	Day Break
2008	Day Rave
2008	Forever
2008	Work Out
2009	Boasty
2009	Fitness
2009	Outbreak
2009	Summer Bounce
2009	Trippple Bounce

==== 2010s ====
Year	Riddim
2010	Bad People
2010	Catalog
2010	Championship
2010	Gun Show
2010	Street Swag
2010	Winnings
2011	Bad Acid
2011	Iron Belt
2011	Peppa
2011	Tenement Yard
2011	Wildlife
2012	Bassline
2012	Come Round
2012	Face Off
2012	Moving

== Awards and nominations ==
Year	Award	Category	Nominated work	Result	Ref.
2009	Grammy Award	Grammy Award for Best Reggae Album	Let's Get Physical (songwriter & producer)	Nominated	
2010	Grammy Award	Grammy Award for Best Reggae Album	Imperial Blaze (songwriter & producer)	Nominated	
2014	Grammy Award	Grammy Award for Best Urban Contemporary Album	Mali Is... (songwriter & producer)	Nominated	
2015	Grammy Award	Grammy Award for Best Urban Contemporary Album	Blood (Lianne La Havas album) (songwriter & producer)	Nominated	
2016	Grammy Award	Grammy Award for Best Rap Album	Views (songwriter & producer)	Nominated	
2016	Grammy Award	Grammy Award for Album Of The Year	Views (songwriter & producer)	Nominated	
2017	Grammy Award	Grammy Award for Best Reggae Album	Chronology (songwriter & producer)	Nominated	
2017	Grammy Award	Grammy Award for Best Latin Pop Album	El Dorado (songwriter & producer)	Won	
2017	Grammy Award	Grammy Award for Best Reggae Album	Stony Hill (songwriter & producer)	Won	
2017	ASCAP Awards	Best Rap Song	"Controlla" (songwriter & producer)	Won	
2017	Latin Grammy Award	Latin Grammy Award for Best Contemporary Pop Vocal Album	El Dorado (songwriter & producer)	Won	
2019	Grammy Award	Grammy Award for Best World Music Album	African Giant (songwriter)	Nominated	
2020	Grammy Award	Grammy Award for Best R&B Album	Bigger Love (songwriter & producer)	Won	
2021	Grammy Award	Grammy Award for Best Reggae Album	10 (songwriter & producer)	Nominated	
2022	Grammy Award	Grammy Award for Best Reggae Album	Scorcha (Sean Paul) (songwriter & producer)	Nominated	
