= Live n Livin =

Studio album by Sean Paul
- Released: 12 March 2021
- Studio: Dutty Rock; Tuff Gong
- Genre: Dancehall; reggae
- Length: 53:09
- Label: Dutty Rock
- Producer: Chimney; Dutty Rock; East Link; Gargamel; Keep Left; Misik; Money; One Time; Pure; Teetimus; Troyton; Tru Gift Ent

Sean Paul chronology
Mad Love the Prequel (2018)	Live n Livin (2021)	Scorcha (2022)

Singles from Live n Livin
- 1. "Buss a Bubble" Released: 12 September 2019; 2. "Lion Heart" Released: 20 October 2020; 3. "Guns of Navarone" Released: 18 December 2020; 4. "Real Steel" Released: 19 February 2021

Live n Livin is the seventh studio album by Jamaican dancehall musician Sean Paul, released on 12 March 2021 by his label Dutty Rock Productions. Recorded in Jamaica in various studios, It features collaborations with Assassin, Bugle, Buju Banton, Busy Signal, Chi Ching Ching, Damian Marley, Govana, Intence, Jesse Royal, Leftside, Looga Man, Masicka, Mavado, Mutabaruka, Ras Ajai, Serani, Skillibeng, Sotto Bless, Squash, Stonebwoy, and Suku Ward 21.

Live n Livin debuted at number 9 on the US Billboard Reggae Albums with 1,000 album equivalent units. The album would also receive a Grammy nomination for Best Reggae Album at the 64th Annual Grammy Awards.

== Singles ==
- The first single of the album "Buss a Bubble (Official Solo version)" was released on 12 September 2019. Its official music video was released on 25 October 2019. The album version is a remix featuring Chi Ching Ching, Ras Ajai, Looga Man & Sotto Bless.
- "Lion Heart" was released as a single in on 20 October 2020.
- The third single "Guns of Navarone" which features Jesse Royal and Mutabaruka was released on 18 December 2020. The album version is featuring Stonebwoy.
- "Real Streel" featuring Intence was released on 19 February 2021.

== Track listing ==
Live n Livin track listing
No.	Title	Writer(s)	Producer(s)	Length
1.	"Buss a Bubble – Remix" (featuring Chi Ching Ching, Looga Man, Ras Ajai & Sotto Bless)	Sean Paul Henriques; Ayun Daley; David Smiley; Delroy Foster; Idi Welsh; Radion Beckford; Raj S. Purandi	Pure Music; Dutty Rock Productions	3:09
2.	"Boom" (featuring Busy Signal)	S. Henriques; Reanno Gordon; Cleveland "Clevie" Brown; Jason Henriques; Nigel Staff; Nyann "News" Lodge; Shaun Anderson; Wycliffe "Steely" Johnson	Dutty Rock; Money Matters Entertainment	2:58
3.	"Space Ship" (featuring Suku Ward)	S. Henriques; J. Henriques; Andre Gray; Browne; Karen Christina Chin; Lodge; Anderson; Johnson	Dutty Rock; Money Matters	3:09
4.	"Real Steel" (featuring Intence)	S. Henriques; Brandon Shakespeare; Chevaughn Davis; Intence; Noel Maitland; Tawshawn Gabbidon	Dutty Rock; One Time Music	3:05
5.	"The Plug" (featuring Chi Ching Ching)	S. Henriques; Ching; David Hayle; Jordan Mcclure; Beckford	Chimnney Records; Dutty Rock	3:00
6.	"Dem Nuh Ready Yet" (featuring Leftside)	S. Henriques; Craig Parks	Dutty Rock; Keep Left Music	3:22
7.	"Crazy" (featuring Buju Banton)	S. Henriques; Andrew Marsh; Jermaine Reid; Mark Anthony Myrie; Lodge	Dutty Rock; Money Matters; Gargamel Music	3:00
8.	"Schedule" (featuring Chi Ching Ching & Damian Marley)	S. Henriques; A. Marsh; Ching; Marley; Lodge; Beckford	Dutty Rock; Money Matters	3:34
9.	"Money Bag" (featuring Govana)	S. Henriques; Govana; Romeo Nelson; Victan Edmund	Dutty Rock; Teetimus Music	3:33
10.	"Protect Me" (featuring Serani)	S. Henriques; Craig Marsh; Lodge	Dutty Rock	2:50
11.	"Lion Heart – Radio Edit"	S. Henriques; Earl Hood; Eric Goudy; Staff; Richard Butler Jr.	Dutty Rock	2:38
12.	"Guns of Navarone – Remix" (featuring Jesse Royal, Money Matters, Mutabaruka & Stonebwoy)	S. Henriques; A. Marsh; J. Henriques; Jessed David Leroi; Livingstone Satekla; Lodge; Anderson	Dutty Rock	3:58
13.	"Danger Zone" (featuring Bugle & Sotto Bless)	S. Henriques; Grey; welsh; Kobina Mathurin; Marlon Bennett; Roy Thompson	Misik Music; Dutty Rock	3:47
14.	"Life We Livin" (featuring Squash)	S. Henriques; Andrae Whittaker; A. Marsh; Lodge; Puranda	Dutty Rock; Money Matters; East Link Records	3:58
15.	"I'm Sanctify – Remix" (featuring Mavado, Agent Sasco (Assassin) & Troyton Music)	S. Henriques; David Brooks; Jeffrey Campbell; Okino Thomas; Troy Hinds	Troyton; Dutty Rock	3:30
16.	"Everest" (featuring Masicka & Skillibeng)	S. Henriques; Collin Edwards; Emwah Warmington; Javaun Fearon	Tru Gift Ent; Dutty Rock	3:30
Total length:				53:09

== Charts ==
Chart performance for Live n Livin
Chart (2021)	Peak position
US Reggae Albums (Billboard)	9
