= Crime in Jamaica =

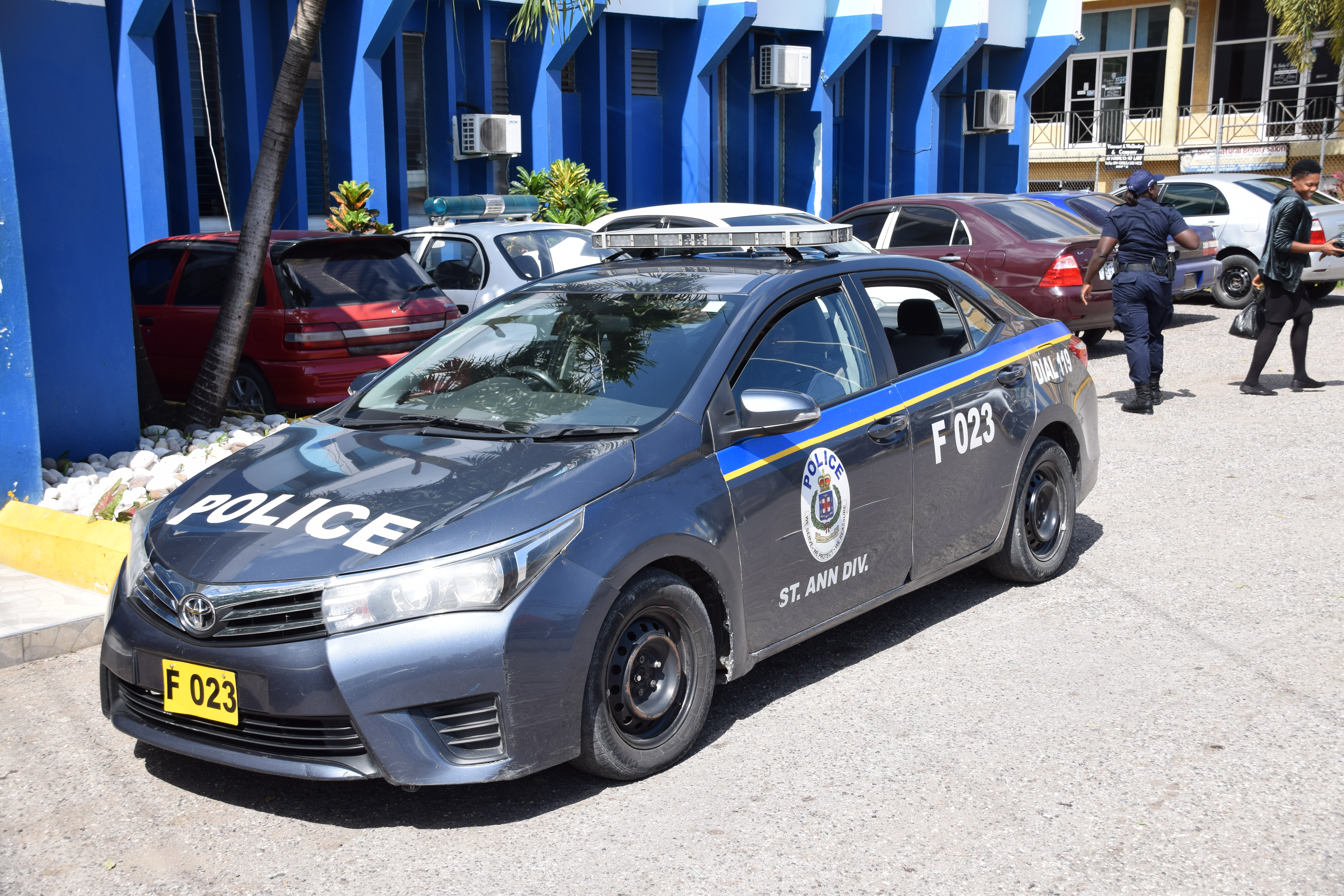
Police vehicle in the streets of Jamaica

Some areas of Jamaica, particularly population centers such as Kingston, Montego Bay and Spanish Town, experience high levels of crime and violence. Jamaica has had one of the highest intentional homicide rates in the world for many years, according to United Nations estimates. Former Prime Minister P. J. Patterson described the situation as "a national challenge of unprecedented proportions". In recent years, however, data has shown a marked decrease in homicides. In 2025, Jamaica recorded fewer than 700 murders for the first time in more than 30 years, reflecting a significant decline in the national homicide rate.

== Murder ==
Though having recently decreased rates of murder, with one of the lowest murder rates in the country within the 21st century, Jamaica still maintains one of the worst murder rates in the world. There have also been criticisms of the lack of police transparency in Jamaican policing, with calls for police body cameras as the number of police killings have increased significantly during the efforts to curb gang violence. On 22 July, Jamaican police announced they had killed 5 men in St. Andrew parish, Kingstown after having allegedly been under fire. InSight Crime has cited greater policing authority and investigatory abilities as the primary source of Jamaica's murder rate declining.

Much of the firearms in Jamaica are illegally trafficked from the United States, which are often brought into Jamaica by gang members or other unaffiliated criminals.

When Jamaica gained independence in 1962, the murder rate was 3.9 per 100,000 inhabitants, one of the lowest in the world. In 2022, Jamaica had 1,508 murders, for a murder rate of 53.34 per 100,000 people, the highest murder rate in the world.

Jamaica recorded 1,680 murders in 2009. In 2010, there were 1,428, in 2011, 1,125. 2012 saw 1,097, 2013, 1,200. 2014 totaled 1,192, 2015, 1,450, 2016, 1,350, 2017, 1,616 and 2018, 1,287. 1,508 murders were reported in 2022.

Year	Total rate per 100,000 people	Total intentional homicides
2009	61.82	1,683
2010	52.93	1,447
2011	41.26	1,133
2012	39.93	1,102
2013	43.34	1,202
2014	36.09	1,005
2015	43.26	1,209
2016	48.31	1,354
2017	58.65	1,647
2018	45.84	1,289
2019	47.62	1,340
2020	47.26	1,333
2021	52.13	1,474
2022	53.34	1,508
2023	49.05	1,393
2024	40.18	1,141
2025	23.7	673

== Drugs ==
In March 2025, Jamaican authorities seized 1,183 pounds (538.8 kg) of cocaine disguised as Cuban honey at the Kingston seaport. The drug, valued at JMD 3.1 billion (approximately 19.5 million USD) was found in a shipping container during a joint operation by the Jamaica Customs Agency and the Firearms and Narcotics Investigation Division (FNID). Senior Superintendent Samuel Blake highlighted the seizure as part of ongoing efforts to curb drug trafficking. The bust coincided with a visit by U.S. Secretary of State Marco Rubio, who discussed narcotics-related corruption with Jamaican officials.

== Emergencies ==
On November 15, 2022, Jamaican Prime Minister Andrew Holness declared a state of emergency for certain regions of Jamaica because of rising crime rates. Some areas affected by the measures include the capital Kingston, and the popular tourist destination of Montego Bay. This followed a travel warning from the U.S. State Department suggesting travelers to not travel to certain areas of the country due to crime rates.

== See also ==
- Jamaican posse
- The Harder They Come
- Yardies
