= Hold My Hand (Sean Paul song) =

Single by Sean Paul featuring Keri Hilson

from the album Imperial Blaze
- Released: 29 September 2009 (US radio)
- Recorded: 2009
- Genre: Dancehall; reggae fusion
- Length: 3:26 (album version)
- Label: VP; Atlantic
- Songwriters: Arif Cooper; Clayton Morrison
- Producer: Arif "Supacoop" Cooper

Sean Paul singles chronology
"Press It Up" (2009)	"Hold My Hand" (2009)	"Do You Remember" (2009)

Keri Hilson singles chronology
"Everything, Everyday, Everywhere" (2009)	"Hold My Hand" (2009)	"Medicine" (2009)

Music video
- "Sean Paul - Hold My Hand (Official Video)" on YouTube

"Hold My Hand" is the third single from reggae artist Sean Paul's album Imperial Blaze.

A Spanish version of the song called "Agarra mi mano" was released in Latin America to promote the album although the track is not included on it. The song received substantial airplay on Latin America radio. The Latin American version can, however, be found on iTunes. The iTunes version also has the song with lyrics by Keri Hilson included.

== Music video ==
The music video was released on 9 December 2009. It was directed by Little X, who had worked with Sean on six different videos before: "Gimme the Light", "Get Busy", "I'm Still In Love With You", "Temperature", "(When You Gonna) Give It Up To Me" and "Come Over". X was credited for exposing Paul to a wider audience via the video for the song, "Gimme the Light". That song was a hit along with "I’m Still In Love With You", also directed by Little X.

Keri Hilson does not appear in the video, nor are her lyrics included. Shay Mitchell plays the love interest.

The song was also performed on the late night show, Lopez Tonight hosted by George Lopez on TBS.

== Track listing ==
1. "Hold My Hand" iTunes version features Keri Hilson
2. Hold My Hand (Album Version)
3. Agarra Mi Mano (Spanish Version)
4. Hold My Hand (French Version), by Sean Paul (2010) features Zaho

== Charts ==
Chart (2009–2010)	Peak position
Belgium (Ultratip Bubbling Under Wallonia)	9
Canada (Canadian Hot 100)	82
France (SNEP)	3
Germany (GfK)	60
Portugal (AFP)	26
Slovakia Airplay (ČNS IFPI)	42
Switzerland (Schweizer Hitparade)	37
US Billboard Bubbling Under R&B/Hip-Hop Singles	10

== Release history ==
Region	Release date	Format
United States	29 September 2009	Airplay
Germany, Switzerland, Austria	12 February 2010	Digital download
Sweden, Norway	15 February 2010	Digital download
Luxembourg, Netherlands	19 February 2010	Digital download
Spain	2 March 2010	Digital download
