= Da'Ville =

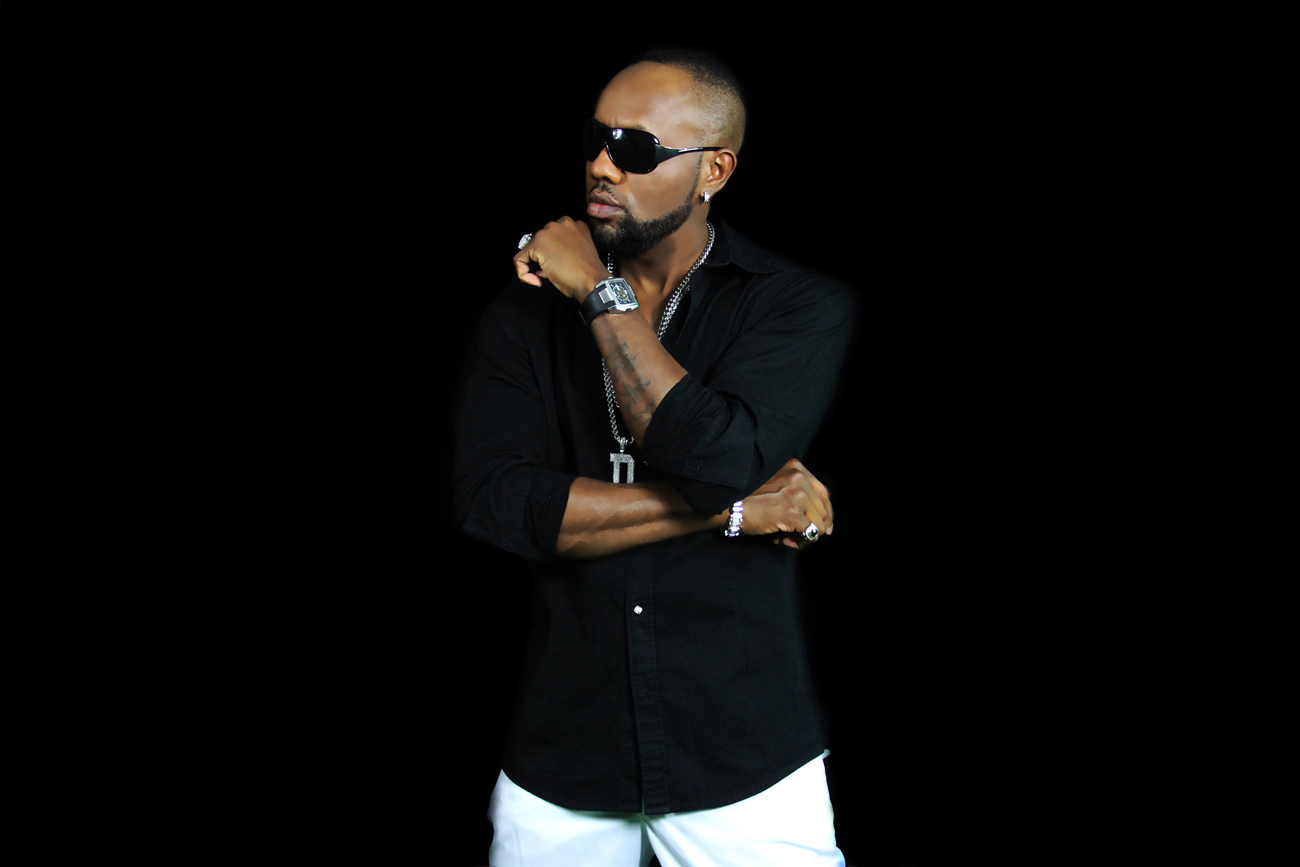

Background information
- Born: Orville Aloysious Thomas; 24 January 1976 (age 49)
- Origin: Kingston, Jamaica
- Genres: Reggae
- Occupation: singer
- Labels: Penthouse (2001–2004), Fashozy, VP
- Website: davilleofficial.com

Orville Aloysious Thomas (born 24 January 1976), better known by his stage name Da'Ville, is a Jamaican reggae singer.

== Biography ==
Orville Thomas is the first child of Jah Thomas and Cleopatra Wright. He was raised primarily by his grandmother Ms. Feama who instilled in him the principles of education and religion. She was a strict disciplinarian, who ensured that Da'Ville attended church and sang in the church choir. As a teenager, he continued to sing in the St. Peter Claver Church choir and performed in local school functions.

When successful groups emerged on the scene, Da'Ville became inspired to create a group of his own. After several unsuccessful attempts he continued to develop his craft until he graduated from high school. Upon graduation from Norman Manley Comprehensive High School, Da'Ville worked in a factory and as a store clerk. Shortly after, he was introduced to a newly formed group which later became ARP (A Raw Perspective).

After working with former group members of ARP, in 2001 he signed with Penthouse Records as a solo artist under the management of Donovan Germain. He recorded the hit singles "Cruzin", and "All My Life", the latter of which was recorded with then label mate, Marcia Griffiths. The single "All My Life" was nominated for the 2001 Reggae Soca Awards.

Da'Ville continued to record hit singles for producers such as: J.Brown, Fire Links, Stephen McGregor, Don Corleon, Preston Anfoy, Wee-Pow (Stone Love), Beres Hammond, Robert Livingston (Big Yard Music), and many more.

Aside from Da'Ville's vocal abilities, he is a songwriter, composer and producer. His early 2005 chart topping single "In Heaven", was produced by himself, O.Thomas and N.Palmer for Nap Musiq.

In January 2005 Da'Ville was introduced to Dj CurlyLocks of Federation Sound in Philadelphia. Together they started working on his breakout mix cd "A Moment With Da'Ville" which set the pace for Da'Ville's debut album In Heaven in 2005 produced and co-produced by O. Thomas, J. Brown and R.(Shams) Browne, for Fashozy Records, was released in Japan by Avex Entertainment Group. The album charted within the 2005 top ten best selling reggae albums for Japan Tower Records and led to numerous tours throughout Japan, Jamaica and the Caribbean Islands. As a result, in 2006, Avex released his second album Can't Get Over You, produced by O. Thomas and J. Brown for Fashozy Records. The albums included three successful singles – "In Heaven", produced by O. Thomas and N. Palmer for Nap Musiq, "Can't Get Over You", and "On My Mind", produced by O. Thomas and J. Brown for Fashozy Records.

In 2006, the singles "Can't Get Over You", "On My Mind", and "This Time I Promise" were all chart toppers. The single "Can't Get Over You", which was a top ten hit in Jamaica, was number one on the reggae chart in Aruba and number two in New York, and was included on the VP album 2006 Reggae Gold. "On My Mind", held the top position on several charts including Jamaica (5 weeks), New York (3 weeks), Florida, Europe and Africa. After a performance in New York City in early October, he was profiled in The New York Times. In December he was honoured with Stone Love's 'Singer of the Year' award 2006.

In Spring 2007, after an extensive European tour, Da'Ville made several appearances in North America. He performed at The Best of The Best Concert in Florida, the 26th International Reggae & World Music Awards held at the Apollo Theatre where he was nominated in several categories and won Most Improved Entertainer for 2006. In addition, Da'Ville made a special guest appearance at Madison Square Garden and he also performed at Irie Jamboree V before leaving for yet another Japan and Caribbean tour.

One of his biggest hit singles, "Always on My Mind", was remixed with dancehall artiste Sean Paul.

Da'Ville's latest album, Krazy Love, was released in May 2012, preceded by the mixtape Vitamin D.

Thomas became a born-again Christian and relocated to Florida. His first album in ten years is due to be released in 2022, with the first single taken from it, "Happy", released in February that year.

== Albums ==
- In Heaven (2005)
1. "Mamas Portrait"
2. "In Heaven"
3. "Gallis"
4. "Bring It On (Hey Baby)"
5. "These Wounds"
6. "Crazy"
7. "Weh She Want"
8. "Jump Off"
9. "Out of My Head"
10. "My Grade"
11. "Love Will Show Me the Way"
12. "All My Life"
13. "This Is the Feeling"
14. "She"
15. "One for Me"
16. "Chill"
- Can't Get Over You (2006)
1. "Intro"
2. "Have You Ever"
3. "On My Mind"
4. "Can't Get Over You"
5. "This Time I Promise"
6. "Crying Over You"
7. "Will You Be Mine?"
8. "Baby I Wish"
9. "Got To Love You More"
10. "Tell Me Again"
11. "Always By Your Side"
12. "Cruizin"
13. "Don't Say Goodnight"
14. "Smoking"
15. "No New Friends"
16. "Thuggist"
17. "Keep Holding On"
18. "In Heaven" (Accapella)
19. "In Heaven" (Version)
20. "Outro"
- On My Mind (2007)
1. "Always on My Mind" (Reprise) – Da'Ville, Sean Paul
2. "Can't Get Over You"
3. "All My Life" – Da'Ville, Marcia Griffiths
4. "I'm in Love with You"
5. "And So I Will Wait for You"
6. "This Time I Promise"
7. "Give Thanks for What You've Got"
8. "My Grade"
9. "Give It Up for My Baby"
10. "Yesterday"
11. "Have You Ever Been in Love?"
12. "My Heart"
13. "Dancehall Lovers Rock"
14. "Always on My Mind"
- Ichiban (2009)
1. "Ichiban" feat Fireball
2. "Hold Me Now"
3. "Missing You Right Now"
4. "Blessings A Multiply" feat DeMarco
5. "Never Gonna Cry"
6. "Perfect"
7. "As I Am"
8. "Gal You Gone"
9. "Forever" feat Shaggy
10. "Turning Me On"
11. "Eyes"
12. "Yesterday"
13. "Just Another Day" (The Voices)
14. "Away" (bonus track)
- Single Ready To Mingle (2011) Produced by Sherman de Vries & Scarecrow Beats
- Krazy Love (2012)
