= Christopher Martin (singer) =

Jamaican musical artist

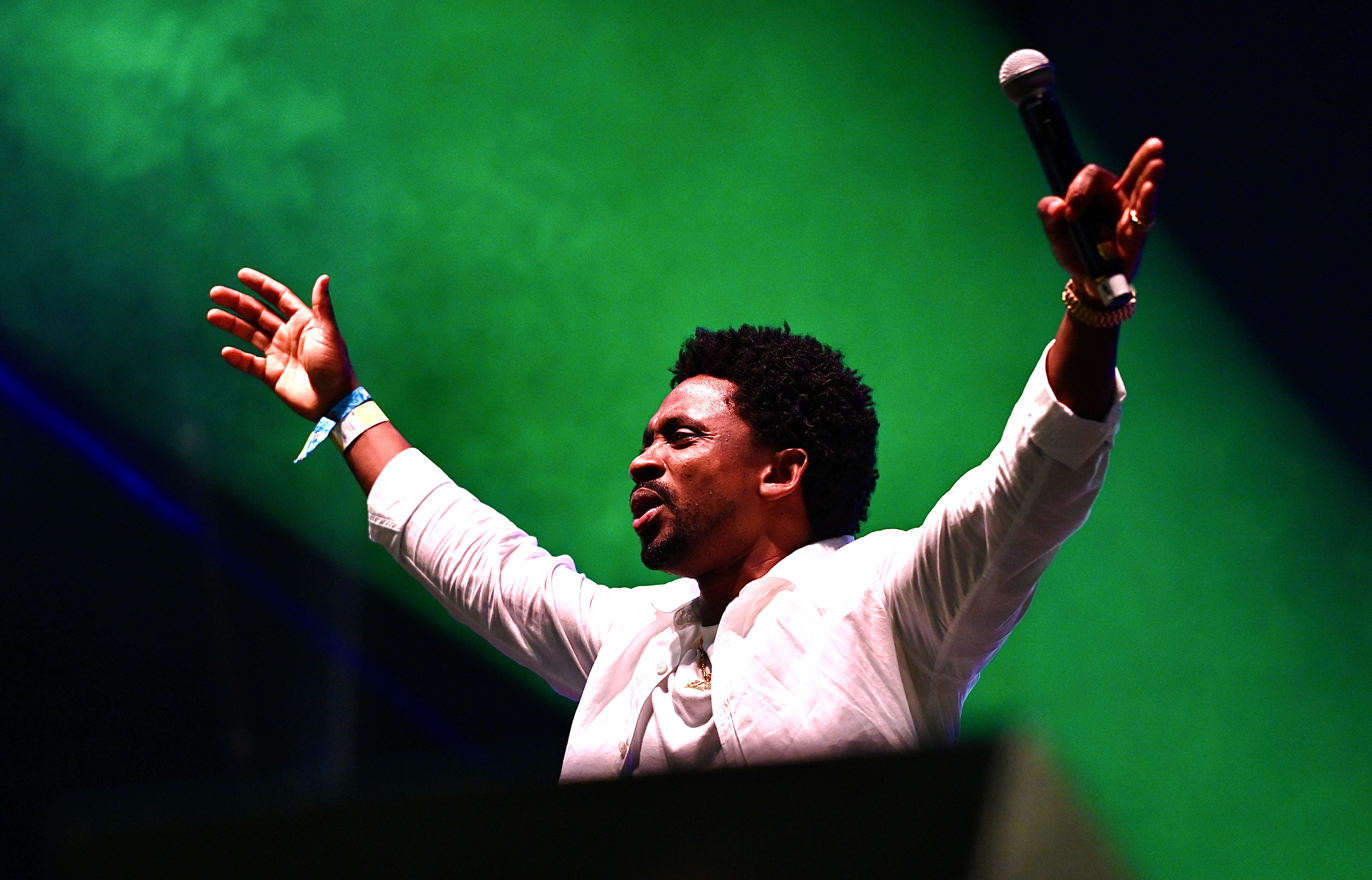
- Christopher Martin in concert at Reggae Geel 2022

Background information
- Also known as: Chris Martin
- Born: 14 February 1987 (age 39)
- Origin: St. Catherine, Jamaica
- Genres: Reggae, dancehall, reggae fusion
- Years active: 2005–present
- Label: VP Records

Christopher Oteng Martin (born 14 February 1987) is a reggae/dancehall singer and songwriter from St. Catherine, Jamaica. Martin won Digicel's Rising Stars in 2005 (the Jamaican version of American Idol). He is best known for the songs "Cheaters Prayer", "I'm a Big Deal", "Let Her Go", "Is It Love", and "Dreams of Brighter Days".

== Biography ==
Born in Back Pasture, St. Catherine, 14 February 1987, to Cleveland and Maxine Martin, Martin attended the Watermount All-Age School and later went on to St. Jago High School. There, he developed a love for dramatic arts and sports. He graduated in 2003.

Two years later, he won the Digicel Rising Stars title in 2005. After this, Martin participated in Digicel's 2005 Christmas promotion. After his debut single "Love Is All We Need," part of the promotional campaign, was released, he became the first Digicel Rising Stars Alumni to have a hit on the charts in Jamaica.

His releases include: "Nah Go Change", "Take My Wings", "Tonight", "Giving It", and the singles "Jamaican Girls" and "Gallis" featuring Busy Signal. He has worked with a number of top producers in reggae and dancehall including Robert Livingston (Big Yard), Arif Cooper, Shane Brown(Jukeboxx) and Christopher Birch.

Martin has performed numerous stage shows across Jamaica and was notably invited to perform at One Night with Michael Bolton and at the 2008 Air Jamaica Jazz Festival. In 2008, Martin was nominated for The Jamaica Observer Teenage Choice Awards and Excellence in Music and Entertainment. The song "Melody to My Song" was released on Good Love Rhythm, produced by Baby G. The song "She Never Listens" featuring Demarco was produced by Star Kutt, and "Watch Me Lord" was produced by Ariff Cooper and released on the Fresh Ear label. In addition to those, Martin appeared on "Vibe Is Right" on the Street Bullies Medley produced by Tony Kelly as well as "Real Friends" featuring Agent Sassco (formerly Assassin) and D-Major, released via T.J Records.

In 2013, Martin signed to VP Records. In April 2016, he toured Zimbabwe and performed live on stage alongside D'Major and several Zimbabwean singers, including Winky D. This show took place at Glamis Arena in Harare.

== Personal life ==
Martin was romantically linked with Ce' cile from 2010 to 2014 and they are the parents of a daughter, Christiyana, born in 2012.

== Discography ==
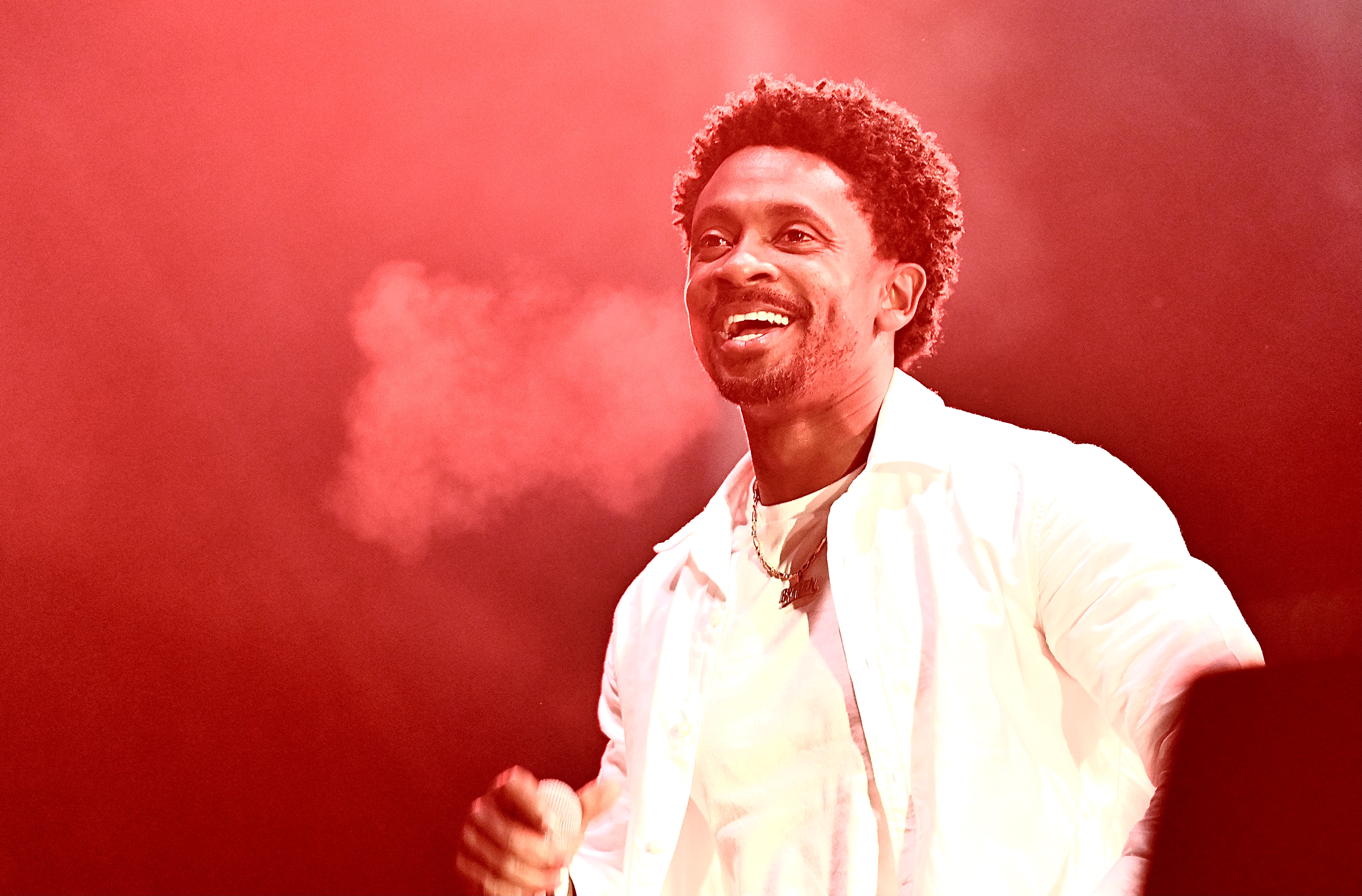
Christopher Martin in concert at Reggae Geel 2022

=== Albums ===
- Big Deal (2017)
- And Then (2019)

=== Extended Playlist (EP) ===
- Steppin Razaor (2015)
