= Sean Paul =

Jamaican rapper (born 1973)

Sean Paul OD
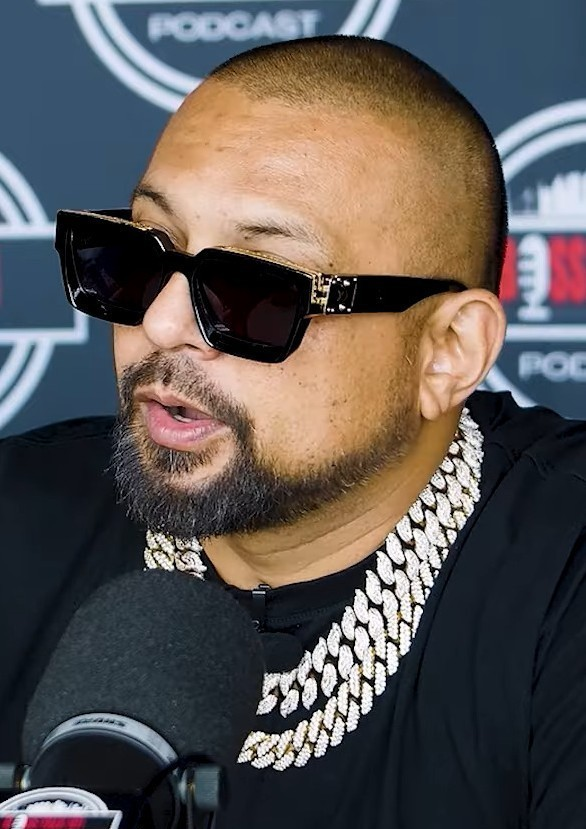
- Paul in 2024

Background information
- Born: Sean Paul Ryan Francis Henriques; 9 January 1973 (age 53); Kingston, Jamaica
- Genres: Dancehall; reggae; hip-hop; R&B
- Occupations: Rapper; singer; songwriter
- Years active: 1994–present
- Labels: VP; Atlantic; Dutty Rock; Island
- Spouse: Jodi Stewart (m. 2012)
- Website: allseanpaul.com
- Children: 2

Sean Paul Ryan Francis Henriques OD (born 9 January 1973) is a Jamaican rapper, singer, and songwriter. His first album, Stage One, was released in 2000. He gained international fame with his second album, Dutty Rock, in 2002. Its single "Get Busy" topped the US Billboard Hot 100 chart in the United States, as did "Temperature", off his third album, The Trinity (2005).

Paul frequently invokes the nickname "Chanderpaul", originating from the similarity between his first two names and cricketer Shivnarine Chanderpaul. In the Vice documentary The Story of 'Get Busy' by Sean Paul, when asked "How did you become 'Sean Da Paul'", Paul recalls how others would call him Chan-der-paul, and the name stuck. He then started saying it in shows and recordings.

Most of his albums have been nominated for Grammy Awards for Best Reggae Album, with Dutty Rock winning the award. Paul has been featured in many other singles, including chart-toppers "Baby Boy" by Beyoncé, "Breathe" by Blu Cantrell, "What About Us" by The Saturdays, "Rockabye" by Clean Bandit, "Cheap Thrills" by Sia, and "Fuego" by DJ Snake. "Cheap Thrills" and "Rockabye", along with Paul's own "No Lie" (2016), each have over 1 billion views on YouTube, with "Rockabye" having reached over 2.7 billion views.

== Early life ==
Sean Paul Ryan Francis Henriques was born in Kingston, Jamaica, on 9 January 1973. His mother Frances, a painter, is of English and Chinese Jamaican descent. His paternal great-grandfather's family, Sephardic Jews from Portugal, emigrated to Jamaica in the 17th century. Paul's father also has Afro-Jamaican ancestry. Paul's father, Garth Henriques, was believed to be descended from Portuguese horse thieves who were fleeing from bounty hunters in a ship that sank in Jamaica.

Paul was raised as a Catholic, although he also attended the Jewish private school Hillel Academy in Jamaica. Several members of his family are swimmers. His grandfather was on the first Jamaican men's national water polo team. His father also played water polo for the team in the 1960s, and competed in long-distance swimming, while Paul's mother was a butterfly swimmer. When Paul was 15, his father was arrested on charges of manslaughter and sentenced to 15 years in prison; he was released for good behaviour when Paul was 19.

Paul played for the national water polo team from the age of 13 to 21, when he gave up the sport in order to launch his musical career. He attended Wolmer's Boys' School and the College of Arts, Science, and Technology, now known as the University of Technology, where he was trained in commerce with an aim of pursuing an occupation in swimming. In 1992, Paul worked as a bank teller and enrolled in a hotel-management program, learning the basics of French cuisine.

== Career ==
=== 1994–2000: Early beginnings and rise to fame ===
In 1994, Paul appeared in Carrot Jetter's music video "Nice Time".

Zachary Harding told his brother, Jeremy, about a singer that he had heard perform live at a small open mic event in Kingston, who sounded a lot like dancehall deejay and toaster Super Cat. Jeremy eventually met the singer when Paul came by his studio to ask for some advice. During the meeting, Paul recorded a vocal over Harding's rhythm track and in the process created the song "Baby Girl". Jeremy subsequently became Paul's manager and producer.

Paul began hanging out at the studio every day, and the pair collaborated on several more tracks. When they recorded "Infiltrate" they decided they had something good enough to get on the radio. As Paul started to attract local attention, Harding began looking after his affairs. He later told HitQuarters that his support of Paul's fledgling career initially led him assuming the roles of "DJ, manager, road manager, and security-guard".

Paul made a cameo appearance in the 1998 film Belly on stage performing. He made a successful collaboration with DMX and Mr. Vegas, "Top Shotter", to the soundtrack of the film.

In 2000, Paul released his debut album, Stage One with VP Records. In the same year, Paul collaborated with Canadian rapper Kardinal Offishall and singer July Black on the song "Money Jane" from Offishall's album Quest for Fire: Firestater, Vol. 1.

=== 2001–2015: Atlantic Records deal and international success ===
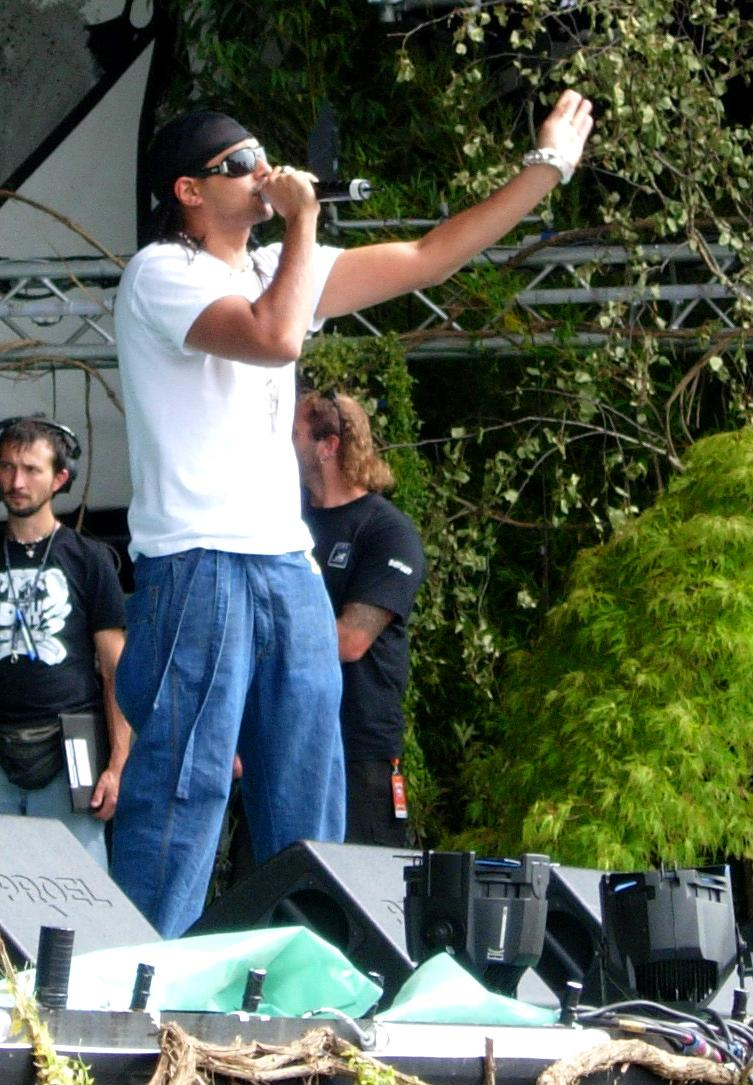
Paul performing in 2005

In 2001, Paul continued his work with manager and producer Jeremy Harding, Paul released a single "Gimme the Light" after writing and recording his lyrics to the "Buzz" riddim, the single turned out to be a nationwide success in Jamaica and eventually became a worldwide smash hit in 2002, ultimately reaching number 7 on the Billboard Hot 100, the early crossover momentum of the single would help Paul secure a record deal with Atlantic Records in a joint venture deal with his label VP Records, the single would then appear on his second studio album, Dutty Rock which was released in November 2002. All of its latter hit singles would also receive airplay and rotation on MTV and BET.

In early 2003, the second single "Get Busy" was released and would end up topping the Billboard Hot 100 months later, making it Paul's first number-one hit, it was also the first ever dancehall song to top the chart. Dutty Rock became a worldwide commercial success, peaking in the top ten on the Billboard 200, was certified double-platinum by the Recording Industry Association of America (RIAA) and eventually selling over six million copies worldwide. Dutty Rock won the Best Reggae Album at the 46th Annual Grammy Awards in 2004. "Get Busy" was also nominated for Best Male Rap Solo Performance in that year. Simultaneously, Paul was featured on Beyoncé's U.S. number-one hit song "Baby Boy", and also Blu Cantrell's "Breathe" which did not perform well in the United States but was a massive hit in Europe. This album not only further popularized dancehall music in the 2000s, but also helped developed and popularized the genre of dancehall pop.

Paul's third album The Trinity was released on 27 September 2005. The album debuted at number 5 on the Billboard 200, breaking records with its first-week sales for a reggae/dancehall artist, eventually going Platinum in the United States and selling 4 million copies worldwide. The album produced five big hits, "We Be Burnin'", Ever Blazin'", "(When You Gonna) Give It Up to Me" (featuring Keyshia Cole), "Never Gonna Be the Same", and the U.S. chart-topping smash hit "Temperature", making it his third number-one hit on the Billboard Hot 100 with "Temperature" becoming one of his signature hits. The video of "(When You Gonna) Give It Up to Me" was featured in the film Step Up in 2006. He was nominated for four awards at the 2006 Billboard Music Awards, including Male Artist of the Year, Rap Artist of the Year, Hot 100 Single of the Year, and Pop 100 Single of the Year for "Temperature". He also won an American Music Award for "(When You Gonna) Give It Up to Me", beating Kanye West and Nick Lachey, who were also nominated for the award. "Send It On" from The Trinity featured on the 2005 Vauxhall Corsa advert. Paul often contributes his songs to various Riddim Driven albums by VP Records. In March 2007, he returned to Jamaica to perform at the 2007 Cricket World Cup opening ceremony.

Paul appears in the video game Def Jam: Fight for NY as part of Snoop Dogg's crew and again in the game's sequel, Def Jam: Icon.

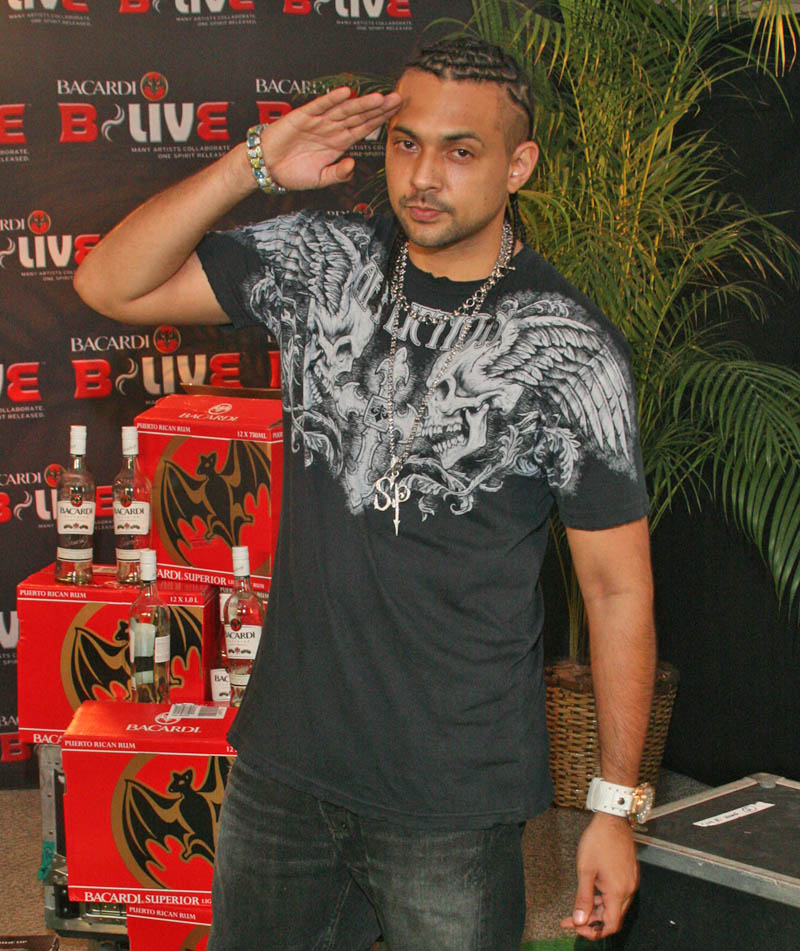
Paul in 2007

Paul's fourth album Imperial Blaze was released on 18 August 2009. The lead single, "So Fine", which was produced by Stephen "Di Genius" McGregor, premiered on Paul's website on 25 April 2009.

The album consists of 20 tracks including "So Fine", "Press It Up", "She Want Me", and "Private Party", which are party tracks, and also love songs such as "Hold My Hand" (featuring Keri Hilson), "Lately", and "Now That I've Got Your Love", among others. Producers on the album include Don Corleone, Jeremy Harding, and Paul's brother Jason "Jigzagula" Henriques. All the songs of the album were added to Paul's Myspace page on the day of release of the album.

The album spawned eight music videos: "Always On My Mind" with Da'Ville, "Give It to You" with Eve, "Watch Dem Roll", "Back It Up" with Leftside, "Push It Baby" with Pretty Ricky, "Hit 'Em" with Fahrenheit and his brother Jason "Jigzagula" Henriques, "Come Over" with Estelle, and also the video of his first single, "So Fine".

Paul appeared in Shaggy's video, "Save a Life", which also includes appearances from Elephant Man and Da'Ville, among others. In an effort to raise money for a children's hospital, Shaggy, Paul, and others had a benefit concert. All proceeds went towards getting new equipment and technology 'For Aid to the Bustamante Hospital for Children'. During the premiere for M-Net's Big Brother Africa: All-Stars on 18 July 2010, he performed his songs "Temperature", "Hold My Hand", and "So Fine".

Paul's fifth album Tomahawk Technique was released on 24 January 2012. The first single, "Got 2 Luv U", features vocals from American singer Alexis Jordan. The song was written by Paul, Ryan Tedder, and Stargate, who also produced the song.

"She Doesn't Mind" is the second single from the album. It was written by Paul, Shellback, and Benny Blanco and was also produced by Shellback and Blanco. It was released on 29 September 2011 on French radio stations NRJ and Skyrock, and to iTunes on 31 October. Like its predecessor, "Got 2 Luv U", it topped the charts in Switzerland, but it debuted at that spot. Paul appeared on the Never Mind the Buzzcocks episode, which aired on 21 November 2011.

Tomahawk Technique was released on 18 September 2012 in the U.S. The album was nominated for the Best Reggae Album at the 55th Annual Grammy Awards.

In 2011, Paul released his first riddim called "Blaze Fia Riddim" under Dutty Rock Productions, his own label.

In 2012, Paul was asked to team up with Congorock and Stereo Massive to feature vocals on their song "Bless Di Nation".

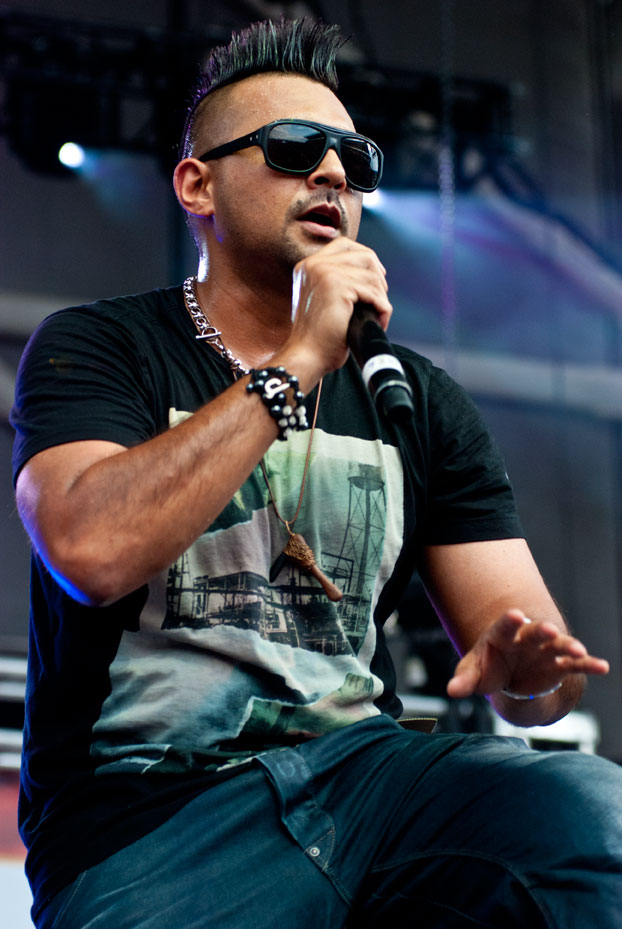
Paul in June 2012

During 2013, Paul worked on his sixth studio album Full Frequency, which was released on 18 February 2014. The first single on the album, "Other Side of Love", was released to iTunes on 10 June 2013. The second single, "Entertainment 2.0", which features 2 Chainz and Juicy J, was released on 25 June 2013. Paul released the official remix to the song on 3 September 2013 with an additional feature from Nicki Minaj. "Turn It Up" was released as a single in the UK on 20 October 2013. It was to be released in Germany on 22 November 2013. "Want Dem All" was released as a single in the U.S. on 5 November 2013. The album features guest appearances from Damian Marley, Iggy Azalea, Brick & Lace, Konshens, Nicki Minaj, 2 Chainz, and Juicy J. Also in 2013, Paul was featured on the single "What About Us" by British girl group The Saturdays. The single went straight to the top of the Official UK Charts with over 100,000 sales in its first week, becoming the fastest selling single of the year at the time of release.

In January 2014, Paul was the main international artist at Fiestas Palmares 2014 in Costa Rica. Also in 2014, Paul was featured on the official English-language version of long-running Latin American chart-topper "Bailando" by Enrique Iglesias featuring Gente de Zona and Descemer Bueno. The video for the English version was shot concurrently with the video for the Spanish version in Santo Domingo in the Dominican Republic. The English version reached top 10 status in the United States and topping the charts of several other countries.

Paul appeared on the EP Apocalypse Soon by electronic music group Major Lazer, on the track "Come On to Me", which was released as the second single from the album, after "Aerosol Can", a collaboration with Pharrell Williams. He also collaborated with Nigerian singer Timaya on a remix of his song "Bum Bum". An accompanying video, directed by Shutah Films, was released online on 11 April. On 6 July 2015, Paul released the music video for his song "Take It Low" on the album Full Frequency.

=== 2016–2018: New label and commercial resurgence ===
Paul had already become an independent artist after parting ways with Atlantic Records in September 2014. Under new management of Jules Dougall of Dougall Group and Steve "Urchin" Wilson, Paul enjoyed a commercial resurgence in his career throughout 2016 after being featured on Australian singer Sia's remix version of her song "Cheap Thrills", it topped the Billboard Hot 100, making it Paul's first number-one hit on the chart since 2006. The song was also a global success, reaching number one in more than 15 other countries. It reportedly ended up becoming the most Shazamed song of 2016.

Following this resurgence, Paul signed a new record deal with Island Records in July 2016.

In October 2016, British electronic group Clean Bandit released the song "Rockabye", which features vocals from Paul and Anne-Marie. It peaked at number 9 on the Billboard Hot 100 in the United States, spent nine consecutive weeks at number 1 on the UK Singles Chart, and gained the coveted Christmas number 1. The song was a massive global hit in 2017, reaching number 1 in 18 other countries.

In November 2016, Paul cited Toots and the Maytals as inspiration when it comes to his own personal career longevity by saying, "I've seen some great people in my industry, you know, people like Toots... He's up there in years and he's doing it."

On 18 November 2016, he released a new single "No Lie" (featuring Dua Lipa), which served as the lead single from his EP Mad Love the Prequel, which would be released in 2018, making it his first project release with Island Records. The song would eventually become a global phenomenon over the following six years after its release, it became a top-ten hit in 10 different countries and would end up becoming his most streamed song across streaming platforms, the music video, directed by Tim Nackashi, also surpassed 1 billion views on YouTube in April 2022, making it his most popular music video.

One of the few other singles off the EP, "Mad Love", a collaboration with David Guetta, which features singer Becky G, would also make a global impact on the charts, peaking within the top 50 in multiple continents.

In 2018, Paul featured in a bilingual remix of CNCO's song "Hey DJ", alongside American singer-songwriter Meghan Trainor, which was released on November 9, 2018, by Sony Music Latin.

=== 2019–present: Crossover to Latin music market and latest projects ===
In March 2019, Paul collaborated with Colombian singer J Balvin on a bilingual song called "Contra La Pared", the song peaked within the top 15 of the Billboard Hot Latin Songs chart, making it his seventh entry on the chart. It was also a major hit in Spain, peaking in the top 10 on the nation's chart and was a top 30 hit in both Colombia and Argentina.

Paul had suggested that Jamaican musicians making use of "hardcore patois", a mixture of English with several languages spoken in Jamaica, create a language barrier that prevents them from becoming successful in the United States and the United Kingdom.

It was announced that he would receive the Order of Distinction (OD) from the Jamaican government on 21 October 2019, "for contribution to the global popularity and promotion of reggae music".

In August 2019, Paul was nominated alongside Drake, DJ Snake, and Snow for the Favorite Crossover Artist category at the 2019 Latin American Music Awards.

In March 2021, Paul released his seventh studio album called Live n Livin under his own label Dutty Rock Productions.

Paul collaborated with fellow Jamaican artists Spice and Shaggy for a dancehall single called "Go Down Deh". They performed the song live on Good Morning America, Jimmy Kimmel Live!, and The Wendy Williams Show. The song was massively well-received worldwide on the internet and was named the "dancehall track of the year" for 2021 by NPR.

In May 2022, Paul released his eighth studio album Scorcha through Island Records.

In September 2022, Paul appeared in season 22 of The Voice as Gwen Stefani's coach advisor.

In April 2023, Paul collaborated on another bilingual song called "Niña Bonita" with Colombian singer Feid, the single peaked within the top 50 of the Hot Latin Songs making it his ninth entry on the chart, it has also become a top-10 hit in both Colombia and Ecuador and a top-20 hit in Peru, Spain and Chile.

In October 2023, Paul received a nomination for Crossover Artist of the Year at the 2023 Billboard Latin Music Awards.

In July 2026, Sean Paul received two Platinum certifications from the British Phonographic Industry (BPI) for the singles "Got 2 Luv U" featuring Alexis Jordan and "Do You Remember" by Jay Sean featuring Sean Paul and Lil Jon, recognizing each for exceeding 600,000 combined sales and streams in the United Kingdom. "Got 2 Luv U", released in 2011 as the lead single from Tomahawk Technique, peaked at number 11 on the UK Singles Chart and achieved commercial success across Europe.

== Business ventures ==
In 2011, Paul established his own record label, Dutty Rock Productions, along with his production team. In 2017, Paul signed Jamaican artist Chi Ching Ching to the label, making it the label's first signing. In 2022, in promotion of his eighth studio album Scorcha, he released his own brand of Jamaican patties called the "Scorcha Patty" along with its hot sauce in partnership with a United Kingdom-based Jamaican restaurant called Port Royal, which was made available for a limited time.

== Philanthropy ==
In 2016, Paul donated $1 million JMD toward Bustamante Hospital for Children. During the COVID-19 pandemic, Paul founded the "Sean Paul Foundation" in 2020, aiding less-fortunate communities in Jamaica with donations of groceries to poor families and distribution of tablet computers to primary schools for students. In November 2025, Paul partnered with Food For The Poor Jamaica and pledged to match $50,000 USD in donations towards emergency relief for communities affected by Hurricane Melissa in Jamaica. In December 2025, Paul co-headlined a benefit concert to fundraise money for Hurricane Melissa relief efforts.

== Activism ==
Paul has spoken out about climate change. In 2015, he attended the United Nations Climate Change conference, expressing concerns over pollution, the coastal erosions of beaches in Jamaica and has said that athletes in the country are having to "run in smog". He has advocated for waste reduction, solar power and the use of electric cars. He collaborated with Paul McCartney, Natasha Bedingfield, Bon Jovi, Colbie Caillat, and various other artists on a single called "Love Song to the Earth" to spread awareness about climate change. In 2018, Paul was named an ambassador for climate change in the Caribbean. In 2022, Paul stated in his efforts to help combat climate change; "I have made the move to make my whole house solar powered. From the water to all the lights, and it runs my studio as well".

== Personal life ==
As a teenager he dated Nicole Wynter, who died from a brain tumour at age 17. She is mentioned in the singer's song "Never Gonna Be The Same" and a photo of her was shown in the music video.

In 2012, Paul married Jamaican television host Jodi Stewart. In August 2016, it was announced that the couple was expecting their first child. On 26 February 2017, Paul announced the birth of their son. Their second child was born on 20 August 2019.

== Discography ==
- Stage One (2000)
- Dutty Rock (2002)
- The Trinity (2005)
- Imperial Blaze (2009)
- Tomahawk Technique (2012)
- Full Frequency (2014)
- Live n Livin (2021)
- Scorcha (2022)

== Filmography ==
Film

Year	Title	Role	Notes
1998	Belly	Himself	Uncredited

Television

Year	Title	Role
2003	Late Night with Conan O'Brien	Musical guest
2003	Saturday Night Live	Musical guest
2003	Players	Himself, musical guest
2003, 2005	Later... With Jools Holland	Himself, musical guest
2003, 2006, 2013	The Tonight Show with Jay Leno	Musical guest
2003, 2005	Showtime at the Apollo	Himself, musical guest
2004	Rove	Himself, musical guest
2004	Good Morning Australia	Himself, musical guest
2005	Punk'd	Himself
2005	TV total	Himself, musical guest
2005, 2006	Last Call with Carson Daly	Himself, musical guest
2005, 2020–2022	Jimmy Kimmel Live!	Musical guest
2006	Live with Kelly and Mark	Himself, musical guest
2006	Popworld	Himself, musical guest
2006, 2019	Wild 'n Out	Himself, musical guest
2009	So You Think You Can Dance	Musical guest
2009	The Mo'Nique Show	Himself, musical guest
2009	Lopez Tonight	Himself, musical guest
2009, 2011, 2021	The Wendy Williams Show	Himself, musical guest
2011	Never Mind the Buzzcocks	Himself
2012	Big Morning Buzz Live	Himself, musical guest
2018, 2021	Good Morning America	Musical guest
2020	Access Hollywood	Himself
2022	Tamron Hall	Himself, musical guest
2022	The Voice	Himself, coach advisor
2022	Loose Women	Himself, musical guest
2022	The Lateish Show with Mo Gilligan	Himself, musical guest

Documentary

Year	Title	Role
2013	Music for Mandela	Himself
2022	African Redemption: The Life and Legacy of Marcus Garvey	Himself
2023	Bad Like Brooklyn Dancehall	Himself

Video games

Year	Title	Role	Notes
2004	Def Jam: Fight for NY	Himself	Voice and likeness
2006	Def Jam Fight for NY: The Takeover	Himself	Voice and likeness
2007	Def Jam: Icon	Himself	Voice and likeness

== Awards and nominations ==
=== Grammy Awards ===
Year	Nominee / work	Award	Result	Ref.
2004	Himself	Best New Artist	Nominated	
2004	"Get Busy"	Best Male Rap Solo Performance	Nominated	
2004	Dutty Rock	Best Reggae Album	Won	
2006	The Trinity	Best Reggae Album	Nominated	
2010	Imperial Blaze	Best Reggae Album	Nominated	
2012	Tomahawk Technique	Best Reggae Album	Nominated	
2015	Full Frequency	Best Reggae Album	Nominated	
2017	"Cheap Thrills" (with Sia)	Best Pop Duo/Group Performance	Nominated	
2022	Live n Livin	Best Reggae Album	Nominated	
2023	Scorcha	Best Reggae Album	Nominated	

=== Other awards ===
Year	Organisation	Award	Result
2003	American Music Awards	Favorite Rap/Hip-Hop Male Artist	Nominated
2003	American Music Awards	Favorite Rap/Hip-Hop Album (Dutty Rock)	Nominated
2003	BET Awards	Best New Artist	Nominated
2003	MTV Video Music Awards	Best Dance Video ("Get Busy")	Nominated
2003	MTV Video Music Awards	Best New Artist in a Video ("Get Busy")	Nominated
2003	MuchMusic Video Awards	Best International Video ("Gimme the Light")	Won
2003	MTV Europe Music Awards	Best New Act	Won
2003	Source Awards	Dancehall Reggae Album of the Year (Dutty Rock)	Won
2004	International Reggae and World Music Awards	Entertainer of the Year	Won
2004	MTV Video Music Awards	Best Choreography in a Video ("Like Glue")	Nominated
2005	MOBO Awards	Best Reggae Act	Nominated
2005	International Reggae and World Music Awards	Entertainer of the Year (shared with Wyclef Jean, Malachi Smith, and Beenie Man)	Won
2005	ASCAP Rhythm & Soul Music Awards	Top Reggae Artist of the Year	Won
2006	American Music Awards	Favorite Pop/Rock Male Artist	Won
2006	MOBO Awards	Best Reggae Act	Won
2006	MTV Video Music Awards	Best Dance Video ("Temperature")	Nominated
2006	MTV Video Music Awards	Best Choreography in a Video ("Temperature")	Nominated
2006	MTV Video Music Awards Japan	Best Reggae Video ("We Be Burnin'")	Nominated
2006	MuchMusic Video Awards	Best International Artist Video ("Temperature")	Nominated
2006	World Music Awards	World's Best Selling Rap/Hip-Hop Artist	Nominated
2006	Billboard Music Awards	Male Artist of the Year	Nominated
2006	Billboard Music Awards	Hot 100 Single of the Year ("Temperature")	Nominated
2006	Billboard Music Awards	Pop 100 Single of the Year ("Temperature")	Nominated
2006	Billboard Music Awards	Rap Artist of the Year	Nominated
2006	MTV Europe Music Awards	Best Male	Nominated
2006	MTV Europe Music Awards	Best Hip-Hop	Nominated
2007	NRJ Music Awards	International Male Artist of the Year	Nominated
2007	Nickelodeon Kids' Choice Awards	Favorite Male Singer	Nominated
2007	MTV Video Music Awards Japan	Best Reggae Video ("Temperature")	Nominated
2007	Soul Train Music Awards	Best Dance Cut ("(When You Gonna) Give It Up to Me")	Nominated
2007	ASCAP Rhythm & Soul Music Awards	Reggae Artist of the Year	Won
2007	MTV Romania Music Awards	Best International Artist	Won
2009	MOBO Awards	Best Reggae Act	Won
2009	Soul Train Music Awards	Best Reggae Artist	Won
2010	MTV Video Music Awards Japan	Best Reggae Video ("So Fine")	Nominated
2012	NRJ Music Awards	Best International Male Artist of the Year	Nominated
2012	MTV Europe Music Awards	Best World Stage Performance	Nominated
2012	Soul Train Music Awards	Best Caribbean Performance	Won
2012	MTV Video Music Awards Japan	Best Reggae Video ("She Doesn't Mind")	Won
2012	MOBO Awards	Best Reggae Act	Won
2013	Youth View Awards	Favorite Local International Artiste of the Year	Won
2013	Star Awards	Album of the Year (Tomahawk Technique)	Won
2013	MOBO Awards	Best Reggae Act	Won
2017	Brit Awards	British Single of the Year ("Rockabye") (with Clean Bandit and Anne-Marie)	Nominated
2017	Brit Awards	British Video of the Year ("Hair") (with Little Mix)	Nominated
2017	Brit Awards	British Video of the Year ("Rockabye") (with Clean Bandit and Anne-Marie)	Nominated
2017	MTV Europe Music Awards	Best Song ("Rockabye") (with Clean Bandit and Anne-Marie)	Nominated
2019	Berlin Music Video Awards	Best VFX ('Boasty')	Nominated
2021	MOBO Awards	Best Reggae Act	Nominated
2022	MOBO Awards	Best Reggae Act	

== See also ==
- List of UK top-ten singles in 2017
