= Money Jane =

2000 single by Baby Blue Soundcrew

Single by Baby Blue Soundcrew featuring Kardinal Offishall, Sean Paul, and Jully Black

from the album Private Party Collectors Edition
- Released: 2000
- Genre: Canadian hip hop, dancehall
- Length: 4:19 (single version); 3:12 (album version)
- Label: Universal Music Canada
- Songwriters: J. Harrow; S. Henriques
- Producer: Kardinal Offishall

Baby Blue Soundcrew singles chronology
"Money Jane" (2000)	"Too Much" (2000)

Kardinal Offishall singles chronology
"Husslin'" (2000)	"Money Jane" (2000)	"BaKardi Slang" (2001)

Sean Paul singles chronology
"Deport Them" (1998)	"Money Jane" (2000)	"Gimme the Light" (2002)

Jully Black singles chronology
"Rally'n" (1998)	"Money Jane" (2000)	"Ol' Time Killin'" (2001)

Music video
- "Money Jane" on YouTube

"Money Jane" is a song recorded by Canadian DJ group Baby Blue Soundcrew featuring Canadian rapper Kardinal Offishall, Jamaican musician Sean Paul, and Canadian singer-songwriter Jully Black. It was released by Universal Music Canada in 2000, and was the first single from the group's debut studio compilation album Private Party Collectors Edition; a remix was included on Offishall's 2001 album Quest for Fire: Firestarter, Vol. 1. "Money Jane" is a Canadian hip hop and dancehall song with lyrics about a wealthy woman who provides financial and material support for her male companion. The song is noted for its influence on Toronto's hip hop music scene, and is credited with launching Paul's international music career.

== Background and release ==
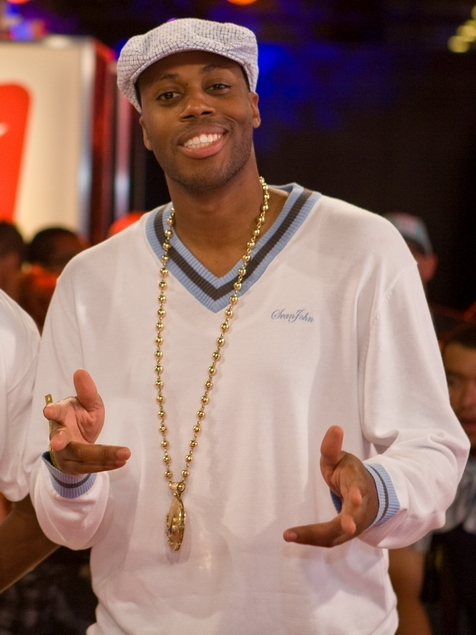
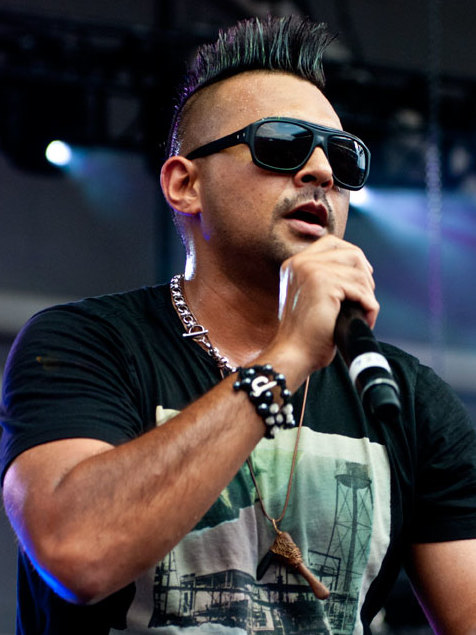
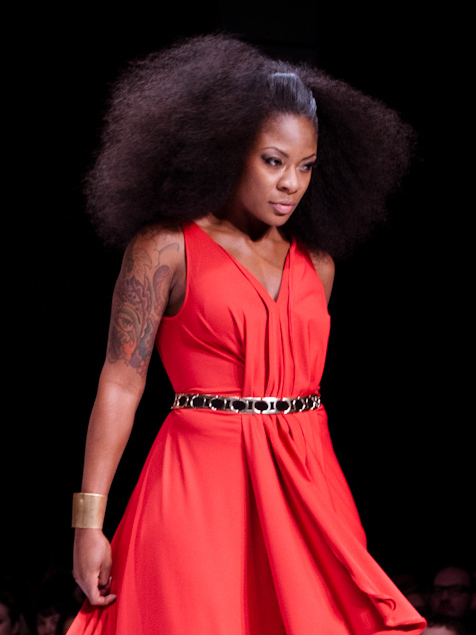
"Money Jane" featured artists Kardinal Offishall, Sean Paul, and Jully Black

Offishall, Black, and Baby Blue Soundcrew member Kid Kut initially met through Fresh Arts, a jobs program implemented by the government of Ontario in the wake of the early 1990s recession that provided funding and education for young and emerging artists in the province. "Money Jane" was originally written and produced by Offishall for his second album, 2001's Quest for Fire: Firestarter, Vol. 1. At the suggestion of Kid Kut and Baby Blue Soundcrew member KLC, the song was rearranged to include Paul, who at the time was largely unknown outside of his native Jamaica and Jamaican diasporic communities. Kid Kut believed that Paul's lyrical and performance style made him well-suited for the Canadian market and traveled to Jamaica, where Paul recorded his verse. As the producers did not have access to Pro Tools, Paul's portion had to be manually recorded and inserted in the track; Offishall later re-recorded his portion to give the impression of a seamless production.

"Money Jane" was released as the debut single off of Private Party Collectors Edition, Baby Blue Soundcrew's first major studio album after having previously released self-published mixtapes exclusively. A remix of the song appeared on Offishall's Quest for Fire: Firestarter, Vol. 1; the song was also included on the soundtrack for the 2002 film Showtime. A music video for "Money Jane" was also released, with Kevin De Freitas as director.

== Lyrics ==
"Money Jane" (2000)
A 25-second sample of "Money Jane", featuring Paul and Offishall's first verse and Black's chorus.

In a spoken intro, Offishall introduces the song as following "the adventures of Miss Money Jane, everybody's oldest girlfriend." Over a joint verse with Paul he describes Money Jane as a wealthy female companion who supports him financially, buying him luxury goods and paying his rent. Offishall details their history as longtime friends over the second verse, recounting an incident where an ex-girlfriend expressed displeasure over his relationship with Money Jane; Offishall rebuffs the ex, arguing that Money Jane is looking out for his best interests. In the final verse, Paul details Money Jane's jet set lifestyle with the repeated hook "she get around, she get around a lot." Over a chorus repeated throughout the song, Black tells the listener that they can find Money Jane if they seek her out, but warns them to "think about what you lookin' for."

== Reception and recognition ==
"Money Jane" was positively received by critics. Rolling Stone noted that the song "patented [Offishall's] club-ready flow," while music critic Klive Walker wrote that the song "raised the stakes of reggae/rap collaborations," citing it as "an excellent example of a tune where Kardinal's diasporic dancehall deejay style merged with his Canadian rap approach" which "combines well with Sean Paul's Jamaican flow." Reviewing "Money Jane" for a Complex retrospective, Alex Nino Gheciu wrote that the single was "ahead of its time in many ways," noting that "amid the bitches-and-hoes era of rap, it was a tune that celebrated its female subject’s entrepreneurial spirit and financial independence."

In 2001, "Money Jane" was nominated for a Juno Award for Rap Recording of the Year, though the award was won by Swollen Members for their album Balance in what Billboard described as an "unexpected" upset. That same year, "Money Jane" won a MuchMusic Video Award for Best Rap Video. At the 12th SOCAN Awards held by the Society of Composers, Authors and Music Publishers of Canada in 2002, the song was recognized as the most-performed Canadian urban song in 2001.

== Legacy and influence ==
Toronto's always been this big melting pot of cultures and music styles and genres. We are about that Caribbean vibe: everybody you knew, even from two doors down, was West Indian. That was what Toronto sounded like, to me. Dancehall was underground music at the time, so for "Money Jane" to be mainstream across the country was like, wow.

— Kid Kut,
Baby Blue Soundcrew

"Money Jane" was Paul's first music video, and is credited with launching his international music career. In an interview with The Fader, Paul noted "Canada was the first place, internationally, to endorse me," as "Money Jane" built him a fanbase in Canada that resulted in American radio stations such as Hot 97 taking notice of his music. While shooting the music video for "Money Jane" in Toronto, Paul met music video director Julien Christian Lutz (Director X) and choreographer Tanisha Scott; their future collaborations, including the singles "Gimme the Light", "Get Busy", and "Like Glue", propelled Paul to international fame.

The song was one of the first dancehall songs to achieve mainstream popularity in Canada, and is noted as a major influence on the sound of Canadian hip-hop in the 2000s. Black credits the song for moving the sound of Toronto hip-hop from an "analog" and "heavy" sound influenced by Detroit hip hop and soul music, to dancehall-influenced club music. Anupa Mistry of The Fader notes that the song "helped define [Toronto's] musical identity" by cultivating a "Toronto sound," noting it as a Canadian take on "jiggy" rap popular in the late 1990s and early 2000s.

== Formats and track listings ==
=== 12" single ===
Side A

1. "Money Jane" – 4:19
2. "Money Jane" (Clean Version) – 4:19
3. "Money Jane" (Instrumental) – 4:15

Side B

1. "Too Much" – 4:18
2. "Too Much" (Clean Version) – 4:15
3. "Too Much" (Instrumental) – 4:15

== Charts ==
Chart	Peak position
Canadian Singles Chart	24
MuchMusic Countdown	1
