= Stage One (disambiguation) =

Stage One is a 2000 album by Sean Paul.

Stage One may also refer to:

- Stage-one cancer
- Stage One in Demographic transition
- Stage One International Film Festival

== Studios ==
- Stage One, Old Warner Brothers Studio
- 20th Century Fox Stage One, where A Date with Elvis and other Elvis Presley shows recorded
- Stage One, Studio Tour
- Stage One Studio of Andy Classen
- Stage One Theatre Brisbane, The Little Dog Laughed
- Stage One (formerly Theatre Investment Fund), Thelma Holt of the National Theatre
- Stage One, Chabot College Theater Department
