= I'm Still in Love with You (Sean Paul song) =

2003 single by Sean Paul

Single by Sean Paul featuring Sasha

from the album Dutty Rock
- B-side: "Top of the Game"; "Like Glue" (remix)
- Released: 6 October 2003
- Genre: Reggae
- Length: 4:33
- Label: VP; Atlantic
- Songwriters: Alton Ellis; Sean Henriques; Cleveland Browne; Wycliffe Johnson
- Producers: Steely & Clevie; Murray Elias

Sean Paul singles chronology
"Baby Boy" (2003)	"I'm Still in Love with You" (2003)	"Three Little Birds" (2004)

Music video
- "I'm Still in Love with You" on YouTube

"I'm Still in Love with You" is a song by Jamaican recording artist Sean Paul for his second studio album, Dutty Rock (2002). It features vocals from Sasha. Released on 6 October 2003, the song reached number six in the United Kingdom and number 14 on the US Billboard Hot 100 chart. It also became a top-10 hit in Hungary, Italy, Ireland, and Switzerland.

== Composition ==
The song is an interpolation of "I'm Still in Love with You" by Alton Ellis. Sean Paul and Sasha (the female counterpart) are discussing a stalled and seemingly unfulfilled relationship. Paul's character is trying to explain that the relationship was somewhat of an extended one-night stand, and that it has no future; Sasha's character seems to want to continue the relationship, despite Paul's admittance of "thug" love because she remains in love with him.

Though the original version's message was more vague, the message in this version seems much clearer in explaining the relationship between the characters in the song's story. Alton Ellis' version was originally produced as a one-man song, but he later teamed up with his sister Hortense Ellis to perform a duet. It wasn't until this moment that the song showed a romantic battle between two parties to continue a seemingly ruined relationship.

== Music video ==
The music video was directed by Director X, known as Little X at the time. The video revolves around two main love interests reminiscing over their former affair. The lead female role is model Sara Liz Pickett. The lead female dancer is choreographer Tanisha Scott.

== Track listings ==
US CD single

1. "I'm Still in Love with You" (edited album version)
2. "Top of the Game" (edited album version featuring Rahzel)

US and UK 12-inch single

A1. "I'm Still in Love with You" (album version) – 4:33 (4:32 in UK)
A2. "I'm Still in Love with You" (instrumental) – 4:14 (4:32 in UK)
B1. "I'm Still in Love with You" (radio edit) – 3:31 (3:35 in UK)
B2. "Like Glue" (Giv Dem a Run remix) – 4:03

Australian CD single

1. "I'm Still in Love with You" (7-inch radio edit) – 3:35
2. "Steppin' Razor" (live on Later with Jools Holland) – 3:26
3. "Like Glue" (Giv Dem a Run remix) – 4:03

European CD single

1. "I'm Still in Love with You" (album version) – 4:33
2. "Like Glue" (Giv Dem a Run remix) – 4:03

UK CD1

1. "I'm Still in Love with You" (7-inch radio edit) – 3:35
2. "Like Glue" (Giv Dem a Run remix) – 4:03

UK CD2

1. "I'm Still in Love with You" (7-inch radio edit) – 3:35
2. "Steppin' Razor" (live on Later with Jools Holland) – 3:26
3. "Like Glue" (live on Later with Jools Holland) – 3:07
4. "I'm Still in Love with You" (video)

UK 7-inch single

A. "I'm Still in Love with You" (7-inch radio version) – 3:35
B. "I'm Still in Love with You" (instrumental) – 4:32

== Charts ==
=== Weekly charts ===
Weekly chart performance for "I'm Still in Love with You"
Chart (2003–2004)	Peak position
Australia (ARIA)	20
Australian Urban (ARIA)	8
Austria (Ö3 Austria Top 40)	11
Belgium (Ultratop 50 Flanders)	42
Belgium (Ultratop 50 Wallonia)	34
Canada CHR/Pop Top 30 (Radio & Records)	20
Canada (Nielsen SoundScan)	15
Denmark (Tracklisten)	11
Finland (Suomen virallinen lista)	12
France (SNEP)	31
Germany (GfK)	19
Hungary (Dance Top 40)	4
Ireland (IRMA)	7
Italy (FIMI)	6
Netherlands (Dutch Top 40 Tipparade)	2
Netherlands (Single Top 100)	35
Poland (PiF PaF)	1
Romania (Romanian Top 100)	45
Scottish Singles Sales (Official Charts)	13
Sweden (Sverigetopplistan)	38
Switzerland (Schweizer Hitparade)	10
UK Singles (Official Charts)	6
UK Hip Hop/R&B (Official Charts)	2
US Billboard Hot 100	14
US Hot R&B/Hip-Hop Songs (Billboard)	13
US Pop Airplay (Billboard)	17
US Rhythmic Airplay (Billboard)	11

=== Year-end charts ===
Year-end chart performance for "I'm Still in Love with You"
Chart (2004)	Position
Italy (FIMI)	46
Switzerland (Schweizer Hitparade)	50
UK Singles (OCC)	50
US Billboard Hot 100	60
US Hot R&B/Hip-Hop Singles & Tracks (Billboard)	48
US Hot Rap Tracks (Billboard)	25
US Mainstream Top 40 (Billboard)	91
US Rhythmic Top 40 (Billboard)	48

== Certifications ==
Certifications for "I'm Still in Love with You"
Region	Certification	Certified units/sales
New Zealand (RMNZ)	Gold	15,000^{‡}
United Kingdom (BPI)	Gold	400,000^{‡}
^{‡} Sales+streaming figures based on certification alone.

== Release history ==
Release dates and formats for "I'm Still in Love with You"
Region	Date	Format(s)	Label(s)	Ref.
United States	6 October 2003	Rhythmic contemporary; contemporary hit radio	VP; Atlantic	
United States	27 October 2003	Urban radio	VP; Atlantic	
United Kingdom	5 January 2004	7-inch vinyl; CD	VP; Atlantic	
Australia	23 February 2004	CD	VP; Atlantic	

== Cover version ==
In 2019, Brazilian singer Anitta remade and reenacted the visuals for Sean Paul's original video with her song "Terremoto," featuring Brazilian rapper Kevinho. The video ends with the following messages: "Thank You Sean Paul" and "~~Directed~~ Remade by João Papa".
