= Kevin De Freitas =

Canadian filmmaker

Kevin De Freitas is a Canadian filmmaker.

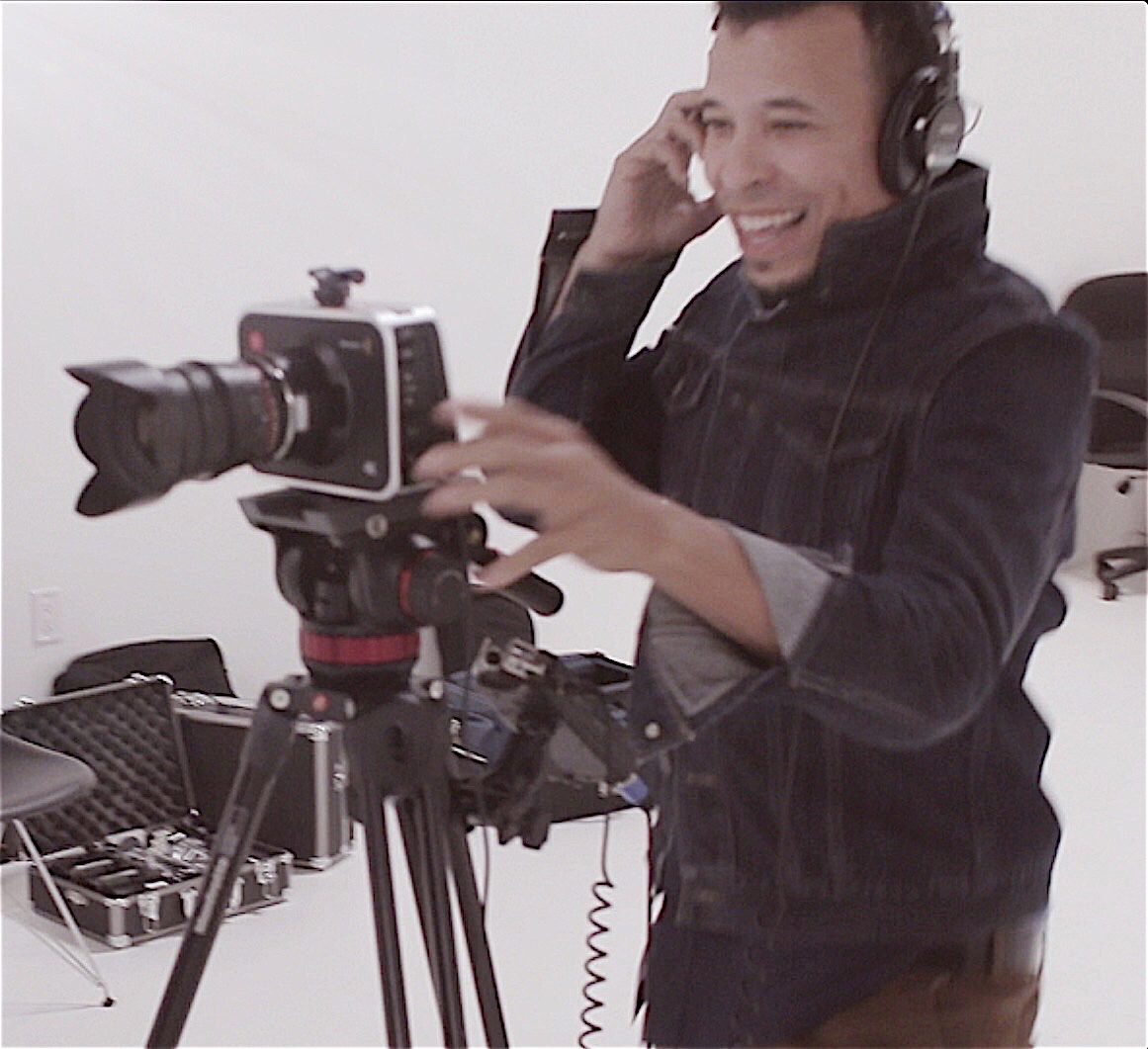
Director Kevin De Freitas

== Career ==
De Freitas has worked with Universal, BMG, Columbia Records, Def Jam, Sony, EMI, VP Records, Boost Mobile, ACLC Advertising, and The Hershey Company. He directed the Canadian series of 30 and 60 sec. Make Poverty History "Click" campaign PSAs for the Live 8 concert event for Africa, produced by Bono (U2).

NorthBay Media Arts commissioned him to direct their script "Toobie". A coming-of-age story centered on bullying. The 45min Short Feature Film premiered at the Maryland International Film Festival. Over 10,000 middle school students per year watch the film from Philadelphia to Washington, D.C., discussing conflict resolutions, the power of education, and the ripple effect of making positive decisions.

== Awards and recognition ==
At the 2008 MuchMusic Video Awards, he won Best Director and Best Video of the Year for Hedley's "For the Nights I Can't Remember". He also won Best Rock Video and Best Cinematography for Hedley's "She's So Sorry". In 2007, he was awarded Best Pop Video for Hedley's "Gunnin". In 2003, he won a Best Pop MMVA for Shawn Desman's "Get Ready". The Reel World Film Festival presented De Freitas with a Trailblazer Award for Achievement in Filmmaking in 2002. In 2001, he won a Best Rap Video MMVA for Baby Blue Soundcrew's "Money Jane" (featuring Sean Paul, Kardinal Offishall and Jully Black).

== Personal life ==
He currently lives in Los Angeles, CA.
