= Hot Girl (Belly song) =

Single by Belly featuring Snoop Dogg

from the album Back For the First Time Vol.1 and Sleepless Nights 1.5
- Released: September 8, 2009 (iTunes)
- Recorded: 2009
- Genre: Hip hop
- Length: 4:14
- Label: CP Records
- Songwriters: Ahmad Balshe; Calvin Broadus
- Producer: Jason "DaHeala" Quenneville

Belly singles chronology
| "Amnesia" (2009) | "Hot Girl" (2009) | "Automatic" (2010) |

Snoop Dogg singles chronology
| "Day Dreaming" (2009) | "Hot Girl" (2009) | "Dime Piece" (2009) |

"Hot Girl" is a song by Canadian rapper Belly featuring vocals from American rapper Snoop Dogg. It is a song from DJ Smallz's 2009 mixtape Back For the First Time Vol.1 and was released on September 8, 2009 as the first single off Belly's second album Sleepless Nights 1.5 (2012). The song, which samples "Bubble Like Soup" by Timberlee featuring Ward 21, peaked at number 58 on the Canadian Hot 100.

The accompanying music video for the song was directed by RT! and features both artists hanging out with various women painted in gold and silver. In addition to Back For the First Time Vol.1 and Sleepless Nights 1.5, "Hot Girl" was featured on the compilation MuchDance 2010.

== Music video ==
The video was directed by Canadian director RT! (his 100th video) and was an all-day shoot that took place in Toronto on September 15, 2009. The video starts with Belly sitting on a regal chair with alcohol placed on an end table to his right side while he witnesses three women painted in gold dance in front of him. It then cuts to Snoop sitting on a silver sofa with two women who're also painted in silver as it cuts to them performing steelwork. The video cuts to both artists with their backs against each other as the screen dims into red and their surrounded by the same women (now being joined by other women who're not painted) posing with weapons. The video ends with Belly dropping his cigarette on the chair and walks away as it burns.

== Chart performance ==
The song debuted at number 58, its highest peak on the chart, on the week of September 26, 2009 before going ten spots down for two consecutive weeks and leaving the chart. It reappeared on the chart for two non-consecutive weeks: number 97 on the week of October 24 and number 89 on the week of November 6.

| Chart (2009) | Peak position |
|---|---|
| Canada Hot 100 (Billboard) | 58 |

== Awards and nominations ==
2010 MuchMusic Video Awards

- VideoFACT Indie Video of the Year (Won)
- MuchVIBE Hip Hop Video of the Year (Nominated)
- Cinematographer of the Year (Nominated)
