= List of reggae fusion artists =

This is a list of reggae fusion artists. This includes artists who have either been very important to the genre, or have had a considerable amount of exposure (such as in the case of one that has been on a major label). Bands are listed by the first letter in their name (not including the words "a", "an", or "the"), and individuals are listed by last name.

== # ==
- 2face Idibia
- 311

== A ==
- Ace of Base
- Aidonia
- Andru Donalds
- Astro
- Audio Active
- Ava Leigh

== B ==
- Bad Brains
- Barrington Levy
- Beenie Man
- Born Jamericans
- Bounty Killer
- Brick & Lace
- Bridgit Mendler
- Buju Banton
- Busy Signal
- Bryan Art

== C ==
- Cham
- Che'Nelle
- Cherine Anderson
- Christopher Martin
- Chronixx
- Collie Buddz
- Costi Ioniță

== D ==
- Damian Marley
- Demarco
- Dirty Heads
- Diana King
- Don Yute
- Dr.Alban
- Dub War

== E ==
- Ego-Wrappin'
- Elephant Man
- Empire ISIS
- Enur
- Emblem3

== G ==
- Gentleman
- Gyptian

== H ==
- Heavy D
- The Holdup

== I ==
- Ini Kamoze
- Inner Circle
- Iyaz

== J ==
- Jagatara
- Jah Cure
- Jazmine Sullivan
- Junior Reid

== K ==
- K'naan
- Kardinal Offishall
- Ky-Mani Marley

== L ==
- Lady Saw
- Laza Morgan
- Let's Go Bowling

== M ==
- Mad Cobra
- Mad Lion
- Magic!
- Major Lazer
- Matisyahu
- Maxi Priest
- Mavado (singer)
- Men at Work
- Michael Franti & Spearhead
- The Movement
- Mr. Vegas
- Ms. Triniti

== N ==
- Natasja Saad
- Nahko and Medicine for the People
- No Doubt
- No-Maddz

== O ==
- Olly Murs
- Ocean Alley

== P ==
- Patra
- The Police
- Popcaan
- Pepper
- Protoje

== R ==
- Rayvon
- Reel Big Fish
- Richie Stephens
- Rihanna
- Rikrok

== S ==
- Sadiki
- Sean Kingston
- Sean Paul
- Seeed
- Serani
- Shabba Ranks
- Shaggy
- Shinehead
- Sizzla
- Skindred
- The Skints
- Slightly Stoopid
- Snoop Lion
- Snow
- Spice
- Stick Figure
- Sticky Fingers
- Sublime
- Super Cat

== T ==
- T.O.K.
- Tami Chynn
- Teacha Dee
- Tessanne Chin
- Third World
- Tony Rebel

== U ==
- UB40

== V ==
- Voicemail
- Vybz Kartel

== W ==
- Walk off the Earth
- Wayne Marshall
- Wayne Wonder

== Z ==
- Zeroscape
