= Amie Casey =

Australian actress and producer

Amie Casey (born 8 September 1990) is an Australian actress and producer.

== Early life ==
Amie Casey was born in Milton, New South Wales and grew up in Bellambi. She attended Wollongong High School Of The Performing Arts before relocating to Maryborough, Queensland as a teenager. Amie was an active member of her high school drama team and participated in multiple school plays. She moved to Brisbane upon graduation at Aldridge State High School in 2008 to pursue a career in the arts.

== Personal life ==
Amie resides in Brisbane and is the mother of two children, Arielle and Shoaib. She is an animal lover and advocate of female rights.

== Career ==
In 2011, Amie began modelling for local brands throughout Brisbane and the Gold Coast. She soon moved into styling and fashion design and launched a wearable couture label in 2014 called Kill Casey.

The label failed to take off, and 2015 saw Amie propelled into the film and television industry, where she acted in a number of local productions, including BMC's short film '9ball', directed by Darwin Brooks. Amie also joined the Stage One International Film Festival team in 2015/2016 as the Entertainment Director.

In late 2015, Amie joined the production We Were Tomorrow as a co-producer, which stars Chai Hansen, Gyton Grantley, Alicia Banit and Madeleine Kennedy. Initially a feature film, the production later reformatted in 2016 as a television series and other well-known actors joined the cast, including Tessa James, Johnny (Beau) Brady and Nic Westaway.

In early 2017, Amie joined the Queensland television production Stage Mums as a producer and contributed to the full eight episodes of the third season.
