= Our World (album) =

Studio album by T.O.K.
- Released: August 24, 2009
- Genres: Dancehall; reggae fusion
- Length: 53:26
- Label: VP

T.O.K. chronology
| Unknown Language (2005) | Our World (2009) |

Professional ratings
Review scores
| Source | Rating |
|---|---|
| RapReviews | 6/10 stars |

Our World is the third studio album from dancehall and reggae fusion group T.O.K., released in 2009.

== Track listing ==
All tracks include production by group members Alistaire McCalla, Roshaun Clarke, Craig Thompson, and Xavier Davidson. Only additional production and songwriting credits are listed.

1. "Intro: Our World" (M. Lawrence) — 2:06
2. "World Is Mine" (R. Bailey, R. Fuller, A. Marshall) — 3:56
3. "Guardian Angel" (A. Cooper, C. Morrison) — 3:16
4. "Couple Up" (Cooper, Morrison) — 1:30
5. "Gangsters Never Die" (D. Fearon, Cindy Walker) — 2:45
6. "I Wanna Love You" (Lawrence) — 3:54
7. "Gimme Little [If You Want Me]" (K. Thompson) — 3:53
8. "Me and My Dawgs" (A. Kelly, L. Romans) — 3:42
9. "Die for You" (C. Parkes) — 3:50
10. "Afternoon Porn Star" (Kelly) — 4:10
11. "It's Over" (Kelly) — 4:25
12. "Miss World" (featuring Beenie Man) (M. Davis) — 3:15
13. "Whining" (Vanguards remix) (C. Bahamonde, D. Ornellana, U. Vargas — the original track is on Flexx from T.O.K. presents: D'Link) — 2:41
14. "Gyrate" (S. Brown, D. Medder) — 2:54
15. "Get Out [Don't Come Back]" (Brown) — 3:22
16. "Live It Up" (acoustic version) (Kelly, L. De La O) — 3:47
