= Unknown Language =

Studio album by T.O.K.
- Released: June 21, 2005
- Recorded: 2004–2005
- Genres: Dancehall; reggae fusion
- Label: VP

T.O.K. chronology
My Crew, My Dawgs (2001)	Unknown Language (2005)	Our World (2009)

Professional ratings
Review scores
Source	Rating
AllMusic	link

Unknown Language is the second studio album from the dancehall and reggae fusion group T.O.K., released in 2005.

== Track listing ==
1. "Hey Ladies"
2. "Solid as a Rock"
3. "Fire Fire"
4. "She's Hotter" (featuring Pitbull)
5. "Tell Me If You Still Care"
6. "Footprints (When You Cry)"
7. "Wah Gwaan" (featuring Shaggy)
8. "Survivor"
9. "Music's Pumping"
10. "Weak"
11. "No Way Jose"
12. "High"
13. "Galang Gal"
14. "Neck Breakers"
15. "Gal You Ah Lead"
16. "Unknown Language"
17. "This Is How We Roll"
18. "Life"

== Singles ==
Year	Song	Chart positions		
Year	Song	U.S. Hot 100	U.S. R&B	U.S. Rap
2005	"Gal You Ah Lead"	85	36	24
2005	"Footprints"	93	22	19
