= Deport Them =

Single by Sean Paul

from the album BookShelf and Stage One
- Released: 22 September 1998
- Recorded: 1998
- Genre: Dancehall
- Length: 3:08
- Label: VP; Atlantic
- Songwriter: Sean Paul
- Producer: Tony "CD" Kelly

Sean Paul singles chronology
"Deport Them" (1998)	"Money Jane" (2000)

"Deport Them" is the first single released by reggae-dancehall artist Sean Paul from his debut album Stage One. Originally released in 1998, co-written and produced by Tony "CD" Kelly, it reached number 80 on the Billboard R&B chart in 2000. The song was briefly featured in the 2003 film 2 Fast 2 Furious. Sean appeared in the 1998 film Belly, and used a sample from a song on its soundtrack, "Bashment Time" by Mr. Easy and Frisco Kid, in "Deport Them".

== Song synopsis ==
The song deals with the subject of sexually attractive women, as well as Sean's attitude to women who do not fit his aesthetic criteria. He says that if a girl is "nuh di modeling type wi nuh court dem/but if ah di big beauty queen wi support dem". Equally if a girl is "nuh up to date wi deport dem" or "can't keep up wit di trends wi report them". The song, then, uses the metaphor of immigration and state control and applies them to Paul's concept of feminine beauty, seeming to imply that women who are not up to his standards should be forced to leave the country. He later extends this metaphor stating that "wi hafi tell dem one ting customary/Keep it tight just like di military", seeming to invoke the Jamaican military's ban on recruiting homosexuals. Paul is unrepentant saying: "wi nuh sorry... Bad Man nuh sorry cuz wi done hit di cherry" arguing that he is not a misogynist, for "done legendary nuff gal wife he marry". Therefore, the song can be interpreted as both a love song, and as a paean. The song uses the "Bookshelf" riddim. The song is featured on the compilation album BookShelf, which also includes Sasha's "Dat Sexy Body". It was also featured on the compilation Reggae Gold 2002.

== Music video ==
The video for the song is split between Sean Paul and Mr. Vegas' "Hot Gal Today" and "Deport Them", the former section featuring scantily clad young women sat around Mr. Vegas and Paul and performing pole dances. At around one minute, ten seconds into the video a character is introduced as "Peanut: Purveyor of Fine Women" ushering in the "Deport Them" section of the video. Peanut is accompanied by three young ladies who are introduced as "Peanut's Angels", before being introduced specifically by the nicknames "Mocha Puff", "Cappuccino" and "Cocoa Caramel Crunch". The introduction of these characters as 'fine women' appears to be ironic, as they are constantly juxtaposed with the girls originally featuring in the video, and the video closes with Peanut and his friends being led through a door marked "VIP", which is then bolted behind them.

== Charts ==
Chart (2000)	Peak position
U.S. Billboard Hot R&B/Hip-Hop Singles & Tracks	80
