= My Crew, My Dawgs =

Studio album by T.O.K.
- Released: 2001
- Genres: Dancehall; reggae fusion
- Length: 56:19
- Label: VP
- Producers: Chris Chin; Joel Chin; Richard Browne

T.O.K. chronology
My Crew, My Dawgs (2001)	Unknown Language (2005)

Professional ratings
Review scores
Source	Rating
AllMusic	4/5 stars

My Crew, My Dawgs is the debut album by T.O.K., released in 2001.

== Track listing ==
All songs by R. Clarke, Xavier Davidson, A. McCalla, and C. Thompson unless otherwise indicated.

1. "Prophecy" [intro] — 1:40
2. "Man Ah Bad Man" — 2:53
3. "Chi-Chi Man" — 3:24
4. "Gimmi Da Muzik" — 3:19
5. "The Way U Do the Things U Do" [accapella interlude] (Smokey Robinson, Robert Rogers) — 0:49
6. "Money 2 Burn" — 3:33
7. "Mona Lisa" [2002 stylee] — 3:55
8. "All Day" — 3:45
9. "Ghetto Youths Anthem" [interlude] — 0:39
10. "Keep It Blazing" — 3:23
11. "Eagles Cry" — 2:31
12. "Gun Shy" — 3:01
13. "You Ah Murder" — 2:49
14. "On the Radio" — 3:10
15. "Watch & Protect" [interlude] — 0:19
16. "I Believe" (Jeff Pence, Eliot Sloan) — 3:49
17. "Shake Yuh Bam Bam" — 2:42
18. "Saturday" — 3:45
19. "Alone" — 2:56
20. "Somebody's Watching Me" [hidden track] — 3:57

The Japan edition (released in 2002) includes two bonus tracks between the tracks "Alone" and "Somebody's Watchin' Me (Creepin')":

1. "Bad Man Anthem"
2. "Girlz Girlz"
