= Dutty Rock =

Studio album by Sean Paul
- Released: 12 November 2002
- Genre: Dancehall; R&B; hip-hop
- Length: 74:50
- Language: English; Jamaican Patois; Spanish
- Label: VP; Atlantic
- Producer: Jeremy Harding; The Neptunes; Mark Ronson; Beyoncé

Sean Paul chronology
Stage One (2000)	Dutty Rock (2002)	The Trinity (2005)

Singles from Dutty Rock
- 1. "Gimme the Light" Released: 2001; 2. "Get Busy" Released: 27 January 2003; 3. "Like Glue" Released: 27 May 2003; 4. "I'm Still in Love with You" Released: 6 October 2003

Dutty Rock (West Indian patois for "dirty rock") is the second studio album by the Jamaican rapper and singer Sean Paul. Released on 12 November 2002 through VP Records and Atlantic Records, it was largely inspired by the social environment and music culture of his youth in Jamaica. Paul worked with longtime collaborators like Jeremy Harding, Tony "CD" Kelly, Delroy Foster, and Steely & Clevie, while also teaming up with new producers including Mark Ronson, The Neptunes, King Jammy, and Ward 21.

The album was widely praised for its infectious energy, catchy hooks, and high-quality production, though some critics noted uneven performances and filler content. A major international success, it opened at number 26 and later peaked at number nine on the US Billboard 200, while topping charts in Canada and the US Reggae Albums chart. It also reached the top five or ten across Europe, Oceania, and the United Kingdom, earning multiple Platinum and Gold certifications worldwide.

Dutty Rock spawned several top-ten hits, including "Gimme the Light", "Get Busy", "Like Glue" and "I'm Still in Love with You", and was re-released in 2003 with "Baby Boy", a number-one hit collaboration with Beyoncé. In the years since its release, the album has become a landmark dancehall album that introduced Jamaican music to a global audience and elevated Paul to international stardom. Dutty Rock's impact was recognized in 2004 when it earned him the Grammy Award for Best Reggae Album.

== Background ==
In 2000, Sean Paul released his debut studio album, Stage One, through Caribbean-focused label VP Records. The album marked his first breakthrough on the international stage, driven by the single "Deport Them." For his next project Dutty Rock, he partnered with Atlantic Records. The album was largely shaped by the social environment and music culture of Paul's youth in Jamaica. Paul and his collaborators aimed to create music that reflected the feel of Jamaican house parties rather than crafting songs with international audiences in mind. His focus was on making tracks that resonated with local listeners and captured the energy he felt on the dance floor, not on pursuing mainstream crossover success. As with Stage One, Paul retemamed with Jeremy Harding, Tony "CD" Kelly, Delroy Foster, Steely & Clevie, while also collaborating with new producers and artists, including Mark Ronson, Richard "Richie D" Martin, Andre "Rookie" Tyrell, The Neptunes, King Jammy, and Ward 21. Regarding the title, Sean Paul explained in an interview with The Guardian: "'Dutty' means 'dirty': It means 'dirty rock' [...] It means, ‘Yeah, we rock—or you rock, man. My cool is hardcore."

== Critical reception ==
Professional ratings
Review scores
Source	Rating
AllMusic	4/5 stars
Blender	4/5 stars
Los Angeles Times	2.5/4 stars
Muzik	3/5 stars
Now	4/5 stars
Pitchfork	7.8/10
Q	4/5 stars
RapReviews	9/10
Rolling Stone	2/5 stars
The Rolling Stone Album Guide	3/5 stars

The album was met with critical acclaim among both urban and mainstream outlets. Tim Sendra of AllMusic gave the album four out of five stars, calling it "an infectious record, bursting with hooks and filled with energy." Robert Marriott, writing for Blender, also rated the album four stars out of five, stating "like Supercat, his Daddy Cool predecessor in dancehall, Paul's style translates well to hip-hop fans." Jay Soul of RapReviews rated the album a 9 out of 10 score, praising the sound of the album, calling it "just a great listen, pretty much start to finish, and the replay value is high [...] The production values on Dutty Rock are so outstandingly high, that when coupled with the ultra-melodic sing/rap style it guarantees success." BBC Music critic Darren Springer felt that Dutty Rock "demonstrates Sean Pauls versatility, from dancehall to R&B to hip hop. The album is a must have for anyone who consider themselves to be a dancehall fan. It's going to blow up baby."

Now editor Matt Galloway felt that on Dutty Rock "Paul sticks with what he knows, bringing in Jamaican production giants like Lenky, Steelie & Clevie, Flabba and King Jammy for a straight-up dancehall throwdown. Even The Neptunes' typically blinding beat on "Bubble," a tabla and flute-driven slink, seems more inspired by the soundsystem than hiphop." Jon Caramanica, writing for Rolling Stone, argued that Paul was "at best a middling MC. But even the most dowdy roots numbers here sparkle on the chorus, which is sometimes just enough." Los Angeles Times critic Natalie Nichols found that the album was overlong and concluded: "The production at times is a saving grace, adding a particularly appealing bit of clacking percussion or some squiggly ray-gun buzzes and bleeps. But the handful of silly between-song skits is soooo cliched." Sputnikmusic's Benjamin Jack felt that while Dutty Rock "has flashes of creativity and some genuinely entertaining moments. it's just unfortunate that these moments are scattered so offhandedly throughout such a muddled, unfocused record."

== Commercial performance ==
Dutty Rock debuted at number 26 on the US Billboard 200, with first-week sales of 65,000 copies, and later peaked at number nine. In North America, the album achieved further prominence, reaching number one on both the Canadian Albums Chart and the Canadian R&B Albums Chart, and topping the US Reggae Albums Chart. It was certified triple Platinum by the Recording Industry Association of America (RIAA) in December 2022, denoting sales exceeding 2.7 million units in the United States. In Canada, it received triple Platinum certification for shipments surpassing 300,000 units. In Oceania, the album peaked at number four on the Australian Urban Albums Chart and number five in New Zealand.

In the United Kingdom and Ireland, Dutty Rock attained number two on both the UK Albums Chart and the Irish Albums Chart, while reaching number three on the Scottish Albums Chart, and earning triple Platinum certification from the British Phonographic Industry (BPI) for over 900,000 combined sales and streams. Across continental Europe, the album reached the top five in Norway (number four), Austria, Sweden, and number seven in the Netherlands and Italy, number eight in Walloon region of Belgium, and number ten in Germany and the Flemish region of Belgium. Certifications included Platinum in Germany, and Switzerland, and Gold in Austria, Denmark, France (double Gold), the Netherlands, Norway, Sweden, Argentina, Australia, Mexico, and New Zealand.

== Legacy ==
Dutty Rock is widely regarded as a seminal work in the evolution of contemporary dancehall and played a pivotal role in introducing Jamaican music to a global audience. The album's success facilitated the crossover of dancehall into mainstream popular music, blending traditional Jamaican rhythms and patois with elements of R&B and pop, and established a template for subsequent dancehall and Caribbean musicians seeking international recognition. Critical appraisal of Dutty Rock has emphasized its dual achievement of maintaining the authenticity of dancehall while achieving crossover appeal. Retrospective evaluations have highlighted the album's "tectonic hooks and uncanny pop melodies," noting that it successfully preserved the rhythmic complexity and stylistic distinctiveness of dancehall while rendering it comprehensible to listeners outside its traditional cultural context. In 2022, two decades after its release, Billboard commented that Dutty Rock was continuing to be cited as a landmark recording that redefined the international reach of dancehall and had solidified Paul's status as one of its foremost ambassadors.

Paul himself views Dutty Rock as a "classic" and a defining moment in his career. He has consistently emphasized the album's significance both personally and culturally. He regards it as a defining work in his career, noting that it left an enduring imprint on listeners and continues to resonate with fans worldwide. Paul has highlighted the longevity of the album's tracks, observing that they remain staples in clubs, parties, and radio rotations, underscoring their sustained popularity and cultural relevance. In discussing the creation of Dutty Rock, Paul has acknowledged the influence of earlier dancehall artists, including Super Cat and Shabba Ranks, recognizing that the album was built upon a foundation laid by predecessors within the genre. At the same time, he has reflected on the ongoing evolution of dancehall music, expressing pride in contemporary artists such as Shenseea and Skillibeng, and emphasizing the importance of maintaining the genre's authentic character while reaching global audiences.

== Track listing ==
2002 original release
No.	Title	Writer(s)	Producer(s)	Length
1.	"Dutty Rock Intro"			2:25
2.	"Shout (Street Respect)"	Sean Henriques; Lowell Dunbar	The Beat People	3:44
3.	"Gimme the Light"	Henriques; Troy Rami	Troyton	3:46
4.	"Like Glue"	Henriques; Tony "CD" Kelly	Kelly	3:54
5.	"Get Busy"	Henriques; Steven "Lenky" Marsden	Marsden	3:32
6.	"Top of the Game" (featuring Rahzel)	Henriques; Jeremy Harding; Richard Browne	Harding	4:05
7.	"Police Skit"			1:56
8.	"Ganja Breed" (featuring Chico)	Henriques; Delroy Foster; Patrick Walker	Foster	3:15
9.	"Concrete"	Henriques; Louis "Flabba" Malcolm; Mark Myrie	Malcolm	3:55
10.	"I'm Still in Love with You" (featuring Sasha)	Henriques; Alton Ellis; Clevie Browne; Wycliffe Johnson	Steely & Clevie	4:33
11.	"International Affair" (featuring Debi Nova)	Henriques; Nova; Mark Ronson	Ronson	3:49
12.	"Can You Do the Work" (featuring Ce'cile)	Henriques; Cecile Charlton; Harding	Harding	3:25
13.	"Punkie"	Henriques; Richard "Richie D" Martin	Martin	3:35
14.	"My Name"	Henriques; Andre "Suku" Gray; Donald Dennis; Iris James	The Shocking Vibes Team	3:40
15.	"Jukin' Punny"	Henriques; Andre "Rookie" Tyrell; J. Maraugh	Tyrell	2:02
16.	"Uptown Haters Skit"			1:25
17.	"Gimme the Light (Pass the Dro-Voisier Remix)" (featuring Busta Rhymes)	Henriques; Trevor Smith; Troy Rami	Troyton; Jigzagula^{[a]}; Murray Elias^{[a]}	3:21
18.	"Bubble" (featuring Fahrenheit)	Henriques; Chad Hugo; Pharrell Williams; Terrence Harold	The Neptunes	3:47
19.	"Shake That Thing"	Henriques; T. Rami	Roger Mackenzie; Troyton; Wesley Rami	3:54
20.	"Esa Loca" (featuring Tony Touch and R.O.B.B.)	Henriques; Harding; Joseph Hernandez; Robin Perez	Harding	3:47
21.	"It's On"	Henriques; Lloyd "King Jammy" James	James; Ward 21	3:39
22.	"Punkie (Espanol)"	Henriques; Martin	Martin	3:35

International bonus track
No.	Title	Writer(s)	Producer(s)	Length
23.	"Samfy I"	Henriques; Browne	Browne	2:52

2003 re-release
No.	Title	Writer(s)	Producer(s)	Length
1.	"Dutty Rock Intro"			2:25
2.	"Shout (Street Respect)"	Henriques; Dunbar	The Beat People	3:44
3.	"Gimme the Light"	Henriques; T. Rami	Troyton	3:46
4.	"Like Glue"	Henriques; Kelly	Kelly	3:54
5.	"Get Busy"	Henriques; Marsden	Marsden	3:32
6.	"Baby Boy" (Performed by Beyoncé featuring Sean Paul)	Henriques; Beyoncé Knowles; Scott Storch; Robert Waller; Shawn Carter	Storch; Beyoncé	4:05
7.	"Top of the Game" (featuring Rahzel)	Henriques; Jeremy Harding; Richard Browne	Harding	4:05
8.	"Ganja Breed" (featuring Chico)	Henriques; Foster; Walker	Foster	3:15
9.	"Concrete"	Henriques; Malcolm; Myrie	Malcolm	3:55
10.	"I'm Still in Love with You" (featuring Sasha)	Henriques; Ellis; C. Browne; W. Johnson	Steely & Clevie	4:33
11.	"International Affair" (featuring Debi Nova)	Henriques; Nova; Ronson	Ronson	3:49
12.	"Can You Do the Work" (featuring Ce'cile)	Henriques; Charlton; Harding	Harding	3:25
13.	"Punkie (Remix)" (featuring Tego Calderón)	Henriques; Martin; Calderón	Martin	3:35
14.	"My Name"	Henriques; Gray; Dennis; James	The Shocking Vibes Team	3:40
15.	"Jukin' Punny"	Henriques; Tyrell; Maraugh	Tyrell	2:02
16.	"Gimme the Light (Pass the Dro-Voisier Remix)" (featuring Busta Rhymes)	Henriques; Smith; T. Rami	Troyton; Jigzagula^{[a]}; Elias^{[a]}	3:21
17.	"Bubble" (featuring Fahrenheit)	Henriques; Hugo; Williams; Harold	The Neptunes	3:47
18.	"Shake That Thing"	Henriques; T. Rami	Mackenzie; Troyton; W. Rami	3:54
19.	"Esa Loca" (featuring Tony Touch and R.O.B.B.)	Henriques; Harding; Hernandez; Perez	Harding	3:47
20.	"Punkie (Espanol)"	Henriques; Martin	Martin	3:35

Notes

- ^{^[a]} signifies an additional producer

== Charts ==
=== Weekly charts ===
Chart (2002–2004)	Peak position
Australian Albums (ARIA)	22
Australian Urban Albums (ARIA)	4
Austrian Albums (Ö3 Austria)	5
Belgian Albums (Ultratop Flanders)	10
Belgian Albums (Ultratop Wallonia)	8
Canadian Albums (Billboard)	1
Canadian R&B Albums (Nielsen SoundScan)	1
Czech Albums (ČNS IFPI)	5
Danish Albums (Hitlisten)	18
Dutch Albums (Album Top 100)	7
Finnish Albums (Suomen virallinen lista)	11
French Albums (SNEP)	20
German Albums (Offizielle Top 100)	10
Hungarian Albums (MAHASZ)	22
Irish Albums (IRMA)	2
Italian Albums (FIMI)	7
Japanese Albums (Oricon)	49
New Zealand Albums (RMNZ)	5
Norwegian Albums (VG-lista)	4
Portuguese Albums (AFP)	27
Scottish Albums (OCC)	3
Spanish Albums (PROMUSICAE)	35
Swedish Albums (Sverigetopplistan)	5
Swiss Albums (Schweizer Hitparade)	11
UK Albums (OCC)	2
UK Album Downloads (OCC)	93
UK R&B Albums (OCC)	16
US Billboard 200	9
US Top R&B/Hip-Hop Albums (Billboard)	4
US Reggae Albums (Billboard)	1

=== Year-end charts ===
Chart (2002)	Position
Canadian R&B Albums (Nielsen SoundScan)	75
Canadian Rap Albums (Nielsen SoundScan)	37

Chart (2003)	Position
Austrian Albums (Ö3 Austria)	35
Belgian Albums (Ultratop Flanders)	50
Belgian Albums (Ultratop Wallonia)	55
Dutch Albums (Album Top 100)	16
French Albums (SNEP)	54
German Albums (Offizielle Top 100)	24
Hungarian Albums (MAHASZ)	70
New Zealand Albums (RMNZ)	46
Swedish Albums (Sverigetopplistan)	64
Swiss Albums (Schweizer Hitparade)	21
UK Albums (OCC)	21
US Billboard 200	21
US Top R&B/Hip-Hop Albums (Billboard)	6
Worldwide Albums (IFPI)	13

Chart (2004)	Position
French Albums (SNEP)	168
Swiss Albums (Schweizer Hitparade)	85
UK Albums (OCC)	145
US Billboard 200	158
US Top R&B/Hip-Hop Albums (Billboard)	75

== Certifications ==
Sales certifications for Dutty Rock
Region	Certification	Certified units/sales
Argentina (CAPIF)	Gold	20,000^{^}
Australia (ARIA)	Gold	35,000^{^}
Austria (IFPI Austria)	Gold	15,000^{*}
Canada (Music Canada)	3× Platinum	300,000^{^}
Denmark (IFPI Danmark)	Gold	25,000^{^}
France (SNEP)	2× Gold	249,000
Germany (BVMI)	Platinum	300,000^{^}
Japan (RIAJ)	Platinum	300,000
Mexico (AMPROFON)	Gold	75,000^{^}
Netherlands (NVPI)	Gold	40,000^{^}
New Zealand (RMNZ)	Platinum	15,000^{‡}
Norway (IFPI Norway)	Gold	20,000^{*}
Sweden (GLF)	Gold	30,000^{^}
Switzerland (IFPI Switzerland)	Platinum	40,000^{^}
United Kingdom (BPI)	3× Platinum	900,000^{‡}
United States (RIAA)	3× Platinum	2,700,000
Summaries
Europe (IFPI)	2× Platinum	2,000,000^{*}
^{*} Sales figures based on certification alone.^{^} Shipments figures based on certification alone.^{‡} Sales+streaming figures based on certification alone.
