= Stage One =

Studio album by Sean Paul
- Released: 28 March 2000
- Recorded: 1998–2000
- Genres: Dancehall, reggae, reggae fusion
- Length: 66:24
- Label: VP/Universal
- Producer: Jeremy Harding

Sean Paul chronology
Stage One (2000)	Dutty Rock (2002)

Singles from Stage One
- 1. "Deport Them" Released: September 22, 1998; 2. "Haffi Get De Gal Ha (Hot Gal Today)" Released: 2000

Professional ratings
Review scores
Source	Rating
Allmusic	2.5/5 stars

Stage One is the debut studio album by Jamaican dancehall musician Sean Paul. It was released on 28 March 2000. Putting the CD in a CD-ROM drive gives access to the "Haffi Get De Gal Ha (Hot Gal Today)" music video and a link to the 2 Hard Records website.

== Composition ==
Stage One features fellow Dutty Cup Crew member Looga Man, who collaborates on the tracks "Sound The Alarm" and "You Must Loose" while Mr. Vegas was featured on the single "Haffi Get De Gal Ya (Hot Gal Today)", "Tiger Bone" and the skit, "Nicky". The intro is performed by Tony Matterhorn whereas the outro is performed by Paul's brother, Jason Henriques (also known as Jigzagula). "Faded" is a take on Shania Twain's "You're Still the One". "Tiger Bone" featuring Mr. Vegas uses uncredited portions of the melody of Enrique Iglesias's "Bailamos" in the refrain.

== Track listing ==
No.	Title	Writer(s)	Producer(s)	Length
1.	"Mental Prelude" (performed by Tony Matterhorn)	D. Taylor, Craig Parkes	Jeremy Harding	0:48
2.	"She Want It"	Sean Henriques, C. Parkes	Craig Parkes, Jeremy Harding	2:56
3.	"Infiltrate"	S. Henriques, Jeremy Harding	Jeremy Harding, Matthew Katsikas	3:29
4.	"Nicky" (skit) (featuring Mr. Vegas)	Clifford Smith, S. Henriques	Jeremy Harding	1:24
5.	"Haffi Git Da Gal Ya (Hot Gal Today)" (featuring Mr. Vegas)	C. Smith, S. Henriques, W. Johnson, C. Browne	Steele & Clevie, Matthew Katsikas	3:16
6.	"Real Man"	S. Henriques, J. Harding	Jeremy Harding	3:07
7.	"Dutty Techniques" (skit)			0:29
8.	"Check It Deeply"	S. Henriques	C. Smith, B. Murray	3:35
9.	"Mek It Go So Den"	S. Henriques, Lloyd James Jr.	Lloyd James Jr.	3:25
10.	"Examples of Things Not To Do In Bed" (skit)			1:03
11.	"Deport Them"	S. Henriques, Anthony Kelly	Anthony Kelly	3:08
12.	"Tiger Bone" (featuring Mr. Vegas)	S. Henriques, C. Smith, Richard Browne	Richard Browne	2:52
13.	"Faded"	S. Henriques, A. Grey, S. Twain, L. James	Lloyd James, Ward 21	3:03
14.	"Definite"	S. Henriques, J. Harding	Jeremy Harding	3:10
15.	"Shineface" (skit)			0:34
16.	"Disrespect"	S. Henriques, A. Kelly	Tony Kelly, Matthew Katsikas	3:15
17.	"Sound the Alarm" (featuring Luga Man and Looga Man)	S. Henriques, Jason Henriques	Jason Herniques, Sean Henriques, Daniel Abbott	3:28
18.	"Uptowners" (skit)			1:03
19.	"No Bligh"	S. Henriques, A. Kelly	Donovan Germain	3:44
20.	"Slap Trap"	S. Henriques, W. Johnson, C. Browne	Steele & Clevie	3:17
21.	"Strategy"	S. Henriques, J. Harding	Jeremy Harding	3:24
22.	"A Word From the Hon. Minister" (skit)			0:20
23.	"Next Generation"	S. Henriques, Louis Malcolm, D. Foster	Louis Malcolm, D. Foster	3:43
24.	"You Must Loose" (featuring Luga Man)	S. Henriques, A. Daley	Jason Henriques, Sean Henriques, Daniel Abbott	3:26
25.	"Outro" (performed by Jigzagula)	C. Parkes	Jeremy Harding, Craig Parkes	0:47
26.	"Haffi Get De Gal Ya (Hot Gal Today) (Krotches Remix)" (featuring Mr. Vegas) (Hidden track)	C. Smith, H. Henriques, W. Johnson, C. Browne		3:37
Total length:				66:23

== Charts ==
Chart	Peak position
US Top R&B/Hip-Hop Albums	98
US Top Reggae Albums	2
