= Furnaceface =

Canadian punk rock band

- Origin: Ottawa, Ontario, Canada
- Genre: Indie rock
- Years active: 1989–1999
- Labels: Skull Duggery, Cargo Records
- Past members: Pat Banister; Martin Jones; Dave Dudley; Tom Stewart
- Website: http://eyevocal.ottawa-anime.org/furnaceface/

Furnaceface was a Canadian punk indie rock band formed in Ottawa, Ontario, Canada, which was active from 1989 to 2000. The group consisted of vocalist and guitarist Pat Banister, vocalist and bassist Slo' Tom Stewart, and drummer Dave Dudley. In 1993, Furnaceface won the Canadian Music Video Association Award for best independent video for "About to Drown" from Just Buy It., and another one a couple of years later for Best Editing for "How Happy Do You Want to Be?" from This Will Make You Happy.

== History ==
The band, formed in Ottawa in 1989, consisted of vocalist and guitarist Pat Banister, vocalist and bassist Slo' Tom Stewart and drummer Dave Dudley. Furnaceface evolved out of Fluid Waffle, which also included guitarist and vocalist Steve D'Annunzio. Furnaceface started playing shows late in 1989 and released their first single, "Sucked into Drugland," on Skull Duggery Records. After releasing this and the "New Pad" single, they toured across the U.S. and Canada. Their first full-length release was the Let It Down cassette, which was recorded by Andrew McKean, mixed by Marty Jones, and released in 1990. Jones recorded their second cassette in 1991, Just Buy It., and went on to engineer all the Furnaceface releases. After the first national tour for "Just Buy It" Jones (as "Smarty Moans") joined the group as a fourth member playing keyboard and guitar. After the original cassette version of Just Buy It. was released, Furnaceface signed to Cargo Records to release a remixed (by Bob Wiseman of Blue Rodeo fame) and re-sequenced version of the album on CD and cassette.

Furnaceface also released their next two albums, This Will Make You Happy (1994) and unsafe@anyspeed (1996), with Cargo. Around the time of Just Buy It.'s re-release, Furnaceface decided to start a festival, called Furnacefest, to promote local bands as well as larger acts. In 1995, after two years of performing with the group, Marty Jones decided to leave the band to concentrate on being a producer and co-running Sound of One Hand Studios. After Cargo Canada folded, Furnaceface would release a fifth and final album in 1999 titled And the Days are Short Again… on their own label Upright Records, which had the single "Heartless" on it. Around 1999, Pat Banister moved to Vancouver to work as an art director in the film industry. In Banister's absence, Dave Dudley and Tom Stewart have joined with Blake Jacobs of Hot Piss to create Manpower, who perform occasionally around Ottawa. The last Furnaceface recording released to date was 2000's Clobbering Time, a compilation CD of songs from their out-of-print pre-Days releases, from two songs from Let It Down released on CD at last to their cover of the Jam's "But I'm Different Now," the B-side of the "Biff, Bang, Pow!" single.

Other area musicians, including Ian Tamblyn and Jim Bryson have also contributed as guest musicians. During a live performance in 1997, Stewart received burns due to an onstage pyrotechnic effect; the show was halted but the musician made a full recovery with no scarring. Tom also performs occasionally as a country & western singer, under the name "Slo' Tom". His band, called Slo' Tom & The Horseshit Heroes (Jim Bryson, Dave Dudley, Geoff Taylor and Graham Collins) released an album, Liquor’s My Lover. He has since released four more albums, backed by a different band, called the Handsome Devils: Musta Been a Pretty Good Night (2013), I'm Sick (2014), Down in a Government Town (2017) and Doing Hard Time (2024).

== Music ==
Furnaceface's music includes everything from heavy riffs to classic pop as well as ska, punk, rockabilly, dance and 1960s garage.Their lyrics can be humorous, as in "I’m Getting Fat," and "Too Many Nuts." They also have lyrics that comment on local and global issues such as "Nobody to Vote For," a commentary on the 1993 Canadian federal election, and "We Love You, Tipper Gore" about the Parents Music Resource Center and the censorship debate in the 1980s.

== Videos ==
In 1993, Furnaceface won the Canadian Music Video Association Award for best independent video for "About to Drown" from Just Buy It., and another one a couple of years later for Best Editing for "This Will Make You Happy" (which Dave Dudley's daughter appears in) from This Will Make You Happy. The other videos they released were "I Don't Think," "She Thinks She's Fat," "If You Love Her (Would You Buy Her a Gun?)", "Slip & Stumble" (shot in the rough waves of various beaches in Cabo San Lucas, Mexico) "Biff, Bang, Pow!" (a cover of the Creation song), "Ode to Grant Hart" and "Heartless." They also made a video for "In Love with the Lie," but only released it in RealMedia format on their now-defunct official website.

== Discography ==
=== Singles and EPs ===
- "Sucked into Drugland" 7" single (1990)
- "New Pad" 7" single (1990)
- "Nobody to Vote For" CD single (1993)
- "You Poison My Cup" 12" single (1995)
- "Overcome" 7" single (1995)
- "Biff, Bang, Pow!" 7" single (1997)

=== Albums ===
- Let it Down cassette (1991)
- Just Buy It. (cassette, 1992; CD, 1993)
- This Will Make You Happy CD (1994)
- unsafe@anyspeed CD/cassette (1996)
- And the Days Are Short Again... CD (1999)

=== Compilations ===
- Clobbering Time CD (compilation, 2000)

== See also ==
- Music of Canada
- Canadian rock
- List of Canadian musicians
- List of bands from Canada
- Category:Canadian musical groups
