= Make It Clap =

Single by Busta Rhymes featuring Sean Paul and Spliff Star

from the album It Ain't Safe No More...
- Released: October 14, 2002
- Recorded: 2002
- Studio: Soundtrack Studios (New York City)
- Genre: Reggae fusion; dancehall
- Label: Flipmode; J
- Songwriters: Trevor Smith; Sean Henriques; William Lewis; Ricardo Thomas
- Producer: Rick Rock

Busta Rhymes singles chronology
"Pass the Courvoisier, Part II" (2002)	"Make It Clap" (2002)	"I Know What You Want" (2003)

Sean Paul singles chronology
"Gimme the Light" (2002)	"Make It Clap" (2003)	"Get Busy" (2003)

Spliff Star singles chronology
"Make It Clap" (2002)

"Make It Clap" is the first single from Busta Rhymes' sixth studio album It Ain't Safe No More... The remix version was released on January 13, 2003 as the official single in place of the original, released on October 14, 2002. It features Sean Paul and Spliff Star. The single peaked at number 46 on the Billboard Hot 100.

== Music video ==
The music video takes place in a club. Other settings in the video include Busta Rhymes and Sean Paul in different outfits. Other scenes others have both them and Spliff Starr together in black jackets. The video also shows some dancehall dancers and strippers.

== Charts ==
=== Weekly charts ===
Weekly chart performance for "Make It Clap"
Chart (2002–2003)	Peak position
Australia (ARIA)	61
Australian Urban (ARIA)	16
Belgium (Ultratip Bubbling Under Flanders)	9
Canada (Nielsen SoundScan)	21
France (SNEP)	45
Germany (GfK)	50
Ireland (IRMA)	43
Netherlands (Dutch Top 40)	24
Netherlands (Single Top 100)	15
Scotland Singles (OCC)	30
UK Singles (OCC)	16
US Billboard Hot 100	46
US Hot R&B/Hip-Hop Songs (Billboard)	17
US Hot Rap Songs (Billboard)	14
US Rhythmic Airplay (Billboard)	29

=== Year-end charts ===
Year-end chart performance for "Make It Clap"
Chart (2002)	Position
Canada (Nielsen SoundScan)	108

Chart (2003)	Position
UK Urban (Music Week)	14
US Hot R&B/Hip-Hop Songs (Billboard)	62

== Release history ==
Release history and formats for "Make It Clap"
Region	Date	Format	Version	Label	Ref.
United States	October 14, 2002	Urban contemporary radio	Original	J	
—	October 22, 2002	CD	—	J	
Canada	November 26, 2002	CD	Original	J	
Germany	January 13, 2003	CD	—	J	
United Kingdom	January 27, 2003	Cassette; CD	—	Arista	
Canada	February 4, 2003	CD	Remix	J	
Australia	February 24, 2003	BMG	Remix	J	
