= JB (Canadian rapper) =

Canadian rapper

- Born: Toronto, Ontario, Canada
- Genres: Canadian hip-hop
- Occupation: Rapper
- Years active: 2000s

JB is a Canadian hip-hop musician from Toronto, Ontario. He is most noted as a two-time MuchMusic Video Award nominee for Best Rap Video, receiving nods at the 2008 MuchMusic Video Awards for "Fire in Ya Eyes" and at the 2009 MuchMusic Video Awards for "Move Your Body".
