= Birth Through Knowledge =

Canadian rap rock band

- Also known as: BTK
- Origin: Toronto, Canada
- Genres: Hip hop; rap rock
- Labels: Tommy Boy, Ignition Records,
- Members: Lo-Ki; Stone Groove; DJ Spinz; Adam Carlo; Sam Cino; Matt DeMatteo; Mighty AOR

Birth Through Knowledge (aka BTK) were a Canadian rap rock band best known for their 1998 single "Peppyrock." Core members of the group were DJs Stone Groove and Lo-Ki.

== History ==
The roots of BTK began with a chance meeting of Lo-Ki and Stone Groove on a subway in 1993. Their early musical influences were Afrika Bambaataa and Grandmaster Flash. The group independently released an EP titled Birth Through Knowledge in 1995.

BTK's single "Corncob Pipe" was included on the sampler disc that Korn released alongside Follow the Leader and they won the 1997 MuchMusic Best Independent Video Award for "Superchile" after the song had been in heavy rotation on the station. They became the first indie band to open the main-stage at Edgefest '97.

After signing to the now-defunct Ignition Records (an alternative rock label affiliated with Tommy Boy Records), BTK released their only full-length album, also titled Birth Thru Knowledge, in 1998. The album was an upbeat mixture of rap, hip hop and guitar work.

Also in 1998, BTK opened for Beastie Boys, Kid Rock, and played several dates with Our Lady Peace, including Summersault Festival in Shediac, New Brunswick. Drummer Matt DeMatteo left the band in 1998 to continue his work as a recording engineer.

They performed along with Alanis Morissette during her 1999 Junkie Tour. and performed in Toronto at the El Macombo. Also that year, their music video for "Peppyrock" was nominated for MuchMusic Best Video.

BTK was nominated for a Juno Award in 1999 in the Best Alternative Album category (ultimately losing to Rufus Wainwright). The band's last known performance was at the Warehouse in Toronto in December 1999.

After the group disbanded, DeMatteo worked for two recording studios and then opened Record High Productions in December 2000. Bassist Adam Carlo rejoined his brother in his previous thrash metal band Razor in 2002. Turntablist DJ Spinz continued as a DJ, served as art director for Sudden Def Recordings, became part-owner of the promotion company Soul in Motion. Drummer Sam Cino continued performing as a drummer with several Ontario groups.

== Members ==
- Lo-Ki (vocals)
- Stone Groove (vocals)
- DJ Spinz (turntables)
- Adam Carlo (bass)
- Sam Cino (drums, percussion)
- Matt DeMatteo (drums until 1998)
- Mighty AOR (drums 1998–1999)

== Discography ==
- Birth Through Knowledge (1995, EP), Ultra Vibe
- Birth Through Knowledge (1998), Ignition
- "Peppyrock" (1998), Ignition
