= Get Busy =

2003 single by Sean Paul

Single by Sean Paul

from the album Dutty Rock
- Language: Jamaican Patois; English
- Released: 27 January 2003
- Genre: Dancehall; hip-hop
- Length: 3:32
- Label: VP; Atlantic
- Songwriters: Sean Henriques; Steven Marsden
- Producer: Steven "Lenky" Marsden

Sean Paul singles chronology
"Make It Clap" (2003)	"Get Busy" (2003)	"Breathe" (2003)

Official video
- "Get Busy" on YouTube

"Get Busy" is a song by Jamaican dancehall singer Sean Paul, from his album Dutty Rock. The song was one of the many hits from the jumpy handclap riddim known as the Diwali Riddim, produced by then-newcomer Steven Marsden, and was the only song that never made the "Diwali" rhythm album on Greensleeves Records.

Paul described it as "mainly a party song. It's not all about smoking weed". Originally released as a 7-inch single in 1999, "Get Busy" was released internationally in 2003 and topped the US Billboard Hot 100 for three weeks that May. It also reached number one in Italy and the Netherlands, becoming a top-10 hit in an additional 11 countries. On 10 May 2003, the song was performed on Saturday Night Live.

== Composition ==
"Get Busy" is written in the key of F minor in common time with a tempo of 100 beats per minute. The song follows a chord progression of Fm−A♭–G–G♭.

== Remix ==
The official remix, "Get Busy (Clap Your Hands Now Remix)", features Fatman Scoop and the Crooklyn Clan, the remix uses the instrumental of Paul's previous single, "Gimme the Light", on the near end of the song.

In 2024, an official remix was released by Odd Mob, titled "Get Busy (Odd Mob Club Mix)". The remix was certified Gold by Australian Recording Industry Association (ARIA) in 2025.

== Music video ==
The video for "Get Busy" (directed by Little X) was shot in Woodbridge, Ontario, and released in February 2003. The video was also nominated for two MTV Video Music Awards for Best Dance Video and Best New Artist in 2003. The video shows people dancing to the song at a basement house party, with some partygoers banging on duct pipes until the homeowner comes down to warn them to stop the banging. At the end of the video Paul's brother Jason introduces a song, noting it as a brand new single, and Paul then sings part of "Like Glue". Shortly into the second song, renewed banging on the pipes leads the homeowner to come back down to the basement and declare the party over. Kardinal Offishall makes a cameo appearance in the video.

On 9 December 2002, 21-year-old Ramesh Christie, a man watching the video shoot, was shot and killed by unidentified assailants.

== Track listings ==
US 12-inch single

A1. "Get Busy" (album version) – 3:32
A2. "Get Busy" (Diwali Riddim instrumental) – 3:20
B1. "I'm Still in Love with You" (album version) – 4:32
B2. "I'm Still in Love with You" (instrumental) – 4:16

UK CD single

1. "Get Busy" (album version) – 3:31
2. "Get Busy" (instrumental) – 3:20
3. "Get Busy" (a cappella) – 3:43
4. "Get Busy" (video) – 4:27

UK 12-inch single

A1. "Get Busy" (album version) – 3:31
B1. "Get Busy" (instrumental) – 3:20
B2. "Get Busy" (a cappella) – 3:43

European CD single

1. "Get Busy" – 3:32
2. "Get Busy" (Diwali Riddim instrumental) – 3:20

German 12-inch single

A1. "Get Busy" (album version) – 3:31
A2. "Get Busy" (Diwali Riddim instrumental) – 3:20
A3. "Gimme the Light" (2Step Moabit Relick remix) – 3:53
A4. "Gimme the Light" (2Step Moabit Relick instrumental) – 3:53
B1. "Like Glue" (album version) – 3:53
B2. "Like Glue" (instrumental) – 4:01

Australian CD single

1. "Get Busy" (album version)
2. "Get Busy" (Diwali Riddim instrumental)
3. "Gimme the Light" (2Step Moabit Relick remix)
4. "Gimme the Light" (Nappy Doggout remix)

== Personnel ==
- Written by Steven Marsden and Sean Paul Henriques
- Mastered by Paul Shields
- Executive producers: Christopher Chin, Jeremy Harding, Murray Elias, and Sean Paul Henriques
- Produced by Steven "Lenky" Marsden
- Photography by William Richards
- Artwork by Floodzone Design

== Charts ==
=== Weekly charts ===
Chart (2003)	Peak position
Australia (ARIA)	4
Australian Urban (ARIA)	3
Austria (Ö3 Austria Top 40)	4
Belgium (Ultratop 50 Flanders)	3
Belgium (Ultratop 50 Wallonia)	3
Canada CHR (Nielsen BDS)	2
Colombia (Notimex)	4
Czech Republic (IFPI)	9
Denmark (Tracklisten)	4
Europe (Eurochart Hot 100)	3
Finland (Suomen virallinen lista)	17
France (SNEP)	8
Germany (GfK)	3
Hungary (Dance Top 40)	1
Hungary (Rádiós Top 40)	17
Hungary (Single Top 40)	9
Ireland (IRMA)	14
Italy (FIMI)	1
Netherlands (Dutch Top 40)	1
Netherlands (Single Top 100)	1
New Zealand (Recorded Music NZ)	19
Norway (VG-lista)	2
Romania (Romanian Top 100)	3
Scottish Singles Sales (Official Charts)	11
Sweden (Sverigetopplistan)	4
Switzerland (Schweizer Hitparade)	2
UK Singles (Official Charts)	4
UK Hip Hop/R&B (Official Charts)	2
US Billboard Hot 100	1
US Hot R&B/Hip-Hop Songs (Billboard)	1
US Hot Rap Songs (Billboard)	2
US Pop Airplay (Billboard)	3
US Rhythmic Airplay (Billboard)	1

=== Year-end charts ===
Chart (2003)	Position
Australia (ARIA)	45
Austria (Ö3 Austria Top 40)	19
Belgium (Ultratop 50 Flanders)	11
Belgium (Ultratop 50 Wallonia)	17
France (SNEP)	33
Germany (Media Control GfK)	15
Italy (FIMI)	4
Netherlands (Dutch Top 40)	21
Netherlands (Single Top 100)	13
Romania (Romanian Top 100)	36
Sweden (Hitlistan)	24
Switzerland (Schweizer Hitparade)	3
UK Singles (OCC)	64
UK Urban (Music Week)	21
US Billboard Hot 100	3
US Hot R&B/Hip-Hop Singles & Tracks (Billboard)	8
US Hot Rap Tracks (Billboard)	4
US Mainstream Top 40 (Billboard)	15
US Rhythmic Top 40 (Billboard)	14

=== Decade-end charts ===
Chart (2000–2009)	Position
Netherlands (Single Top 100)	97
US Billboard Hot 100	50

== Certifications ==
Region	Certification	Certified units/sales
Australia (ARIA)	Gold	35,000^{^}
Australia (ARIA) Odd Mob Club Mix	Platinum	70,000^{‡}
Austria (IFPI Austria)	Gold	15,000^{*}
Belgium (BRMA)	Gold	25,000^{*}
Canada (Music Canada)	2× Platinum	160,000^{‡}
Denmark (IFPI Danmark)	Gold	45,000^{‡}
France (SNEP)	Silver	125,000^{*}
Germany (BVMI)	Platinum	300,000^{‡}
Italy (FIMI)	Platinum	100,000^{‡}
Japan (RIAJ)	Gold	100,000^{*}
New Zealand (RMNZ)	2× Platinum	60,000^{‡}
Norway (IFPI Norway)	Platinum	10,000^{*}
Spain (Promusicae)	Gold	30,000^{‡}
Sweden (GLF)	Gold	15,000^{^}
Switzerland (IFPI Switzerland)	Gold	20,000^{^}
United Kingdom (BPI)	Platinum	504,000
United States (RIAA)	Platinum	1,000,000^{‡}
^{*} Sales figures based on certification alone.^{^} Shipments figures based on certification alone.^{‡} Sales+streaming figures based on certification alone.

== Release history ==
Region	Date	Format(s)	Label(s)	Ref.
United States	27 January 2003	Rhythmic contemporary; urban radio	VP; Atlantic	
United States	24 March 2003	Contemporary hit radio	VP; Atlantic	
United Kingdom	12 May 2003	12-inch vinyl; CD	VP; Atlantic	
Australia	9 June 2003	CD	VP; Atlantic	

== In popular culture ==
The song was used in the DANCE! Online online game, and in the game Dance Dance Revolution Extreme 2. The song's remix was played in the club scene of the 2003 film Grind. The song also briefly appeared in the season two episode of The Wire, Hot Shots. The song was used in DJ Hero 2. The song was featured in a scene from the 2004 film Chasing Liberty. An instrumental version of the song appeared on the 11th episode of the season 2 of The Office. The song was also played in a dance scene in the film Baby Mama. The song also featured in a scene in the season two episode of Bad Education.

== See also ==
- List of Billboard Hot 100 number-one singles of 2003
