= Private Party Collectors Edition =

Compilation album by Baby Blue Soundcrew
- Released: December 5, 2000 (Canada)
- Genre: Hip hop, R&B, Dancehall
- Length: 73:44
- Label: Universal Music Canada

Baby Blue Soundcrew chronology
Private Party Collectors Edition (2000)	Private Party Collectors Edition Vol. 2 (2001)

Professional ratings
Review scores
Source	Rating
Allmusic	3/5 stars

Private Party Collectors Edition is the debut compilation album of Canadian DJ group, Baby Blue Soundcrew, released on December 5, 2000. The album features 24 popular urban songs of 2000, including five original songs by Baby Blue Soundcrew. In Canada, the album was just shy of platinum status, selling just under 100,000 copies.

Music videos were released for "Money Jane", "Too Much", and "You've Changed". "Money Jane" and "Only Be in Love" were nominated for Juno Awards in 2001.

== Track listing ==
#	Title	Performer(s)	Featured guest(s)	Length
1.	"Intro"	Baby Blue Soundcrew		1:44
2.	"You Owe Me"	Nas	Ginuwine	3:35
3.	"What Chu Like"	Da Brat	Tyrese	3:12
4.	"Got to Get It"	Sisqó		2:45
5.	"Money Jane"	Baby Blue Soundcrew	Kardinal Offishall, Sean Paul, and Jully Black	3:12
6.	"Da Rockwilder"	Method Man & Redman		1:34
7.	"Get It on Tonite"	Montell Jordan	LL Cool J	3:37
8.	"Dancin' (Power mix)"	Guy		3:27
9.	"Everyday (Neptune's remix)"	Angie Stone		2:21
10.	"Still D.R.E."	Dr. Dre	Snoop Dogg	3:34
11.	"Too Much"	Baby Blue Soundcrew	Ghetto Concept	3:13
12.	"What's My Name"	DMX		4:03
13.	"Another Level"	Baby Cham	Bounty Killer	1:40
14.	"Check It Deeply"	Sean Paul		1:52
15.	"She's a Ho"	Mr. Vegas		2:01
16.	"Crazy Notion"	Beenie Man		2:54
17.	"I Need a Hot Girl"	Hot Boys		2:10
18.	"Back That Thang Up"	Juvenile	Mannie Fresh and Lil Wayne	2:45
19.	"Wobble Wobble"	504 Boyz		2:52
20.	"Sincerity"	Mary J. Blige	Nas and DMX	3:44
21.	"Only Be in Love"	Baby Blue Soundcrew	Glenn Lewis	4:04
22.	"Something to Love"	Baby Blue Soundcrew	Saukrates	3:59
23.	"Let's Ride"	Q-Tip		2:47
24.	"You've Changed"	Baby Blue Soundcrew	Ro Ro Dolla and Saukrates	3:10
25.	"Do It Again (Put Ya Hands Up)"	Jay-Z	Beanie Sigel and Amil	3:29

== Chart positions ==
Chart (2000)	Peak position
Canadian Albums Chart	7

=== Year-end ===
Chart (2000)	Position
Canadian Albums (Nielsen SoundScan)	117
