= Baby Blue Soundcrew =

Canadian DJ group

- Origin: Toronto, Ontario, Canada
- Genres: Canadian hip hop, R&B
- Occupation: Disc jockeys
- Years active: 1995–2002
- Label: Universal Music Canada
- Members: Kid Kut; KLC; C-Boogie; Singlefoot

Baby Blue Soundcrew was a Canadian DJ group from Toronto, Ontario, specializing in hip-hop and R&B music. The group was composed of Kid Kut, KLC, C-Boogie, and Singlefoot. They are notable for releasing two commercially successful compilation albums in 2000 and 2001.

== History ==
Kid Kut (Kevin Keith) and KLC became friends when they were kids, growing up in Toronto's west end. After high school, KLC attended the University of Windsor, and Kid Kut went to York University. Both had radio shows at their respective campus radio stations, and eventually decided to join forces. In 1993, Kid Kut joined Fresh Arts, a program that was run by the Toronto Arts Council. Many of Baby Blue Soundcrew's original members also joined the program, which was attended by future collaborators Kardinal Offishall and Jully Black, among others. In the 1990s, the group became well known in Toronto for their parties and mixtapes; they also performed at school dances. In 2000, the group were the official sound crew for the Toronto Raptors.

In 2000, the group released their first single, "Money Jane", which featured Kardinal Offishall, Jully Black, and Sean Paul. The single became popular in Canada, and won the 2001 MuchMusic Video Award for Best Rap Video. In December 2000, the group released their debut album Private Party Collectors Edition, which featured 25 popular urban songs of 2000, including five original songs by Baby Blue Soundcrew. The album nearly went platinum in Canada.

In 2001, the group received two Juno Award nominations for "Money Jane" and "Only Be in Love" (a collaboration with Glenn Lewis).

On June 26, 2001, Baby Blue Soundcrew released their second album, Private Party Collectors Edition Vol. 2. As with their debut album, this album featured popular urban songs of 2001, including four original songs. The album's lead single "Love 'Em All", featuring Choclair and Mr. Mims, was nominated for a MuchMusic Video Award for Best Video in 2001. The second single "The Day Before", featuring Jully Black and Baby Cham, was nominated for a Juno the following year. The album reached #11 on the Canadian Albums Chart and was certified gold by the CRIA in October 2001. That year, the group also released Baby Blue Soundcrew Presents: Urban Nostalgia, a compilation of classic hit songs.

== Discography ==
- Private Party Collectors Edition (2000)
- Private Party Collectors Edition Vol. 2 (2001)
- Baby Blue Soundcrew Presents: Urban Nostalgia (2001)

== Awards and nominations ==
2001

- Juno Award for Best Rap Recording – "Money Jane" (Nominated)
- Juno Award for Best R&B/Soul Recording – "Only Be in Love" (Nominated)
- MuchMusic Video Award for Best Rap Video and Best Video – "Money Jane" (Won; Best Rap Video)
- MuchMusic Video Award for Best Rap Video and Best Video – "Love 'Em All" (Nominated)

2002

- Juno Award for Best R&B/Soul Recording – "The Day Before" (Nominated)
