= MuchMusic Video Award for Best Rap Video =

The MuchMusic Video Awards presented an annual award for Best Rap Video from 1990 to 2018. After 2002, the award was branded as MuchVibe Best Rap Video, for MuchMusic's urban music spinoff channel.

== Winners and nominees ==
Year	Artist	Video	Ref
1990	Maestro Fresh-Wes	"Let Your Backbone Slide"	
1991	Dream Warriors	"My Definition of a Boombastic Jazz Style"	
1992	Organized Rhyme	"Check the O.R."	
1992	E.T.P.	"Respect Me"	
1992	Maestro Fresh Wes	"Nothing At All"	
1993	The Maximum Definitive	"Jungle Man"	
1994	Devon	"X Marks the Spot"	
1994	Rascalz	"Really Livin'	
1994	TBTBT	"One Track Mind"	
1994	B-Kool	"Gotta Get Over"	
1994	Graphidi Logic	"Can I Get a Yo"	
1995	k-os	"Musical Essence"	
1996	Saukrates	"Hate Runs Deep"	
1997	Rascalz	"Dreaded Fist"	
1997	Choclair	"What It Takes"	
1997	Motion	"Use What U Got"	
1997	Scales Empire	"Bright Lights, Big City"	
1997	Thrust	"Rage"	
1998	Rascalz feat. Choclair, Kardinal Offishall, Checkmate & Thrust	"Northern Touch"	
1998	Ghetto Concept	"Krazy World	
1998	Infinite	"360 Degrees"	
1998	Kardinal Offishall	"On wit da Show"	
1998	Michie Mee	"Covergirl"	
1999	Infinite	"Take a Look"	
1999	Ghetto Concept	"Precious Metals"	
1999	Maestro	"Stick to Your Vision"	
1999	Redlife feat. Saukrates	"Yagga Yaw Yaw"	
1999	2Rude feat. Saukrates & Pharoahe Monch	"Innovations"	
2000	Choclair	"Let's Ride"	
2000	Dream Warriors	"Breathe or Die"	
2000	Kardinal Offishall	"Husslin'"	
2000	Rascalz feat. Barrington Levy & K-os	"Top of the World"	
2000	Saukrates	"Money or Love"	
2001	Baby Blue Soundcrew feat. Kardinal Offishall, Sean Paul & Jully Black	"Money Jane"	
2001	Baby Blue Soundcrew feat. Choclair and Mr. Mims	"Love 'Em All"	
2001	Kardinal Offishall	"BaKardi Slang"	
2001	Mastermind	"Bump!"	
2001	Swollen Members	"Lady Venom"	
2002	Swollen Members feat. Moka Only	"Fuel Injected"	
2002	Choclair feat. Jully Black	"Light It Up"	
2002	Ghetto Concept feat. The 7 Bill$ Allstars	"Still Too Much"	
2002	Jelleestone	"Money, Pt. 1"	
2002	K-os	"Heaven Only Knows (Version 1)"	
2003	Swollen Members feat. Nelly Furtado	"Breath"	
2003	BrassMunk	"Big"	
2003	Dirty Circus (Sweatshop Union)	"The Truth We Speak"	
2003	k-os	"Superstarr"	
2003	Rascalz ft. Notch & Sazon Diamante	"Crazy World"	
2004	Jelleestone feat. Elephant Man	"Who Dat"	
2004	Choclair	"Skyline"	
2004	k-os	"Heaven Only Knows (Version 2)"	
2004	Tone Mason feat. Brassmunk, G. Stokes, Graph Nobel	"The Throwback"	
2004	Universal Soul	"Way Back in the Day"	
2005	k-os	"Man I Used to Be"	
2005	Choclair feat. Saukrates, Ro Dolla & Solitair	"Tell 'Em"	
2005	Masia One	"Split Second Time"	
2005	Massari feat. Loon	"Smile for Me"	
2005	Rochester aka Juice feat. Kolor Brown	"A New Day"	
2006	Classified	"No Mistakes"	
2006	Alias Donmillion	"Dirty Dot"	
2006	JDiggz	"Puush It Up"	
2006	Sweatshop Union	"Try"	
2006	Jelleestone feat. Nelly Furtado	"Friendamine"	
2007	Belly feat. Ginuwine	"Pressure"	
2007	Classified	"Find Out"	
2007	JDiggz	"Make It Hot"	
2007	k-os	"ELEctrik HeaT: the seekwiLL"	
2007	Point Blank	"Born and Raised in the Ghetto"	
2008	Belly feat. Mario Winans	"Ridin'"	
2008	Classified ft. Maestro & DJ IV	"Hard to Be Hip-Hop"	
2008	JB ft. The Game	"Fire in Ya Eyes"	
2008	JDiggz ft. Voyce	"Just Wanna Party"	
2008	Tru-Paz	"Hotel Hell"	
2009	Classified	"Anybody Listening"	
2009	Famous	"Ain't No Use"	
2009	JB feat. Ghetto Flex	"Move Your Body"	
2009	k-os	"4, 3, 2, 1"	
2009	Shad	"The Old Prince Still Lives at Home"	
2010	Drake feat. Trey Songz and Lil' Wayne	"Successful"	
2010	Belly feat. Snoop Dogg	"Hot Girl"	
2010	Classified	"Oh Canada"	
2010	k-os feat. Saukrates	"I Wish I Knew Natalie Portman"	
2010	Kardinal Offishall feat. Riley	"We Gon Go"	
2011	Classified	"That Ain't Classy"	
2011	Belly feat. Kobe	"Back Against the Wall"	
2011	K'naan	"Take a Minute"	
2011	P. Reign	"Call My Name"	
2011	Shad	"Rose Garden"	
2012	Drake feat. Lil' Wayne and Tyga	"The Motto"	
2012	A-Game	"Cool Boyz"	
2012	Classified feat. Kayo & Jim Cuddy	"The Hangover"	
2012	Harvey Stripes feat. Lloyd	"Come On"	
2012	K'naan ft. Nelly Furtado	"Is Anybody Out There"	
2013	Drake	"Started From the Bottom"	
2013	Classified ft. David Myles	"Inner Ninja"	
2013	k-os	"Nyce 2 Know Ya"	
2013	Madchild ft. Matt Brevner and Dutch Robinson	"Jitters"	
2013	SonReal & Rich Kidd	"Hometown"	
2014	Drake	"Worst Behavior"	
2014	Classified ft. B.o.B	"Higher"	
2014	D-Sisive	"Friend of Mine"	
2014	P. Reign ft. A$AP Rocky	"We Them"	
2014	SonReal	"Everywhere We Go"	
2015	P Reign feat. Drake & Future	"DnF"	
2015	Tory Lanez	"Henny in Hand"	
2015	Naturally Born Strangers	"No One Knows My Struggle"	
2015	John River	"Hope City II"	
2015	SonReal	"Preach"	
2016	Drake	"Hotline Bling"	
2016	Belly feat. The Weeknd	"Might Not"	
2016	Jazz Cartier	"The Valley/Dead or Alive"	
2016	John River	"Get Down"	
2016	SonReal	"Whoa Nilly"	
2017	Tasha the Amazon	"Picasso Leaning"	
2017	Jazz Cartier	"Red Alert / 100 Roses"	
2017	Sean Leon	"81"	
2017	TassNata (featuring Rich Kidd & Tona)	"Let's Go"	
2017	Derek Wise	"Disconnected"	
