= Tanisha Scott =

Canadian choreographer

Tanisha Anyango Scott
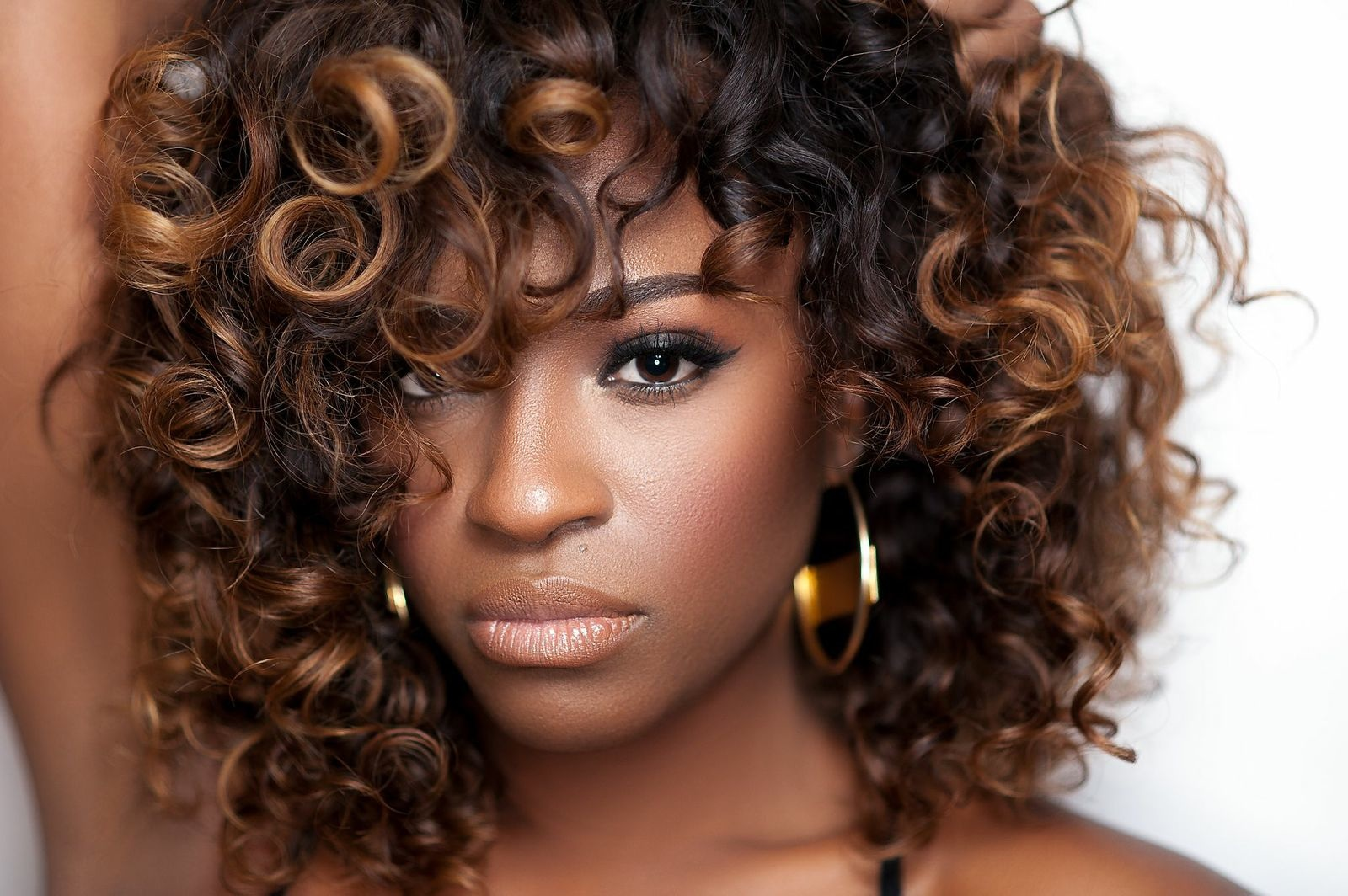
- Picture of choreographer Tanisha Scott
- Born: Tanisha Scott; Toronto, Ontario, Canada
- Occupations: Creative director, choreographer, dancer

Tanisha Scott (born in Toronto, Ontario) is a three-time MTV VMA-nominated choreographer best known for her work with Rihanna, Alicia Keys, Drake, Sean Paul and Beyoncé. She is noted for incorporating Jamaican dancehall moves into mainstream music.

== Early life ==
Tanisha Scott was born in Toronto, Ontario. Her entry to dance was greatly influenced by her Jamaican roots. Her father owned a sound system and that inspired her love of music and movement. While she was enrolled at the University of Windsor on a track scholarship, she joined the local hip-hop dance troupe Do Dat. Scott auditioned for a backup dancer slot on Mya's tour and was selected for the gig by Sho-Tyme, the singer's then-choreographer. Director Hype Williams booked Scott as a dancer for various videos early in her career, including a FUBU commercial featuring LL Cool J. She earned her first choreography credit for the Little X-directed video "Gimme the Light" for Sean Paul and continues as the artist's choreographer and creative director for tours and videos.

== Career ==
In 2003, Vibe magazine's Rob Kenner wrote that Scott's choreography for Sean Paul's "Gimme the Light" video "introduced the latest Jamaican dances to the MTV crowd." The next year, she was nominated for an MTV Video Music Award in the Best Choreography category for Sean Paul's "Like Glue." She was nominated again in 2006 for Sean Paul's "Temperature" and in 2007 for rapper Eve's "Tambourine."

In 2008, Billboard magazine included Scott in its 30 Under 30 list, noting that she was selected to choreograph Beyoncé’s “Baby Boy” music video following her earlier work with Sean Paul. She later worked with Beyoncé on the music videos of Upgrade U and Check on It.

Scott subsequently worked with Rihanna as a choreographer and movement coach. She contributed to Rihanna’s Loud Tour, which featured performances of songs such as Rude Boy, What's My Name?" and Man Down, and served as lead choreographer and movement coach for the music video We Found Love. She worked with the Rihanna during the Rated R, Loud and Talk That Talk albums and choreographed the "What's My Name," "Rude Boy" and "You Da One" videos in addition to choreographing Rihanna's tours. Scott took part in Rihanna's Countdown to TTT, a behind-the-scenes documentary that lead up to the Talk That Talk LP's release in November 2011. She also demonstrated dance moves in the Making of We Found Love documentary." Scott choreographed the videos for Whitney Houston's "I Look to You" and "Million Dollar Bill," Elephant Man's "Pon De River," Nas' "Bridging the Gap," and Amerie's "1 Thing." American Express profiled Scott in a 2015 commercial series. She danced with and choreographed the rapper Drake in his much lauded—and much parodied—video for 2015's "Hotline Bling." Rihanna assigned Scott to her ANTI World Tour and she appears in the singer's "Work" video.

=== Television ===
Scott was a coach for So You Think You Can Dance Canada and a featured guest choreographer on MTV's America's Best Dance Crew. During the ABDC segment, she tutored the 787 Crew on popular Jamaican dances such as the "Dutty Wine" and the "Chaplin" for a Dancehall-inspired performance on the show dubbed the "Rihanna Challenge," which was set to the singer's music.

=== Film ===
In addition to music videos and live performances, Scott creates movement for commercials, theater performances, films and television shows. She assisted the moves seen in Bring It On: All or Nothing .....(2006) and played a close friend of Rutina Wesley in the dance-based How She Move (2007). As a movement coach for Notorious (2009), the story of the late rapper The Notorious B.I.G., Scott helped Jamal Woolard, the lead actor, embody the physical movements of the title character Christopher "The Notorious B.I.G." Wallace. She was also an assistant choreographer on the set of Bride Wars (2009). In 2015, Scott choreographed the hip-hop throwback dance scene in Tina Fey and Amy Poehler's comedy Sisters. She's also responsible for dance moves in Netflix's The Unbreakable Kimmy Schmidt and coaching George Clooney through his first ever on-screen dance scene in Money Monster.

=== Theatre ===
In 2010, Scott co-choreographed Venice—a rap musical that parallels Shakespeare's Othello—with John Carrafa during her stint touring with Rihanna. Time magazine's Richard Zoglin called the dancing "fluid" in an article titled "The Year's Best Musical." The next year, she choreographed the Off-Off-Broadway play, This One Girl's Story.

Later in her career, Scott expanded her professional activities to include movement coaching and performance direction. She has provided guidance on movement and physical expression for staged and filmed performances and has been involved in coordinating movement and presentation for artists during live appearances.

=== Creative direction ===
As a creative director, Scott creates and constructs visuals and concepts for live shows and television. Scott choreographs, stages and organizes dancers, and coordinates with styling, lighting, production and set design teams to bring moments to life. Scott is best known for her work with Cardi B, who first brought her on as creative director in 2018. She also provides creative direction for singer, H.E.R.

== Awards and nominations ==
=== Grammy Awards ===
Year	Nominated work	Award	Result
2020	Lil Nas X feat. Billy Ray Cyrus "Old Town Road (Remix)"	Best Music Video	Won

=== MTV Video Music Awards ===
Year	Nominated work	Award	Result
2020	Coldplay "Orphans"	Best Rock Video	Won
2019	Cardi B "Money"	Best Hip Hop Video	Won
2019	Cardi B ft. Bruno Mars "Please Me"	Best Pop Video	Nominated
2019	Lil Nas X feat. Billy Ray Cyrus "Old Town Road (Remix)"	Video of the Year	Nominated
2019	Lil Nas X feat. Billy Ray Cyrus "Old Town Road (Remix)"	Best Hip Hop Video	Nominated
2016	***MTV Vanguard Performance - Rihanna	Excellence in Choreography	Nominated
2012	Rihanna "We Found Love"	Video of the Year	Won
2007	Eve "Tambourine"	Best Choreographer	Nominated
2006	Sean Paul "Temperature"	Best Choreographer	Nominated
2004	Sean Paul "Like Glue"	Best Choreographer	Nominated

=== Billboard Music Awards ===
Year	Nominated work	Award	Result
2019	Drake "In My Feelings"	Top Streaming Song (Video)	Won
