= Jeremy Harding =

British writer and journalist (born 1952)

- Born: 1952 (age 73–74); London, England
- Education: Wellington College; Magdalene College, Cambridge
- Occupations: Writer and journalist
- Notable credit: London Review of Books

Jeremy Harding (born 1952) is a British writer and journalist, based in the south of France. He is a contributing editor at London Review of Books. He is the author of books including Small Wars, Small Mercies (1993), The Uninvited: Refugees at the Rich Man's Gate (2000), Mother Country: Memoir of an Adopted Boy (2006), and Border Vigils: Keeping Migrants Out of the Rich World (2012).

== Life and work ==
Harding was born in London, England, where he was placed for adoption at 11 days old by his Irish mother. He grew up in West London. He tells the story of his adoption and the search for his biological mother in the book Mother Country: Memoir of an Adopted Boy (2006). He was later educated at Wellington College and Magdalene College, Cambridge, where he read English.

Harding is a contributing editor at the London Review of Books. He lives in France, an hour from Bordeaux, with his wife and three sons.

== Publications ==
=== Publications by Harding ===
- Small Wars, Small Mercies: Journeys in Africa's Disputed Nations. London: Penguin, 1993. ISBN 9780140134339.
  - The Fate of Africa: Trial by Fire. New York: Simon & Schuster, 1993. ISBN 9780671723590.
- The Uninvited: Refugees at the Rich Man's Gate (2000).
- Mother Country: Memoir of an Adopted Boy (2006).
- Border Vigils: Keeping Migrants Out of the Rich World (2012).
- Analogue Africa: Notes on the Anti-Colonial Imagination. London: Verso Books, 2026. ISBN 9781804295960.

=== Publications with contributions by Harding ===
- Arthur Rimbaud: Selected Poems and Letters. Penguin Classics. London: Penguin, 2004. ISBN 978-0140448023. Translated by Harding and John Sturrock.
