= Like Glue =

2003 single by Sean Paul

Single by Sean Paul

from the album Dutty Rock
- B-side: "Buy Out" (Jamaica); "Ignite It" (international)
- Released: 27 May 2003
- Genre: Dancehall
- Length: 3:53
- Label: K-Licious Music (Jamaica); VP, Atlantic (international)
- Songwriters: Sean Henriques; Anthony Kelly
- Producer: Tony "CD" Kelly

Sean Paul singles chronology
"Breathe" (2003)	"Like Glue" (2003)	"Baby Boy" (2003)

Music video
- "Like Glue" on YouTube

"Like Glue" is a song by Jamaican dancehall singer Sean Paul from his second album, Dutty Rock (2002). The song was produced by Tony "CD" Kelly, who co-wrote the song with Paul. Lyrics from "Like Glue" were originally intended to be the intro to "Gimme the Light" until Sean Paul expanded it and made it into a full song. Lyrically, the song refers to how Sean Paul does not care what people say and that he has to stick to his girlfriends "like glue".

Following the successful chart performances of "Gimme the Light" and "Get Busy", "Like Glue" was released worldwide on 27 May 2003 as the album's third single. It was distributed through K-Licious Music in Jamaica and through VP and Atlantic Records internationally. The single peaked at number 13 on the US Billboard Hot 100 and achieved success worldwide, becoming a top ten hit in Switzerland, the UK, Canada and Ireland. The song was listed as the 325th best song of the 2000s by Pitchfork.

The single's accompanying music video was directed by Benny Boom. The video earned Paul a Best International Artist Video award at the 2003 MuchMusic Video Awards.

== Background and video ==
When Sean Paul appeared on the music channel Flava, he revealed that the song was originally going to be the intro of "Gimme the Light" until he expanded on the lyrics. The song was originally released in 2001 as part of the "Buy Out" riddim, but became a hit on the strength of Sean Paul's popularity from "Gimme the Light". The song samples T.O.K.'s song "Money 2 Burn" from their album My Crew, My Dawgs. It also samples Notch’s song “Nuttin Nuh Go So”. According to AllMusic, the song is influenced by the song "Louie Louie".

The song has two censored words in the edited version: "Trees" in the chorus, when he says "Need a lot of trees up in my head", and "chronic" in verse 2, when he says "After a chronic, we take a drag", both referring to cannabis.

The music video was directed by Benny Boom, and instead of Sean Paul singing verse 3, Paul's brother Jason shouts out dances, and the dancers in the video perform them accordingly. The fourth verse is the repeat of the first verse. Also, there's a verse in Jamaican patois. The song is also played at the end of the "Get Busy" video.

This song is also featured on the soundtrack of the video game Midnight Club 3: DUB Edition. Ivy Queen's single from 2004, "Papi Te Quiero" samples "Like Glue" but blends a reggaeton beat produced by Rafi Mercenario. The English version of "Papi Te Quiero", however, features the original beat of "Like Glue". Both can be found on the platinum edition of Queen's third studio album Diva (2003).

== Reception ==
The song ranked 70th on About.com's list of the Top 100 Pop Songs of 2003. It was also listed as the 325th best song of the 2000s by Pitchfork. The music video won the 2003 MuchMusic Video Awards for Best International Artist Video.

== Track listings ==
Jamaican 7-inch single (2001)

A. "Like Glue"
B. "Buy Out"

US 12-inch single and UK 7-inch single

A. "Like Glue" (album version) – 3:53
B. "Like Glue" (instrumental) – 4:01

UK CD single

1. "Like Glue" (album version) – 3:53
2. "Get Busy" (Clap Your Hands Now remix featuring Fatman Scoop and Crooklyn Clan—amended radio short edit) – 3:50
3. "Ignite It" – 3:21
4. "Like Glue" (video) – 4:14

UK 12-inch single

A1. "Like Glue" (video version) – 4:14
A2. "Like Glue" (instrumental) – 4:01
B1. "Get Busy" (Clap Your Hands Now remix featuring Fatman Scoop and Crooklyn Clan—street club long version) – 4:18

European CD single

1. "Like Glue" (album version) – 3:53
2. "Get Busy" (Clap Your Hands Now remix featuring Fatman Scoop and Crooklyn Clan—amended radio short edit) – 3:50

Australian CD single

1. "Like Glue" (album version) – 3:53
2. "Get Busy" (Clap Your Hands Now remix featuring Fatman Scoop and Crooklyn Clan—amended radio short edit) – 3:50
3. "Ignite It" – 3:21

== Charts ==
=== Weekly charts ===
Chart (2003–2004)	Peak position
Australia (ARIA)	20
Australian Urban (ARIA)	8
Austria (Ö3 Austria Top 40)	17
Belgium (Ultratop 50 Flanders)	21
Belgium (Ultratop 50 Wallonia)	25
Canada (Nielsen SoundScan)	6
Canada CHR (Nielsen BDS)	10
Czech Republic (IFPI)	20
Denmark (Tracklisten)	20
Europe (Eurochart Hot 100)	11
Finland (Suomen virallinen lista)	17
France (SNEP)	31
Germany (GfK)	20
Hungary (Dance Top 40)	11
Hungary (Single Top 40)	1
Ireland (IRMA)	4
Italy (FIMI)	9
Netherlands (Dutch Top 40)	23
Netherlands (Single Top 100)	17
New Zealand (Recorded Music NZ)	18
Scottish Singles Sales (Official Charts)	8
Sweden (Sverigetopplistan)	13
Switzerland (Schweizer Hitparade)	6
UK Singles (Official Charts)	3
UK Hip Hop/R&B (Official Charts)	2
US Billboard Hot 100	13
US Hot R&B/Hip-Hop Songs (Billboard)	9
US Pop Airplay (Billboard)	29
US Rhythmic Airplay (Billboard)	10

=== Year-end charts ===
Chart (2003)	Position
Ireland (IRMA)	42
Italy (FIMI)	48
Switzerland (Schweizer Hitparade)	38
UK Singles (OCC)	88
UK Urban (Music Week)	39
US Billboard Hot 100	66
US Hot R&B/Hip-Hop Singles & Tracks (Billboard)	52
US Rhythmic Top 40 (Billboard)	52

== Certifications ==
Region	Certification	Certified units/sales
Canada (Music Canada)	Gold	5,000^{^}
United Kingdom (BPI)	Gold	400,000^{‡}
^{^} Shipments figures based on certification alone.^{‡} Sales+streaming figures based on certification alone.

== Release history ==
Region	Date	Format(s)	Label(s)	Ref.
United States	27 May 2003	Rhythmic contemporary; urban radio	VP; Atlantic	
United Kingdom	25 August 2003	7-inch vinyl; 12-inch vinyl; CD	VP; Atlantic	
Australia	29 September 2003	CD	VP; Atlantic	
