= T.O.K. =

Jamaican dancehall reggae group

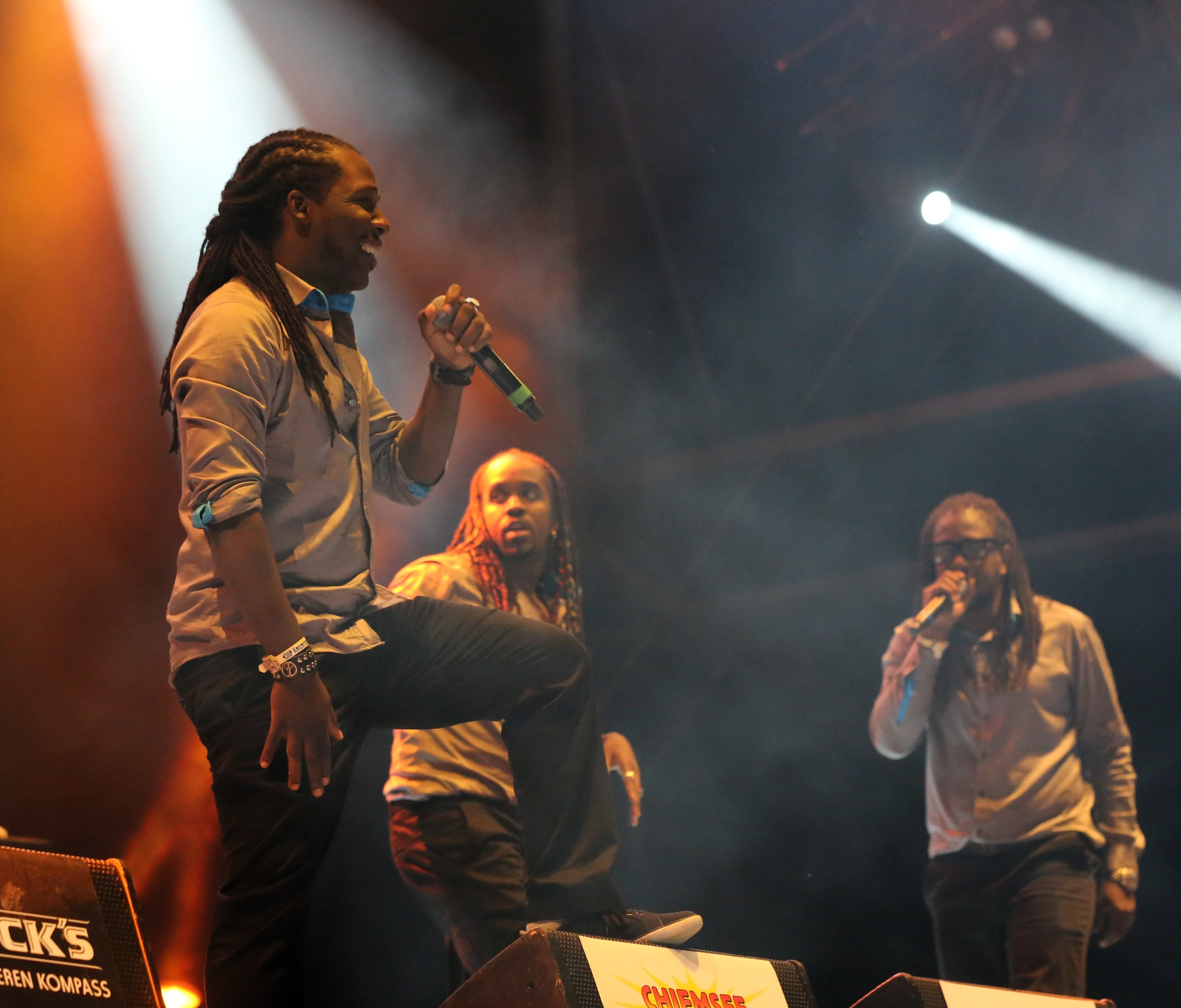
- T.O.K. at Chiemsee Reggae Summer 2013

Background information
- Origin: Kingston, Jamaica
- Genres: Reggae; dancehall; reggae fusion
- Years active: 1996–2015; 2022–present
- Labels: VP; X.C.A.R.R Records; JVC
- Members: Roshaun "Bay-C" Clarke; Craig "Craigy T" Thompson; Alistaire "Alex" McCalla; Xavier "Ja Flexx" Davidson

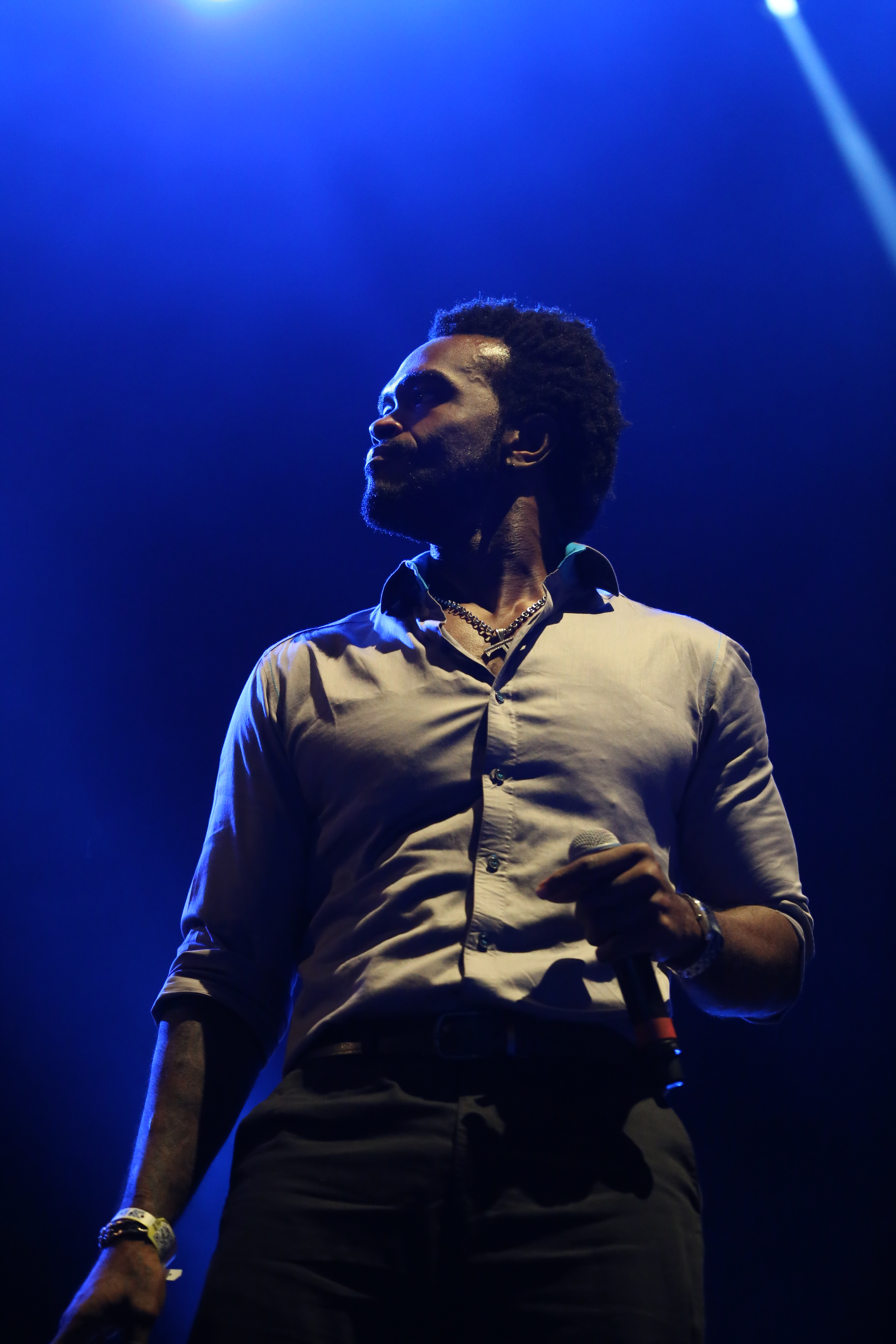
"Craigy T"

T.O.K. are a dancehall reggae group from Kingston, Jamaica. As of 2024, the group consists of Alistaire "Alex" McCalla, Roshaun "Bay-C" Clarke, Craig "Craigy T" Thompson, and Xavier "Flexx" Davidson (now known as Ja Flexx). They started their band in 1996, and announced its dissolution in 2015, before reuniting in 2022 and releasing a new song which would be the first after their reunion, titled "NPLH (Home)", featuring Shams the Producer. This song was released in 2023. T.O.K. were described as "the world's greatest dancehall-reggae boy band" by The New York Times in 2004. They were best known for such hits as "Wacky Dip", "Footprints", "Diamonds and Gold", "Gal You Ah Lead", "Chi Chi Man", "Eagles Cry", "Guardian Angel", "Money 2 Burn", "She's Hot", "Hey Ladies", "The Voice", "I Believe", "Shake Your Bam Bam" and "Galang Gal".

== History ==
=== Origins ===
The group's origins can be traced back to the early 1990s while the members were still attending school. Alistaire McCalla and Xavier Davidson were friends, and McCalla recruited Craig Thompson and Roshaun Clarke who were fellow members of the choir at Campion College in Kingston and T.O.K. was born.

After voicing some tracks for local record producer Stephen Greig's label Nuff Records, they signed a recording contract with Sly Dunbar and Robbie Shakespeare's Taxi label in 1996, and released their first single, "Hit Them High", which had little impact. Later that year, they signed onto Richard "Shams" Browne's High Profile label and released two more singles, "Send Them Come" and "Hardcore Lover" with Lady Saw. The latter tune was popular, climbing the Jamaican dancehall charts, and earned them a contract with VP Records. In 2012, the group became independent of their contract with VP Records.

=== Commercial success ===
Since emerging on the scene in the early 1990s, they released numerous hit songs and albums. In 1999, they recorded "Eagles Cry" (a version of Prince's "When Doves Cry") on the Jamaican imprint Xtra Large, which became an international success. "Eagles Cry" was followed closely by "Chi Chi Man", based on the "Sashi" riddim created by Tony "CD" Kelly and the christmas song Do You Hear What I Hear?. It was the Jamaican Labour Party's 2001 theme song, but came to be criticized for its homophobic lyrics (chi chi man being a slur for a gay man). T.O.K. entered the US market in 2001 with their debut album, My Crew, My Dawgs, which made the Top 10 in the Billboard Top Reggae Album Chart and achieved platinum status in Japan. That year, T.O.K. appeared on MTV's first Advance Warning. The group had a further success with the single "Gal You A Lead". The video was selected for MTV2's New Faces of MTV2, and was among Blender's "Top Songs of 2004". Produced by Bobby Konders, the single reached No. 85 in the US Billboard Hot 100.

Their second album, Unknown Language (2005) produced another hit "Footprints", also making it into the Billboard Chart at No. 93. The album followed its predecessor with platinum sales in Japan. T.O.K. spent a couple of years touring the world promoting Unknown Language.

In 2007, two more hits emerged in "No Man" and "Guardian Angel". "Guardian Angel" rose to No. 1 on the Reggae Charts in New York City and Florida as well as in Jamaica. Since 2008, T.O.K. released several new singles, as well as music videos for "No Man", "Unbelievable", the "Hotta Vybez Medley", "Raindrops Medley" and more recently "Supermodel".

=== Later years ===
In August 2009, their third album, Our World was released, with collaborations from Beenie Man and Kelly Price.

In 2013 the group collaborated with Major Lazer on the single "Shell It Down", which incorporated EDM.

The group's reality TV show, T.O.K.: Taking Over, was aired on CVM TV in July 2014.

The group were expected to release a new album (Taking Over) in 2015, their first since leaving VP Records.

=== Break-up ===
In October 2015, Davidson left because of internal issues within the group and decided to focus on a solo career, prompting the group to split up.

=== Criticism ===
T.O.K. was one of the musical acts that the Stop Murder Music campaign targeted due to their song "Chi Chi Man" containing lyrics which advocated for the killing of gay men. T.O.K. refused to sign the Reggae Compassion Act, but drafted and signed their own contract in August 2009 before their performance in Zürich called the T.O.K. Compassion Act. Their contract states "We respect and uphold the rights of all individuals to live without fear of hatred and violence due to their religion, sexual orientation, race, ethnicity or gender."

In February 2023, three members of T.O.K. – McCalla, Thompson, and Clarke – reunited to perform at the Big Yard Studio in Kingston, hosted by BBC Radio 1Xtra. The group did not perform "Chi Chi Man" during their set, despite calls from the audience and the hosts of the show. In an interview after the performance, Clarke explained the band’s choice not to include the song, saying, "Because we feel like the music should really unite people, we’ve made a decision to not perform the song, because we don’t want to offend any of our fans." However, in the days following this statement, bandmate Thompson defended the lyrics of "Chi Chi Man" and denounced Clarke's comment in a now-deleted Instagram post writing, "As for me, I don’t respect all sexual orientations. My respect is not contingent on anybody sexual orientation. As a matter of fact, I would prefer not to know sexual orientations."

== Members ==
- Xavier "Flexx" Davidson – vocals (1996–2015; 2022–present)
- Craig "Craigy T" Thompson – deejay, vocals (1996–2015; 2022–present)
- Alistaire "Alex" McCalla – vocals (1996–2015; 2022–present)
- Roshaun "Bay-C" Clarke – deejay, vocals (1996–2015; 2022–present)

== Discography ==
=== Albums ===
- My Crew, My Dawgs (2001)
- Unknown Language (2005)
- Our World (2009)

=== EPs ===
- Taking Over (2014), XCAR

=== DVD ===
- Blaze It Up Tour

=== Other albums from members ===
- D'Link (2008) – Flexx
- Bombrush Hour (2009) – Bay-C
