= Stage One International Film Festival =

Australian film festival

The Stage One International Film Festival is an annual Film Festival held in the Australian city of Gold Coast over one night in February. It was held for the first time in 2015. Films are showcased at Movie World on the Gold Coast. The program invites films for entry into three categories: General short films (Australia), general short films (rest of world) and Film Making: the One Shot Film.

== About ==
The Stage One International Film Festival held its inaugural festival in February 2015, the first film festival to be held at Warner Bros. Movie World. The festival showcased its first One Shot Film Project, made in 2014 by Queensland filmmakers, directed by Darwin Brooks and produced by Wade Boyes.

The Festival is a black tie event. A panel of celebrity judges judge the three categories for the winners. The founding purpose of the festival is to draw attention to and raise the profile of films by fostering and nurturing the development of cinema, boosting the film industry both on a local and national scale and celebrating cinema at an international level.
