= Gimme the Light =

2002 single by Sean Paul

Single by Sean Paul

from the album Dutty Rock
- B-side: "Can You Do the Work" (Liquid Riddim)
- Released: 9 September 2002
- Genre: Dancehall
- Length: 3:46; 3:20 (Pass the Dro-Voisier remix)
- Label: VP; Atlantic
- Songwriters: Sean Henriques; Troyton Rami
- Producer: Troyton Rami

Sean Paul singles chronology
"Money Jane" (2000)	"Gimme the Light" (2002)	"Make It Clap" (2002)

Music video
- "Gimme the Light" on YouTube

"Gimme the Light" is the first single from Jamaican dancehall musician Sean Paul's second studio album, Dutty Rock (2002). The song was originally released in Jamaica in 2001 as "Give Me the Light" and was issued internationally in 2002. "Gimme the Light" was Paul's first hit single, peaking at number seven on the US Billboard Hot 100 and becoming a top-20 hit in Canada, the Netherlands, and the United Kingdom. It is the most popular hit single from the "Buzz" riddim, which was the debut hit production for Troyton Rami & Roger Mackenzie a production duo of Black Shadow Records in Miami, Florida.

== Background and release ==
In 2001, a fledgling Miami-based Jamaican production team known as Black Shadow created a new dancehall riddim which they called "The Buzz". Of approximately 12 tracks that were vocalized by the latest stars and upcoming artists of dancehall, four of them became hits in the following year: Elephant Man's "Haters Wanna War", Cobra's "Press Trigger", Sizzla's "Pump Up", and Sean Paul's "Give Me the Light".

The unedited version of "Gimme the Light", as is the case with many Sean Paul releases, makes direct reference to smoking marijuana (in this case, passing along hydroponically grown marijuana, referred to as "the 'dro" in the song's chorus). The edited version of "Dutty Rock" contains the lyrics "Just gimme the light and start the show," instead of "pass the dro." Paul is also out clubbing and checking out women for a possible nightcap. References to marijuana were removed from the song for the edited version.

The official remix, "Gimme the Light (Pass the Dro-Voisier Remix)", features rapper Busta Rhymes. This version uses only the chorus from the original (the clean version also uses the unedited version's chorus), replaced by new lyrics from Paul and Busta, also of Jamaican heritage. The remix's name is referenced from Busta Rhymes' 2002 hit single, "Pass The Courvoisier, Part II". The song's instrumental was used for the remainder of the remix of Sean Paul's next single, "Get Busy", featuring Fatman Scoop.

In 2017, the song was included on Billboard's 12 Best Dancehall & Reggaeton Choruses of the 21st Century list at number three. In 2024, American rapper Ice Spice sampled the song in her single "Gimmie a Light".

== Music video ==
The music video was directed by Director X, known as Little X at the time. Features video vixen Pasha de Matas Bleasdell and choreographer Tanisha Scott.

== Track listings ==
CD maxi – US

1. "Gimme the Light" (Buzz Riddim)
2. "Gimme the Light" (Buzz Riddim instrumental)
3. "Can You Do the Work" (Liquid Riddim)

CD maxi – Europe

1. "Gimme the Light" (album version) – 3:46
2. "Gimme the Light" (Pass the Dro-Vosier remix) – 3:20
3. "Gimme the Light" (blackout remix) – 3:42
4. "Gimme the Light" (2Step Moabit relick remix) – 3:47

CD single

1. "Gimme the Light" (clean radio edit) – 3:47
2. "Gimme the Light" (Pass the Dro-Voisier remix - clean radio edit) – 3:20

12-inch maxi – US

1. "Gimme the Light" (original mix) – 3:46
2. "Gimme the Light" (instrumental version) – 2:50
3. "Gimme the Light" (Pass the Dro-Vosier remix - album / street mix) – 3:20
4. "Gimme the Light" (Pass the Dro-Vosier remix - clean radio edit) – 3:20

12-inch maxi – Europe

1. "Gimme the Light" (original mix) – 3:46
2. "Gimme the Light" (Pass the Dro-Vosier remix) – 3:20
3. "Gimme the Light" (heartless crew remix) – 4:45
4. "Gimme the Light" (heartless crew dub) – 4:45

CD maxi – Remixes

1. "Gimme the Light" (Pass the Dro-Vosier remix - clean radio edit) – 3:20
2. "Gimme the Light" (original mix - clean "Start the Show" radio edit) – 3:47
3. "Gimme the Light" (Pass the Dro-Vosier remix - album / street version) – 3:20
4. "Gimme the Light" (original mix - album version) – 3:46
5. "Gimme the Light" (instrumental version) – 2:49

== Charts ==
=== Weekly charts ===
2002–2003 weekly chart performance for "Gimme the Light"
Chart (2002–2003)	Peak position
Australia (ARIA)	89
Canada (Nielsen SoundScan)	11
Europe (Eurochart Hot 100)	15
France (SNEP)	43
Germany (GfK)	35
Netherlands (Dutch Top 40)	36
Netherlands (Single Top 100)	16
Scotland Singles (Official Charts)	23
Sweden (Sverigetopplistan)	34
Switzerland (Schweizer Hitparade)	19
UK Singles (Official Charts)	5
UK Indie (Official Charts)	4
UK Hip Hop/R&B (Official Charts)	3
US Billboard Hot 100	7
US Hot R&B/Hip-Hop Songs (Billboard)	3
US Hot Rap Songs (Billboard)	3
US Pop Airplay (Billboard)	26
US Rhythmic Airplay (Billboard)	4

2025 weekly chart performance for "Gimme the Light"
Chart (2012)	Peak position
Jamaica Airplay (JAMMS)	3

=== Year-end charts ===
2002 year-end chart performance for "Gimme the Light"
Chart (2002)	Position
Canada (Nielsen SoundScan)	45
US Billboard Hot 100	74
US Hot R&B/Hip-Hop Singles & Tracks (Billboard)	30
US Hot Rap Tracks (Billboard)	22
US Rhythmic Top 40 (Billboard)	78

2003 year-end chart performance for "Gimme the Light"
Chart (2003)	Position
UK Singles (OCC)	130
US Hot R&B/Hip-Hop Singles & Tracks (Billboard)	73
US Rhythmic Top 40 (Billboard)	69

== Certifications ==
Certifications and sales for "Gimme the Light"
Region	Certification	Certified units/sales
Canada (Music Canada)	Gold	5,000^{^}
United Kingdom (BPI)	Gold	400,000^{‡}
^{^} Shipments figures based on certification alone.^{‡} Sales+streaming figures based on certification alone.

== Release history ==
Release dates and formats for "Gimme the Light"
Region	Date	Format(s)	Label(s)	Ref.
Jamaica	2001	7-inch vinyl	Black Shadow	
United Kingdom	9 September 2002	CD	VP; Atlantic	
United States	21 October 2002	Contemporary hit radio	VP; Atlantic	
Australia	20 January 2003	CD	Warner Music Australia	
United Kingdom (re-release)	3 February 2003	CD; 12-inch vinyl	VP; Atlantic	
