= Reggae fusion =

Fusion genre of reggae

- Stylistic origins: Reggae; dub; dancehall; ska; rocksteady; lovers rock; rhythm and blues; pop; hip-hop; rock; jazz; funk; soul; disco; electronic; latin
- Cultural origins: Late 1970s – early 1980s, North America (especially Jamaica)
- Typical instruments: Bass guitar; drum kit; guitar; electric organ; brass instrument; melodica; sampler; synthesizer; drum machine

Subgenres
- Ska punk; reggae-pop; tropical house; skatech; reggae rock; dancehall-pop; moombahton; tropical pop; ragga jungle

Fusion genres
- Euro reggae

Other topics
- Music of Jamaica; list of artists

Reggae fusion is a fusion genre of reggae that mixes reggae and/or dancehall with other genres, such as pop, rock, hip-hop/rap, R&B, jazz, funk, soul, disco, electronic, and Latin music, amongst others.

== Origin ==
Artists have been mixing reggae with other genres from as early as the early 1970s, but initially they were described using terms that joined the various genres they performed (e.g. "reggae funk", "reggae pop", "reggae-disco"). It was not until the late 1990s that the term "reggae fusion" was coined.

The subgenre predominantly evolved from late 1980s and early 1990s dancehall music which instrumentals or "riddims" contained elements from the R&B and hip hop genres. Due to this, some consider dancehall artists such as Mad Cobra, Shabba Ranks, Super Cat, Buju Banton and Tony Rebel as pioneers of reggae fusion. For some of these artists, among them Buju Banton, reggae fusion became a staple throughout their careers. However, reggae fusion can be traced back to before the success of these artists, as far back as the late 1970s and early 1980s, with such songs as "Pass the Dutchie", and the band Third World blazed the trail, finding international success with songs such as "Now That We Found Love" and "Try Jah Love". Therefore, Third World can be seen as arguably the original pioneers of reggae fusion leading the way for groups such as UB40 and Steel Pulse.

Although there were a few recognized reggae fusion artists in the late 1980s to mid-1990s, including the aforementioned acts in addition to others such as Sublime, Maxi Priest, Shinehead, 311, First Light, the Police and Inner Circle, their style of fusing genres was subtly done. Artists such as Diana King, Patra, Buju Banton, Ini Kamoze, Snow and Shabba Ranks followed in their footsteps, however, creating a less subtle fusion by further blending heavier Jamaican dialect as well as more hardcore and sexual lyrics in their songs. This led to a lot of crossover success for these artists with songs such as "Informer" and "Here Comes the Hotstepper" reaching number one on the Billboard Hot 100, as well as topping charts all around the world. As the subgenre began to take shape, the mid- to late 1990s saw artists becoming more innovative as many began to mix genres that were not similar nor typically associated with reggae, such as techno and house, leading to the subgenre gaining a more distinctive following and really beginning to grow. Ironically, however, a major contributing factor to the subgenre garnering further international prominence was due to the lack of marketability of dancehall, especially in its rawest form, in the United States.

By the late 1990s, dancehall had lost its footing in the American market. While it was initially an appreciated novelty, it had gotten too hardcore lyrically. Further, vocalists started using even heavier Jamaican dialect and less standard English; this made it harder for a wider audience to understand what was being said. It had also come under heavy criticism from the international markets due to the homophobic lyrical content which sought to bash, condemn and instigate violence against the act as well as those who supported or participated in the lifestyle. This led dancehall artists who were trying to break into the U.S. market, to fuse the dancehall style of toasting or deejaying over softer and predominantly pop and hip hop instrumentals as well as to diversify the content of their songs while moving away from homophobic lyrics. Traditional dancehall acts, such as Shaggy and Beenie Man experienced commercial success in the American markets with the release of their albums in 2000. Shaggy had previously experienced multiple chart successes in the '90s but it was his album, Hot Shot, that especially helped further propel the subgenre internationally, as his album spawned two number-one singles on the Billboard Hot 100, "It Wasn't Me" and "Angel". No Doubt's 2002 massive hit album Rock Steady, with worldwide reggae fusion hits such as "Underneath it All" featuring Lady Saw and "Hey Baby" featuring Bounty Killer, further propelled the subgenre's popularity to new heights. This was especially because it marked one of the first times a pop/ska punk act had made a complete reggae fusion album since the mid-'90s and opened up the genre to a new fan base as reggae fusion was, at that point, mainly utilized by reggae artists trying to break into the mainstream market and not by already established acts, such as No Doubt. The early 2000s also saw Sean Paul achieve tremendous success internationally with singles such as "Baby Boy", "Breathe", "Like Glue" and "Make It Clap", among many others. His albums Dutty Rock and The Trinity altogether spawned five top 10 Billboard Hot 100 hits between 2002 and 2006, including the number-one hits "Get Busy" and "Temperature".

== Notable Artists ==
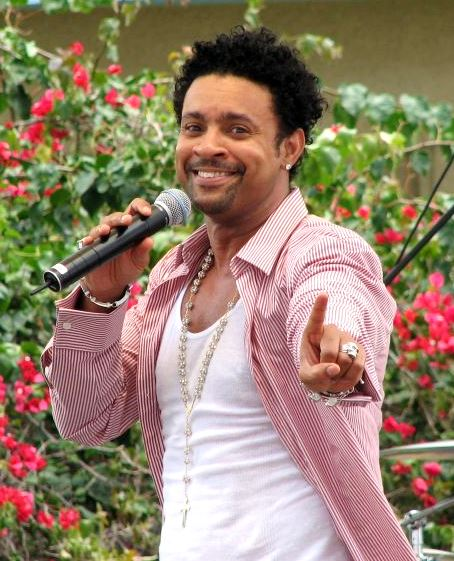
Shaggy, one of the most successful reggae fusion artists.

Shaggy helped bring reggae fusion to mainstream audiences in the early 2000s with hits like "It Wasn’t Me" and "Angel"...

Notable Reggae Fusion Hits
Artist	Song	Year	Chart performance
Ini Kamoze	"Here Comes the Hotstepper"	1994	Billboard Hot 100 – #1
Shaggy ft. RikRok	"It Wasn’t Me"	2000	Billboard Hot 100 – #1
Sean Paul	"Get Busy"	2003	Billboard Hot 100 – #1
Damian Marley	"Welcome to Jamrock"	2005	US Hot R&B/Hip-Hop – #55
Rihanna ft. Drake	"Work"	2016	Billboard Hot 100 – #1
Major Lazer ft. MØ & DJ Snake	"Lean On"	2015	Billboard Hot 100 – #4
Koffee	"Toast"	2018	UK Official Singles – Top 75

== Euro reggae ==
In the early 1990s, the evolution of reggae fusion reached another musical style in Europe with the worldwide number-one hits "All That She Wants", "The Sign", "Happy Nation" and "Don't Turn Around" by Ace of Base. Eurodance artists such as Dr. Alban, Dreamhouse, E-Rotic and the Vengaboys also regularly fused their style with reggae. The sound was often called Euro reggae and became a trend of Eurodance music, including such songs as Mr. President's "Coco Jamboo", Tatjana's "Sweet Sweet Smile", E-Rotic's "Help Me Dr. Dick", Rollergirl's "Ole Ole Singin' Ole Ola", Garcia's "Bamboleo", Maribel Gonzalez (M:G)'s "If You Think", DJ BoBo's "It's My Life", T-Spoon's "Sex on the Beach" and Vengaboys' "We're Going to Ibiza" and "Uncle John from Jamaica".

== Growth in Jamaica ==
The first reggae fusion-influenced riddim was produced in 2005 by Cordell "Skatta" Burrell, which featured deejays on a techno-based instrumental. Reggae fusion is now a regular staple on Jamaican radio stations, especially Zip 103 FM, in the form of singles, mixes and remixes. This has led to more reggae fusion hits being produced as well as making strong waves on the dancehall charts in Jamaica. One such single, "Ramping Shop" (using the same instrumental of Ne-Yo's "Miss Independent") by Vybz Kartel and Spice, was one of the biggest reggae fusion hits in 2008, not to mention one of the top singles in Jamaica of that year, peaking at number one.

Its continued exposure to Jamaicans became very evident in 2009, as the summer saw an explosion of Jamaican-produced reggae fusion riddims such as "Mood Swing" (which yielded the massive breakout number-one hit "Life" by G-Whizz) and hit tracks such as "Holiday" by Ding Dong and "(From Mawning) Never Change" by Chino. Both of these songs reached the top five on the Jamaican charts, with the former track peaking at number one in December 2009 and both (along with "Life") being nominated for "Song of the Year" at the 2010 EME Music Awards (Jamaican equivalent to the Grammy Awards), which was won by "Holiday". This marked the first time a reggae fusion song had won the prestigious award since the award show's conception in 2008 as well as the first time three reggae fusion songs were nominated for the award. "Holiday" was also nominated and won for the "Best Collaboration". Since 2010, reggae fusion has become a regular component of dancehall music and is as popular as it has ever been, being incorporated in such riddims as the popular "One Day" riddim produced by Seanizzle.

In 2011, Shaggy established a reggae fusion record label called Ranch Entertainment. It was intended to be launched in the summer of 2012.

== Local criticism and praise ==
Its growth locally, however, has not come without its criticisms as some feel that the subgenre only serves to dilute the raw sound of reggae and their musical culture. This controversy was further heightened in 2012, during the Jamaica 50th anniversary campaign to celebrate the country's 50th year of independence, as two vastly different songs were recognized as 'Jamaica 50' campaign songs, one which was a reggae fusion song entitled "On a Mission" produced by Shaggy and the other a roots reggae song entitled "Find a Flag" written by Mikey Bennett. While "On a Mission" was recognized as the official anniversary song and was applauded by some, it received its fair share of negative feedback due to many questioning its inauthentic Jamaican sound. Popular dancehall artist Mr. Vegas spoke out against the use of the song being quoted as saying: "It doesn't represent Jamaica 50, it doesn't reflect our culture or where our music is coming from." In 2014, following the growth of dance music in Jamaica, legendary reggae musician Richie Stephens sought to capitalize on this by launching a new riddim called 'Skatech' which was an amalgamation of Jamaican ska and electronic dance music. Stephens believed that due to ska not being at the forefront of Jamaican music for many years, combining it with something fresh could bring it back into the spotlight. This provided a different and positive counterargument to the criticism of reggae fusion in Jamaican music, as it was here being used to bring the original forms of reggae back into the limelight, not to drown it out or dilute it as critics would posit.

Drake was heavily criticized in 2016 from fans when it was realized that Popcaan's verse from "Controlla" was removed from the album version on Views, causing many to accuse him of cultural appropriation. Prior to the album's release, two tracks were leaked online, one of which was "Controlla" featuring Popcaan. When the album was released and it no longer featured Popcaan, many fans became irate. Popcaan, however, said he was happy for the exposure and understood that it was a business decision.

== Continued international popularity ==
Through other Caribbean-born artists such as Sean Paul, Damian Marley, Sean Kingston, Nicki Minaj and Rihanna who emerged during the mid-2000s, the popularity of the subgenre has continued to grow. International reggae fusion hits, such as "Calabria 2007" by Enur feat. Natasja Saad, "Need U Bad" by Jazmine Sullivan, "Say Hey (I Love You)" by Michael Franti & Spearhead featuring Cherine Anderson and "Billionaire" by Travis McCoy, show that the subgenre has matured and is as popular as it has ever been, with more artists experimenting with it. Jamaican singer Tessanne Chin is one of the latest reggae fusion artists reaching international fame following her winning Season 5 of NBC's reality TV singing competition The Voice as part of Adam Levine's team. Later in 2014, Canadian reggae fusion band, Magic!, scored a worldwide number-one hit with their single "Rude". It was the beginning of a major resurgence of the genre as this was followed later in 2015 by another number-one reggae fusion song when Jamaican artist OMI claimed the top spot with the Felix Jaehn remix to his song "Cheerleader". "Sorry" by Justin Bieber, "Work" by Rihanna, "One Dance" by Drake, "Cheap Thrills" by Sia, "Locked Away" by R. City, "All in My Head (Flex)" by Fifth Harmony, and in 2017 starting with "Shape of You" by Ed Sheeran also became international hits between late 2015 and early 2017 with all except "Locked Away" and "All in My Head" topping the Billboard Hot 100. R. City are known primarily for their songwriting and production many of which include reggae fusion tracks such as "Take You There" and "Replay", which they helped co-write. Other producers have also gained recognition for consistently incorporating reggae fusion into songs they produce, such as Major Lazer and J. R. Rotem, who has produced reggae fusion hits such as "Beautiful Girls", "Me Love", "Take You There", "Replay" and "Solo".

A new generation of musicians are largely to thank for the prominence of reggae fusion in the last few years. Dancehall music saw a decline on the international stage over the last decade but the genre is now seeing a resurgence back into the mainstream of music leading to many dancehall-inspired tracks. In 2016, a decade after Sean Paul's last triumph on the Billboard Hot 100, it was abundantly clear that larger audiences finally seemed receptive to this sound again. Coincidentally, Sean Paul himself, seemed to reemerge as a popular featured act as he was called up for guest appearances with pop artists such as Little Mix, Jay Sean, Enrique Iglesias and Sia, with his collaborations with the latter two, "Bailando" and "Cheap Thrills" respectively, becoming major international hits and "Cheap Thrills" becoming #1 on the Billboard Hot 100. Artists such as Meghan Trainor, Alicia Keys, Nico & Vinz, Calvin Harris, Ariana Grande, Twenty One Pilots, Clean Bandit and Britney Spears also made forays into the genre with songs "Better", "In Common", "Imagine", "My Way", "Side to Side", sleeper hit "Ride", "Rockabye" and "Slumber Party", respectively. Drake, however, has been an unlikely talisman of the genre beginning as early from his 2010 single, "Find Your Love" and culminating in his latest works, particularly his fourth mixtape If You're Reading This It's Too Late and his fourth studio album, Views, both of which feature heavy dancehall influences and popular dancehall acts such as Popcaan and reggae fusion singles "One Dance", "Controlla" and "Too Good". Fellow Canadian act Tory Lanez, whose parents are both from Caribbean islands, also had a major breakout in 2016 with "Luv", which sampled the late '90s dancehall classic "Everyone Falls in Love" by Tanto Metro and Devonte.

With the use of the dancehall's signature tempo on the albums of major music players such as Drake, Rihanna, Justin Bieber, Kanye West and more, the genre has become so popular that Apple Music started their own dancehall inspired playlist. This level of popularity has not been seen since Sean Paul followed in the path of Shaggy's crossover success and opened the flood gates for some of the Caribbean's brightest talents to find their way onto mainstream radio in the early 2000s.

Other major pop artistes continued to venture into the dancehall-pop genre in 2017 with Ed Sheeran, Katy Perry, and Calvin Harris, having hits with "Shape of You", "Chained to the Rhythm" and "Feels" respectively.

== See also ==
- List of reggae fusion artists
- Ragga
- Ragga jungle
- Fusion
- Tropical house
- Moombahton
