= Savage X Fenty =

Lingerie brand owned by Rihanna

- Logo
- Industry: Lingerie
- Founded: May 11, 2018
- Founder: Rihanna
- Headquarters: El Segundo, California
- Key people: Rihanna (CEO); Philippa Price (creative director)
- Products: Lingerie; bras; underwear; sleepwear; loungewear
- Parent: Lavender Lingerie, LLC
- Website: savagex.com

Savage X Fenty is a lingerie brand founded by Barbadian singer Rihanna. Along with lingerie, the line features bras, underwear, sleepwear, and loungewear. The brand features an optional membership program called Xtra VIP.

== History ==
Savage X Fenty is a joint venture between Rihanna and TechStyle Fashion Group. Starting as an online-only brand, the entire pre-launch marketing occurred on Rihanna’s Instagram account. The website launched on May 11, 2018, along with a pop-up shop in Brooklyn, New York, which was open the first two days the brand launched. Within a month of launching, the debut collection sold out.

In 2018, the company launched a sleepwear collection to benefit the Clara Lionel Foundation, a non-profit also founded by Rihanna.

Savage X Fenty was named one of Fast Company’s “10 most innovative style companies of 2020” and as of 2021, the brand is valued at $1 billion and has over 4.5 million followers across social media platforms.

In January 2022, Rihanna announced that Savage X Fenty would open its own brick-and-mortar stores in 2022. The first five locations planned are Las Vegas, Los Angeles, Houston, Philadelphia, and Washington, D.C.

In 2022, Savage X Fenty faced legal challenges over allegations of misleading business practices related to its paid VIP membership program. The brand, operated by Lavender Lingerie LLC, was accused of not clearly disclosing automatic charges associated with the VIP memberships, improperly obtaining customer consent for recurring payments, and falsely advertising the use of store credit. A lawsuit, filed by several California district attorneys' offices and the Santa Monica City Attorney, resulted in a $1.2 million settlement. Savage X Fenty agreed to pay $1 million in civil penalties, $150,000 in restitution, and $50,000 in investigative costs. The restitution was allocated to former and current California VIP members who were charged without clear consent. The company has since cooperated with authorities and implemented changes to its website, advertising practices, and automatic renewal notices.

== Models and collaborations ==
The company has a Savage X Ambassadors program consisting of celebrities, influencers, and micro-influencers. They all promote Savage X Fenty products on their social media platforms. Normani was named as the brand's first ambassador. Other ambassadors include Gigi Hadid, Bella Hadid, Rose Montoya, Kehlani, Rico Nasty, Gia Woods, Jackie Aina, Tamera McLaughlin, and Kash Doll. Many of these ambassadors have been included in the brand’s fashion shows.

== Fashion shows ==
Savage X Fenty’s first fashion show was at the 2018 New York Fashion Week with a live performance on the runway. Models, including Slick Woods, Indira Scott, Joan Smalls, Raisa Flowers, Bella Hadid, Gigi Hadid, and dancers were present at the show. They were all made up exclusively with Fenty Beauty products.

The brand’s second show was part of New York Fashion Week 2019 and doubled as a documentary called Savage X Fenty Show Vol. 1, which aired on Amazon Prime Video on September 20. The documentary shows the behind-the-scenes creative process of the new line, along with the performances on the runway. This fashion show featured musical performances from Rihanna, Big Sean, Migos, Halsey, DJ Khaled, A$AP Ferg, and more, and the runway consisted of models including Gigi and Bella Hadid, Cara Delevingne, Joan Smalls, and Slick Woods, and artists like 21 Savage and Normani.

Savage X Fenty Show Vol. 2 aired on October 2, 2020, and goes into the challenges of producing a show during a pandemic. Performers include Miguel, Rosalía, Bad Bunny, Mustard, Roddy Ricch, Ella Mai, and Travis Scott. Rihanna brought back many of the same models as previous years, but also included Lizzo, Chika, Paris Hilton, Willow Smith, and Rico Nasty on the runway. The show featured black breast cancer survivors as part of Breast Cancer Awareness Month and to benefit Clara Lionel Foundation.

Savage X Fenty Show Vol. 3 aired on September 24, 2021, and shows an immersive fashion experience that combines fashion, dance and music with notable architecture and extravagant performances. It combines the arts and portrays their pieces inclusively through this experience. Some of the performers featured in the show include Bia, Jazmine Sullivan, Ricky Martin, Erykah Badu, Nyjah Huston, Normani, Nas, Daddy Yankee, and more.

Every fashion show so far has been choreographed by Parris Goebel. The choreography is intended to inspire people to be themselves and love themselves for who they are.

== Impact on lingerie industry ==
According to Rihanna, she created Savage X Fenty with the goal of diversity in regards to size and color. According to the international B2B fashion platform FashionUnited, despite the brand not being the first to promote and call for more diversity in size and color, Rihanna's involvement helped give publicity to the brand itself, which popularized the idea of inclusivity.

== Controversies ==
In 2021, a Legal Rights Observatory activist filed a complaint against Savage X Fenty, alleging the brand was using child labor to extract blood mica from mines in Jharkhand, India. Savage X Fenty has denied these accusations.

The brand faced controversies relating to its membership program, in which a consumer protection was filed and settled for $1.2 Million for deceptive marketing. Some of the claims include a complaint about the advertisement of the prices (the real prices were hidden, and the shown prices were only accessible after subscribing to the optional VIP membership). Additionally, consumers felt misled by the subscription system, and they claimed that the company did not inform its customers of the recurring fees, nor did it allow them to consent to the automatic renewal of the membership.

== Investments ==
In 2022, Multiply Group PJSC, an Abu Dhabi based technology investment holding company, invested US$25 million in Savage X Fenty.

== See also ==
- Savage X Fenty Show
