= Anais Mali =

French model (born 1991)

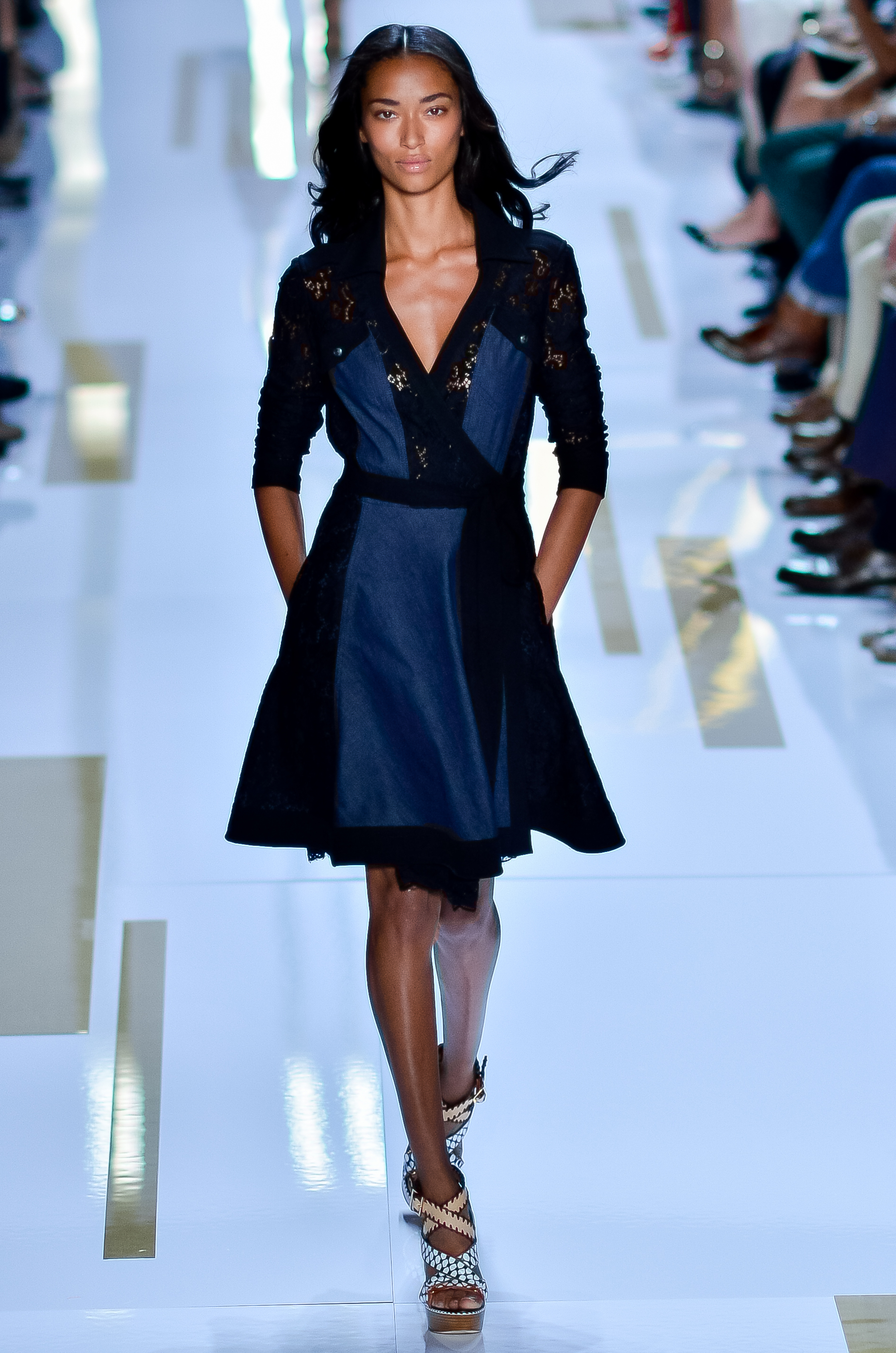
- Mali at the 2014 New York Fashion Week
- Born: 22 January 1991 (age 35); Toulon, France
- Occupation: Model
- Modeling information
- Height: 1.75 m (5 ft 9 in)
- Hair color: Brown
- Eye color: Brown
- Agency: Next Model Management (worldwide)

Anais Mokngar Mali (born 22 January 1991) is a French model. She has modeled and walked the runway for fashion brands such as Marc Jacobs, Vera Wang, and Derek Lam.

== Early life ==
Anais Mokngar Mali was born in Toulon on 22 January 1991, the daughter of a Chadian mother and a Polish father.

== Career ==
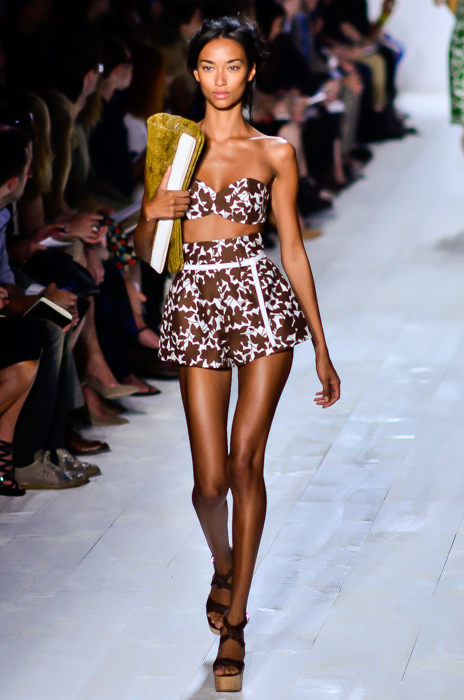
Mali on the runway for Michael Kors, S/S 2014 during New York Fashion Week

In 2009, Mali signed with Wilhelmina Models.

In July 2010, style.it featured Mali and proclaimed her as "a face to watch."

In 2010 she left Wilhelmina Models and signed with Ford Models. In December 2010, she appeared in an Interview editorial alongside Melodie Monrose.

In January 2011, she appeared in an Italian Vogue editorial photographed by Steven Meisel. In February 2011, she appeared in a Vogue editorial, photographed by Mario Testino. In May 2011, she appeared in editorials for Harper's Bazaar, American, French, and Italian Vogue, V, and i-D, photographed by Richard Bush.

In June 2016, she appeared in a Vogue Nippon editorial titled "Anais Goes Glam", shot by Giampaolo Sgura. In November 2016, she appeared in The Weeknd's video Mania. The next year she collaborated with designer Urivaldo Lopes to develop and launch a line of bodysuits under the label Anaïs Bodysuits.

== Select modeling appearances ==
- 2009: L.A.M.B., Sophie Theallet, Betsey Johnson, Shiatzy Chen, Vivienne Westwood
- 2010: Catherine Malandrino, Cynthia Steffe, Rachel Roy, Walter shows, J.Crew, Zink,Marc Jacobs, Vera Wang, Derek Lam, Cynthia Rowley, and Carolina Herrera
- 2011: Victoria's Secret Fashion Show
