= Spy Games (TV series) =

Reality television series in the United States

- Genre: Reality competition
- Presented by: Mia Kang
- Judges: Douglas Laux; Evy Poumpouras; Erroll Southers
- Country of origin: United States
- Original language: English
- No. of seasons: 1
- No. of episodes: 8

Production
- Executive producers: Chris Coelen; John Saade; Eric Detwiler; Karrie Wolfe; David Burris; Andrew Wallace; Scott Teti
- Camera setup: Multiple
- Running time: 41–43 minutes
- Production company: Kinetic Content

Original release
- Network: Bravo
- Release: January 20 – March 9, 2020

Spy Games is a 2020 American reality competition television series that premiered on January 20, 2020, on Bravo. Hosted by Mia Kang, the series featured ten contestants compete for $100,000. The competition took inspiration from the World War II government program Station S, in which civilians were assessed and trained to be spies.

== Judges ==
- Douglas Laux: A former operations officer in the Central Intelligence Agency with nearly a decade of experience. In that capacity, Laux deployed several times to Afghanistan where he helped track and eliminate key terror targets; he was in the country during and after the death of Osama bin Laden. He also built numerous contacts within the country, becoming familiar with the different languages and cultures of Afghanistan. Near the end of his CIA career, Laux was sent to Syria to meet with members of the anti-Assad resistance of the country. In 2016, he published a memoir detailing his time in the CIA (Left of Boom).
- Evy Poumpouras: A former officer in the New York Police Department turned United States Secret Service agent. Poumpouras served on protective details for former President Barack Obama and former First Lady Michelle Obama. She investigated both financial and violent crimes and worked in the Secret Service's elite polygraph unit. She underwent training from the Department of Defense in lie detection, human behavior and cognitive influence. She also protected former Presidents Bill Clinton, George H.W. Bush and George W. Bush. She completed undergraduate studies at Hofstra University and holds graduate degrees from Argosy University and Columbia University Graduate School of Journalism. She is currently a journalist who has worked for CNN, MSNBC, ABC and NBC.
- Erroll Southers: A former FBI agent and scholar of national security. Southers completed undergraduate studies at Brown University and planned on becoming a doctor, but instead opted for a career in law enforcement, first joining the Santa Monica Police Department. He then served for four years in the FBI, working in counterterrorism, counterintelligence and served in SWAT. After leaving the FBI, he was appointed by former Governor of California Arnold Schwarzenegger to serve as the deputy director for critical infrastructure protection in the California Office of Homeland Security. In 2007, he was appointed chief of intelligence and counterterrorism for the Los Angeles World Airports (LAWA) Police Department, the nation's largest law enforcement agency dedicated solely to aviation. He holds a master's degree and PhD from the University of Southern California. He currently serves as a professor at the USC Price School of Public Policy, specializing in national security and how to combat extremism.

== Contestants ==
Name	Age	Hometown	Occupation	Placement
Dr. Mitch Abrams	47	New Jersey	Psychologist and Published Author	10th
Saif Kareem	35	Jacksonville, Florida	Translator and Personal Trainer	9th
Jessica Studnicky	33	Los Angeles, California	Cannabis Sales	8th
Charnel Wright	43	Orlando, Florida	Public Relations Strategist	7th
Nika Nour	28	Washington, D.C.	Video Game Executive	6th
Colin Hutzler	31	New York City, New York	Entrepreneur	5th
George Jackson	28	Long Beach, California	Luxury Event Marketing Consultant and Professional Driver	4th
Chelsey Mori	27	Hamilton, Ontario	Law Student	3rd
Christina Randall	35	Pensacola, Florida	Social Media Influencer	2nd
Brock Thompson	32	Los Angeles, California	Nursing Student	1st

== Contestant progress ==
Contestant	1	2	3	4	5	6	7	8
Brock	SAFE	SAFE	SAFE	TOP	TOP	SAFE	SAFE	WINNER
Christina	SAFE	TOP	SAFE	INT	SAFE	SAFE	TOP	RUNNER-UP
Chelsey	SAFE	SAFE	INT	SAFE	SAFE	INT	INT	ELIM
George	SAFE	SAFE	TOP	SAFE	SAFE	TOP	ELIM	
Colin	TOP	SAFE	SAFE	SAFE	INT	ELIM		
Nika	INT	SAFE	SAFE	SAFE	ELIM			
Charnel	SAFE	INT	SAFE	ELIM				
Jessica	SAFE	SAFE	ELIM					
Saif	SAFE	ELIM						
Mitch	ELIM							

The contestant received positive critiques and was ultimately declared the Top Performer in the mission by the Assessors
The contestant was brought in for further interrogation, and remained in the competition
The contestant was brought in for further interrogation, and dismissed and eliminated from the competition
The contestant was the runner-up in the competition
The contestant was the winner in the competition and won the $100,000 prize

== Episodes ==
No.	Title	Original release date	U.S. viewers (millions)
1	"Welcome to Spy Games"	January 20, 2020	0.41
The contestants are introduced to Doug, Evy, and Erroll at the Black Site for the beginning of the competition.: Mission: After an all-night rendezvous in the woods, attend a Gala event and acquire a guest's cellphone number without asking for it. Contestants are assessed to adapt to the mission after enduring a high-stress complication. The mission is over when the Gala event finishes, with or without collecting their intel.; After being dropped off in the neighbouring woods, the contestants are delivered their dossiers to gather information about their rivals, whereas Chelsey chose to not disclose about her personal life. When the group arrived at the Gala, Colin and Chelsey excelled in gathering phone numbers without being too noticeable. Nika initially gained a cell number, but chose to continue the mission. However, it was detrimental as she ended up creating a stir with another guest. Mitch and George both struggled to get their numbers, but Mitch's attempt at socializing by the bar led to photographs taken of him being posted on social media. After the mission is over, the contestants are debriefed by the Assessors at the Black Site. George was immediately questioned about his missing tie and dossier, which he left in the extraction vehicle. Colin's performance in the mission was highly praised as a textbook Grey Man and declared the Top Performer. The Assessors kept Mitch and Nika at the Black Site for further Interrogation to defend their poor performances. Mitch was dismissed because of the spectacle at the bar, and letting photographs be taken of him by unknown sources. Nika joined the rest of the contestants at the Safe House training facility for the night and awaited for the first Dead Drop in the morning. During the Dead Drop briefing, Chelsey discovered that Mitch had passed his dossier onto her, and that he was the contestant who works in a prison. While the group were briefing themselves, Nika noticed and subtly swiped Charnel's dossier.
2	"Locked In"	January 27, 2020	0.38
The first Dead Drop revealed the contestants' secrets, and when Charnel discovered that her dossier had disappeared, she started to turn the Safe House upside down to find it. A Network between Colin, Saif, Christina, Brock, and Nika formed, with Nika disclosing her possession of Charnel's dossier.: Training: A day-long Lockpicking masterclass with a former S.W.A.T commander in preparation for the next mission.; Continuing to search for her dossier, Charnel was approached by George for information of her secret. Lying that he had her dossier, Charnel revealed that she was known as Dr. Death at a former job. Realizing that she had been duped, Charnel reacted loudly and attempted to muscle George's dossier out of his hands to remove her information. Saif's prior history serving in the US Military led to his lack of hearing. Struggling throughout the masterclass to hear how he was doing while picking the test locks, he resigned for the night while the rest of the contestants continued to practice.: Mission: The contestants must pick a series of three different kinds of locks. First, the lock attaching themselves to piping. Second, after crawling through a tunnel of sewerage, a lock on a sewer grate. Lastly, a door lock while under intense water spraying down on them. The mission ends after an hour, regardless who completes the mission or not.; While Brock, Colin, and Nika blazed through the lockpicking course respectively, both Christina and Chelsey persevered to complete the mission in time. Both George and Saif had not escaped the sewer grate tunnel at the end of the mission. The Accessors decided that Christina's performance to stick out the water conditions at the Black Site mission had earned their respect and the Top Performer of the mission. Initially Saif and George's lackluster performance were criticized, but the Assessors also brought up Charnel's behaviour at the Safe House as a concern. In Interrogation, Saif and Charnel appealed to the Assessors that they were willing to refocus on the game, but it was Charnel's admittance to having a game strategy when returning to the Safe House that lead to Saif's dismissal.
3	"Breaking and Entering"	February 3, 2020	0.37
The Network having lost Saif, regrouped and tried to subtly return Charnel's dossier to reduce chaos in the Safe House. At the second Dead Drop, Christina received Saif's dossier. During Charnel's scrambling in the morning, Nika revealed to Jessica about the theft in front of Christina. Which lead to Christina deciding that she needed to form a new Network with some of the women in the house outside of the men and Nika.: Training: Situational Awareness masterclass with Douglas Laux.; Mission: Dividing into teams of four, the contestants must first tail the mission's Mark to their place of residence. Once the Mark has left their residence, each team has 15 minutes to infiltrate, find the secret room, download security footage, and extract themselves from the property without leaving a trace of their presence.; For being the Top Performer in the last mission, Christina was granted to sabotage a fellow contestant in the mission. She selected George as the only man she wasn't working with. The Sabotage meant that George's team (Charnel, Chelsey, Jessica and himself) had to find a hidden camera in the Mark's property before they could extract themselves out. Christina's team (Brock, Colin, Nika, and herself) began their mission with Brock and her tailing the Mark, however, they lost sight almost immediately and left Colin and Nika exposed near the Mark's property. When the second stage of the mission began, Christina rushed through the back door of the house and broke a zip tie booty trap on the door handles. Colin discovered the hidden door to the basement, with Nika downloading the security footage in time before the Mark returned. George's team saw Charnel designating herself to tail the Mark as she was already wearing jogging clothes. Once the Mark had been tailed and left their property, the team started infiltrating through a side window. George separated himself from the team to quickly find the hidden camera Sabotage, but the women struggled to find the secret room in the basement. Eventually while climbing back into the house, George found the secret door, and with Jessica's expertise, downloaded the files while Charnel and Chelsey kept watch. Upon returning to the Black Site for Assessment, George was named Top Performer by the Assessors for his calm demeanor throughout the mission and leadership skills in delegating the team inside the Mark's property. Charnel's work tailing the Mark as a jogger also was highly commended as well. On the other side, Christina and Brock's failed tailing, and Christina breaking the zip tie trap upon entering the property saw her group's efforts be dragged down. However, Chelsey and Jessica were brought into further Interrogation because Chelsey's performance in the mission was generally lackluster and her advice had caused a difference in the Mark's property after the team was extracted; and it had been revealed by the Assessors that Jessica had failed to download all the required files before extraction. While the Assessors deliberated, Jessica used the time to reveal to Chelsey that she was a former competitive fighter, Nika had stolen Charnel's dossier, and Christina had been lying about being the fighter. When the Accessors dismissed Jessica for being the reason why her team's mission was incomplete, she publicly stated to the Assessors that she'd give her dossier to Chelsey immediately.
4	"Dead Drop"	February 10, 2020	0.36
5	"Mind Over Matter"	February 17, 2020	0.32
6	"The Alias"	February 24, 2020	0.33
7	"Mind Games"	March 2, 2020	0.28
8	"The Final Mission"	March 9, 2020	0.30
