= Katie Moore =

Katie or Kate Moore may refer to:

- Katie Moore (singer-songwriter), Canadian singer-songwriter
- Katie Moore (model) (born 1997), American fashion model
- Kathleen Moore (1812–1899), American lighthouse keeper
- Kate Moore (composer) (born 1979), Australian composer
- Kate Gordon Moore (1878–1963), American psychologist
- Katy Moore, character on the American television series The Office
