= Savage X Fenty Show =

- Genre: Fashion
- Created by: Rihanna
- Starring: Rihanna
- Country of origin: United States
- Original language: English
- No. of seasons: 4
- No. of episodes: 4

Production
- Executive producers: Rihanna; Jay Brown; Jennifer Rosales; Keith Baptista; Jihye Song; Michael Antinoro; David Chamberlin
- Production locations: Brooklyn, NY; Los Angeles, CA
- Production companies: Fenty Films; Project; Endeavor Content

Original release
- Network: Amazon Prime Video
- Release: September 20, 2019 – present

Savage X Fenty Show is an annual American television special about the fashion show for Rihanna's lingerie brand Savage X Fenty, also featuring music performances. The first, non-televised event took place in Brooklyn during New York Fashion Week in 2018. The first television special premiered on September 20, 2019, Vol. 2 premiered on October 2, 2020, Vol. 3 premiered on September 24, 2021, and Vol. 4 premiered on November 9, 2022, all on Amazon Prime Video. Rihanna is the executive producer and creative director of Savage X Fenty Show.

Throughout the years, Savage X Fenty Show specials have won three Webby Awards, and received nominations from the Set Decorators Society of America Awards and the Art Directors Guild Awards. In 2022, it won the Primetime Emmy Award for Outstanding Choreography for Variety or Reality Programming for Parris Goebel's work on Vol. 3.

== History ==
In 2018, Rihanna launched a new lingerie line called Savage X Fenty. On September 12, 2018, the first Savage X Fenty Show took place at New York Fashion Week. Models included Bella Hadid, Gigi Hadid, Indira Scott, and Slick Woods. Harper's Bazaar called it "a celebration of racial diversity and body inclusivity." Savage x Fenty is a company that celebrates all body shapes and encourages confidence through women and men lingerie.

On September 10, 2019, the first special was filmed at Barclays Center in Brooklyn for New York Fashion Week, with a group of dancers choreographed by Parris Goebel. It featured Rihanna, along with supermodels Gigi Hadid, Bella Hadid, Cara Delevingne, and Joan Smalls, appearances by 21 Savage, Normani, Christian Combs, and Paloma Elsesser, and performances by Halsey, Migos, Big Sean, DJ Khaled, Fat Joe, Fabolous, Tierra Whack, and A$AP Ferg. London jeweller Vicki Sarge was commissioned to create the show's jewellery

Vol. 2 was filmed at the Los Angeles Convention Center and showcases Rihanna's Fall 2020 collection, and includes performances by Travis Scott, Miguel, Rosalía, Bad Bunny, Ella Mai, Mustard, and Roddy Ricch. Featured on the runway are Bella Hadid, Big Sean, Cara Delevingne, Christian Combs, Normani, Paloma Elsesser, Lizzo, Demi Moore, Gigi Goode, Irina Shayk, Laura Harrier, Paris Hilton, Rico Nasty, Ryan Garcia, Shea Couleé, Willow Smith, and Jaida Essence Hall, with dancers choreographed by Parris Goebel.

Vol. 3 was filmed at the Westin Bonaventure Hotel in Los Angeles and includes performances by Nas, Daddy Yankee, BIA, Jazmine Sullivan, Ricky Martin, Normani, and Jade Novah, and appearances from Adriana Lima, Alek Wek, Behati Prinsloo, Bella Poarch, Eartheater, Emily Ratajkowski, Erykah Badu, Gigi Hadid, Gottmik, Irina Shayk, Jeremy Pope, Joan Smalls, Jojo T. Gibbs, Leiomy, Lola Leon, Lucky Blue Smith, Mena Massoud, Nyjah Huston, Sabrina Carpenter, Soo Joo Park, Symone, Thuso Mbedu, Troye Sivan, Vanessa Hudgens, and Cindy Crawford.

For Vol. 4, Rihanna again serves as executive producer and creative director. It includes performances by Anitta, Burna Boy, Don Toliver, and Maxwell, and features Johnny Depp, Ángela Aguilar, Avani Gregg, Bella Poarch, Cara Delevingne, Damson Idris, Irina Shayk, Joan Smalls, Kornbread, Lara Stone, Lilly Singh, Marsai Martin, Precious Lee, Rickey Thompson, Sheryl Lee Ralph, Simu Liu, Taraji P. Henson, Taylour Paige, Winston Duke, and Zach Miko. Vol. 4 was filmed at Allied Studios presented by Prime Video on November 8, 2022, in Simi Valley, California. [32]

== Release ==
Savage X Fenty Show was released on Amazon Prime Video on September 20, 2019. A teaser for Savage X Fenty Show Vol. 2 was released on September 25, 2020, and it premiered on Prime Video on October 2, 2020. A teaser for Savage X Fenty Show Vol. 3 was released on August 26, 2021, and it premiered on Prime Video on September 24, 2021. A teaser for Savage X Fenty Show Vol. 4 was released on October 14, 2022, the trailer was released on November 3, 2022, and it premiered on Prime Video on November 9, 2022.

== Summary ==
#	Event	Dates	Location	Choreographer	Broadcaster	Models	Performers
1	Savage X Fenty Show (2018)	September 12, 2018	Brooklyn Navy Yard, Brooklyn, NY, U.S.	Parris Goebel	no broadcast	Bella Hadid; Gigi Hadid; Joan Smalls; Paloma Elsesser; Slick Woods; Indira Scott; Raisa Flowers; Fael Luna	none
2	Savage X Fenty Show (2019)	September 10, 2019	Barclays Center, Brooklyn, NY, U.S.	Parris Goebel	Prime Video	Rihanna; Bella Hadid; Gigi Hadid; Cara Delevingne; Laverne Cox; Joan Smalls; Normani; 21 Savage; Christian Combs; Paloma Elsesser; Alek Wek; Fael Luna	Halsey; Migos; Big Sean; A$AP Ferg; DJ Khaled; Fat Joe; Fabolous; Tierra Whack
3	Savage X Fenty Show Vol. 2 (2020)	Pre-filmed	Los Angeles Convention Center, Los Angeles, CA, U.S.	Parris Goebel	Prime Video	Rihanna; Bella Hadid; Demi Moore; Cara Delevingne; Jaida Essence Hall; Indya Moore; Normani; Lizzo; Adesuwa Aighewi; Jazzelle Zanaughtti; Paloma Elsesser; Irina Shayk; Laura Harrier; Soo Joo Park; Chika; Paris Hilton; Willow Smith; Jaren Merrell; Gigi Goode; Shea Couleé; Rico Nasty; Christian Combs; Big Sean; Fael Luna	Travis Scott; Rosalía; Mustard; Ella Mai; Roddy Ricch; Bad Bunny; Miguel
4	Savage X Fenty Show Vol. 3 (2021)	Pre-filmed	Westin Bonaventure Hotel, Los Angeles, CA, U.S.	Parris Goebel	Prime Video	Rihanna; Adriana Lima; AJ; Alek Wek; Angel; August Atkinson; Behati Prinsloo; Bella Poarch; Daniel Aguilera; Eartheater; Emily Ratajkowski; Erykah Badu; Gigi Hadid; Gottmik; Irina Shayk; Jeremy Pope; Joan Smalls; Jojo T. Gibbs; Leiomy; Lola Leon; Lucky Blue Smith; Mena Massoud; Mei Pang; Nyjah Huston; Precious Lee; Sabrina Carpenter; Soo Joo Park; Symone; Thuso Mbedu; Troye Sivan; Vanessa Hudgens; Cindy Crawford	Nas; Daddy Yankee; BIA; Jazmine Sullivan; Ricky Martin; Normani; Jade Novah; Fael Luna
5	Savage X Fenty Show Vol.4 (2022)	Pre-filmed	Simi Valley Ventura County, CA, U.S.	Parris Goebel	Prime Video	Rihanna; Ángela Aguilar; Avani Gregg; Bella Poarch; Cara Delevingne; Damson Idris; Irina Shayk; Joan Smalls; Johnny Depp; Kornbread; Lara Stone; Lilly Singh; Marsai Martin; Precious Lee; Rickey Thompson; Sheryl Lee Ralph; Simu Liu; Taraji P. Henson; Taylour Paige; Winston Duke; Zach Miko; Fael Luna	Anitta; Burna Boy; Don Toliver; Maxwell

== Accolades ==
Year	Award	Category	Recipient	Result	Ref(s)
2019	BreakTheInternet Awards	Fashion Moment Of The Year	Rihanna	Won	
2020	Primetime Creative Arts Emmy Awards	Outstanding Choreography for Variety or Reality Programming	Parris Goebel	Nominated	
2020	WOWIE Awards	Outstanding Fashion Show or Program	Rihanna	Won	
2021	Art Directors Guild Awards	Excellence in Production Design for a Variety Special	Steve Morden	Nominated	
2021	People's Choice Awards	The Pop Special of 2021	Savage X Fenty Show Vol. 3	Nominated	
2021	Primetime Creative Arts Emmy Awards	Outstanding Choreography for Variety or Reality Programming	Parris Goebel	Nominated	
2021	Webby Awards	Social: Events	Savage X Fenty Show	Won	
2021	Webby Awards	Social: Diversity & Inclusion	Savage X Fenty Show	Won	
2021	Webby Awards	Social: Performance & Dance	Savage X Fenty Show	Won	
2022	Primetime Emmy Awards	Outstanding Choreography for Variety or Reality Programming	Parris Goebel	Won	
2022	Primetime Emmy Awards	Outstanding Production Design for a Variety Special	Willo Perron, Steve Morden, and Marc Manabat	Nominated	
2022	Set Decorators Society of America Awards	Best Achievement in Décor/Design of a Variety Special	Vince Rodriguez and Steve Morden	Nominated	

== Controversy ==
Following the release of Vol. 2, Rihanna and music producer Coucou Chloe issued apologies to the Islamic community for the use of Chloe's song Doom in the show. The song includes lyrics taken from a Hadith, or sacred text containing sayings from the prophet Muhammad. Many Muslims criticized the use of the song for combining sacred texts with secular music and for its use in a lingerie show. Following the backlash, the Savage X Fenty brand issued an apology stating the show would be edited and the backing vocals of Doom would be replaced.
