= Ward 21 =

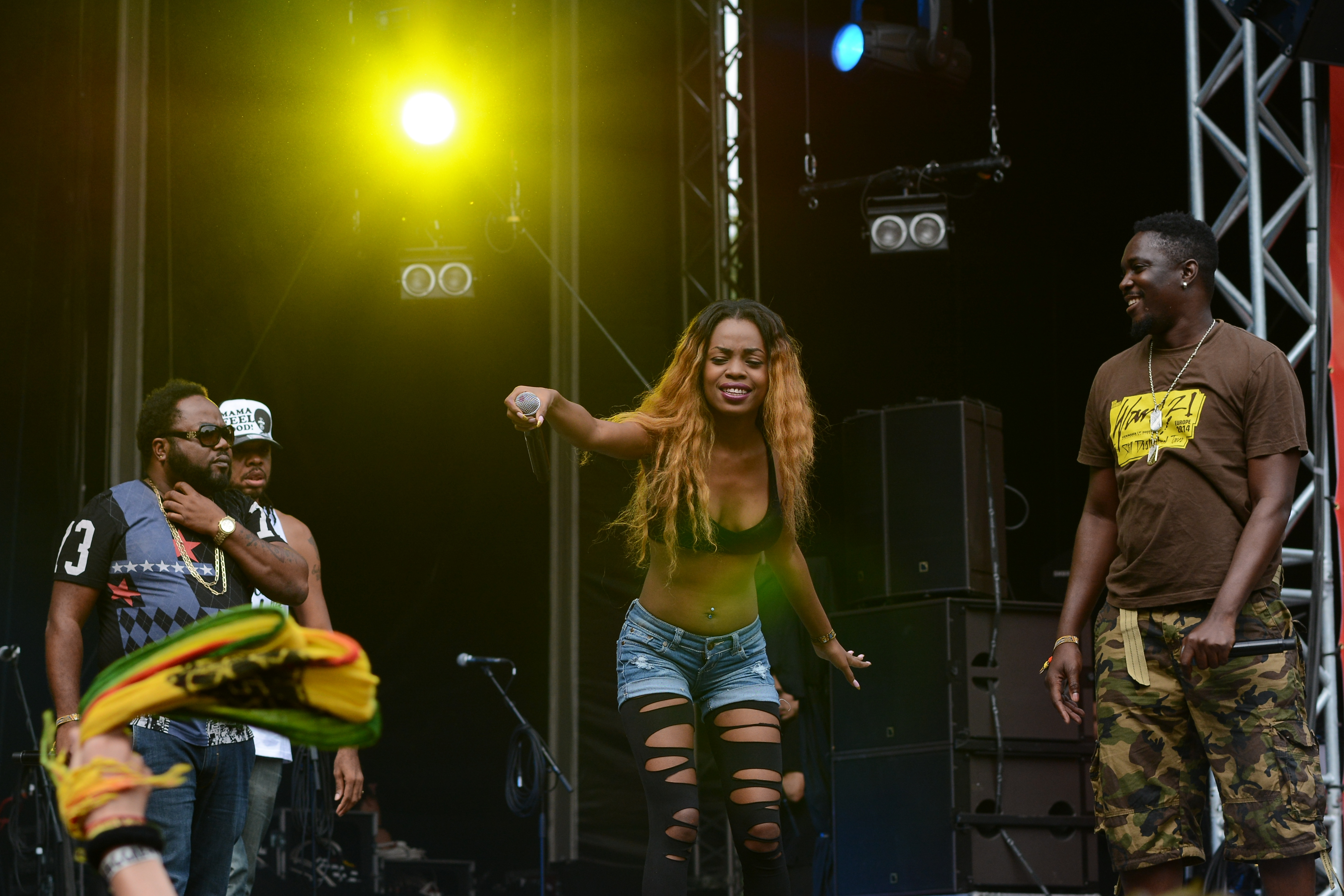
- Ward 21 feat. Marcy Chin at Ruhr Reggae Summer 2014

Background information
- Origin: Kingston, Jamaica
- Genres: Dancehall, reggae
- Years active: 1998 - present
- Labels: Greensleeves, Jammy's
- Members: Andre "Suku" Gray; Mark "Mean Dog" Henry; Kunley McCarthy
- Past members: Ranaldo "Rumblood" Evans
- Website: ward21music.com

Ward 21 are a group of dancehall musicians and producers from Kingston, Jamaica, named after the psychiatric ward at the University Hospital of the West Indies in Kingston. Comprising Ward 21 are renowned producers and have created hit dancehall riddims like "Badda badda", "Da Joint", "Bellyas", and "Volume" as well as hit singles like "Haters" and "Judgement Day".

== History ==
The group formed in the late 1990s and originally had four members — Kunley McCarthy, Andre "Suku" Gray, Mark "Meandawg" Henry, and Ranaldo "Rumblood" Evans. They were mentored by King Jammy and acted as selectors for his sound system. After leaving Jammy they signed to New York label Natural Bridge. They had their first success with the "Bada Bada" riddim in 1998, which was the basis of tracks by Beenie Man, Elephant Man and Chuck Fenda. As well as success as producers they had hits in their own right with tracks such as "Haters", "Judgement Day", and "Blood Stain". The group's first album, Mentally Disturbed, was released in 2001.

In 2005, the group went on a tour through Europe, playing shows in Belgium, The Netherlands, Germany, Romania, Switzerland, Italy and Spain. They also performed at Europe's second biggest reggae festival, Summerjam, later that year. Evans left the group in 2008.

Ward 21's productions include Capleton's "Slew Dem" and the Wayne Marshall/Bounty Killer duet "When The Smoke Clears". In addition to countless singles (released mostly on King Jammy's label) and tracks on compilations, Ward 21 have released three albums on the reggae label Greensleeves. The band had participated in 311's remix of Amber song in Supa Dups Remix. They also appear on Major Lazer's second album Free the Universe, on the track "Mashup the Dance".

On 22 January 2014 they released their fifth album, Still Disturbed, featuring contributions from Sean Paul and Konshens. The group played in Europe several times to promote the album.

In February 2017, single "Mek It Bunx Up" by DeeWunn and Marcy Chin (produced by Ward 21's member, Kunley McCarthy) reached over 25 Million views on Facebook.

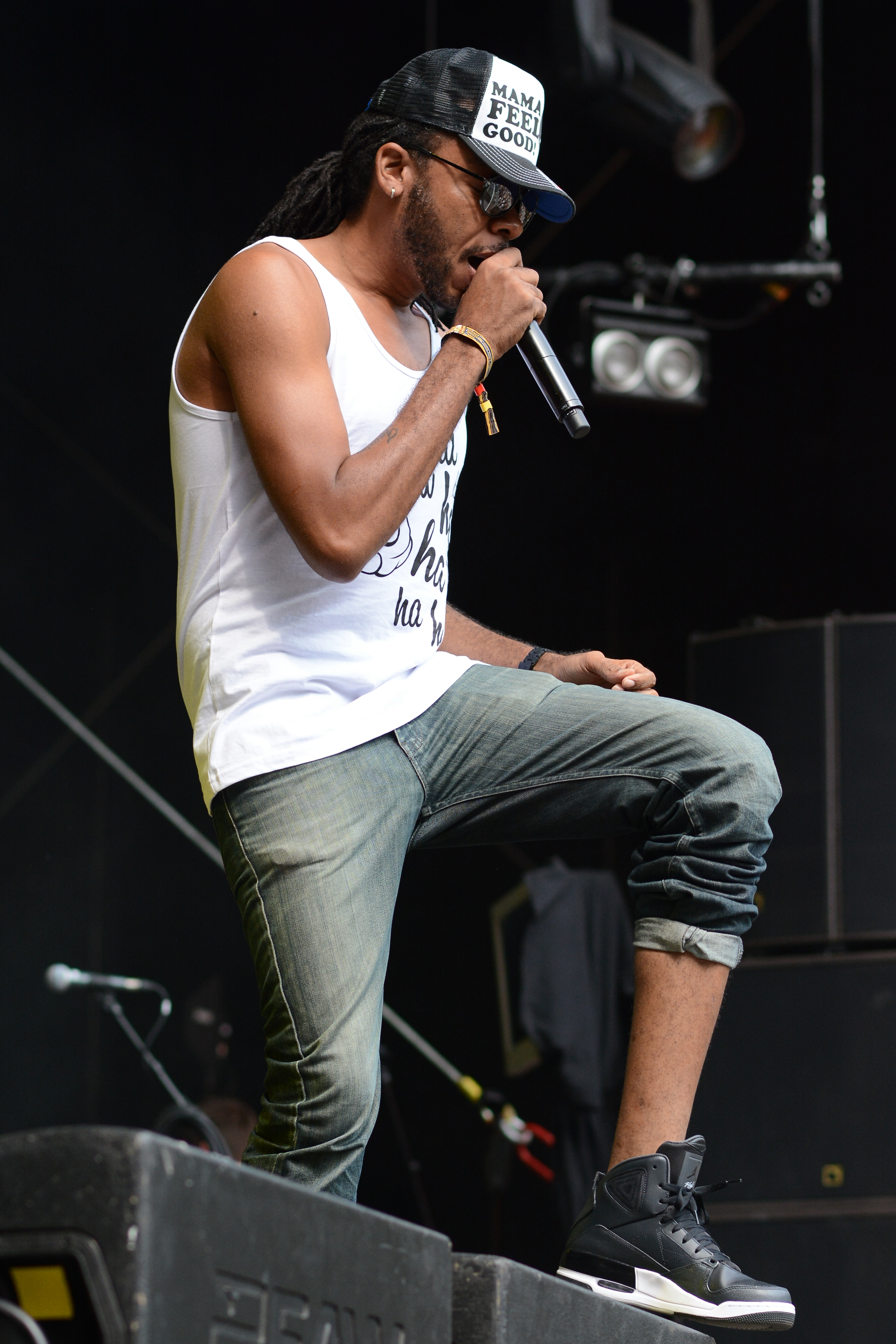
Andre "Suku" Gray

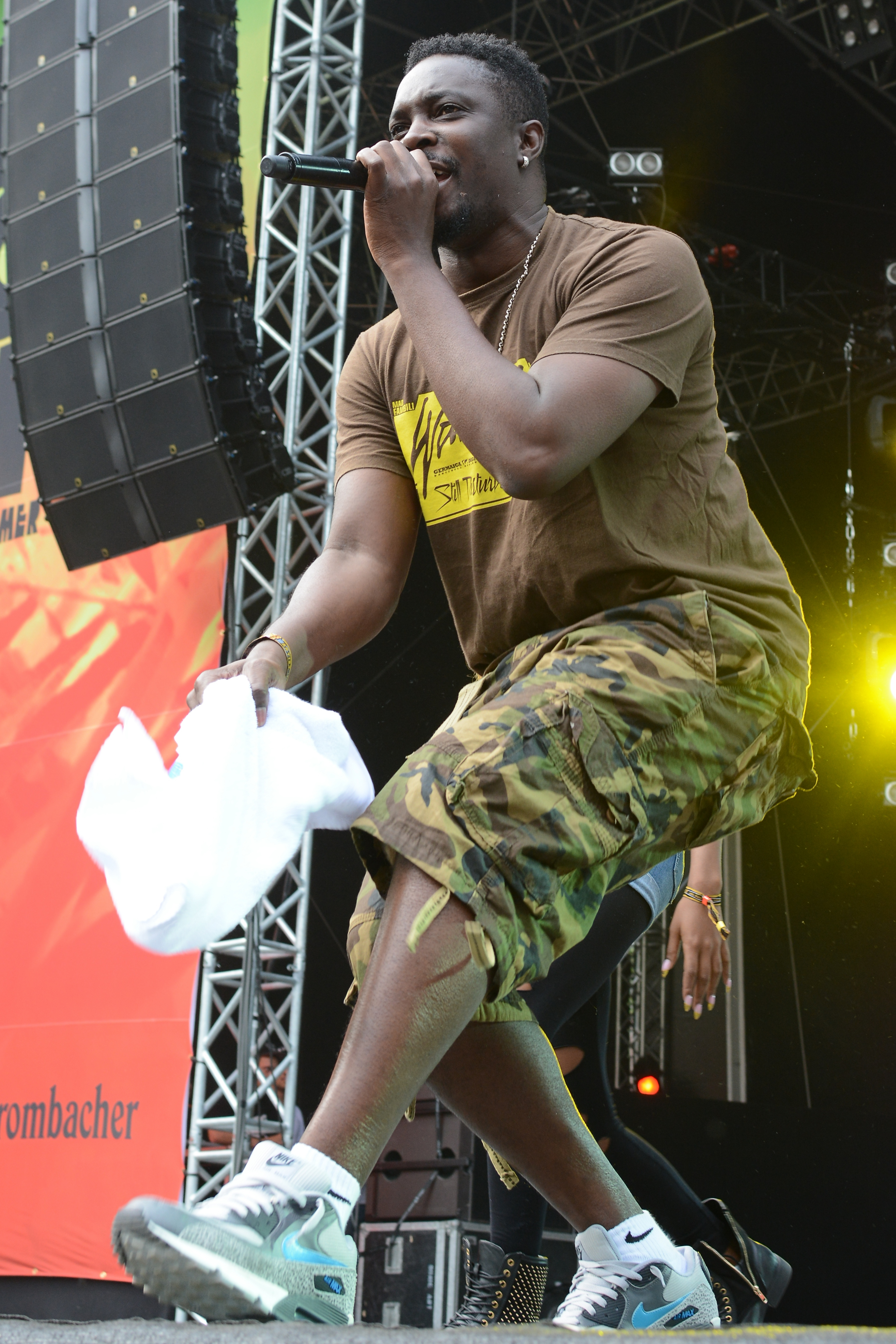
Kunley McCarthy

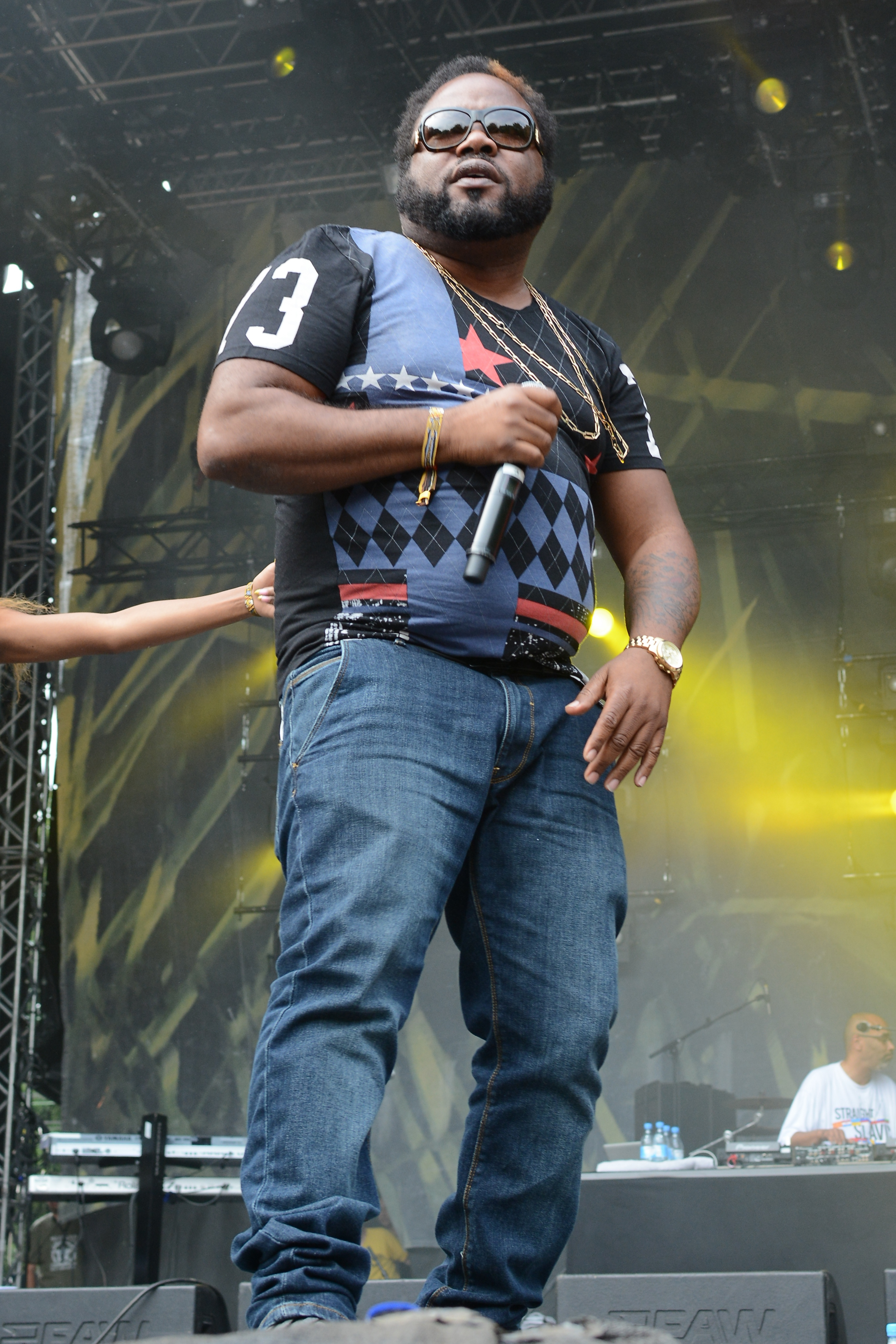
Mark "Mean Dawg" Henry

== Discography ==
=== Albums ===
- Mentally Disturbed (2001), Greensleeves
- U Know How We Roll (2003), Greensleeves
- King of the World (2007), Jamdown
- Genesis (2009), DHF
- Still Disturbed (2014), Germaica Digital
