= Evy Poumpouras =

U.S. journalist and author

Evyenia Poumpouras
- Born: January 1, 1977 (age 49); Astoria, Queens, U.S
- Education: Hofstra University; Argosy University; Columbia University
- Occupations: Journalist, author, special agent
- Employer: United States Secret Service (2000–2012)
- Children: 2
- Website: evypoumpouras.com

Evyenia "Evy" Poumpouras is a Greek American journalist and author. She was a special agent, polygraph examiner, and interrogator with the United States Secret Service from 2000 to 2012.

Poumpouras was a co-host of the Bravo TV series, Spy Games. She authored the memoir, Becoming Bulletproof (2020), and is an adjunct professor of criminal justice and criminology at the City University of New York.

== Early life ==
Poumpouras was born in the United States to immigrant parents from Greece. Her father is from Mesta and her mother is from Kilkis, Greece. She grew up in Astoria, Queens, New York City. As a child, she and her brother spent most of their summers in Greece with extended family members. Greek is her first language followed by English. She learned Italian while studying at the American University of Rome. Poumpouras learned Spanish while in Mexico for a semester and French after studying in France. She was the first in her family to attend college. She graduated from Hofstra University. Poumpouras earned an M.A. in forensic psychology from Argosy University.

== Career ==
Poumpouras worked in the insurance industry after college. She interned for U.S. representative Carolyn McCarthy who suggested she consider joining the Federal Bureau of Investigation or United States Secret Service (USSS). At the age of 23, Poumpouras spent five months training at the police academy of the New York City Police Department. In 2000, she then accepted an offer to join the USSS. Early into her career, she faced sexism from her colleagues. At the time, over 90 percent of special agents were males. Poumpouras passed the same physical requirements as her male counterparts. She worked for the USSS for twelve years during the Clinton, Bush, and Obama administrations. For her first eight years in the service, Poumpouras worked in the New York Field Office as a polygraph examiner and interrogator in the polygraph unit. She interviewed criminal offenders and suspects to gain intelligence. She was a first responder to the September 11 attacks, for which, she received a USSS Valor Award. After the attacks, she learned Arabic. Poumpouras later served as a special agent in the presidential protective division tasked with protecting president Barack Obama and first lady Michelle Obama. She left the USSS in 2012.

After leaving USSS, Poumpouras earned a master's degree in journalism from the Columbia University Graduate School of Journalism. In 2020, Poumpouras authored the memoir, Becoming Bulletproof. She is a journalist and co-hosted the Bravo TV series, Spy Games. She is an adjunct professor of criminal justice and criminology at the City University of New York.

== Personal life ==
Poumpouras is married to a fellow agent. In 2022, Pompouras gave birth to their first child, a daughter. In June 2026, they welcomed their second child.

== Selected works ==
- Poumpouras, Evy (2020). Becoming Bulletproof: Protect Yourself, Read People, Influence Situations, and Live Fearlessly. Simon and Schuster. ISBN 978-1-9821-0375-0.
