= Elena Melnik =

Russian fashion model (born 1986)

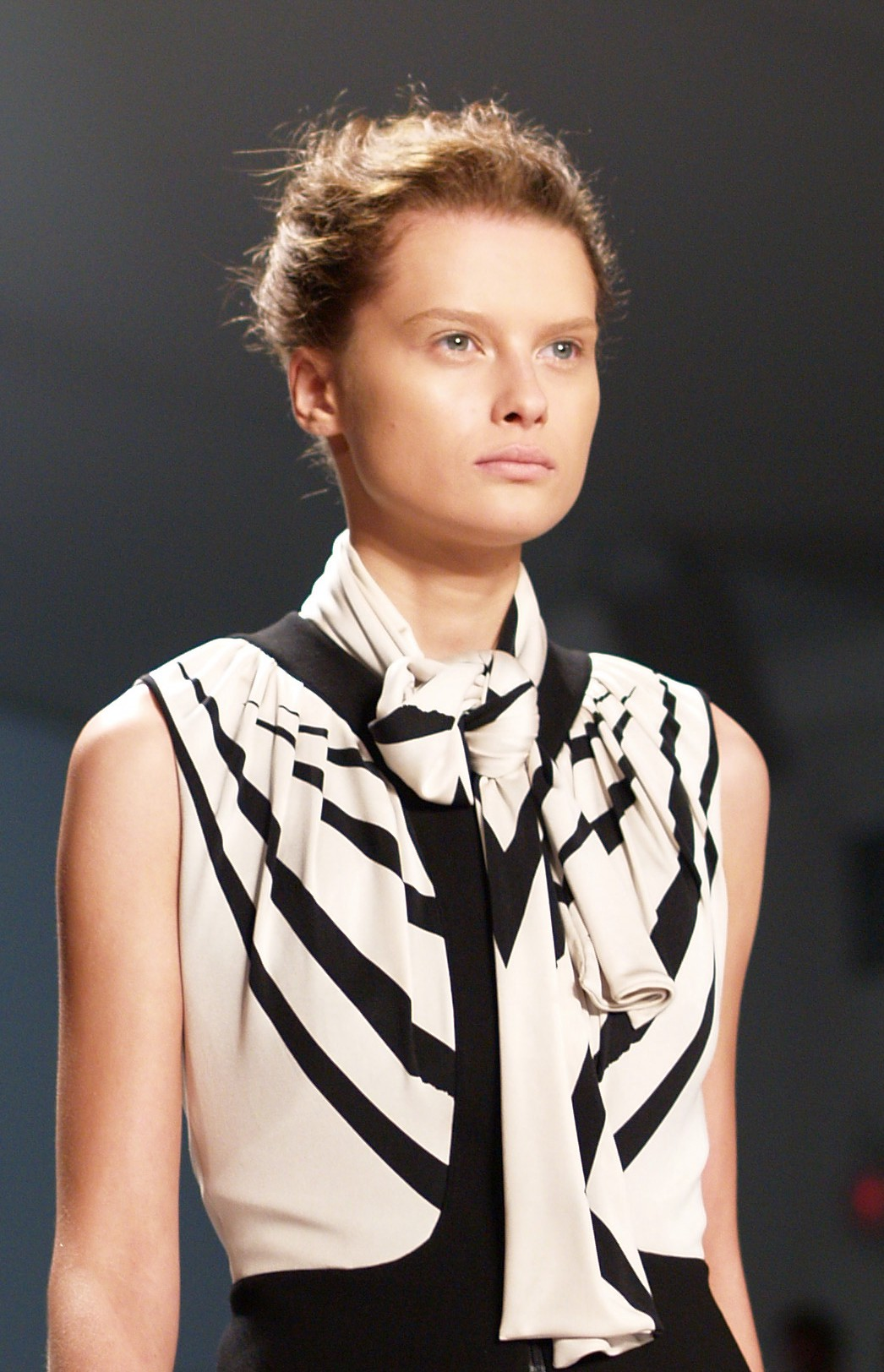
- Elena Melnik modeling in Doo.Ri Spring 2007 show, New York Fashion Week, 15 September 2006.
- Born: 1986 (age 39–40); Sverdlovsk, Russian SFSR, Soviet Union
- Years active: 2005-
- Modeling information
- Height: 5 ft 9 in (1.75 m)
- Hair color: Light brown
- Eye color: Blue / green
- Agency: Trump Model Management (New York), Silent models (Paris)

Elena Melnik (Russian: Елена Мельник; born 8 September 1986) is a Russian fashion model.

== Biography ==
She began her career in 2005, when she debuted on the runway as an exclusive model for Calvin Klein. She has also appeared on the runway for brands including Louis Vuitton, Balmain, Diane von Furstenberg, Marchesa, MaxMara, Rodarte, Trovata, among many others.

Melnik has been featured on the cover of Vogue Spain, Vogue Portugal, Harper's Bazaar UK, ZOO Magazine, L'Officiel Italia, Marie Claire Italia, Elle Brasil, Flair Magazine and has appeared in editorials in British, German, French, Spanish, and Italian Vogue.

Melnik's most notable campaign works include two seasons as the face of Givenchy cosmetics, a Vera Wang fragrance contract, a Boucheron fragrance contract, and ads for D&G, Lacoste, Sportmax, Joseph, and Barbara Bui.

She is represented by Silent models in Paris.
