= Mia Kang =

Model (born 1988)

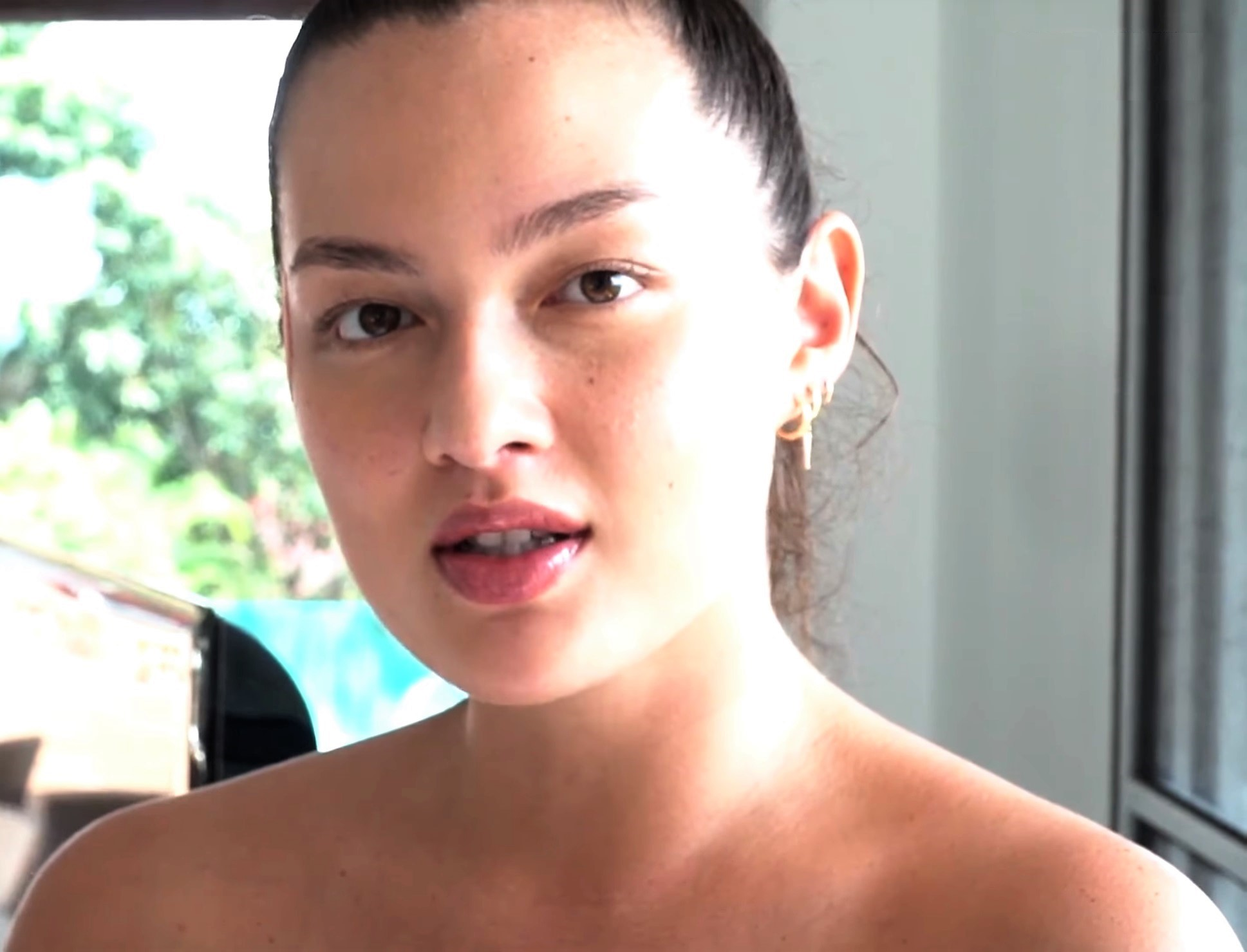
- Kang on Uproxx in 2017
- Born: 30 December 1988 (age 37); Hong Kong
- Modeling information
- Height: 5 ft 10 in (178 cm)
- Hair color: Brown
- Eye color: Brown
- Agency: IMG Models

Mia Kang (born 30 December 1988) is a British-Swiss fashion model, Muay Thai fighter, body confidence advocate, and television host based in New York City. Kang grew up in Hong Kong and was bullied as a young girl for being overweight. She halved her weight at the age of 13 and was soon scouted as a model. Kang modeled across Asia and Europe through her high school and college years. She got a master's degree in finance and financial law in England, and left modeling to work as a commodities trader, before returning to modeling in New York City and winning the 2016 Sports Illustrated Swimsuit Issue model search and being named a 2017 Rookie.

Despite her modeling success, Kang was miserable with the eating disorders that she felt the modeling industry demanded to stay thin, until she took up the martial art Muay Thai in Thailand. Training and fighting gained her respect for her body, healthy eating habits, weight and muscle. She now advocates for women's body confidence, while continuing to model, and hosting Spy Games, an American reality competition television series.

== Early life and modeling ==
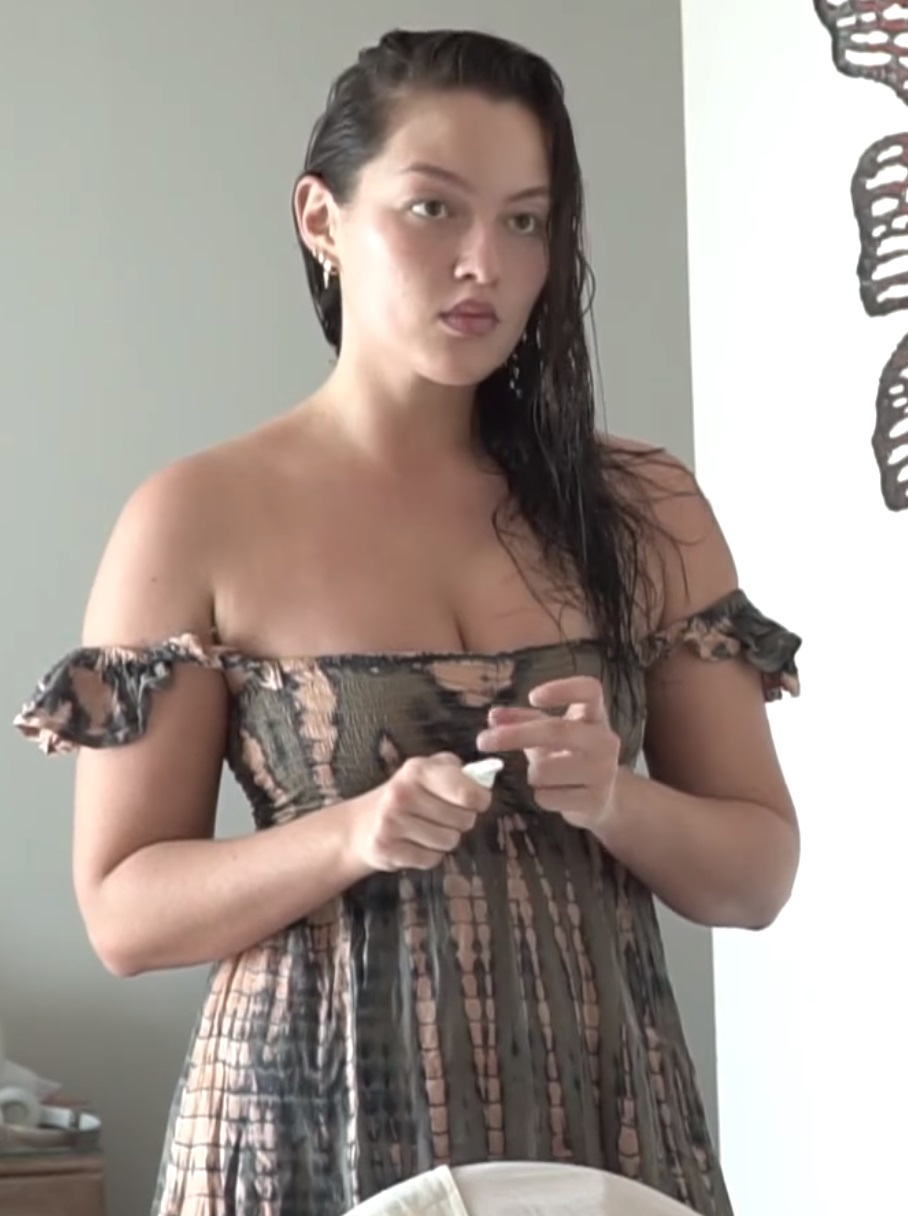
Kang on Uproxx in 2017

Mia Kang was born and raised in Hong Kong, though she has Swiss nationality. Her father is British and her mother is South Korean; they met while living in Taiwan, then moved to Hong Kong for business. Both parents were academics, with her father being a physicist from Oxford University. She has four older half-siblings (two half-sisters with the same father and a Taiwanese mother, and two half-brothers with the same mother and a different British father), but they lived in other parts of the world as she was growing up.

As a teenager, Kang studied at and eventually graduated from the international Island School in Hong Kong, but never felt like she fit in. She says the Asian kids would socialize together and the western kids would socialize together, but she was half Korean and half British, and never felt she belonged with either.

Kang grew up bullied and overweight, though a Sports Illustrated Swimsuit Issue cover with model Tyra Banks hung on her wall. When she was 13, a doctor told her she was obese, and at risk of weight related diabetes. So she went to the other extreme and essentially stopped eating, halving her weight in a couple of months. She says that she was around 86 kilograms (190 lb) before dropping to around 43 kilograms (95 lb); she was size 14 and became size 0. At the same time, she grew 6 inches (15 cm). The boys who had bullied her now asked her out on dates.

Getting thin led to her being scouted as a model while still 13 years old, by her dance teacher. One of her first jobs was a Levi's campaign, and she remembers being surprised seeing her picture in shops in Times Square.

After graduating high school, Kang modeled abroad, in Tokyo, Singapore, Milan, and London. For several years she was signed with the London Models 1 agency.

== Higher education and finance career ==
Kang studied philosophy and economics at Bristol University, earning a bachelor's degree, then got a master's degree in finance and financial law at the School of Oriental and African Studies. She says her education is the thing in her life that she is proudest of, and intends to return one day for a doctorate or an MBA.

After graduating, Kang left modeling to use her degree in finance as a London commodities trader. She was on the path to becoming a derivatives consultant in her mid-20s, when she realized she felt stifled and decided to try the modeling profession one more time.

== Return to modeling ==
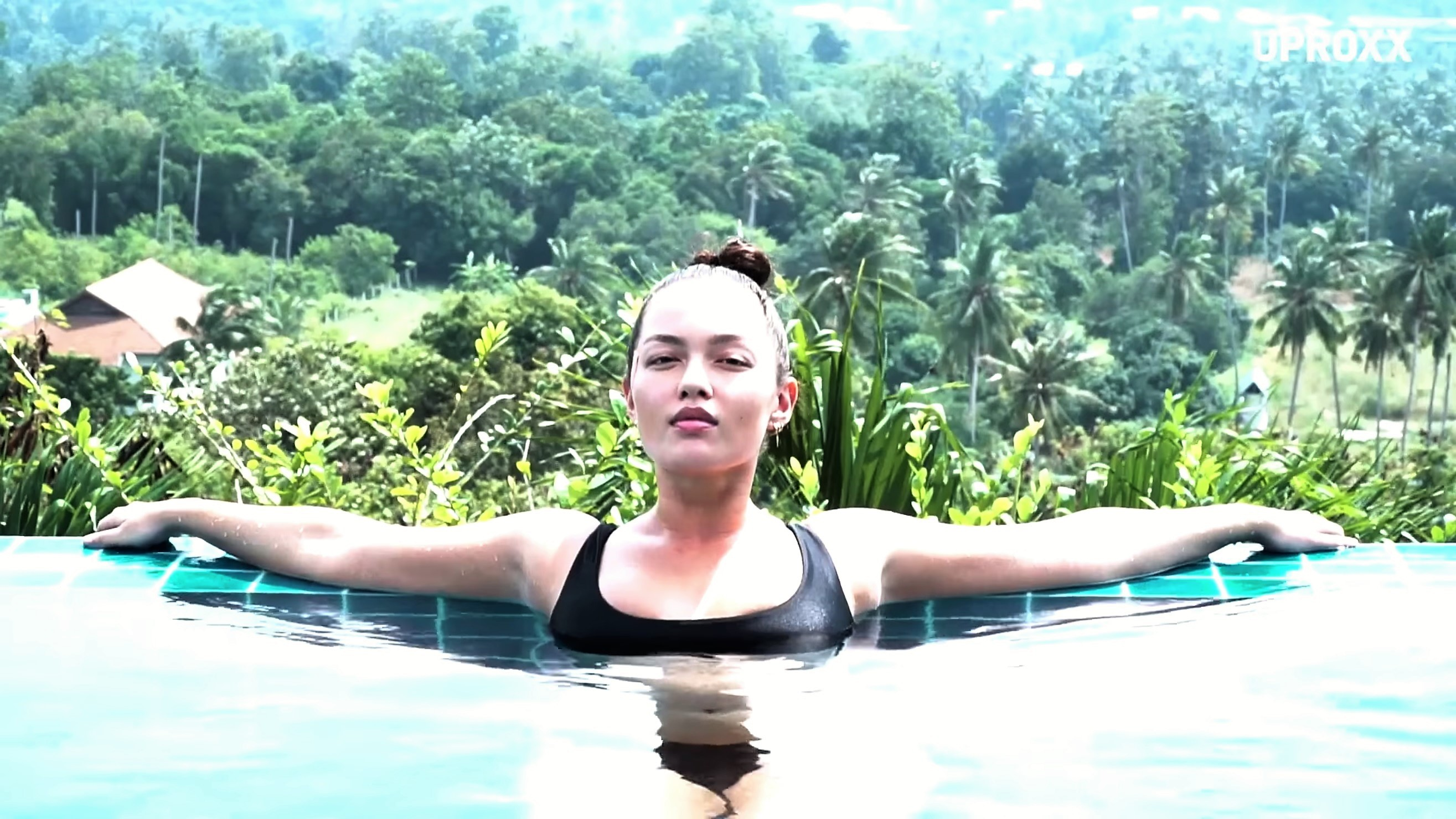
Kang in swimsuit in 2017

In 2015, Kang signed with Trump Model Management and moved from Hong Kong to New York City, home of most of the world's top models. Sports Illustrated was her first New York City modeling assignment, and she was the first Hongkonger to become a Sports Illustrated model. She also worked in campaigns for Guess. In August 2016, she defeated five other models from around the world in a public vote and was named the winner of the magazine's Swimsuit 2016 Model Search, to be featured in the 2017 Sports Illustrated Swimsuit Issue. She was also declared a Sports Illustrated Swimsuit Issue 2017 Rookie.

However, she was very unhappy. She was being asked to starve herself, and go on 10-day liquid diets between photo shoots. It was normal for her to go four days without eating. She was obsessed with being thinner, and living off of "Marlboro Lights, black coffee, and alcohol." At her low point, she was contemplating suicide.

== Muay Thai and body confidence ==
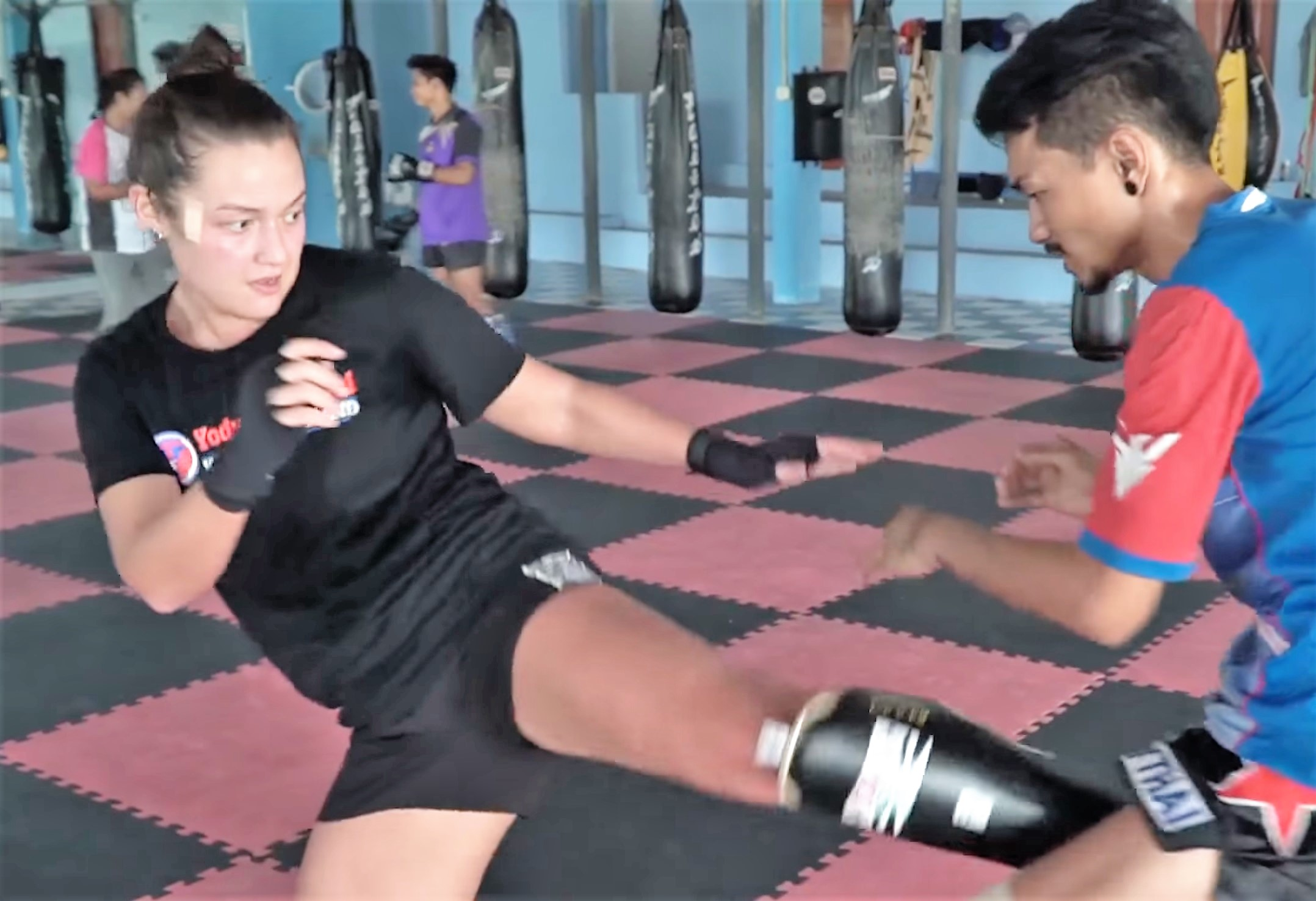
Kang in Muay Thai training in 2017

Kang's family have a home in Koh Samui, an island off the east coast of Thailand. Kang was taking a 10-day holiday from modeling there in 2016, when she noticed young fighters from a local gym training in the combat sport Muay Thai by the side of the road, and asked if she could try it; initially just to help her lose more of the weight that she was told she needed to. The coaches were impressed enough by her workout that they suggested she join. The 10 days turned into a six or nine-month training camp, of six day a week routines. The martial arts training taught her to respect her body. The workouts were so intense she forgot she smoked. She stopped restricting what she ate, added 20-30+ pounds, became more muscled, and gained definition. Her dress size went from a size two-four to a size four-six.

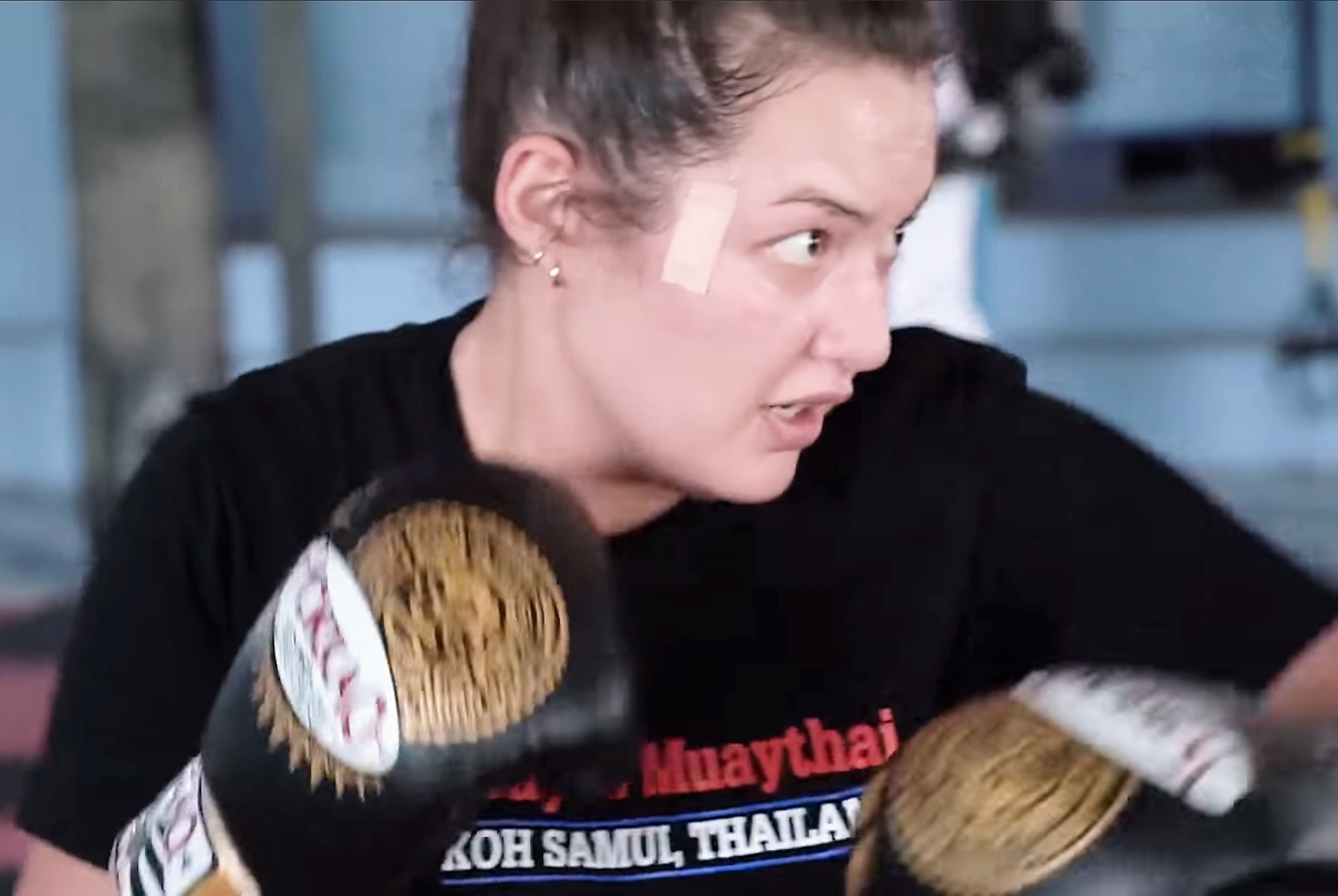
Kang in Muay Thai training in 2017

Kang began to alternate her time between training and returning to New York for modeling. She kept training in New York with Phil Nurse at The Wat, and Hollywood Hino of Church Street Boxing, for about three hours daily, and in Thailand at the Bangkok Yokkao and her first gym, Yodyut, on Koh Samui, for about six hours each day. She decided to compete in her first professional Muay Thai fight in May 2017. She would have done it earlier, but her modeling agency objected strenuously; the money wasn't much compared to US modeling fees, and being injured in a fight would put her career in doubt. At least she needed to first shoot the Sports Illustrated Swimsuit Issue. Sports Illustrated promised to film the fight for a digital documentary. She took a month long training with legendary Muay Thai fighter Saenchai to prepare for her fight. Her trainers recommended she "have as much sex as possible" before her fight, to increase testosterone levels.

Kang's first professional fight was on 7 May 2017. She was matched against Thai fighter Nong B, who had five bouts experience. She won the second round, then went in with "heavy hands" in the third round, hitting her opponent hard, and winning by technical knockout. After her victory, Kang was excited to continue into mixed martial arts, and signed with manager Malki Kawa of leading MMA agency First Round Management.

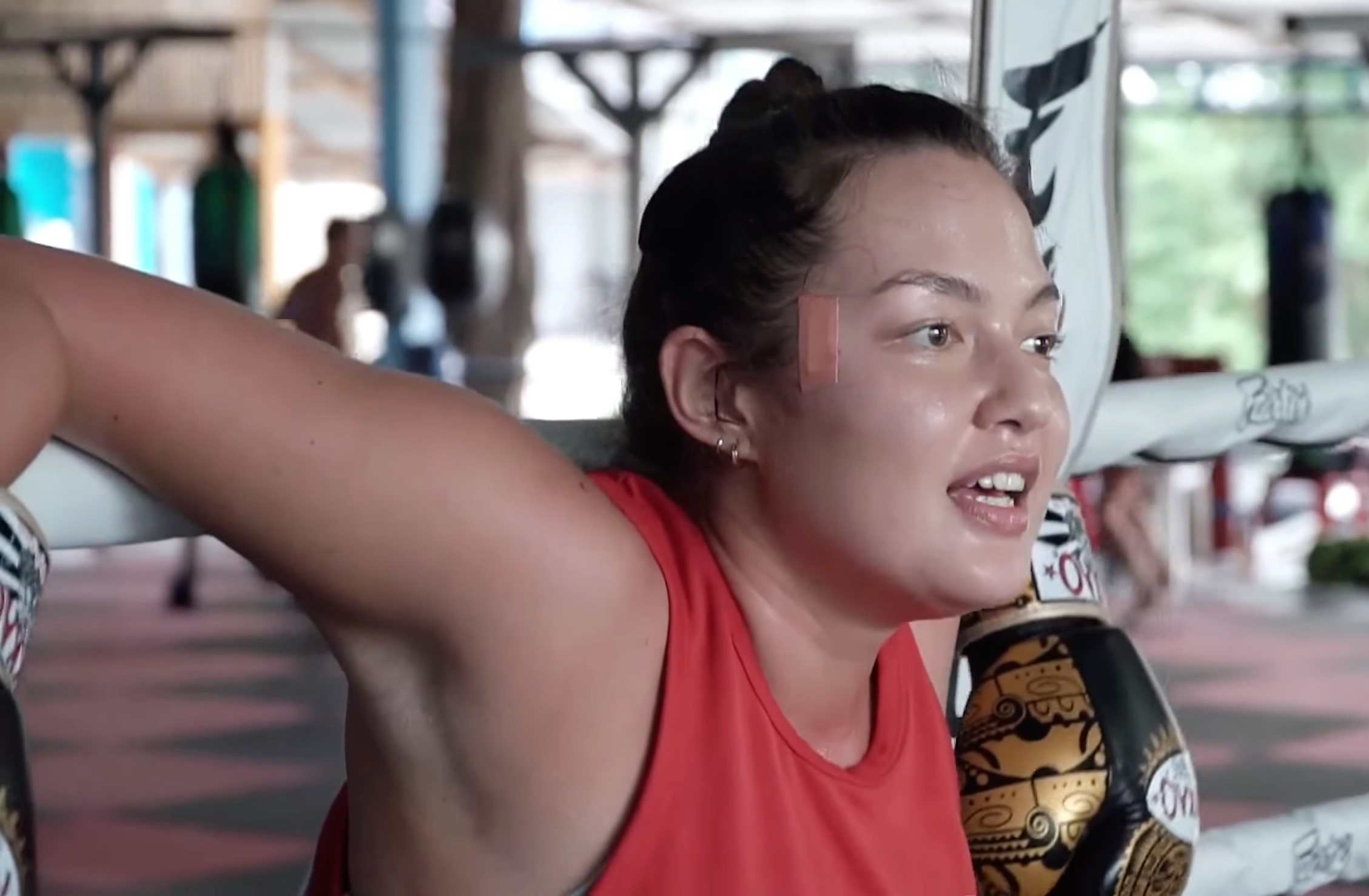
Kang in Muay Thai training in 2017

Kang credits Muay Thai for teaching her to love her body and even saving her life. She became a body confidence advocate, encouraging all women to have strong and healthy bodies. She started her own all-female boxing club in SoHo, New York, called "Killa Girl Gang", after her fighting name, "Killa Kang", for all levels of fitness. She hosted a body positivity retreat on Koh Samui with travel agency 109 World. A May 2018 Instagram post in which she compared photos of her emaciated size two, 99 pounds (45 kg) body in 2015 with her size eight, 170 pounds (77 kg) body in 2018, drew 14,000 "likes" and international press coverage. Kang was named a 2018 Today Show Style Hero, and the 2019 Self magazine New Year's Challenge star.

Kang continues to model, but says that her new size, eight or ten in 2018, puts her above the standard model sizes, and yet below the plus-size model sizes, so clients ask that she either gain or lose weight.

In 2020, Kang became the host of Spy Games, a reality competition television series on the American television channel Bravo, in which ten contestants compete in spy-inspired exercises for $100,000.

== Charity work ==
Kang tries to work with a charity in every country she models in. She supports the Wor Watthana Muay Thai gym that helps children in an impoverished region of northeast Thailand. In 2017, she raised money for a sex trafficking project called "18 for 18 Project Rescue", by skydiving from 18,000 feet (5,500 m), the highest in North America.

== Publication ==
Kang published a memoir entitled Knockout in 2020. In her memoir, shediscussed her very personal journey from self-loathing to self-love as she struggled with body dysmorphia and eating disorders in her youth and during her modeling career. Her memoir is centered around her experience with Muay Thai and the positive impact it has had on her life. Knockout was published by Abrams Books in October 2020, and was met with positive reception.
