= Silent Models =

Modeling agency

- Company type: Limited Liability Company
- Industry: Fashion
- Founded: New York City, New York (2008)
- Headquarters: New York City, New York, U.S.
- Key people: Kevin Fitzpatrick, Executive Director
- Website: silentmodelsny.com

Silent Models New York, founded in 2008, is a boutique modeling agency based in New York. Silent Models New York represents notable models Line Brems, Freja Jeppesen, Emma Stern, and Camilla Christensen. Silent's models have appeared in editorials for Vogue Italia, Vogue Paris, 032c, French Revue de Modes, Harper's Bazaar, Vs. and others. The agency's models have also appeared in campaigns for Calvin Klein, Gucci, Prada, Miu Miu, Ralph Lauren, Tory Burch, Juicy Couture and other top designers and fashion houses.

== History ==
Silent Models New York was founded in 2008 and was originally in a partnership with Silent Models Paris, which helped to curate the careers of models such as Anna Selezneva, Isabeli Fontana, Carmen Kass, and Elena Melnik. In 2012, Silent Models New York began to operate separately from Silent Models Paris.

== Models ==
Fashion models currently represented by Silent Models include Anna Selezneva, Melodie Monrose, Indira Scott, and Carmen Kass.

== See also ==
- List of modeling agencies
