= Trump Model Management =

American modeling agency (1999–2017)

- Type: Private
- Industry: Fashion
- Founded: 1999
- Founder: Donald Trump
- Defunct: 2017
- Headquarters: New York City, New York, U.S.
- Key people: Donald Trump Founder
- Products: modeling agency
- Revenue: N/A
- Owner: Donald Trump
- Number of employees: N/A
- Website: trumpmodels.com (archived)

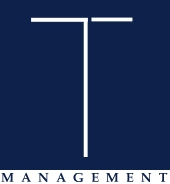
Logo (old)

Trump Model Management, later shortened to T Management, was a New York City-based modeling agency founded by Donald Trump as T Models in 1999. It was closed by Trump in April 2017, shortly after he became U.S. president.

While the agency had a respectable "legends" division, its new talent division never launched the career of a new model, and was considered to be an inconsequential agency when it folded.

== History ==
In October 2014, Trump Model Management was sued by model Alexia Palmer. Palmer alleged that 80% of her wages were taken away from her as "expenses" and that she had been paid less than $4000 over a two-year period. The lawsuit was dismissed in March 2016.

In July 2015, it was reported that Trump Model Management and Trump Management Group LLC combined had requested US visas for almost 250 international fashion models.

In August 2016, former Trump models alleged that they had worked for the agency without the company having obtained proper work visas on their behalf.

In September 2016, Senator Barbara Boxer called on United States Citizenship and Immigration Services to investigate the allegations.

In 2016 and early 2017, the company saw senior staff departing to start new agencies, and models announcing departures from the company, with some citing concerns about Trump's politics.

In April 2017, after Trump was inaugurated as U.S president, it was announced that the agency would be closed down.

== Represented models (past) ==
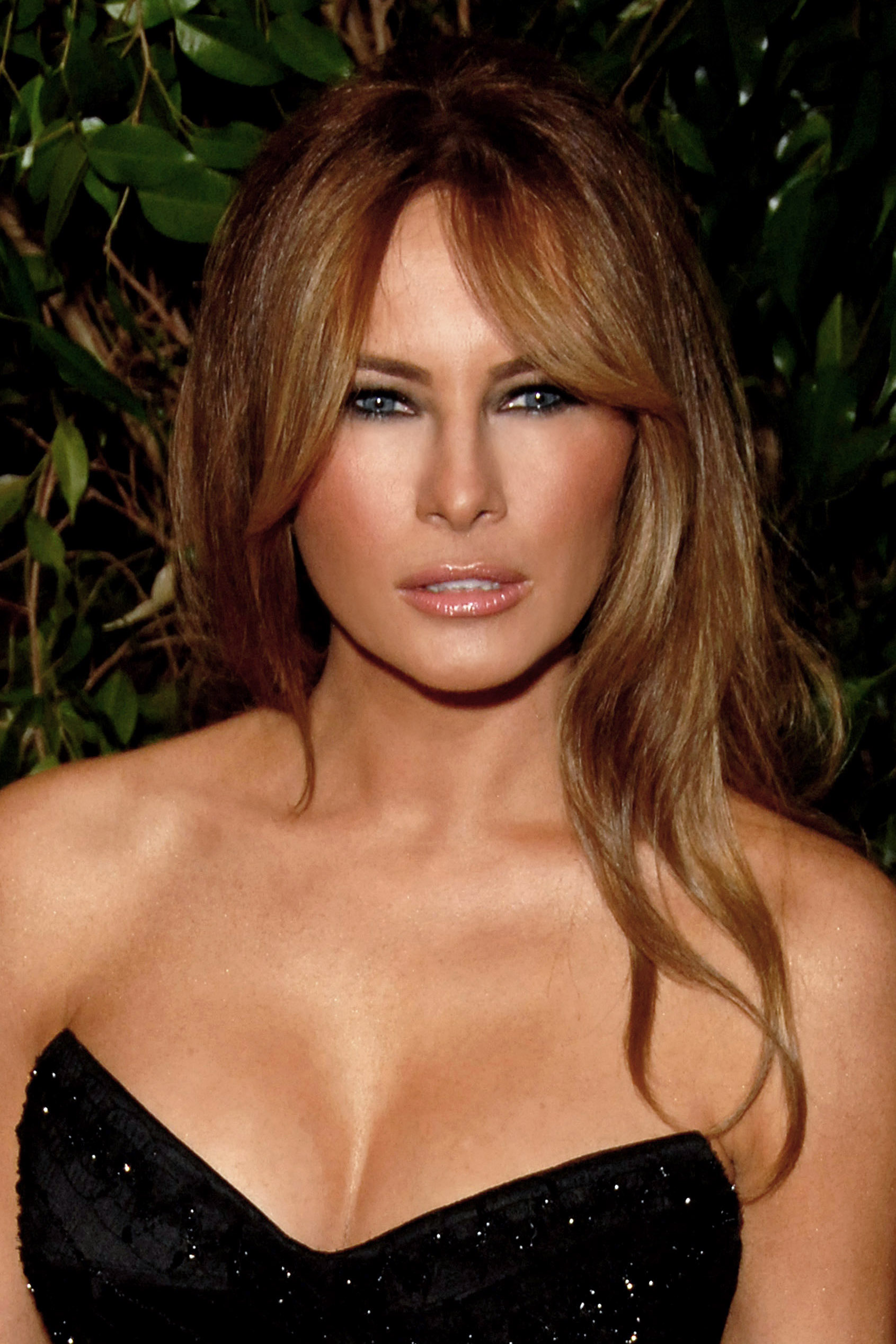
Melania Trump was associated as a model with Trump Model Management before her marriage to Donald Trump.

- Carol Alt
- Rachel Blais
- Alyssa Campanella
- Agbani Darego
- Carmen Dell'Orefice
- Irene Esser
- Rachel Blais
- Rila Fukushima
- Karina González
- Jerry Hall
- Tricia Helfer
- Danielle Herrington
- Paris Hilton
- Beverly Johnson
- Kiara Kabukuru
- Mia Kang
- Jodie Kidd
- Hannelore Knuts
- Yasmin Le Bon
- Ali MacGraw
- Shirley Mallmann
- Eugenia Mandzhieva
- Claudia Mason
- Elena Melnik
- Dayana Mendoza
- Katie Moore
- Ximena Navarrete
- Alexia Palmer
- Hye-rim Park
- Tatjana Patitz
- Rozanna Purcell
- Maggie Rizer
- Isabella Rossellini
- Hollie-May Saker
- Ève Salvail
- Mirjeta Shala
- Alyona Subbotina
- Siri Tollerod
- Melania Trump
- Brittany Woodward
- Kara Young
- Paulina Vega

== See also ==
- List of things named after Donald Trump
- List of modeling agencies
