= Douglas Laux =

American CIA officer (1983–2025)

- Born: January 20, 1983; Coldwater, Ohio, U.S.
- Died: September 21, 2025 (aged 42); Coldwater, Ohio, U.S.
- Education: Indiana University Bloomington
- Website: 2minutewindow.com

Douglas A. Laux (January 20, 1983 – September 21, 2025) was an American case officer for the Central Intelligence Agency, having served undercover in the Middle East and Afghanistan for eight years. Upon leaving the CIA, Laux wrote a New York Times Bestselling memoir, Left of Boom, which details his experiences serving after the September 11 terrorist attacks.

== Early life and education ==
Laux was born in Coldwater, Ohio, on January 20, 1983. He attended Indiana University Bloomington, earning a bachelor's degree in political science and East Asian studies with a focus on the Japanese language. He also pursued a master's degree from Loyola Marymount University.

== Service with CIA ==
Laux joined the CIA after a short stint working for the shipping company DHL following his graduation from IU. Laux was an officer in the Near East Division and served multiple tours in Afghanistan and the Middle East. Frustrated with the bureaucratic handling of the Syrian Civil War, Laux resigned from the Agency in February 2013. Upon his departure, Laux served with Joint Special Operations Command until 2016.

== Career after CIA ==
=== Media ===
In April 2016, Laux published his New York Times Bestselling memoir, Left of Boom: How A Young CIA Case Officer Penetrated the Taliban and Al-Qaeda. A year later, Laux appeared in six episodes of the Discovery Channel series Finding Escobar's Millions, which debuted on November 3, 2017. He is also credited as the executive producer and creator of the series. In September 2017, Laux's photography was featured in a Playboy Magazine article entitled, "In The Path of the Totality: Notes of a Veteran Chasing the Eclipse." Debuting on January 20, 2020, Laux appeared in eight episodes of the Bravo Channel series Spy Games. Laux's role was as an "Assessor" responsible for building challenges for contestants and then critiquing them on their performance.

=== Community ===
In the fall of 2019, Laux founded the non-profit organization CVLSRVNT to better support active duty Ohioans deployed overseas.

== Death ==
Laux died at his home in Coldwater, Ohio, on September 21, 2025, at the age of 42.

== Publications ==
- Laux, Douglas (2016). Left of Boom: How A Young CIA Case Officer Penetrated the Taliban and Al-Qaeda. New York: St. Martin's Press. ISBN 9781250081360.
