= DeeWunn =

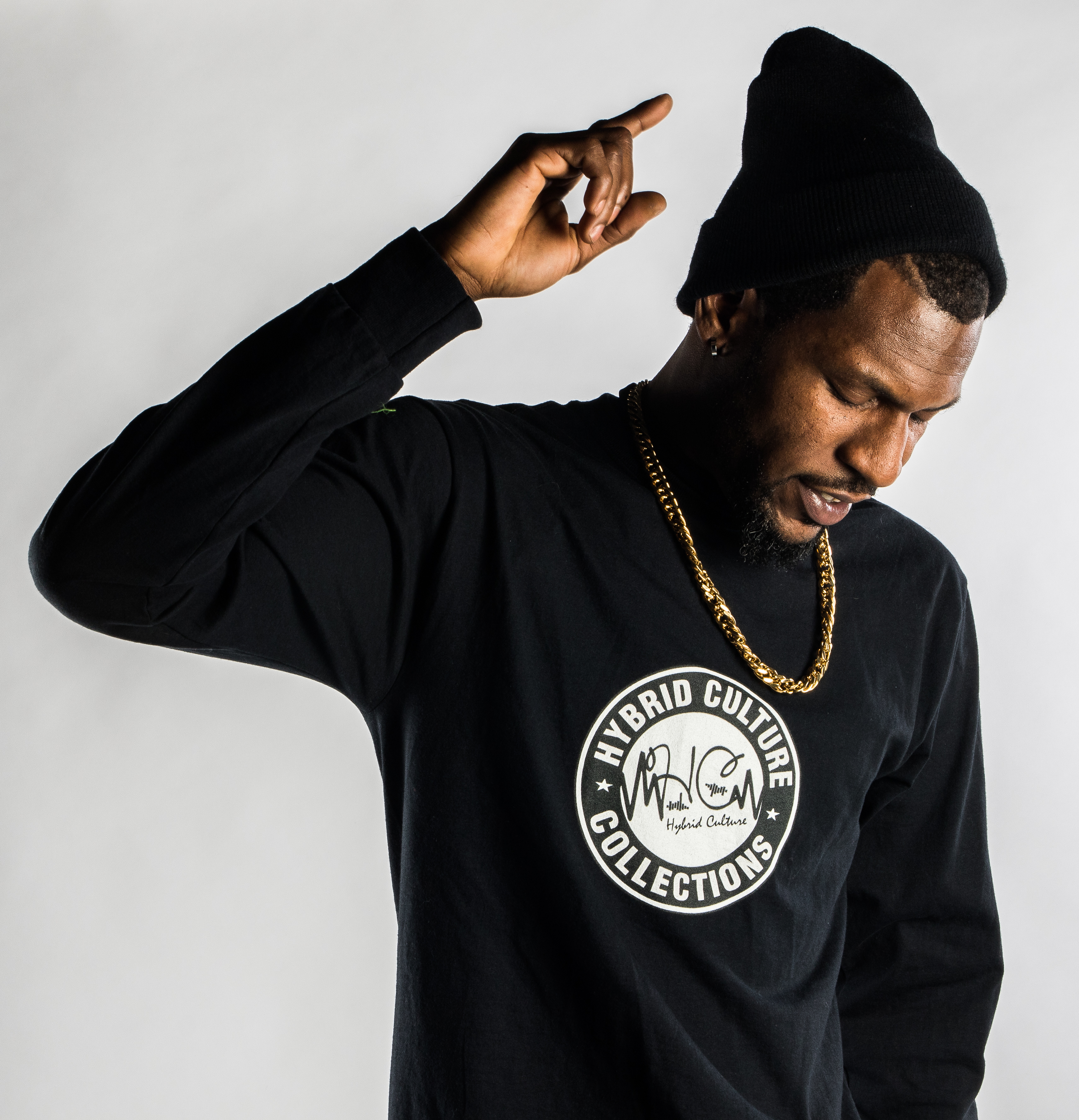

Background information
- Born: Damone Walker; 5 May 1981 (age 45); St. Andrew, Jamaica
- Genres: Dancehall; Hip hop; reggae
- Occupations: Singer; songwriter; rapper; record producer
- Years active: 2007–present
- Labels: Waxploitation, Ministry of Sound

DeeWunn (real name Damone Walker) is a Jamaican-Canadian singer, songwriter, rapper and record producer. Introduced by Jamaican dancehall group Ward 21, he is popular for his style of creating an exotic blend of hip-hop in Jamaican Patois.

His viral single "Mek It Bunx Up" featuring Marcy Chin was signed to Sony UK's sub label Ministry of Sound and remixed by Australian rapper Iggy Azalea. Since its release, this single has a combined total of 150,000,000 views on YouTube and over 20 million listens on Spotify.

== Career ==
DeeWunn began his career as an emcee, performing rap battles in several venues across Jamaica.

In 2010, DeeWunn was called on as a songwriter and vocalist by dancehall group, Ward 21, with whom he spent time penning songs for in-house artists such as Timberlee, Natalie Storm and more. He also made recorded his own music.

In 2013, his viral single, "Mek It Bunx Up", featuring Marcy Chin and produced by Kunley McCarthy of Ward 21 was released. The success attracted attention from DJs including Diplo, BBC 1Xtra's Seani B, ZJ Johnny Kool, New York's Hot 97's Massive B and more. "Mek It Bunx Up" has been played on radio stations and nightclubs in several locations worldwide, and was featured on FOX's "So You Think You Can Dance."

In 2015, the song gained online popularity after Parris Goebel (who choreographed Justin Bieber’s "Sorry" music video) recorded an impromptu performance dancing to the song on YouTube alongside students from her class at Urban Dance Camp. Since her original upload, there have been numerous independently made videos by dancers from around the world as well. The track also made it to #30 on the Bulgarian Top 40 Radio Charts and reached #95 on Shazam's World Charts in January 2016.

DeeWunn then worked in Portland, Jamaica as a songwriter for GeeJam Studios (spearheaded by Jon Baker). He wrote songs for artists including Mystic Davis, Charlie B, A-Game, Nailah, Nordia Baker, and Lily Allen.

In October 2016, DeeWunn released his debut album Bunx Up - The Official Street LP. In December 2016, Parris Goebel featured DeeWunn in her single, "Dynamite", which was featured in her debut album Vicious.

In June 2017, "Mek It Bunx Up" made its TV debut during an episode of Fox's SYTYCD. DeeWunn also completed two European tours during 2017.

In January 2018, DeeWunn collaborated with Jamaican producer TJ Records for the single "Tun Suh". The video was released in May and features Annesa Badshaw, a video vixen, fashion model, and recording artist from Toronto, known for her work with artists like Cyhi The Prince and Drake.

DeeWunn later signed on with Los Angeles-based label Waxploitation and released "Back It Up, Drop It" in 2019. The song was later used in a Samsung Galaxy S10 commercial.

== Personal life ==
Damone migrated to Montreal, Quebec, Canada in January 2015.

== Discography ==
=== Albums ===
- BANGGAZ (2023), Waxploitation

1. "Badman Party"
2. "Bumper Ah Roll"
3. "Hot Gyal Bubble"
4. "Bunx Pon Sumn"
5. "Run Come Down"
6. "Back Up It, Drop It"
7. "Milkshake & Jello"
8. "Bubble & Bunx"
9. "Jaw Jump"
10. "It's Going Down"
11. "Too Legit"
12. "Milkshake & Jello" (Lento Remix)

- Bunx Up - The Official Street LP (2016), Billionaire Bootcamp Records

1. "Jamdown Start Up"
2. "Mek It Bunx Up" (ft. Marcy Chin)
3. "High Grade, White Rum" (ft. Marcy Chin, Sly Rankin)
4. "Gimme 60" (ft. Natalie Storm)
5. "Get Vex" (ft. Timberlee)
6. "Crusher"
7. "Claat Gunshot" (ft. Kunley / Ward 21)
8. "Gangsta Muzik"
9. "In the Ghetto"
10. "Mek It Bunx Up" (Senthova Remix)

=== Singles ===
Lead Artist

- "Paparazzi" (2008)
- "Swag Stays On" (Brain Freeze Riddim) (2010)
- "Talk Bout That" (Costra Nostra Riddim) (2010)
- "Volume (Remix)" ft. Point O (2011)
- "Tell Me Nut’n" (Monkey Barrel Riddim) (2012)
- "Step When Yuh Ready" (2012)
- "Mek It Bunx Up" ft. Marcy Chin (2013)
- "Your Got Me" ft. C.K (2013)
- "Jamdown Start Up" (Party Crumbz Riddim) (2014)
- "Benn Up" (2015)
- "In the Ghetto" (2016)
- "Ribbibunx" (2017)
- "Life Still Ah Keep" (2017)
- "Put It Pon Me" (ft. Natel) (2018)
- "Tun Suh" (2018)
- "Back It Up, Drop It" (2019)
- "Bubble & Bunx" ft. Don Elektron (2020)
- "Milkshake and Jello" ft. Amenazandel (2021)

Featured Artist

- "Dynamite" - PARRI$ (Parris Goebel) ft. DeeWunn - Vicious album
- "Mic Magician" – Ward 21 / Marcy Chin / DeeWunn - Germaica / Nothing Unusual album
- "Nothing Unusual" - Ward 21 / Point O / DeeWunn, produced by Kunley (Ward 21), Wiletunes
- "Pepper Pot Ting" – Ward 21 / DeeWunn, produced by South Rakkas, Topp Entertainment
- "You Hate Me" – Tifa / DeeWunn (Get Bex Riddim), produced by Kunley (Ward 21), Wiletunes
- "Streets on Fire" - T.O.K / Ward 21 / C.K / DeeWunn, produced by Kunley (Ward 21), Wiletunes
- "Walking on Air" – LOC (Tony Locinto) / DeeWunn
- "Nuh Sleep" – Ward 21 / DeeWunn (TakeOver Riddim), produced by Corey Todd, Notnice Records

=== Mixtapes ===
- 2015 - Scrapbook - The Lost Tapes
- 2015 - Banggaz II
- 2014 – Banggaz – The Playlist Mix
- 2013 - #MiBadYuhFuck Vol. 2
- 2012 - #MidBadYuhFuck
- 2011 - When Darkness Fallz
- 2010 - Lungz on Fyah
- 2009 - D.E.E
- 2008 - Me & Mine
- 2007 - Truthfulli Speakin’
