= Hollie-May Saker =

British fashion model

- Born: 1994 or 1995 (age 31–32); Anfield, Liverpool, England
- Occupation: Fashion model
- Modelling information
- Height: 1.78 m (5 ft 10 in)
- Hair colour: Blonde
- Eye colour: Blue
- Agency: Elite Model Management (Paris, Copenhagen); d' Management Group (Milan); View Management (Barcelona); Modellink (Gothenburg); Model Management (Hamburg); Stockholmsgruppen (Stockholm); Vivien's Model Management (Sydney); Models 1 (London) (mother agency)

Hollie-May Saker is a British fashion model.

== Early life and career ==
Saker was born in Liverpool, England, and grew up in Marbella, Spain, before the family returned to Liverpool when she was a teenager. She was discovered in Marbella, and signed with Models 1 and the now-defunct Trump Model Management. On the runway she has walked for Marc Jacobs, Louis Vuitton, Tory Burch, Marchesa, Vivienne Westwood, Dolce & Gabbana, Burberry, Miu Miu, Fendi, Just Cavalli, Roberto Cavalli, Giorgio Armani, Versace, Chanel, Kenzo, Nina Ricci, Sonia Rykiel, Gareth Pugh, Ann Demeulemeester, Rodarte, Alberta Ferretti, Prabal Gurung, Tommy Hilfiger, and Valentino.

She has appeared in campaigns for Blumarine, Lanvin, Moschino, H&M, Gap, and River Island. Saker has been on the cover of Vogue Italia, Harper's Bazaar UK, and Wonderland among others, with appearances in editorials for British Vogue, Miss Vogue, American Vogue, V, The Guardian, Dazed, Elle France and Japan, CR FASHION BOOK, and Love.

At the 2013 Paris Fashion Week, she got into a physical altercation with Femen protesters after they grabbed her arm. She was wearing for designer Nina Ricci at the time.
