= Katie Moore (model) =

American fashion model

- Born: Katherine Ann Moore; July 4, 1997 (age 28); Houston, Texas, U.S.
- Modeling information
- Height: 1.80 m (5 ft 11 in)
- Hair color: Blonde
- Eye color: Blue
- Agency: Marilyn Agency (New York); MP Management (Paris); Special Management (Milan); Established Models (London); Trend Model Management (Barcelona); SPIN Model Management (Hamburg); Page Parkes (Houston); Photogenics LA (Los Angeles)

Katherine Ann Moore (born July 4, 1997) is an American fashion model.

== Early life ==
Katherine Ann Moore was born in Houston, Texas. In high school, she heavily participated in musical theatre and acting.

== Career ==
Moore started modeling at age 17. She debuted as a semi-exclusive for Alexander Wang opening his F/W 2016 fashion show with a distinctive red haircut given to her by the famous British hairstylist Guido Palau. She was signed to the now-defunct agency Trump Model Management but notably left the agency shortly before it folded; she then signed with the Marilyn Agency.

She has walked for Chanel, Yves Saint Laurent, Kenzo, Rick Owens, Stella McCartney, Givenchy, Balenciaga, Off-White, Dries van Noten, Emilio Pucci, and Giambattista Valli among others. She has appeared in Vogue, Allure, Vogue Japan, Vogue Italia, Vogue Mexico, Vogue Taiwan, Vogue Russia, Vogue Korea, W, Dazed, and Numéro.

She has appeared in advertisements for Warby Parker, Sephora, Saks Fifth Avenue, Barbara Bui, and Alexander Wang.
