= Left of Boom =

Memoir by Douglas Laux

Left of Boom: How a Young CIA Case Officer Penetrated the Taliban and Al-Qaeda
- First edition
- Author: Douglas Laux; Ralph Pezzullo
- Language: English
- Subject: Espionage, War in Afghanistan, Syrian Civil War
- Genre: Non-fiction
- Publisher: St. Martin's Press
- Publication date: April 5, 2016 (hardcover)
- Publication place: United States
- Pages: 320 pages
- ISBN: 978-1-250-08136-0
- OCLC: 907965926
- Dewey Decimal: 958.104/78
- LC Class: DS371.413 .S66

Left of Boom: How a Young CIA Case Officer Penetrated the Taliban and Al-Qaeda is a memoir by Douglas Laux, a former case officer for the Central Intelligence Agency, and Ralph Pezzullo.

== Background ==
The book details the experiences of Douglas Laux, who served for seven years as an undercover case officer for the CIA, first in southern Afghanistan and later in the Middle East, particularly Syria. The book was heavily redacted by the CIA prior to publication.

The phrase "left of boom" is a military idiom that refers the U.S. military's effort to disrupt insurgent cells before they can build and plant bombs.

== Overview ==
Left of Boom describes Laux's time as a case officer in Afghanistan, which included a tour in Afghanistan during the Afghan surge and another to Kandahar during the operation that killed Osama bin Laden. As an undercover case officer, Laux was trained in Pashto prior to his deployment along the Afghanistan-Pakistan border, however, Laux writes the dialect of Pashto he learned was not spoken in the region, thus making communication with local assets initially difficult. The role that Pakistan's Directorate for Inter-Services Intelligence played during this time is alluded to, but Pakistan is never specifically mentioned in the book.

Laux writes about his time in Syria meeting with leaders of the Syrian rebellion in 2012 with the goal of removing Bashar al-Assad from power. Frustrated by the Obama administration's decision to reject the CIA's plans to oust Assad in December 2012, Laux resigned from the CIA in early 2013.

Laux also discusses the strain that being an undercover agent had on his personal relationships, saying, "the closest to me were always suspicious." Laux developed addictions to alcohol and oxycontin as a way of coping with operational setbacks and the struggles of his double life, adding, "I didn't handle it well."

== Reception ==
In an official statement released after publication, the CIA commented on Left of Boom, "Sadly, Mr. Laux’s career at the CIA did not work out," it said in a statement. "We hope that someday, maybe with age and greater maturity, he will have better perspective on his time here." Reviewing Left of Boom, the New York Times said, "The collective weight of all C.I.A. memoirs written since the Sept. 11, 2001, attacks could collapse a bookshelf, but Mr. Laux brings a raw perspective to the canon."
