= FashionUnited =

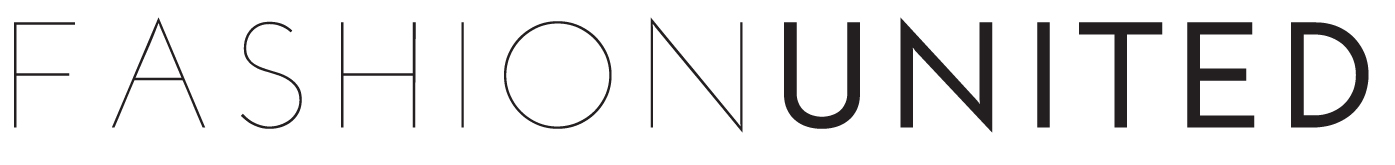
- Industry: Media; Fashion
- Founded: Amsterdam, Netherlands (1999; 27 years ago)
- Founder: Lennard Minderhoud
- Headquarters: Amsterdam, Netherlands
- Area served: Worldwide
- Key people: Lennard Minderhoud, Director-general
- Services: Fashion jobs, fashion news, education network
- Number of employees: 51-200 employees
- Website: fashionunited.uk

FashionUnited is an international B2B fashion platform created in 1999 by CEO Lennard Minderhoud.

== History ==
The idea of founding FashionUnited came to Lennard Minderhoud in the late 1990s after he realized that “there was little information about fashion on the internet.” The platform offers fashion news, fashion jobs, the statistics of the industry and a Fashion Education Network created in 2010. The headquarter of FashionUnited is located in Amsterdam, Netherlands. The platform is active in more than 25 countries and the website is available in 16 languages.

In the second half of 2014, FashionUnited changed its logo and redesigned all the FashionUnited websites.
