= Melodie Monrose =

French fashion model

- Born: April 13, 1992 (age 33); Martinique, France
- Modeling information
- Height: 1.78 m (5 ft 10 in)
- Hair color: Dark brown
- Eye color: Brown
- Agency: Next Model Management (New York, Paris, Milan, London); Uno Models (Barcelona); Seeds Management GmbH (Berlin); Le Management (Copenhagen, Stockholm); NEW Scouting & Management (Queens)

Melodie Monrose is a French fashion model from Martinique.

== Career ==
Monrose began her modeling career in 2010 at the age of 18, when she was discovered by Your Angels Models, a local modeling agency in her native Martinique. Just weeks after signing with Your Angels Models Monrose began working with Wilhelmina in New York and Silent models in Paris. Debuting during the S/S 2011 collections in New York, Monrose has since walked the runway for top designers including Michael Kors, Bottega Veneta, Lanvin, Miu Miu, and Yves Saint Laurent. After her first runway season Monrose was named a top 10 new face by Style.com, Models.com, and COACD. In July 2011 Monrose left Wilhelmina for Silent models, which now represents her in both New York and Paris.

Monrose has appeared in Vogue Italia, Harper's Bazaar, Vogue Turkey, Interview, Dazed, and V. She was photographed by Mario Testino for the F/W 2011 D&G ad campaign.

== Personal life ==
Before becoming a model Monrose dreamed of a career as a designer. Deeply interested in fashion, in a January 2011 interview with Vogue Italia she named John Galliano, Zac Posen, Tom Ford, and Marc Jacobs as her favorite designers.
