= Parris Goebel =

New Zealand dancer and choreographer (born 1991)

Parris Goebel MNZM
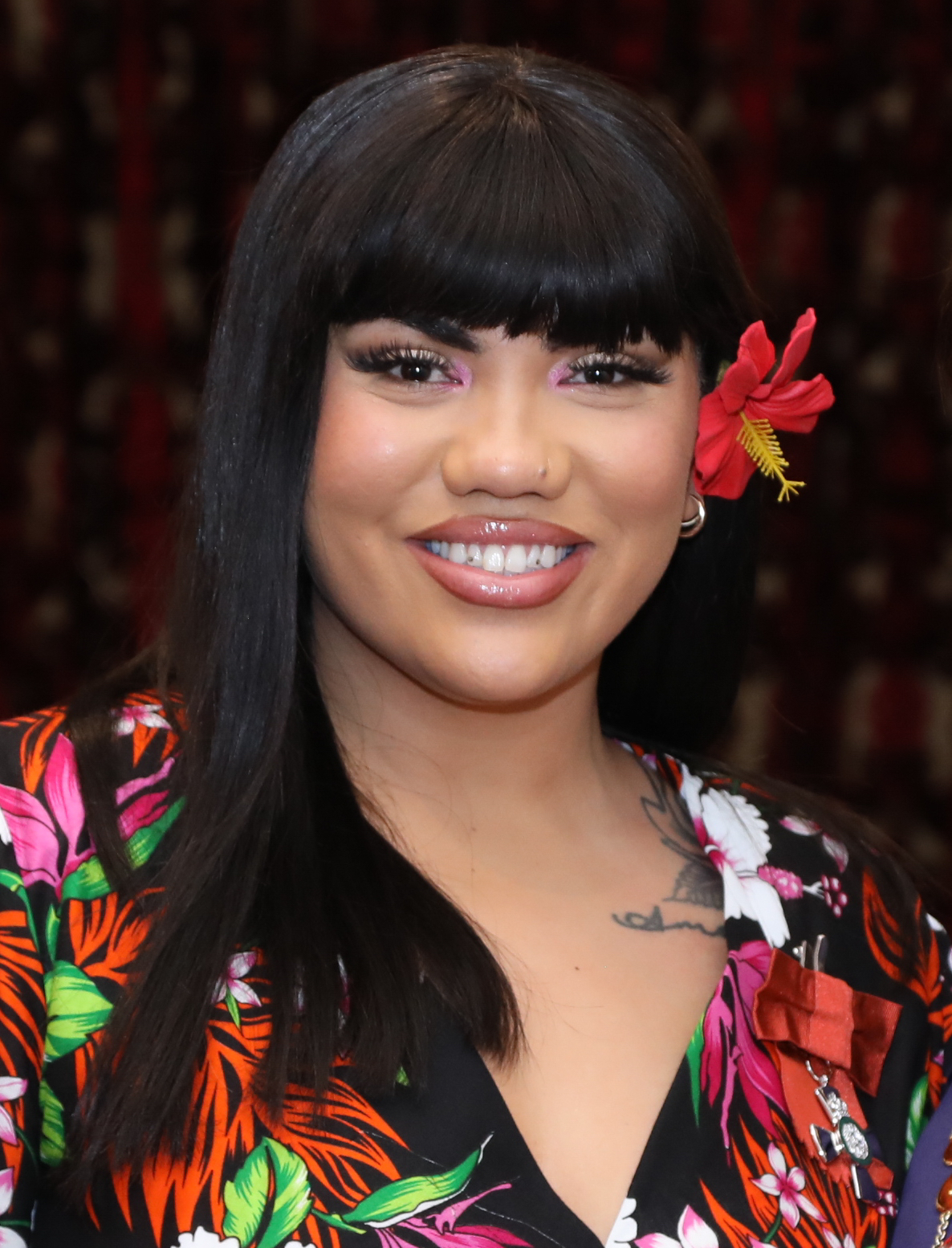
- Goebel in 2020
- Born: Parris Renee Goebel; 29 October 1991 (age 35); Manurewa, New Zealand
- Education: Auckland Girls' Grammar School
- Occupations: Dancer; choreographer; director; singer; actress
- Years active: 2009–present
- Father: Brett Goebel

Parris Renee Goebel MNZM (/ˈɡoʊbəl/; born 29 October 1991), also known mononymously as Parris, is a New Zealand dancer and choreographer. She is the founder and main choreographer of the Palace Dance Studio, which has produced dance crews such as ReQuest, Sorority, Bubblegum, and the Royal Family. The last has won the World Hip Hop Dance Championship three times in a row, becoming the first dance crew in history to achieve it.

She has worked alongside multiple mainstream artists including Karol G, Rihanna, Mylène Farmer, Jennifer Lopez, Normani and Lady Gaga; and has choreographed the music videos for "What Do You Mean?" "Sorry" and "Yummy" by Justin Bieber, "Touch" by Little Mix, "Level Up" by Ciara, "How Do You Sleep?" by Sam Smith, and "Abracadabra" by Lady Gaga.

Goebel was nominated for the MTV Video Music Award for Video of the Year as a director on "Sorry" by Justin Bieber. She has also earned three Primetime Emmy Award nominations for her choreography work on the Amazon Prime Video television specials Savage X Fenty Show, Savage X Fenty Show: Vol. 2, and Savage X Fenty: Vol. 3 by Rihanna, and won the Primetime Emmy Award for Outstanding Choreography for the latter.

== Early life ==
Goebel is of Samoan, Chinese, and Scottish descent, and grew up in South Auckland. She was interested in dance from a young age and started hip-hop dance lessons when she was 10. When she was 15, she started the dance group ReQuest with four friends. Initially they practiced in Goebel's aunt's garage and later at her father's warehouse. After a year working together, they went to the Monsters of Hip Hop Dance Convention in the United States and Goebel was selected to dance in the finale performance of the convention.

Following the convention, Goebel left Auckland Girls' Grammar School to concentrate on her dancing.

== Career ==
Goebel has worked with artists including Ciara, Ariana Grande, Lady Gaga, Little Mix, Justin Bieber, Rihanna, Janet Jackson, Jennifer Lopez, Nicki Minaj, BigBang, BlackPink, 2NE1, CL, Taeyang, iKon and the french superstar Mylène Farmer. Her work has included choreographing routines and starring in music videos and movies. One of her notable successes was her work choreographing the music video for Justin Bieber's 2015 song "Sorry", which as of January 2020 is the 8th most viewed video on YouTube with more than 3 billion views. The video later won the "Video of the Year" award at the 2016 American Music Awards. Goebel went on to choreograph and direct all thirteen of Justin Bieber's Purpose: The Movement videos. These videos have totaled over 5.3 billion views combined as of January 2020.

Goebel and her father, who is also her manager, run The Palace Dance Studio in Auckland.

In 2012, Goebel starred on both America's Best Dance Crew and Dancing With the Stars Australia. She then worked on Jennifer Lopez's 2012 world tour and performed with her on the American Idol season 11 finale. Goebel went on to choreograph and take on a role in the American 3D dance film Step Up: All In, released on 8 August 2014.

In 2015, her choreography for DeeWunn's "Mek It Bunx Up" went viral and, as of January 2020, has received over 15 million views on YouTube.

In 2015, Goebel was the leading choreographer for New Zealand's first hip-hop feature film, Born to Dance.

In 2016, Goebel toured across Europe to multiple destinations, (Italy, France, Holland, Belgium), with her dance company The Royal Family.

In 2019, she choreographed Mylène Farmer's nine-show residency at Paris La Défense Arena in 2019. She appeared in Farmer's behind-the-scenes documentary L'Ultime Création on Amazon Prime Video. That year she also choreographed Rihanna’s Savage X Fenty Show promoting her lingerie line, which was featured in a documentary regarding the making of the show on Amazon Prime Video.

In 2020, Goebel choreographed Jennifer Lopez's and Shakira's Super Bowl halftime show.

In 2023, Goebel choreographed Rihanna's Super Bowl LVII halftime show. That year she also choreographed Mylène Farmer's Nevermore 2023 the biggest stadium tour by a french female singer in history.

In 2024, Goebel choreographed Doja Cat’s headlining Coachella performance and Lady Gaga’s music video for her comeback single, “Disease”.

In 2025, Lady Gaga's music video for "Abracadabra" was released featuring choreography by Goebel, who also contributed to Gaga’s headlining Coachella performance the same year as creative director and choreographer.

=== Music ===
On 8 August 2016 Goebel released her first music video to the song "Friday", which was then featured on her EP Vicious. Later in August 2016, she released a music video for "Nasty", which is also featured on the EP.

In December 2016 she eventually released Vicious, which featured artists including Jamaican Dancehall star, DeeWunn.

=== Style ===
Goebel is known for her particular style, known as Polyswagg. As she describes it, her style is based on hearing, breathing and living the music, being passionate while dancing and transmitting feelings. She also draws on music inspirations from the DanceHall style. Large amounts of her routines include this element, most notably in the Royal Family's World Hip Hop Dance Championship performances. Her style has been described as raw and instinctive.

=== Publication ===
In March 2018, Goebel published her autobiography Young Queen.

== World Hip-Hop Dance Championships ==
Palace Dance Studios crews and their records in the annual competition.

Name of Crew	ReQuest	The Royal Family Dance Crew	Sorority	Bubblegum	Duchesses	Kings	Royal Family Varsity	Kingsmen
Year founded	2007	2009	2010	2010	2014	2015	2016	2017
2009	Gold	—	—	—	—	—	—	—
2010	Gold	—	Bronze	5th Place at Worlds	—	—	—	—
2011	Silver	Gold	Gold	Gold	—	—	—	—
2012	—	Gold	Silver	Gold	—	—	—	—
2013	—	Gold	Bronze	Silver	—	—	—	—
2014	Guest Performance at Nationals	Guest Performance at Nationals	8th Place at Worlds	Bronze	Silver	—	—	—
2015	—	Silver	4th Place at Worlds	4th Place at Worlds	6th Place at Worlds	2nd Place at Nationals	—	—
2016	—	—	—	Bronze	—	—	Bronze	—
2017	—	—	9th Place at Worlds	5th Place at Worlds	—	—	10th Place at Worlds	2nd Place at Nationals
2018	—	Guest Performance at Nationals	—	8th Place at Worlds	—	—	—	—
2019	—	4th place at Worlds	—	Guest Performance at National Prelims	—	—	—	—
2020								
2021								
2022								
2023			7th place at Nationals					

== Work ==
=== Films; As Actress ===
Year	Title	Role	Notes
2014	Step Up: All In	Violet	

=== Films; As Crew ===
Year	Title	Work		Notes
Year	Title	Director	Choreographer	Notes
2014	Step Up: All In	No	Yes	
2014	Jennifer Lopez: Dance Again	No	Yes	Television Film
2015	Born to Dance	No	Yes	
2015	Purpose: The Movement	Yes	Yes	Short Film
2024	This Is Me... Now: A Love Story	No	Yes	

=== Specials ===
Year	Title	Work	Notes
Year	Title	Choreographer	Notes
2018-2022	Savage X Fenty Show	Yes	
2020	Super Bowl LIV halftime show	Yes	
2023	Super Bowl LVII halftime show	Yes	

=== Music Videos ===
Year	Title	Work		Artist(s)	Album
Year	Title	Director	Choreographer	Artist(s)	Album
2015	Sorry	Yes	Yes	Justin Bieber	Purpose
2016	Touch	No	Yes	Little Mix	Glory Days
2018	Level Up	Yes	Yes	Ciara	Beauty Marks
2019	How Do You Sleep?	No	Yes	Sam Smith	Non-album single
2020	Friends	No	Yes	Monica, Ty Dolla $ign	Non-album single
2025	Abracadabra	Yes	Yes	Lady Gaga	Mayhem
2025	The Dead Dance	No	Yes	Lady Gaga	Mayhem
2026	Runway	Yes	Yes	Lady Gaga, Doechii	Non-album single

== Awards and nominations ==
=== Emmy Awards ===
Year	Category	Work	Result	Ref.
2020	Outstanding Choreography for Variety or Reality Programming	Savage X Fenty Show	Nominated	
2021	Outstanding Choreography for Variety or Reality Programming	Savage X Fenty Show Vol. 2	Nominated	
2022	Outstanding Choreography for Variety or Reality Programming	Savage X Fenty Show Vol. 3	Won	
2023	Outstanding Choreography for Variety or Reality Programming	Savage X Fenty Show Vol. 4	Nominated	
2025	Outstanding Choreography for Variety or Reality Programming	Beyoncé Bowl	Nominated	

=== MTV Video Music Awards ===
Year	Category	Work	Result	Ref.
2016	Video of the Year	Sorry	Nominated	
2016	Best Long Form Video	Purpose: The Movement	Nominated	
2025	Best Direction	Abracadabra	Won	
2025	Best Choreography	Abracadabra	Nominated	

=== Miscellaneous awards and honors ===
Year	Award	Category	Work	Result	Ref.
2006	Creative New Zealand Arts Pasifika Awards	Special Recognition Award	Herself	Honored	
2009	Street Dance New Zealand	Choreographer of the Year	Herself	Won	
2009	Street Dance New Zealand	Dancer of the Year	Herself	Won	
2014	World Of Dance Awards	Female Choreographer of the Year	Herself	Won	
2015	Variety Artists Club of New Zealand Inc	Top Variety Artist Award	Herself	Won	
2015	New Zealand Women of Influence Awards	Young Leader	Herself	Won	
2016	World Of Dance Awards	Female Choreographer of the Year	Herself	Won	
2016	World Of Dance Awards	Live Performance of the Year	Herself	Won	

- In 2016, the advertisement that she choreographed for New Zealand Post won Worst Ad 2016 in the TVNZ Fair Go Ad Awards
- In the 2020 New Year Honours, Goebel was appointed a Member of the New Zealand Order of Merit, for services to dance.
