= Indira Scott =

American fashion model (born 1997)

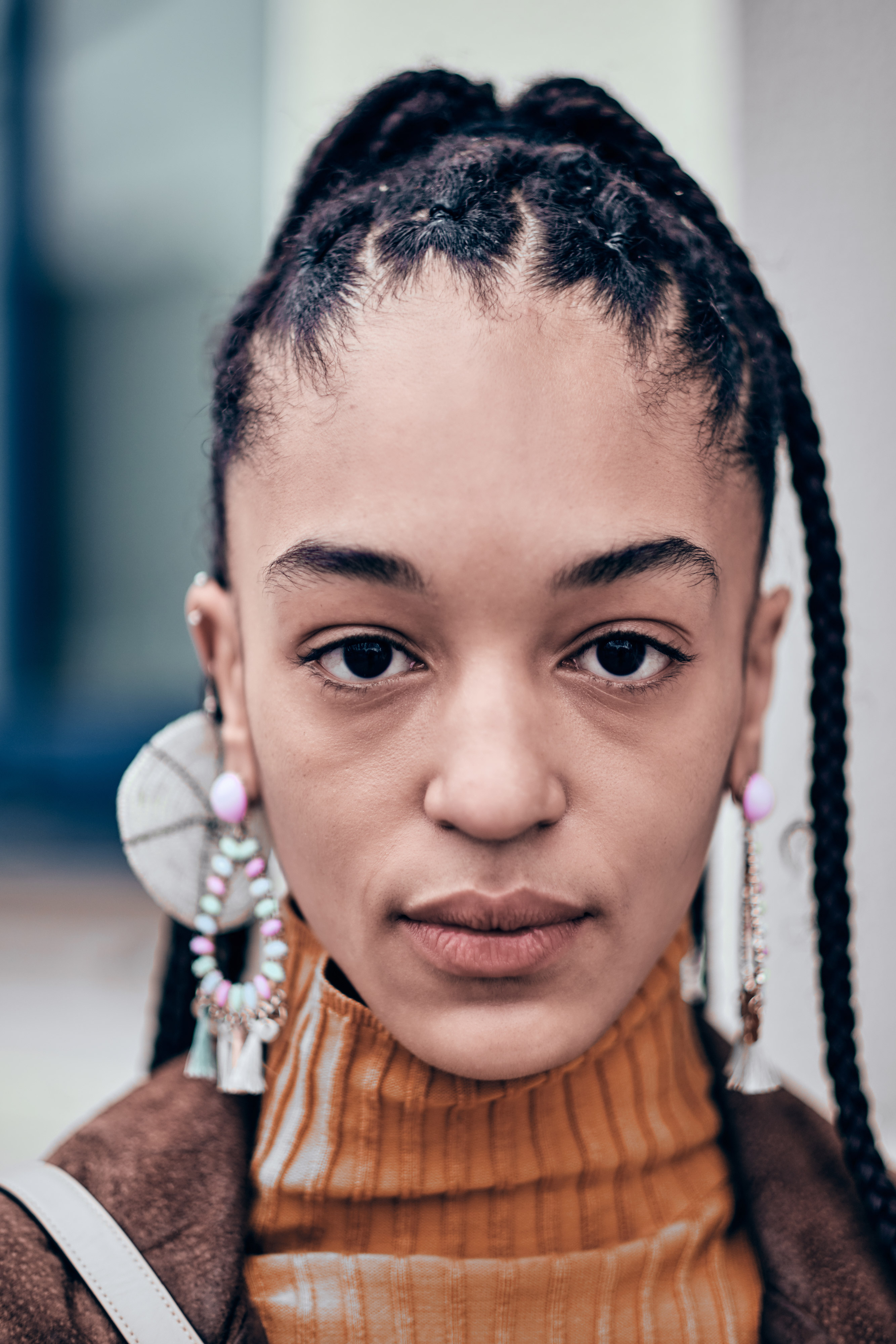
- Scott in 2019
- Born: Indira Lynn Scott; May 27, 1997 (age 29); New York City, U.S.
- Modeling information
- Height: 1.80 m (5 ft 11 in)
- Hair color: Brown
- Eye color: Brown
- Agency: DNA Models (New York); Silent Models (Paris); Why Not Model Management (Milan); Anti Agency (London)

Indira Lynn Scott (born May 27, 1997) is an American fashion model. She closed Dior's F/W 18 Haute Couture show in her debut season. Indira was on a cover of Vogue.

== Early life ==
Scott was born in Jamaica, Queens.

== Career ==
Scott was discovered while working at The Reformation. She has modeled for Dior, Altuzarra, Balmain, SavagexFenty, Michael Kors, Oscar de la Renta, Prabal Gurung, Ralph Lauren, Opening Ceremony, Sonia Rykiel, and Coach New York. She has appeared in V magazine and Office magazine.

She is represented by DNA Models.

Models.com selected Scott as a “Top Newcomer” for her debut season. She also ranks on their "Hot List". Scott has frequently expressed her passion for environmental sustainability. In 2020, she modelled for a collection of pendants made with natural diamonds created for a charity auction.
