= Canada in the Eurovision Song Contest =

- Eurovision Song Contest
- Participating broadcaster: Canadian Broadcasting Corporation (CBC/Radio-Canada)

Participation summary
- Appearances: 1 (upcoming)
- First appearance: 2027
- Participation history: 2027

External links
- CBC official homepage
- Canada's page at Eurovision.com

Canada is set to make its debut at the Eurovision Song Contest in 2027, represented by the Canadian Broadcasting Corporation (CBC/Radio-Canada) as the participating broadcaster. It will be the first country from the Americas to join the contest, and the second from outside the European Broadcasting Area, following Australia.

== Background ==
The Canadian Broadcasting Corporation (CBC/Radio-Canada) has a long-standing relationship with the European Broadcasting Union (EBU), of which it had been an associate member since the union's creation in 1950. CBC/Radio-Canada became the first EBU associate member to be invited to participate in a Eurovision event, when it entered Eurovision Young Dancers in 1987 and 1989. It was the only EBU associate member invited to any Eurovision event until Australia's Special Broadcasting Service (SBS) was invited to participate in the Eurovision Song Contest in 2015.

Although Canada had not participated in the Eurovision Song Contest in its own right, several Canadian artists had represented other countries: Sherisse Laurence represented Luxembourg in 1986, Céline Dion won for Switzerland in 1988, Lara Fabian represented Luxembourg in 1988, Annie Cotton represented Switzerland in 1993, Natasha St-Pier represented France in 2001, Rykka represented Switzerland in 2016, Katerine Duska represented Greece in 2019, and La Zarra represented France in 2023. Additionally, Laurell Barker has co-written several entries for various countries, and Corneille wrote the entry for France in 2006.

Following the launch of the American Song Contest in 2022, the EBU announced on 25 April 2022 that it would expand the Eurovision brand into North America by creating Eurovision Canada. Through Voxovation, which holds the license to adapt the Eurovision format for other territories, it partnered with Canadian production company Insight Productions to develop the competition, with plans for the inaugural edition to take place in 2023. The competition was designed to feature musical acts representing each of Canada's ten provinces and three territories, and consist of televised qualifying rounds, semi-finals and a live final. Artists were expected to perform original songs, with the winner determined by a combination of public voting and a jury of music industry professionals. The project experienced delays and a prolonged lack of updates from organisers throughout 2023 and 2024. In May 2025, a spokesperson for CBC/Radio-Canada confirmed that Eurovision Canada had been shelved. Following consultations with various industry stakeholders, the broadcaster determined that the logistical and financial demands of producing a multi-week, live national touring competition across Canada were "prohibitively expensive".

In November 2025, the Canadian government led by Prime Minister Mark Carney published its budget for 2025; included in it is a section where the government would work with CBC/Radio-Canada to explore a potential participation in the Eurovision Song Contest. The broadcaster's news division reported that Carney himself was "personally involved in the push", according to two government sources.

At its 96th general assembly in Prague, Czech Republic, on 25 June 2026, the EBU approved a revision of its statutes. Historically, full EBU membership required the broadcasters' countries to fall within the European Broadcasting Area (EBA) or hold membership in the Council of Europe (CoE). The approved changes created a new membership framework, allowing public broadcasters from countries outside the EBA or that are not members of the CoE to obtain full membership, provided they meet core CoE standards and their country maintain a formal observer status with the CoE. As Canada is a CoE observer state, the statutory change made CBC/Radio-Canada eligible for full EBU integration. The assembly subsequently voted to accept CBC/Radio-Canada as a full EBU member, granting the broadcaster immediate rights to apply for any Eurovision event without a special invitation.

On 1 July 2026, Canada Day, the EBU and CBC/Radio-Canada released a joint announcement confirming that Canada would make its debut at the Eurovision Song Contest 2027 in Bulgaria. In August, the CBC announced the start of the artist selection process, with applications open from 31 August to 9 September before a public and jury process decides the winner. The song that the chosen artist will perform at the contest will be "developed" later.

The CBC/Radio-Canada subsequently clarified that future years may see the launch of a televised national final, but that it was not possible to organise one in 2026 due to the limited time frame. It also clarified that the song will include both English and French lyrics, although the winning artist will be able to bring in a guest collaborator if they are not fluent in one of the languages rather than necessarily having to be bilingual.

In October 2026, the CBC announced the five finalists to represent Canada in the 2027 competition as William Cloutier, Josiane Comeau, Rêve, Talk and Tyler Shaw. The five participated in an online vote, with the winner expected to be announced in December.

== Participation overview ==
Table key
1	First place
2	Second place
3	Third place
◇	Entry selected but did not compete
†	Upcoming event

Year	Artist	Song	Language	Final	Points	Semi	Points
2027	Confirmed intention to participate †						

== Related involvement ==
=== Heads of delegation ===
Each participating broadcaster in the Eurovision Song Contest assigns a head of delegation as the EBU's contact person and the leader of their delegation at the event. The delegation, whose size can greatly vary, includes a head of press, the performers, songwriters, composers, and backing vocalists, among others. At the 2027 contest, the Canadian head of delegation will be Jennifer Dettman.

=== Broadcasts ===
Year	Channel(s)	Commentator(s)	Ref.
1977	CBC-FM (Note: Delayed two-part broadcast on 9 and 16 August 1977 at 13:00 ( EDT))	Mieke Hollenbach	
1978–1987	No television broadcast		
1988	Radio-Canada (Note: Delayed broadcast in a shortened format on 30 May 1988 at 19:00 (EDT))	Céline Dion and René Angélil	
1989	TV5 Québec Canada (Note: Deferred broadcast at 20:00 (EDT))	Unknown	
1990	Unknown	Unknown	
1991–1997	No television broadcast		
1998	Unknown	Unknown	
1999	TV5 Québec Canada (Note: Deferred broadcast)	Unknown	
2000	TV5 Québec Canada (Note: Deferred broadcast at 00:15 (EDT))	Unknown	
2001	No television broadcast		
2002	TV5 Québec Canada (Note: Deferred broadcast at 22:05 (EDT))	Unknown	
2003–2013	No television broadcast		
2014	OutTV (Note: OutTV broadcast the three shows in Canada between 20–22 June 2014.)	Adam Rollins and Tommy D.	
2015	OutTV	Adam Rollins and Tommy D.	
2016–2018	No television broadcast		
2019	Omni Television (Note: Omni Television aired all three shows on a six hour delay.)	No commentary	
2020	~~Omni Television~~	Not announced before cancellation	
2021	Omni Television	No commentary	
2022–2026	No television broadcast		
2027	CBC/Radio-Canada	TBA	

== See also ==
- Canada in the OTI Festival
