= Audien discography =

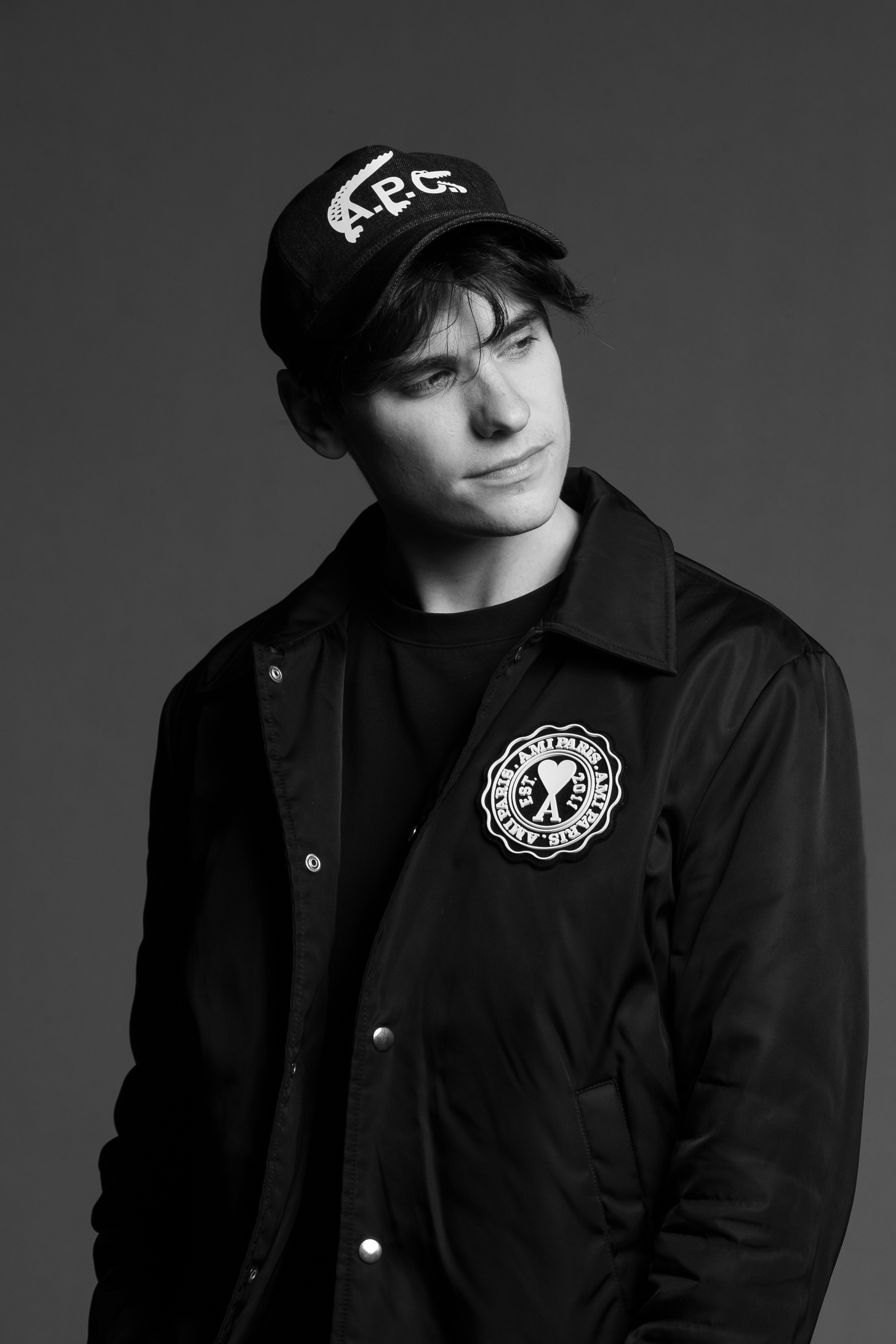
- Audien at Resorts World, 2023
- Studio albums: 1
- EPs: 4
- Singles: 36
- Music videos: 4
- Remixes: 33

This is the discography of American DJ and producer Audien. He has released two studio albums, four extended plays, 34 singles, 33 remixes, and four music videos.

== Studio albums ==
Title	Details
Escapism	Released: November 8, 2019; Label: Self-released; Formats: CD, digital download
First Love	Released: October 3, 2025; Label: Armada Music; Formats: CD, digital download

== Extended plays ==
List of extended plays, showing release details
Title	Details	Track listing
Transition	Released: May 4, 2010; Label: Enhanced Progressive; Format: Digital download	List: 1. "Transition"; 2. "Course Of Action"; 3. "Transition (Paul Tarrant Remix)"
Nightfall / Daybreak (with Griff O'Neill)	Released: January 17, 2011; Label: Enhanced Music; Format: Digital download	List: 1. "Nightfall"; 2. "Daybreak"
Daydreams	Released: August 28, 2015; Label: Astralwerks; Format: Digital download	List: 1. "Something Better" (featuring Lady Antebellum)"; 2. "Pharaohs" (featuring Voyageur); 3. "Rooms"; 4. "Monaco" (featuring Rumors)
Some Ideas	Released: September 15, 2017; Label: Astralwerks; Format: Digital download	List: 1. "Message"; 2. "Rampart" (with Gammar); 3. "Resolve"

== Singles ==
List of singles with selected chart positions, showing year released, album name, and release label
Title	Year	Peak chart positions			Album	Label
Title	Year	BEL	US Club	US Dance	Album	Label
"Rise & Shine"	2009	—	—	—	Non-album singles	Flashover Recordings
"November"	2010	—	—	—	Non-album singles	Ask4 Records
"Eleven Eleven"	2010	—	—	—	Non-album singles	Enhanced Progressive
"Mind Over Matter"	2010	—	—	—	Once Upon A Night, Vol. 2	Aleph
"Palmetto"	2010	—	—	—	Non-album singles	Perceptive Deep
"What Dreams May Come"	2010	—	—	—	Non-album singles	Songbird
"Fall into Place"	2010	—	—	—	Non-album singles	Aleph
"Behind Our Thoughts" (with Decolita)	2010	—	—	—	Non-album singles	Alter Ego Music
"Someday" (with Jason van Wyk)	2011	—	—	—	Non-album singles	First State Music
"People Do Not Change"	2011	—	—	—	Non-album singles	Enhanced Progressive
"Selective Hearing"	2011	—	—	—	Non-album singles	First State Deep
"Triumph" (with Norin & Rad)	2011	—	—	—	Non-album singles	Air Up There Recordings
"Thrust" (with Norin & Rad)	2011	—	—	—	Cycles 3	Air Up There Recordings
"Keep This Memory"	2012	—	—	—	Non-album single	Enhanced Progressive
"These Are The Days" (featuring Ruby Prophet)	2012	—	—	—	Non-album single	Zouk Recordings
"The Reach"	2012	—	—	—	Non-album single	Enhanced Progressive
"Eventide"	2012	—	—	—	Non-album single	Anjunabeats
"Unity"	2012	—	—	—	Non-album single	Anjunabeats
"Play Our Lives" (featuring Cerf, Mitiska and Jaren)	2012	—	—	—	Give Me a Sound	ARVA
"Sup"	2012	—	—	—	Non-album single	Trice Recordings
"Wayfarer"	2013	—	—	—	Anjunabeats Volume 10	Anjunabeats
"Leaving You" (featuring Michael S.)	2013	—	—	—	Non-album singles	Zouk Recordings
"Ciao"	2013	—	—	—	Non-album singles	Trice Recordings
"Iris"	2013	—	—	—	Non-album singles	Anjunabeats
"Circles" (featuring Ruby Prophet)	2013	—	—	—	Non-album singles	Zouk Recordings
"Elysium"	2014	65	—	—	Non-album singles	Spinnin' Records
"Hindsight"	2014	—	—	—	Anjunabeats Volume 11	Anjunabeats
"Serotonin" (featuring Matthew Koma)	2014	—	—	—	Non-album singles	Spinnin' Records
"Insomnia" (featuring Parson James)	2015	—	1	32	Non-album singles	Astralwerks
"Something Better" (featuring Lady Antebellum)	2015	—	1	10	Daydreams	Astralwerks
"Crazy Love" (featuring Deb's Daughter)	2016	—	—	25	Non-album singles	Astralwerks
"One More Weekend" (with MAX)	2017	—	—	43	Non-album singles	Astralwerks
"Hot Water" (with 3lau)	2017	—	—	—	Non-album singles	Astralwerks
"Higher" (featuring Cecilia Gault)	2018	—	—	—	Non-album singles	Anjunabeats
"Never Letting Go" (with Arty)	2018	—	—	—	Non-album singles	Anjunabeats
"Rollercoaster" (featuring Liam O'Donnell)	2018	—	—	—	Non-album singles	Cranberry Records
"Favorite Sound" (with Echosmith)	2019	—	7	34	Escapism	Cranberry Records
"Buzzing" (featuring Nevve)	2019	—	—	—	Escapism	Self-released
"Reach" (featuring Jamie Hartman)	2019	—	—	—	Escapism	Self-released
"Craving" (with Arty featuring Ellee Duke)	2020	—	—	—	Non-album singles	Armada Music
"Learn to Love Again"	2021	—	—	—	Non-album singles	Armada Music
"Blue"	2021	—	—	—	Non-album singles	Armada Music
"Wish It Was You" (featuring Cate Downey)	2021	—	—	—	Non-album singles	Armada Music
"One Last Dance" (featuring Xira)	2022	—	—	—	Non-album singles	Armada Music
"Drifting Away" (featuring Joe Jury)	2022	—	—	—	Non-album singles	Armada Music
"Antidote" (with Codeko featuring JT Roach)	2023	—	—	—	Non-album singles	Armada Music
"—" denotes a recording that did not chart or was not released.

== As featured artist ==
Year	Title	Album	Label
2018	"This Is How We Do It" (Party Pupils featuring Audien)	Non-album single	Dim Mak Records

== Remixes ==
Title	Year	Artist(s)	Label
"Reaction" (Audien Remix)	2010	Lewis Dodkins	Harmonic Breeze Recordings
"Sunset Serenade" (Audien Remix)	2010	Paul Tarrant	Enhanced Progressive
"Your Touch" (Audien Remix)	2010	Matt Holliday featuring Mque	Enhanced Recordings
"Liquid Sky" (Audien Remix)	2010	Pamuya	Alter Ego Recordings
"First Taste" (Audien Remix)	2010	BRM	Same Recordings
"Come Home" (Audien Remix)	2010	Alpha 9	Premier
"My Everything" (Audien Remix)	2010	Peter Lesko (featuring Essence)	Alter Ego Digital
"Sticks & Stones" (Audien Remix)	2010	Phillip Alpha and Daniel Kandi	Enhanced Music
"End of Time" (Audien Remix)	2010	Perpetual (featuring Sandra Passero)	Alter Ego Pure
"Rattle" (Audien Remix)	2010	Ben Nicky	AVA Recordings
"Naiad" (Audien Remix)	2011	Den Rize and Mark Andrez	Future Sound of Egypt
"A Better Daze" (Audien Remix)	2011	JPL	Enhanced Progressive
"Punk" (Audien Remix)	2011	Ferry Corsten	Flashover Recordings
"Who You Are" (Audien's Original Mix)	2011	Natalie Peris	Nervous Records
"Motion" (Audien 'Unconscious' Remix)	2011	Ad Brown	Silk Music
"Medellin" (Audien's Fusion Mix)	2011	Aly & Fila vs. Activa	Armada Music
"If I Could" (Audien Remix)	2011	Nickey	Enhanced Progressive
"Afro Ghost" (Audien Remix)	2011	Life+ (featuring Alma Carlson)	Nervous Records
"Memorize Me" (Audien Remix)	2012	Rune RK and Databoy	ArtiFarti Records
"As Long As You Love Me" (Audien Dubstep and Luvstep Mix)	2012	Justin Bieber featuring Big Sean	The Island Def Jam
"Multiverse" (Audien Remix)	2012	Jaytech	Anjunabeats
"Cool Without You" (Audien Remix)	2013	Tommie Sunshine and The Disco Fries (featuring Kid Sister)	Vicious
"Timebomb" (Audien Remix)	2013	Zaa (featuring Molly Bancroft)	Pilot 6 Recordings
"Together We Are" (Audien Remix)	2013	Arty (featuring Chris James)	Big Beat
"Treasure" (Audien Remix)	2013	Bruno Mars	Atlantic Records
"This Is What It Feels Like" (Audien Remix)	2013	Armin van Buuren (featuring Trevor Guthrie)	Armada Music
"Pompeii" (Audien Remix)	2014	Bastille	Virgin Records
"Revolution" (Audien Remix)	2014	R3hab, NERVO and Ummet Ozcan	Spinnin' Records
"Slave to the Rhythm" (Audien Remix)	2014	Michael Jackson	Sony Music
"Chains" (Audien Remix)	2015	Nick Jonas	Island Records
"Adventure of a Lifetime" (Audien Remix)	2016	Coldplay	Self-released
"Colors" (Audien Remix)	2016	Halsey	Astralwerks
"Jump" (Audien Bootleg)	2017	Van Halen	Self-released
"All My Love" (Audien Remix)	2017	Cash Cash	Big Beat
"Giant" (Audien Remix)	2019	Calvin Harris and Rag'n'Bone Man	Sony Music
"Dropout Boulevard" (Audien Remix)	2021	End of the World	Land Music

== Music videos ==
List of music videos, showing year released and directors
Title	Year	Director(s)
"People Do Not Change"	2011	—
"Leaving You" (featuring Michael S.)	2013	—
"Serotonin" (featuring Matthew Koma)	2014	—
"Something Better" (featuring Lady Antebellum)	2015	Will Joines
