= Canada in the Eurovision Song Contest 2027 =

- Eurovision Song Contest 2027
- Participating broadcaster: Canadian Broadcasting Corporation (CBC/Radio-Canada)
- Country: Canada
- Selection process: Artist: Canada's Choice; Song: Internal selection
- Selection date: Artist: 5 December 2026; Song: TBA

Participation chronology

Canada is set to be represented at the Eurovision Song Contest 2027, which will be held in Burgas, Bulgaria. The Canadian participating broadcaster, the Canadian Broadcasting Corporation (CBC/Radio-Canada), is selecting its artist through the online national final Canada's Choice, while the song will be chosen internally. This will be Canada's debut entry in the Eurovision Song Contest.

== Background ==
On 1 July 2026, the EBU and CBC/Radio-Canada released a joint announcement confirming that Canada would make its debut at the Eurovision Song Contest 2027 after the latter had obtained full membership of the European Broadcasting Union (EBU). As part of its duties as participating broadcaster, CBC/Radio-Canada would also organise the selection of its entry in the Eurovision Song Contest and broadcast the event in the country. On 24 August 2026, CBC/Radio-Canada announced that for its 2027 entry, the artist would be selected through a national final while the song would be selected internally.

== Before Eurovision ==
=== Canada's Choice ===
Canada's Choice (French: Le choix du Canada) is the national selection format developed by CBC/Radio-Canada to select its artist for the Eurovision Song Contest 2027.

==== Competing artists ====
On 31 August 2026, the broadcaster opened an application period for interested artists that lasted until 9 September 2026. Applicants were required to be professional artists who are Canadian citizens or permanent residents over the age of 18; preference was given to those with "an existing European footprint" and "an active, highly engaged digital footprint". At the closing of the deadline, 325 applications were received, from which 15 were shortlisted by CBC/Radio-Canada's music teams. Five finalists were selected on 8 October 2026 by a jury consisting of Maurin Auxéméry, Sam Chouinard, Orin Isaacs, Shawn Myers, Élisabeth St-Gelais, Dany Meloul and Douglas Smith, and were revealed on 27 October during an event at the CBC/Radio-Canada studios in Toronto, hosted by Chéli Sauvé-Castonguay and broadcast on CBC TV and Radio-Canada as well as streamed online on CBC Gem, ICI TOU.tv and YouTube.

Participating artists
Name	Location	Style	Background
Josiane	New Brunswick	Pop	Competed on La Voix, the Quebec version of The Voice in 2020. Released an album in 2026.
Rêve	Quebec	Electronic, Dance-pop	Singer/songwriter. Won the Juno Award for Dance Recording of the year in 2023 for her song Ctrl + Alt + Del.
Talk	Ontario	Indie Rock	Singer songwriter active since 2010, with multiple albums and singles released. Known for his 2021 hit "Run Away to Mars".
Tyler Shaw	British Columbia	Pop	
William Cloutier	Quebec	Pop	Won Star Académie in 2021. Has acted in TV and theater.

==== Final ====
Performance videos of the five finalists were posted online on CBC/Radio-Canada's Eurovision Song Contest website on 27 October 2026, where the public could vote for their favourite artist until 5 November at 16:59 CET. The winner will be determined by the combination of votes from a jury and the public online vote, and will be announced on 5 December 2026.

=== Song selection ===
The song to be performed by the winning artist will be selected internally, and will include lyrics in both English and French.

== At Eurovision ==
The Eurovision Song Contest 2027 will take place at the Arena Burgas in Burgas, Bulgaria, and consist of two semi-finals held on the respective dates of 11 and 13 May and the final on 15 May 2027. All nations with the exception of the host country (Bulgaria) and the "Big Four" (France, Germany, Italy and the United Kingdom) will be required to qualify from one of two semi-finals in order to compete for the final; the top ten countries from each semi-final will progress to the final.
