= I Want You to Freak =

Single by Rak-Su
- Released: 28 September 2018
- Recorded: 2018
- Genre: Latin pop; R&B
- Length: 3:09
- Label: Syco
- Songwriter(s): Ashley Fongho; Jamaal Shurland; Myles Stephenson; Mustafa Rahimtulla; David Brown; Britten Newbill; Gary Lee Cooper; William Collins; George Clinton; Loren Hill; Marc Valentine; Eugene Hanes Jr.; Ryan Williamson
- Producer(s): Banx & Ranx; RyKeyz; Cameron Gower Poole (voc.)

Rak-Su singles chronology
"Pyro Ting" (2018)	"I Want You to Freak" (2018)	"Yours or Mine" (2019)

"I Want You to Freak" is a song by British group Rak-Su. It samples Adina Howard's 1995 single "Freak Like Me". The band first performed the song during the live shows on the fifteenth season of The X Factor. The single has since peaked at number 39 on the UK Singles Chart, after debuting at number 58 on the chart dated 5 October 2018, becoming their second top 40 single after "Dimelo".

The single's music video was released on 4 October 2018, via the group's official YouTube account.

== Charts ==
Chart (2018)	Peak position
Ireland (IRMA)	82
Scotland (OCC)	17
UK Singles (OCC)	39

== Certifications ==
Region	Certification	Certified units/sales
United Kingdom (BPI)	Silver	200,000^{‡}
^{‡} Sales+streaming figures based on certification alone.
