= Teddy Beats =

American musician

- Born: Theodore Bloomquist
- Origin: Washington D. C., U.S.
- Genres: EDM; tropical house
- Occupations: DJ, producer
- Years active: 2017-present

Theodore Bloomquist, known professionally as Teddy Beats, is an American DJ and record producer. He is known for his style in the “chill dance” genre of electronic dance music. He has performed at music festivals such as the Firefly Music Festival and Moonrise. He did a remix of “Way 2 Sexy” by Drake featuring Future and Young Thug and also has been a guest DJ on SiriusXM.

== Career ==
After graduating from college, Teddy trained to be a certified audio engineer at Omega Recording Studios. Teddy’s’ first experience with music production was creating hip-hop beats for Bad Boy Entertainment’s Chucky Thompson. After transitioning into electronic dance music, one of his early songs was featured on the radio channel SiriusXM Chill.

Teddy first performed at the Firefly Music Festival in 2019, at the event’s Silent Disco. He also performed at Moonrise in 2019.

Teddy collaborated with Britt Lari on the single “All of Me” in 2020. He also released the singles “Falling” featuring Kenna Woods and Mon Rovîa and “Feels Like Summer.”

Teddy has performed as a supporting act for artists such as Zedd, whom he opened for at Echostage in 2021. He also performed at the Up & Up Festival and returned to the Firefly Music Festival as a performer in 2021. Teddy was one of the artists chosen for Armin van Buuren’s 2021 Armada Chill Christmas Playlist.

Teddy released the singles “Take It Slow” and “Show Me,” both featuring Jolee Nikoal, in 2021. “Show Me” was the 10th musical collaboration between Teddy Beats and Nikoal.

He also released the singles “Everybody Needs Love,” featuring Jacob Browne in May 2021 and “Alive,” featuring Britt Lari in June 2021. Teddy also released a remix of “Way 2 Sexy” by Drake featuring Future and Young Thug and collaborated with singer Ry Hill on a cover of “Heat Waves” by Glass Animals.

In 2022, Teddy released the single “Floating,” featuring Matthew Rapp.

Teddy has been a guest DJ on Sirius XM Chill’s “House of Chill” radio program.

== Discography ==
=== Singles ===
Title	Year	Ref
“Lost Boy” (feat. Sharon Desiree)	2017	
“Ain’t Stoppin” (feat. Jolee Nikoal)	2017	
“Suppose to Be” (feat. Jolee Nikoal)	2017	
“Saturday”	2018	
“I'll Be Around” (feat. Suse B)	2019	
“Waiting for Tonight” (with Camden Levine)(feat. Jolee Nikoal)	2019	
“Hold Me” (feat. Mon Rovîa)	2019	
“All of Me” (feat. Britt Lari)	2020	
“Falling” (feat. Kenna Woods and Mon Rovîa)	2020	
“Feels Like Summer”	2020	
“Take It Slow” (feat. Jolee Nikoal)	2021	
“Show Me” (feat. Jolee Nikoal)	2021	
“Everybody Needs Love” (feat. Jacob Browne)	2021	
“Alive” (feat. Britt Lari)	2021	
“Heat Waves” (cover)(feat. Ry Hill)	2021	
“Floating” (feat. Matthew Rapp)	2022	

=== Remixes ===
Title	Year	Ref
“Way 2 Sexy”	2021	Drake feat. Future and Young Thug
