= Banx & Ranx =

Canadian music production duo

- Official logo

Background information
- Origin: Montreal, Quebec, Canada
- Genres: EDM; dancehall; pop
- Years active: 2014–present
- Labels: Universal Music Canada; 31 East
- Members: KNY Factory; Soké

Banx & Ranx are a music production duo from Montreal, Quebec, Canada, formed in 2014. Members Soké (real name Zacharie Raymond) and KNY Factory (real name Yannick Rastogi) are producers, songwriters and remixers. They are currently signed to Universal Music Canada as partners under their independently owned label 31 East. The duo is best known for their single "Answerphone", which reached number five on the UK Singles Chart on 25 May 2018, as well as their 2022 song "Flowers Need Rain" with Preston Pablo, which became a top 10 hit in Canada.

Banx & Ranx's debut track "Lit" was released in March 2017. It was followed by their second single "Time Bomb" (featuring Lady Leshurr) in May 2017.

Their work with other artists has included two remixes for Gorillaz, production and co-writing on Sean Paul's "Crick Neck" (featured on the soundtrack to the Usain Bolt documentary I Am Bolt), production on Afrobeats musician Fuse ODG's track "Window Seat"; and production and co-writing credits on Nicky Jam's Fénix (nominated for Album of the Year at the Latin Grammy Awards). After their partnership with Universal Music Canada in 2022, they began to produce for the newest generation of Canadian pop talent, including Rêve, Preston Pablo, Zach Zoya, and Sofia Camara. Their pop-EDM track "Headphones" with Rêve peaked at number 49 in Canada, while their mellow house/EDM track "Flowers Need Rain" with Preston Pablo was a Canadian top-10 hit, peaking at number 9. Both songs charted on the Canadian Hot 100 year-end chart for 2022, at numbers 97 and 32, respectively.

They received a Grammy Award nomination for Sean Paul's album Scorcha and three Juno Award nominations at the Juno Awards of 2023, for Breakthrough Group of the Year, Single of the Year for "Flowers Need Rain", and Jack Richardson Producer of the Year for Rêve's "Ctrl + Alt + Del" and Sean Paul's "Dynamite". They won the award for Breakthrough Group.

== Discography ==
=== Extended plays ===
List of extended plays
Title	Details
The Vault, Volume 1	Released: April 12, 2024; Labels: 31 East, Universal Music Canada; Format: Digital download, streaming

=== Singles ===
Single	Year	Peak chart positions		Certifications	Album
Single	Year	CAN	UK	Certifications	Album
"Empire"	2014	—	—		Non-album singles
"Lit"	2017	—	—		Non-album singles
"Time Bomb" (featuring Lady Leshurr)	2017	—	—		Non-album singles
"Answerphone" (with Ella Eyre featuring Yxng Bane)	2018	—	5	BPI: Platinum	Non-album singles
"Pyro Ting" (with Rak-Su)	2018	—	—		Non-album singles
"Hold Me Down" (with Henry Fong featuring Sophia Ayana and Richie Loop)	2018	—	—		Non-album singles
"Ego" (featuring Sean Paul)	2018	—	—		Non-album singles
"Drunk and I Miss You" (Remix) (with Kiddo featuring Decco)	2018	—	—		Non-album singles
"Speaker" (featuring Olivia Holt and ZieZie)	2019	—	—		Non-album singles
"Mama" (with Ella Eyre featuring Kiana Ledé)	2019	—	—		Non-album singles
"The Reason Why" (with JP Cooper and Stefflon Don)	2019	—	—		Non-album singles
"Traffic Jam" (with Kojo Funds)	2019	—	—		Non-album singles
"Headphones" (with Rêve or with Rêve and Tommy Genesis)	2022	49	—	MC: Platinum	Non-album singles
"Flowers Need Rain" (with Preston Pablo)	2022	9	—	MC: 4× Platinum	Dance Alone
"Fire" (with JP Cooper)	2022	—	—		Non-album singles
"Balenciaga" (with Demarco and Konshens)	2022	—	—		Non-album singles
"The Birds" (featuring Zach Zoya)	2023	—	—		Non-album singles
"After Party (Just Dance)" (featuring Zach Zoya)	2023	—	—		Non-album singles
"James Bond" (with Jujuboy)	2023	—	—		Non-album singles
"Dirty Dance" (with Stylo G)	2023	—	—		Non-album singles
"Distance"	2024	—	—		Non-album singles
"Proppa Ghanda" (with King Cruff)	2024	—	—		Summa Soulstice
"Waiting" (with Shirazee)	2024	—	—		Non-album single
"Easy!" (with King Cruff)	2024	—	—		What Have I 'Don
"¿Qué Lo Que?" (with Altur Santos)	2024	—	—		Non-album singles
"I'm a Mess" (with Sam James)	2025	—	—		Non-album singles
"—" denotes a recording that did not chart or was not released in that territory.

=== Songwriting and production credits ===
Track	Year	Artist(s)	Album	Credits	Written with:	Produced with:
"Think Positive"	2015	Sizzla	Non-album single	Producer	—	None
"Kiss Me"	2015	Olly Murs	Never Been Better	Co-writer/Producer	Oliver Murs, Steve Robson, Gary Derussy, Lindy Robbins, Jacob Taio Cruz	Steve Robson
"Crick Neck"	2016	Sean Paul, Chi Ching Ching	Non-album singles	Co-writer/Producer	Sean Henriques, Jordan McClure, David Hayle, Radion Beckford	Jordan McClure, David Hayle
"Sex 4 Breakfast"	2017	KStewart	Non-album singles	Co-writer/Producer	Katherine Stewart, David Stewart, Adam Baptiste, Ayak Thiik	None
"Duele"	2017	Alx Veliz	Non-album singles	Co-writer/Producer	Max Bernard, Hubert Tremblay	None
"Uh La La"	2017	Xantos	Non-album singles	Co-writer/Producer	TBC	None
"Window Seat"	2017	Fuse ODG	Non-album singles	Co-writer/Producer	Richard Abiona, Philip Meckseper	Jr. Blender
"I Can't Forget You"	2017	Nicky Jam	Fénix	Co-writer/Producer	TBC	None
"No Te Puedo Olvidar"	2017	Nicky Jam	Fénix	Co-writer/Producer	TBC	None
"Slow Motion"	2017	Kevin Lyttle	Non-album single	Producer	—	None
"OMW"	2018	Lady Leshurr	TBA	Producer	—	None
"Mad Love"	2018	Sean Paul, David Guetta, Becky G	Mad Love the Prequel	Producer	—	David Guetta, Giorgio Tuinfort, Jack Patterson, Jason Henriques, 1st Klase
"Black Madonna"	2018	Lady Leshurr, Mr Eazi	TBA	Co-writer/Producer	Melesha O'Garro, Oluwatosin Ajibade	None
"Kiss and Make Up"	2018	Dua Lipa, Blackpink	Dua Lipa: The; Complete Edition	Co-writer/Producer	Dua Lipa, Mathieu Jomphe-Lepine, Chelcee Grimes, Marc Vincent	None
"Naked Truth"	2018	Sean Paul, Jhené Aiko	Mad Love the Prequel	Co-writer/Producer	Obi Ebele, Uche Ebele, Sean Henriques, Malcolm Olangundoye, Taylor Parks, Priscilla Renea	Da Beat Freakz
"Bad Love"	2018	Sean Paul, Ellie Goulding	Mad Love the Prequel	Co-writer/Producer	Obi Ebele, Uche Ebele, Sean Henriques, Malcolm Olangundoye, Asia Whiteacre, Carla Williams	Da Beat Freakz
"Jump On It"	2018	Sean Paul	Mad Love the Prequel	Producer	—	Julian Bunetta, Teddy Geiger
"Cause Trouble"	2018	Chi Ching Ching	Turning Tables	Producer	—	None
"I Want You to Freak"	2018	Rak-Su	TBA	Producer	—	Rykeyz
"Purpose"	2018	Jonas Blue, Era Istrefi	Blue	Co-writer/Producer	Grace Barker, Era Istrefi, Guy James Robin, Alex Smith	Jonas Blue
"Shot & Wine"	2019	Sean Paul, Stefflon Don	Non-album single	Co-writer/Producer	Stephanie Allen, Nija Charles, Sean Henriques, Shakka Phillip	ADP, Shakka
"Thunder"	2019	Rak-Su	Rome – EP	Co-writer/Producer	Ashley Fongho, Alastair O'Donnell, Edwin Serrano, Jamaal Shurland, Myles Stephenson	None
"Airplane Mode"	2019	Nadia Rose	Non-album single	Co-writer/Producer	Nadia Rose, Marlon Roudette	Marlon Roudette
"Mama"	2019	Ella Eyre, Kiana Ledé	Non-album single	Co-writer/Producer	Kiana Ledé, Ella McMahon, Dayo Olatunji, Shakka Phillips	None
"Too Bad Bad"	2019	Shakka, Mr Eazi	Non-album single	Co-writer/Producer	Oluwatosin Ajibade, Shakka Phillip	None
"Condo"	2019	Afro B, T-Pain	Afrowave 3	Co-writer/Producer^{1}	Afro B, Glen Patnelli, Gabriel Wood, T-Pain	Team Salut
"On m'a dit"	2020	Benny Adam	La Barquetterie SS2	Producer	Benny Adam	Benny Adam
"Calling On Me"	2020	Sean Paul, Tove Lo	Scorcha	Co-writer/Producer	Nija Charles, Sean Paul Henriques, Shakka Phillip	None
"L.O.V.(e)."	2020	Ella Eyre	Quarter Life Crisis	Co-writer/Producer	Ella McMahon, Francicsa Hall, Jesse Shatkin	Jesse Shatkin
"Dreams"	2020	Ella Eyre, Yxng Bane	Quarter Life Crisis	Co-writer/Producer	Daya Olatunji, Ella McMahon, Nat Dunn	None
"Sans Lendemain (One Last Time)"	2020	Imposs, Marie-Mai	ÉlévaZIIION (Société distincte)	Co-writer/Producer	Marie-Mai Bouchard, Stanley Salgado	Joy Ride Records
"Whoppa"	2020	Tinie Tempah, Sofia Reyes, Farina	TBA	Producer	Farina Pao Paucar Franco, Nils Rondhuis, Patrick Okogwu, Shari Lynn Short, Sofia Reyes, Thom van der Bruggen	Yellow Claw
"Careless"	2020	Ella Eyre	Quarter Life Crisis	Co-writer/Producer	Daya Olatunji, Ella McMahon, Nat Dunn	None
"Tell Me About It"	2020	Ella Eyre	Quarter Life Crisis	Producer	Ella Eyre, Chiara Hunter, Dan Goudie, Ash Milton	Laconic
"Still Dancing"	2021	Rêve	Layover	Producer	Briannah Donolo, Sara Diamond	None
"Only Fanz"	2021	Sean Paul, Ty Dolla $ign	Scorcha	Producer	Ashante Reid, Shakka Phillip, Ty Dolla $ign, Sean Paul	Jason Henriques, Sean Paul
"CTRL + ALT + DEL"	2021	Rêve	Layover and Saturn Return	Producer, Studio Mixing	Rêve	None
"Lie To Me"	2021	Alessia Cara	In the Meantime	Producer, Recording Engineer, Studio Personnel	Don Mills, Clément Langlois-Lé, YogiTheProducer, Boi-1da, Alessia Cara	Boi-1da, Don Mills, YogiTheProducer
"SKIN 2 SKIN"	2021	Rêve	Layover	Producer	Briannah Donolo, Daniel Seraphine, David James Wolinski, Sarah Diamond	None
"Dura"	2021	Las Villa, Junafran	TBA	Producer	Lucía Villa, Laura Villa, Juanfran, Cris Chil	None
"Business"	2021	Becky Hill, Ella Eyre	Only Honest on the Weekend	Producer	MNEK, Ella Eyre, Becky Hill	MNEK
"Henkel Glue"	2022	Shenseea, Beenie Man	ALPHA	Producer	Jordan McClure, Shenseea, David Hayle, Beenie Man	Chimney Records
"How We Do It"	2022	Sean Paul, Pia Mia	Scorcha	Producer	Clarence Coffee Jr., Janne Benn, RAYE, Nyann Lodge, Sean Paul	None
"Earthquake"	2022	Sean Paul	Scorcha	Producer	Sean Paul	Jason Henriques
"Upper Hand"	2022	Zach Zoya, Soran	No Love Is Ever Wasted	Producer	Marc Vincent, Soran Dussaigne, Zacharie Morier-Gxoyiya	Marc Vincent
"Understand"	2022	Zach Zoya	No Love Is Ever Wasted	Producer	Hubert Tremblay, Tremaine Dayton Robinson, Zacharie Morier	None
"Gone"	2022	Twice	Between 1&2	Producer	Ella Eyre, Natalie Dunn, Shakka Philip	None
"Never Be Yours"	2022	Sofia Camara	TBA	Producer	Jay Isaiah, Sofia Camara	None
"Whitney"	2022	Rêve	Saturn Return	Producer	Briannah Donolo, Joel Stouffer, Nickolas Ashford, Valerie Simpson	Joel Stouffer
"Love You Bad"	2022	Preston Pablo	Dance Alone	Producer	Preston Pablo, Soran Dussaigne	None
"Hypersexual"	2022	Rêve	Saturn Return	Producer	Briannah Donolo, Peter Hanna	None
"Évidemment"	2023	La Zarra	TBA	Producer, songwriter	La Zarra	Benny Adam
"Eyes Roll"	2023	(G)I-dle	Heat	Producer, songwriter	J. Lauryn, Meghan Trainor, Ryan Trainor, Youngbin "Chasu" Park	Chasu
"Ice Cream"	2024	Jeon Somi	TBA	Producer	Ella Eyre, Teddy Park, Ed Drewett	None

Notes

1. ^^{a} Soké & KNY Factory received individual writing credits for this song.

=== Remixes ===
Track	Year	Artist(s)
Dem Doom (Banx & Ranx Remix)	2015	Capleton
Infiltrate (Banx & Ranx Remix)	2015	Sean Paul
Let Me Out (Banx & Ranx Remix) (with Pusha T)	2017	Gorillaz
Dirty Sexy Money (Banx & Ranx Remix)	2017	David Guetta
Saturnz Barz	2017	Gorillaz
How Does It Feel (Banx & Ranx Remix)	2018	Samm Henshaw
Oceans (Banx & Ranx Remix) (featuring Khalid)	2018	Martin Garrix
One Shot (Banx & Ranx Remix)	2018	Mabel
German (Banx & Ranx Remix)	2018	EO
Let Me Live (Banx & Ranx Remix) (feat. Anne-Marie and Mr. Eazi)	2018	Rudimental
I'll Be There (Banx & Ranx Remix)	2018	Jess Glynne
Genius (Banx & Ranx Remix) (featuring Sia, Diplo and Labrinth)	2018	LSD
Genius (Banx & Ranx Reggae Remix)	2018	LSD
Lifted (Banx & Ranx Remix)		Allie X
Sleep (Banx & Ranx Remix)	2019	Johnny Orlando
