= Scorcha =

Studio album by Sean Paul
- Released: 27 May 2022
- Recorded: 2019–2022
- Studios: Dutty Rock (Kingston); Paramount (Los Angeles); East Studio (Montreal); No Expectations (Los Angeles); Westlake (Los Angeles); Mound Sound (Los Angeles); Don Corleon (Kingston); Fénix (Miami); The Hit Factory (New York City)
- Genres: Dancehall; reggae
- Length: 48:50
- Labels: Dutty Rock; Island
- Producers: Sean Paul; Banx & Ranx; Jigzagula; Jordon Manswell; Di Genius; Supa Dups; Zay Bans; Tainy; TJ Records; Sevn Thomas; Creative Titans; IzyBeats; Bassto; SOUNDSfromIKEY; Alexander “A.C.” Castillo; Kool Kojak; SAK PASE; Sermstyle; Okan; Dutty Rock Productions

Sean Paul chronology
Live n Livin (2021)	Scorcha (2022)

Singles from Scorcha
- 1. "Calling On Me" Released: 7 February 2020; 2. "Scorcha" Released: 11 December 2020; 3. "Only Fanz" Released: 12 August 2021; 4. "Dynamite" Released: 22 October 2021; 5. "How We Do It" Released: 10 March 2022; 6. "No Fear" Released: 20 April 2022; 7. "Light My Fire" Released: 25 May 2022

Professional ratings
Review scores
Source	Rating
NME	4/5 stars

Scorcha is the eighth studio album by Jamaican dancehall musician Sean Paul, released on 27 May 2022 through Dutty Rock Productions and Island Records. It features collaborations with Sia, Gwen Stefani, Shenseea, Stylo G, Damian Marley, Nicky Jam, Tove Lo, Jada Kingdom, Pia Mia and Ty Dolla Sign.

Scorcha debuted at number 6 on the US Billboard Reggae Albums with 1,700 album equivalent units. The album would also receive a Grammy nomination for Best Reggae Album at the 65th Annual Grammy Awards.

== Critical reception ==
Kyann-Sian Williams of NME gave the album a positive review with a 4-star rating, calling it "pop-accented bops from the Godfather of Dancehall", also praising the sound of the album by stating "he proves his hitmaking skills and why he still is the pioneer of island pop."

== Track listing ==
Scorcha track listing
No.	Title	Writer(s)	Producer(s)	Length
1.	"As We Enter"	Shaun "Coppershaun" Anderson, Jason Henriques, Sean Paul Henriques, Nyann Lodge	Jigzagula, Dutty Rock Productions	0:15
2.	"Wine Up"	Di Genius, Sean Paul Henriques, Jordon Manswell, Dwayne Chin-Quee	Jigzagula, Jordon Manswell, Di Genius, Supa Dups	2:59
3.	"Scorcha" (Hot Peppa Mix)	David Hayle, Jordan McClure, Sean Paul Henriques	Banx & Ranx, Jason Henriques	2:16
4.	"Only Fanz" (featuring Ty Dolla Sign)	Ashante Reid, Shakka Philip, Yannick Rastogi, Soké Theman, Tyrone William Griffin Jr., Sean Paul Henriques	Jigzagula, Sean Paul, Banx & Ranx	2:54
5.	"Earthquake"	Soke, Yannick Rastogi, Sean Paul Henriques	Banx & Ranx, Jigzagula	2:47
6.	"How We Do It" (featuring Pia Mia)	Clarence Coffee Jr., Janne Benn, Rachel Keen, Nyann Lodge, Soké Theman, Sean Paul Henriques	Banx & Ranx	3:01
7.	"Bouncing" (featuring Jada Kingdom)	Verse Simmonds, Zay Bans, Shama E. Joseph, Kheil Harrison, Ikey Copeland, Jada Kingdom, Sean Paul Henriques	Jigzagula, Zay Bans, SoundsFromIkey, Stone, Sak Pase	3:00
8.	"Dynamite" (featuring Sia)	Nyann Lodge, Soké Theman, Yannick Rastogi, Greg Kurstin, Sia Furler, Sean Paul Henriques	Jigzagula, Greg Kurstin, Banx & Ranx	3:32
9.	"Light My Fire" (featuring Gwen Stefani and Shenseea)	Gamal Lewis, Rosina Russell, Allan Grigg, Gwen Stefani, Chinsea Lee, Sean Paul Henriques	Alexander "A.C." Castillo, Kool Kojak	3:24
10.	"Calling On Me" (with Tove Lo)	Sean Paul Henriques, Yannick Rastogi, Soké Theman, Nija Charles, Shakka Philip	Banx & Ranx	3:38
11.	"Good Day"	Tim Gomringer, Kevin Gomringer, Sevn Thomas, Nyann Lodge, Dwayne Richard Chin-Quee, Sean Paul Henriques	Jigzagula, Supa Dups, Sevn Thomas, CuBeatz	4:05
12.	"Borrowed Time"	Sean Paul Henriques, Chloe Angelides, Glenda Proby, Jamie Sanderson, Orkhan Orujov	Sermstyle, Okan, Dutty Rock Productions, Jigzagula	3:25
13.	"Pon Di Reel" (featuring Stylo G)	Sean Paul Henriques, Shaun "Coppershaun" Anderson, Nyann Lodge, Jason Henriques	Jigzagula	3:23
14.	"Back It Up Deh" (Remix)	Sean Paul Henriques, Shaun "Coppershaun" Anderson, Nyann Lodge, Jason Henriques	Jigzagula	3:27
15.	"Bend You Back" (6:30 Mix)	Sean Paul Henriques, Mark Collinder, Linton "TJ" White	Jigzagula, TJ Records	3:13
16.	"No Fear" (featuring Damian Marley and Nicky Jam)	Sean Paul Henriques, Damian Marley, Nick Rivera	Jigzagula, Tainy, Supa Dups	3:31
Total length:				48:50

== Charts ==
Chart performance for Scorcha
Chart (2022)	Peak position
Scottish Albums (Official Charts)	80
US Reggae Albums (Billboard)	6
