= Richie Loop =

Jamaican musical artist

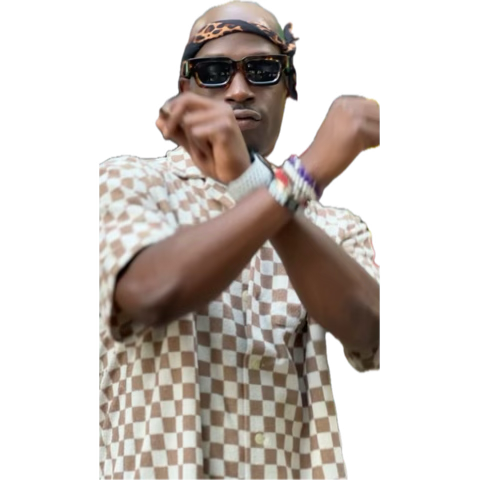
- Richie Loop

Background information
- Born: Richard Webb; Kingston, Jamaica
- Genres: Reggae; Dancehall; Soca; Techno

Richie Loop (a.k.a. Richard Webb) is a Jamaican singer, MC and music producer. Born in Kingston and raised in Clarendon Parish, he worked with Derrick Morgan in his early career, before going on to collaborate with a wide variety of artists across a range of genres of electronic dance music from the 2000s onwards. His productions and collaborations typically combine Caribbean and European dance music styles, including reggae, dancehall, soca, techno, bass house, psy-trance and drum 'n' bass. Past collaborators include Hardwell, Banx & Ranx, Bad Royale, Shaggy, Henry Fong, Mr.Black and Bassjackers.

Richie Loop's breakthrough hit was "My Cup" released in 2010, which led to a collaboration with Busy Signal. His album Manimal was released in 2018 on Flex Up Records. In 2024, he released the 8-track Spacehall Vol.1 EP, a collaboration with JP Backhouse.
