= Light My Fire (Sean Paul song) =

2022 single by Sean Paul featuring Gwen Stefani and Shenseea

Single by Sean Paul featuring Gwen Stefani and Shenseea

from the album Scorcha
- Released: 25 May 2022
- Studio: Westlake (Los Angeles); Mound Sound (Los Angeles)
- Genre: Reggae
- Length: 3:22
- Label: Island
- Songwriters: Sean Paul; Chinsea Lee; Saul Alexander Castillo Vasquez; Gamal Kosh Lewis; Allan Peter Grigg; Rosina Russell; Emily Warren
- Producers: Kool Kojak; Alexander "AC" Castillo; Jason Jigzag Henriques

Sean Paul singles chronology
"No Fear" (2022)	"Light My Fire" (2022)	"Tic Tac" (2022)

Gwen Stefani singles chronology
"Slow Clap" (2021)	"Light My Fire" (2022)	"True Babe" (2023)

Shenseea singles chronology
"Deserve It" (2022)	"Light My Fire" (2022)	"Rain" (2022)

Music video
- "Light My Fire" on YouTube

"Light My Fire" is a song recorded by Jamaican singer Sean Paul featuring guest vocals from American singer Gwen Stefani and Jamaican dancehall artist Shenseea. He wrote "Light My Fire" with Shenseea, Saul Alexander "AC" Castillo Vasquez, Gamal Kosh Lewis, Allan Peter Grigg, Rosina Russell, and Emily Warren. It was produced by Grigg, AC, and Paul's brother Jason Jigzag Henriques. In interviews, Paul revealed the collaboration was a result of his admiration of both Stefani and Shenseea. It was digitally released as a single by Island Records on 25 May 2022 in support of Paul's eighth studio album, Scorcha (2022).

"Light My Fire" is a reggae-heavy track that incorporates the individual musical styles of all three artists. Critically, it was regarded as a highlight collaboration on Scorcha. Several reviewers also noted the trio's chemistry on the track. The accompanying music video to "Light My Fire" was released on 13 July 2022, and directed by Quinn Wilson. It features the three artists hosting a house party featuring dancing, singing, and cooking. Stefani's Jamaican-inspired outfit proved controversial, with some critics accusing her of cultural appropriation. Paul and Savannah Baker, the video's stylist, came to Stefani's defense.

== Background and release ==
In January 2021, Sean Paul announced that he would be releasing two separate studio albums that year, entitled Live N Livin and Scorcher. While the former album was released in 2021, the release of Scorcha, which became retitled, was delayed until 2022. Ahead of announcing its release date, Paul unveiled the dates to his supporting Scorcha Tour in early March 2022. The first news of Paul collaborating with American singer Gwen Stefani and Jamaican dancehall artist Shenseea came later that month, along with the official release date for Scorcha. According to Paul, he had long admired Stefani's career and working on "Light My Fire" collaboratively was a "dream come true" for him. She had incorporated reggae and dancehall music into her earlier career, and worked with artists such as Marion Hall and Damian Marley.

"Light My Fire" was written by Paul, Shenseea, Saul Alexander "AC" Castillo Vasquez, Gamal Kosh Lewis, Allan Peter Grigg, Rosina Russell, and Emily Warren, and it was produced by AC, Grigg, and Paul's brother, Jason Jigzag Henriques. "Light My Fire" was released for digital download and streaming through Island Records on 25 May 2022, two days prior to the release of its parent album. Before the release of its accompanying music video, a tropical-inspired lyric video for "Light My Fire" was released onto Paul's YouTube account on 22 June 2022.

== Composition and lyrics ==
[Shenseea] is, to me, one of the most exciting things in dancehall right now [and Gwen Stefani] has been awesome. She's a dope artist and she loves reggae from long time. She loves the vibes, she wears the colors, has the arm bands. I'm like 'Yo, she's down with the movement'. She represents the country.

— Sean Paul commenting on his decision to work with both Gwen Stefani and Shenseea on "Light My Fire".

"Light My Fire" is a reggae track.

According to its sheet music, "Light My Fire" is set in the time signature of common time, and has a slower tempo of 90 beats per minute. The song is composed in the key of E♭ and begins with a short intro from Paul, followed by Stefani performing the chorus; each refrain is followed by alternating verses by Paul and then Shenseea. Marc Griffin from Vibe found Paul to be performing with his "signature sing-songy delivery", specifically on the lines "A mi seh, baby mi seh, don't you worry, don't worry your brain / Don't you fret, just listen, I'm sayin' / Serious, mi serious, sun look inna mi face" and "I'm tryna take you back to my place / Slow whine, baby, just stick to my pace / Rock steady, girl, to di rhythm and bass".

== Critical reception ==
Nicholas Nam from Dancehall Magazine called "Light My Fire" a "charming clam" amidst the album's other songs, and felt that the "contrasting styles of the three singers [actually] blend together seamlessly". Bryson Paul, writing for The Source, said that with Paul's use of "the unexpected vocals" from both Stefani and Shenseea, "Light My Fire" served as "a testament to Paul’s supreme ability to produce global hits". Regarding Stefani's addition, Ali Shutler from The Daily Telegraph felt she brought "grit and ambition" to the song; Shutler also wrote that the "fire" songs on Scorcha are the ones where Paul brings on global artists. However, NME's Kyann-Sian Williams thought Stefani's vocal performance on "Light My Fire" was inferior to her older "reggae-fusion" songs, such as No Doubt's "Underneath It All" (2001).

== Music video ==
In the music video for "Light My Fire", Stefani wears fishtail braids, which some critics mistook for dreadlocks.

The official video for "Light My Fire" premiered digitally on Wednesday, 13 July 2022. The video itself was directed by Quinn Wilson, according to its press release, and depicts a group of partygoers and utilizes an orange hue filter. Paul described the synopsis: "[We're] basically getting ready to party and some lovers rocking. It's a vibe we hope everyone gets [...] feel good and party lovers-rock style". It opens with a shot of Stefani through a fish tank, with a group of women dancing and cooking around her. Paul appears in a bathroom performing the first verse, flirting with a woman in a bathtub. Shenseea appears last, on the dance floor, where Stefani and Paul later meet up with her to join in. Dancehall Magazine's Brianna Vernon wrote that Stefani and Shenseea serve as the party's "rocksteady boss" and "dancehall diva", respectively. Stefani is adorned in a "Jamaican-inspired outfit", according to Rolling Stone's Tomás Mier, who felt it complimented the Caribbean vibe from Shenseea.

Alongside the YouTube release of the music video, it was made available for download via Apple Music on 13 July 2022. Some Twitter users commented negatively about Stefani's dreadlocks hairstyle and Jamaican flag-inspired outfit, and accused her of exhibiting cultural appropriation. Some fans defended Stefani's appearance, and Paul commented: "From her No Doubt days, she was coming [to Jamaica] to record. So, it impressed me that she wants to come to Jamaica. A lot of people do Reggae, a lot of people do Dancehall-oriented tracks, but they never come. She comes to Jamaica." Savannah Baker, a Jamaican stylist and the designer for the "Light My Fire" music video, also responded to the criticism:

I spoke with various Jamaicans before 'can she have some Jamaican colors in?' and we all said 'Jamaica loves her and she always represented it from the get go.' [...] And I think cultural appropriation is good to be aware of but also goes too far and people get obsessed with it and make a deal out of everything but it's not locs. It's fishtail braids. Her hairstylist has worked with her for many years. We discussed it; she felt comfortable doing it. And [her hairstylist] is Jamaican. It's not like she is a white hairstylist doing it.

== Track listing ==
Digital download/streaming
No.	Title	Length
1.	"Light My Fire" (featuring Gwen Stefani and Shenseea)	3:22

== Release history ==
Release dates and formats for "Light My Fire"
Region	Date	Format(s)	Label	Ref.
Various	25 May 2022	Digital download; streaming	Island	
