= Dynamite (Sean Paul song) =

Single by Sean Paul featuring Sia

from the album Scorcha
- Released: 22 October 2021
- Recorded: 2019—2021
- Studio: Dutty Rock (Kingston); East Studio (Montreal); No Expectations (Los Angeles)
- Genre: Dancehall; pop
- Length: 3:32
- Label: Island
- Songwriters: Sean Paul Henriques; Sia Furler; Greg Kurstin; Nyann "News" Lodge; Yannick Rastogi; Zacharie Raymond
- Producers: Banx & Ranx; Greg Kurstin; Jason Jigzagula Henriques

Sean Paul singles chronology
"Only Fanz" (2021)	"Dynamite" (2021)	"Up" (2021)

Sia singles chronology
"Floating Through Space" (2021)	"Dynamite" (2021)	"Unstoppable" (2022)

Music video
- "Dynamite" on YouTube

"Dynamite" is a song by Jamaican rapper and singer Sean Paul featuring Australian singer-songwriter Sia. It was released by Island Records as the fourth single from Paul's eighth studio album Scorcha on 22 October 2021.

== Background and release ==
"Dynamite" marks the second collaboration between Sean Paul and Sia. In 2016, Sia released a version of her single "Cheap Thrills" featuring Paul. It later reached number one on the Billboard Hot 100 and spent four weeks there. After this, Paul says he and Sia knew they would record another single to act as its follow-up. When Paul sent Sia a working version of "Dynamite", she told him that "he had another hit on his hands".

Sean Paul announced the release of "Dynamite" via his social media accounts on 16 October 2021 and it was released shortly after on 22 October.

== Composition ==
"Dynamite" is an upbeat pop and dancehall song. The Independent described it as a "feel-good dancefloor-filler". It was produced by Canadian duo Banx & Ranx, Greg Kurstin, and Jason Jigzagula Henriques. Banx & Ranx and Kurstin were involved in songwriting too, alongside Paul, Sia, and Nyann "News" Lodge.

== Track listing ==
Digital download and streaming

1. "Dynamite" (featuring Sia) – 3:32

Digital download and streaming – remixes

1. "Dynamite" (featuring Sia and Miss Lafamilia) [Banx & Ranx Remix] – 2:21
2. "Dynamite" (featuring Sia) [Nelsaan Remix] – 3:22
3. "Dynamite" (featuring Sia) – 3:32

== Personnel ==
Credits adapted from Tidal.

- Sean Paul – songwriting, vocals
- Sia – songwriting, vocals
- Greg Kurstin – songwriting, production, programming, additional production, additional engineering, vocal engineering
- Jason Jigzagula Henriques – production, executive production
- Banx & Ranx – production
  - Yannick Rastogi – songwriting, drums, bass guitar, keyboards, programming
  - Zacharie Raymond – songwriting, drums, bass guitar, keyboards, programming
- Nyann "News" Lodge – songwriting, recording engineering
- Julian Burg – additional engineering
- Josh Gudwin – mixing
- Heidi Wang – mixing assistant
- Chris Athens – mastering

== Charts ==
Chart performance for "Dynamite"
Chart (2021)	Peak position
Belgium (Ultratop 50 Flanders)	50
Belgium (Ultratop 50 Wallonia)	25
France (SNEP)	108
New Zealand Hot Singles (RMNZ)	31
Norway (VG-lista)	39
Suriname (Nationale Top 40)	2
Switzerland (Schweizer Hitparade)	92

== Certifications ==
Region	Certification	Certified units/sales
France (SNEP)	Gold	100,000^{‡}
^{‡} Sales+streaming figures based on certification alone.

== Release history ==
Release history and formats for "Dynamite"
Region	Date	Format	Version	Label	Ref.
Various	22 October 2021	Digital download; streaming	Original	Island	
Italy	29 October 2021	Contemporary hit radio	Original	Universal	
Various	14 January 2022	Digital download; streaming	Remixes	Island	
