= Bad Royale =

US musical group

- Origin: California, U.S.
- Genres: Dancehall
- Occupations: DJs; producers
- Years active: 2015–2020
- Labels: Rude Mood; Mad Decent; Polydor; Atlantic; Buygore
- Members: Maor Levi; Bruce Karlsson; Kevin Wild; Elias Ghosn
- Past members: Maor Levi
- Website: badroyale.com

Bad Royale is an American DJ/production group consisting of Maor Levi, Bruce Karlsson, Kevin Wild and Elias Ghosn. Karlsson was also a member of the electronic duo Norin & Rad.

== Career ==
Bad Royale was formed on the summit of a mountain in Southern California. They noted that Major Lazer inspired them to start the project.

Known for collaborating with Diplo, Steve Aoki and Skrillex, Bad Royale have performed at notable dance music festivals such as Ultra, Electric Zoo, Tomorrowland and Life In Color. They started a record label named Rude Mood. In 2015, Bad Royale and Diplo remixed "Look At My Dab", a song by hip-hop group Migos.

On May 6, 2016, Bad Royale's EP Immutable Timeline, which features the single "Bun It Up", was released. In December 2016, they collaborated with Major Lazer to release the single "My Number". Their remix of VICE's song "Steady 1234" which features singer Jasmine Thompson and rapper Skizzy Mars, released via Atlantic Records.

On January 20, 2017, Anjunabeats partnered with Mad Decent to release three of Bad Royale's covers of Above & Beyond's songs such as "We're All We Need" and "Fly Me to New York", as singles. In May 2017, they signed with Polydor Records.

On May 5, 2017, their single "All I Can Do", a collaboration with Silver which was written by Jamie Hartman, was released via Polydor Records. Former member of the group Maor Levi left to pursue his own solo endeavors in 2017, leaving the group as a trio.

== Discography ==
=== Extended plays ===
Title	Details
Move Like	Released: July 7, 2015; Label: Mad Decent; Format: Digital download, CD
Welcome to the Badlands	Released: July 14, 2015; Label: Buygore; Format: Digital download, CD
Before Common Era	Released: December 1, 2015; Label: Buygore; Format: Digital download, CD
Immutable Timeline	Released: May 6, 2016; Label: Mad Decent; Format: Digital download, CD
Treasures From Tomorrow	Released: October 12, 2016; Label: Mad Decent; Format: Digital download, CD
We're All We Need	Released: January 20, 2017; Label: Mad Decent; Format: Digital download, CD

=== Singles ===
==== As lead artist ====
Title	Year	Album
"Hey!" (featuring Fly Boi Keno)	2015	Non-album single
"Galaxy Ranger" (featuring Mark Hardy)	2016	Treasures from Tomorrow
"Vibrate" (featuring Brukout)	2016	Treasures from Tomorrow
"Gyal Ya Shake It" (featuring Future Fambo)	2016	Treasures from Tomorrow
"No Behavior" (featuring Hashim)	2016	Non-album single
"We're All We Need"	2017	We're All We Need
"Blue Sky Action" (featuring Ruby Chase)	2017	We're All We Need
"Fly to New York" (featuring Flipo)	2017	We're All We Need
"All I Can Do" (featuring Silver)	2017	Non-album singles
"Generals" (with Party Favor featuring Richie Loop)	2019	Non-album singles
"NRG" (featuring Richie Loop and Lulu)	2019	Non-album singles

==== Promotional singles ====
Title	Year
"My Number" (with Major Lazer)	2016

==== As featured artist ====
Title	Year
"Big Booty" (Richieloop featuring Bad Royale)	2015

=== Remixes ===
- Bryce Vine - “Drew Barrymore” (Bad Royale Remix)
- Major Lazer featuring Elephant Man and Opal – "Wind Up" (Bad Royale Bootleg)
- Major Lazer featuring Ms. Thing – "When You Hear The Bassline" (Bad Royale Remix)
- Silento – "Watch Me" (Bad Royale Remix)
- Wale – "The Girls On Drugs" (Bad Royale Remix)
- Snails featuring Big Ali – "King is Back" (Bad Royale Remix)
- Galantis – "Gold Dust" (Bad Royale Remix)
- Alison Wonderland – "Run" (Bad Royale Remix)
- TWRK – "Helicopter" (Bad Royale Remix)
- Future Fambo – "Bloodclaute Song" (Bad Royale Remix)
- Steve Aoki, NERVO and Tony Junior – "Lightning Strikes" (Bad Royale Remix)
- WE CHIEF – "Fresh Lemonade" (Bad Royale Remix)
- Migos – "Look At My Dab" (Diplo and Bad Royale Remix)
- Shaggy featuring Pitbull and Gene Noble – "Only Love" (Bad Royale Remix)
- Major Lazer featuring Ellie Goulding and Tarrus Riley – "Powerful" (Bad Royale Remix)
- Hailee Steinfeld – "Love Myself" (Bad Royale Remix)
- Travis Scott – "Antidote" (Bad Royale Remix)
- DJ Mustard featuring Travis Scott – "Whole Lotta Lovin'" (Bad Royale Remix)
- Rihanna featuring Drake – "Work" (Bad Royale Remix)
- The Chainsmokers – "Inside Out" (Bad Royale Remix)
- Lizzo – "Good As Hell" (Bad Royale Remix)
- Steve Aoki and BOEHM featuring WALK THE MOON – "Back 2 U" (Steve Aoki and Bad Royale Remix)
- Gente de Zona – "Algo Contigo" (Bad Royale Remix)
- VICE – "Steady 1234" (Bad Royale Remix)
- DJ Snake featuring Yellow Claw – "Ocho Cinco" (Bad Royale Remix)
- Marvay – "Know The Face" (Bad Royale Dubplate Remix)
- Steve Aoki and Louis Tomlinson – "Just Hold On" (Bad Royale Remix)
- Ultimate Rejects – "Full Extreme" (Walshy Fire, Bad Royale and DJ Puffy Remix)
- Balkan Beat Box – "Chin Chin" (Bad Royale Remix)
- Matoma and MAGIC! featuring D.R.A.M. – "Girl At Coachella" (Bad Royale Remix)
- A R I Z O N A – "Electric Touch" (Bad Royale Remix)
- Black Shadow featuring Rupee – "Tipsy" (Bad Royale Remix)
- Skip Marley – "Calm Down" (Bad Royale Remix)
- Skrillex and Team EZY featuring NJOMZA – "Pretty Bye Bye" (Bad Royale Remix)
- Britney Spears featuring Tinashe - "Slumber Party" (Bad Royale Remix)
