= Something Better (Audien song) =

Single by Audien featuring Lady Antebellum

from the EP Daydreams
- Released: July 10, 2015
- Genre: Progressive house; dance-pop
- Length: 3:32
- Label: Astralwerks; Capitol
- Songwriter(s): Nathaniel Rathbun; Peter Hanna; Taylor Bird
- Producer(s): Audien

Audien singles chronology
"Insomnia" (2015)	"Something Better" (2015)	"Rooms" (2015)

Lady Antebellum singles chronology
"Long Stretch of Love" (2015)	"Something Better" (2015)	"You Look Good" (2017)

Music video
- "Something Better" on YouTube

"Something Better" is a song by American DJ and electronic music producer Audien from his debut EP, Daydreams, featuring vocals by American country music trio Lady Antebellum. The song was written by Audien, Peter Hanna and Taylor Bird, and produced by Audien.

The song was released to digital retailers through Astralwerks on July 10, 2015 as the EP's second single. On September 1, 2015, it was serviced to American contemporary hit radio via Astralwerks and Capitol Records. The song reached the top of the US Billboard Hot Dance Club Songs chart dated September 26, 2015.

== Background ==
On June 10, 2015, Lady Antebellum performed with DJ and producer Zedd at the year's CMT Music Awards with a mashup of their then-current single "Long Stretch of Love" and Zedd's "Beautiful Now". They revealed to Entertainment Tonight on the red carpet for the event that the performance was "a little bit of a preview" for a crossover song they were releasing with Audien later that summer ("Something Better").

Audien approached Lady Antebellum to record the vocals for the song due to its call-and-response structure and potential for harmonies, characteristics common to the trio's music. He also noted that the group were "some of the best voices ... in overall music" and described the song to Entertainment Weekly as "simply my favorite thing I've ever done." Lady Antebellum member Charles Kelley explained that the group "knew [they] wanted to be part of [the song]" from the first time they heard it as they were "immediately drawn to its great melody and powerful lyric."

The band was open to pushing the boundaries of country music with the song, noting that they had questioned how well their 2010 pop rock-leaning single, "Our Kind of Love", would be received by country radio when it was first released. "We'll always stay true to the country genre," Kelley assured fans, "but that doesn't mean we can't have a little fun."

== Critical reception ==
- Laura McClellan of Taste of Country praised the vocal performances of Lady Antebellum's Hillary Scott and Charles Kelley on the track and described "Something Better" as a "driving, dance-y pop tune you won’t be able to get out of your head."
- Christina Vinson of Taste of Country's sister site The Boot complimented Lady Antebellum for "[pushing] boundaries," noting that the song proves the trio is "not just a top-notch country group," but "a top-notch group, period."
- Jon Freeman of Rolling Stone said that "Hillary Scott and Charles Kelley [of Lady Antebellum] repurpose their signature boy-girl vocals here". He describes the song as "a pop-savvy, piano-driven melody with build-and-release tension that explodes into emotive instrumental passages".

== Music video ==
An accompanying video premiered November 14, 2015 and features a young man who encounters a woman implied to be an alien who is on the run from the authorities. He takes the woman back to his farm, where she reveals special abilities, before the police arrive and the woman is beamed back up into space. Xa -12- 43672

Laura McClellan praised the video for combining "equal parts sci-fi and Americana," representing the song's blending of electronic and music genres.

== Track listings ==
Digital download – single

1. "Something Better" – 3:33

Digital download – remixes

- "Something Better" (Shemce remix) – 3:56
- "Something Better" (Alyson Calagan extended mix) – 7:24
- "Something Better" (Ferreck Dawn remix) – 3:29
- "Something Better" (Kayper remix) – 4:59
- "Something Better" (Möwe remix) – 3:50
- "Something Better" (Two Friends remix) – 4:25

== Chart performance ==
=== Weekly charts ===
Chart (2015)	Peak position
Canada CHR/Top 40 (Billboard)	44
US Bubbling Under Hot 100 (Billboard)	17
US Dance Club Songs (Billboard)	1
US Hot Dance/Electronic Songs (Billboard)	10
US Pop Airplay (Billboard)	29

=== Year-end charts ===
Chart (2015)	Position
US Dance Club Songs (Billboard)	44
US Dance/Mix Show Songs (Billboard)	22
US Hot Dance/Electronic Songs (Billboard)	37
Chart (2016)	Position
US Hot Dance/Electronic Songs (Billboard)	72

== Certifications ==
Region	Certification	Certified units/sales
United States (RIAA)	Gold	500,000^{‡}
^{‡} Sales+streaming figures based on certification alone.

== Release history ==
List of release dates, showing region, release format, release version, and reference
Country	Date	Format	Version	Label(s)	Ref.
North America	July 10, 2015	Digital download	Original	Astralwerks	
United States	September 1, 2015	Contemporary hit radio	Original	Astralwerks; Capitol	
Worldwide	October 16, 2015	Digital download	Shemce remix	Astralwerks	
Worldwide	October 16, 2015	Digital download	Alyson Calagna remix	Astralwerks	
Worldwide	March 18, 2016	Digital download	Ferreck Dawn remix	Astralwerks	
Worldwide	March 18, 2016	Digital download	Kayper remix	Astralwerks	
Worldwide	March 18, 2016	Digital download	Möwe remix	Astralwerks	
Worldwide	June 17, 2016	Digital download	Two Friends remix	Astralwerks	

== See also ==
- List of number-one dance singles of 2015 (U.S.)
