= Trumpets (Sak Noel and Salvi song) =

Single by Sak Noel and Salvi featuring Sean Paul
- Released: 25 April 2016
- Genre: Trap; pop
- Length: 3:26 (Radio mix); 3:55 (Extended mix)
- Label: Barnaton Records
- Songwriters: Isaac Mahmood; Salvi Vilà Carreras; Sean Paul Henriques

Sak Noel singles chronology
| "No Boyfriend (No Problem)" (2014) | "Trumpets" (2016) |

Salvi singles chronology
| "Trumpets" (2016) |

Sean Paul singles chronology
| "Hair" (2016) | "Trumpets" (2016) | "Crick Neck" (2016) |

"Trumpets" is a single by DJ Sak Noel and Salvi featuring Jamaican singer Sean Paul. The song was released on April 25, 2016, on iTunes. The official audio was released on March 13, 2016, and its music video was released on April 24, 2016.

== Chart performance ==
"Trumpets" charted in Romania and Lebanon due to strong radio airplay, and reached number one and number three, respectively.

== Cultural impact ==
In June 2016, just barely a month after its initial release, the song became an instant hit in the Philippines after Filipino comedian Vice Ganda started dancing to the song on the noontime show It's Showtime. This led to a viral dance craze on the Internet called the "Trumpets Challenge"., as well as the longest-running noontime show, Eat Bulaga! had a segment also called the "Trumpets Dance Challenge" after a video announcement from Sak Noel.

== Track listing ==
- Digital download
1. "Trumpets" (featuring Sean Paul) [Radio Mix] – 3:26
2. "Trumpets" (featuring Sean Paul) [Extended Mix] – 3:55

== Charts ==
=== Weekly charts ===
| Chart (2016) | Peak position |
|---|---|
| Belgium (Ultratop 50 Flanders) | 40 |
| Belgium (Ultratop 50 Wallonia) | 43 |
| Colombia (National-Report) | 26 |
| France (SNEP) | 89 |
| Lebanon (Lebanese Top 20) | 3 |
| Netherlands (Dutch Top 40) | 12 |
| Netherlands (Single Top 100) | 28 |
| Poland Dance (ZPAV) | 10 |
| Romania Airplay (Media Forest) | 1 |
| Venezuela (National-Report) | 56 |

=== Year-end charts ===
| Chart (2016) | Position |
|---|---|
| Netherlands (Dutch Top 40) | 76 |
| Netherlands (Single Top 100) | 92 |
