= Rak-Su =

British boy group

- Origin: Watford, England
- Genres: R&B; hip hop; garage
- Years active: 2015–present
- Labels: Syco; RCA
- Members: Ashley Fongho; Jamaal Shurland; Myles Stephenson
- Past members: Mustafa Rahimtulla
- Website: www.raksu-official.com

Rak-Su are an English R&B group, formed in Watford. In 2017, they won the fourteenth series of The X Factor, becoming the first male group to do so. The group is made up of Ashley Fongho, Jamaal Shurland and Myles Stephenson; Mustafa Rahimtulla left the group in November 2020. They finished 2022 with a headline slot at Seal Bay Resort in Selsey, United Kingdom.

"Dimelo", which features Naughty Boy and Wyclef Jean, was released as their winner's single, and marked the first time a winner's single was written by the winner. It entered the UK Singles Chart at number two, behind Ed Sheeran's "Perfect". Their self-titled debut extended play, Rak-Su, was released on 16 February 2018.

== Career ==
=== 2016–2017: Formation and The X Factor ===
Rak-Su are a four-piece group consisting of childhood friends Ashley Fongho, Jamaal Shurland, Myles Stephenson and Mustafa Rahimtulla, from Watford. Fongho and Stephenson had been best friends since the age of 11, recording their freestyles together in their houses. Shurland emigrated from Barbados to Watford at the age of 12 and attended the same school with Stephenson and Rahimtulla. Shurland and Rahimtulla began performing together at the age of 14, and Fongho met and began performing with Rahimtulla at age 16. In their early twenties, Fongho met Shurland at a party after hearing him sing, and the two began recording and performing together, with Stephenson and Rahimtulla attending their recording sessions and live performances. By 2016, the four had decided to form their own music group and soon decided to audition for The X Factor in hopes of gaining exposure for their original material.

In 2017, Rak-Su auditioned for The X Factor in front of judges Simon Cowell, Louis Walsh, Sharon Osbourne and Nicole Scherzinger. Following producers' earlier advice against singing their original material, they began performing "Señorita" by Justin Timberlake until they were stopped by Cowell, who was unimpressed and requested a different song. They then performed an original song called "I'm Feeling You", and received four "Yes" votes from the judges, who praised the group for their originality, and Cowell noted that they would not have passed their audition on their first song alone.

After the first bootcamp challenge, the group continued to perform their original material, reaching the six-chair challenge in the "Groups" category, mentored by Cowell. They passed the six-chair challenge with their original song "Change Your Mind" and after they performed their song "Palm Tree" at the judges houses' round in front of Cowell, and his assistant and former X Factor judge Cheryl. Cowell proceeded to put them through to the live shows.

During the live shows, they continued to perform mainly original material, with two cover versions with additional raps by Fongho and Stephenson. They were runners-up of the Prize Fight in week 1 against Grace Davies and week 2 against Kevin Davy White, and were eventually voted as winners of the Prize Fight in week 4 against Davies, leading to a songwriting session with American songwriter Ali Tamposi as the reward. With the eliminations of Jack & Joel in week 3, Sean and Conor Price in the quarter-final and The Cutkelvins in the semi-final, Rak-Su became Cowell's remaining act in the competition. They made it to the final on the weekend of 2 December 2017, alongside Davy White and Davies. After Davy White was eliminated on Saturday's show, they were in the top two with Davies and finished as the winners with over 50% of the public vote.

Rak-Su are the second group to win the show after Little Mix in 2011, and the only male group to win the show. On 3 December 2017, their winners' single was added to streaming services as well as being available for download immediately after the final, with profits going towards the charities Together for Short Lives and Shooting Star Chase. It placed at number 6 on the Official Singles Chart Update two days after the final. Four of their songs topped the iTunes chart during their run on the X Factor — "Mamacita", "Dimelo", "Mona Lisa" and "I'm Feeling You" - but were ineligible for the Official Chart and were not available on streaming services at that time. After the voting stats were revealed Rak-Su were the clear winners. They won every week, except for week 3 on Saturday, where they came 2nd when Kevin Davy White overtook them by a tight edge of 1% of the votes.

The X Factor performances and results
Show	Song choice	Theme	Result
Auditions	"Señorita" – Justin Timberlake/"I'm Feeling You" – Original song	—N/a	Through to bootcamp round 1
Bootcamp Round 1	"24K Magic" – Bruno Mars (with Charlie Cammish, Riley Peters, Jack Morgan & New Dynamixx)	—N/a	Through to bootcamp round 2
Bootcamp Round 2	"Knock, Knock" – Original song	—N/a	Through to six-chair challenge
Six-chair challenge	"Change Your Mind" - Original Song	—N/a	Through to judges' houses
Judges' houses	"Mamacita" – Original song/"Palm Tree" – Original song	—N/a	Through to live shows
Live show 1	"Mamacita" – Original song	Express Yourself	Safe (1st)
Live show 2	"Dimelo" – Original song	Viva Latino	Safe (1st)
Live show 3	"Faith" – George Michael	George Michael	Safe (2nd)
Quarter-Final	"Mona Lisa" – Original song	Crazy in Love	Safe (1st)
Semi-Final	"Flowers" – Sweet Female Attitude	Cool Britannia	Safe (1st)
Semi-Final	"I'm Feeling You" – Original song	Get Me to the Final	Safe (1st)
Final	"Mamacita" – Original song	Free Choice	Safe (1st)
Final	"Dimelo" – Original song (with Naughty Boy & Wyclef Jean)	Celebrity Duet/Winners Single	Safe (1st)
Final	"Touché" – Original song	Song to Win	Winners (51.7%)
Final	"Mona Lisa" – Original song	Song of the Series	Winners (51.7%)

=== 2018–2019: Post-X Factor career ===
On 16 February 2018, they released a self-titled EP including the songs "Mamacita", "Dimelo", "Mona Lisa" and "I'm Feeling You". On 30 March 2018 they performed live on The X Factor Denmark with their single "Dimelo". On 23 May 2018, it was announced that Rak-Su would support Little Mix on their Summer Hits Tour 2018. On 29 June 2018, they released "Pyro Ting" with Banx & Ranx. On 28 September 2018, Rak-Su released their new single "I Want You To Freak", with the official video released on 5 October 2018. On 6 October 2018, it was announced that Rak-Su will support Olly Murs on his You Know, I Know Tour in 2019. On 21 October 2018, Rak-Su returned to The X Factor to perform their new single "I Want You To Freak" on the first results show.

On 10 November 2018 it was announced that both Rak-Su and Little Mix parted ways with Syco Music, with the label stating that they would no longer work with Modest! Management, who manages both acts, and facilitating a transfer to RCA Records. On 22 February 2019, they released their second EP, Rome. On 5 April 2019, Rak-Su released their new single "Yours or Mine". On 5 July 2019, they released their single "Rotate (Clockwise)".

On 29 August 2019, it was reported that Rak-Su had been dropped from RCA due to lack of mainstream chart success.

=== 2019–2021: Independent releases and lineup change ===
On 8 November 2019, Rak-Su released "La Bomba", their first single as independent artists, followed by "Girl" in December. In 2020, they released "Palm Trees", a song they had performed during the Judges' Houses stage of The X Factor, and "Who Am I? (Black Lives Matter)", in response to the Black Lives Matter movement. Their other releases that year included "Girls Like You", featuring Celina Sharma.

In November 2020, the group announced that Mustafa Rahimtulla would take a hiatus because of mental health difficulties. The remaining members, Ashley Fongho, Jamaal Shurland and Myles Stephenson, continued as a trio, releasing "No Contest" in December.

Subsequent releases included "Left Right", featuring Donel, and their third extended play, Lost Tour, in April 2021. Later that year, they released the mixtape Finally Free and collaborated with other artists, including Romano and Laidback Luke.

In 2022, Rak-Su released further collaborative singles, including "Temporary Love" with Tom Ferry and TWNTY24, "Just a Friend" with AJ Moreno, and "Neymar".

=== 2022–present: Later releases and collaborations ===
Rak-Su continued releasing music independently in the following years. In July 2024, they announced plans to release new music regularly, beginning with "Role Play". Subsequent releases included "Check for Me", "Medina", "Close My Eyes", "F With You" and "Masterpiece", followed by further singles later that year.

In 2025, Rak-Su continued releasing singles and collaborating with other artists. Their releases included "Show Me" and "Eastside" with Late Checkout, "Patience" with andrë and TWNTY4, "Tropicana" with Danéx, and "Proud of You", released in November.

== Members ==
- Ashley Fongho (2016–present)
- Jamaal Shurland (2016–present)
- Myles Stephenson (2016–present)
- Mustafa Rahimtulla (2016–2020)

== Discography ==
=== Extended plays ===
Title	Details
Dive	Released: 3 April 2017; Label: Independent; Formats: Digital download
Rak-Su	Released: 16 February 2018; Label: Syco; Formats: Digital download
Rome	Released: 22 February 2019; Label: RCA; Formats: Digital download
Lost Tour	Released: 23 April 2021; Label: Independent; Formats: Digital download

==== Collaborative Extended plays ====
Title	Details
Top Floor (with Late Checkout)	Released: 12 March 2025; Label: Independent; Formats: Digital download

=== Mixtapes ===
Title	Details
Finally Free	Released: 10 September 2021; Label: Independent; Formats: Digital download

=== Singles ===
Title	Year	Peak chart positions			Certifications	Album
Title	Year	UK	IRE	SCO	Certifications	Album
"Flights"	2016	—	—	—		Non-album singles
"Last Night" (with Charles Dixon)	2016	—	—	—		Non-album singles
"Dimelo" (featuring Wyclef Jean and Naughty Boy)	2017	2	29	2	BPI: Gold	Non-album singles
"Pyro Ting" (with Banx & Ranx)	2018	—	—	—		Non-album singles
"I Want You to Freak"	2018	39	82	17		Non-album singles
"Yours or Mine"	2019	—	—	—		Non-album singles
"Rotate (Clockwise)"	2019	—	—	—		Non-album singles
"La Bomba"	2019	—	—	—		Non-album singles
"Girl"	2019	—	—	—		Non-album singles
"Palm Trees"	2020	—	—	—		Non-album singles
"Who Am I? (Black Lives Matter)"	2020	—	—	—		Non-album singles
"Girls Like You" (featuring Celina Sharma)	2020	—	—	—		Lost Tour
"No Contest"	2020	—	—	—		Lost Tour
"Left Right" (featuring Donel)	2021	—	—	—		Lost Tour
"Tongue Tied" (with Romano)	2021	—	—	—		Non-album single
"Statement" (with Lenny Loso)	2021	—	—	—		Finally Free
"Over & Over" (with Laidback Luke)	2021	—	—	—		Non-album singles
"Temporary Love" (with Tom Ferry and TWNTY24)	2022	—	—	—		Non-album singles
"Just a Friend" (with AJ Moreno)	2022	—	—	—		Non-album singles
"Neymar"	2022	—	—	—		Non-album singles
"Role Play"	2024	—	—	—		Close Your Eyes
"Check For Me"	2024	—	—	—		Close Your Eyes
"Medina"	2024	—	—	—		Close Your Eyes
"Close Your Eyes"	2024	—	—	—		Close Your Eyes
"F with You"	2024	—	—	—		F with You
"Masterpiece"	2024	—	—	—		Masterpiece
"Another Lover"	2024	—	—	—		Another Lover
"Translate"	2024	—	—	—		Translate
"Cyclone"	2024	—	—	—		Cyclone
"Show Me" (with Late Checkout)	2025	—	—	—		Top Floor
"What You Like"	2025	—	—	—		What You Like
"Patience" (with andrë and TWNTY4)	2025	—	—	—		TBA
"Eastside" (with Late Checkout)	2025	—	—	—		Top Floor
"Tropicana" (with Danéx)	2025	—	—	—		Tropicana
"Top Floor" (with Late Checkout)	2025	—	—	—		Top Floor
"Proud of You"	2025	—	—	—		TBA
"—" denotes a single that did not chart or was not released in that territory.

=== Guest appearances ===
Title	Year	Artist(s)	Album
"No Tally"	2021	Tom Ferry, Embody	Shapes

== Concert tours ==
=== Headlining ===
- Rak-Su - The Scenic Route Tour (2019)
- Rak-Su (2021)

=== Supporting ===
- The X Factor Live Tour (2018)
- Little Mix - Summer Hits Tour 2018 (2018)
- Olly Murs - You Know I Know Tour (2019)

== Notes ==
Awards and achievements
Preceded by Matt Terry	Winner of The X Factor; 2017	Succeeded by Dalton Harris
Preceded by When Christmas Comes Around	Winner's singles of The X Factor; Dimelo	Succeeded by The Power of Love
