= Norin & Rad =

American electronic music duo

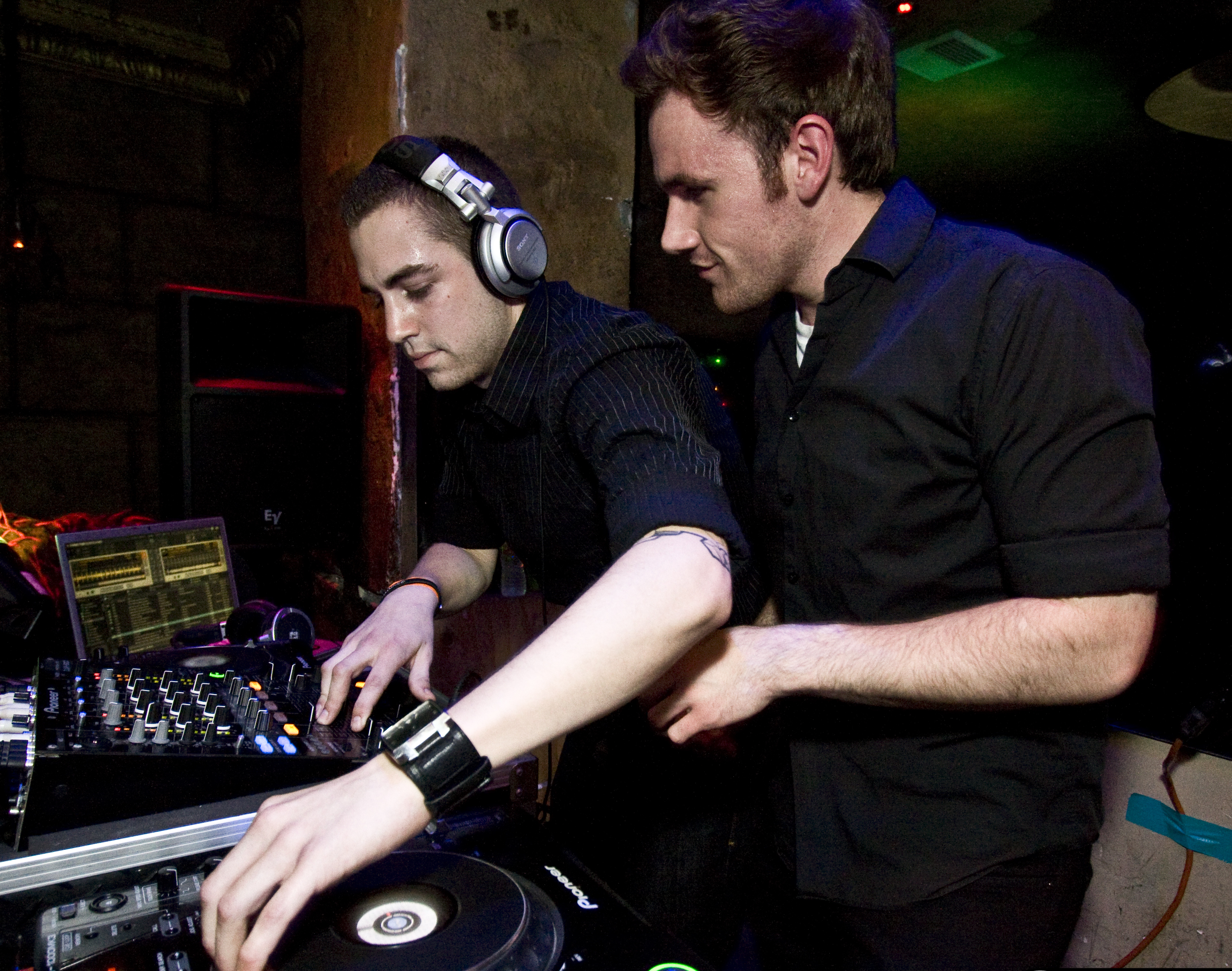
- Nick Sember & Bruce Karlsson in 2011

Background information
- Origin: Orange County, California, United States
- Genres: Electronic music
- Years active: 2009 — 2014
- Labels: Anjunabeats, Enhanced Recordings, Armada, Air Up There Recordings
- Members: Nick Sember (Rad)
- Past members: Bruce Karlsson (Norin)
- Website: www.norinandrad.com/

Norin & Rad is an American electronic music duo of producers and DJs from California named Bruce Karlsson (Norin) and Nick Sember (Rad). Their name is derived from the original name of the comic book character, Silver Surfer, Norrin Radd. Bruce Karlsson and Nick Sember both had strong interests in music at very young ages. Nick began to mix hip-hop in high school, but the true creativity came when he was given his first trance record.

They had a podcast, The Remedy, which can be found on iTunes, Mixcloud, as well as their website. Norin & Rad performed for Above & Beyond's radio show Trance Around the World 450.

== History ==
When Bruce and Nick met in 2007 they found a mutual interest in Electronic Dance Music and how it was made, and Norin & Rad was created soon after. Bruce started learning music production programs shortly after graduating high school. He created his own techniques along the way that have helped identify Norin & Rad's sound. Sember's musical interest began when he learned how to play guitar among other instruments, from his father. He then bought his first set of vinyl turntables in high school where he started mixing hip hop, but progressed to dance music after meeting Karlsson.

Norin & Rad have remixed some of the top names in trance such as Above & Beyond, Andy Moor, Armin Van Buuren and more.

Upon hitting the festival circuit in 2012–2013, they packed popular clubs like Exchange LA, Sutra OC, and the Ruby Skye in San Francisco. They have performed at some of the biggest festivals around the world such as EDC in Las Vegas, Electric Zoo in New York and Tomorrowland in Belgium.

In November 2014, Nick Sember posted on Facebook that Bruce Karlsson had indeed left Norin & Rad. Sember went on to say that he will be continuing Norin & Rad himself along with his self-titled solo project. However, no new releases from the former project have materialized. Karlsson has since joined supergroup Bad Royale and dance music group Fatum.

== Originals Discography ==
=== Singles/EPs ===
- 2010 - "Pandemonium / Varuna" EP (Well Mixed Recordings)
- 2011 - "The Gift" (vs. Recurve) (Air Up There Recordings)
- 2011 - "Thrust / Triumph" (vs. Audien) (Air Up There Recordings)
- 2012 - "Bloom" (Anjunabeats)
- 2012 - "Pistol Whip / Zion" (Anjunabeats)
- 2012 - "Retrograde" (Enhanced Recordings)
- 2012 - "Five Finger Death Punch / DeVas" (Anjunabeats)
- 2013 - "Aldo" (Anjunabeats)
- 2013 - "Bird Is The Word" (Anjunabeats)
- 2014 - "Thundercat / That Was Easy" (Anjunabeats)
- 2014 - "Good Life" (vs. Maor Levi feat. Jack Miz) (Zerothree Music)
