= Saturn Return (Rêve album) =

Studio album by Rêve
- Released: 20 October 2023
- Genre: Dance-pop
- Length: 39:48
- Labels: 31 East; Universal Music Canada
- Producers: Banx & Ranx; Tim Buron; Max-Antoine Gendron; Derek Hoffman; Casper Koelman; Aaron Paris; Carl Ryden; Joel Stouffer; Mike Wise

Rêve chronology
Layover (2022)	Saturn Return (2023)	Delusions of Grandeur (2026)

Singles from Saturn Return
- 1. "Ctrl + Alt + Del" Released: 17 September 2021; 2. "Tongue" Released: 29 June 2022; 3. "Whitney" Released: 28 October 2022; 4. "Hypersexual" Released: 2 December 2022; 5. "Big Boom" Released: 2 June 2023; 6. "Contemporary Love" Released: 21 July 2023; 7. "Breaking Up with Jesus" Released: 6 October 2023

Saturn Return is the debut studio album by Canadian singer-songwriter Rêve. The album was released on 20 October 2023 through 31 East and Universal Music Canada.

The album received a Juno Award nomination for Pop Album of the Year at the Juno Awards of 2024, and Joel Stouffer was nominated for Producer of the Year for the songs "Whitney" and "Breaking Up with Jesus".

== Track listing ==
Saturn Return track listing
No.	Title	Writer(s)	Producer(s)	Length
1.	"Breaking Up with Jesus"	Briannah Donolo; Ali Milner; Martina Sorbara; Joel Stouffer	Stouffer	2:57
2.	"Disco at the Strip Club"	Donolo; Carl Ryden	Ryden	3:07
3.	"Contemporary Love"	Donolo; Mike Wise	Wise	2:47
4.	"Big Boom"	Donolo; Peter Hanna; Yannick Rastogi; Zacharie Raymond	Banx & Ranx	2:14
5.	"CTRL + ALT + DEL"	Donolo; Rastogi; Raymond	Banx & Ranx	2:33
6.	"Hypersexual"	Donolo; Hanna; Rastogi; Raymond	Banx & Ranx	2:18
7.	"EX EX EX (Whoops)"	Donolo; Elizabeth Boland; Rastogi; Raymond	Banx & Ranx	2:23
8.	"Tongue"	Donolo; Kirstyn Johnson; Bryn McCutcheon; Liam O'Donnell; Ryden	Ryden	2:13
9.	"My My (What a Life)"	Donolo; Tim Buron; Clément Langlois-Légaré	Banx & Rax; Buron	2:41
10.	"Past Life"	Donolo	Derek Hoffman; Slater Manzo^{[a]}	4:23
11.	"Whitney"	Donolo; Nickolas Ashford; Valerie Simpson; Stouffer	Banx & Ranx; Aaron Paris; Stouffer	3:11
12.	"Release Me"	Donolo; Max-Antoine Gendron	Gendron; Casper Koelman	5:09
13.	"Saturn Return"	Donolo; Ryden	Ryden	3:52
Total length:				39:48

Note

- ^{^[a]} signifies an additional producer.

== Personnel ==
Musicians

- Rêve – vocals
- Aaron Paris – viola (tracks 2, 12); cello, string arrangement (2); violin (12)
- Carl Ryden – programming (2)
- Mike Wise – programming (3)
- Zacharie Raymond – keyboards (4, 6), programming (5, 7, 9, 11)
- Yannick Rastogi – keyboards (4, 6), programming (5, 7, 9, 11)
- Carl Ryden – programming (8, 13); guitar, keyboards (8)
- Bryn McCutcheon – additional vocals (8)
- Kirstyn Johnson – additional vocals (8)
- Tim Buron – programming (9)
- Derek Hoffman – piano (10)
- The Ai – strings (10)
- Brendan Rogers – cello (11)
- Joel Stouffer – programming (11)
- Casper Koelman – programming (12)
- Max-Antoine Gendron – programming (12)

Technical

- Nathan Dantzler – mastering (1–4, 6–13)
- Kyle Mangels – mixing (1–4, 6–13)
- Nk.F – mastering, mixing (5)
- Joel Stouffer – engineering (1)
- Carl Ryden – engineering (2, 8, 13)
- Josh Polasz – engineering (2)
- Dave Mohasci – engineering (3)
- Mike Wise – engineering (3)
- Zacharie Raymond – engineering (4–7, 9, 11)
- Yannick Rastogi – engineering (4–7, 9)
- Tim Buron – engineering (9)
- Derek Hoffman – engineering (10)
- Slater Manzo – engineering (10)
- Bluxz Brando – engineering (11)
- Casper Koelman – engineering (12)
- Max-Antoine Gendron – engineering (12)

== Release history ==
Release dates and formats for Saturn Return
Region	Date	Format(s)	Label	Ref.
Various	20 October 2023	CD; digital download; LP; streaming	31 East; Universal Music Canada	
