= Ctrl + Alt + Del (Rêve song) =

2021 single by Rêve

Single by Rêve

from the album Saturn Return
- Released: September 17, 2021
- Genre: Electronic
- Length: 2:33
- Label: Universal Music Canada; 31 East
- Songwriters: Rêve; Yannick Rastogi; Zacharie Raymond
- Producer: Banx & Ranx

Rêve singles chronology
"Skin 2 Skin" (2021)	"Ctrl + Alt + Del" (2021)	"Layover" (2022)

"Ctrl + Alt + Del" (stylised in all caps) is a song by Canadian singer and songwriter Rêve. It was released on September 17, 2021 through Universal Music Canada and 31 East. It is included on her debut studio album, Saturn Return (2023).

== Background and development ==
The song was written with Banx & Ranx during the COVID-19 pandemic. Rêve has said that after a period of writing more serious music, she and her collaborators wanted to write "something silly and goofy and fun", and that the song is a tribute to missing live music and dancing during lockdown.

The track was featured in the video game FIFA 22. It was also used as a lip-sync track on the third season of Canada's Drag Race. Rêve later appeared as a guest judge on the fourth season in which her song "Tongue" was also used as a lip-sync track.

== Reception ==
Music magazine Nagamag praised the song, saying, "A funky hip nu-skool electro groove that captured our attention. It's clean and danceable, her voice is inspiring, and we loved the muffled out techno vocoder approach. This one will surely rock the dancefloors across the globe.".

== Commercial performance ==
"Ctrl + Alt + Del" was Rêve's first entry on the Canadian Hot 100, debuting at number 92 on the chart dated October 23, 2021, and later peaking at number 38. It spent 29 total weeks on the chart. The song additionally reached number 7 on the Canadian CHR/Top 40 chart and number 28 on the Canadian Adult Contemporary chart.

In June 2023, it was certified Double Platinum by Music Canada for selling over 160,000 units in the country.

== Awards ==
"Ctrl + Alt + Del" won a Dance Music Award at the 2022 SOCAN Awards and Dance Recording of the Year at the 2023 Juno Awards. The song was additionally nominated for a Dance Award at the 2024 Hollywood Independent Music Awards.

Year	Award	Category	Result
2022	SOCAN Awards	Dance Music Award	Won
2023	Juno Awards	Dance Recording of the Year	Won
2024	Hollywood Independent Music Awards	Dance Award	Nominated

== Music video ==
The music video was released alongside the single on September 17, 2021. Conceived by Anthony Hachez and directed by Adem Boutlidja, the video depicts a series of versions of Rêve caught in a continuous looping sequence inspired by the song's title. The clip features a surreal and futuristic aesthetic, with its visuals intended to reflect the song's 1990s-inspired sound.

== Charts ==
Chart (2021–2022)	Peak position
Canada (Canadian Hot 100)	38
Canada AC (Billboard)	28
Canada CHR/Top 40 (Billboard)	7
Canada Hot AC (Billboard)	22
