= Crick Neck =

2016 single by Sean Paul

Single by Sean Paul featuring Chi Ching Ching
- Released: 26 August 2016
- Recorded: 2015
- Genre: Hip hop
- Length: 2:37
- Label: Island Records
- Songwriters: Sean Paul Henriques; Yannick Rastogi; Zacharie Raymond; Jordan McClure; David Hayle; Radion Beckford
- Producers: BANX & RANX, Chimney

Sean Paul singles chronology
"Trumpets" (2016)	"Crick Neck" (2016)	"Rockabye" (2016)

"Crick Neck" is a song by Jamaican dancehall recording artist Sean Paul, featuring vocals from Chi Ching Ching. The song was released as a digital download in the United Kingdom on 26 August 2016 through Island Records. The song was written by Sean Paul Henriques, Yannick Rastogi, Zacharie Raymond, Jordan McClure, David Hayle and Radion Beckford. Production was handled by Banx & Ranx (Yannick Rastogi & Zacharie Raymond) and Chimney (Jordan McClure & David Hayle). The song peaked at 140 on the UK Singles Chart.

== Charts ==
Chart (2016)	Peak position
UK Singles (OCC)	140

== Release history ==
Region	Date	Format	Label
United Kingdom	26 August 2016	Digital download	Island Records

== See also ==
- Crick in the neck
