= Dimelo =

Single by Rak-Su featuring Wyclef Jean and Naughty Boy
- Released: 3 December 2017
- Recorded: November–December 2017
- Genre: Latin pop; R&B
- Length: 2:47 (solo version); 3:02 (single version)
- Label: Syco
- Songwriters: Ashley Fongo; Jamaal Shurland; Myles Stephenson; Mustafa Rahimtulla; Wyclef Jean; Brahim Fouradi; Carlos Vrolijk; Edwin Serrano; Ian Franzino; Andrew Haas
- Producers: Wesley Muoria-Chaves; KIN; BIFFCO; Naughty Boy

Rak-Su singles chronology
"Last Night" (2016)	"Dimelo" (2017)	"Pyro Ting" (2018)

Wyclef Jean singles chronology
"Turn Me Good" (2017)	"Dimelo" (2017)	"Sak Kap Fet" (2018)

Naughty Boy singles chronology
"One Chance to Dance" (2017)	"Dimelo" (2017)	"All or Nothing" (2018)

"Dimelo" is a song by British group Rak-Su, released after their victory on the fourteenth series of The X Factor as the winner's single. The group first performed the song on week two of the live shows as part of Latino Week. They performed it again in the final, this time with featured vocals from Wyclef Jean and production from Naughty Boy, with this version released as their first official single. The original solo version of the track was recorded in the studio before its first performance on The X Factor. "Dimelo" placed at number 2 on the Official UK Singles Chart, held back from the top spot by Ed Sheeran's "Perfect". The song has also been successful on streaming sites, entering the UK top 50 daily chart on Spotify.

The song assimilates into reggaeton, a genre common in Spanish language music. It pays tribute to Latino singers Jennifer Lopez, Camila Cabello and Shakira. A solo version of the song was featured on the group's self-titled debut extended play, Rak-Su.

== Track listing ==
Digital download
No.	Title	Length
1.	"Dimelo" (featuring Wyclef Jean and Naughty Boy)	3:02

== Charts ==
Chart (2017)	Peak position
Ireland (IRMA)	29
New Zealand Heatseekers (RMNZ)	8
Scotland Singles (Official Charts)	2
UK Singles (Official Charts)	2

== Certifications ==
Region	Certification	Certified units/sales
United Kingdom (BPI)	Gold	400,000^{‡}
^{‡} Sales+streaming figures based on certification alone.

== Release history ==
Region	Date	Format	Label
United Kingdom	3 December 2017	Digital download; streaming	Syco Music
