= Audien =

American DJ and producer

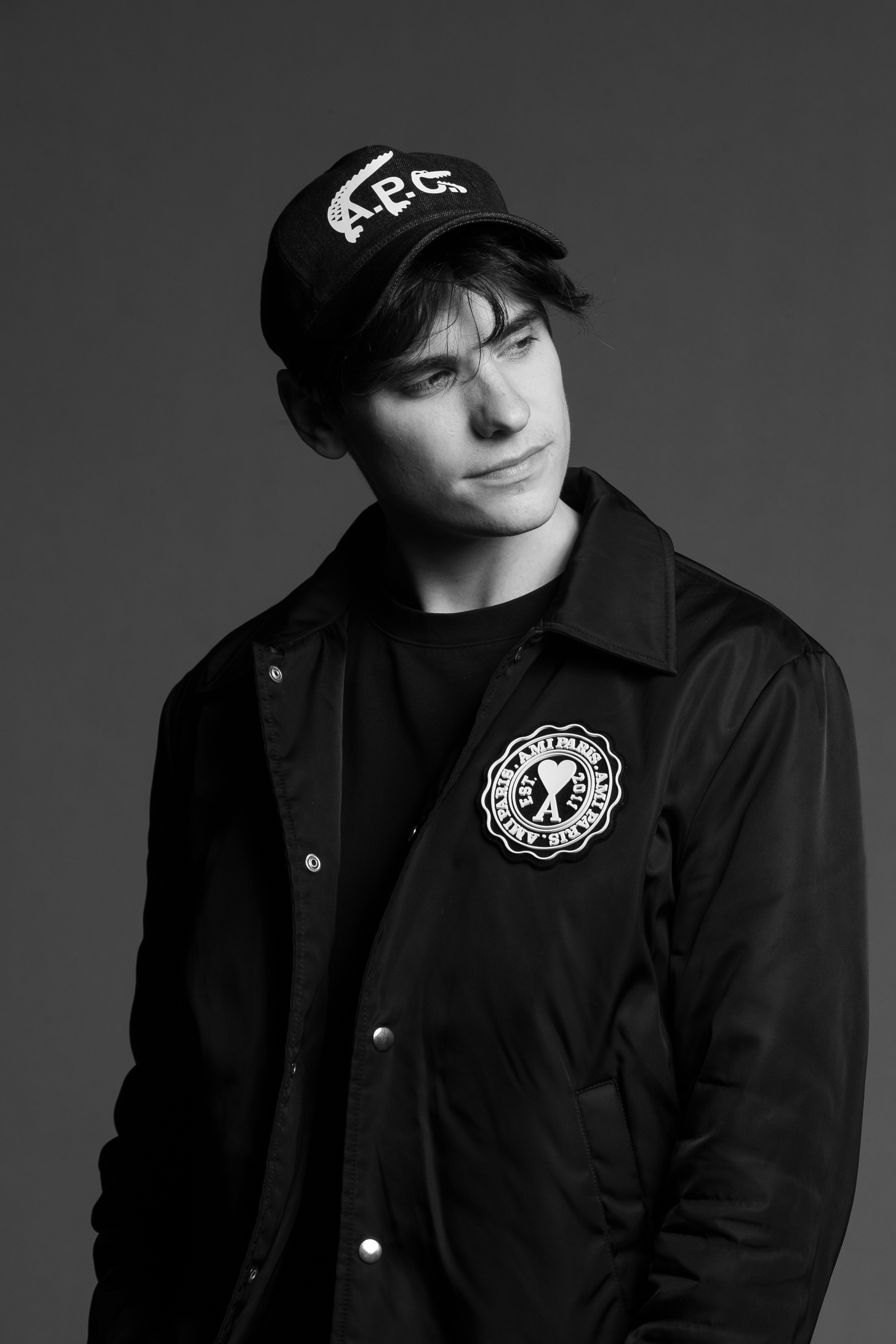
- Audien at Resorts World Las Vegas, 2023

Background information
- Born: Nathaniel Rathbun; January 11, 1992 (age 34); New London, Connecticut, U.S.
- Genres: EDM; progressive house
- Occupations: Record producer; DJ; musician
- Instruments: Keyboards; turntable; Logic Pro
- Years active: 2009–present
- Labels: Astralwerks; Anjunabeats; Armada; Spinnin'
- Website: www.audiendj.com

Nathaniel "Nate" Rathbun (born January 11, 1992), better known under his stage name Audien, is an American DJ and electronic music producer. Audien has released many singles and remixes for electronic record labels including Enhanced, Perceptive, Armada, Black Hole, and Nervous. His tracks have appeared on Corsten's Countdown, Tiësto's Club Life, Above & Beyond's Trance Around The World, and Armin van Buuren's A State of Trance compilations.

== Career ==
Rathbun was born in Mystic, Connecticut, into a musical household. His mother is a jazz aficionado. In 2008, he was introduced to electronic dance music through trance songs in video game soundtracks. Fascinated by the sound of trance, he learned to recreate songs from Armin Van Buuren's A State of Trance podcasts.

At age 17, Audien was first signed to Dutch producer and DJ Ferry Corsten's label Flashover Recordings. The label released Audien's first single, "Rise & Shine".

In 2012, Audien began to include elements of progressive house into his music with the release of "These Are The Days". Audien's August 2012 release "Eventide" is noted for being played by Above & Beyond during their DJ set at the 2012 Electric Daisy Carnival in Las Vegas. Audien's track "Sup" was featured by Dutch icon Hardwell on episode 87 of Hardwell on Air. In 2013, Above & Beyond premiered Audien's track "Wayfarer" as the first song ever played on Above & Beyond Group Therapy.

In 2014, Audien played at Tomorrowland.

In 2015, Audien signed to Astralwerks and released his debut EP called 'Daydreams' with the track "Rooms". He received a 2015 Grammy Nomination for Best Remixed Recording, Non-Classical for his remix of the Bastille song, "Pompeii". On March 2, 2015, Audien released the single "Insomnia". "Insomnia" peaked at number one on the US Dance Charts. His 2015 track "Something Better" featuring Lady Antebellum cracked the Billboard Top 40 in Pop Songs marking Audien's first appearance on a pop chart. The track had already gone to number 1 on Billboard's Dance Club Songs chart on September 26, 2015. In 2015, Audien announced his 'Audacity' Tour and played music festivals EDC Vegas, EDC Brazil, TomorrowWorld, and Electric Zoo.

In 2016, Audien performed at Lollapalooza's 25th year. Audien released "Crazy Love" featuring Deb's Daughter in August 2016. The track hit #1 on the Mediabase Dance Airplay Chart twice.

In 2017, Audien and MAX released the track "One More Weekend". In January 2017, Audien's US Tour "Feels Trip" was announced. Audien was on the lineup for Electric Zoo 2017. On 18 June 2017, Audien collaborated with 3lau to produce "Hot Water", which is a trap-influenced track fusing melodic & heavy components. On 15 September 2017, Audien released his debut EP titled Some Ideas on label Astralwerks. The three-track EP contains a variety of genres, including "Rampart" which is a collaboration with hardstyle producer Gammer and "Message" whose sounds are based on his older Anjunabeats releases.

Audien returned to Anjunabeats on 13 July 2018 with his release of "Higher" through the label, followed by "Never Letting Go" with Arty on 9 November 2018.

In November 2019, Audien released his LP Escapism. A definitive effort encapsulating both Audien's signature style and his dominance in the dance landscape, which included hit songs "Reach" featuring Jamie Hartman and "Buzzing" with Nevve.

Following Escapism; Audien returned to Armada Music has continued to release music while honing in on his signature sound and style. In 2021 he signed with Armada and put out 3 singles that year — one of them being "Wish It Was You" featuring Cate Downey, which has brought energy and emotion back to the dance floor and ultimately became the #1 Dance Radio record. Following up in 2022 he released the #1 Dance Radio record; One Last Dance ft Xira which also became a #1 Dance Radio Record.

In 2022 Audien launched the Progressive House Never Died brand. Which featured a debut at Miami Music Week and then led to a 100% sold out North American tour featuring a Hollywood Palladium as well as the most talked about EDC set. In 2022 Audien also performed Escapade Music Festival in Ottawa, Audiotistic Bay Area, Heatwave Festival in Chicago, Moonrise Festival in Baltimore, Breakaway Music Festival in Ohio, Lost In Dreams Festival in Las Vegas as well as played Red Rocks for the first time with Zedd.

He followed up the tour with 2 back-to-back records on Armada; Drifting Away ft Joe Jury which reached the #2 spot on Dance Radio charts and Drifting Away ft Jordan Grace.

To begin 2023, he released Antidote ft. JT Roach; a progressive house anthem and sold out 'Progressive House Never Died NYC' at Avant Gardner; which sold 500 tickets in the first 60 seconds of on-sale. To follow up the PHND show on April 21, 2023, he played at the L.A. Memorial Coliseum in July as his debut Stay-True headline show. In the early fall of 2023, he released a new single, titled "Superhero".

=== Residences ===
Audien has had Las Vegas residences at Marquee in 2015, and at Encore Las Vegas's XS Nightclub and Encore Beach Club in 2016.

During the summer of 2017, Audien had a Las Vegas residency at Drai's Beachclub and Nightclub. Starting in 2022, Audien became a Vegas resident DJ at Zouk Nightclub and AYU Dayclub at Resorts World.

== Discography ==
Studio albums

- Escapism (2019)
- First Love (2025)

== See also ==
- List of artists who reached number one on the US Dance chart
