= Alx Veliz =

- Born: Max Alexander Bernard; Toronto, Ontario, Canada
- Genres: Pop; electronic; Latin
- Occupations: Singer, songwriter, producer
- Years active: 2014–present
- Labels: Universal Canada; Mercury Records; 1916 Music
- Website: alxveliz.com

Alx Veliz is a Canadian singer-songwriter from Toronto, Ontario. He is best known for his hit single, "Dancing Kizomba".

== Early life ==
Veliz is of Guatemalan and Jamaican descent. One of his grandmothers immigrated from Jamaica to Guatemala when she was sixteen. His grew up in a musical Guatemalan family, he started performing from a young age. By age 10, he was songwriting and rapping. In his teens, he delved deeper into production and rhythm, learning bass and drumming. Veliz grew up in Brampton, Ontario.

== Career ==
After signing with Universal Music Canada in 2015, he stormed the Billboard charts with his debut single "Dancing Kizomba," named after the Angolan dance movement that combines Western ballroom dance with African elements. The single was recorded in English and Spanish, both born from his desire to honor his roots and to increase exposure for Canadian-Latin music artists. Produced by Medy Landia, "Dancing Kizomba" combined a positive energy with Veliz' global style. "Dancing Kizomba" received over 35 million streams on Spotify and multiple remixes including a version with Don Omar. His music is described as "synth-driven, Latin-rhythm-infused pop."

== Discography ==
=== EPs ===
Title
Love Has No Language
Album details
- Release date: April 22, 2016
- Record labels: Universal Music Canada, 1916 Music, Mercury Records
- Format: Digital download
Notes

No.	Title	Length
1.	"Let It Out"	3:11
2.	"Jungle"	3:33
3.	"Dancing Kizomba"	3:14
4.	"U+Me"	3:18
5.	"Heroes & Villains"	4:22
6.	"Ese Hombre Soy Yo"	3:43

=== Singles ===
Year	Title	Peak chart positions			Certifications	Album
Year	Title	CAN	CAN CHR	US Latin Pop	Certifications	Album
2015	"Dancing Kizomba"	62	10	35	CAN: Gold; SPA: Platinum	Love Has No Language
2016	"U+Me"	—	—	—		Love Has No Language
2017	"Duele (Hurts Me To Love You)"	—	—	—		TBA
2017	"Higher"	—	—	—		TBA
2018	"Más Más"	—	—	—		TBA
2019	"Boom Bye Bye"	—	—	—		TBA
