= William Cloutier =

Canadian pop singer

William Cloutier is a Canadian pop singer from Victoriaville, Quebec, mostly noted as the 2021 winner of Star Académie.

During his run on Star Académie, he was granted permission to be temporarily absent from the competition when his wife, Sara Dagenais, went into labour and gave birth to their son Éloi.

He released his debut album On ira in 2022, and supported the album with a concert tour alongside Lunou Zucchini, another Star Académie finalist. On ira received a Félix Award nomination for Pop Album of the Year at the 44th Félix Awards.

Cloutier has also had roles as an actor, including voicing the role of Lyle in the francophone dub of Lyle, Lyle, Crocodile, and playing Johnny Rockfort in a production of the musical Starmania.

He released his second album, L'amour, in March 2025. It features songs he wrote entirely himself.

On October 27, 2026, he was announced among the participants of Canada's Choice, the Canadian national final for the Eurovision Song Contest 2027.
