= Rêve (singer) =

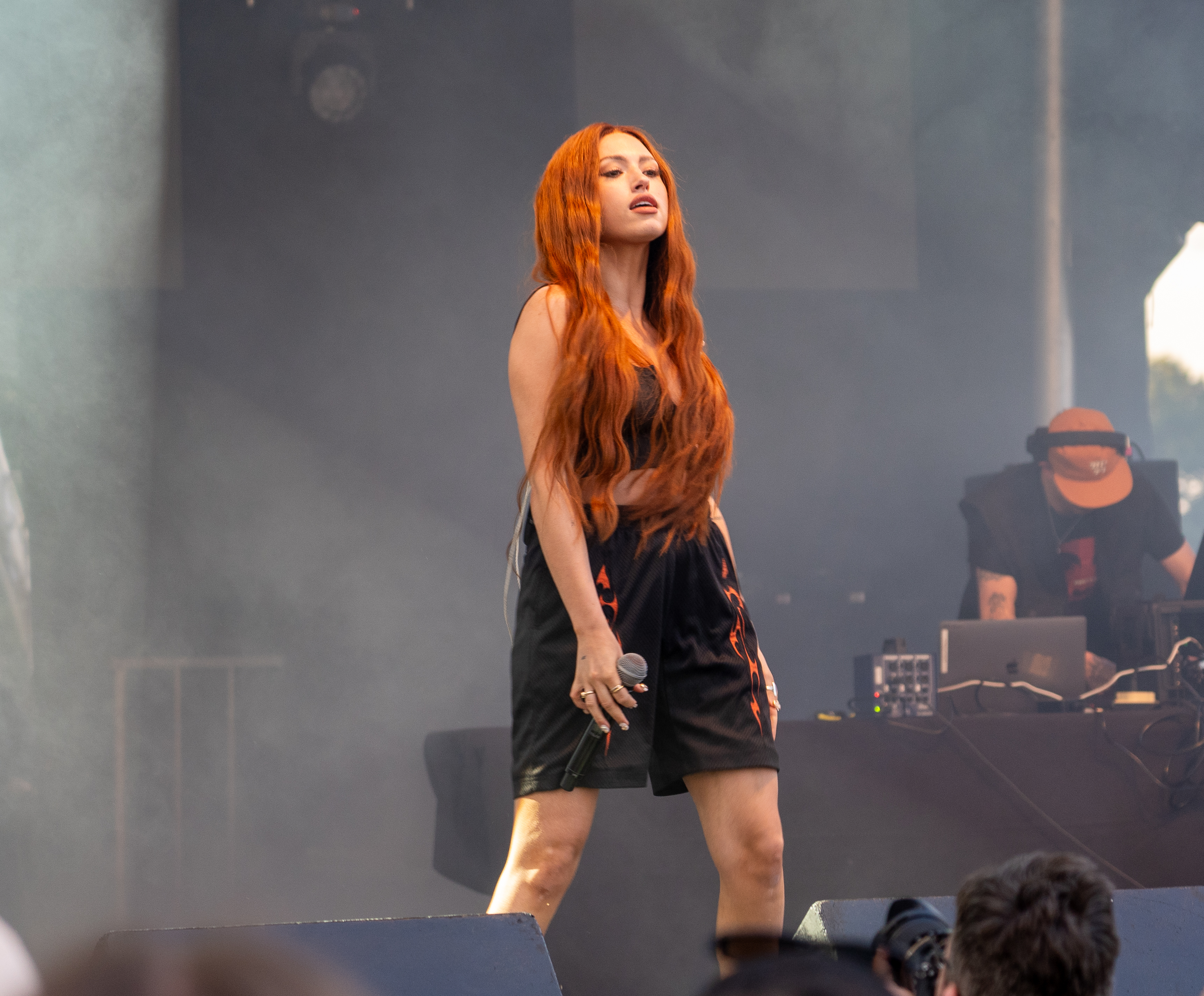
- Rêve performing in 2024

Background information
- Born: Briannah Charlie Donolo
- Origin: Montreal, Quebec, Canada
- Genres: Electronic, dance-pop
- Years active: 2021–present
- Labels: 31 East, Universal Music Canada

Briannah Charlie Donolo, known professionally as Rêve, is a Canadian singer and songwriter. She is best known for her singles "Ctrl + Alt + Del", which won the 2023 Juno Award for Dance Recording of the Year and was certified Double Platinum in Canada, and "Whitney", which topped the US Dance Airplay chart. Her debut studio album Saturn Return received a Juno nomination for Pop Album of the Year. Her second studio album, Delusions of Grandeur, is scheduled for release in 2026.

== Early life ==
Rêve was born Briannah Charlie Donolo and raised in Montreal, Quebec. She speaks both English and French. Her father is Italian. She has enjoyed music since a young age. When she was three years old, she tried matching the notes from a real piano on her Fisher-Price toy piano.

She first gained attention for singing both the American and Canadian national anthems before a Boston Bruins-Montreal Canadiens hockey game on 13 November 2014. Her performance attracted attention on social media, as it gave the American anthem a "pop sound". She was contacted by TMZ after the video of her performance earned 100,000 views on YouTube. She later sang both national anthems at a Toronto Blue Jays exhibition baseball game at Montreal Olympic Stadium in 2016, causing a similar buzz in the media.

Despite early interest from labels and managers, she chose to continue developing her sound independently. She spent nearly a decade travelling between Montreal and Toronto to record music and submit it to record labels. During this period, she worked as a wedding singer, performing at more than 600 weddings. Donolo later moved to Toronto to develop her music career, supporting herself by working as a scriptwriter for a pornography website.

== Career ==
=== 2021–2022: Major-label debut and breakthrough with "Ctrl + Alt + Del" ===
Rêve signed with Universal Music Canada and Astralwerks through Banx & Ranx's label, 31 East. Her major-label debut single, "Still Dancing", was released on June 22, 2021. Her second single, "Skin 2 Skin", followed in August 2021, built around an interpolation from the band Chicago that is also featured in the 1995 dance song "The Bomb! (These Sounds Fall into My Mind)" by The Bucketheads. Both songs later appeared on her debut EP, Layover, released February 25, 2022.

"Ctrl + Alt + Del", released on September 17, 2021 and produced by Banx & Ranx, became her breakthrough single. The song charted on the Canadian Hot 100 for 29 weeks, peaking at number 38. It was also featured in the video game FIFA 22, and was later certified Double Platinum in Canada. The song additionally topped the US TikTok Electronic chart. Her Banx & Ranx collaboration "Headphones" was released on March 25, 2022 and became her second Canadian Hot 100 entry, peaking at number 49. It was later certified Platinum in the country.

Rêve won the Dance Music Award at the 2022 SOCAN Awards for "Ctrl + Alt + Del". On June 29, 2022, she released "Tongue" as the second single from her upcoming debut album. "Whitney" was released on October 7, 2022 as the third single, and features an interpolation of Whitney Houston's 1993 cover of "I'm Every Woman". "Whitney" became her highest-charting single on the Canadian Hot 100, peaking at number 29 and spending 22 weeks on the chart. The song also topped the US Dance radio chart while peaking at number 5 on the Canadian radio chart. It was later certified Gold in the country. "Hypersexual" followed as the fourth single on December 2, 2022.

=== 2023–2024: Saturn Return ===
At the 2023 Juno Awards, Rêve was nominated for Breakthrough Artist of the Year, the Juno Fan Choice Award, and won Dance Recording of the Year for "Ctrl + Alt + Del". At the 2023 SOCAN Awards, she won the Breakthrough Award, ex-aequo with Jay Scøtt. She released "Big Boom" and "Contemporary Love" as the fifth and sixth singles from her debut album. The latter peaked at number 77 on the Canadian Hot 100 and at number 11 on the Canadian CHR/Top 40 chart. She announced her debut studio album, Saturn Return, for an October 20, 2023 release, and preceded by the promotional single "Breaking Up With Jesus".

Saturn Return was released on October 20, 2023. The 13-track album was produced largely by Banx & Ranx, with additional production from Carl Ryden, Joel Stouffer and Mike Wise. Its title refers to the astrological concept of a "saturn return", associated with a period of major life reassessment in one's late twenties. The album earned Rêve a Juno nomination for Pop Album of the Year at the 2024 Juno Awards, with producer Joel Stouffer also nominated for Producer of the Year for the tracks "Breaking Up With Jesus" and "Whitney". Elsewhere, she participated in an all-star recording of Serena Ryder's single "What I Wouldn't Do", which was released as a charity single to benefit Kids Help Phone's Feel Out Loud campaign for youth mental health.

In 2023, Rêve appeared as herself in the second season of Crave comedy series Shoresy. She also appeared as a guest judge on the fourth season of Canada's Drag Race. In November, she announced the Saturn ReTour, her first headlining tour, running through March 2024 across the Canadian cities Vancouver, Calgary, Edmonton, Winnipeg, Montreal, Toronto and Waterloo.

At the 2024 SOCAN Awards, Rêve received a Pop Music Award nomination for "Whitney". Her song "Ctrl + Alt + Del" was additionally nominated for a Dance Award at the 2024 Hollywood Independent Music Awards.

=== 2025–2026: Departure from Universal Music Canada, Delusions of Grandeur ===
Rêve released "Dancing in a Dream", a collaboration with Felix Cartal, on April 11, 2025, reaching number 97 on the Canadian Hot 100 and spending 4 non-consecutive weeks on the chart.

On May 1, 2026, she announced her sophomore studio album, Delusions of Grandeur, revealing that she had left Universal Music Canada to work as an independent artist. The lead single, "Devour", was released on June 26, 2026.

On October 27, 2026, she was announced among the participants of Canada's Choice, the Canadian national final for the Eurovision Song Contest 2027.

== Influences ==
In an interview with MTV UK, Rêve named Kaytranada, Robyn, Rüfüs du Sol, Madonna, and SG Lewis as her "ever-changing" musical influences. She has also named Tove Lo, Lady Gaga, and Whitney Houston, the latter of whom inspired her single "Whitney".

== Personal life ==
In 2022, Donolo publicly came out as bisexual with her single "Tongue."

== Discography ==
=== Studio albums ===
| Title | Album details |
|---|---|
| Saturn Return | Released: 20 October 2023; Labels: 31 East, Universal Music Canada; Format: CD, LP, digital download, streaming |
| Delusions of Grandeur | Released: 2026; Labels: Physical Presents; Format: CD, LP, digital download, streaming |

=== Extended plays ===
| Title | EP details |
|---|---|
| Layover | Released: 25 February 2022; Labels: 31 East, Universal Music Canada; Format: Digital download |

=== Singles ===
| Title | Year | Peak chart positions | | Certifications | Album |
| Title | Year | CAN | US Dance Air. | Certifications | Album |
|---|---|---|---|---|---|
| "Still Dancing" | 2021 | — | — | | Layover |
| "Skin 2 Skin" | 2021 | — | — | | Layover |
| "Ctrl + Alt + Del" | 2021 | 38 | — | MC: 2x Platinum | Layover and Saturn Return |
| "Layover" | 2022 | — | — | | Layover |
| "Headphones" (with Banx & Ranx) | 2022 | 49 | — | MC: Platinum | Non-album singles |
| "All Night & Every Day" (with Jonasu) | 2022 | — | — | | Non-album singles |
| "Tongue" | 2022 | — | — | | Saturn Return |
| "Meat" (with Comanavago) | 2022 | — | — | | Non-album single |
| "Whitney" | 2022 | 29 | 7 | MC: Gold | Saturn Return |
| "Hypersexual" | 2022 | — | — | | Saturn Return |
| "Big Boom" | 2023 | — | — | | Saturn Return |
| "Contemporary Love" | 2023 | 77 | — | | Saturn Return |
| "Breaking Up with Jesus" | 2023 | — | — | | Saturn Return |
| "Red Rover" | 2024 | — | — | | TBA |
| "Dancing in a Dream" (with Felix Cartal) | 2025 | 97 | — | | I, Sabotage |
| "Devour" | 2026 | — | — | | Delusions of Grandeur |
| "Church of Sound" | 2026 | — | — | | Delusions of Grandeur |
"—" denotes single that did not chart.

=== Appears on ===
- "Mornin'" (Rainer + Grimm with Rêve)
- "Lying Awake" (Rainer + Grimm with Rêve)
- "U&U" (Merk & Kremont feat. Rêve & Tim North)
- "Through The Night" (Robin M with Rêve)
- "Let Me Down" (Arigato Massaï feat. Rêve)
- "Light Me Up" (Adventure Club & Flight School feat. Rêve)

== Filmography ==
=== Television ===
| Year | Title | Role | Notes | Ref. |
|---|---|---|---|---|
| 2023 | Shoresy | Herself | Season 2 | |
| 2023 | Canada's Drag Race | Guest judge | Season 4, Episode 3 | |
| 2026 | Canada's Choice | Contestant | | |

== Awards and nominations ==
| Year | Award | Category | Nominee/work | Result | Ref. |
|---|---|---|---|---|---|
| 2022 | SOCAN Awards | Dance Music Award | "Ctrl + Alt + Del" | Won | |
| 2023 | SOCAN Awards | Breakthrough Award | Rêve | Won | |
| 2024 | SOCAN Awards | Pop Music Award | "Whitney" | Nominated | |
| 2023 | Juno Awards | Breakthrough Artist of the Year | Rêve | Nominated | |
| 2023 | Juno Awards | Fan Choice | Rêve | Nominated | |
| 2023 | Juno Awards | Dance Recording of the Year | "Ctrl + Alt + Del" | Won | |
| 2024 | Juno Awards | Pop Album of the Year | Saturn Return | Nominated | |
| 2024 | Hollywood Independent Music Awards | Dance Award | "Ctrl + Alt + Del" | Nominated | |
| 2026 | SOCAN Awards | Dance Music Award | "Dancing In A Dream"(with Felix Cartal) | Won | |
