= Moonrise (festival) =

Electronic dance music festival in Baltimore, Maryland

Moonrise Festival
- Genre: Dubstep; progressive house; electro house
- Dates: August
- Location: Baltimore, Maryland
- Years active: 2014–present
- Founders: Insomniac; Club Glow
- Organizer: Steez Promo; Club Glow; Insomniac
- Website: www.moonrisefestival.com

Moonrise Festival is an annual electronic dance music (EDM) festival held in Baltimore, Maryland.

== History ==
In 2013, the festival was scheduled to be held on June 8 and 9 in Port Covington. However, the festival was cancelled due to event organizers failing to get the necessary city permits. In 2014, the festival was held at Pimlico Race Course and was considered an outstanding success with over 30,000 in attendance. The 2015 and 2016 festival were held at the same location on August 8–9, and 6-7 respectively with headliners such as Bassnectar, The Chainsmokers, Zedd, and Tiësto. The 2017 festival returned to Pimlico on August 12–13 with headliners Zeds Dead, Pretty Lights, Carnage, and Dillstradamus. The 2018 edition of the festival took place on August 11–12 with the headliners list including the likes of Marshmello, Diplo, and Cashmere Cat. The festival returned to the same location on August 10–11, 2019, headlined by Illenium, Excision, and Tiësto.

=== 2020 COVID-19 Breakout ===
In 2020, Moonrise announced a move to a 3-day festival. But the COVID-19 pandemic ended up canceling both the 2020 and 2021 occurrences.

=== Return of Moonrise Festival ===
On Aug 6–7, 2022, Moonrise returned with headliners including Tiesto, Zedd, and Rezz. Moonrise announced a returned to Pimlico again in 2022 with no mention of an extension to 3 days as originally planned for 2020. This would be the first iteration of the festival since the Club Glow had been brought under the Insomniac parent company. Moonrise 2023 has been announced to return to Pimlico again Aug 12–13, 2023. VIP tier 1 ticket prices increased $50, to $275 per person vs Project Glow in DC April 29–30 or the 2022 edition of Moonrise.

== See also ==
- List of electronic music festivals
