= List of Canadian hip-hop musicians =

This is a list of hip hop musicians from Canada.

== Bands & collectives ==
Canadian hip-hop acts with more than one member: duos, crews and collectives all go here, arranged alphabetically by first name/initial.

=== 0–9 ===
- 100 MAD
- The 20/20 Project
- 88Glam

=== A ===
- A-Game
- Alaclair Ensemble
- ALAIZ collective
- Aquakultre
- Atach Tatuq

=== B ===
- Baby Blue Soundcrew
- Babylon Warchild
- Backburner
- BadBadNotGood
- BAE aka (Be All Equal)
- Bakers Club
- Baracuda
- Bass is Base
- Big Black Lincoln
- Birth Through Knowledge
- Bobby Demo
- Boombox Saints
- BrassMunk
- Brown Boys
- Buck 65
- Buck N' Nice
- Burd & Keyz
- Busty and the Bass

=== C ===
- Cartel Madras
- The Celestics
- The Chicharones
- Chosen One
- Circle Crew
- Citizen Kane
- Common Grackle
- Conjure One
- Criollo

=== D ===
- Da Grassroots
- Da Gryptions
- Dance Appeal
- Dead Can't Bounce
- Dead Celebrity Status
- The Dead Indians
- Dead Obies
- Dirty Circus
- The Dope Poet Society
- Down with Webster
- Drake
- Dragon Fli Empire
- Dream Warriors
- Dubmatique

=== E ===
- Empty Handed Warriors

=== F ===
- Farm Fresh
- Feuilles et Racines
- Figurez of Speech
- First Words
- Flight Distance
- Freaks of Reality
- Freedom Writers
- Full Circle

=== G ===
- G5 Canadian Urban
- Gatineau
- Gazeebow Unit
- Get Loose Crew
- Ghetto Concept
- Gilla House
- Goliath Paw
- Grand Analog

=== H ===
- Halal Gang
- The Halluci Nation
- Headstrong
- Hip Club Groove

=== I ===
- IRS
- IXXI Initiative

=== J ===
- Just John x Dom Dias

=== K ===
- Kyle Spratt

KILLY

- Khali1k

=== L ===
- Len
- LMDS
- Loco Locass
- Lyrical Assault

=== M ===
- Main Source
- The Masterplan
- The Maximum Definitive
- MCJ and Cool G
- MC Shadow
- Messenjah (part of Dance Appeal)
- Metropolis
- Mine de rien
- Monolith Crew
- Mood Ruff
- Muzion

=== N ===
- Naturally Born Strangers
- The New Royales
- Nomadic Massive

=== O ===
- The Oddities
- OK Cobra
- Omnikrom
- Organized Rhyme

=== P ===
- Paranoid Castle
- Perfeck Strangers
- Pigeon Hole
- Plague Language
- Planet Giza
- The Pocket Dwellers
- Point Blank
- Poor Man Militia
- The Posterz
- Prime Boys
- Project Wyze

=== R ===
- Radio Radio
- Raggadeath
- Rascalz
- Rezofficial
- Rime Organisé
- Rumble & Strong
- Run-Up

=== S ===
- Sans Pression
- Scales Empire
- Sebutones
- Self Taught
- Serial Joe
- Shades of Culture
- Simply Majestic
- Singing Fools
- Slangblossom
- Smash Brovaz
- Snotty Nose Rez Kids
- So Loki
- Social Deviantz
- The Sorority
- Split Personality
- StarBwoyz
- Stompdown Killaz (SDK)
- Super Duty Tough Work
- Swamp Thing
- Sweatshop Union
- Swollen Members

=== T ===
- TBTBT
- Team Rezofficial
- Thunderheist
- TNGHT
- Tizzy Gang
- Treizième Étage
- Tone Mason
- Toolshed
- Touch and Nato
- TRP.P
- Tru-Paz
- The Twin Sisters

=== U ===
Unity Productions Crew

=== V ===
- Vice Verset
- Villain Accelerate
- Voyage Funktastique

=== W ===
- War Party
- Warsawpack
- Winnipeg's Most
- Women Ah Run Tings

=== X ===
- X-Quisite

== Beatboxers ==
Canadian hip-hop musicians who beatbox go here, arranged by first name/initial.

=== C ===
- CRi
- Corey Vidal

=== K ===
- krNfx

=== P ===
- Poizunus

== Breakdancers & hip hop dancers ==
Canadian hip-hop breakdancers (aka breaking) & Hip hop dancers, as well as hip-hop acts with more than one member: duos, crews and collectives, go here.

B-Boys & B-Girls were an integral part of Hip-hop crews – often hyping up the crowd, vocally backing up the DJ, etc.

Arranged by first name/initial.

=== A ===
- Anton See

=== B ===
- Bboy Fléau
- Bag Of Trix
- Boogie Brats Crew

=== D ===
- Dedos
- DKC Freeze
- Do Dat Dancers

=== F ===
- The FreshFactory aka Simply Swagg Dance Studio

=== J ===
- Jade's Hip Hop Academy aka (JHHA)

=== K ===
- K-mel

=== L ===
- Laurieann Gibson

=== M ===
- Mathematik

=== N ===
- Now or Never aka N.O.N. crew

=== O ===
- ÖR PÜR

=== P ===
- Phil Wizard
- Prada-G
- Performance Company

=== R ===
- Rebels De La Soul

=== S ===
- SaMel Tanz
- Shawn Desman
- Sweet Technique

=== U ===
- Unkle Adams

=== V ===
- Vic Versa

=== Z ===
- Zebroc

== Choreographers of breaking/hip-hop dance ==
Canadian hip-hop choreographers of breakdancers (aka breaking) & Hip hop dancers, go here.

B-Boys & B-Girls were an integral part of Hip-hop crews – often hyping up the crowd, vocally backing up the DJ, etc.

=== L ===
- Laurieann Gibson
- Luther Brown

=== S ===
- Shawn Desman

=== T ===
- Tanisha Scsuck myott

== Composers ==
Canadian hip-hop composers go here, arranged by first name/initial.

=== E ===
- Esthero

=== K ===
- The KOUNT
- Koushik

=== M ===
- Mocky

=== S ===
- Shan Vincent de Paul

== DJs ==
Canadian hip-hop DJs go here, arranged by first name/initial (after DJ).

=== 0–9 ===
- 4th Pyramid

=== A ===
- A-Trak
- Agile

=== B ===
- Beetle Jiggly
- Beetle Juice
- DJ Benoît

=== C ===
- C-Boogie
- DJ Charlie B
- DJ Cosm
- DJ Critical

=== D ===
- Dave "Diggy" Ferris
- Dee
- Def3
- Dr. MaD

=== E ===
- Excision

=== F ===
- Frank Dukes

=== G ===
- DJ G-Starr
- Ghislain Poirier
- Ghost Style
- DJ Grouch
- DJ Grumps

=== H ===
- Nick Holder

=== I ===
- Infinite

=== J ===
- Jam on Strong
- Jairus Sharif
- Junia-T

=== K ===
- Kardinal Offishall
- Kaytranada
- K-Cut
- DJ Kemo
- KLC
- Kid Koala

=== L ===
- DJ Law
- Lunice

=== M ===
- DJ Mel Boogie
- More or Les
- Muneshine
- Murda Beatz

=== N ===
- Nato
- Ron Nelson

=== O ===
- Octave Minds

=== P ===
- DJ Power (of The Masterplan)

=== R ===
- Rich Terfry

=== S ===
- Singlefoot
- Singleton
- Sixtoo
- Skratch Bastid
- Snow
- Swiff

=== W ===
- Walla-P
- DJ Whitesox (of Pôle Hip-Hop radio show [fr])

=== X ===
- DJX

=== Z ===
- Zeds Dead

== Instrumentalists ==
Canadian hip-hop Instrumentalists, multi-instrumentalists & music programmers; This includes Canadian beatmakers, who do not participate in full production or DJing/turntablism – just beat creation using synthesizers, sound modulation or samplers like MPC2000, the Roland SP-404, the Akai MPC or other brands of music sequencers; go here, arranged by first name/initial (after DJ).

=== A ===
- Andrew Huang

=== B ===
- Blue Sky Black Death
- Boogat
- Bryden Gwiss Kiwenzie
- Buck 65

=== C ===
- Checkmate
- Chester Hansen
- CHIN

=== D ===
- Da Grassroots
- Daniel Caesar
- Dee

=== E ===
- Eestbound
- Elaquent
- Étienne
- Excision

=== F ===
- Factor Chandelier
- Fresh Kils

=== G ===
- Ghost Style

=== I ===
- Ivana Santilli

=== J ===
- Jairus Sharif
- Jordan Evans

=== K ===
- k-os
- Karl Wolf
- DJ Kemo
- KO
- The KOUNT
- Koushik
- krNfx
- Kytami

=== M ===
- Margeaux
- Massari
- Matthew Burnett
- Merlin Bronques
- Mocky
- Moka Only
- Muneshine

=== N ===
- Nineteen85

=== O ===
- Octave Minds

=== P ===
- Peaches

=== R ===
- Rich Kidd Beats
- Rich Terfry
- Rob Johnson
- RumpleStiltz (cello)

=== S ===
- Shan Vincent de Paul
- Sharon Costanzo
- Shay Lia
- Sixtoo
- Stigg of the Dump

=== T ===
- TOUGH DUMPLIN'

=== Y ===
- Yanchan Produced

== Lyricists / songwriters ==
Canadian hip-hop musicians who are lyricists and songwriters go here, arranged by first name/initial.

=== 0–9 ===
- 4th Pyramid
- 40
- 88Camino

=== A ===
- Ale Dee
- Allstar
- AP Dhillon
- AR Paisley
- Aspektz

=== B ===
- B-Kool
- Baëbe Ruth
- Baka Not Nice
- bbno$
- Belly
- Big Lean
- Boi-1da

=== C ===
- Cadence Weapon
- Camm Hunter
- DJ Charlie B
- Chester Hansen
- Chilly Gonzales
- CHIN
- Chuckie Akenz
- Classified
- cobna

=== D ===
- Daniel Caesar
- DAX
- Dee
- Deborah Cox
- Drake
- Drezus
- Dru

=== E ===
- Esthero
- Eternia

=== F ===
- Fateh Doe
- Frank Dukes

=== G ===
- Glen Lewis
- grandson
- Graph Nobel
- Gurinder Gill

=== H ===
- Honey Cocaine
- Houdini

=== I ===
- Imposs
- ishQ

=== J ===
- Jay Whiss
- Jazzy B
- Jazz Cartier
- JD Era
- Jeff Spec
- Jon Lajoie
- Jonathan Emile
- Jordan Evans
- Jully Black

=== K ===
- K'naan
- K'Maro
- k-os
- Karan Aujla
- Kardinal Offishall
- Karl Wolf
- Kaytranada
- Keysha Freshh
- KILLY
- KO
- Kwajo Cinqo

=== L ===
- Lillian Allen
- Lil Pappie
- Loud
- Lyldoll

=== M ===
- mcenroe
- Maestro Fresh Wes
- Madchild
- Manafest
- Marc Costanzo
- Mark
- Margeaux
- Massari
- Mathematik
- Melanie Fiona
- Michie Mee
- Miles Jones
- Mocky
- Moka Only
- Murda Beatz
- Mustafa the Poet

=== N ===
- Nav
- Night Lovell
- Nineteen85

=== P ===
- PartyNextDoor
- Powfu
- Preme
- Prevail
- Pressa
- Promise
- Pvrx

=== R ===
- RationaL
- Reema Major
- Roy Wood$

=== S ===
- SAFE
- Sean Leon
- Sevn Thomas
- Shan Vincent de Paul
- Shawn Desman
- Shinda Kahlon
- Sir Pathétik
- Sixtoo
- Smiley
- Smoke Dawg
- Snow
- Solitair
- SonReal
- Sunny Malton

=== T ===
- T-Minus
- Tariq
- Thrust
- ThxSoMch
- TOBi
- Tona
- Tory Lanez

=== W ===
- Wondagurl
- Wise

=== Y ===
- Yanchan Produced
- Yung Tory

== Producers ==
Canadian hip-hop producers, record producers or mixing engineers go here, arranged by first name/initial (after DJ).

=== 0–9 ===
- 2Rude
- 4th Pyramid
- 40

=== A ===
- Agile
- Alex Greggs
- Allan Kingdom
- Allstar
- Andrew Huang
- AP Dhillon
- Aspektz

=== B ===
- B-Kool
- Backxwash
- Belly
- Bender
- Big Kish
- Blue Sky Black Death
- Boi-1da
- Boogat
- Bryden Gwiss Kiwenzie
- Buck 65

=== C ===
- Cadence Weapon
- Cast (TE)
- DJ Charlie B
- Checkmate
- Chester Hansen
- Chilly Gonzales
- CHIN
- Classified
- DJ Cosm
- Courtney "Pikihed" Rowe

=== D ===
- Da Grassroots
- Darryl Riley
- DAX
- Dee
- Deborah Cox
- DL Incognito
- Don Cash
- Dru

=== E ===
- Eestbound
- Elaquent
- Emay
- Esthero
- Étienne
- Excision

=== F ===
- Factor Chandelier
- Fateh Doe
- Frank Dukes
- Frankenstein
- Fresh Kils

=== G ===
- Ghettosocks
- Ghost Style
- Gminxr
- Gregory Pepper

=== H ===
- Hyper-T

=== I ===
- ishQ

=== J ===
- Jacky Jasper
- Jairus Sharif
- JDiggz
- Jeff Spec
- Jon Lajoie
- Jonathan Emile
- Jordan Evans

=== K ===
- K-Cut
- K'naan
- k-os
- Kardinal Offishall
- Karl Wolf
- Kaytranada
- Keysha Freshh
- The KOUNT
- Koushik
- Kwajo Cinqo

=== L ===
- Langdon Auger
- Lunice
- Lou Phelps

=== M ===
- Marc Costanzo
- Marco Polo
- Mark Morley
- Matthew Burnett
- Melanie Fiona
- Merlin Bronques
- Mike Shabb
- Mikhail
- Miles Jones
- Mocky
- Moka Only
- More or Les
- MoSS
- Mr. Attic
- Muneshine
- Murda Beatz

=== N ===
- Nato
- Nav
- Nicholas Craven
- Night Lovell
- Nineteen85

=== O ===
- Octave Minds
- Orphan

=== P ===
- PartyNextDoor
- Peaches
- Pops
- Powfu
- Preme
- President Jeff

=== R ===
- Raz Fresco
- Rich Kidd
- Rich Terfry
- Ryan Hemsworth

=== S ===
- Saukrates
- Sean Leon
- Sevn Thomas
- Shawn Desman
- Singlefoot
- Singleton
- Sixtoo
- Socalled
- Sol Guy
- Solitair
- StarBwoyz
- Stigg of the Dump

=== T ===
- T.R.A.C.K.S.
- T-Minus
- Teekay
- Tona
- Tory Lanez
- Tre Mission

=== W ===
- Walla-P
- William J. Bruce III
- WondaGurl

=== X ===
- DJX

=== Y ===
YoEmmett

=== Z ===
- Zeds Dead

== Rappers / emcees ==
Canadian hip-hop musicians who are Hype men / Hype Women; or that can rap / emcee go here, arranged by first name/initial.

=== 0–9 ===
- 2Saï
- 347aidan
- 4th Pyramid
- The 6th Letter
- 88Camino

=== A ===
- Abdominal
- Akintoye

AK-SLIM

- Ale Dee
- Allan Kingdom
- Allstar
- Anodajay
- AP Dhillon
- AR Paisley
- Arabesque
- Asante Haughton
- Aspektz
- Asuquomo

=== B ===
- B-Kool
- Baba Brinkman
- Backxwash
- Bad News Brown
- Baka Not Nice
- Baracuda
- Bbno$
- Belly
- Bender
- Besque
- Big Kish
- Big Lean
- Birdapres
- Bishop Brigante
- Rob "Blye" Paris
- Bobby McIntosh
- Boogat
- Boslen
- Briz Brown
- Buck 65

=== C ===
- Cadence Weapon
- Cale Sampson
- Camm Hunter
- Capital Q
- C Greezy
- Charmaine
- Cobna
- Chek Love
- Checkmate
- Chilly Gonzales
- Choclair
- Choke
- Chokeules
- Chris Yonge
- Chuckie Akenz
- Clairmont the Second
- Classified
- Cody Ko
- Cory Bowles
- CRUNK23
- Crystle Lightning
- Culture

=== D ===
- D-Sisive
- D.O.
- DaHoudini
- Dan-e-o
- Daniel Kelly
- Darryl Riley
- DAX
- Dead Hendrix
- Dedos
- Def3
- Deph Naught
- Devon
- DijahSB
- DillanPonders
- DJ Charlie B
- DL Incognito
- Dolo
- Don Cash
- Donnie
- Downey
- Drake
- Dramatik
- Drezus
- DTG
- DY

=== E ===
- Eekwol
- EIGHTYEIGHTWAV
- Emay
- Enima
- Eric Reprid
- Eternia

=== F ===
- Famous
- Fateh Doe
- FouKi
- Frankenstein
- Freddy Will
- Fresco P
- Freshbread
- Fresh I.E.
- Friyie

=== G ===
- Gettomasa
- Ghettosocks
- Ghost Style
- Goody Grace
- grandson
- Graph Nobel
- Gregory Pepper
- Gurinder Gill

=== H ===
- H-Bomb
- Haviah Mighty
- HDV
- Honey C
- Honey Cocaine
- Horse Thief
- Houdini
- Hyper-T

=== I ===
- Ian Kamau
- Imperial
- Imposs
- Infinite
- ishQ

=== J ===
- J-Kyll
- Jeff "J-Spade" Duke
- Jackal
- Jacky Jasper
- Jay Whiss
- Jazz Cartier
- JB
- JB the First Lady
- JD Era
- JDiggz
- Jeff Spec
- Jelleestone
- Jesse Dangerously
- Jimmy Prime
- Joey Stylez
- John River
- Jon Lajoie
- Jon E
- Jonathan Emile
- Josh Martinez
- JRDN
- Junia-T

=== K ===
- K-4ce
- K-os
- K'Maro
- K'naan
- K. Olafemi
- Karan Aujla
- Kardi (of Figurez of Speech)
- Kardinal Offishall
- Kay the Aquanaut
- Kaytranada
- Keysha Freshh
- Kidd
- Kid Kut
- Kid Twist
- KILLY
- King Reign
- King Lou
- Kingston
- Kinnie Starr
- Koriass
- Korey "Korey Deez" Downey
- Kris the $pirit
- Kris Wu
- Krosst Out
- Kwajo
- Kyprios
- Kytami

=== L ===
- Langdon Auger
- Legitimate
- Lex Leosis
- Lil Berete
- Lil Pappie
- Lil Windex
- Livestock
- Lord Kemy
- Lou Phelps
- Loud
- Lostboy Carlos

=== M ===
- Madchild
- Maestro Fresh Wes
- Manafest
- Mark
- Mark Shrubsole
- MarKeese ArTiste
- Marvel (of Figurez of Speech & Circle Crew)
- Marvel Mike
- Manu Militari
- Masia One
- Massari
- Mathematik
- Maui Slim
- mcenroe
- MC Mystic
- Merlin Bronques
- Michie Mee
- Mike Shabb
- Mindbender Supreme
- Mischa
- Mikey Dankz
- Miles Jones
- Misfit
- MLMA
- Modulok
- Moka Only
- More or Les
- Motion
- Mr. Metro
- Mr Thoro
- Mr. Q
- Mr. Roam
- Mr. Yaw Yaw
- Muneshine
- Merkules

=== N ===
- Narcy
- Nate Husser
- Nav
- Naya Ali
- Naval Avatar
- Night Lovell
- Noah23
- NorthSideBenji
- Nova Rockafeller

=== O ===
- Odario Williams
- Ontario Banderas
- Organik
- Orphan
- Ollie
- Official YellowBunny

=== P ===
- P Reign
- PartyNextDoor
- Peaches
- pHoenix Pagliacci
- Pierre Kwenders
- Pip Skid
- Powfu
- Preme
- Pressa
- Prevail
- Professor D
- Promise
- Puffy L'z
- Pvrx

=== R ===
- RationaL
- Raz Fresco
- Red1
- Reema Major
- Rel McCoy
- Rich Kidd
- Rich London
- Rich Terfry
- Ricky J
- Roi Heenok
- Roger Mooking
- Roy Wood$
- RPD
- Rumble
- Rumplestiltz

=== S ===
- SAFE
- Samian
- Sans Pression
- Sarahmée
- Saukrates (of Figurez of Speech)
- Scotch Butta
- Sean Leon
- Shad
- Shan Vincent de Paul
- Shinda Kahlon
- Shubh
- Sean Leon
- Sébastien Ricard
- Sif
- Sidhu Moosewala
- Sir Pathétik
- Sixtoo
- Skiifall
- Smiley
- Smoke Dawg
- Snak the Ripper
- Snow
- Socalled
- Sol Guy
- Solitair (of Figurez of Speech)
- SonReal
- Souldia
- Sourav Deb
- Spek
- Spek Won
- Split Personality
- Stuart Stone
- Stump
- Sunny Malton
- Sydanie

=== T ===
- Tablo
- Tank Gawd
- Tasha the Amazon
- TassNata
- Teekay
- ThxSoMch
- Thrust
- Timbuktu
- Tizzo
- Tobi
- Tona
- Tom Green
- Tommy Genesis
- Tom MacDonald
- Tory Lanez
- Touch
- TOUGH DUMPLIN'
- Transit
- Tre Mission
- Trouble
- Troy Neilson

=== U ===
- The Ghost Of Mizery
- Unkle Adams
- Unknown Mizery

=== V ===
- Vaï
- VERSE
- Von Von le Vet

=== W ===
- Wab Kinew
- Wali Shah
- Webster
- The Weeknd
- Wendy Motion Brathwaite
- Wio-K
- Wise
- Wordburglar

=== Y ===
- Yas Taalat
- YLook
- Young Kidd
- Yung Tory
- Yvon Krevé

=== Z ===
- Zebroc
- Zarvex

== Singers ==
Canadian hip-hop musicians who are singers or a Hype man/ Hype Woman go here, arranged by first name/initial.

=== 0–9 ===
- 347aidan
- The 6th Letter
- 88Camino

=== A ===
- Ale Dee
- Alyssa Reid
- Andreena Mill
- Anodajay
- AP Dhillon
- Aspektz
- Asuquomo

=== B ===
- Bad News Brown
- Baëbe Ruth
- bbno$
- Belly
- Bender
- Big Lean
- Black Atlass
- Boogat
- Bryden Gwiss Kiwenzie

=== C ===
- Camm Hunter
- Chilly Gonzales
- CHIN
- Culture

=== D ===
- Daniel Caesar
- DAX
- Dead Hendrix
- Deborah Cox
- DillanPonders
- Drake
- Dru

=== E ===
- Eekwol
- Empire I
- Eria Fachin
- Esthero

=== F ===
- Fateh Doe
- Friyie

=== G ===
- Glen Lewis
- grandson
- Graph Nobel
- Gregory Pepper
- Gurinder Gill

=== H ===
- Haviah Mighty
- Honey Cocaine
- Houdini

=== I ===
- Imposs
- iSH
- Ishan Morris
- ishQ

=== J ===
- JAHKOY
- Jay Whiss
- Jazzy B
- Jazz Cartier
- Jememi
- Jillian Menedez (part of Dance Appeal)
- Jon Lajoie
- Josh Martinez
- JRDN
- Jully Black

=== K ===
- K'naan
- K'Maro
- k-os
- Karan Aujla
- Karl Wolf
- KILLY
- Kinnie Starr
- KO
- Kris Wu
- krNfx
- Kytami

=== L ===
- Laurieann Gibson
- Lillian Allen
- Lil Pappie
- Lorraine Scott (of Dance Appeal)
- Lyldoll

=== M ===
- Maestro Fresh Wes
- Manafest
- Margeaux
- Marc Costanzo
- Margeaux
- Mark
- Masia One
- Massari
- Melanie Fiona
- Miles Jones
- Mocky
- Moka Only
- Mustafa the Poet

=== N ===
- Nav
- Nelly Furtado

=== P ===
- PartyNextDoor
- Peaches
- Pierre Kwenders
- Powfu
- Preme
- Pressa
- Promise
- Puffy L'z
- Pvrx

=== R ===
- Raz Fresco
- Rob Johnson
- Roy Wood$

=== S ===
- SAFE
- Saukrates
- Sean Leon
- Sevn Thomas
- Shan Vincent de Paul
- Sharon Costanzo
- Shawn Desman
- Shay Lia
- Shinda Kahlon
- Sir Pathétik
- Smoke Dawg
- Snow
- SonReal
- Suga Prince
- Sunny Malton

=== T ===
- Thando Hyman
- Tamia
- Tariq
- ThxSoMch
- TOBi
- Tommy Genesis
- Tory Lanez
- Tate McRae

=== V ===
- Vaï

=== W ===
- The Weeknd
- Wise

=== X ===
- XSDTRK

=== Y ===
- Yanchan Produced
- Yvon Krevé

== Singing groups ==
Canadian hip-hop singing acts with more than one member: duos, crews and collectives all go here, arranged alphabetically by first name/initial.

=== B ===
- Big Black Lincoln
- Bass is Base

== See also ==
- Canadian hip hop
- Music of Canada
