= Dufferin Grove =

- Neighbourhood
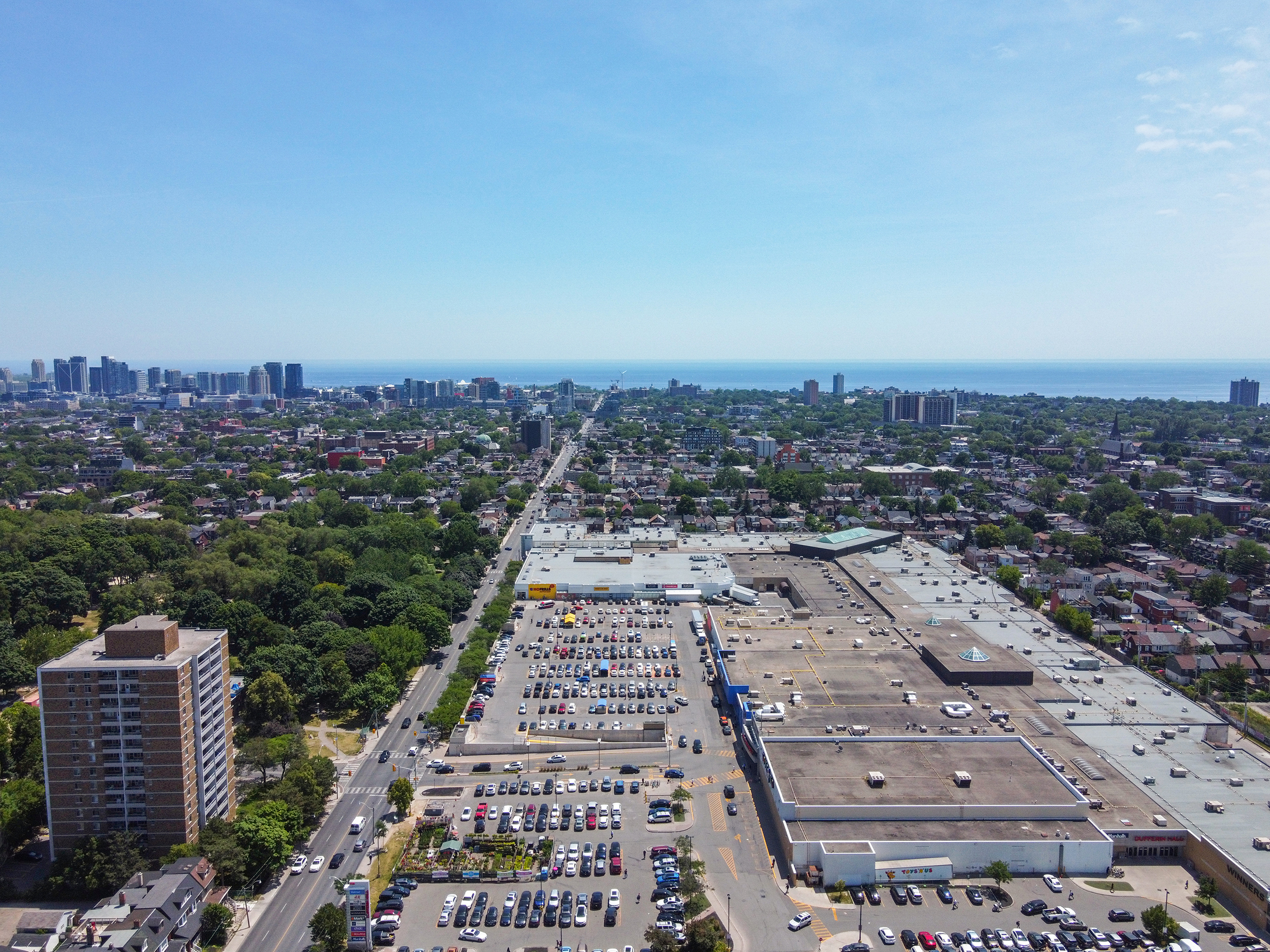
- Aerial view of Dufferin Grove in 2022

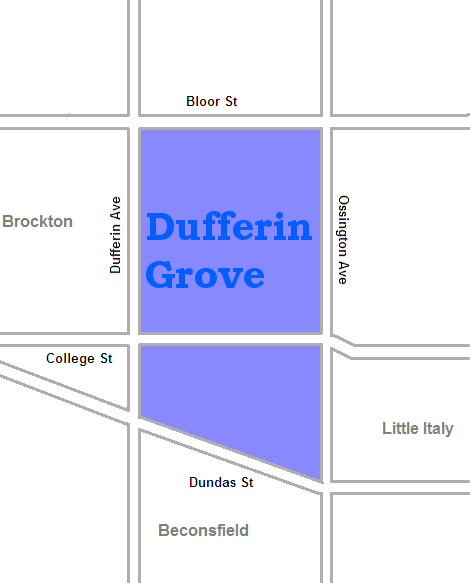
- Neighbourhood map

- Location within Toronto
- Coordinates: 43.657°N 79.428°W
- Country: Canada
- Province: Ontario
- City: Toronto

Government
  - City Councillor: Alejandra Bravo (Ward 9); Dianne Saxe (Ward 11)
  - Federal M.P.: Julie Dzerowicz (Davenport)
  - Provincial M.P.P.: Marit Stiles (Davenport)

Dufferin Grove is a neighbourhood located in Toronto, Ontario, Canada, west of downtown. The neighbourhood is bordered by Bloor Street West to the north, Ossington Ave to the east, College Street to the south, and Dufferin Street to the west.

== Character ==
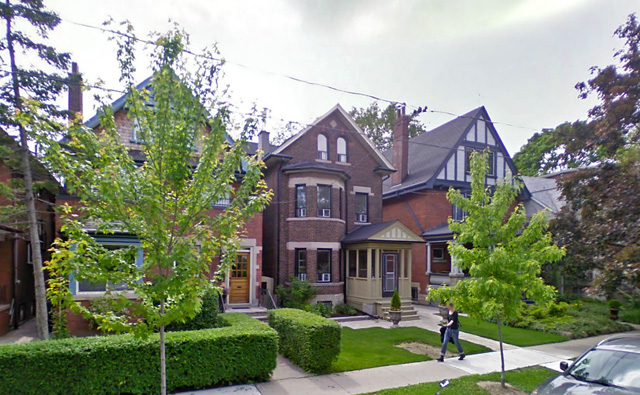
House in Dufferin Park were predominantly built between 1890 and 1930, with architectural styles ranging from late-Victorian to Edwardian.

The neighbourhood is very green, with many trees and some of the largest gardens and yards in Toronto, and it has a very active nightlife, with many "hip" and urban restaurants scattered along Bloor and College. There are also many small independent specialty shops like bakeries, smoothie shops, and bike stores. The main streets of the neighbourhood are Bloor, College and Dufferin Streets. Dufferin, a four-lane arterial, is mostly residential with the exception of the Dufferin Mall on the west side south of Bloor. College Street is a four-lane arterial road, with a mix of commercial storefronts and residences.

The neighbourhood is predominantly two or three-storey detached or semi-detached homes at a medium density. The majority of Dufferin Grove houses were built between 1890 and 1930. Dufferin Grove's semi-detached and detached houses are larger than those found in most downtown Toronto neighbourhoods. The architectural style of the homes in Dufferin Grove ranges from early and late Victorian to Edwardian and English Cottage style designs. Dufferin Grove is a popular family-oriented neighbourhood due to the size of the houses and the amenities, including a popular community park, a shopping centre, schools and access to public transit.

Dufferin Grove is home to two elementary public schools, Ossington Old Orchard Public School and Dewson Street Junior Public School.

== History ==
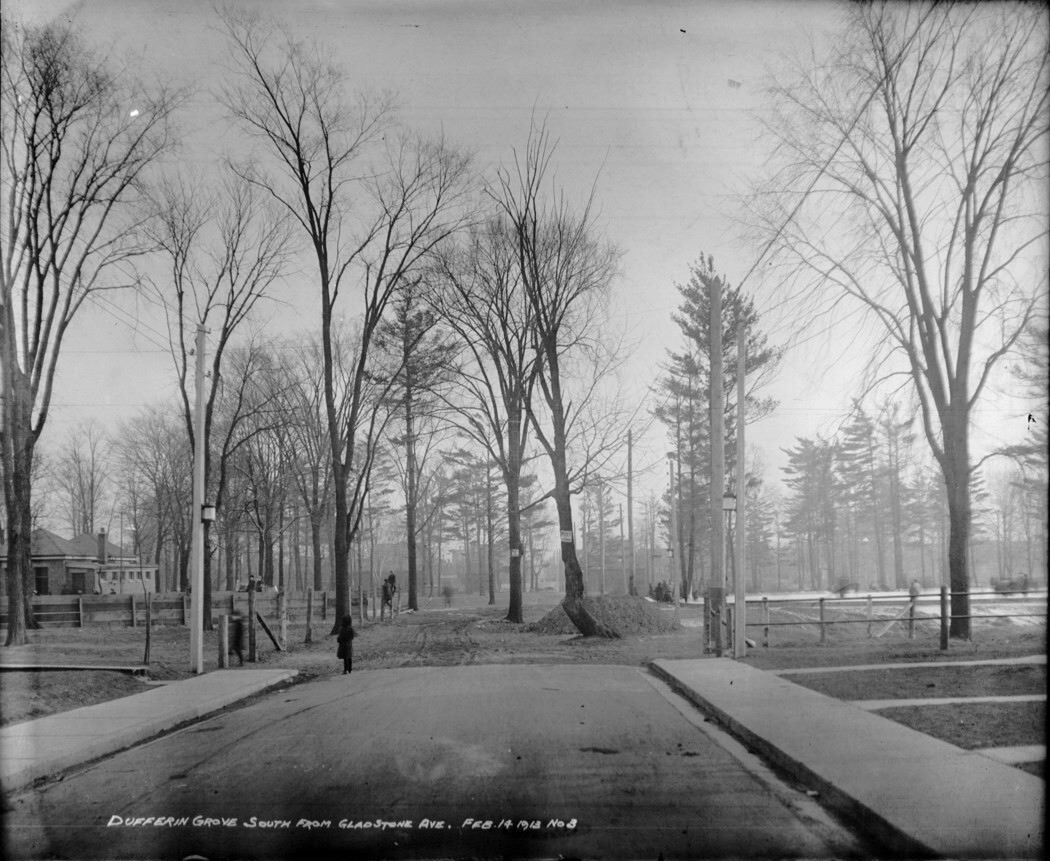
Dufferin Grove looking south from Havelock Avenue, 1913.

The Dufferin Grove district was first settled by the Denison Family, who emigrated to Canada from England in 1792. The Denisons were active participants in Toronto's early military and political affairs. Their country villas were Toronto landmarks, that had titles such as "Dover Court", "Rush Holme", and "Heydon Villa". In 1834, with the city encroaching at their doorstep, the Denisons decided to clear the dense forest covering their property, and began cultivating this land. The fertile soil in the area yielded abundant crops and brought the Denisons great wealth. However, by the 1880s, the value of the Denison estates lay in housing development, not agriculture. Thus rows of crops were gradually replaced by rows of houses and the current neighbourhood was developed.

== Demographics ==
In the west (and to an extent east) end of the neighbourhood there is a large population of Portuguese, spreading out from Little Portugal located to the south-west.

The area has a larger than average population (compared to the rest of Toronto) in the age groups between 25–39, according to 2006 census data.

== Education ==
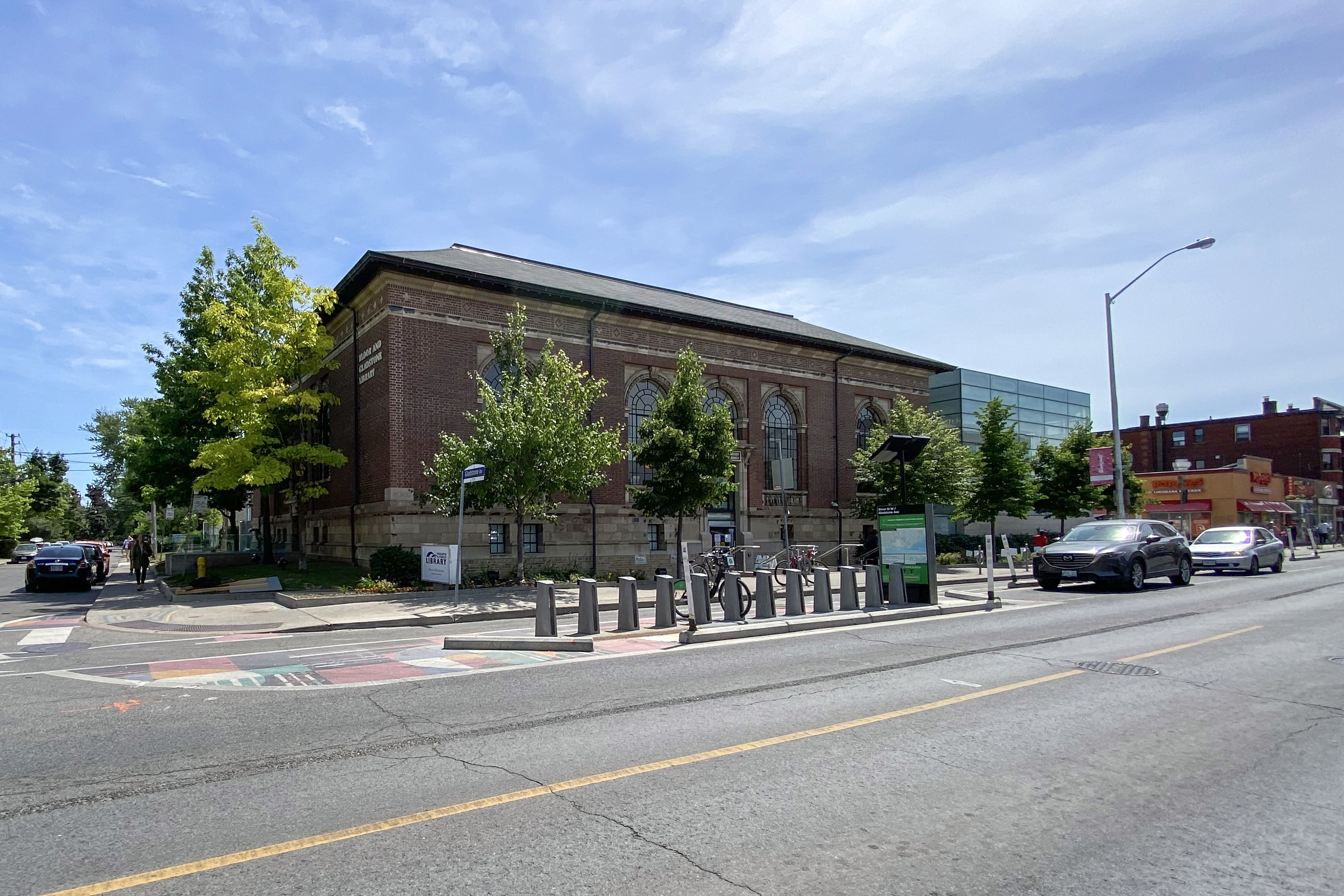
Bloor/Gladstone Library

Four public school boards operate in Brockton Village, Conseil scolaire catholique MonAvenir (CSCM), Conseil scolaire Viamonde (CSV), the Toronto Catholic District School Board (TCDSB), and the Toronto District School Board (TDSB).

TDSB is a secular public school board that operates two elementary schools, Dewson Street Junior Public School and Ossington/Old Orchard Junior Public School, with both formerly operated by the Toronto Board of Education. TCDSB is a separate public school board that operates one secondary school in the neighbourhood, St. Mary Catholic Academy although the building was formerly known as an elementary school, J. J. McGrand Catholic School and later became the southern campus of Brother Edmund Rice Catholic Secondary School.
