= St. Mary Catholic Academy (Toronto) =

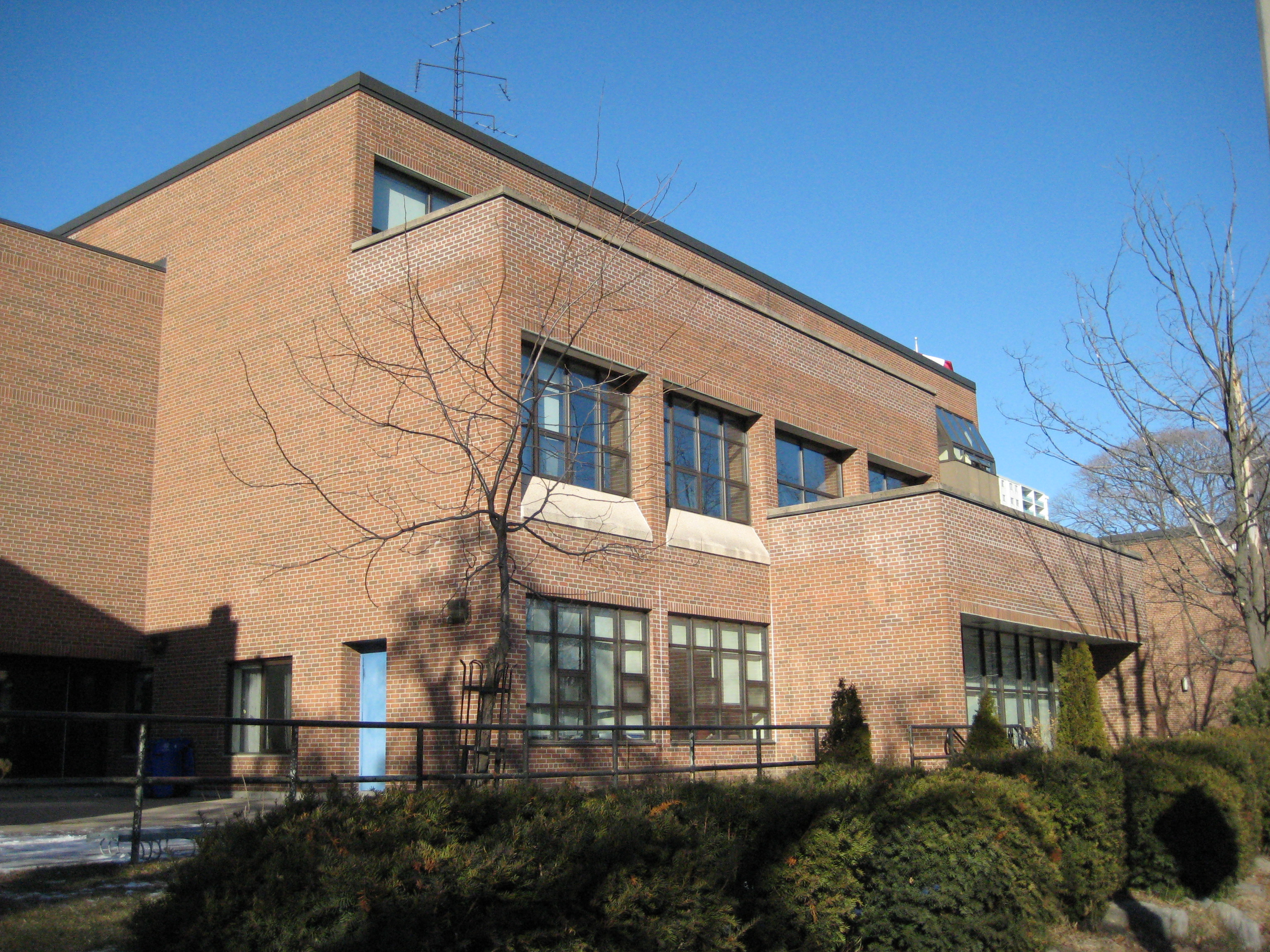

Location
- 66 Dufferin Park Avenue; Toronto, Ontario, M6H 1J6; Canada; 43°39′27.33″N 79°25′55.40″W

Information
- School type: Catholic High school IB World School
- Motto: That they may have life
- Religious affiliations: Roman Catholic (Faithful Companions of Jesus)
- Founded: 1982
- School board: Toronto Catholic District School Board (Metropolitan Separate School Board)
- Superintendent: Robert D'Addario; Area 5
- Area trustee: Frank D'Amico; Ward 6
- School number: 528 / 689381
- Principal: Lisa Gomes
- Vice Principal: Michael Simari
- CSPC Chairs (2022-2023): Rosabelle Cruz; Anna Di Paola
- Grades: 9-12
- Enrolment: 713 (2021-22)
- Area: Dufferin Grove
- Colours: Maroon and Navy Blue
- Team name: St. Mary's Huskies
- Parish: St. Anthony
- Specialist High Skills Major: Transportation
- Program Focus: International Baccalaureate; Broad-based Technology
- Website: tcdsb.org/o/stmarycatholicacademy

St. Mary Catholic Academy (also referred to SMCA, St. Mary CA, or St. Mary), previously known as St. Mary's Catholic Secondary School until Oct 2016 and Brother Edmund Rice Annex until 1984 is a Catholic secondary school located in Toronto, Ontario, Canada founded by Faithful Companions of Jesus in 1982.

== History ==
Following overcapacity issues at Brother Edmund Rice Catholic Secondary School, Brother Edmund Rice Annex was established within the building of J.J. McGrand Catholic Elementary School in 1982, positioning itself in the quiet neighbourhood of Dufferin Grove. In its initial year, one hundred and fifty ninth graders occupied one floor of the latter's building.

In 1984, following the closing of J.J. McGrand and the dispersion of its staff and students to neighbouring separate elementary schools, the Faithful Companions of Jesus formally established St. Mary's Catholic Secondary School, achieving an initial enrolment of four hundred and fifty students.

Following a period of reorganization of the Metropolitan Separate School Board between 1998 and 1999, St. Mary's became part of the renamed Toronto Catholic District School Board.

In June 2001, Brother Edmund Rice closed, resulting in St. Mary's accepting and integrating fifty students from its original founding school within its student body.

In 2014, St. Mary's began to offer the International Baccalaureate Diploma Program, serving as the TCDSB's central International Baccalaureate World School. Two years later, in 2016, the school was renamed by the TCDSB to St. Mary Catholic Academy, reflecting its new heightened pursuit of academia.

As of 2023, St. Mary Catholic Academy is the only anglophone high school remaining in the Dufferin Grove neighbourhood following the closure of Brocktown High School.

== Fraser Institute ranking ==
The Fraser Institute's 2023 report on St. Mary Catholic Academy gave it an overall grade of 5.3, ranking it at 506 of 689 secondary schools in Ontario. St. Mary's rating for the five most recent years is as follows: 6.2 in 2017, 5.2 in 2018, 6.4 in 2019, 4.6 in 2022, and 5.3 in 2023.

== Notable alumni ==
- Frank Jonke, soccer player
- John Jonke, soccer player, younger brother of Frank Jonke
- The 6th Letter, rapper

== See also ==
- Education in Ontario
- List of secondary schools in Ontario
