= Timbuktu (Canadian rapper) =

- Born: Timothy Wallace; London, Ontario, Canada
- Origin: Toronto, Ontario, Canada
- Genre: Hip-hop
- Occupations: Rapper; record producer
- Years active: 2000–present
- Labels: Droppin' Science; Urbnet Records; Hand'Solo; Backburner; Dehsloot
- Member of: Backburner; Swamp Thing
- Formerly of: My Giants; Sequestrians; Toolshed; Teenburger; Wolves
- Website: timbukturaps.com

Timothy Wallace, better known by his stage name Timbuktu, is a Canadian rapper and record producer. He is a member of the Backburner collective.

He is a former member of the groups Toolshed (with Chokeules, Psyborg and Selfhelp), Wolves (with Bix, D-Sisive, Ghettosocks and Muneshine), My Giants (with Ambition and Uncle Fester), Teenburger (with Ghettosocks), and Sequestrians (with Chokeules). He is currently a member of Swamp Thing (with Chokeules and Savillion).

As a solo artist he has released three studio albums, Stranger Danger in 2010, How Huge: The Legend of Howard Huge in 2014, and It’s Alright In the Daylight in 2021.

He graduated from Ontario Institute of Audio Recording Technology in 2007.

== Discography ==
Timbuktu

- Stranger Danger (2010)
- How Huge: The Legend of Howard Huge (2014)
- It’s Alright In the Daylight (2021)

Toolshed (Timbuktu with Chokeules, Psyborg and Selfhelp)

- Toolshed (2000)
- Clockwork Awkward (2000)
- Schemata (2002)
- Illustrated (2003)
- Relapse (2009)
- The Lost (2011)

Swamp Thing (Timbuktu with Chokeules and Savillion)

- The Grind House EP (2011)
- Creature Feature (2012)
- Firedogs (2013)
- Outer Limits (2014)
- Planet Murk (2015, produced by Peter Project)
- Pray To Science (2016)
- The Octagon (2017, with Ghettosocks)
- Horse Power (2018)
- Cherry Mongoose (2019)
- Salty Gator (2020)
- World War Swamp (2021)
- Noise Machine (2022)
- Golden Crab (2023)
- Slap Slap (2024)
- Granny Knuckles (2025)

Teenburger (Timbuktu with Ghettosocks)

- Burgertime (2011)
- Hivemind (2017) (with The Herbaliser)

Backburner (Timbuktu with Ghettosocks, Jesse Dangerously, More or Les, Wordburglar, et al.)

- Heatwave (2011)
- Heatwave Remixes (2012)
- Eclipse (2015)
- Continuum (2022)

Other collaborations

- Get the Benjamins (2005) (with Chokeules, as Sequestrians)
- Train of Thought (2011) (with Ghettosocks, Muneshine and Jeff Spec)
- Wolves (2013) (with Bix, D-Sisive, Ghettosocks and Muneshine, as Wolves)
- Million Pound Note (2020) (with Ollie Teeba)
- Thunderdome (2025) (with T.O. Huxtable)

== See also ==
- Canadian hip hop
