= Chokeules =

Canadian underground hip hop artist

- Also known as: Choke
- Born: Justin Lepine; London, Ontario, Canada
- Origin: Toronto, Ontario, Canada
- Genre: Hip-hop
- Occupation: Rapper
- Years active: 2000–present
- Labels: Hand'Solo; Dehsloot; Backburner
- Member of: Backburner; Swamp Thing
- Formerly of: Sequestrians; Toolshed
- Website: chokeules.com

Justin Lepine, best known by his stage name Chokeules, is a Canadian rapper and member of the Backburner collective. He is a former member of the groups Toolshed (with Timbuktu, Psyborg, and Selfhelp), and Sequestrians (with Timbuktu). He is currently a member of Swamp Thing (with Timbuktu and Savillion). He is a vegan.

As a solo artist he has released four albums, Clockward Awkward in 2000, Hypergraphia in 2009, Stay Up in 2014, and Nepotism in 2020. In 2012, he performed at South by Southwest.

== Discography ==
Chokeules

- Clockward Awkward (2000)
- Hypergraphia (2009)
- Stay Up (2014)
- Nepotism (2020)

Toolshed (Chokeules with Timbuktu & Psyborg)

- Toolshed (2000)
- Clockwork Awkward (2000)
- Schemata (2002)
- Illustrated (2003)
- Relapse (2009)
- The Lost (2011)

Swamp Thing (Chokeules with Timbuktu & Savillion)

- The Grind House EP (2011)
- Creature Feature (2012)
- Fire Dogs (2013)
- Outer Limits (2014)

Backburner (Chokeules with Timbuktu, Ghettosocks, Jesse Dangerously, More or Les, Wordburglar, et al.)

- Heatwave (2011)
- Heatwave Remixes [EP] (2012)
- Eclipse (2015)
- Continuum (2022)

Sequestrians (Chokeules with Timbuktu)

- Get the Benjamins (2005)

== See also ==
- Canadian hip hop
