= DJ G-Starr =

DJ G-Starr is a Canadian DJ signed to G7 Records Inc.—a subsidiary enterprise of Global 7 Entertainment Inc. G-Starr is the official tour DJ for rapper Reema Major, and has collaborated with Kwajo Cinqo of two-time Juno Award winning hip-hop group Ghetto Concept. In addition to his arrangements on rapper JJ Money's Time is Money Mixtape Sampler in 2011, G-Starr opened live for headlining emcee Mac Miller at the Incredibly Dope Tour in Montreal, Quebec, Canada (2011). While soon releasing his How to Break a Record series, G-Starr will also be launching his G7 Radio mixtape series.

== Career beginnings ==
Having grown up in Rexdale, Etobicoke, a community from which industry professionals such as K'naan, Jelleestone, Rheostatics, Bruce McDonald and Ghetto Concept all emerged, G-Starr also attended school with Canadian DJ group Baby Blue Soundcrew. While his career stemmed from DJing for Juno Award-winning hip-hop group Ghetto Concept, G-Starr has been affiliated with G7 Records since the urban record label's inception in 2004.

== Discography ==
- Aquarius Rising (2013)
- Time Is Money Mixtape Sampler (2011)
- Hip-Hop Promo Part 1 (2011)
