= Sir Pathétik =

- Born: Raphaël Bérubé; October 15, 1977 (age 48)
- Origin: Trois-Rivières, Quebec
- Genres: Hip hop; pop rap; rock; folk
- Occupations: Singer; songwriter; rapper
- Instrument: vocals
- Years active: 2000–present
- Website: http://www.sirpathetik.ca

Raphaël Bérubé, known by his stage name Sir Pathétik, is a Canadian singer, songwriter and rapper who has released a number of albums and collaborated with many artists, earning several best rapper awards from ADISQ. He started in music 2000 and when he joined the group Chosen One made of Ale Dee and Diapason after departure of Justice J, the group including Sir Pathétik was renamed Mine de rien. He and Ale Dee won the 2nd place of the competition "Hip Hop Forever 2002". After the group split up, Sir Pathétik went solo with a string of albums. He has also collaborated with many artists including Yvon Krevé, 1 Etranjj, l'Queb, Billy Nova, Da Vinci, Striger, Malik Shaheed, Asami and DJ Horg.

== Discography ==
- 2000: Demo
1. Intro
2. Conseil d'un vieille ados
3. L'accro du trippe
4. Plein de cernes
- 2003: 3 ans de trippe après
1. Intro
2. Straight up
3. 3 ans de trippe après...
4. C'Pathétik
5. T-R City Style
6. Les mains dans l'dos
7. Une vie simple
8. Catch my flow
9. Ça qu'y'é ça
10. Ché pas si
11. Comme je suis
12. 8 mai 1996
13. Faudrait jamais oublier
14. L'accroc du trippe
15. Laisse nous faire
16. Bad right now
17. C'pas toujours beau
18. Même si t'aime pas ça
- 2005: Un gars d'même
1. Intro
2. Skit
3. Live and crazy
4. Ça va mal
5. Besoin d'toi
6. Catch le vibe
7. Personne à l'abri
8. J'ai pas envie
9. J'entends parler
10. J'trouve ça plate
11. Skit
12. Un gars d'même
13. Marie-moi
14. Le party dans la foule
15. La fille que j'aime
16. J'pourrais être
17. Pathétik dans l'stéréo
18. Skit
19. J'haïrais pas ça
20. On s'en calisse
21. Maman
- 2006: Comme je suis
1. Intro
2. J’ai toute essayé
3. S’pas normal
4. Bienvenue dans rue
5. I feel so crazy (Baby)
6. Quand je feel ben
7. C’que tu penses
8. Long long time
9. Désolé
10. Dans le zoo
11. Juste comme moi
12. Quand les fils se touchent
13. T-Town Bwoi
14. Pour mon pays
15. Les choses se bousculent
16. J’aimerais ça te dire
17. Le monde change
18. Même si sa dérape
- 2007: Mauvaize Frékentation
1. '2 gars
2. J'rap pour toi
3. Dream on
4. Dangerous
5. Ma chix
6. Ceux en dedans
7. Jamais 2
8. Attendais
9. The grind
10. Ca vaut pas la peine
11. Comme ma dope
12. Dans ma bulle
13. A pas oublier
14. Wanna ride
15. Apprend à vivre
16. U don't know the half
17. Aquarium
18. Accroc du trip III
- 2008: Avant k'tu m'oublies

1. Back Again
2. Célibataire
3. La plus cool de la planète
4. Quand l'ambiance est bonne (feat. Rebel Kulcha Connection)
5. Rester soi-même (feat. J-Ron)
6. Protège-toi
7. Renonce jamais (feat. Longue Distance)
8. Faut que tu te réveilles avant (feat. Jérome Philippe)
9. C'est peut-être la bonne
10. Drôle de passe
11. J'pense à toi
12. T'aimes un badboy (feat. Von Von le Vet and 1 Étranjj)
13. Ça l'existe tu?
14. I Got Ya Talking (feat. O Eternal, Billy Nova and Jérome)
15. Comme un cauchemar
16. Quelqu'un comme moi (feat. Billy Nova)
17. S'un High
18. On s'en calisse encore
19. Cédrika (feat. K2)
20. Penses-y bien (feat. Jean-François Bastien)
21. Avant k'tu m'oublies
- 2009: Toute une Histoire

1. Drette d'in dents
2. Aime-moi encore
3. Famille séparée
4. Star du rap
5. Comme les femmes sont belles
6. La comptine d'la robine
7. Quand t'as claqué la porte
8. Prisonnier
9. Le p'tit Éric
10. J't'ai failli
11. Aime-la mieux qu'moi
12. Take me away
13. Si loin de moi
14. Sunshine
15. Toi et moi
16. La lune
17. Ta dernière chanson (feat. Dany Bédar)
- 2012: Soldat de la musique No. 32 CAN

== Awards and nominations ==
- Sir Pathétik was nominated for "Best Hip Hop Album" at the Gala of ADISQ for three consecutive years:
  - In 2005 for Sir Pathétik's album 3 ans de trippe après
  - In 2006 for Sir Pathétik's album Un gars d'même
  - In 2007 for Sir Pathétik's album Comme je suis
- In 2008 he was nominated for 4 awards in Sounds of Blackness Awards in Québec (S.O.B.A) jointly with Billy Nova for:
  - Best hip hop artist or group francophone
  - Best French language album
  - Best artist or group francophone
  - SOBA Public Choice award
