= Drezus =

Canadian rapper and activist (born 1982)

- Born: Jeremiah Manitopyes; August 28, 1982 (age 44); Saskatoon, Saskatchewan, Canada
- Occupations: Rapper; songwriter; Activist
- Years active: 2000–present
- Musical career
- Genre: Rap
- Label: Drezus Music

Jeremiah Manitopyes (born August 28, 1982), better known by his stage name Drezus (drē-zəˈs) is a Plains Cree rapper and activist based in Calgary, Alberta. Drezus' accomplishments in the field of music include awards for Best Music Video, Best Producer/Engineer, Best Rap/Hip Hop Album, and Indigenous Entertainer of the Year. These awards followed the success of his album, Indian Summer, released in the summer of 2014. However, Manitopyes' life was not always filled with awards and recognition. Growing up as a First Nations person, he faced multiple jail stints and violence in his life. Manitopyes has found meaning in his music and is working to share it with those who will listen.

== Early life ==
Jeremiah Manitopyes was born in Saskatoon, Saskatchewan on August 28, 1982.

== Music career ==
=== Early career ===
War Party, a successful Native hip-hop group from the 1990s, found themselves very impressed with the young rapper's work after he laid down a 20-minute freestyle for them. One member of the group, Big Stomp, was especially impressed with the young rapper, pointing out the fact that Manitopyes was "a diamond in the rough." He was able to keep with the beat flawlessly and had no trouble flowing with the production.

=== 2000–2012 ===
Drezus was invited to start Rezofficial, which would include some of the former members of War Party. Their debut album, The Foundation, would go on to win the Canadian Aboriginal Music Award for Best Rap/Hip-Hop album in 2004. Their big break would come in the form of an invitation to perform at the 2010 Vancouver Winter Olympic Games. However, Drezus was unable to make it. As a result of his second distribution charge, he spent three years in jail.

=== 2012–present ===
While attending a drug rehabilitation center in 2012, he took a cultural course which opened his eyes to the truth of his ancestry. As a result of such, he learned the songs of the Natives, and began to care about who he was as a person more than who he was on the streets. Although Manitopyes refers to this moment as one of the most eye-opening moments of his life, the real, single defining moment of his life would come soon after. After being released, he robbed a couple individuals in Winnipeg, but he didn't get away without repercussions. Their crew caught up to Manitopyes, robbed him of everything he had, and stomped him out. It was then that he decided he was done with this life forever.

"I had two choices: The choice to retaliate, which meant at least someone losing their life…or getting the fuck out of there," he says. "It was a real 'man-up' moment." As a result of this event, he moved back to Calgary where he found his family waiting for him, including a young son he had left behind. His life would forever change, as he started feeling a connection to the people he had once left behind. He had new perspective that would undoubtedly change his music, as demonstrated with the 2013 release of Red Winter. As a result of such album, Drezus has won multiple awards and been invited to visit and speak to government agencies such as the Calgary Youth Offender Center.

Since the release of Red Winter, Drezus has recognized the fact that songs like Warpath are not going to be played on the radio, but he says that now, he is exactly where he should be. As of 2017, he has begun work with Taboo from the Black Eyed Peas and has caught the eye of MTV/VMA with a nomination with Taboo for a possible award. Drezus, alongside Taboo with Mag7, officially won "Best Fight Against The System" MTV VMA Award in Summer 2017. He is expected to drop a new album this summer, but the future of Drezus is yet to be seen.

In August 2019, he appeared in Yellowstone (American TV series) (Season 2, Episode 8).

== Artistry ==
=== Musical style ===
Manitopyes has compared himself to artists such as Public Enemy and N.W.A with his biggest influence of all time being Ice Cube. Some of his other influences, however, include Notorious BIG, Red Hot Chili Peppers, Wu-Tang Clan, Dr. Dre, and Run-DMC. His early musical style was similar to War Party, a Native hip-hop group. He would write about the gang lifestyle, but as he grew older, after a couple jail stints, he reformed his music to act as a retelling of his story, with ties to his Native life and history.

== Activism ==
Since his recent success, Drezus has worked on giving back to his community. He holds youth/community workshops and gives keynote speeches regarding his journey. He hopes that other can learn from him and be inspired to make more of themselves and push themselves to new limits. He is currently touring, hoping to spread his influence and spread word of his journey to as many people as possible. "I would tell them that they are all young warriors and have a special place in this world as light givers. Put the phone down and go shoot some hoops, feel the sun, snow, rain or whatever and just be thankful to be alive. There is always a way out of whatever seems to be bothering you or preventing you from being happy. Be yourself, love hard and work harder. Be proud to be. One day while you're out chasing your dreams that light will find you and it will show you a whole different world full of opportunities and goodness. Go get it."

== Discography ==
- Indian Summer
  - Solomon's Prayer
  - The Sequel
  - Like This
  - Cruisin' (ft. Lightningcloud)
  - Say (ft. Inez)
  - All I Can Be (ft. K-Riz)
  - Free
  - Free Part II (ft. Fendercase)
  - Nehiyah Girl (ft. Joey Stylez)
  - Warpath
  - High Note (ft. Merkules, Nato & Sese)
  - Reminisce (ft. Hellnback & Big Slim)
  - What You Need (ft. Fayliesha)
  - The Morning After
  - Out My Window (ft. Young Kidd)
- Red Winter
  - Intro
  - Day of Action (ft. Main Flow)
  - Red Winter
  - Big Dreams (ft. Nato)
  - Feel's Good (ft. Brooklyn)
  - Me & U (ft. Inez Jasper)
  - Lose Control
  - Don't Give Up On Me
  - Rose

== Awards and nominations ==
- Indigenous Music Awards:
  - Best Music Video: Warpath
  - Best Producer/Engineer: Indian Summer
  - Best Rap/Hip-Hop Album: Indian Summer
  - Indigenous Entertainer of the Year
- Canadian Aboriginal Music Awards:
  - Best Rap/Hip-Hop Album: The Foundation
- MTV Video Music Award:
  - Best Fight Against the System with Mag7
- The SOCAN Awards:
  - Vince Fontaine Indigenous Song Award
