= Langdon Auger =

- Also known as: Lang, The A-U-G, Augz
- Born: Scott Langejan; Victoria, British Columbia, Canada
- Genres: Hip hop
- Occupations: Rapper, producer
- Years active: 1995–present
- Website: langdonauger.com

Scott Langejan, better known by his stage name Langdon Auger, is a Canadian rapper and producer from Victoria, British Columbia. He has recorded six albums and a mixtape so far.

== Early life and education ==
Auger grew up in Victoria, and graduated from Claremont Secondary School. His grandmother encouraged him to pursue his ambitions of becoming a musician. He moved to Vancouver in 2001. He studied at BCIT, earning a degree in sales and marketing.

== Career ==
In April 2003, a virtually unknown rapper at the time, Auger won the Scorch the Mic battle, a freestyle emcee competition in Vancouver BC. In June of that same year, Auger gained attention for his song "Island Nights", from the Crisp Living album, recorded in his basement. It was the first time an independent song reached number one on The Beat 94.5's Top 7 at 7 request program. "Island Nights" was later named the fourth-best-written song about Victoria by the city's top music reviewer. He was an opening act on one of Maestro's tours. In 2004 Auger released the Wizard of Augz album which spawned another hit single, "Got You Caught", which went to number one on the Beat 94.5's Top 7 at 7 as well. Later the song won third place in the R&B/hip hop category for the 2005 International Songwriting Competition. From the same album, "Pat's Song" is a tribute to the brother of his old manager, broadcast personality Dylan "Big D" Willows. Pat died in a motor vehicle accident.

In 2008, he released the album Inaugeration, again independently to a sellout crowd in Victoria, BC In 2009, Auger released "The AUG Ep", again independently. 2011 saw Auger release his 4th full-length album "The Illuminaugi" on 11/11/11. Auger's raps feature countless local references – Clover Point, the drive-thru at Wendy's, the tennis bubble at Cedar Hill Recreation Centre – but they are also full of tributes to his fallen friends and family.

Langdon was nominated as one of the best artists in Victoria in the "Times Colonist Music Awards" for 2011.

== Discography ==
- Songs from the Hills – 2001
- Island Nights – The Mixtape – 2002
- Crisp Living – 2003
- The Wizard of Augz – 2004
- Inaugeration – 2008
- The Aug EP – 2009
- The Illuminaugi – 2011

== See also ==
- Cory Bowles
- Anodajay
- Chuckie Akenz
