= Lord Kemy =

French-Canadian rapper (born 1976)

Lord Kemy is a French Canadian Hip Hop/Dancehall artist native of Guinea (West Africa).

== Biography ==
He was born in Romania in 1976 from a Romanian mother and a Guinean father. With his law degree from the Sorbonne University in Paris, he has a pretty "atypical" profile for a hip hop artist. His music is characterized by a mixture of hip hop, dancehall rhythms and reggae flavor. Since his debut album (Bakouti) in 1996, his music has continuously evolve and reshape over time. He is the leader and founder of Leg Def (Legitim' Defense) which is one of the first Hip Hop groups in Guinea in 1995. He has repeatedly been nominated and honored for his work, both in his home country and internationally. One of his most important rewards is the Kora Award of the Best African Ragga Group, won in December 2005 in Durban (South Africa) as a member of the group Leg Def.

Since 2007, Lord Kemy also has a solo career in parallel to his career as a member of the Leg Def with his younger sister Lady Lu.

He handles both rap and singing in both French and English. He currently has 4 albums to his credit, including 3 produced under his own Label, LegDef Produkt.

Lord Kemy was also present on several European stages, especially in France (where he lived during several years while studying law at La Sorbonne), also in London (UK), Lausanne, Biel and Geneva (Switzerland), etc.

== Discography ==
- Artillerie (Artillery) (2014)
- Mauvaises Langues (Gossips) (2010)
