= Rumble & Strong =

Canadian hip hop band

Rumble & Strong was a Canadian hip hop band from Toronto, active in the late 1980s. They were one of the first Canadian hip hop acts to be signed to a record label, when they signed to Gee Street Records in 1987, although they released only one EP, 1989's Crazy Jam, before breaking up.

David (MC Rumble) Morgan and Jason (DJ Jam on Strong) Charbonneau had been members of the early rap crew T.O. Vice, before forming Rumble & Strong and competing in various battle rap and DJ competitions. They recorded two songs, "What Other Emcees Sound Like" and "Strong Will Survive" for Beat Factory's 1987 Break'n Out compilation, before signing to Gee Street and releasing Crazy Jam.

Strong was the winner of the first Canadian edition of the DMC World DJ Championships in 1989. He also represented Canada In 1989 at the DMC World DJ Championship.

Following the duo's breakup, Rumble went on to a solo career. His 1993 single "Safe", a collaboration with Jamaican reggae musician King Jammy, was a Juno Award nominee for Best Rap Recording at the Juno Awards of 1994.
