= Aspektz =

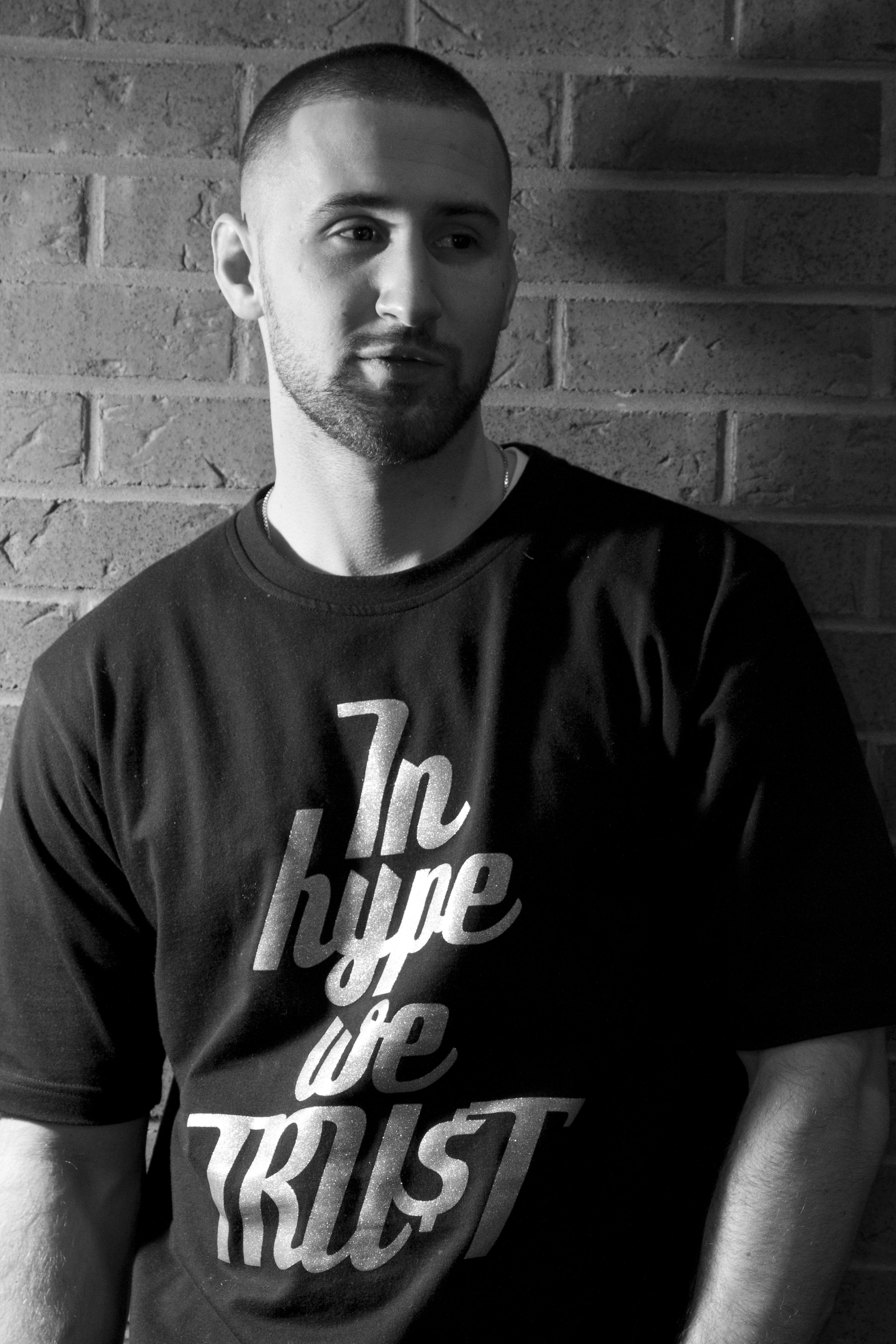
- Aspektz

Background information
- Also known as: Aspektz, Mr Thoro, Ontario Banderas
- Born: December 9, 1989 (age 35); Toronto, Ontario, Canada
- Origin: Toronto, Ontario, Canada
- Genres: Canadian hip hop
- Occupations: Rapper; singer; songwriter; record producer
- Years active: 2009–Present
- Labels: True Thorobredz (2009–present); TuneCore (2009–Present)
- Website: Official Site

Aspektz is a Canadian rapper and record producer born at North York General hospital in Toronto, in 1989. He is the founder of the True Thorobredz record label, a Canadian entrepreneur and an MBA graduate from the Schulich School of Business.

== Career ==
In 2009, Aspektz was awarded a MuchFACT video award to support the production of his first music video In the TDot, produced by Nadeem Sharpshooter Soumah. The video aired nationally across MuchMusic and MuchVibe. The single was released through True Thorobredz and on his first commercial release Academic Probation: Detention. In the TDot was also featured in the popular TV Show Private Eyes (TV series), the touch-screen videogame DJMax Technika 3, followed by placements in the mobile version DJMax Technika Q as a built-in feature record, which was downloaded over 500,000 times in 2013 and finally in the PSP version DJMax Portable in 2014. In 2010, Aspektz independently financed Fresh that also featured in dance simulation game spin-off Pump It Up Infinity, the first and only single from his second record release Academic Probation: Commencement.

In October 2010, Aspektz collaborated with HBO and Miller High Life to release a conceptual album entitled 7th Inning Stretch with vocal samples from Kenny Powers of Eastbound & Down fame. The record used the musical samples from the first season to chronicle the storyline from Kenny Powers perspective.

Aspektz graduated from the Schulich School of Business in 2011, ranked as the top business school in Canada and #5 globally. He appeared on the Business News Network in May 2011 as a current student on The Pitch to discuss his latest project and the 360-degree, immersive, interactive video technology he was shooting his videos with. He also appeared in XXL for an interview to discuss his contribution to the music industry via 360-degree video technology. The first single to utilize this technology was entitled Swivel and reached #4 on two US college charts. During the summer of 2011, he toured with Keys N Krates on the ((Red Bull)) Spectrum Electronic Festival. His 2012 single Gametime was featured on the CTV Olympic Media Consortium's nationally televised broadcast during the London 2012 Games as a featured track.

=== Future Music Forum (2017) ===
On September 14, 2017, Aspektz was invited to be a keynote speaker at the Future Music Forum conference, held in Barcelona, Spain. His keynote focused on consumer journeys, disruptive technology and how pairing the two helped to anticipate disruption in any industry, category and service.

== Discography ==
=== Studio albums ===
Album information
Academic Probation:Detention
- Released: January 22, 2010
- Label: True Thorobredz
- CRIA Certification: N/A
- RIAA Certification: N/A
- Singles: "In the TDot"

Album information
Academic Probation:Commencement
- Released: August 2, 2010
- Label: True Thorobredz
- CRIA Certification: N/A
- RIAA Certification: N/A
- Singles: "Fresh"

Album information
Miller High Life x HBO x True Thorobredz present: Eastbound & Down 7th Inning Stretch
- Released: October 10, 2010
- Label: True Thorobredz
- CRIA Certification: N/A
- RIAA Certification: N/A
- Singles: "Going Down"

Album information
Academic Probation:Last Day of Class
- Released: July 11, 2013
- Label: True Thorobredz
- CRIA Certification: N/A
- RIAA Certification: N/A
- Singles: "Worldwide, I Love Your Style (prod Rich Kidd), Snowday"

Album information
Academic Probation:Back to Class
- Released: November 29, 2013
- Label: True Thorobredz
- CRIA Certification: N/A
- RIAA Certification: N/A
- Singles: "Avion, Make It Count"

Album information
Academic Probation: The Album
- Released: December 10, 2013
- Label: True Thorobredz
- CRIA Certification: N/A
- RIAA Certification: N/A
- Singles: "In the Tdot, Fresh, Swivel, Snowday, Avion, Cutty Buddy, Gametime, I Love Your Style"

Album information
Next Level (Aspektz x Pops)
- Released: November 17, 2017
- Label: True Thorobredz
- CRIA Certification: N/A
- RIAA Certification: N/A
- Singles: "Can't Get Enough, Passport, Let's Go, See You (ft. Pluto)"

=== Singles ===
- "In the TDot"
- "Fresh"
- "Going Down"
- "Swivel"
- "Gametime (Feels Like I'm Going to Make It)"
- "I Love Your Style (prod. Rich Kidd)"
- "Avion"

Awards and Nominations
MTV MuchFACT! Awards
- 2009: In the TDot
- 2011: Snowday

=== Awards and nominations ===
- Awarded 2009 MuchFACT for In the Awarded 2011 MuchFACT for References
