= The 6th Letter =

- Also known as: Sir Al Sparkton; T$L; Mr. 4:20
- Born: Kevon André Samuels; August 13, 1992 (age 34); Toronto, Ontario, Canada
- Genre: Hip hop
- Occupation: Rapper
- Years active: 2010–present
- Labels: Above The Rest Entertainment; Bakers Club Records
- Member of: Bakers Club
- Website: www.the6thletter.com

Kevon André Samuels (born August 13, 1992), better known by his stage name The 6th Letter, is a Canadian rapper from Toronto. He is a member of the hip hop collective Bakers Club.

== Life and career ==
=== Early life and musical beginnings ===
Kevon was born on August 13, 1992, in Toronto, Ontario. He spent an early portion of his life traveling back and forth between the Flatbush section of Brooklyn, New York City where he would stay with his father (Paul McLawrence) and Downtown Toronto where he would stay with his mother (Claudette Samuels). He attended St. Mary's Catholic Secondary School in Toronto before dropping out in 2010 to pursue a career in music. Kevon adopted the moniker The 6th Letter from the nickname Freshie which was given to him in high school.

=== 2010–2011: What The F & Go Green ===
In 2010, 6th released his debut mixtape titled What The F.

== Discography ==
=== Mixtapes ===
- What The F (2010)
- Go Green (2011)
- NorthernPlayalisticGetHighMuzik (2014)
- ConeMan (2021)
- Get Baked (2022)
- ePIFFany (2022)
- The Cream Tape (2024)
