= Bryden Gwiss Kiwenzie =

Canadian singer

- Born: 1984 (age 41–42)
- Origin: Cape Croker, Ontario, Canada
- Genres: World, Indigenous Music
- Occupations: Singer, songwriter

Bryden Gwiss Kiwenzie is a Canadian musician whose debut album Round Dance & Beats (Powwow) was a shortlisted nominee for both the Juno Award for Indigenous Music Album of the Year at the Juno Awards of 2017 and Best Hand Drum Album of the year at the 2017 Indigenous Music Awards.

== Background ==
Born in 1984, Kiwenzie has Ojibwe, Odawa, Potawatomi, Delaware, Oneida and Mi'kmaq ancestry in his bloodline. Originally from Cape Croker, Ontario and Indian Brook, Nova Scotia, Kiwenzie currently lives in Sudbury.

Kiwenzie grew up on the pow wow trail, beginning his foray into the Northern Traditional dance style at age two. By age four, Kiwenzie had written his first keyboard song. By age fourteen, he had composed his first pow wow song.

Round Dance & Beats (Powwow) fuses traditional First Nations vocal chants with hip hop and rhythm and blues dance beats. The album was mixed entirely on his iPhone, though he has since received a Canada Council grant to purchase conventional recording equipment. Unlike the similar A Tribe Called Red, Kiwenzie performs many of his own vocals rather than sampling or recording other vocalists. Round Dance & Beats (Powwow) has been shortlisted for the Juno Award for Indigenous Music Album of the Year at the Juno Awards of 2017 and was nominated for the Best Hand Drum Album of the year at the 2017 Indigenous Music Awards.

He has been performing with traditional First Nations drum circles since childhood, and began pursuing a contemporary dance music style after learning how to play keyboards.

== Discography ==
- Round Dance & Beats (Powwow) (2016)
