= Lil Windex =

Canadian rapper

- Also known as: DTG
- Born: Dylan Godfrey; September 22, 1992 (age 34); Mission, British Columbia, Canada
- Genres: Hip hop, trap, satirical hip hop
- Occupation: Rapper
- Instrument: Vocals
- Years active: 2015-present
- Label: DTG Music Inc.

Dylan Godfrey (born September 22, 1992), better known by his stage name Lil Windex or DTG is a Canadian rapper. He is known for the humorous and satirical tone of his lyrics.

== Career ==
=== 2015–2017: Career beginnings ===
Godfrey began his career as a YouTuber uploading videos under the name DTG. His content was mainly comedic skits, sometimes of other local artists, as well as music videos for his early demos.

In 2015, he posted a video called “How NOT To Be A Rapper” on his Facebook page — a skit poking fun at simple minded rap music, which went on to become a viral success.

=== 2017–present: Lil Windex ===
In 2017 Godfrey began posting videos under the name Lil Windex, and shortly after released his first single "Cleanin Up" which gained more than 10 million views on YouTube, establishing the character.

His subsequent 2018 single "Bitcoin Ca$h" received further media attention. One Mashable editor proclaimed "cryptocurrency has finally reached its final form of dominance in our culture".

Through 2021, Godfrey released singles which fans turned to an album. His most notable song from this time period was “Life Goes On”, with Yellowbunny.

== Personal life ==
He is married and has 2 children. In a 2018 interview he was quoted as saying he wants to build a great future for his family, and spends as much time with them as possible.

== Discography ==
- Cleanin Up (2017)
- Idk (DTG Music Inc., 2018)
- Small Talk (2019) (Ft. Lil Def & Mafia Beatz)

== See also ==
- Canadian hip hop
- Satirical hip hop
