= Don Cash =

Canadian rap artist and record producer

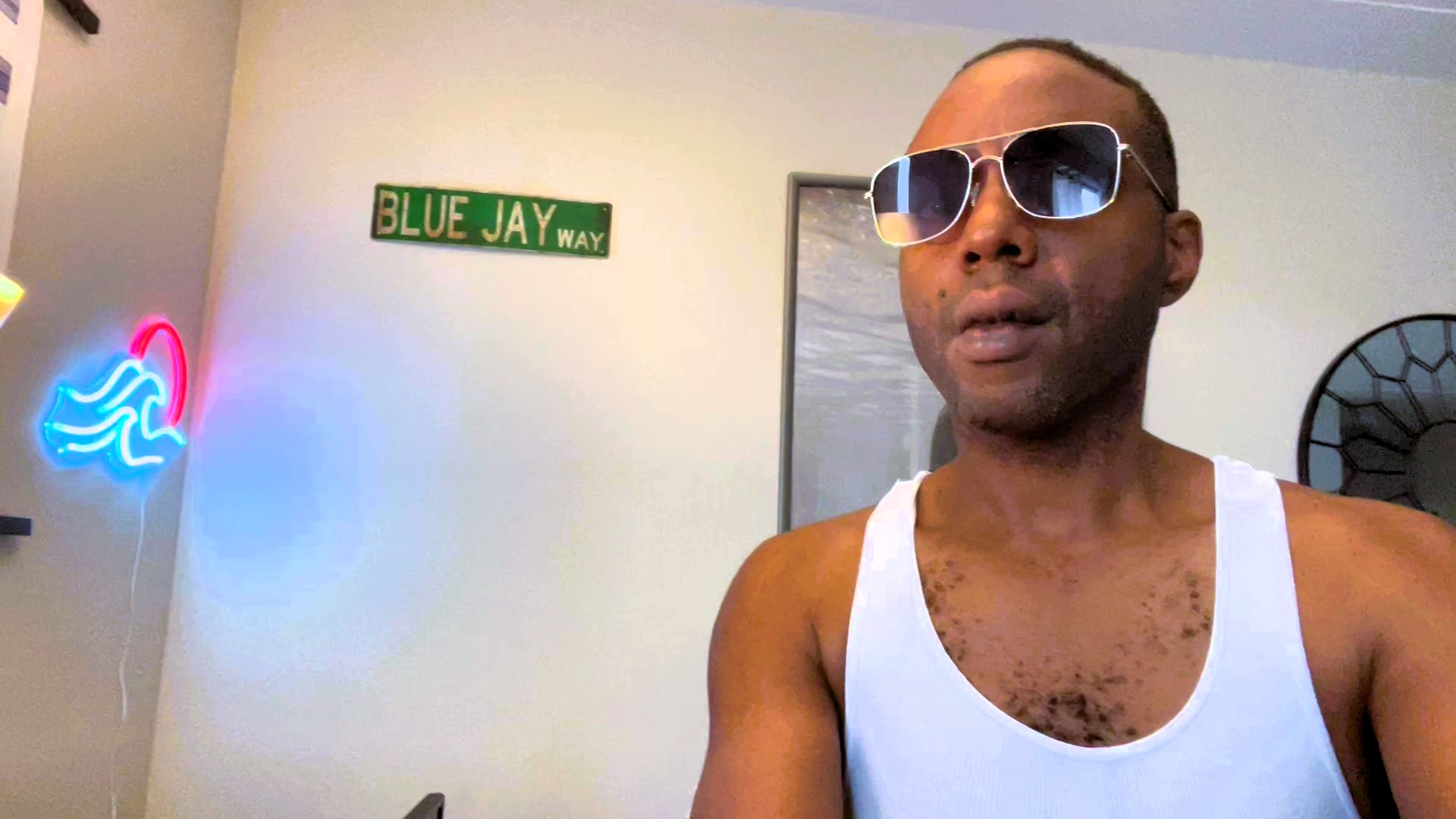
- Don Cash, Canadian record producer and artist, Ontario, Canada December 2023

Background information
- Born: April 6, 1978 (age 48); Brampton, Ontario, Canada
- Genre: Rap
- Occupations: Rapper, record producer
- Years active: 2001-present
- Labels: Stereoeagle, Relish, URBNET Records
- Website: rulez.live

Don Cash (born April 6, 1978 in Brampton, Ontario, Canada) is a Canadian rap artist and record producer.

== Career ==
In 2001, after several years working as a teenage pop journalist in Toronto, Cash decided to focus on writing and producing songs at home on his computer, releasing at least ten known full-length CD-R albums in downtown Toronto and New York City. Though distribution was unofficial and limited, news of the works by the young artist spread. By 2004, Cash had been featured in The Fader magazine and had gained high-profile friends and admirers in the avant-garde pop music scene including James Murphy from LCD Soundsystem and DFA Records.

In 2006, Cash released the album On The Bus on his Stereoeagle label. The debut work, which contained the club hits "Star Dust" and "Don't Crash", caught the attention of Berlin label boss and dj/producer Headman, who signed Cash to his indie electro imprint Relish. Cash released the album II in 2007 via Relish and had success with "Disco Wreck" and "Hey There", while being remixed by Zongamin and Street Life DJs. The album was a hit with critics and audiences alike, garnering raves in The Sunday Times, i-D magazine and NME.

Cash spent 2008 touring in Europe, while writing and recording new songs. Freshy Fresh, Cash's third full length effort, was released in May 2010 on URBNET Records in partnership with Stereoeagle. In November 2010, Cash followed up Freshy Fresh by releasing Unbreakable on stereoeagle/URBNET. Containing 15 new songs written and produced by the artist, Unbreakable was Cash's first all rap LP in almost ten years.

== Style ==
Most of Cash's songs draw on varying elements commonly associated with, hip-hop, rock and electro. In 2004, The Fader's, Knox Robinson, christened Cash's sound "afroclash," a play on the "electroclash" trend sweeping the New York underground. Cash himself claimed in several 2007 interviews that his music was simply rock & roll, though he allowed that it could be dubbed "new wave rap" if one were desperate to find a correct classification for his musical style.
