= Webster (hip-hop artist) =

Canadian Hip hop artist

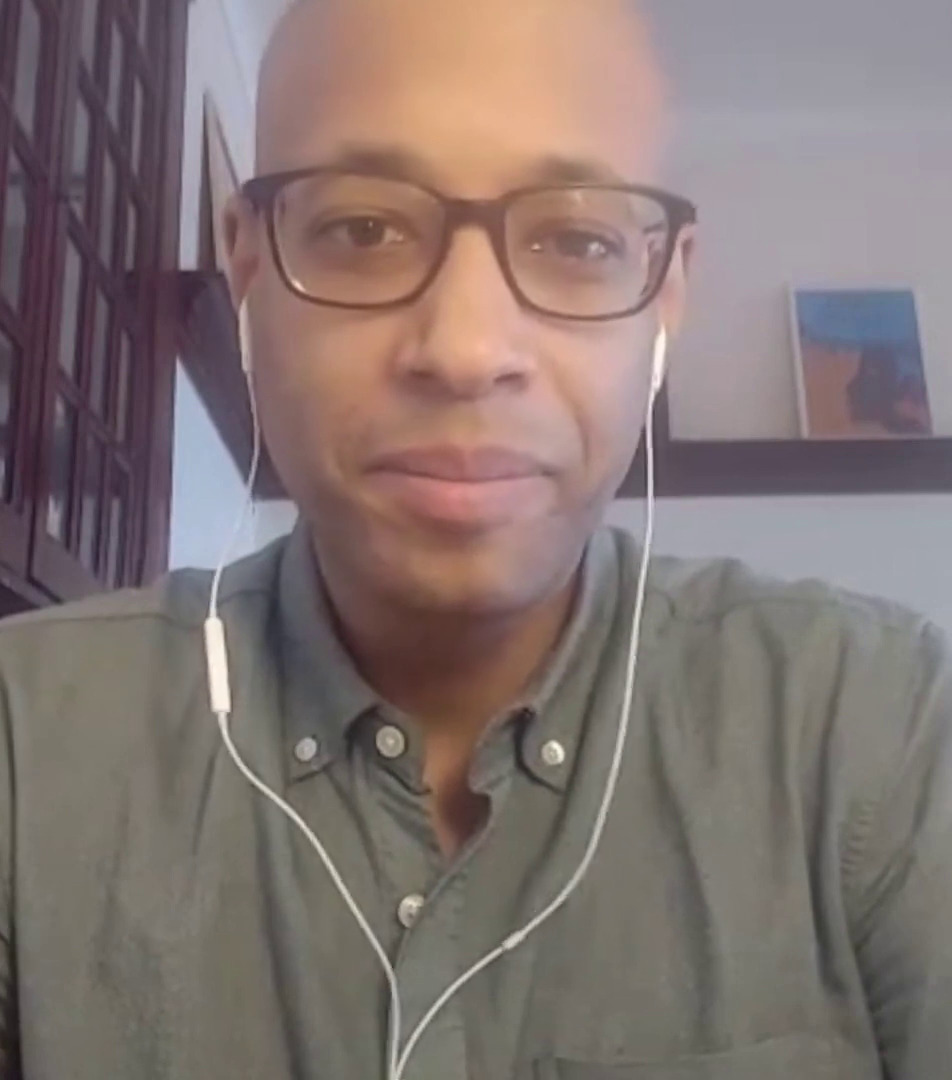
Webster in 2021.

Aly Ndiaye, also known as Webster (born December 15, 1979, in Quebec City, Quebec) is a Canadian hip hop artist, TV show host and historian.

== Biography ==
Ndiaye was born in La Cité-Limoilou borough of Quebec City. He is the son of a Senegalese father and a French-Canadian mother. The former taught political science at Cégep Garneau.
