= Emay (rapper) =

Canadian rapper (born 1991)

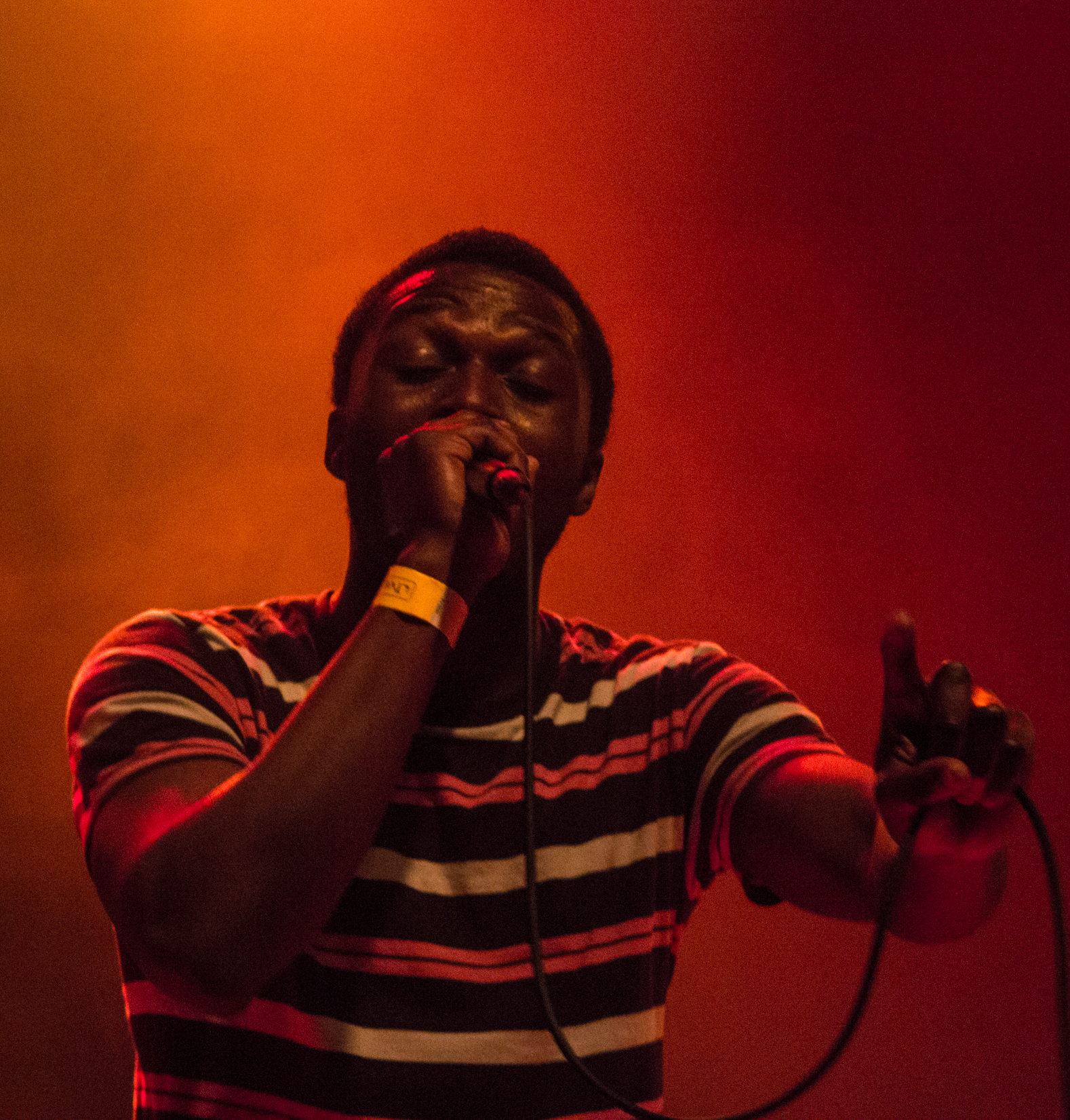
- Emay performing in 2016

Background information
- Also known as: Mubarik Gyenne-Bayere; Emay
- Born: Mubarik Gyenne-Adams; December 18, 1991 (age 34); Montreal, Quebec, Canada
- Origin: Hamilton, Ontario, Canada
- Genre: Hip hop
- Occupation: Rapper
- Instruments: Vocals; Sampler; Drum machine; Piano
- Years active: 2008–present
- Labels: Last Gang; Hi-Scores Recording Library; Jet Jam
- Website: emay.bandcamp.com

Mubarik Gyenne-Adams (born December 18, 1991) known professionally as Emay, is a Canadian rapper from Hamilton, Ontario.

== Early life ==
Mubarik Gyenne-Adams (preferred name Mubarik Gyenne-Bayere) was born in Montreal, Quebec on December 18, 1991, the son of a couple who had immigrated to Canada from Ghana. He and his four sisters were raised in the tradition of Islam by his single mother. The family regularly moved between shelters throughout Ontario, living in Brampton briefly before settling in Hamilton.

== Career ==
The stage name Emay comes from Mubarik Adams's initials written as a phonogram. Emay began his musical career in 2008 releasing mixtapes and collaborations. In 2012, Emay released his debut album entitled Adam. His first extended play, entitled Into It, was released later that year. In 2014 he released his second extended play, which was entitled Sinner, Song-writer. In 2017, Emay released his first music video for the track "Bakkah: The History of Humankind". The song includes samples of Bizzy Bone and Leonard Cohen’s "Famous Blue Raincoat". Emay released his sophomore album entitled Ilah in 2017. "Israfil 'Angels Trumpet'" was the first track from the album to be released as a single.

== Discography ==
=== Studio albums ===
- Adam (2012)
- Ilah (2017)
- .nk (2026) (As nk. archaic)

=== Mixtapes ===
- A.D.D. (Altered Dynamic Dimensions) (2008)
- Emay, Karen O, and the Kids (2010)
- Rock. Paper. Scissors. (2010) (with EOM and Remot as Rockpaperscissors)
- Mind Altering Dynamics (2011)
- Mind Altering Dynamics (Instrumentals) (2011)
- Incorruptible (2011)

=== Extended plays ===
- Sounds Like (2010) (with Ivan Ice)
- Into It (2012)
- Sinner, Song-Writer (2014)

=== Singles ===
- "Child (Refugee)" (2009)
- "Ze Drums" (2010) (with Ivan Ice)
- "Worried Shoes" (2010)
- "Breaking" (2010) (with Star Slinger and Blackbird Blackbird as Seeing Suge)
- "Israfil 'Angels Trumpet'" (2016)
- "Yesu" (2017)
- "Paystyle" (2018) (as nk. archaic)
- "Republic of New Afrika" (2020)
- "Sns." (2024) (As nk. archaic)

=== Guest appearances ===
- M+A – "Takes Me Back (M+A Remix)" from M+A Remixes.yes (2012)
- M+A – "When" from These Days (2013)
- M+A – "When" from When (2014)
- Mother Tareka – "Blow" from Imagine Something Different (2015)
- Klune – "Cinnamon" from Klune (2015)
- Quadrafonics – "Kissing the Gun" from Assemble (2016)

=== Compilation appearances ===
- "Fresh Prince 2019 – Hjemmesnekk" from Fresh Prince 2019 – Hjemmesnekk (2019) (with Cree, unge Almen, and Hammern)
- "Because Winter (feat. Lowell Boland)" from URBNET: Underground Hip-Hop Volume 7 (2011)
