= Asuquomo =

Nigerian-Canadian rapper and singer (born 1993)

- Born: Emeka Morris Ogbowu; May 15, 1993 (age 33); Port Harcourt, Nigeria
- Occupations: Rapper; singer; visual artist; filmmaker
- Musical career
- Genres: Hip hop; Afrobeats
- Instrument: Vocals
- Years active: 2018–present
- Label: Secretly Publishing International

Emeka Morris Ogbowu (born May 15, 1993), better known as Asuquomo, is a Nigerian-Canadian rapper, singer and visual artist based in Ottawa. In 2020, he won the RBC x Ottawa Arts Council's Emerging Artist of the Year Award. As a performer, he has opened for international artists such as Burna Boy, WizKid, and Lido Pimienta.

== Early life and education ==
Asuquomo was born in Nigeria, and moved to Canada to attend university in 2012. He is a graduate of Algonquin College, with a certificate in professional illustration and concept art from Algonquin's school of media and design.

== Career ==
Asuquomo is known for both visual and auditory storytelling; his works have been described as having a Pan-African narrative as Afro-Fusion influences. He has been an opening act for Wizkid and Grammy-nominated Burna Boy, as well as Mdou Moctar, Shay Lia, Zaki Ibrahim, Violent Ground, Jazz Cartier, Lido Pimienta, Cadence Weapon, Kimmortal, BROCKHAMPTON, Keynes Woods, and Kodie Shane. He has played festivals including Marvest CityFolk, Ottawa RBC Bluesfest and Arboretum Festival.

In 2018, he released the mixtape This That Mo.

In June 2020, Asuquomo released his EP, Diobu, which received support from the Ontario Arts Council. He had begun working on the EP in 2018, during an artist residency at the Banff Centre for Arts and Creativity. The album was well received by critics. Pitchfork described it as a project which "[exploring] themes of family, home, and the immigrant experience in his adopted city."The EP was featured on Exclaim!'s "Best EP's of 2020", CBC’s All in a Day, and HotNewHipHop.

In September 2020, he released the music video for "Don't Be Scared." Following the release, American Songwriter Magazine described the visuals as "piercing, personal, intriguing and entrancing."

== Discography ==
Albums

- Diobu (2020) - EP
- OT Riddim (2020) - EP
- This That Mo (2018) - Mixtape

Singles

- “Yahweh” (2020)
- “Wide Awake” (2020)
- “Northside” (2019)

== Filmography ==
- Don't Be Scared
