= KO (musician) =

Canadian musician (born c. 1986)

- Born: Ko Kapches
- Origin: Canadian
- Genres: Hip hop; folk; reggae; R&B; alternative rock
- Occupations: Musician; singer-songwriter
- Instruments: Acoustic guitar; Vocals
- Labels: Atlantic Records, Warner Music Canada, Great Music Agency
- Website: ko-nation.com

Ko Kapches (born c. 1986), better known by the stage name KO (/ˈkoʊ/ KOH), is a Canadian musician whose music is a mix of folk, hip hop, reggae, rock and R&B —a sound which KO refers to as "urban-funk and urban-folk".

== Early life and musical career ==
KO was born into a middle class Greek family in Toronto; his mother was a curator for the Royal Ontario Museum and his father a real estate lawyer. Raised in the Toronto neighbourhood of Riverdale, KO grew up in a musical environment; "we always had guitars around," KO said in an interview. "I even went for guitar lessons, but after two or three lessons my teacher told me that my hands were too small and that I would never be a guitar player. I never went back."

While staying with friends involved in hip hop, he began to experiment with recording guitar over drum beats and eventually laid some tracks in a recording studio. His parents recognized that KO was becoming serious about his music and helped to connect him with someone in the music business. By 2006 he was signed by Atlantic Records New York, along with their Canadian affiliate Warner Music Canada later that same year.

In 2019 he started working with manager Ivan Albery Powell and Great Music Agency. He released the hit song Leaving California and a video for Rise Up later that same year.

== Musical style and influences ==
KO's musical style borrows elements from hip hop, folk, rock, R&B and reggae. His songs mainly feature vocals and acoustic guitar played over hip hop beats and his sound has been compared to that of musician Everlast. Although he experimented with rapping early in his music career, he has stated in an interview that he wasn't impressed by his own rapping ability and has focused his vocal efforts on singing.

KO is a fan of Nirvana and has cited Kurt Cobain as a musical influence — "Kurt Kobain" is also the title of a single from his debut album. In the bio section of KO's official website he also states that he is "still influenced by Toronto's underground rap community" and lists Everlast, Kid Rock, Ani DiFranco, Thelonious Monk and Van Morrison as some of his favourite artists.

== Debut album ==
KO's debut album Let's Blaze was released Aug 25, 2009; he went on to open for some of Snoop Dogg's tour dates the fall of that same year. KO's debut single "Capable" was picked up by local Toronto modern rock radio station 102.1 The Edge and he was nominated for the station's 2010 CASBY Awards in the categories of "Favourite New Album" and "Favourite New Artist". He also opened for De La Soul in 2010.

== Video production ==
KO edits his own videos and posts them to his YouTube channel. His video posts include official versions of his videos for the tracks "Capable", "Let's Blaze", "The Ballad of Jimmy Roscoe", "Kurt Kobain", "Bourbon (Crack Song)", and "Moving Mountains" as well as remixes and live versions of various songs, both of his own work and others.

== Discography ==
=== Albums ===
- Let's Blaze (2009)
- Welcome to T Dot (2010)
- Corrupted Nostalgia (2017)
- Unplugged at Cherry Beach (2018)
- Bermuda Triangle (2020)

=== Singles ===
Year	Song	Chart peak	Album
Year	Song	CAN Alt	Album
2009	"Capable"	9	Let's Blaze
2011	"Moving Mountains"	23	Let's Blaze
2011	"Kurt Kobain"	40	Let's Blaze
2012	"My Life"	—	
2019	"Leaving California"	—	
