= Lil Pappie =

Canadian singer (born 1991)

- Born: Nicholaus John Michael Gordon; October 28, 1991 (age 35)
- Origin: London, Ontario, Canada
- Genres: Pop, Hip hop
- Occupations: Singer, rapper, songwriter
- Years active: 2007–present
- Label: Independent
- Website: www.lilpappie.com

Nicholaus John Michael Gordon (born October 28, 1991), better known by his stage name Lil Pappie, is a Canadian singer, rapper and songwriter of Dakota and European descent.

== Career ==
In 2008, Lil Pappie appeared on the sixth season of Canadian Idol. On December 1, 2009, Pappie released his debut single "I Want Chu SSSo Bad". In October 2010, Pappie released his second single "Hypnotized". The track was recorded at Cherry Beach Sound in Toronto, Ontario. On June 18, 2011, Pappie performed at APTN's Aboriginal Day Live at The Forks in Winnipeg, Manitoba to an audience of over 10 000.
