= Backburner (hip-hop group) =

Canadian hip hop group

- Origin: Halifax, Nova Scotia, Canada
- Genres: Underground hip hop Canadian hip hop
- Years active: 2001–present
- Labels: Backburner; Hand'Solo
- Members: Ambition; Beatmason; Chokeules; Dexter Doolittle; MC Frank Deluxe; Fresh Kils; Ghettosocks; Ginzuintriplicate; Jay Bizzy; Jesse Dangerously; Johnny Hardcore; Manalive; Mister E More or Les; Peter Project; Psybo; Savilion; Thesis Sahib; Timbuktu; Uncle Fester; Wordburglar

Backburner is a Canadian underground hip-hop group and musical collective, formed by frequent collaborators Fresh Kils, Uncle Fester, Dexter Doolittle, and Process in Halifax, Nova Scotia in 2001. The collective includes 21 members. Their name comes from the habit of starting new projects and leaving others on the back burner.

In 2001, the collective released Big Talk, followed in 2004 by the mixtape What Have You Done For Rap Lately? The crew has released three official, commercially available studio albums: Heatwave in 2011, Eclipse in 2015, and Continuum in 2022. Music videos were released for the title track from Heatwave, and "Bottle Caps" from Eclipse.

== Discography ==
Mixtapes

- Big Talk (2001)
- What Have You Done For Rap Lately? (2004)

Studio albums

- Heatwave (2011)
- Eclipse (2015)
- Continuum (2022)

EPs

- Heatwave Remixes (2012)
