= Étienne (Canadian musician) =

Canadian Musician born 1971

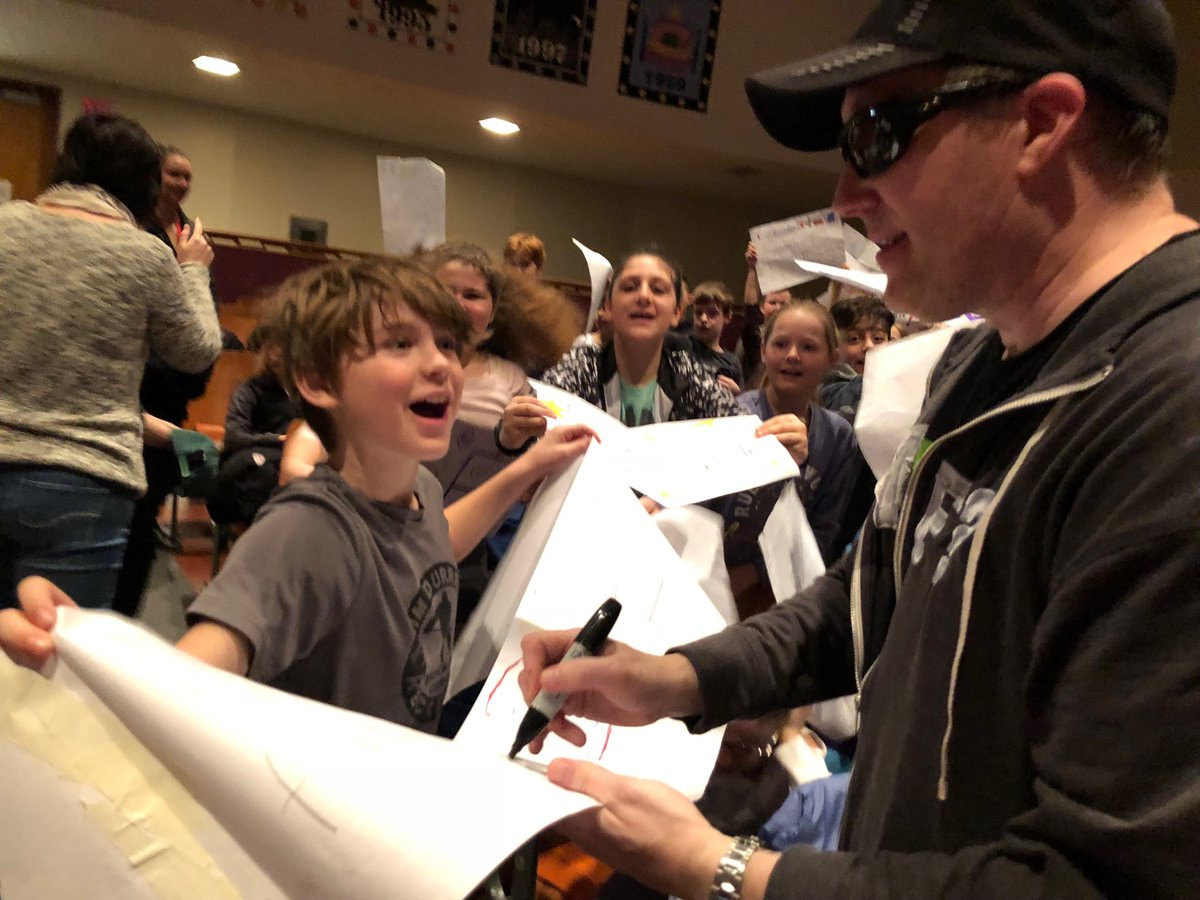
- Étienne in 2018

Background information
- Born: Steven Langlois; February 28, 1971 (age 55); Windsor, Ontario, Canada
- Genres: Rock, pop, hip-hop, electronic
- Occupations: Singer, recording artist, producer
- Instruments: Vocals, piano, keyboard, guitar, drums
- Years active: [1993–present]
- Label: Warner Music Canada
- Website: www.educorock.com

Étienne is the stage name of Canadian musician Steven Douglas Langlois (born February 28, 1971). He has performed sold-out concert tours in theaters and arenas across Canada, the United States, China, New Zealand and Australia.

== Biography ==
Born and raised in Windsor, Ontario, Canada, Étienne began performing at the young age of nine and a half years old. While attending the University of Windsor, where he graduated with a B.A. in French Language and Literature and a B.Ed., he began composing his first few educational songs while attending Teachers' College in 1993. His career as an educational performing artist began by accident in February 1994 when he shared a few songs he had composed with some teaching colleagues at a district school board meeting in Stratford, Ontario. It was at this meeting where he was jokingly crowned with the stage-name "Étienne" (the French translation of his birth name Steven). Étienne recorded his first album, self-titled "Étienne" that same summer. Étienne has since released nine French albums, two English albums, and two Spanish albums.

In 1999, he released the first of his two Spanish albums, which were both followed by concert tours in the United States. In 2003 and 2004, he released two English language albums for students. Those albums were distributed by Pacific Music/Warner Music Canada. Étienne was nicknamed the "Eminem of educational French music" or "Drake of educational French music" by some of the teachers who became exposed to his music.

After 13 album releases and several tours, Étienne has built a worldwide fan-base among educators and students alike. The most recognizable fan of Étienne is popstar Justin Bieber who sang the Étienne song "Avoir II" live on national TV in France on the Canal+ segment La boîte à questions in 2012.

On top of recording albums and producing videos, Étienne has authored, consulted, and composed for several international school programs produced by leading educational companies including Thomson Nelson, Oxford University Press, Pearson Education, Prentice Hall, Ginn, Gage Canada, Xpresslab, and Denmark's Forlag Malling Beck.

In 2014, Étienne surprised fans by releasing an album under a different stage name: DJ DELF. In May 2018, Educorock signed an independent Canadian musician who took on the role of DJ DELF. Étienne continues to perform concerts under his original stage name. Étienne is currently working on a 25th-anniversary release complete with remixes of fan-voted favorites with help from new educational artists Nate Vedette, Guy Tariste, Mike Musique, and DJ DELF, with whom Étienne tours.

In 2019, YouTuber and heavy metal drummer Joey Muha released a video where he played along to Étienne's song "Avoir II".

Étienne was featured in the 2019 documentary Pourquoi Take French?: 25 Years of Étienne which focused on his career and its impact on teachers, students, and musicians alike. In conjunction with the documentary, Étienne released "Étienne XXV": a greatest hits album featuring fan-selected favorites. These songs were then remixed and re-recorded with the help of artists Nate Vedette, Mike Musique, Guy Tarise, and DJ DELF.

Now residing in LaSalle, Ontario, teaching at Sandwich Secondary School, he has taught English, French, and History to students from grades one to twelve.

== Recent awards and honours ==
- Winner of the "Canada's Favourite Children's Artist of the Year Award (2004)" (CMW "Indies" Awards). Nominees for this award were chosen by members of the music industry, and winners were determined by national fan-based voting.
- Winner of the "2003 Children's Album of Year", award at the Canadian Music Week "Indies" Awards ceremony where his CD "C'est le temps" was chosen over those of many established Children's artists including Fred Penner.
- Recipient of the 2003 Helen B. St. John Award for "outstanding professional contribution and leadership in the field of modern languages" from the Ontario Modern Language Teachers' Association. Étienne is the youngest person to be awarded this honour.
- Winner of a "2002 Parents' Choice Award" for his video "Rockumentaire". This educational music video was placed on the same esteemed list as the then, newly released Harry Potter film. His CD, "C'est le temps", also won the "2002 Parents' Choice Award".
- Featured in the Rascallion Productions documentary entitled “Pourquoi Take French? – 25 Years of Étienne.” Documentary descriptor reads: The accidental Rockstar. Explore the life and career of teacher and iconic musician Étienne. HD. Length: 1h28m

== Discography ==
- "Étienne s/t" CD - 1994
- "Chez Moi" CD - 1996
- "La danse des araignees" CD - 1998
- "Educorock Espanol" CD - 1999
- "C'est le temps" CD - 2002
- "Grammar Jams" CD - 2003
- "Grammar Jams 2" CD - 2004
- "Me gusta" CD - 2005
- "Beauty of Discovery" (single) - 2006
- "Le retour" CD - 2008"
- "Français! Francais!" CD w/ Roland Bibeau - 2010
- "Chantons les classiques !" CD - 2013
- "DJ DELF" CD/DVD - 2014
- "Étienne XXV" CD - 2019

== Filmography ==
- "Rockumentaire" (Videos Collection) - 1999
- "Étienne: Los videos espanoles" - 2011
- "Étienne: Les vidéos françaises" - 2011
- "DJ DELF" – Animated Videos Package – 2016
- "TikTok: @rockyourclassroom" - 2019
