= Dee (singer) =

- Born: Martin Granger; Montreal, Quebec
- Genres: Electro-pop dance-rock
- Occupations: Singer; songwriter; disc jockey; producer; multi-instrumentalist; remixer
- Website: deemusic.com

Dee (born Martin Granger) is an electro-pop dance-rock Canadian singer, songwriter, disc jockey, producer, multi-instrumentalist, and remixer.

Dee was born in Montreal and raised in Welland, Ontario and Aylmer, Quebec. He moved back to Montreal at the age of eighteen. In 1998, he became the leader of The Urbanauts; they released the album Stereotonic in 1999. The Urbanauts were nominated for Best Pop Artist at the Montreal Independent Music Awards (MIMI's), but disbanded in 2001. Dee released a five-song EP in 2002. In 2004, Dee and his band members Martin Shank and Reda Enan appeared and performed the song "Slapped" in the film CQ2 directed by Carole Laure.

In 2005, alongside Kid Loco, Sixtoo, Ariane Moffatt, and DJ Champion, Dee remixed a song on the album Jaune 2005 to commemorate the thirty-fifth anniversary of the release of the classic French-Canadian album Jaune by Jean-Pierre Ferland. Also in 2005, five songs by Dee were featured in the soundtrack of the French-Canadian indie film Horloge biologique (Dodging the Clock) directed by Ricardo Trogi.

Dee released his first album in 2006 on the Canadian indie label La Tribu. Some songs on the album feature singer Mel, a close collaborator. Granger also released a song and music video entitled Lonelygirl on the web in 2006. The song is a tribute to or parody of the lonelygirl15 phenomenon, and the music video was shot in an exact replica of the lonelygirl15 bedroom. The video was added on 9 November 2006, and eventually featured on the front page of YouTube on 26 February 2007.

A song by Dee called "Miles and Miles", whose lyrics include the line "I like to live on the edge", was in late 2006, the theme song of Ford's marketing campaign for the crossover Ford Edge. The campaign featured emerging performers and musical celebrities, including Beyoncé, Kelis, and Funkmaster Flex.

Dee and his band have performed at various venues and music festivals in Canada over the years, including Montreal Jazz Fest, North by Northeast, Canadian music week, Mont-Tremblant Music Symposium, Divers/Cité, Quebec City Summer Festival, and more.

"After a stint as a guest musician in Cirque du Soleil's 2011 summer production of Kingdom of Tin in Quebec City, DEE returned to the studio to begin a new creative cycle. The fruit of that effort is the concept album The Space Between Us, whose narrative evokes the interstellar expanse between an astronaut on a mission and his fiancée back on Earth. Evidently, the time has come for DEE to launch into the stratosphere. The Space Between Us [was released] November 18th 2014."

== Discography ==
- 2002: Dee (five-song EP)
- 2006: Dee
- 2008: Day by Day
- 2014: The Space Between Us
