= Arabesque (rapper) =

- Also known as: Besque
- Born: Stephen Kawaleet; September 17, 1981 (age 45); Toronto, Ontario, Canada
- Genre: Alternative hip hop
- Occupation: Rapper
- Instrument: Vocals
- Years active: 1998 – present
- Labels: Skin I'm In, Sin Nombre, Yanase, Universal
- Website: Arabesque on Myspace

Arabesque, also known as Besque (born Stephen Kawaleet, September 17, 1981), is a Juno nominated rapper from Toronto, Ontario, Canada. He studied graphic communications management at Ryerson University (now Toronto Metropolitan University). He has signed record deals in the US, Canada, the UK and Japan.

== Career ==
At the age of 16, Arabesque started his career in the music industry as a freelance contributor to various urban publications, interviewing the likes of Flavor Flav and A-Trak, and writing featured hip-hop editorials. In 2000, shortly after he and his cousin formed a group, Babylon Point, their demo received acclaim from Vice magazine, sparking interest among underground purists and tape junkies. However, Babylon Point split up shortly afterwards. Besque joined a Toronto-based political soul collective, Revolution Records, on their 45" vinyl release "Sounds of Revolution" headed by the DJ and producer Complex.

In mid-2002, Besque released his first solo single to commercial radio with much success. "Choked Up", an ode dedicated to the tragic loss of his high school girlfriend was produced by Sy Wyld and featured vocals by the BBE Music singer Slakah the Beatchild. The single started a number of charting 12" singles. Besque then accepted clothing line sponsorships from the New York company One Serious Threat and, later, from the Los Angeles-based clothing line, Scifen.

Arabesque's budding success caught the attention of the British label, Sin Nombre. He signed with the Nottingham-based label for his first full-length release, The Frenzy of Renown, in early 2005, the album being distributed by Universal Records. The executive producer was Anonymous Twist from Toronto. Arabesque's first video, for the album Bellyache (directed by Cazhj) received rotation on Much Music's Rap City, shortly after shooting a video for the single "Stardust" (directed by Marc Andre Debruyne).

In February 2007, The Frenzy of Renown was nominated for a Juno Award in Canada. The awards ceremony was hosted by Nelly Furtado. Tracks from the album including "Mamma Dig Me", "Bellyache" and "Stardust"" entered the charts that year.

In June 2006, Arabesque toured the Middle East with the Grammy reggae singer Sean Paul. Later in the year, he toured with Aceyalone from Los Angeles. Besque has opened for Raekwon, Little Brother, Zion I, Dilated Peoples and Method Man in shows and festivals.

In November 2007, Arabesque joined Rah Digga, on his EP Hang Your Heroes, a melodic album that strikes a good balance between gritty vocals and beats that range from jazzy to soulful to those meant to rock the disco. A single from the EP, "Nature's Phone", entered the urban/dance charts and was played on BBC 1Xtra. The video was recorded by the SXSW Film Festival winner Drew Lightfoot, with Melanie Durrant and Slakah the Beatchild. Hang Your Heroes included the songs "Pablo Picasso" (produced by Chunksahoy) and "Marlboro Man". An animation/live action video was made by David Fradkin for "Anna Conda".

During September 2008, Yokohama-Cities Yanase Records signed Arabesque. The Japanese label released his Last Life in the Universe.

== Discography ==
Album	Label	Release date
The Frenzy of Renown	Sin Nombre/Universal	December 2005
Hang Your Heroes	Skin I'm In/Urbnet	December 2007
Last Life in the Universe (Japan)	Yanase	September 2008
