= Merlin Bronques =

- Also known as: Merlin
- Born: Brooklyn, New York, U.S.
- Origin: Aylmer (Gatineau), Quebec, Canada
- Genres: Industrial rock, rap
- Occupations: photographer, musician
- Years active: 1993–present
- Website: lastnightsparty.tv

Merlin Bronques is an American musician, artist and photoblogger based in New York City. He is best known for the website lastnightsparty.com, of which he is the founder and sole photographer.

== Early years ==
Bronques was born in Brooklyn, New York, United States, and grew up partly in Montreal and Aylmer, Quebec, Canada.

== Career ==
=== Music ===
As a musician, he enjoyed popularity during the mid-1990s under the name Merlin. His 1993 self-produced first album A Noise Supreme was a blend of industrial rock and rap: "acid-dipped/metal/jazz/grunge fusion" according to Billboard. The album received critical praise and generated a fanbase in Canada, partly due to MuchMusic airplay of the video for the single "Pusher."

In 1996, Merlin released the album Merlin's Arcade, "a most enjoyable slice of ear candy" according to AllMusic. The single "The Playboy Interview" also received some airplay on MuchMusic. He also founded the pop-rock band Ma, whose album Cool Chicks and Other Babes drew comparisons to Weezer and released the industrial album Viddy Well Little Brother in 1997. In 2001 he released his major-label debut, Merlin's Milkbar Stereo.

He later formed the group NAM:LIVE!, which he disbanded after finding success as a nightlife photographer. He claims to have no formal training and was first introduced to photography by his father who is a studio photographer.

=== LastNightsParty.com ===
Bronques's photoblog, LastNightsParty.com, offers a behind-the-scenes look into parties around the world. It was launched in 2004. LastNightsParty.com’s galleries of hipsters, models, and the fashion community has a global audience. LastNightsParty is also an Abrams book released worldwide. Bronques's photographs have been praised for their ability to capture the "energy" of a party.

A book of his photographs, lastnightsparty: Where Were You Last Night? (ISBN 9780810949027), was published in 2006.

Bronques later launched LastNightsParty.tv as a source of video and blog content.
