= Jairus Sharif =

Canadian experimental jazz musician

- Genres: Experimental jazz; Free jazz
- Occupations: Musician; Composer; DJ
- Instruments: Alto saxophone; Turntables; Drums; Synthesizer
- Years active: 2020–present
- Website: jairussharif.com

Jairus Sharif is a Canadian experimental jazz musician from Calgary, Alberta, whose debut full-length album Water & Tools was released in 2022.

== Early life ==
Sharif grew up in Calgary, raised by a single mother and aunt who were immersed in the city's punk rock scene, and got to know his father, a Black Canadian player of the upright bass, only in the final few months of his life.

== Career ==
Sharif started in music as a hip hop turntablist and DJ, and later played in garage rock and blues bands before discovering avant-garde jazz through exploration of the samples on some of his favourite early hip hop records.

After being exposed to the music of South African saxophonist Dudu Pukwana, he bought an alto saxophone and began to teach himself the instrument; soon afterward, the COVID-19 pandemic struck, during which the synthesizer and drum kit of musician friends he had been jamming with were left in his basement during lockdown, and Sharif began experimenting with playing and self-recording a brand of experimental free jazz mixed with his hip hop and blues influences.

Sharif released the Q4DB (Quest 4 Deep Breath) series of EPs — I Can Learn and Honor, Mould, In the Open and Simple — between July and December 2020, and followed up with the EP Mega Optics in 2021, before releasing Water & Tools in fall 2022 as his full-length debut.

Water & Tools was longlisted for the 2023 Polaris Music Prize.

As of April, 2025, Jairus Sharif has been touring in a new collaboration with the Montréal based composer and musician NPNP(Jackson Darby), with shows in Kelowna and Vancouver, BC.
