= The 20/20 Project =

Canadian hip-hop trio

- Origin: Toronto, Ontario, Canada
- Genre: Canadian hip-hop
- Years active: 2010–2015
- Label: URBNET
- Members: D-Squared; DJ Unknown

The 20/20 Project was a Canadian hip-hop trio from Toronto, Ontario, formed in 2010. The group consisted of MCs D-Squared (real name Dev Sarathy) and producer DJ Unknown (real name Colin Ojah-Maharaj). Their style is old-school hip-hop; their songs, which are mainly produced and mixed by DJ Unknown, focus on wordplay and storytelling.

Their debut EP, Employees of the Year received generally positive reviews, and consistently charted in the top 10 on a number of Campus Radio Stations across Canada. It peaked #1 on Ottawa's CHUO 89.1 hip-hop charts the week ending November 16, 2010.

In 2015, The 20/20 Project released the album Tapes and Crates. The band has been inactive since.

== Discography ==
=== EPs ===
- Employees of the Year EP (2010), Independent
- Tapes and Crates (2015)
