= DJ Charlie B =

Canadian DJ and record producer

- Also known as: Charlie Brown
- Born: Ajay Saxena; Ontario, Canada
- Origin: Ontario, Canada
- Genres: Hip hop; trap
- Occupations: Record producer; songwriter; disc jockey
- Years active: 2011–present

DJ Charlie B is Canadian a disc jockey and record producer from Ontario. DJ Charlie B first gained recognition in 2011 when he released his first single "Reality", which saw him put together a collection of Ontario artists including P. Reign, Belly, Jahvon, and Big Lean. It was released on February 9, 2011. This brought Charlie into the spotlight of the rap industry. He released his debut album Across The Board in 2022 which included features from NorthSideBenji, Roy Woods, Pressa, Duvy, Lil Berete, Haviah Mighty, Smiley and others. In 2022, Charlie B joined Warner Music Canada as A&R Director. His single "30,000 ft" was nominated for a Juno in 2022.

== Discography ==
=== Albums ===
- 2022: Across The Board

=== Singles ===
- 2022: "30'000" (feat. NorthSideBenji) - Music Canada: Certified Gold

== Awards and nominations ==
| Year | Nominee / work | Award | Result |
|---|---|---|---|
| 2022 | "30'000 feat" (feat. NorthSideBenji) | Juno Award for Rap Single of the Year | Nominated |
