= Buck N' Nice =

Canadian hip-hop duo

- Origin: Ottawa, Ontario, Canada
- Genres: hip-hop
- Years active: 2012–present
- Members: SawBuck; DJ So Nice
- Website: http://www.bucknnice.com

Buck N' Nice is a hip-hop duo from Ottawa, Ontario, Canada. The group consists of rapper SawBuck and producer DJ So Nice.

In 2014, they released the album Us Versus Them, at a dual-release show with Flight Distance.

The album was produced by DJ So Nice, and lyrics were written and performed by SawBuck, except for feature appearances. Videos were released for the tracks "Same Old Me" and "So Strong for So Long". The album was well received by Canadian campus radio, making it in the top-10 charts on !earshot, Canada's campus and community radio music charting body.

In 2014, they played the 2014 House of Paint Festival of Urban Arts and Culture in Ottawa. In 2015, they played the Megaphono Music Showcase Festival in Ottawa, the RBC Ottawa Bluesfest, and Canadian Music Week in Toronto.
