= Joey Stylez =

Canadian musical artist

- Born: Joseph Laplante
- Origin: Saskatchewan, Canada
- Genres: Hip hop, pop, country rap
- Occupations: Singer, rapper
- Years active: 2001–present
- Labels: Universal, Stressed Street, Flight Academy Music
- Website: joeystylez.com

Joseph Laplante, stage name Joey Stylez, is a First Nations-Métis Canadian singer and rapper/pop artist.

== Personal life ==
Joey is married to Haida musician and actress Carsen Gray.

Joey Stylez performs annually across Canada at sometimes isolated First Nations Reserves. He visits youth homes and juvenile detention centres. He facilitated workshops with a focus on Native American youth empowerment and confidence building.

=== Tattoos ===
Stylez got his first tattoo when he was seventeen of Chief Sitting Bull. In an interview with Marie Clements' Urban Ink, Stylez noted Sitting Bull as a monumental figure to his people. He said, "I am inspired by his life and strive to one day be a great figure like him, so it's a perfect reminder." He named one tattoo "Chief Joseph". He also has the Indian outlaw logo and "Indian Outlaw" in script on both his forearm and stomach. Centred on the back of his shoulders is the West Coast style eagle with Cree syllabics below that says "a gift and a curse, explaining "the gift is having lots of young impressionable eyes on me, so do not want to steer them on the wrong path, which is the curse.

== Career ==
=== 2001–2006: Mixtapes Snoop Dogg and 50 Cent ===
He opened for both Snoop Dogg and 50 Cent in Saskatoon.

=== 2007–2008: XXL & Living Proof ===
In June 2007 Stylez was on the front page of The StarPhoenix, had a feature in XXL and ranked on CBC's list of the top 25 Canadian MC's of all time. In 2008 his song and video for "Living Proof" reached No. 4 on Much Music's Rap City.

Joey Stylez was featured in The Star Phoenix with his friends Trent Duff and Sean Horse to show off his fashion success and billboard at Idylwyld Drive and 20th Street, downtown Saskatoon.

=== 2009: The Blackstar ===
Stylez's debut studio album The Blackstar was released on November 23, 2009. The title is taken from Joseph's Kookum (grandmother in traditional Plains Cree) name, Christina (LaPlante) Blackstar. Kookum was a traditional Plains Cree woman who never spoke English and practiced all the sacred ceremonies.

The Blackstar earned Stylez three Aboriginal Peoples Choice Music Awards, including Best Music Video for his song "Sugarcane" (2009), Best Pop Album (2010) and Songwriter of the Year (2010). In 2011 Joey received a nomination for Aboriginal Album of the Year for this project.

2013: Feather and Rosary

This album featured such songs as "Jaded Angel" that reached number one on the Indigenous Music Countdown.

2016: Red Makaveli

The album was well received and "See You in Hell" was featured on Taylor Sheridan's Hollywood Movie "Wind River".

2016: #GREYMAGIC

This album won best rap album of 2017 at the Indigenous Music Awards.

2018: The Star Chief

Save Your Soul, from this album was featured on the opening episode of Kevin Costner and Taylor Sheridan's "Yellowstone" television series.

2021: 3 Eye Hip

This multi-genre album appealed to a wide audience and "Indian Girl Driving Me Crazy" won best music video at the Native American Music Awards.

2023: Horse Thieves and Bootleggers

The album introduced Stylez as a "trapbilly" artist that incorporated trap and hillbilly music.

== Movie and Television Song Placements ==
2017: "See You in Hell" was featured on Taylor Sheridan's Hollywood Movie "Wind River"

2021: Save Your Soul, was featured on the opening episode of Kevin Costner and Taylor Sheridan's "Yellowstone" television series.

2022: Stylez collaborated with artist Sten Joddi on "Urban Natives", which was featured on the "Reservation Dogs" television series.

2023: The single "Step" was featured on the gritty television drama "Mayor of Kingstown".

== Awards and nominations ==
Year	Ceremony	Nominated work	Category	Result
2009	Aboriginal Peoples Choice Music Awards	Sugarcane, The Blackstar	Best Music Video	Won
2010	Aboriginal Peoples Choice Music Awards	"Kool Runnin"	Aboriginal Songwriter of the Year	Won
2010	Aboriginal Peoples Choice Music Awards	"The Blackstar"	Best Pop CD	Won
2017	Indigenous Music Awards	"#GREYMAGIC"	Best Rap Album	Won
2022	Native American Music Awards	Indian Girl Driving Me Crazy	Best Pop Video	Won
Year	Ceremony	Nominated work	Category	Result
2010	Aboriginal Peoples Choice Music Awards	"The Blackstar"	Aboriginal Male Entertainer of the Year	Nominated
2010	Aboriginal Peoples Choice Music Awards	"The Blackstar"	Best New Artist	Nominated
2010	Aboriginal Peoples Choice Music Awards	"Kool Runnin"	Single of the Year	Nominated
2010	Canadian Aboriginal Music Awards	"The Blackstar"	Entertainer of the Year	Nominated
2011	Juno	"The Blackstar"	Aboriginal Album of the Year	Nominated
2014	Native American Music Awards	"Feather + Rosary"	Best Pop Album	Nominated
2017	Native American Music Awards	"Urban Nativez" with Sten Joddi	Single of the Year	Nominated
