= Brother Edmund Rice Catholic Secondary School =

High school in Toronto, Ontario, Canada

Location
- 55 Pelham Avenue; Carleton Village, Toronto, Ontario, M6N 1A5; Canada; 43.66774°N 79.45575°W

Information
- School type: Catholic High school
- Motto: In amore Christi Crescere (Grow in the Love of Christ)
- Religious affiliations: Roman Catholic (Congregation of Christian Brothers)
- Founded: 1977 (closed 2001)
- School board: Toronto Catholic District School Board
- Superintendent: Dr. Jim Saraco; Area 5
- Area trustee: Jo-Ann Davis; Ward 9
- School number: 523 / 691208
- Principal: Joseph Clarkson
- Grades: 9-13
- Enrollment: 364 (1998-99)
- Language: English
- Mascot: Dolphin
- Team name: Rice Dolphins
- Public transit access: TTC: North/South: 41 Keele, 168 Symington; West/East: 26 Dupont/4 Annette, 40 Junction, 127 Davenport; Rapid Transit: Dundas West, Jane, Lansdowne, Spadina, St. George
- Parish: St. Joan of Arc
- Website: web.archive.org/web/20010124164200/http://www.brotheredmundricess.com/

Brother Edmund Rice Catholic Secondary School (equally known as Brother Edmund Rice CSS, BERCSS, Brother Edmund Rice, or Rice) is a former publicly funded high school in Toronto, Ontario, Canada managed by the Toronto Catholic District School Board. It was named after Edmund Ignatius Rice, a Roman Catholic missionary and educationalist and the founder of two religious institutes of religious brothers: the Congregation of Christian Brothers and the Presentation Brothers.

The school opened in 1977 and was closed June 30, 2001.

== See also ==
- List of high schools in Ontario
