= Chuckie Akenz =

Canadian rapper

C-A
- Born: Chuckie Nguyen; January 21, 1986 (age 40); Toronto, Ontario, Canada
- Origin: Toronto, Ontario
- Genre: Hip hop
- Occupations: Rapper, song-writer
- Years active: 2001–2009, 2024–present
- Label: N/A

Chuckie Nguyen (born January 21, 1986), better known by his stage name of C-A, and formerly as Chuckie Akenz, is a Canadian rapper of Vietnamese descent. He grew up in the Jane and Finch neighbourhood of Toronto, Ontario, Canada. Chuckie rose to notoriety with the filming of an amateur rap video called "You Got Beef?" The music video was widely viewed on the internet, being both praised and criticized. He is considered one of the first well known Asian hip-hop artists around the world.

Chuckie was featured on two national documentaries talking about his life and how it was growing up as an Asian youth in urban Toronto. Chuckie at this time also had 3 music videos rotated on Much Music as well as several media features. After leaving the music business officially in 2009, Chuckie began pursuing other avenues in his life. However, in 2024, he announced his return to music on his Instagram page sometime in 2025.

== Biography ==
The son of Vietnamese refugees, Chuckie grew up in the Jane and Finch neighbourhood of Toronto. He grew up with his mother, and his father was not present in his childhood after his parents split at an early age. Chuckie found music in his teenage years as an outlet to express his upbringings in the Jane and Finch community. His music expressed a lot of what teenage youth in the area went through during the time and despite the sometimes negative view, it always had a positive message behind it. Chuckie was a member of the Canadian Armed Forces, after his military duties, Chuckie went into law enforcement. In 2024, he announced on his Instagram page that he is returning to music expecting his last album in 2025.

== Discography ==
- 2009 Chuckie A: From The Beginning
- 2009 Chuckie A: Before I Begin
- 2004 21 Clipz: In The Guns We Trust
- 2003 Chuckie Akenz: Twenty One Clipz
- 2002 Chuckie Akenz: The Return To Fame
- 2001 2TRIPLE9 Presents: Street Spitterz

== Singles ==
- 2024 Make My Move
- 2014 Yesterday
- 2013 I Remember.
- 2011 Tonight.
- 2010 Never Stop.
- 2010 When It Rains
- 2010 Everywhere You Go
- 2010 Reality
- 2009 For My People
- 2009 Who You Are
- 2009 Okay
- 2009 Friends Till We Die
- 2009 Like A Love Song
- 2008 Annie
- 2008 Chasing My Dreams
- 2008 Fresh Air
- 2008 Time And Time Again
- 2007 Angels/From The Beginning
- 2007 Uptown/We Cry
- 2007 Music is my Life
- 2006 Going Away
- 2005 That's the Way it Goes
- 2005 This is My Life
- 2005 When I'm Gone
- 2005 Just a Dream
- 2005 Those Days ft Buck
- 2005 To The Top
- 2005 Toy Soldiers Remix
- 2005 Real Homiez ft Burnz, and Buck
- 2005 My Heart
- 2005 Love Hurts
- 2005 I'm Sorry
- 2004 Soldier
- 2004 You Got Beef?
- 2002 Don't Worry

== Music videos ==
- 2011 Reality
- 2008 Love Hurts (Feat. Christopher Charles)
- 2007 Angels/From The Beginning
- 2007 Uptown/We Cry
- 2007 Music is my Life
- 2006 Going Away
- 2005 What's Life?
- 2005 That's the Way it Goes
- 2005 This is My Life
- 2005 When I'm Gone
- 2005 Just a Dream
- 2005 Those Days
- 2005 Toy Soldiers Remix
- 2005 Real Homiez
- 2005 My Heart
- 2005 Love Hurts
- 2005 I'm Sorry
- 2004 Soldier
- 2004 You Got Beef?
- 2002 Don't Worry
