= Kwajo Cinqo =

- Born: Kwajo Boateng; Vancouver, British Columbia, Canada
- Origin: Toronto, Ontario, Canada
- Genres: Hip hop
- Occupations: Rapper, CEO, producer, songwriter
- Years active: 1992-Present
- Labels: G7 Records Inc. (2004-Present); 7 Bills Entertainment Inc. (1996-2003); Groove-A-Lot Records (1992-1996)
- Formerly of: Ghetto Concept
- Website: www.g7records.com

Kwajo "Cinqo" Boateng—known by stage name Kwajo Cinqo—is an artist, producer, CEO and member of two-time Juno Award-winning hip-hop group Ghetto Concept. Initially beginning his career in 1992 alongside Dolo (Lowell Frazer). Kwajo is now the president and CEO of Global 7 Entertainment Inc. (G7). He is also an artist/producer under G7 Records—a subsidiary of Global 7 Entertainment Inc.

== Career ==
Prior to founding Global 7 Entertainment in 2010, Kwajo founded 7Bills Entertainment in 1996. The company showcased artists such as Angel Duss, Blacks, and Ray Smoove and released the albums Ghetto Concept (1998) and Ghetto Concept Presents...7Bills All-Stars: Da Album (2002). Both compilations featured collaborations with artists including Snow, Maestro, Kardinal Official, Red-1, Ironside, and Sticky Fingaz—American rapper, actor and member of hip-hop group Onyx.

In 2004, Kwajo co-scored the Soul Plane movie soundtrack as a producer and writer for singles "Full Grown", "Kitty Cat", "Strobelight", "Yourz Iz Mine", and "Here We Go Again". The soundtrack also featured singles by Snoop Dogg, R. Kelly, Nelly, and Lil Scrappy. Pursuing other aspects of the entertainment industry, Kwajo has also been a part of Playboy TV’s Red & Meth: How to Throw A Party At The PlayBoy Mansion (2005), starring rappers Redman and Method Man. He has worked alongside Run-DMC, Brand Nubian, and Eminem and executive produced Reema Major's I Am Legend mixtape (2011) and JJ Money's Time Is Money mixtape (2011).

On March 22, 2011, Kwajo reunited with fellow group member Dolo of Ghetto Concept to perform at CBC's Hip-Hop Summit which featured other legendary Canadian hip-hop artists including Michie Mee, K-Os, Dream Warriors, and Maestro. Kwajo also appeared in Love, Props and the T.Dot—a hip-hop documentary hosted by Dwight Drummond of CBC Toronto, where he was recognized for his significant contributions to Canadian hip hop.

== Gold Cedi Goldfields Ltd. ==
With music at the core of Kwajo's longstanding career, he has propelled his career in the corporate sector with Gold Cedi Goldfields Ltd. (GCG)—a subsidiary of Ashanti Minerals Group. The company is headquartered in Toronto but is also stationed in British Columbia, and internationally in Ghana, Kwajo's country of ethnicity. GCG has provided employment and support for Ghanaian locals, and has administered scholarship funding for Ghanaian students to further their education in Canada.

== Music ==
=== Discography ===
Ghetto Concept

- "Certified" (1993) - Single
- "E-Z on Tha Motion" (1994) - Single
- "Much Love" (1996) - Single
- Ghetto Concept (1998) - Album
- Ghetto Concept Presents...7Bills All-Stars: Da Album (2002)
- "Here We Go Again" feat. Lil' Flip (2004) - Single

Kwajo Cinqo

- Corporate Hustle (2011)

=== Awards ===
- 1995: Juno Award for Rap Recording of the Year — "Certified" - Ghetto Concept
- 1996: Juno Award for Rap Recording of the Year — "EZ On Tha Motion" - Ghetto Concept
- 2000: Canadian Gold Certification — "Too Much" - Ghetto Concept/Baby Blue Soundcrew
