= Yvon Krevé =

- Also known as: Von Von le Vet
- Born: Henry Green-Dupré; Enoch, Alberta, Canada
- Genres: Hip hop
- Occupations: Rapper; singer

Henry Green-Dupré, known by his stage names of Yvon Krevé and Von Von le Vet, is a French Canadian hip hop artist of Haitian origin. Krevé was rose to notice following collaborations with the duo Sans Pression. His 2000 debut, L'accent grave, topped the Quebec sales charts and was nominated for an ADISQ hip-hop award in 2001, and won best francophone album at the Canadian Music Awards. and in 2009 was described in the newspaper La Presse as one of the five albums that had defined Quebec rap. A single from that album, "Yvon Krevé", reached number one on the countdown programme for Canada's leading francophone music video channel (Décompte MusiquePlus). The name is a play on words: while Yvon is a not-uncommon first name, it matches the informal Quebec French pronunciation of ils vont (they will). Thus the full name sounds like ils vont crever, or "they will die".

== Discography ==
- 6 June 2000: L'accent grave
- 18 March 2003: Quand j'rap pas
- 25 October 2005: Von Von Le vet

== See also ==
- (in French) Rap québécois, on French Wikipedia
