= Wordburglar =

- Also known as: SJ the Wordburglar, Wordburg, Burg, Burgie
- Born: Sean Jordan; Halifax, Nova Scotia
- Origin: Halifax, Nova Scotia, Canada
- Genres: Hip-hop, alternative hip hop, nerdcore
- Occupation: Rapper
- Years active: 2001-present
- Labels: Hand'Solo Records, Backburner, Urbnet Records
- Website: wordburglar.com

Sean Jordan, better known by his stage name Wordburglar, is a Canadian alternative hip hop artist from Halifax, Nova Scotia, now based in Toronto. His style is best described as upbeat and charismatic with an emphasis on wordplay and humour. He primarily works with his crews Backburner and Props Dept for all aspects of his music creation, including production, cuts, mixing, mastering and guest vocals.

== Biography ==
Born as Sean Jordan, SJ the Wordburglar began his rap career as a member of The Dregs of Society using the name SJ or "Essjae". Their biggest hit was a song called "Stuart" about one of their friends. It appears as a bonus cut on Wordburglar's self-titled debut. After the Dregs broke up, Wordburglar started a solo career as SJ, adopting the additional "the Wordburglar" upon teaming up with Beatmason for his first major single, "Wordburglar." The song was central to his self-released debut (Backburner) and was also included on the compilation Bassments of Badmen: Volume 2 (Hand'Solo Records) later that year. The song was also made into an animated video, which is featured on Jasmatuph's Preserving Efforts DVD video collection, and has been remixed by a number of different producers. Signing to Hand'Solo Records, Wordburglar followed his debut CD with a vinyl EP that collected songs from that album and his at-that-time upcoming Burglaritis with a few exclusives in 2005 and Burglaritis in 2006. Both the vinyl EP and Burglaritis feature the song "Breeze," a duet with Quannum Projects member Pigeon John.

== Solo career ==
Following Burglaritis in 2006, Wordburglar released Burgie’s Basement initially as a tour-only CD and eventually through Toronto hip-hop label Urbnet Records in 2009. After completing the group album Heatwave with the Backburner Crew in 2011 and extensive touring, Wordburglar released his 3rd official studio album titled 3rdburglar in 2012.

In 2013 he started his own independent label for his solo work and released Welcome To Cobra Island (2013), Rapplicable Skills (2015), Rhyme Your Business (2018), SpaceVerse (2019), Burgonomic (2022), The MacGuffin Device (2023), The Spinner Rack (2023) and Wordburglar Rhymes With Comics #1 (2025).

In 2009, Wordburglar co-founded the long-running "$5 Rap Show" in Toronto with long-time music partner More Or Les. He has released a series of limited edition vinyl singles with Halifax's Black Buffalo Records and continues to work with underground affiliates Hand'Solo Records, Urbnet, Backburner Crew and The Props Dept.

== Collaborations ==
In addition to releasing three full-length albums with Backburner Crew ("Heatwave", "Eclipse" & "Continuum"), Wordburglar has collaborated with fellow Canadian hip-hop artists Jorun Bombay, Buck 65 and Moka Only, American rappers Mega Ran, Riddlore, Kool Keith and Esoteric of Czarface, as well as the rock band The Cybertronic Spree.

=== Work outside of hip hop ===
Wordburglar is a writer and actor. He is the voice of Starscope on the animated series Transformers: BotBots.

Wordburglar is also a comic book creator of the action-comedy series Snakor's Pizza and The Last Paper Route under his given name.

== Discography ==
=== Studio albums ===
- SJ the Wordburglar (2003)
- Burglaritis (2006)
- Burgie's Basement (2009)
- 3rdburglar (2012)
- Welcome to Cobra Island (2013)
- Rapplicable Skills (2015)
- Rhyme Your Business (2018)
- SpaceVerse (2019)
- Burgonomic (2022)
- The Spinner Rack EP (2023)

=== Compilation albums ===
- The MacGuffin Device (2023)
- Wordburglar Rhymes With Comics #1 (2025)

=== Extended plays ===
- If It Rhymes It's Real (2017)
- The Mos Eisley Rap Show (2019)

=== Vinyl singles ===
- Channel Halifax b/w Cream of Wheat (2017)
- NARC Hi-Score b/w Yobosayo (2018)
- Damage Control b/w Space Defense Team featuring Esoteric of Czarface, Kool Keith & Mega Ran (2019)
