= Jesse Dangerously =

- Jesse in Ottawa, November 2008

Background information
- Also known as: Jesse D.; J.D.; Little Girl Toast; Bad DJ Budget Cuts
- Born: Jesse Alexander McDonald; October 19, 1979
- Origin: Halifax, Nova Scotia, Canada
- Genre: Alternative hip-hop
- Instruments: Vocals; sampler; drums; ukulele; theremin
- Years active: 1996-present
- Labels: Hand'Solo Records; Coax Records
- Member of: Backburner
- Formerly of: The Sentinels; Imaginary Friends; The Library Steps; Danger Grove
- Website: http://dangerously.ca/

Jesse Alexander McDonald (born October 19, 1979), better known by their stage name Jesse Dangerously, is an alternative hip-hop artist from Halifax, Nova Scotia and operating out of Ottawa, Ontario. Dangerously has released solo projects, provided guest vocals for other local artists, hosted a weekly radio show, written a weekly column, and produced beats for other musicians. They are a member of the Backburner collective.

== Career ==
Their career began in 1996 with the release of the solo album B.R.E.A.K. They released the album Eastern Canadian World Tour in 2002, followed by How to Express Your Dissenting Political Viewpoint Through Origami in 2004, Inter Alia in 2005, and Verba Volant in 2007.

From June 2004 until May 2007, Dangerously hosted The Pavement, a weekly hip hop show on CKDU 88.1 FM that was handed down to them from Buck 65 and Skratch Bastid. They have guest lectured at Saint Mary's University on the topic of gender issues in rap music and popular culture, and from January 2006 until October 2007, they penned a weekly column on regional hip-hop for The Daily News of Halifax.

Jesse released their sixth solo album Humble & Brilliant in 2011. In 2018, they released two collaborative albums, Rap Dad, Real Dad with producer Ambition under the name The Library Steps, and Want, For Nothing with producer Lizard Grove as Danger Grove.

== Musical style ==
Rapper MC Chris has referred to Dangerously as a nerdcore hip hop artist, saying the following:

"The truth is I'm kicking every other rapper like me's ass up and down the boardwalk. I only like one and will say his name quite happily. Jesse Dangerously. He's good. The rest suck. That’s hard to say and i haven't said it before because some of these people are my fans, some are my friends."

== Personal life ==
McDonald is non-binary and uses both they/them and he/him pronouns.

== Discography ==
=== Solo ===
- B.R.E.A.K. (1996)
- Eastern Canadian World Tour 2002 (2002)
- How to Express Your Dissenting Political Viewpoint Through Origami (2004)
- Inter Alia (2005)
- Verba Volant (2007)
- Humble & Brilliant (2011)

=== Collaborations ===
- The Sentinels - The Lying City, EP (1998)
- Imaginary Friends - The ImF Ride b/w Even Exist (As In, "We Don't..."), 7" (2004)
- The Library Steps - Rap Dad, Real Dad, LP (2018) (with Ambition)
- Danger Grove - Want, For Nothing, LP (2018) (with Lizard Grove)
