= Shy'm discography =

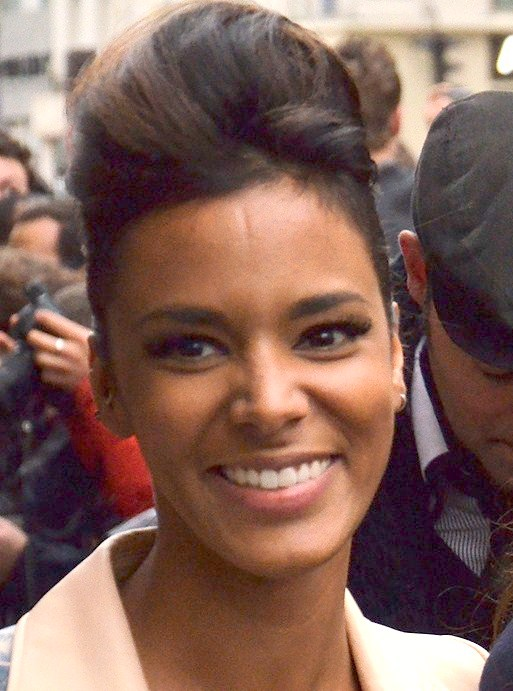
- Shy'm at a concert in Bercy, 2013.
- Studio albums: 7
- Compilation albums: 2
- Singles: 39

The discography of French recording artist Shy'm consists of seven studio albums, two compilation albums, and 35 singles. All six of her studio albums have reached the top ten position on France; Caméléon, released in 2012, managed to reach number one. In the same week that Caméléon was released, she released her only compilation album to date, L'intégrale (which is a box set of her first three albums). She has sold over 1,500,000 albums in France.

== Albums ==
=== Studio albums ===
List of studio albums, with selected chart positions, sales figures and certifications
Title	Album details	Peak chart positions					Certifications (SNEP)	Sales
Title	Album details	FRA	FRA DL	BEL (Wa)	SWI	EUR	Certifications (SNEP)	Sales
Mes Fantaisies	Released: 30 October 2006; Label: K-Pone; Formats: CD, digital download	6	7	18	49	11	Platinum	300,000
Reflets	Released: 26 September 2008; Label: K-Pone; Formats: CD, digital download	4	5	13	55	9	Gold	100,000
Prendre l'air	Released: 14 June 2010; Label: K-Pone, Warner Music France; Formats: CD, digital download	6	5	29	78	18	3× Platinum	350,000
Caméléon	Released: 25 June 2012; Label: K-Pone, Warner Music France; Formats: CD, digital download	1	2	3	26	—	3× Platinum	300,000
Solitaire	Released: 24 November 2014; Label: Warner Music France; Formats: CD, digital download	8	4	17	30	—	Platinum	100,000
Héros	Released: 1 September 2017; Label: Warner Music France; Formats: CD, digital download	6	—	9	59	—		30,000
Agapé	Released: 26 April 2019; Label: Warner Music France; Formats: CD, digital download	20	—	26	93	—		
"–" denotes items which were not released in that country or failed to chart.

=== Compilation albums ===
List of studio albums, with selected chart positions, sales figures and certifications
Title	Album details	Peak chart positions		Certifications	Sales
Title	Album details	FR	BEL (Wa)	Certifications	Sales
L'intégrale	Released: 25 June 2012; Label: K-Pone, Warner Music France; Formats: Boxset	65	42		15,000
À nos dix ans	Released: 9 October 2015; Label: Warner Music France; Formats: 2×CD, download	4	7	Gold	50,000
"–" denotes items which were not released in that country or failed to chart.

== Singles ==
=== As lead artist ===
List of singles, with selected chart positions
Single	Year	Peak chart positions							Album
Single	Year	FRA	FRA DL	BEL (Wa)	BEL (Wa) Ultratip	SWI	QUÉ	EUR	Album
"Femme de couleur"	2006	5	9	6	—	30	—	10	Mes fantaisies
"Victoire"	2006	4	7	4	—	34	1	3	Mes fantaisies
"T'es parti"	2007	—	12	—	9	—	—	—	Mes fantaisies
"Oublie-moi"	2007	14	16	—	10	—	2	—	Mes fantaisies
"Rêves d'enfants"	2007	—	19	—	—	—	—	—	Mes fantaisies
"La première fois"	2008	147	15	15	—	—	—	—	Reflets
"Si tu savais"	2008	2	19	40	—	91	12	5	Reflets
"Step Back" (feat. Odessa Thornhill)	2009	—	—	—	—	—	—	—	Reflets
"Je sais"	2010	70	3	25	—	68	—	—	Prendre l'air
"Je suis moi"	2010	127	23	—	9	—	—	—	Prendre l'air
"Prendre l'air"	2010	21	19	—	17	—	—	—	Prendre l'air
"Tourne"	2011	35	33	—	15	—	—	—	Prendre l'air
"En apesanteur"	2011	32	32	28	—	—	—	—	Prendre l'air
"Et alors !"	2012	2	1	4	—	58	—	—	Caméléon
"On se fout de nous"	2012	24	24	13	—	—	—	—	Caméléon
"Et si"	2012	51	60	—	6	—	—	—	Caméléon
"White Christmas" feat Michael Bublé	2012	29	—	—	—	—	—	—	Caméléon
"Caméléon"	2013	124	—	—	—	—	—	—	Caméléon
"Contrôle"	2013	—	—	—	11	—	—	—	Caméléon
"La malice"	2014	4	—	34	—	—	—	—	Solitaire
"L'effet de serre"	2014	29	—	48	—	—	—	—	Solitaire
"On s'en va"	2015	174	—	—	—	—	—	—	Solitaire
"Silhouette"	2015	-	—	—	31	—	—	—	Solitaire
"Il faut vivre"	2015	128	—	—	—	—	—	—	À nos dix ans
"Tandem"	2015	171	—	—	17	—	—	—	À nos dix ans
"Mayday" (featuring Kid Ink)	2017	42	—	—	—	—	—	—	Héros
"Si tu m'aimes encore"	2017	34	—	—	—	—	—	—	Héros
"Madinina"	2018	—	—	—	—	—	—	—	Héros
"La Go"	2018	180	—	—	—	—	—	—	Agapé
"Absolem"	2019	69	—	—	—	—	—	—	Agapé
"Puerto Rico"	2019	55	—	—	—	—	—	—	Agapé
"Amiants"	2019	42	—	—	—	—	—	—	Agapé
"Olé Olé"	2019	—	—	—	—	—	—	—	Agapé
"Sourire"	2019	—	—	—	—	—	—	—	Agapé
"Boy"	2020	39	—	—	—	—	—	—	N/A
"Ensemble"	2020	71	—	—	—	—	—	—	N/A
"Tadada Tututu"	2021	-	—	—	—	—	—	—	N/A
"Sunset Pyromane"	2021	-	—	—	—	—	—	—	N/A
"Elle danse encore"	2022	-	—	—	—	—	—	—	N/A
"–" denotes items which were not released in that country or failed to chart.

=== Collaborations ===
List of singles, with selected chart positions
Single	Year	Peak chart positions						Album
Single	Year	FRA	FRA DL	BEL (Wa)	SWI	QUÉ	EUR	Album
"Histoires de Luv" (K.Maro featuring Shy'm)	2005	6	—	11	15	1	—	Million Dollar Boy (K.Maro album)
"Famille" (As part of Collégiale)	2012	49	—	—	—	—	—	Génération Goldman
"Vivre ou survivre"	2016	90	—	—	—	—	—	Balavoine(s) (compilation by various artists)
"Nous deux" (Lorenzo feat. Shy'm)	2019	33	—	—	—	—	—	Sex in the City (Lorenzo album)
"Givré" (Vartang feat. Shy'm)	2023	—	—	—	—	—	—	N/A
"–" denotes items which were not released in that country or failed to chart.
