= K.Pone.Inc =

Music entertainment group

KPoneInc also known as KPoneInc Music Group is a music entertainment group established in 2002 by Cyril Kamar better known by his stage name as K.Maro.

KPoneInc. Music Group goes into music production, promotion and distribution and has its own record label K.Pone.Inc record label. The music group has signed a national distribution agreement for its entire catalogue and record label releases with Warner Music.

KPoneInc has its own "KPoneInc" record label, that has signed the artists Ale Dee, Imposs, Shy'm and Vaï.

== Ale Dee ==
Ale Dee (real name Alexandre Duhaime) is a Trois-Rivières Quebec rapper. He has released three albums: Mine de rien (2006), Pour le love pis l'cash (2008) and Entre la mine et l'papier (2010)

== Imposs ==
Imposs (real name S. Rimsky Salgado) is a Canadian rapper of Haitian origin based in Montreal Quebec. Before becoming a solo artist, he was part of Muzion, one of the well-known hip hop bands of Quebec. First album release with K.Pone was in 2008.

== K.Maro ==
K.Maro (real name Cyril Kamar) is a Canadian hip hop and R&B singer-songwriter and producer of Lebanese origin. He raps in French and in English. He is founder and CEO of KPoneInc Music Group and KPoneInc record label.

== Shy'm ==
Shy'm (real name Tamara Marthe) is a French R&B singer. She released her debut album, Mes Fantaisies, in 2006 which rose to No. 5 in the French chart. To date, four songs from the album have been released as singles, all of which charted in the top 10 in France.

== Vaï ==
Vaï (real name Adil Takhssait) is a Canadian (Quebec) rap and hip-hop musician of Moroccan origin. He was earlier part of Les Messagers du Son (LMDS) as Mélo (Melopsy) alongside K.Maro (stage name Lyrik) in LMDS).
