= L'intégrale =

L'Intégrale

Box set by Shy'm
- Released: 25 June 2012
- Recorded: 2006–2011
- Genre: Pop, R&B, dance-pop
- Label: Warner Music France
- Producer: Cyril Kamar, Louis Côté

Shy'm chronology
Caméléon (2012)	L'Intégrale (2012)

L'Intégrale (The whole thing) is a box set by French singer Shy'm. Released in France and Belgium on 25 June 2012 by Warner Music France to celebrate the release of Shy'm's fourth album, Caméléon, it contains Shy'm's first three studio albums and a DVD featuring behind the scenes footage alongside the music videos for some of her biggest hits, such as "Je sais" and "Femme de couleur".

== Production ==
The box set includes the following albums:

- Mes fantaisies (2006)
- Reflets (2008)
- Prendre l'air (2010)

== Chart performance ==
The box set debuted at No. 65 on the French chart on the same week Caméléon debuted at No. 1. It dropped out of the French top 200 after three weeks, before spending four more weeks in the top 200 in the run up to Christmas 2012, buoyed by Christmas sales. The box set was more successful in Belgium, where it débuted at No. 42 on the Wallonian chart and spent sixteen weeks top 200.

== Track listing ==
Mes fantaisies (Disc 1)

No.	Title	Writer(s)	Producer(s)	Length
1.	"Shy'm"	Cyril Kamar, Louis Côté	Cyril Kamar, Louis Côté	3:39
2.	"Femme de couleur"	Cyril Kamar, Louis Côté	Cyril Kamar, Louis Côté	3:36
3.	"Ta Lady"	Cyril Kamar, Louis Côté	Cyril Kamar, Louis Côté	4:01
4.	"Sur les dancefloors"	Cyril Kamar, Louis Côté	Cyril Kamar, Louis Côté	3:42
5.	"Oublie-moi"	Cyril Kamar, Louis Côté	Cyril Kamar, Louis Côté	3:03
6.	"Pour vous"	Cyril Kamar, Louis Côté	Cyril Kamar, Louis Côté	3:27
7.	"Le Blues de toi"	Cyril Kamar, Louis Côté	Cyril Kamar, Louis Côté	4:12
8.	"Mes fantaisies"	Cyril Kamar, Louis Côté	Cyril Kamar, Louis Côté	3:48
9.	"T'es parti"	Cyril Kamar, Louis Côté	Cyril Kamar, Louis Côté	3:30
10.	"Tu comprendras"	Cyril Kamar, Louis Côté	Cyril Kamar, Louis Côté	3:43
11.	"Rêves d'enfants"	Cyril Kamar, Louis Côté	Cyril Kamar, Louis Côté	3:51
12.	"Victoire"	Cyril Kamar, Louis Côté	Cyril Kamar, Louis Côté	3:47
13.	"Femme de couleur" (Remix - feat. Neïman)	Cyril Kamar, Louis Côté	Cyril Kamar, Louis Côté	3:55
14.	"Victoire" (Remix)	Cyril Kamar, Louis Côté	Cyril Kamar, Louis Côté	3:28
Total length:				51:42

Reflets (Disc 2)

No.	Title	Writer(s)	Producer(s)	Length
1.	"La première fois"	Cyril Kamar	Cyril Kamar, Louis Côté	3:24
2.	"Step Back" (feat. Odessa Thornhill)	Cyril Kamar	Cyril Kamar, Louis Côté	3:23
3.	"Tout est dis"	Cyril Kamar	Cyril Kamar, Louis Côté	3:15
4.	"Faut recommencer"	Cyril Kamar	Cyril Kamar, Louis Côté	4:01
5.	"Garde tout"	Cyril Kamar	Cyril Kamar, Louis Côté	4:06
6.	"Ma peur"	Cyril Kamar	Cyril Kamar, Louis Côté	3:42
7.	"Si tu savais"	Cyril Kamar	Cyril Kamar, Louis Côté	3:23
8.	"Je prends sur moi"	Cyril Kamar	Cyril Kamar, Louis Côté	3:06
9.	"Nulle part ailleurs"	Cyril Kamar	Cyril Kamar, Louis Côté	3:46
10.	"L'Unique"	Tamara Marthe, Cyril Kamar	Cyril Kamar, Louis Côté	3:20
11.	"Pas pour moi"	Cyril Kamar	Cyril Kamar, Louis Côté	3:53
12.	"À l’abri" (feat. K.Maro)	Cyril Kamar	Cyril Kamar, Louis Côté	3:46
13.	"On n'a pas tout notre temps"	Cyril Kamar	Cyril Kamar, Louis Côté	4:05
14.	"La première fois" (Remix)	Cyril Kamar	Cyril Kamar, Louis Côté	4:03
15.	"Donner"	Cyril Kamar	Cyril Kamar, Louis Côté	4:20
Total length:				55:35

Prendre l'air (Disc 3)

No.	Title	Writer(s)	Producer(s)	Length
1.	"Je sais"	Cyril Kamar	Cyril Kamar, Louis Côté	2:41
2.	"Prendre l'air"	Cyril Kamar	Cyril Kamar, Louis Côté	3:33
3.	"Je suis moi"	Cyril Kamar	Cyril Kamar, Louis Côté	3:21
4.	"Tourne"	Cyril Kamar	Cyril Kamar, Louis Côté	3:22
5.	"Ne pars pas"	Cyril Kamar	Cyril Kamar, Louis Côté	3:47
6.	"J'entends encore les mots"	Cyril Kamar	Cyril Kamar, Louis Côté	3:33
7.	"En apesanteur"	Cyril Kamar	Cyril Kamar, Louis Côté	3:50
8.	"Mauvaises nouvelles"	Cyril Kamar	Cyril Kamar, Louis Côté	3:47
9.	"Déjà vu"	Cyril Kamar	Cyril Kamar, Louis Côté	3:04
10.	"Elle danse"	Cyril Kamar	Cyril Kamar, Louis Côté	3:46
11.	"Loin derrière"	Cyril Kamar	Cyril Kamar, Louis Côté	3:30
12.	"Petit Tom"	Cyril Kamar	Cyril Kamar, Louis Côté	3:57
13.	"Prendre l'air" (Acoustic)	Cyril Kamar	Cyril Kamar, Louis Côté	3:11
14.	"Je sais" (Acoustic)	Cyril Kamar	Cyril Kamar, Louis Côté	2:38
15.	"Femme de couleur" (Acoustic)	Cyril Kamar	Cyril Kamar, Louis Côté	2:55
16.	"Tourne" (Acoustic)	Cyril Kamar	Cyril Kamar, Louis Côté	3:08
17.	"En apesanteur" (Reprise 2011)	Gioacchino Maurici, Calogero, Alana Filippi	Cyril Kamar, Louis Côté	3:40
18.	"Je sais" (Jérémy Hills Radio Mix)	Cyril Kamar	Cyril Kamar, Louis Côté, Jérémy Hills	2:37
19.	"Je suis moi" (Jérémy Hills Radio Mix)	Cyril Kamar	Cyril Kamar, Louis Côté, Jérémy Hills	2:56
20.	"Tourne" (Radio Edit)	Cyril Kamar	Cyril Kamar, Louis Côté	3:28
Total length:				67:44

Bonus DVD (Disc 4)

No.	Title	Length
1.	"Gallery photos"
2.	"Intimite, unreleased Shy'm documentary"
3.	"Femme de couleur (music video)"
4.	"Oublie-moi (music video)"
5.	"Oublie-moi (making of music video)"
6.	"Oublie-moi (dance version music video)"
7.	"T'es parti (music video)"
8.	"T'es parti (official music video)"
9.	"Victoire (music video)"
10.	"La première fois (making of music video)"
11.	"La première fois (music video)"
12.	"Christmas 2011 interview"
13.	"Je sais (music video)"
14.	"Je suis moi (music video)"
15.	"Making of acoustic songs"
16.	"Prendre l'air (music video)"
17.	"Tourne (music video)"

== Charts ==
Year (2012)	Peak position
Belgium (Ultratop 40 Wallonia)	42
France (SNEP)	65
