= On se fout de nous =

Single by Shy'm

from the album Caméléon
- Released: 27 August 2012
- Genre: Pop
- Length: 3:30
- Label: Warner Music France
- Songwriter: Louis Côté
- Producers: Cyril Kamar, Louis Côté

Shy'm singles chronology
"Et alors !" (2012)	"On se fout de nous" (2012)	"Et si" (2012)

"On se fout de nous" is a song by French popstar Shy'm, from her fourth album Caméléon. It was released as the second single from the album on August 27, 2012. "On se fout de nous" is an uptempo pop song, written and produced by Louis Côté and Cyril Kamar. It features prominent synths, guitar and piano, and is considered a more mature song than previous single "Et alors !". The song's title translates as "They Don't Care About Us", and lyrically it speaks of melancholy and tiring of the mundane.

The song was a moderate commercial success, peaking at #24 on the official French singles chart and #13 on the Belgian singles chart.

== Music video ==
The music video for the song was shot in studio and focused on Shy'm and a male lover (played by Daniel Bamdad). Both people in the video are partially unclothed, and spend the video caressing each other, whilst looking melancholic. Later in the video there is choreography between the duo, symbolising the struggle between their love and hate for each other. The scenes soon change, and the couple are shown doing their choreo in rain, and then in clouds of flour, while still in the same studio.

The video was released to YouTube on August 22, 2012. It racked up four million views but received a mixed reception. There was much media attention surrounding the video in France due to the sexual nature of the video, and the controversy lead to comments on the video on YouTube being disabled.

== Chart performance ==
The song débuted at #68 on the French singles chart for the week ending August 25, 2012. The next week, it rose to #54, and on its ninth week on chart, reached its peak of #24. The song spent twelve weeks in the top 40. In Belgium, it was more successful, peaking at #13 and making Caméléon the first Shy'm album to yield multiple top 20 hits in the country since her début, Mes Fantaisies.

== Charts ==
Chart (2012)	Peak position
Belgium (Ultratop 40 Wallonia)	13
France (SNEP)	24
