= Si tu savais =

2008 song by Shy'm

Single by Shy’m

from the album Reflets
- Released: 17 November 2008
- Genre: Pop, R&B
- Length: 3:23
- Label: Warner Music France
- Songwriter: Louis Côté
- Producers: Cyril Kamar, Louis Côté

Shy’m singles chronology
"La première fois" (2008)	"Si tu savais" (2008)	"Step Back (feat. Odessa Thornhill)" (2009)

"Si tu savais" is a song by French singer Shy'm, from her second album Reflets. It was released on 17 November 2008 as the second single from the album. Written and produced by Louis Côté and Cyril Kamar, "Si tu savais" is a pop and R&B song, the song's music video has blocked by WMG on YouTube.

== Chart performance ==
The song became one of Shy'm's best performing singles, both in France, "Si tu savais" as her highest-peaking single, reaching #2. In Wallonia, started in the Ultratip, reaching #1 and then in the Ultratop 40 singles, reaching #40. In Switzerland since "Si tu savais", despite only peaking at #91.

== Charts ==
Chart (2009)	Peak position
Belgium (Ultratop 50 Wallonia)	40
France (SNEP)	2
Switzerland (Schweizer Hitparade)	91
