= Maxime Rémillard =

Canadian businessman (born 1975)

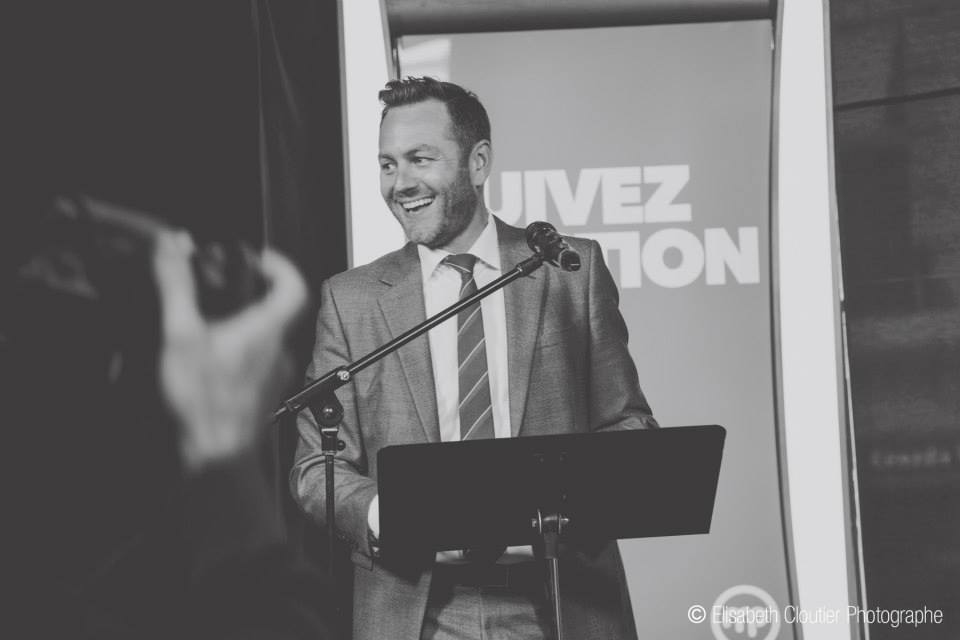
- Rémillard at an event in 2015
- Born: January 17, 1975 (age 51); Greenfield Park, Quebec, Canada
- Education: University of Ottawa
- Occupation: Business man

Maxime Rémillard is a Canadian businessman born on January 17, 1975, in Greenfield Park, Quebec. He is the president of both Remcorp, a leading Canadian private investment firm and Remstar Media, an entertainment and content delivery company.

== Biography ==
After graduating with a Bachelor of Arts from the University of Ottawa and studying production at the University of Southern California, Rémillard founded Remstar in 1997, a film production and distribution company. Under the label, he produced Denis Villeneuve’s film Polytechnique, which won the Genie Award for Best Canadian Film in 2010, Head in the Clouds starring Charlize Theron and Mesrine: Killer Instinct starring Vincent Cassel. As a distributor, he acquired the rights for Dallas Buyers Club by Jean-Marc Vallée and Barry Jenkin’s Moonlight, which won the Oscar for Best Film in 2017.

== Remcorp ==
Over the years, he put his influence and ideas at the service of diversification by founding the investment company Remcorp. His company, whose team has cumulatively completed more than $3B in transactions in recent years, is increasing investments with well-established companies in a wide range of sectors including technology, transportation services, real estate and agro-technology. Remcorp also works in the media industry with its company Remstar Media, owner of the specialty channels MAX and ELLE Fictions.

== Philanthropy ==
Rémillard serves on the board of directors of the Fondation du Musée Pointe-à-Callière. For four years, he has partnered with the Mira Foundation. His family helped create the Yosh Taguchi Chair for Urological Cancer Research at McGill University. The Rémillard family also supports and sponsors Centraide, the Jewish General Hospital Foundation and La Maison des Petits Tournesols.

== Personal life ==
Rémillard was in a relationship with actress Karine Vanasse from 2006 to 2014.
