= Vaï =

Canadian Moroccan singer

- Born: Adil Takhssait; 24 April 1979 (age 47); France
- Origin: Montreal, Quebec
- Genres: hip hop
- Occupations: Singer, rapper
- Instrument: vocals
- Years active: 1994–present
- Label: K.Pone Inc Music Group

Adil Takhssait (born 24 April, 1979, in Paris), better known by his stage names Vaï, formerly Mélo or Mélopsy, is a Canadian rapper of Moroccan origin. He was born in France to a Moroccan family and immigrated to Canada in 1993, and established himself in Montreal. He is an author, composer and performer. He is signed to K.Pone.Inc record label.

== In LMDS ==
Adil Takhssait formed in 1994 his first band LMDS abbreviation of Les Messagers Du Son with his classmate and friend Cyril Kamar (later on K'Maro). Adil took the name "Mélo" (Mélopsy) whereas Cyril Kamar took the name Lyrik.

LMDS, Les Messagers du Son, has had two successful albums, Les Messagers du Son in 1997 and Il Faudrait Leur Dire in 1999. The self-titled debut album of LMDS Les Messagers du Son issued in 1997 achieved top positions in the Quebec charts and the duo appeared at Les FrancoFolies de Montréal music festival in 1999. They followed that by "Il faudrait leur dire" and a compilation released in France, where both had resided for some time.

After the break-up of the group in 2001, both Adil Takhssait and Cyril Kamar have continued with solo careers

== Vaï, as a solo act ==
Soon after the break-up, Adil issued his solo breakthrough album Street Life through THC Musique with the title track single coming from the album. The song "Street Life" featured Zaho and sampled on "Sweet Dreams (Are Made of This)" from Eurythmics.

The single "Tous Héros" about violence and boxing gained cult status amongst fans. The song sampled on James Brown hit "It's a Man's Man's Man's World".

His follow-up album Ma raison in 2008 included the single "Sur ma vie" and the music video featured in the daily Top 5 chart in Canadian French language cable television specialty channel MusiMax

He was also featured in Zoxea's song "Reste calme" and in DJ Blast's "Un homme à part".

His "Visages tristes" is about the Arab-Israeli conflict using samplings from the soundtrack of Schindler's List.

== Personal life ==
Vaï is married to a professional photographer and has a son with her. During his hiatus from rapping, he opened a burger business under the name Vaï Burger in Laval and in Ville Saint-Laurent, Quebec.

== Albums & EPs ==
=== With LMDS ===
- 1997: Les Messagers du Son
- 1999: Il Faudrait Leur Dire

=== As solo act ===
Title and details	Details
Street Life: Type: Album; Date released: 2007	Track listing: Street Life; 1. "Intro gloire à l'album"; 2. "Pour Ceux"; 3. "Zahri" feat. Freeman (Krhyme Le Roi); 4. "J moins trois"; 5. "Klebs"; 6. "Street Life"; 7. "Vecu"; 8. "Comme un fanfare"; 9. "On fait le tour" feat. DJ Horg; 10. "Jrap avec mes trippes" feat. Sully Sefil; 11. "Revolta"; 12. 'Esperance"; 13. "Rap tous les jours" featuring Osfa; 14. "J moins deux"; 15. "V. A. I. L. L. A. N. T." feat. Roots Foundation; 16. "Plus"; 17. "Verbal Fight" featuring Zaho; 18. "Original moi"; 19. "Street Life (remix)" featuring Roots Foundation; 20. "J moins un"; 21. "Mtl Connection" feat. Va
Ma Raison: Date released: 2008	Track listing: Ma Raison; 1. "L'odeur du dancefloor"; 2. "Sur ma vie"; 3. "Infidèle"; 4. "Faux mc"; 5. "Je retiens mon souffle"; 6. "Ma raison"; 7. "Tour du mic"; 8. "Made in" feat. Minea; 9. "Donne-moi le temps"; 10. "Love & happiness"; 11. "Djamer" feat. Minea; 12. "Solide comme un rocher" feat. Mickey Dangerous; 13. "Si seulement"; 14. "Superstar"; 15. "Y'a pas moyen" feat. Minea; 16. "Bienvenue" feat. Bad News Brown
Couleurs: Type: EP; Date released: 2019	Track listing: Couleurs; 1. "À zéro"; 2. "Couleurs"; 3. "Sous la pluie"; 4. "Leila"; 5. "Revolver"; 6. "Corrida"; 7. "Diablo"

== Singles ==
=== With LMDS ===
- "Cette une belle histoire" (with Jodie Resther)
- "Joins toi à la dance"
- "Tu me dirais"
- "Le bien de demain"
- "La Squadra"

=== As solo act ===
- "Street Life" featuring Zaho (2004)
- "Sur ma vie" (2008)
- "Infidèle" (2009)
- "À zéro" (2019)
- "Corrida" (2019)
- "Sous la pluie" (2019)
- "Revolver" (2019)
- "Suffoque" (2020)
- "Namek" (2020)
- "HEAVEN" (2020)
