= Empire I =

- Also known as: The Gangstress, Empire ISIS
- Born: Miriam Moufide; 1981 (age 44–45); Bangor, Gwynedd, Wales
- Origin: Morocco, United Kingdom and Montreal, Canada
- Genres: dancehall, reggae, hip hop, pop, world music
- Occupations: Vocalist, singer-songwriter, rapper, activist
- Instrument: Vocals
- Years active: 2002–present
- Labels: Monumental Records, HLM, Distribution: Universal/DEP

Empire I (true name Miriam Moufide, also stage-named The Gangstress) is a singer, songwriter and social activist based in Kingston, Jamaica. Her musical style has been described as a blend of dancehall, reggae, hip hop, pop and World music. She is signed to Monumental Records and distributed by Universal Music Group and Zojak Worldwide.

== Early life ==
Born in Wales to a Moroccan father and British mother, she was raised in Morocco. At age 7 she moved to Montreal, where she lived with her 2 brothers, mother, and Ugandan/Yemeni stepfather.

At the age of 16, Moufide moved to Costa Rica for school and began a four-year trip around the world, living with small and marginalised communities. Her love for music and anthropology led her to visit and live in 30 different countries, and to eventually put her experiences to music.

== Activism and Charity ==
At 21 while in the Amazon rainforest attending the Bumba Meu Boi festival, she met members of the Rainbow Caravan for Peace and made the decision to join them as they visited indigenous villages and festivals. Drawing on her education in theatre, music and workshop facilitation she worked with them performing in street theatre and giving workshops on bioregionalism, permaculture, ecovillage design, nutrition and spiritual gatherings. Her lyrics often focus on social matters like women’s rights ("NANA Power"), building community ("Participate") and defending your dreams ("Get up on it", "Won't surrender").

The artist tries to use her international recognition to draw attention to issues that matter to her, by hosting and performing charitable events, especially in her home cities of Montreal and New York City.

The song S.O.S. To Freedom is currently being used in a campaign against human trafficking across the United States. You can also find her NANA Power song utilized in the Girls Action Foundation's, Light a Spark cause.

== Musical career ==
Moufide, having taken the stage name Empire ISIS, began making music while traveling in Jamaica, working with the legendary Jamaican musicians Dean Fraser and Chinna Smith, as well as Miami-based producers The Iconz. She recorded her debut album "Empress Gangstress" in part at Bob Marley's legendary Tuff Gong Studios in Kingston. It featured reggae singers Bushman and Half Pint. Empire ISIS has played in over 20 different countries, including Brazil, Panama, Colombia, Venezuela, Senegal and Canada and the American festivals SXSW and CMJ.

On her more recent albums, Empire I has worked and recorded with producers like Prayon and Kovas. As well as songwriting for Empire ISIS, she also writes under the name Miriam Moufide for other musicians and is published by Cherry Lane Music and pigFACTORY Music.

In June 2011, Empire I was voted into the "Wall of Fame" at the Montreal Hip Hop Summit and is now featured in the Montreal deck of "Legend Of The Fame" hip hop trading cards.

In 2012, Empire I relocated to Jamaica where she has been touring and recording, collaborating with a variety of producers including Truckback, J.Hennessy, Sam Diggy, Frassman Brilli and Rebel Camp Entertainment.

In 2016 Moufide changed her stage name to Empire I following issues with public confusion with the Islamic State of Iraq and the Levant frequently referred to in the media as "ISIS". She made the official announcement on the Jamaican program Onstage TV January 23, 2016.

== Film and television ==
2007

- Reggae Uncensored DVD, also featuring: Damian "Junior Gong" Marley, Sizzla Kalonji, Sean Paul, Junior Reid, Mavado and Collie Buddz

2008-2009

- Gangstress Chronicles: Series of interviews by Empire ISIS for Quebec music channel MusiquePlus featuring Gene Simmons, Janelle Monáe, U-God, Tricky, Kid Cudi, Perez Hilton and others.

== Song Placements ==
Born to Dance

Bad Girls Club

The Hills

Khloé & Lamar

Shameless (American TV series)

Burn Notice

Robson Arms

Notes from the Underbelly

Good Christian Belle

Make It Or Break It

The City

Seven Deadly Sins

Taking The Stage

The Millers

UJAMM Fitness

The Catalina

Girls

== Discography ==
- Empress Gangstress (2005)
  - featuring Half Pint and Bushman
- Sound The Trumpets (2007)
  - featuring Sizzla and Turbulence
- Brand New Style (2009)
- Crack The Code (2011)
- Back From The Dead (2017)

== Singles ==
- Come With Me feat. Fafadi (2013)
- Ignite Pink Wall Riddim (2013)
- Haute Couture (2014)
- Ina Da Streets (2014)
- La Pongo feat. El Freaky (2014)
- Fi Da Man Dem feat. El Freaky (2014)
- Boom Boom (2017)
- Beggi Beggi (2017)

== Awards ==
Some awards and nominations Empire I has received are listed below.

- Gala SOBA (Sounds of Blackness Awards)
  - 2008: Winner – Best English Single of the Year
  - 2008: Winner – Best World Music Music Artist of the Year
- GAMIQ(Quebec Indie Music Awards)
  - 2008: Nominee – Best World Album
- Hollywood Music Awards
  - 2008: Nominee – Best Pop Artist
- International Reggae & World Music Awards
  - 2005: Nominee – Most Promising Entertainer
- Montreal Hip Hop Awards
  - 2010: Winner – Female Artist of the Year
- Toronto Exclusive
  - 2007: Winner – Best New Artist
  - 2007: Winner – Best New Single
  - 2007: Winner – Best New Female Artist
- Toronto Independent Music Awards
  - 2008: Winner – Best Out-Of-Province – "Quebec"
- Underground Urban Music Awards
  - 2008: Winner – Best International Artist
