= I am à l'ancienne =

Studio album by K.Maro
- Released: 2002
- Recorded: 2002
- Genre: Hip hop/R&B; Pop rap Pop
- Producer: K.Maro; Sonny Black; Louis Cote

K.Maro chronology
I am à l'ancienne (2002)	La Good Life (2004)

I am à l'ancienne is the debut and first solo album from R&B singer and rapper K.Maro. The album includes the "Le clan chill" featuring Corneille.

After finding success in the hip-hop duo LMDS (the duo won awards and opened for Ja Rule), K.maro struck out to create a solo career and a new musical identity. The album is produced by DJ Short Cut, and includes "Le clan chill" featuring Corneille. Also very notable is "Symphonie pour un dingue" in two versions (original and remix) and written by Louis Côté who later on composed K. Maro's most successful song "Femme Like U". The remix version of "Symphonie pour un dingue" was done on a Sonny Black beat used in Corneille et Kulcha Connexion hits.

== Track listing ==
1. "Symphonie pour un dingue"
2. "I am a l'ancienne"
3. "Le clan chill"
4. "La maline"
5. "C'est mon commerce"
6. "La peste"
7. "So hot"
8. "Balbec dansant"
9. "Bouge tes fesses"
10. "Lady's night"
11. "Le thon, la brute et le puant"
12. "Mon vibe"
13. "More than music"
14. "Symphonie pour un dingue (remix)"
