= Caméléon (album) =

Studio album by Shy'm
- Released: 25 June 2012
- Recorded: 2011–2012
- Genre: Pop, electro, dubstep
- Length: 39:12
- Label: Warner Music France
- Producer: Cyril Kamar, Louis Côté, Tiery-F, soFLY & Nius

Shy'm chronology
| Prendre l'air (2010) | Caméléon (2012) | L'intégrale (2012) |

Alternative covers
- Deluxe edition cover

Alternative cover
- Live à Bercy Tour DVD Edition

Singles from Caméléon
- 1. "Et alors !" Released: 7 May 2012; 2. "On se fout de nous" Released: 27 August 2012; 3. "Et si" Released: 5 November 2012; 4. "Caméléon" Released: 8 April 2013; 5. "Contrôle" Released: May 2013

Caméléon is the fourth album by French singer Shy'm, released on 25 June 2012 on Warner Music France. Most of the material was written by Louis Côté and Cyril Kamar (also known as K.Maro), with some contributions from Tiery-F ("On se fout de nous" and "En plein cœur") and by soFLY & Nius ("Sur la route"). The album expanded on the Pop sound of previous album, Prendre l'air, largely abandoning the R&B sound that Shy'm had previously developed. Songs like "Et alors !" were Shy'm's first experiments with the dance genre.

== Background and development ==
Caméléon was Shy'm's second release since her victory on Danse avec les stars in winter of 2011 and the re-release of the highly successful album Prendre l'air at the same time. Shy'm worked with long-standing collaborators K. Maro and Louis Côté on the album but took her sound in new directions. In an interview with ChartsinFrance.net, She stated it was "a continuation of the previous album" but that there had been "an evolution". Influences for the album included Woodkid and the dubstep scene. Shy'm had no hand in writing on the album, as she felt "I do not necessarily have a natural talent for it". Production of the album was completed in just two months.

== Commercial performance ==
The album topped the French Albums Chart on chart dated 30 June 2012 with sales of 19,962, becoming Shy'm's first album to top the chart and her fastest selling album to date. It became her longest running album in the top 10, spending two months inside it. By the end of the year, it had spent only one week outside the top 40. The album was certified Platinum four months after release, and went on to be certified Double Platinum. It is currently Shy'm's second highest seller, behind only Prendre l'air.

== Singles ==
"Et alors !" was the first release from the album on 7 May 2012 in anticipation of the release of the album. It reached No. 2 on the French Singles Chart (matching "Si tu savais" as Shy'm's highest-peaking single), with Carly Rae Jepsen's "Call Me Maybe" holding it back from No. 1. The song was also her first digital No. 1, beating her previous peak of No. 3 with 2010's "Je sais".

The second single released from the album was "On se fout de nous". However, as with "Et alors !", there was no physical release for the song. The video for the song was released on 22 August and on the week ending 20 October 2012, the song peaked at No. 24 on the official French singles chart.

The third single from the album was a new version of "Et si", released to iTunes on 5 November. The new version featured less prominent guitars. On 20 December 2012, the music video for the single was released. On 29 December 2012, the song débuted at No. 198 on the French chart and has so far peaked at No. 51.

The fourth single from the album was announced by Shy'm on Twitter to be a new remix of the title track, "Caméléon". The single had already charted at No. 124 in France due to digital downloads upon the release of the album. A lyric video for the song on 8 April 2013, but no official music video was released for the song and there was no digital single released.

In May 2013, the 5th and final single from the album was announced to be "Contrôle". The song was sent to radio in the same month to promote the release of the Tour DVD edition of Caméléon. No music video was released for the song and it did not chart.

== Track listing ==
| No. | Title | Writer(s) | Producer(s) | Length |
|---|---|---|---|---|
| 1. | "Et alors !" | Louis Côté | Cyril Kamar, Louis Côté | 3:05 |
| 2. | "Et si" | Louis Côté | Cyril Kamar, Louis Côté | 3:36 |
| 3. | "On se fout de nous" | Tiery-F | Cyril Kamar, Tiery-F | 3:30 |
| 4. | "#ShimiSoldiers" | Louis Côté | Cyril Kamar, Louis Côté | 3:37 |
| 5. | "Contrôle" | Louis Côté | Cyril Kamar, Louis Côté | 3:30 |
| 6. | "Caméléon" | Louis Côté | Cyril Kamar, Louis Côté | 3:23 |
| 7. | "Comme un oiseau" | Louis Côté | Cyril Kamar, Louis Côté | 4:37 |
| 8. | "En plein cœur" | Tiery-F | Cyril Kamar, Tiery-F | 3:30 |
| 9. | "Black Marilyn" | Louis Côté | Cyril Kamar, Louis Côté | 2:58 |
| 10. | "Elle" | Louis Côté | Cyril Kamar, Louis Côté | 4:08 |
| 11. | "Sur la route" (feat. K-Maro) | soFLY & Nius | Cyril Kamar, soFLY & Nius | 3:18 |
| Total length: | | | | 39:12 |

Collector's edition bonus tracks
| No. | Title | Writer(s) | Producer(s) | Length |
|---|---|---|---|---|
| 12. | "Je rêve" | Louis Côté | Cyril Kamar, Louis Côté | 3:15 |
| Total length: | | | | 42:27 |

Deluxe edition bonus tracks
| No. | Title | Writer(s) | Producer(s) | Length |
|---|---|---|---|---|
| 13. | "Comme ils disent" | Charles Aznavour | Cyril Kamar | 5:20 |
| 14. | "White Christmas" (with Michael Bublé) | Irving Berlin | | 3:36 |
| 15. | "Et alors !" (Jérémy Hills Remix) | Louis Côté | Cyril Kamar, Louis Côté, Jérémy Hills | 2:57 |
| Total length: | | | | 54:20 |

Caméléon/Live à Paris Bercy bonus tracks
| No. | Title | Writer(s) | Producer(s) | Length |
|---|---|---|---|---|
| 12. | "Je rêve" | Louis Côté | Cyril Kamar, Louis Côté | 3:15 |
| 13. | "Et si" (Version radio) | Louis Côté | Cyril Kamar, Louis Côté | 3:39 |
| 14. | "Caméléon" (Pop Remix) | Louis Côté | Cyril Kamar, Louis Côté | 3:24 |
| 15. | "Caméléon" (Urban Remix - feat. K.Maro) | Louis Côté | Cyril Kamar, Louis Côté | 3:34 |
| Total length: | | | | 53:04 |

== Charts ==
=== Weekly charts ===
| Chart (2012) | Peak position |
|---|---|
| Belgian Albums (Ultratop Wallonia) | 3 |
| French Albums (SNEP) | 1 |
| Swiss Albums (Schweizer Hitparade) | 26 |

=== Year-end charts ===
| Chart (2012) | Position |
|---|---|
| Belgian Albums (Ultratop Wallonia) | 39 |
| French Albums (SNEP) | 16 |
| Chart (2013) | Position |
| Belgian Albums (Ultratop Wallonia) | 141 |
| French Albums (SNEP) | 66 |

== Certifications ==
| Country | Certification | Sales Certified |
|---|---|---|
| France | 3× Platinum | 300,000 |

== Personnel ==
Credits for Caméléon adapted from liner notes.

- Vocals: Shy'm & K.Maro on "Sur la route"
- Programming + instruments: Louis Côté except track 3, 8 & 11; Tiery-F on track 3 & 8; soFLY & Nius on track 11
- Guitar: Nicolas Prud'homme Lacroix on track 8
- Producers: Cyril Kamar for Ambitious Boys Club, Louis Côté for Studio Cyberlogy, Tiery-F for Famous Farmer, soFLY & Nius for MIB Entertainment
- Publishers: Ambitious Boys Club/Warner Chappel/Recto Verso Édition
- Executive producers: Cyril Kamar for Ambitious Boys Club & Warner Music France
- Management: Rock and Cherries
- Mixing: Nicolas Stawski at Studio de la Grande Armée, Paris
- Mastering: Éric Chevet at Masterdisk, Paris
- Additional mixing: Louis Côté at Studio Cyberlogy, Montreal (except track 3, 8 & 11)
- A&R: Cyril Kamar for Ambitious Boys Club
- Photography: Arthur Delloye
- Assistant photography: Kleber de Quay & Marine de la Loge
- Graphics: Rud'Pixels
- Hairstyling: Sylvain & Alexandrine of l'Agence Studios Franck Provost
- Make-up: Anne Pagis
- Styling: Aurélien Storny
- DVD authoring: Vectracom
