= Et alors! =

2012 song by Shy'm

Single by Shy’m

from the album Caméléon
- Released: 7 May 2012
- Genre: Dance-pop
- Length: 3:05
- Label: Warner Music France
- Songwriter: Louis Côté
- Producers: Cyril Kamar, Louis Côté

Shy’m singles chronology
| "En apesanteur" (2011) | "Et alors!" (2012) | "On se fout de nous" (2012) |

"Et alors!" is a song by French singer Shy'm, from her fourth album Caméléon. It was released to iTunes on 7 May 2012 as the lead single from the album. Written and produced by Louis Côté and Cyril Kamar, "Et alors!" is an uptempo dance-pop song which marked a departure from Shy'm's previous sound. Lyrically, the song speaks of defiance (the title translates as "So What!") and not trying to fit in with society. It went on to become one of Shy'm's biggest hits, and the song's music video has amassed over twenty million views on YouTube.

== Music video ==
The music video for the song was filmed in Paris and released to YouTube on 1 June 2012. It featured multiple alternating scenes and starts with Shy'm waking up in a house full of people, apparently after a house party. Soon after, she leaves the house and starts walking around the streets of Paris with numerous friends. They break into dance at Beaubourg. Other scenes feature Shy'm in a fashion house, picking out clothes among other people.

The video was generally well received by fans, but controversy over plagiarism arose. Zack Reece, a choreographer of X Factor France, alleged on Twitter that Shy'm had ripped off his choreography for the video to Christophe Willem's "Berlin". Shy'm responded on Twitter, reproaching him for his accusations and for doing it in public, and nothing else came of the situation.

== Chart performance ==
The song became one of Shy'm's best performing singles, both in France and elsewhere. In Belgium it matched "Victoire" as her highest peaking single, reaching #4, as well as being her highest charting single in Switzerland since "Victoire", despite only peaking at #58. The song also became her first single to chart in Canada, peaking at number 92.

In France, the song matched "Si tu savais" as her highest peaking single, reaching #2. After débuting at a lacklustre #64, the song slowly climbed up the French singles chart, eventually peaking at #2 for three weeks, spending seven weeks in the top 10.

== Charts ==
| Chart (2012) | Peak position |
|---|---|
| Belgium (Ultratop 40 Wallonia) | 4 |
| Canada (Canadian Hot 100) | 92 |
| France (SNEP) | 2 |
| Switzerland (Schweizer Hitparade) | 58 |
