= Et si =

Single by Shy'm

from the album Caméléon
- Released: 5 November 2012
- Genre: Pop
- Length: 3:36
- Label: Warner Music France
- Songwriter: Louis Côté
- Producers: Cyril Kamar, Louis Côté

Shy'm singles chronology
"On se fout de nous" (2012)	"Et si" (2012)	"Caméléon" (2013)

"Et si" is a song by French popstar Shy'm, from her fourth album Caméléon. It was chosen to be the third single from Caméléon and the radio edit of the song (which features less prominent guitars, and a more uptempo chorus) was released to iTunes on 5 November 2012. "Et si" (which translates to English as "And If") is a midtempo pop song in which Shy'm questions whether her love will last forever. It is one of the more ballad-like songs on the album. The album version primarily features guitar and piano, while the radio edit strips away the guitar and includes more synths.

== Music video ==
The music video for the song was shot in the French countryside, and switches between scenes in a house to scenes in a forest. At first, it focuses on Shy'm and her boyfriend in a country house, with friends arriving for a party of sorts. Throughout the house scenes, everyone ignores Shy'm, with some of her friends and her boyfriend nearly hitting her. It seems she is going through a breakup with her boyfriend until the final scene, in which everyone at the house travels to the woods. Shy'm is unsure of what they are doing there, until her boyfriend brushes the leaves off a grave. The grave is marked with Shy'm's real name, Tamara Marthe, and when she sees her name she breaks down into tears. Shy'm is actually a ghost, which is why nobody noticed her in the house.

The video was premiered on YouTube on 20 December 2012, and has to date been viewed almost 3,000,000 times. It received a hugely positive reception from fans, with them appreciating the emotional content of the video and the nostalgic feel.

== Chart performance ==
The song entered the official French singles chart at #198 for the week ending 29 December 2012, following the release of its music video. The following week, it dropped out of the chart. On the week ending 6 January 2013, it re-entered the chart at #174, before reaching #106 on the week ending 13 January 2013. On the week ending 27 January 2013, it peaked at #51.

== Charts ==
Chart (2013)	Peak position
Belgium (Ultratip Bubbling Under Wallonia)	6
France (SNEP)	51
