= Remcorp =

Canadian media company

- Company type: Private
- Founded: 1997
- Headquarters: Montreal, Quebec
- Key people: Maxime Rémillard

Remcorp is a Canadian private investment firm founded by businessman Maxime Rémillard. Its head offices are located in Montreal, Quebec.

== History ==
The company was founded in 1997 by Maxime Rémillard. Formerly known as Remstar, the company originally produced and distributed Canadian and international film products. Over time, with the experience gained through numerous projects, the company became an important player in the Quebec economy, with a portfolio of investments in diverse sectors.

At first involved in the entertainment industry, Remcorp now makes investments in companies working in a wide variety of sectors, such as technology, media, transportation services, health and well-being, real estate, and agriculture.

== Remstar Media ==
Through its divisions Remstar Productions and Remstar Distribution, the company produces and distributes film and television series throughout Canada and around the world. The company also owns its own music label, Remstar Interaction. It was originally named Remstar Corporation.

Groupe V Média, which was majority-owned by Maxime Rémillard, owned the television network V, which Remstar originally acquired from Cogeco and CTVglobemedia in June 2008 after it filed for bankruptcy protection.

In 2013, V Media Group announced a deal to acquire MusiquePlus (now Elle Fictions) and MusiMax (now Max), which Bell Media had put up for sale following its acquisition of Astral Media earlier in the year. The acquisition was approved by the CRTC on September 11, 2014; to fund the purchase, 15% stakes in V Media were sold to the Caisse and Fonds de solidarité FTQ. The sale was closed on September 16, 2014.

In 2019, V Media Group announced that it would sell its namesake television network, and its web platforms such as its streaming service noovo.ca, to Bell Media, pending CRTC approval. The company will retain its specialty channels. On April 3, 2020, the sale was approved by the CRTC. The sale was later closed on May 15, 2020. On May 20, 2020, Remstar Media became the owner of the specialty channels MAX and ELLE Fictions.
