= LMDS =

LMDS may refer to:

- LMDS (band), or Les messagers du son, a Montreal hip hop musical duo
- Local multipoint distribution service, abbreviated as LMDS, being microwave signals to transmit voice, video, and data signals for short distances
  - Multichannel multipoint distribution service, LMDS related to MMDS abbreviation for Multichannel Multipoint Distribution Service
- Life Model Decoy, in plural LMDs, fictional androids appearing in comic books
