= Million Dollar Boy =

Studio album by K.Maro
- Released: October 21, 2005
- Recorded: 2005
- Genres: R&B, pop rap, pop, hip hop
- Length: 50:29
- Label: K. Pone
- Producers: K.Maro; Louis Cote; Sonny Black

K.Maro chronology
La Good Life (2004)	Million Dollar Boy (2005)	10th Anniversary: Platinum Remixes (2006)

Singles from Million Dollar Boy
- 1. "Histoires de luv" Released: October 28, 2005; 2. "Les frères existent encore" Released: February 18, 2006; 3. "Gangsta Party" Released: October 28, 2006

Million Dollar Boy is the third solo studio album by the Canadian rapper K.Maro. The album was released in Europe on 21 October, 2005. There were three singles released from that album.

== Track listing ==
1. "K.M.A.R.O"
2. "Les frères existent encore"
3. "Histoires de luv" featuring Shy'm
4. "K.Pone. Inc."
5. "Gangsta Party"
6. "Million Dollar Boy"
7. "Nice And Slow" feat. Shy'm
8. "Juss Shake"
9. "Dirty"
10. "Strip Club"
11. "Nouveau Millenaire"
12. "The Greatest" feat. Divin
13. "Simple Vie"

== Singles ==
- "Histoires de luv" featuring Shy'm
- "Les frères existent encore"
- "Gangsta Party"

== Certifications ==
Certifications for Million Dollar Boy
Region	Certification	Certified units/sales
France (SNEP)	Gold	75,000^{*}
^{*} Sales figures based on certification alone.
