= Sous l'oeil de l'ange / Qu'est ce que ça te fout =

Single by K.Maro

from the album La Good Life
- B-side: "Qu'est ce que ça te fout"
- Released: February 18, 2005
- Recorded: 2004
- Genre: Pop Rap, Rap, R&B
- Length: 3:36
- Label: WMS
- Songwriter(s): Cyril Kamar; Sonny Black
- Producer(s): Cyril Kamar; Sonny Black; Divin; Louis Côté

K.Maro singles chronology
""Crazy"	"Sous l'oeil de l'ange / Qu'est ce que ça te fout" (2005)	"Histoires de luv" (2005)

Music video
- "Sous l'oeil de l'ange" "Qu'est ce que ça te fout" on YouTube

"Sous l'oeil de l'ange / Qu'est ce que ça te fout" is third single from K.Maro's album La Good Life. The lyrics of the double A-side single are in French.

The music video clips for "Sous l'oeil de l'ange" and "Qu'est ce que ça te fout" were both shot in 2005.

== Track listings ==
CD single

1. "Sous l'oeil de l'ange" — 3:31
2. "Qu'est ce que ça te fout" — 3:31

== Charts ==
=== Weekly charts ===
Chart (2005)	Peak position
Belgian (Wallonia) Singles Chart	9
French SNEP Singles Chart	10
Russia Airplay (TopHit)	5
Swiss Singles Chart	29

=== Year-end charts ===
2005 year-end chart performance for "Sous l'oeil de l'ange"
Chart (2005)	Position
Russia Airplay (TopHit)	77

2006 year-end chart performance for "Sous l'oeil de l'ange"
Chart (2005)	Position
Russia Airplay (TopHit)	85

=== Decade-end charts ===
Decade-end chart performance for "Sous l'oeil de l'ange"
Chart (2000–2009)	Position
Russia Airplay (TopHit)	184
