= La Good Life =

Studio album by K.Maro
- Released: July 9, 2004
- Recorded: 2003–2004
- Genre: Hip hop/R&B; Pop rap Pop
- Length: 56:10
- Label: EastWest
- Producer: K.Maro; Sonny Black; Louis Cote

K.Maro chronology
I am à l'ancienne (2002)	La Good Life (2004)	Million Dollar Boy (2005)

Singles from La Good Life
- 1. "Femme Like U" Released: May 8, 2004; 2. ""Crazy"" Released: August 5, 2004; 3. "Sous l'oeil de l'ange / Qu'est ce que ça te fout" Released: February 18, 2005

La Good Life is the second solo album from R&B singer/rapper K.Maro. The first official single from the album was "Femme Like U".

== Track listing ==
1. "Femme Like U"
2. "Crazy"
3. "V.I.P."
4. "La Good Life"
5. "My Lady"
6. "Walad B'ladi"
7. "Au Top"
8. "Sous l'Oeil de l'Ange"
9. "Rolling Down"
10. "Dense Dessus"
11. "Qu'est Ce Que Ça Te Fout"
12. "Que Dieu Me Pardonne"
13. "Petits Princes"

== Singles ==
- "Femme Like U"
- "Crazy"
- "Sous l'oeil de l'ange / Qu'est ce que ça te fout"

== Certifications ==
Certifications for La Good Life
Region	Certification	Certified units/sales
France (SNEP)	2× Gold	200,000^{*}
^{*} Sales figures based on certification alone.
