= Femme Like U (Donne-moi ton corps) =

2004 single by K.Maro

Single by K.Maro

from the album La Good Life
- B-side: "La Good Life"
- Released: May 2004
- Genre: R&B
- Length: 4:08
- Label: East West
- Songwriters: Cyril Kamar, Sonny Black
- Producers: Cyril Kamar, Sonny Black, Divin, Louis Côté

K.Maro singles chronology
"Femme Like U (Donne-moi ton corps)" (2004)	"Crazy" (2004)

Music video
- "Femme Like U" on YouTube

"Femme Like U (Donne-moi ton corps)" is a song by Canadian rapper K.Maro. The song was released as the first single from his album La Good Life in May 2004. Although the lyrics are in French, they also contain several words in English. The female chorus is sung by Nancy Martinez. "Femme Like U" achieved success in many countries in Europe, including Belgium, France, and Switzerland, where it topped the charts. As of August 2014, the song was the 14th-best-selling single of the 21st century in France, with 633,000 units sold.

== Music video ==
In the music video, K. Maro meets a woman while he comes down from his car. Then they have dinner together during a reception, but K. Maro has an altercation with the woman's former boyfriend. These scenes alternate with those of K. Maro performing the song.

== Awards ==
In 2005, "Femme Like U (Donne-moi ton corps)" (featuring Nancy Martinez) won a NRJ Music Awards in the category 'Francophone song of the year'. The single sold more than 1,500,000 units in Europe, making it K.Maro's most successful song.

== Track listings ==
CD single

1. "Femme Like U (Donne-moi ton corps)" (radio edit) — 3:50
2. "Femme Like U (Donne-moi ton corps)" (Just Another Hit remix) — 3:51

CD maxi

1. "Femme Like You (Donne-moi ton corps)" (radio edit) — 4:06
2. "Femme Like You (Donne-moi ton corps)" (urban version) — 3:58
3. "Femme Like You (Donne-moi ton corps)" (house version) — 6:39
4. "La Good Life" — 3:57

12-inch maxi

1. "Femme Like U (Donne-moi ton corps)" (radio edit) — 3:58
2. "Femme Like U (Donne-moi ton corps)" (urban version) — 3:58
3. "Femme Like U (Donne-moi ton corps)" (house version) — 6:39

== Charts ==
=== Weekly charts ===
Weekly chart performance for "Femme Like U (Donne-moi ton corps)"
Chart (2004–2005)	Peak position
Austria (Ö3 Austria Top 40)	4
Belgium (Ultratop 50 Flanders)	1
Belgium (Ultratop 50 Wallonia)	1
CIS Airplay (TopHit)	3
Czech Republic (Rádio – Top 100)	15
Denmark (Tracklisten)	17
Europe (Eurochart Hot 100)	3
Finland (Suomen virallinen lista)	6
France (SNEP)	1
Germany (GfK)	3
Hungary (Rádiós Top 40)	1
Netherlands (Dutch Top 40)	22
Netherlands (Single Top 100)	18
Poland (PiF PaF)	5
Russia Airplay (TopHit)	2
Switzerland (Schweizer Hitparade)	1
Ukraine (TopHit)	112

=== Year-end charts ===
2004 year-end chart performance for "Femme Like U (Donne-moi ton corps)"
Chart (2004)	Position
Belgium (Ultratop 50 Flanders)	11
Belgium (Ultratop 50 Wallonia)	3
France (SNEP)	2
Switzerland (Schweizer Hitparade)	7

2005 year-end chart performance for "Femme Like U (Donne-moi ton corps)"
Chart (2005)	Position
Austria (Ö3 Austria Top 40)	18
Europe (Eurochart Hot 100)	28
Germany (Media Control GfK)	4
Russia Airplay (TopHit)	195
Switzerland (Schweizer Hitparade)	30

=== Decade-end charts ===
Decade-end chart performance for "Femme Like U (Donne-moi ton corps)"
Chart (2000–2009)	Position
Germany (Media Control GfK)	81

== Certifications and sales ==
Certifications for "Femme Like U (Donne-moi ton corps)"
Region	Certification	Certified units/sales
Belgium (BRMA)	Platinum	50,000^{*}
France (SNEP)	Diamond	750,000^{*}
Germany (BVMI)	Platinum	300,000^{^}
Switzerland (IFPI Switzerland)	Gold	20,000^{^}
^{*} Sales figures based on certification alone.^{^} Shipments figures based on certification alone.

== Covers ==
The Canadian singer-songwriter Cœur de pirate released her own version in 2019. Her version was within the context of the "Back dans les Bacs!" (#BACKDANSLESBACS) project, a musical programme in which more recent upcoming and successful artists would pay tribute to earlier songs that they actually like from earlier artists.
