= Crazy (K.Maro song) =

Single by K.Maro

from the album La Good Life
- B-side: "V.I.P." (CD single); "Femme Like U (Donne-moi ton corps)"; "Walad b'ladi" (CD maxi only)
- Released: August 5, 2004
- Genre: R&B, Pop
- Length: 3:36
- Label: K.Pone
- Songwriters: Cyril Kamar, Sonny Black
- Producers: Cyril Kamar, Sonny Black; Divin, Louis Côté

K.Maro singles chronology
"Femme Like U" (2004)	"Crazy" (2004)	"Sous l'oeil de l'ange / Qu'est ce que ça te fout" (2005)

Music video
- "Crazy" on YouTube

"Crazy" is a 2004 song recorded by the francophone rapper Cyril Kamar, better known by the name of K.Maro. The song was released as the second single from his debut album La Good Life, on August 5, 2004. The song had a lot of popularity in UK, France, Belgium, Switzerland, Russia and other European countries.

== Track listings ==
CD single

1. "Crazy" — 3:34
2. "V.I.P." — 3:44
3. "Femme Like U (Donne-moi ton corps)" — 4:06

CD maxi

1. "Crazy" — 3:34
2. "Femme Like U (Donne-moi ton corps)" (just another hit mix) — 3:51
3. "Walad b'ladi" — 3:43
4. "Crazy" (video)

== Charts ==
=== Weekly charts ===
Chart (2004–2005)	Peak position
Austria (Ö3 Austria Top 40)	32
Belgium (Ultratop 50 Flanders)	14
Belgium (Ultratop 50 Wallonia)	4
CIS Airplay (TopHit)	17
Finland (Suomen virallinen lista)	9
France (SNEP)	2
Germany (GfK)	19
Hungary (Dance Top 40)	13
Hungary (Rádiós Top 40)	27
Netherlands (Single Top 100)	27
Russia Airplay (TopHit)	10
Switzerland (Schweizer Hitparade)	8

=== Year-end charts ===
Chart (2004)	Position
Belgium (Ultratop Wallonia)	37
Switzerland (Schweizer Hitparade)	95
Chart (2005)	Position
CIS (Tophit)	71
Russia Airplay (TopHit)	58

== Certifications ==
Certifications for "Crazy"
Region	Certification	Certified units/sales
France (SNEP)	Gold	250,000^{*}
^{*} Sales figures based on certification alone.
