= Ale Dee =

Canadian rapper

- Birth name: Alexandre Duhaime
- Origin: Trois-Rivières, Quebec, Canada
- Genres: Hip hop; R&B
- Occupations: Rapper; singer; songwriter
- Instrument: vocals
- Years active: 2000–present
- Labels: K.Pone.Inc Music Group
- Formerly of: Chosen One; Mine de rien
- Website: www.aledee.com

Alexandre Duhaime, better known by his stage name Ale Dee, is a Canadian rapper and singer. He had his beginnings in Mauricie region of Quebec with the musical group Chosen One (with Doris D and DJ Flavor). After Sir Pathétik joined in 2000, the name of the group was amended to Mine de rien.

Upon the disbanding of "Mine de rien", Ale Dee started a solo career. In March 2002, he had already won a second-place award "Hip Hop 4 Ever" event for "Francophone rap" category. The same year, he collaborated with Sir Pathétik in "S'pas normal". Another collaboration followed in 2006 with "T Town".

Ale Dee's first solo album was in 2006 and entitled Mine de rien, the name of his band. Ale Dee eventually signed with K.Pone.Inc for launching his second album in 2008 entitled Pour le love pis l'cash. The video clip for the main title track Pour le love pis l'cash launched in 2008 topped the MusiquePlus video charts.

== Discography ==
=== Mixtapes ===
- Mixtape dans la rue 2
- Comme je suis

=== Albums ===
Title and details	Notes
Mine de rien: Released: 2006	No. / Title / Length; 1. / "Dee Is Back" / 4:08; 2. / "Mes Deuces" / 4:25; 3. / "Trop Easy" / 4:20; 4. / "C'pas de ma faute" / 4:24; 5. / "Sorry" / 3:35; 6. / "J'suis péteu" / 4:30; 7. / "Say Is True" / 3:36; 8. / "Ale Dee Dee Dee" / 3:52; 9. / "Une place à côté de toi" / 4:10; 10. / "4 Real" / 3:44; 11. / "Qu'on fait ça" / 2:52; 12. / "Ouer" / 4:45; 13. / "Fuck You" / 4:46; 14. / "Arrête de parler" / 3:30; 15. / "Ben on l'a" / 3:49; 16. / "Mine de rien" / 3:33
Pour le love pis l'cash: Released: 2008; Record label:K-Pone Inc	No. / Title / Length; 1. / "Encore une fois de plus" / 4:52; 2. / "Pour le love pis l'cash" / 3:56; 3. / "Yeahhhhh" / 4:07; 4. / "Elle" (feat. Prinz Ali) / 3:31; 5. / "D'ou je viens" / 3:36; 6. / "On finit tous par briller" / 4:45; 7. / "Y a plus de diamants" / 4:08; 8. / "Depuis que t'es partie" / 3:47; 9. / "Get The Money" (feat. Mista Tee) / 3:20; 10. / "C'pour mes boyz" / 3:20; 11. / "Tu peux nous voir" (feat. Chaplin) / 3:18; 12. / "Je voudrais" / 3:57; 13. / "Legende" / 3:59
Entre la mine et l'papier: Released: 2010; Record label: Les Disques HLM	No. / Title / Length; 1. / "Entre la mine et l'papier" / 3:43; 2. / "J'pense à elle" / 3:55; 3. / "J't'haïs" / 4:05; 4. / "La femme de ma vie" / 4:17; 5. / "Put Em Up" / 4:18; 6. / "Inquiètes-toi pas" / 4:40; 7. / "Party"; 8. / "Cash"; 9. / "Hip Hop" / 4:33; 10. / "X Y Z" / 4:36; 11. / "Pour tous ceux" / 4:10; 12. / "L'arme d'ange" / 4:15; 13. / "Rap Game" / 4:13; 14. / "T'en rappelles-tu" / 3:38; 15. / "Renaissance" / 4:27; 16. / "Lève ton poing" / 3:45
Entre la mine et l'papier (rerelease)*: Released: 2010; Record label: Tacca Musique	No. / Title / Length; 1. / "Renaissance" / 4:27; 2. / "Put'em up" / 4:18; 3. / "Entre la mine et l'papier" / 3:43; 4. / "Pour tous ceux" / 4:10; 5. / "Larmes d'anges" / 4:15; 6. / "Hip Hop" / 4:33; 7. / "J'pense à elle" / 3:55; 8. / "La plus belle p**e" / 3:55; 9. / "Inquiète-toi pas" / 4:40; 10. / "T'en rappelles-tu" / 3:38; 11. / "X Y Z" / 4:36; 12. / "Lève ton poing" / 3:45; 13. / "Ale Diss" / 4:13; 14. / "Avec nous" / 3:20; 15. / "J't'haïs" / 4:05; 16. / "La femme de ma vie" (feat. Miray) / 4:17
4 minutes de gloire: Released: 2011; Record label: Les Disques HLM	No. / Title / Length; 1. / "Encore ma vie" / 3:50; 2. / "Rien ni personne" / 4:37; 3. / "QC" / 4:10; 4. / "Minutes de gloire" / 3:50; 5. / "Aux portes de l'enfer" / 4:40; 6. / "It's gonna be ok" (feat. Miray) / 3:29; 7. / "Je suis" (feat. Marie Dee) / 4:16; 8. / "Yep yep" (feat. Baxter Dexter) / 4:14; 9. / "2night" (feat. Donald Drumz) / 2:55; 10. / "Sans ailes" (feat. Miray) / 3:53; 11. / "Seulement k1 homme" (feat. Marie-Christine Depestre) / 4:15; 12. / "Be U" (feat. Marie Dee) / 2:56; 13. / "Réalité" (feat. Miray) / 3:35; 14. / "You Know" / 4:37; 15. / "Pour que tu reviennes" (feat. Jean-François Dubé) / 3:43; 16. / "C'est l'heure" (feat. Miray) / 4:06
2013 A.D.: Released: 2013; Record label: Les Disques HLM	No. / Title / Length; 1. / "J'reviens de loin" (feat. No Rush For a Lie) / 4:52; 2. / "Du Ale jusqu'au Dee" / 4:31; 3. / "F – " K" / 5:34; 4. / "Break Me Down" (feat. Don Lase) / 3:50; 5. / "Imma Do It" / 4:31; 6. / "La seul chose de vrai" (feat. Miray) / 4:49; 7. / "Dites-lui" (feat. The New Cities) / 3:56; 8. / "Me, Myself & I" / 4:05; 9. / "I Don't Need That" / 4:44; 10. / "Y m'ont dit" / 3:58; 11. / "Au top" (feat. Randy Raymond) / 3:37; 12. / "We On It" (feat. The Verse & Don Lase) / 4:41; 13. / "Si j'étais toé" (feat. Ray Ray) / 4:31; 14. / "C'est du rap" (feat. Ray Ray) / 4:31; 15. / "Une vie à vivre" / 4:14; 16. / "Embarque dans l'char" / 3:18; 17. / "Tu penses que koi" / 4:21; 18. / "Crazy" (bonus track) / 3:19

*The album was rereleased on Tacca Musique with slightly different track list including three more tracks, "La plus belle p**e", "Ale Diss" and "Avec nous" not found on the 2010 release, at the same time replacing three of the original album, namely "Party", "Cash" and "Rap Game".

=== Singles ===
- "Elle" (feat. Prinz Ali)
- "Une place à côté de toi"
- "Mes dues"
- "Pour le love pis l'cash"
- "Put Em Up" (2010)
- "La femme de ma vie" (feat. Miray) (2011)

== Collaborations ==
Ale Dee has collaborated with a number of artists:

- He is featured on T Town and on S'pas normal both by Sir Pathétik
- His song Elle features Prinz Ali, Get The Money features Mista Tee and Tu peux nous voir features Chaplin.
- Ale Dee's Garde Confiance features Online
- His song "La femme de ma vie" features Miray

== Awards and nominations ==
- At the Gala for SOBA (Sounds of Blackness Awards), he was nominated for "Choice of Public of MusiquePlus
- In 2002, he came 2nd at the "Hip Hop 4 Ever" event in the Francophone Rap category
