= Max (Canadian TV channel) =

French Canadian TV channel

- Max logo
- Country: Canada
- Broadcast area: National
- Headquarters: Montreal, Quebec

Programming
- Language: Canadian French
- Picture format: 1080i (HDTV) (2010–present); 480i (SDTV) (1997–present)

Ownership
- Owner: CHUM Limited (1997-2007); Radiomutuel (1997-1999); Astral Media (1999-2013); Remstar Media Group (2013-Present)
- Sister channels: Elle Fictions

History
- Launched: September 8, 1997; 28 years ago
- Former names: MusiMax (1997-2016)

Links
- Website: maxtele.ca (in French)

Max is a Canadian French language specialty channel owned by Remstar Media Group, a division of Remstar. The channel primarily broadcasts entertainment programming, focusing on scripted television series and films.

Established in 1997 as MusiMax as a joint venture between CHUM Limited and Radiomutuel, it was originally conceived as a sister network to MusiquePlus, and focused primarily on adult contemporary music (making it the French-language equivalent to MuchMusic's then-sister network MuchMoreMusic). After the acquisition of CHUM by CTVglobemedia, Radiomutuel's successor Astral Media acquired CHUM's stake in MusiMax, marking its separation from common ownership with its English counterpart. When Astral was acquired by CTVglobemedia's predecessor Bell Media in 2013, MusiquePlus was sold to V Media Group, parent company of Quebec's V network.

As with its English counterpart, MusiMax was formerly oriented primarily towards music programming. Due to shrinking interest in music television because of the growth of online platforms, MusiMax increasingly focused on non-music programming targeting a young adult audience, such as scripted programming and films. In 2016, Remstar relaunched MusiMax as Max into its current format while M3 (the former MuchMoreMusic) was replaced into the Canadian version of Gusto, which was renamed into CTV Life Channel in 2019.

As a former Category A service, Max was required to be carried on the basic service of all digital television providers serving the province of Quebec. The channel was, and still is, typically offered optionally at the discretion of providers outside of the province.

== History ==
Original logo used for only a few years during its inception

CHUM Limited first pursued a license from the CRTC for MuchMoreMusic—an adult contemporary counterpart to MuchMusic—in 1993, as part of a round of applications for new specialty channels. CHUM also proposed MusiquExtra, a French-language counterpart that would be a sister to MusiquePlus. The CRTC approved only Maclean-Hunter and Rawlco Communications' The Country Network, denying all other applicants.

CHUM submitted its proposals again in January 1996; they included both MuchMoreMusic and its French counterpart with Radiomutuel, now known as MusiMax, which proposed a service "designed for an adult audience that will be devoted to music in all its forms". On September 4, 1996, the CRTC approved CHUM and Radiomutel's application for Musimax. The channel launched on September 8, 1997.

Second logo introduced to more closely resemble the logo of its English sister-station, MuchMoreMusic

In June 1999, Astral Media announced it would take over Radiomutuel and gain control of Radiomutuel's assets including MusiMax shortly thereafter. In July 2006, CTVglobemedia announced it would acquire CHUM Limited. While the company initially planned to keep MusiquePlus and MusiMax, it instead elected to sell its stakes in the networks. On April 11, 2007, Astral Media announced that it would be acquiring the remaining 50% in MusiMax and MusiquePlus from CHUM Limited, giving it majority ownership. The sale was completed on June 30, 2007.

Fourth logo, actually a variation of the third logo, used from 2013 to 2016.

On March 4, 2013, following the Competition Bureau's approval of Bell Media's takeover of Astral, Bell announced that it would sell MusiquePlus, MusiMax, and Family and its three sister networks in an attempt to relieve CRTC concerns regarding the takeover. On December 4, 2013, Remstar, owners of the French television system V, announced that it would acquire MusiquePlus and MusiMax for an undisclosed amount through its subsidiary V Media Group. On September 11, 2014, the CRTC approved the sale. The acquisition is valued at $15.5 million; to fund the purchase, Remstar will sell 15% stakes in V Media to the Caisse, Fonds de solidarité FTQ and a third unannounced investor, and sell $1.5 million in advertising time across MusiquePlus and MusiMax to Bell. Remstar also successfully applied to have the amount of music-oriented programming the channel must air reduced to 80%. The sale was closed on September 16, 2014.

On August 29, 2016, MusiMax rebranded as Max, switching to a general entertainment format.

== Max HD ==
On August 23, 2010, Astral launched a HD feed of MusiMax called MusiMax HD. It is available on Bell Fibe TV, Cogeco and Vidéotron. On August 29th, 2016, Musimax HD rebranded to Max HD due to the name change.

== International distribution ==
- Saint Pierre and Miquelon - distributed on SPM Telecom systems.

== See also ==
- List of French-language Canadian television series
- List of Quebec musicians
- Music of Quebec
- Culture of Quebec
