= Les frères existent encore =

Single by K.Maro

from the album Million Dollar Boy
- Released: February 2006
- Genre: R&B, Pop Rap, Rap
- Length: 3:47
- Label: WMS
- Songwriters: Cyril Kamar; Louis Cote
- Producers: Cyril Kamar; Louis Cote

K.Maro singles chronology
"Histoires de luv" (2005)	"Les frères existent encore" (2006)	"Gangsta Party" (2006)

Music video
- "Les frères existent encore" on YouTube

"Les frères existent encore" is the second single from Million Dollar Boy, the second studio album by French-Canadian rapper from Montreal, K.Maro. In France, this single was the singer's fifth and last top ten hit.

== Track listings ==
CD single

1. "Les frères existent encore" — 3:39
2. "Million Dollar Boy" — 3:33

Digital download

1. "Les frères existent encore" — 3:39

== Charts ==
Chart (2005)	Peak position
Belgian (Wallonia) Singles Chart	15
French SNEP Singles Chart	8
Swiss Singles Chart	31
