= Histoires de luv =

Single by K.Maro

from the album Million Dollar Boy
- B-side: "Strip Club" (CD single); "Million Dollar Boy" (12")
- Released: October 28, 2006
- Genre: R&B, pop rap, hip hop
- Length: 3:47
- Label: WMS
- Songwriters: Cyril Kamar; Louis Cote
- Producers: Cyril Kamar; Louis Cote

K.Maro singles chronology
"Sous l'oeil de l'ange / Qu'est ce que ça te fout" (2005)	"Histoires de luv" (2006)	"Les frères existent encore" (2006)

Music video
- "Histoires de luv" on YouTube

"Histoires de luv" is fourth single by French-Canadian rapper K.Maro, and the first single from his third studio album Million Dollar Boy. The song contains mix of French and English lyrics.

== Track listings ==
CD single

1. "Histoires de luv" featuring Shy'm — 3:47
2. "Strip Club" — 4:19

12" maxi

1. "Histoires de luv" featuring Shy'm — 3:47
2. "Million Dollar Boy"

== Charts ==
=== Weekly charts ===
Chart (2005–06)	Peak position
Belgium (Ultratip Bubbling Under Flanders)	7
Belgium (Ultratop 50 Wallonia)	11
CIS Airplay (TopHit)	20
Finland (Suomen virallinen lista)	4
France (SNEP)	6
Hungary (Dance Top 40)	15
Hungary (Rádiós Top 40)	18
Switzerland (Schweizer Hitparade)	15

=== Year-end charts ===
Chart (2005)	Position
France (SNEP)	63
Chart (2006)	Position
CIS (Tophit)	101

== Certifications ==
Certifications for "Histoires de luv"
Region	Certification	Certified units/sales
France (SNEP)	Gold	200,000^{*}
^{*} Sales figures based on certification alone.
