= Remstar Media Group =

Canadian media firm

- Formerly: V Media Group (until 2020)
- Company type: Subsidiary
- Industry: Media
- Parent: Remcorp
- Subsidiaries: Elle Fictions; Max

Remstar Media Group is a privately held Canadian media firm, owned by the film production and distribution company Remcorp. It owns the French-language specialty channels Elle Fictions and Max.

== History ==
In June 2008, Remstar acquired the French-language network TQS, which had been owned by Cogeco and CTVglobemedia but entered bankruptcy protection in late 2007. The network was renamed V the following year. It was later reorganized into a separate entity named V Media Group, which was still majority-owned by Remstar, with a minority share held by a trust controlled by Remstar's owner, Maxime Rémillard.

In December 2013, V Media Group announced plans to purchase MusiquePlus and MusiMax from CTVglobemedia's successor Bell Media, which had earlier in the year received approval to purchase Astral Media, but divested several networks in order to reduce its total market share following the purchase.

The acquisition was approved by the CRTC on September 11, 2014. To fund the purchase, 15% stakes in V Media Group were purchased by each of the Caisse, Fonds de solidarité FTQ, and Investissement Québec, while Rémillard's trust also increased its stake. As a result, Remstar remains the largest single shareholder but no longer holds a majority interest in V Media; however Remstar's owner (Rémillard) still has majority control. The sale closed on September 16, 2014.

In June 2016, V Media Group announced a partnership with Vice Media; the companies will establish a studio to co-develop French-language content, and launch a French-language version of its Viceland specialty channel in 2017. However, plans for a French-language channel were dropped; instead V Media Group stated that they will feature Vice content in French on its channels.

In July 2019, V Media Group announced that it would sell its namesake television network, and its web platforms such as its streaming service noovo.ca, to Bell Media, pending CRTC approval. The company will retain its specialty channels.

On April 3, 2020, the sale was approved by the CRTC. The sale was later closed on May 15, 2020.

On May 20, 2020, V Media Group was renamed as Remstar Media Group.

== Current ownership structure ==
Following the purchase of MusiquePlus and MusiMax, the shareholders and voting interests of Remstar Media Group are now as follows:

- Remstar Broadcasting (wholly owned by Maxime Rémillard): 45.14% (combination of common and preferred shares)
- Fiducie Seismikmax (trust controlled by Maxime Rémillard): 9.86% (common shares)
- Caisse de dépôt et placement du Québec: 15% (preferred shares)
- Fonds de solidarité FTQ: 15% (preferred shares)
- Investissement Québec: 15% (preferred shares)
