= Imposs =

Haitian rapper

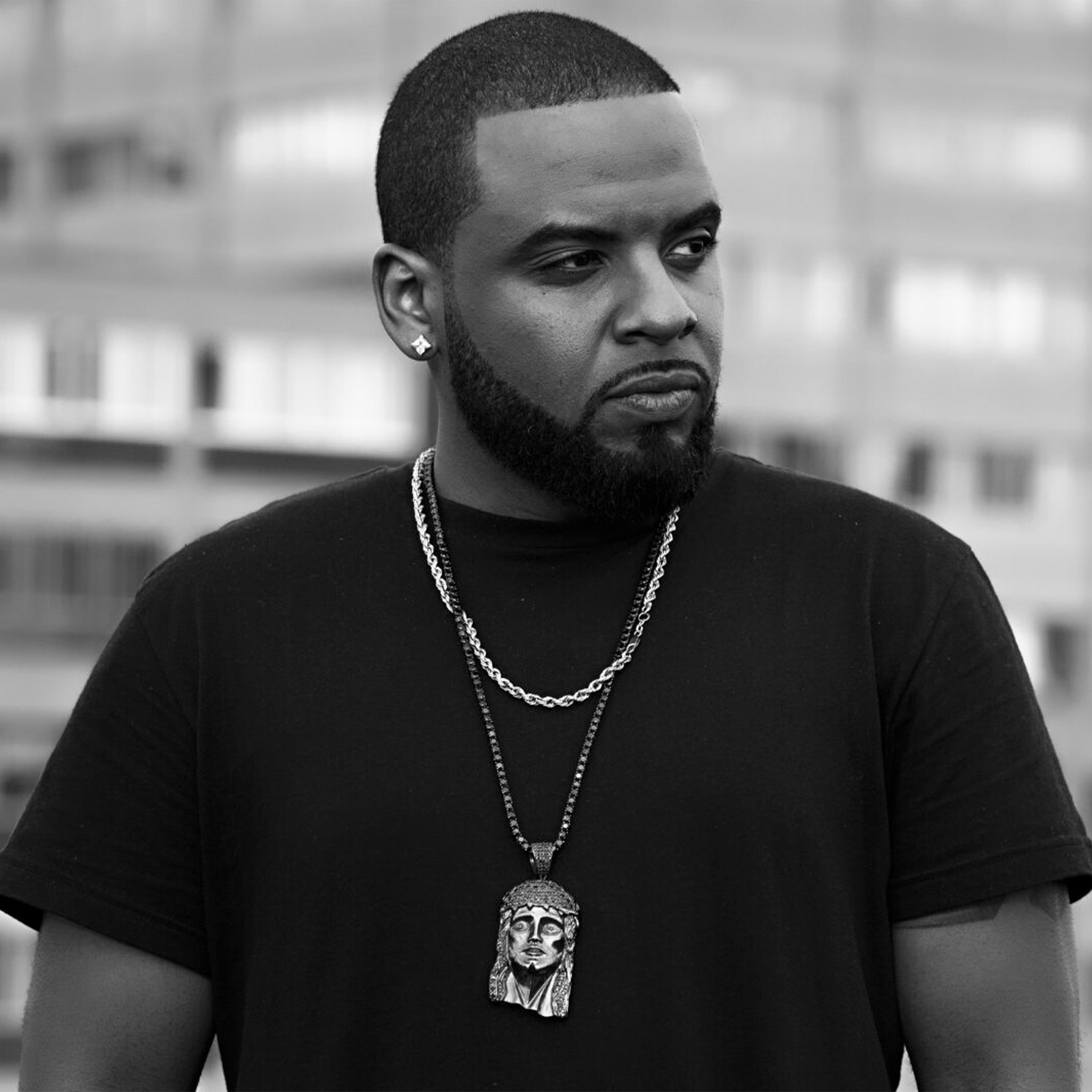
- Imposs in 2020

Background information
- Born: Stanley Rimsky Salgado; 12 September 1980 (age 46); Montreal, Quebec, Canada
- Origin: Port-au-Prince, Haiti
- Genres: Hip hop; reggae; dancehall; reggae fusion; soul
- Occupations: Rapper; musician; singer; songwriter
- Instrument: Vocals
- Years active: 1999–present
- Labels: Joy Ride Records, K-Pone Inc., WEA
- Website: http://www.myspace.com/imposs

Stanley Rimsky Salgado (born 12 September 1980), known by his stage name Imposs, is a Haitian-Canadian rapper, musician, singer and songwriter based in Quebec. Before becoming a solo artist, he was part of Muzion, one of the well-known hip hop bands of Quebec. He has collaborated on many occasions with Wyclef Jean during Muzion days and also as a solo artist. He is well known for dubbing the phrase "Real City" for Montreal. He is signed to Sony.

== As part of Muzion ==
As part of band Muzion that was formed in 1999, Imposs had great success with the band signing a contract with BMG. The debut album Mentalité Moune Morne in 1999 was a hit and Imposs became well known in the urban scene throughout Canada and Quebec in particular. After winning the "Album of the Year – Hip Hop" Félix Award, the band released their second album J'Rêvolutionne that got critical acclaim and again won the "Best Album of the Year -Hip Hop" in 2002. Imposs and Muzion toured France with IV My People, follow-up to the cult band NTM. In 2004, Wyclef Jean invited Muzion to collaborate with him on Wyclef Jean's hit 24 Heures à vivre. The francophone hit of Wyclef Jean witnessed huge success in France and internationally about the life of immigrants. The song won the "Prix Mirroir de la chanson d'expression française" (the Mirror Prize for song in French expression).

== Solo career ==
Imposs launched his solo career with an album entitled Mon Poing D'Vue through K'Maro's music label K-Pone Inc with coverage in the Quebec media including interview at TQS.

He took part in "Festival d'Eté du Quebec" that called him "widely respected and most influential performer on the Quebec hip hop scene"

His first single / video release was "Faut qu'j'm'en aille" released in 2007. He followed that with another single release called Rien d'interdit also in 2007. Rapper K-Maro appears in the video as a cameo.

When on 11 August 2008, Freddy Villanueva, an 18-year-old, lost his life by Montreal police bullets, and as a result riots ensued in Montreal-Nord district with a large concentration of minorities. Imposs was one of the first to intervene and was interviewed by the Quebec media as one of the opinion leaders presenting the Haitian and other minority communities. He also explained the grievances in Montreal's La Presse daily newspaper on 13 August 2008. Television stations held interviews with him about the incidents on Radio-Canada and RDI 24-hours news channel.

Imposs's new album Peace-Tolet debuted at number 76 on the Canadian Albums Chart.

== Nominations and awards ==
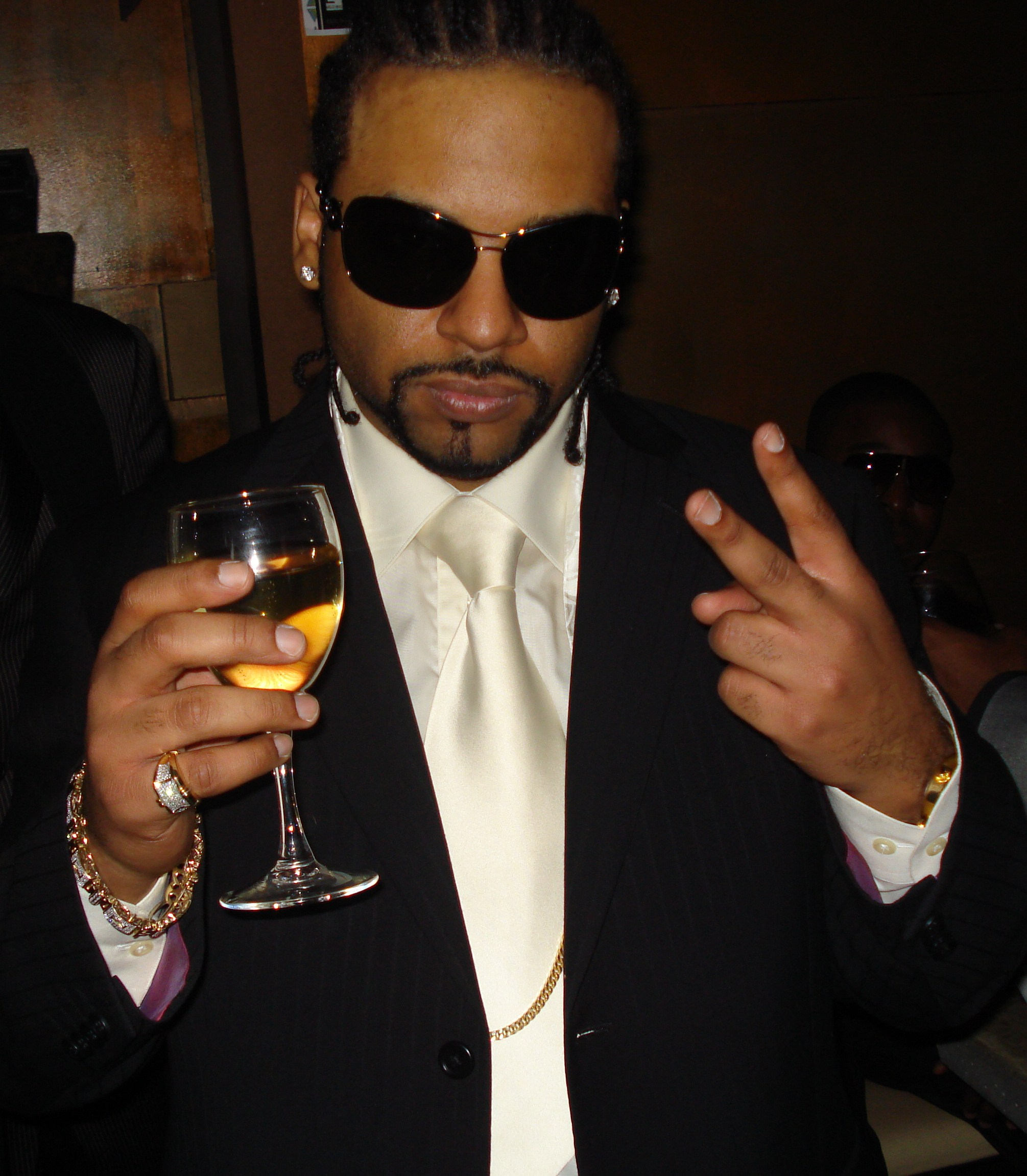
Imposs in 2008

During the period with Muzion:

- Nominated "Best singer-songwriter" at ADISQ Awards (2000)
- Winner of "Album of the Year – Hip Hop" for Mentalité Moune Morne at ADISQ Awards in 2000
- Winner of "Album of the Year – Hip Hop" for J'Rêvolutionne at ADISQ Awards in 2003

As a solo act:

- Nominated for "Album of the Year" for his album Mon Poing d'vue at the ADISQ Awards in 2008
- Nominated for "Song of the Year" for his single Rien d'interdit at the Sounds of Blackness S.O.B.A Gala in 2008
- Winner of "Francophone Album of the Year" for debut solo album Mon Poing d'vue at the Sounds of Blackness S.O.B.A Gala in 2008
- Winner of "French language Revelation of the Year" at the S.O.B.A gala in 2009
- Nominated for "Best Artist or Group – Francophone" at the S.O.B.A gala in 2009
- Nominated for "Best Francophone Video Clip of the Year" with Taktika for his song Au nom de qui? at S.O.B.A in 2009 in addition to nomination for "Best Francophone Collaboration of the Year" for the same song for Imposs and Taktika
- Winner of "S.O.B.A Public Choice Award" at the Sounds of Blackness S.O.B.A Gala in two consecutive years 2008 and 2009 voted via the Canadian music station MusiquePlus
- Winner of "Best Artist or Group – Frnacophone of the Year" during S.O.B.A gala in 2009

For 2 consecutive years (2008 and 2009), rapper Imposs won the prize for "Best francophone artist of the year", during the Quebec Sounds of Blackness Awards (S.O.B.A) specializing in urban and hip hop culture. The award is the most prestigious distributed annually.

== Festivals and Shows ==
Imposs has given more than 300 shows throughout Canada and in France. He notably is featured in a number of well-attended festivals including:

- Coup de Coeur Francophone – 1999
- Les FrancoFolies de Montréal – 1999, 2000, 2002, 2004, 2008
- Festival d'été de Québec – 2000, 2004, 2008, 2009
- Festival de Musique Émergente −2008

== Collaborations ==
Imposs has collaborated with a number of artists. However the most notable remains with another international artist of Haitian origin Wyclef Jean. It started when Imposs was in Muzion. In 2004 Wyclef Jean invited the band to collaborate with him on Wyclef Hean's hit 24 Heures à vivre. The francophone hit of Wyclef Jean witnessed huge success in France and internationally and went to win the "Prix Mirroir de la chanson d'expression française" (the Mirror Prize for song in French expression).

In the remix of Wyclef Jean's hit Let Me Touch Your Button Imposs is featured alongside will.i.am (of The Black Eyed Peas) and Jimmy O. (of Rap Kreyol)

Imposs is also featured in K'Maro's song Love It Or Leave It appearing in the latter's 2008 album Perfect Stranger

== Discography ==
=== Albums ===
==== With Muzion ====
The albums were released under the "VIK Recordings" music label:

- Mentalité Moune Morne (1999)
- J'Rêvolutionne (2002)

==== Solo ====
The album was released under K.Pone Inc music label:

- Mon Poing D'Vue (2007)

Tracks:

1. Intro (Les rideaux s'ouvrent)
2. Rien d'interdit
3. Mornier 4 Life
4. Faut qu'j'm'en aille (Bonnie and Clyde '07)
5. Dope Boys
6. Monte mes gardes
7. La preuve morte
8. Mwen te mouri
9. Vive la différence
10. Tu piges
11. Strip tip
12. Chlamedia
13. Ça fait longtemps
14. Du fond du coeur
- PeaceTolet (2012)

Tracks:

1. Qu'1 modeste journée (avec Cim-City)
2. Ouvrez le feu (avec J.Kyll)
3. Le même tralala
4. Donnez-moi une chance
5. À toi de briller (avec Alfa Rococo)
6. L'erreur est humaine // L'amour est égoiste (avec Audrey Joelle)
7. 2e souffle (avec France D'Amour & Sans Pression)
8. À 7 instant (avec Barnev)
9. Le coeur comme métronome (avec Bambi Cruz & Mc Solaar)
10. Tu veux qu'on 100 barres ?
11. On s'évade
12. Enfermé dans ma liberté (avec Corneille)
13. Richesse Québécoise (avec Eddy King & Izra L)
14. Tu l'auras, tue l'Aura
15. SeXorcisme (avec Mackadamion)
16. C'est ça ma vie

=== Singles / Videos ===
- 2007: "Rien d'interdit"
- 2008: "Faut qu'j'm'en aille"
- 2008: "Vive la différence"
- 2009: "Monte mes gardes"
