= Sounds of Blackness Award =

Canadian hip hop music award

Sounds of Blackness Award also known as S.O.B.A. or SOBA is an annual Canadian awards in hip hop and urban music in Quebec and Canada.

SOBA was established by Ruddy B. Eloi, well-known from a French-language Quebec television series Watatatow. He wanted to create a platform to reward artists hailing mainly from the black community of Quebec and Canada, without restricting it to just black-Canadians but open to all urban artists. He successfully organized two such events in 1996 and in 1999. But it obviously wasn't an annual event.

2007 saw the relaunching of SOBA as an annual gala event called GalaSOBA. It awards artists, singers, athletes, politicians and media personalities who have contributed to the development of the black culture in Canada.

Artists who have won Sounds of Blackness Awards include Empire ISIS, Imposs, Karl Wolf, Sir Pathétik
