= Prendre l'air =

Studio album by Shy'm
- Released: 11 June 2010
- Genre: Pop, synthpop
- Length: 42:11
- Label: K-Pone, WMG France
- Producer: Cyril Kamar

Shy'm chronology
| Reflets (2008) | Prendre l'air (2010) | Caméléon (2012) |

Alternative cover
- Deluxe edition cover

Singles from Prendre l'air
- 1. "Je sais" Released: 29 March 2010; 2. "Je suis moi" Released: 23 August 2010; 3. "Prendre l'air" Released: November 2010; 4. "Tourne" Released: 13 June 2011; 5. "En apesanteur" Released: 31 October 2011

Prendre l'air is the third album by French singer Shy'm. It was released in June 2010 and five singles ("Je sais", "Je suis moi", "Prendre l'air", "Tourne" and "En apesanteur") have been released. A departure from the R&B sound that Shy'm had previously been accustomed to, Prendre l'air showed a more pop-oriented side to her musical persona. The album debuted on the French album chart at #6, and has since gone on to be certified 3× Platinum, becoming Shy'm's most successful album. It has been released in three editions: standard, collector and deluxe.

== Commercial performance ==
The album debuted at #6 on the French album chart on the week ending 19 June 2010. This matched the peak of debut album Mes fantaisies but failed to match the peak of second album Reflets. However, a successful singles run and good promotion allowed the album to stay high in the charts for a long time. The album eventually spent 117 weeks in the French albums top 200. It was certified Triple Platinum, becoming Shy'm's best selling album to date.

== Singles ==
The first single released from the album was "Je sais" (English: "I Know"), an uptempo number signifying Shy'm's change in sound. "Je sais" was not released physically and thus did not chart (at the time, the official French singles chart was CD singles only), but reached #3 on the country's digital chart. It became her highest-peaking song on the digital chart until "Et alors !", two years later.

The second single was "Je suis moi" (English: "I Am Me"). Like the previous single, "Je suis moi" was not released physically. It did however peak at #7 on the country's digital chart.

The third single from the album was the title track, "Prendre l'air" (English: "Get Some Fresh Air"). Unlike the previous singles, this was eligible to chart, for the official chart now counted downloads. However, it was only able to peak at #21. The fourth single, "Tourne" (English: "Turn") peaked at #35, and the final single "En apesanteur" (English: "Weightless") reached #32.

== Track listing ==
| No. | Title | Writer(s) | Producer(s) | Length |
|---|---|---|---|---|
| 1. | "Je sais" | Cyril Kamar | Cyril Kamar, Louis Côté | 2:41 |
| 2. | "Prendre l’air" | Cyril Kamar | Cyril Kamar, Louis Côté | 3:33 |
| 3. | "Je suis moi" | Cyril Kamar | Cyril Kamar, Louis Côté | 3:21 |
| 4. | "Tourne" | Cyril Kamar | Cyril Kamar, Louis Côté | 3:22 |
| 5. | "Ne pars pas" | Cyril Kamar | Cyril Kamar, Louis Côté | 3:47 |
| 6. | "J'entends encore les mots" | Cyril Kamar | Cyril Kamar, Louis Côté | 3:33 |
| 7. | "En apesanteur" | Cyril Kamar | Cyril Kamar, Louis Côté | 3:50 |
| 8. | "Mauvaises nouvelles" | Cyril Kamar | Cyril Kamar, Louis Côté | 3:47 |
| 9. | "Déjà vu" | Cyril Kamar | Cyril Kamar, Louis Côté | 3:04 |
| 10. | "Elle danse" | Cyril Kamar | Cyril Kamar, Louis Côté | 3:46 |
| 11. | "Loin derrière" | Cyril Kamar | Cyril Kamar, Louis Côté | 3:30 |
| 12. | "Petit Tom" | Cyril Kamar | Cyril Kamar, Louis Côté | 3:57 |
| Total length: | | | | 42:11 |

Collector's edition bonus tracks
| No. | Title | Writer(s) | Producer(s) | Length |
|---|---|---|---|---|
| 13. | "Tout va bien" | Cyril Kamar | Cyril Kamar, Louis Côté | 3:35 |
| 14. | "Et si pour une fois" | Cyril Kamar | Cyril Kamar, Louis Côté | 4:11 |
| 15. | "Je sais (Jérémy Hills Radio Mix)" | Cyril Kamar | Cyril Kamar, Louis Côté, Jérémy Hills | 2:37 |
| 16. | "Je suis moi (Jérémy Hills Radio Mix)" | Cyril Kamar | Cyril Kamar, Louis Côté, Jérémy Hills | 2:56 |
| Total length: | | | | 55:30 |

Deluxe edition bonus tracks
| No. | Title | Writer(s) | Producer(s) | Length |
|---|---|---|---|---|
| 17. | "Prendre l'air (Acoustic)" | Cyril Kamar | Cyril Kamar, Louis Côté | 3:11 |
| 18. | "Je sais (Acoustic)" | Cyril Kamar | Cyril Kamar, Louis Côté | 2:38 |
| 19. | "Femme de couleur (Acoustic)" | Cyril Kamar | Cyril Kamar, Louis Côté | 2:55 |
| 20. | "Tourne (Acoustic)" | Cyril Kamar | Cyril Kamar, Louis Côté | 3:08 |
| 21. | "En apesanteur" | Gioacchino Maurici, Calogero, Alana Filippi | Cyril Kamar, Louis Côté | 3:40 |
| Total length: | | | | 71:02 |

== Charts ==
| Chart | Peak position |
|---|---|
| Belgium (Ultratop 40 Wallonia) | 29 |
| France (SNEP) | 6 |
| Switzerland (Schweizer HitParade) | 78 |

| Year-end chart (2010) | Position |
|---|---|
| French Albums Chart | 55 |

| Year-end chart (2011) | Position |
|---|---|
| French Albums Chart | 24 |

== Certifications ==
| Country | Certification | Sales Certified |
|---|---|---|
| France | 3× Platinum | 300,000 |

== Release history ==
| Region | Date | Format | Label |
|---|---|---|---|
| Belgium | June 14, 2010 | CD, digital download | Warner |
| Switzerland | June 14, 2010 | CD, digital download | Warner |
| France | June 14, 2010 | CD, digital download | K-Pone |
| France | October 18, 2010 | CD (Collector's Edition) | K-Pone |
| France | November 14, 2011 | CD (Deluxe Edition) | K-Pone |
