= Muzion =

Canadian rap group

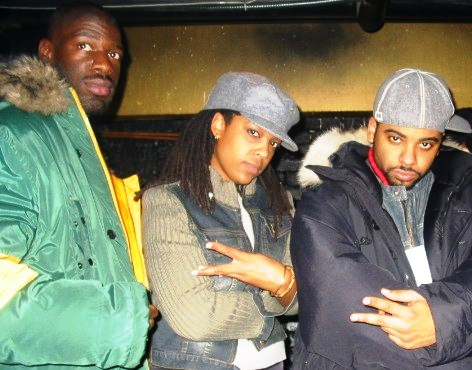

Background information
- Origin: Montreal, Quebec, Canada
- Genre: Rap
- Years active: 1996–2014
- Label: Vik
- Past members: Dramatik; Imposs; J-Kyll

Muzion was a Canadian rap group formed in 1996. The group is made up of rap artists of Haitian origin who lived in Villeray–Saint-Michel–Parc-Extension in Montreal, including Dramatik, Imposs (real name Stanley Rimsky Salgado) and his sister J-Kyll. Imposs went on to a solo career, releasing his debut solo album in 2007, Mon Poing D'Vue.

== Career ==
Muzion was considered a prominent group on the Montreal urban scene. The group won the Félix Award at the ADISQ gala for Best Album of the Year - Hip Hop twice, in 2000 for their debut album, Mentalité Moune Morne… (Ils n'ont pas compris) (Produced by Haig Vartzbedian), and again in 2003 for their second album, J'Rêvolutionne.

Based on the success of the albums in France, they toured with IV My People, an extension of the cult group NTM, playing at the Zenith in Paris.

Muzion collaborated most notably with Wyclef Jean in his francophone song 24 Heures à vivre.

The group was featured on a Canada Post stamp in February 2026 as part of its Black History Month collection.

== Awards ==
- Winner, "Album of the Year - Hip Hop" for Mentalité Moune Morne at the ADISQ Awards in 2000
- Nominated, "Songwriter of the Year" at the ADISQ Awards in 2000
- Nominated, "Group of the Year" at the ADISQ Awards in 2000
- Winner, "Album of the Year - Hip Hop" for J'Rêvolutionne at the ADISQ Awards in 2003
- Winner, "Best Francophone Recording Award" at the Canadian Urban Music Awards in 2004

== Festivals and shows ==
Muzion has performed many shows throughout Canada. Their most memorable shows were in Quebec and Paris, France. Muzion also performed at a number of well-attended festivals including Coup de Coeur Francophone (1999), Les FrancoFolies de Montréal (on three occasions in 1999, 2001, and 2002) and at the Festival d'été de Québec in 2000. As a revival and reunion, the group also performed in 2014 on the 15th anniversary of releasing Mentalité Moune Morne. The show was also a tribute to the influential rapper Le Voyou of Dynastie des Morniers. On July 26, 2019, their classic and long out of print debut album was reissued for the first time on vinyl to mark its 20th anniversary.

== Discography ==
=== Albums ===
- 1999: Mentalité Moune Morne… (Ils n'ont pas compris (VIK. Recordings) (Sony Music Entertainment Canada)
- 2002: J'Rêvolutionne (VIK. Recordings)
- 2019: Mentalité Moune Morne...(Ils n'ont toujours pas compris) XX - 20th anniversary reissue (Sony Music Entertainment Canada)
