= Reflets =

Studio album by Shy'm
- Released: 26 September 2008
- Genre: Pop, R&B, dance-pop
- Length: 47:10
- Label: K-Pone
- Producer: K.Maro

Shy'm chronology
Mes fantaisies (2006)	Reflets (2008)	Prendre l'air (2010)

Singles from Reflets
- 1. "La première fois" Released: September 2008; 2. "Si tu savais" Released: November 2008; 3. "Step Back (feat. Odessa Thornhill)" Released: 2009

Reflets is the second album by the French singer Shy'm, following 2006 Mes fantaisies. A more mature album than Shy'm's début, Reflets experimented more with electronic music. The album was released in September 2008 and débuted at #4 in France, but failed to match the success of Mes fantaisies. Three singles were taken from the album, including #2 hit "Si tu savais". The album was written and produced by longtime Shy'm collaborators Cyril Kamar and Louis Côté.

== Commercial performance ==
On the week ending October 4, 2008, the album débuted at #4 on the official French album chart, becoming Shy'm's highest peaking album at the time (it was later surpassed by 2012's Caméléon). However, it spent only five further weeks in the top 40 and only twenty nine weeks in the top 200. The album was considered a commercial success, it was certified Platinum, for sales of 100,000 units.

== Singles ==
Three singles were taken from the album, although only "Si tu savais" was released on CD. The first single from the album was "La première fois", which saw Shy'm move in a more electronic pop direction than before. "La première fois" was not eligible to chart on the official French singles chart, due to not having a CD release. Though not released on CD, the song charted at #15 on the French digital chart.

The second single from the album and the first released on CD was "Si tu savais". Due to having a CD release, this song was eligible to chart, and débuted at #2 on the official French singles chart. It is to date her highest peaking single, tied with 'Et alors !', which reached #2 in 2012.

The third and final single taken from the album was "Step Back" (featuring Odessa Thornhill). Released in early 2009, it was the first Shy'm single to prominently feature the English language. The single was unable to live up to the success of "Si tu savais", and became her first single not to chart on either the official or digital French charts.

== Track listing ==
No.	Title	Writer(s)	Producer(s)	Length
1.	"La première fois"	Cyril Kamar	Cyril Kamar, Louis Côté	3:24
2.	"Step Back" (feat. Odessa Thornhill)	Cyril Kamar	Cyril Kamar, Louis Côté	3:23
3.	"Tout est dit"	Cyril Kamar	Cyril Kamar, Louis Côté	3:15
4.	"Faut recommencer"	Cyril Kamar	Cyril Kamar, Louis Côté	4:01
5.	"Garde tout"	Cyril Kamar	Cyril Kamar, Louis Côté	4:06
6.	"Ma peur"	Cyril Kamar	Cyril Kamar, Louis Côté	3:42
7.	"Si tu savais"	Cyril Kamar	Cyril Kamar, Louis Côté	3:23
8.	"Je prends sur moi"	Cyril Kamar	Cyril Kamar, Louis Côté	3:06
9.	"Nulle part ailleurs"	Cyril Kamar	Cyril Kamar, Louis Côté	3:46
10.	"L’unique"	Tamara Marthe, Cyril Kamar	Cyril Kamar, Louis Côté	3:20
11.	"Pas pour moi"	Cyril Kamar	Cyril Kamar, Louis Côté	3:53
12.	"A l’abri" (feat. K Maro)	Cyril Kamar	Cyril Kamar, Louis Côté	3:46
13.	"On n'a pas tout notre temps"	Cyril Kamar	Cyril Kamar, Louis Côté	4:05
Total length:				47:10

== Charts ==
Chart (2008)	Peak position
Belgium (Ultratop 40 Wallonia)	13
France (SNEP)	4
Switzerland (Schweizer Hitparade)	55

== Certifications ==
Country	Certification	Sales Certified
France	Gold	50,000
