= Elle Fictions =

Canadian French language specialty channel

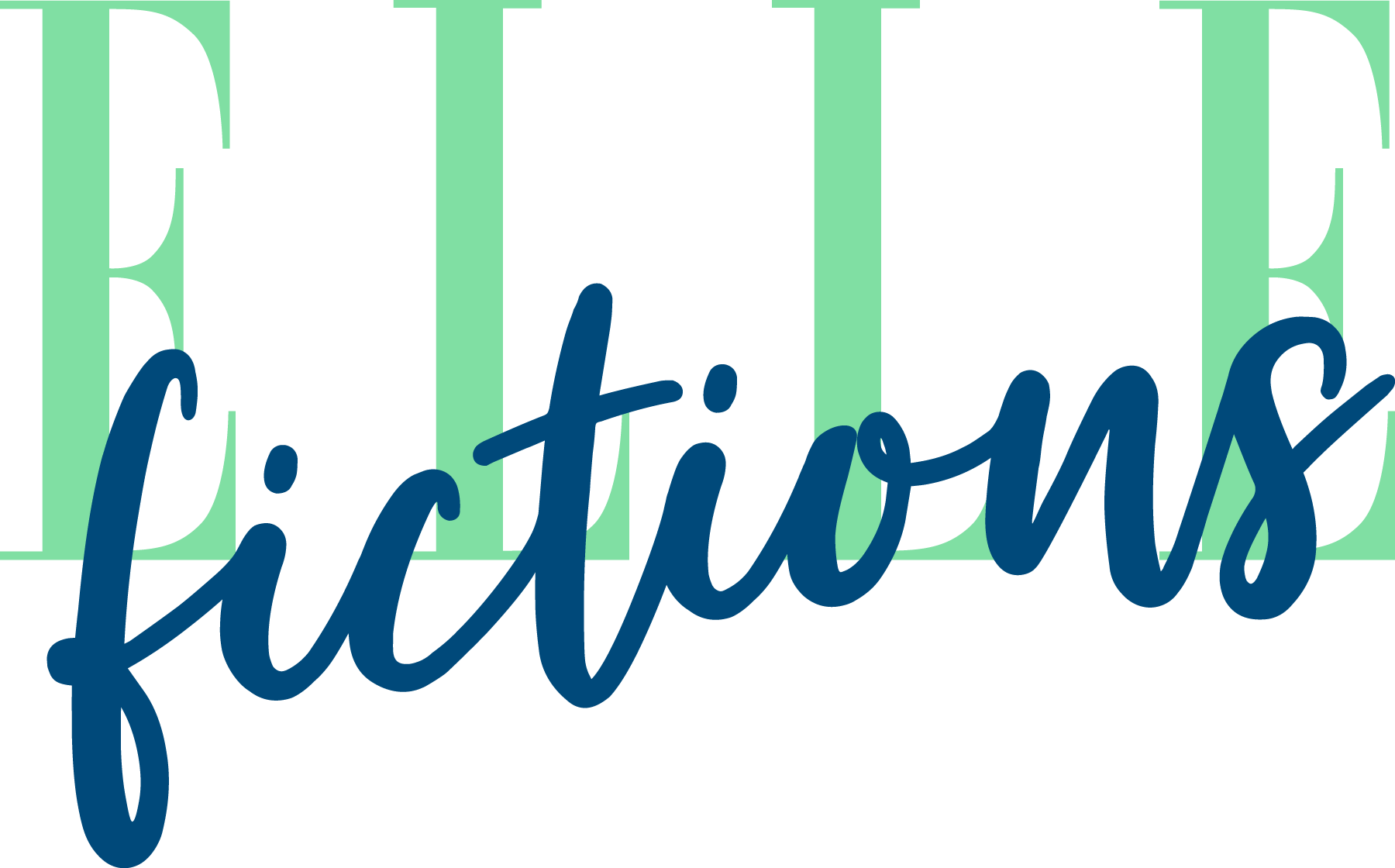
- Country: Canada
- Broadcast area: National
- Headquarters: Montreal, Quebec

Programming
- Picture format: 1080i HDTV (downscaled to letterboxed 480i for the SDTV feed)

Ownership
- Owner: Remstar Media Group
- Sister channels: Max

History
- Launched: August 26, 2019
- Replaced: MusiquePlus (1988-2019)

Links
- Website: ellefictions.ca

Elle Fictions (stylized ELLE Fictions) is a Canadian French language specialty channel owned by Remstar Media Group. The channel broadcasts general entertainment programming targeting young adult women.

It was founded in 1986 as MusiquePlus, a joint venture between CHUM Limited—owner of the English-language music television channel MuchMusic—and Montreal-based radio broadcaster Radiomutuel; the channel initially operated as a block timesharing with TVJQ, but received licensing as a standalone channel in 1988. Following the acquisition of CHUM by CTVglobemedia in 2007, Radiomutuel's successor Astral Media acquired CHUM's stake in MusiquePlus, separating it from common ownership with its English counterpart. After the 2013 acquisition of Astral by CTVglobemedia's successor Bell Media, MusiquePlus was sold to V Media Group, parent company of Quebec's V network. In February 2019, V Media Group announced that it planned to discontinue MusiquePlus entirely, and replace the channel with an entertainment format targeting women. The channel officially launched, licensed from the French women's magazine Elle, on August 26, 2019.

Due to shrinking interest in music television because of the growth of online platforms, MusiquePlus increasingly focused on non-music programming targeting a young adult audience, such as comedy, films, and reality shows. After the CRTC abolished genre protection rules in 2015, V Media Group announced in February 2019 that it planned to relaunch MusiquePlus as a general entertainment channel targeting women. This channel was officially relaunched as Elle Fictions—licensed from the French women's magazine Elle—on August 26, 2019.

As a former Category A service, Elle Fictions was required to be carried on the basic service of all digital television providers serving the province of Quebec. The channel is typically offered optionally at the discretion of providers outside of the province.

== History ==
=== MusiquePlus ===
Former MusiquePlus logo, similar to the logo of MuchMusic, while under CHUM

Launching on September 2, 1986, MusiquePlus originated with an eight-hour schedule, sharing channel space with TVJQ (a predecessor of VRAK.TV); it consisted of music videos and interviews and performances that were taped from a studio on Boulevard St. Laurent in Montreal. Four hours of this programming was produced from MuchMusic's studios in Toronto and sent to Vidéotron for broadcast in Quebec to subscribers of MuchMusic. This programming was repeated once daily.

CHUM later applied to the CRTC in 1987 for a licence to operate MusiquePlus as a dedicated 24-hour channel. The CRTC approved its application, and MusiquePlus was launched as a separate channel on September 1, 1988. The channel was a joint venture between CHUM Limited and Radiomutuel—each owning 50%. Radiomutuel was acquired by Astral Media in June 1999.

In July 2006, CTVglobemedia announced it would make a bid to buy CHUM Limited. Initial plans were to keep MusiquePlus and MusiMax, although CTVglobemedia soon announced that it would sell its stake in MusiquePlus and Musimax. On April 11, 2007, Astral announced that it would acquire the remaining 50% of MusiMax and MusiquePlus from CTVglobemedia, giving it full ownership—separating the network from its original parent. This deal was completed on June 30, 2007; to signify its independence from MuchMusic, MusiquePlus adopted a new logo the following year in September 2008.

On August 23, 2010, Astral launched a high definition feed of MusiquePlus.

==== Sale to Remstar/V Media Group ====
Final MusiquePlus logo; an encircled version was used from 2015 onward.

While MusiquePlus operated separately from MuchMusic ever since the deal, the network was almost re-united with its former parent in 2012 when CTVglobemedia's successor Bell Media attempted to acquire the entirety of Astral Media for an estimated $3.38 billion. However, the proposed deal was rejected by the CRTC. On March 4, 2013, following consultation with the Competition Bureau, Bell announced that it would go through with the purchase, but divest MusiquePlus, Musimax, and four other Astral-owned channels.

On December 4, 2013, Remstar, owners of the French television system V, announced that it would acquire MusiquePlus and MusiMax for an undisclosed amount. On September 11, 2014, the CRTC approved the sale. The acquisition is valued at $15.5 million; to fund the purchase, Remstar sold 15% stakes in the holding company V Media Group to the Caisse, Fonds de solidarité FTQ and Investissement Québec, and sold $1.5 million in advertising time across MusiquePlus and MusiMax to Bell. Remstar also successfully applied to have the amount of music-oriented programming the channel must air reduced to 80%. The sale was closed on September 16, 2014.

=== Elle Fictions ===
In February 2019, V Media Group announced that MusiquePlus would be replaced later in the year by a network featuring scripted programming catered towards a female audience. The company cited the successful relaunch of sister channel MusiMax as the general entertainment channel Max as a factor in the decision.

In May 2019, it was announced that the channel would launch on August 26 as Elle Fictions and that it would feature series and films targeting "active" young adult women. The branding is licensed from the French magazine Elle: the French Canadian version of the magazine had previously been published by Remstar rival Groupe TVA, but it had been announced that the rights were being acquired by KO Media—owned by local personality Louis Morissette.

In October 2024, Canada Post announced commemorative postage stamps honouring MuchMusic and MusiquePlus, depicting their respective headquarters.
