= LMDS (band) =

Canadian hip hop duo from Quebec

- Also known as: Les messagers du son
- Origin: Montreal, Quebec, Canada
- Years active: 1993–2001
- Past members: Cyril Kamar; Adil Takhssait

LMDS, an abbreviation for "Les messagers du son" was a Canadian French language hip hop duo formed in Montreal in 1993. The band was made up of Lyrik (real name Cyril Kamar) and Mélo / Mélopsy (real name Adil Takhssait).

The group broke up in 2001. Both artists continue their musical careers, Cyril Kamar/Lyrik as K.Maro and Adil Takhssait/Mélo/Mélopsy as Vaï.

== Band members ==
LMDS was formed in 1993 of two immigrant school friends:

- Cyril Kamar (Lebanese-Canadian origin), known as Lyrik in the band. He later on became successful as a solo artist, taking the name K'Maro, a hip hop and R&B singer-songwriter and producer. He also established and owns K.Pone Inc Music Group entertainment company and "K.Pone Inc" record label as well as "Balbec" line of clothing.
- Adil Takhssait (Moroccan-French-Canadian origin), known as Mélo (sometimes Mélopsy) in the band. He was born on 24 April 1979 in Paris, France. He relocated with his parents to Morocco and later on immigrated to Canada and settled in Montreal, Quebec. After the break-up of the band, Adil Takhssait has launched his solo career and is known by his artistic name Vaï, signed to his earlier bandmate Cyril Kamar's owned label K.Pone Inc.

Although a duo act, LMDS often included Philippe Greiss, composer and arranger for the group, singers Annie and Marco, DJ Benoît and the dancers Pascale, Nathalie and dance director Angelo.

== Discography ==
=== Albums ===
LMDS, Les Messagers du Son has had two successful albums.

- 1997 Les Messagers du Son
- 1999 Il Faudrait Leur Dire

The debut album of LMDS, the self-titled "Les Messagers du Son" achieved top positions in the Quebec charts and the duo were a revelation in Les FrancoFolies de Montréal music festival in 1999.

They followed that by "Il faudrait leur dire" and a compilation released in France, where both had resided for some time.

After the break-up of the group in 2001, Cyril Kamar (named Lyrik in the band) went solo under the name K.Maro and achieves considerable success internationally with 5 albums to date. Mélo (Adil Takhssait) has also a solo musical career under the name Vaï.

=== Singles ===
- "Une belle histoire" with Jodie Resther
- "Joins toi à la dance"
- "Tu me dirais"
- "Le bien de demain"
- "La Squadra"
