= Fonds de solidarité FTQ =

Québec-based development capital organization

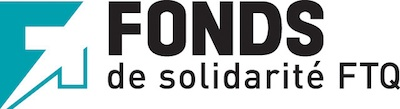
- Type: Company created by special legislation
- Industry: Development capital Venture capital Business financing
- Founded: June 23, 1983
- Headquarters: Montreal, Quebec, Canada
- Area served: Quebec
- Key people: Janie C. Béique; President & CEO
- Products: Registered Retirement Savings Plan

The largest development capital network in the province, the Fonds de solidarité FTQ was created on the initiative of the FTQ, Québec's largest central labour body.

As of November 30, 2022, the Fonds held $17.8 billion in net assets and had more than 753,000 owner-shareholders.

== Constituting act ==
The Fonds de solidarité FTQ was constituted on June 23, 1983 by an act of the Québec National Assembly, then headed by the René Lévesque government. The initial capital came from workers affiliated to FTQ that was complemented by provincial and federal governments.

== Business financing ==
For the last 5 years, the Fonds had invested an average of $771 million per year in Québec companies. It is a partner, either directly or through one of its network members, in over 2,839 Québec companies.

== RRSP ==
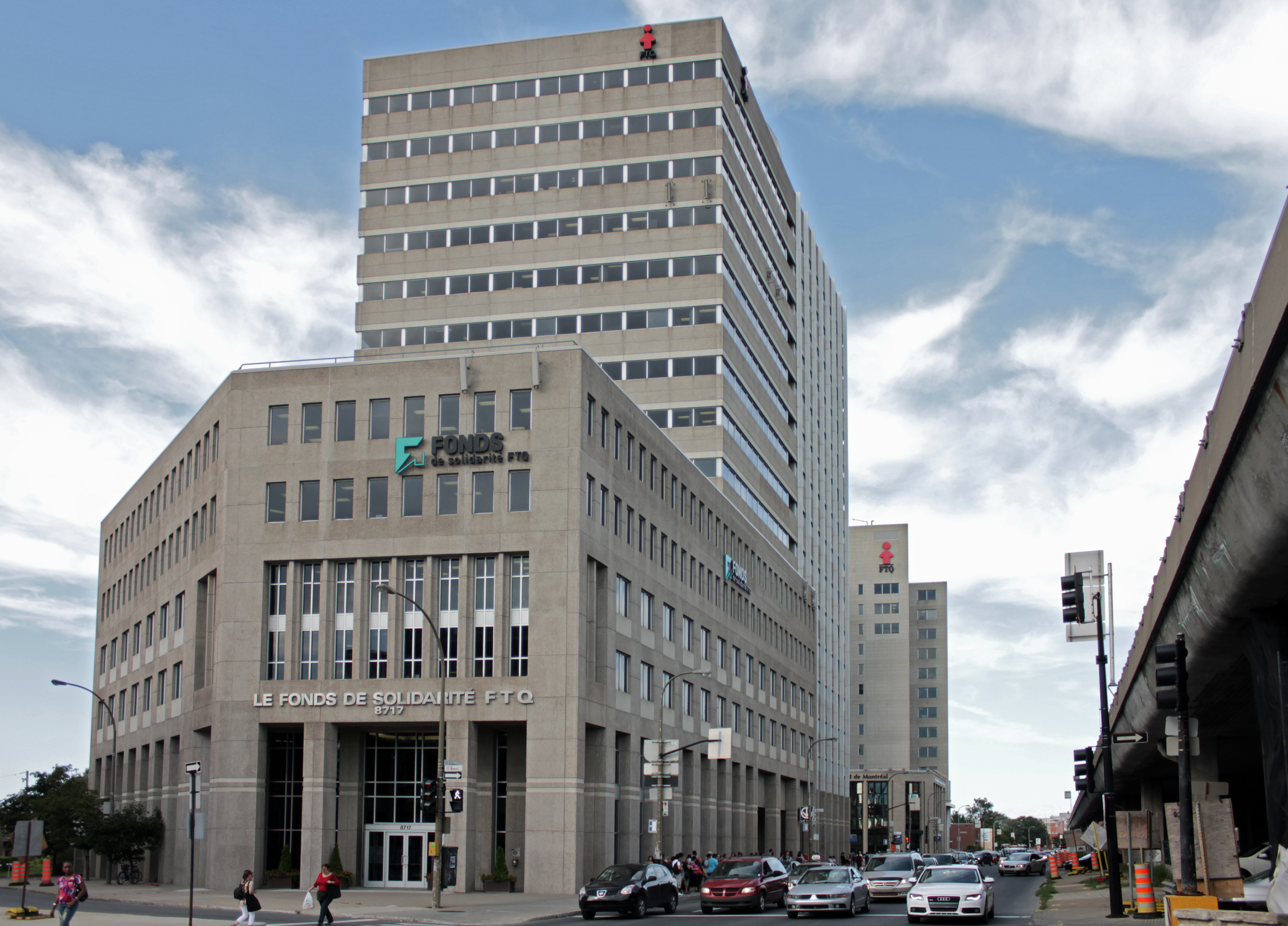
Complexe FTQ

Fonds shares, which are eligible for the Registered Retirement Savings Plan (RRSP), can be purchased by any Québec taxpayer either through payroll deduction – available in unionized companies or government organizations (an FTQ-affiliated or other union), – preauthorized withdrawals, or a lump sum payment. Anyone can purchase Fonds shares.

In its 36-year history, the Fonds has sold $16.7 billion in shares. The Fonds relies on a network of over 2,600 local representatives—unionized employees who promote the Fonds RRSP in their workplace.

Fonds shares are a popular investment because in addition to the tax benefits individuals obtain for buying an RRSP, they also receive two additional tax credits: 15% from each government (Québec and Canada) on the first $5,000 invested each year. Fonds shares cannot be sold before retirement except under certain conditions such as loss of employment, participation in the federal government's Home Buyers’ Plan, and disability.
