= Mes Fantaisies =

Mes fantaisies

Studio album by Shy'm
- Released: 30 October 2006
- Genre: R&B, pop, soul, hip hop
- Label: K-Ponepa
- Producer: K.Maro

Shy'm chronology
Mes fantaisies (2006)	Reflets (2008)

Singles from Shy'm
- 1. "Femme de couleur" Released: 15 September 2006; 2. "Victoire" Released: 16 February 2007; 3. "T'es parti" Released: 2007; 4. "Oublie-moi" Released: 18 January 2008; 5. "Rêves d'enfants" Released: 2008

Mes fantaisies is the first album by French singer Shy'm. It was released in October 2006 and achieved much success in France, where it reached number six and was certified double Platinum. It provided five singles, three of which were released physically. It yielded two top 5 singles in France—"Femme de couleur" and "Victoire"—and a further top 15—"Oublie-moi". The album is composed primarily of midtempo R&B, and contains a cover of Gilbert Montagné's 1984 song, "Le Blues de toi".

== Commercial performance ==
Released in October 2006, the album could only manage a debut of number 38 and by the start of December was as low as number 70. However, it gradually rose up the charts due to the impending release of "Victoire" and in January 2007 reached its peak of number six, which it stayed at for two weeks. The album remained a consistent presence in the French album chart due to its successful singles run and went on to spend 86 weeks in the French albums top 200, earning a double Platinum certification for sales of 300,000.

== Singles ==
The first single taken from Mes fantaisies was "Femme de couleur", released on the 15 September 2006. A midtempo, summery R&B song, "Femme de couleur" was a successful debut single, entering the French singles chart at number six, before reaching its peak of number five. The song went on to spend thirteen weeks in the French top 200.

The second single from the album was "Victoire", which became the album's biggest hit. Released on 16 February 2007, the single entered the French chart at number four, outpeaking "Femme de couleur" by once place. It went on to spend 23 weeks in the French top 200, and ended 2007 as the 25th best selling single of the year in France.

The third single was "T'es parti", which was never released as a CD and thus never charted in France as at the time digital sales did not count towards the chart. However, the fourth single, "Oublie-moi" was released on CD, and was thus able to chart. It only managed a peak of #14 in the French chart, becoming Shy'm's first physically released single to miss the top 10. However, it spent 21 weeks in the French top 200, outlasting "Femme de couleur" and only just coming short of the length of time "Victoire" spent top 200.

The fifth and final single from the album was "Rêves d'enfants", which also was not released on CD. It became Shy'm's second single not to officially chart.

== Track listing ==
No.	Title	Writer(s)	Producer(s)	Length
1.	"Shy'm"	Cyril Kamar, Louis Côté	Cyril Kamar, Louis Côté	3:39
2.	"Femme de couleur"	Cyril Kamar, Louis Côté	Cyril Kamar, Louis Côté	3:36
3.	"Ta Lady"	Cyril Kamar, Louis Côté	Cyril Kamar, Louis Côté	4:01
4.	"Sur les dancefloors"	Cyril Kamar, Louis Côté	Cyril Kamar, Louis Côté	3:42
5.	"Oublie-moi"	Cyril Kamar, Louis Côté	Cyril Kamar, Louis Côté	3:03
6.	"Pour vous"	Cyril Kamar, Louis Côté	Cyril Kamar, Louis Côté	3:27
7.	"Le Blues de toi"	Gilbert Montagné	Cyril Kamar, Louis Côté	4:12
8.	"Mes fantaisies"	Cyril Kamar, Louis Côté	Cyril Kamar, Louis Côté	3:48
9.	"T'es parti"	Cyril Kamar, Louis Côté	Cyril Kamar, Louis Côté	3:30
10.	"Tu comprendras"	Cyril Kamar, Louis Côté	Cyril Kamar, Louis Côté	3:43
11.	"Rêves d'enfants"	Cyril Kamar, Louis Côté	Cyril Kamar, Louis Côté	3:51
12.	"Victoire"	Cyril Kamar, Louis Côté	Cyril Kamar, Louis Côté	3:47
13.	"Femme de couleur (Remix)" (feat. Neïman)	Cyril Kamar, Louis Côté	Cyril Kamar, Louis Côté	3:55
14.	"Victoire (Remix)"	Cyril Kamar, Louis Côté	Cyril Kamar, Louis Côté	3:28
Total length:				51:42

== Charts ==
Chart	Peak position
Belgian (Wallonia) Albums Chart	18
Eurochart Hot 100 Albums	22
French SNEP Albums Chart	6
French SNEP Digital Albums Chart	7
Swiss Albums Chart	49

Year-end chart (2007)	Position
French Albums Chart	25
