= K.Maro =

Canadian rapper and singer

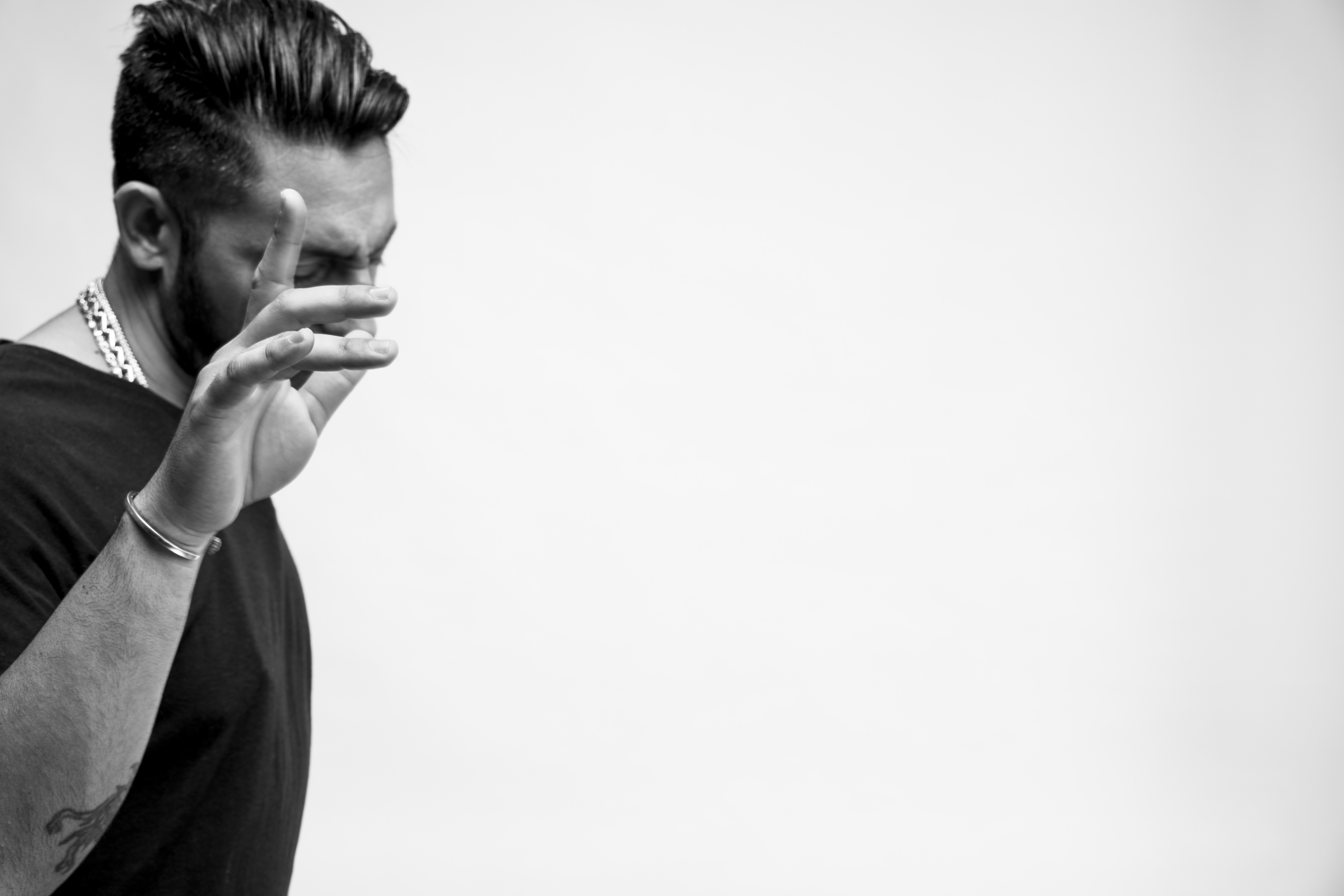
- Cyril Kamar in 2017

Background information
- Also known as: Kamar
- Born: Cyril Kamar; January 31, 1980 (age 46); Beirut, Lebanon
- Genres: Pop rap; hip hop; pop; R&B; electronic; rock
- Occupations: Rapper; singer; songwriter; businessman
- Years active: 1993–2025 (music)
- Label: East 47th Music

Cyril Kamar (Arabic: سيريل قمر; born January 31, 1980, in Beirut), known by his stage name K.Maro (/keɪ ˈmɑːroʊ/; sometimes stylized as K-Maro or K'Maro), is a Canadian rapper, singer and businessman of Lebanese origin. He sings in French and English. He is also the founder, the owner, and the CEO of East 47th Music, a record label, and Rock&Cherries Agency, a Paris-based Talents management agency. Both East 47th Music and Rock&Cherries Agency are part of KEG company (Kamar Entertainment Group).

== Biography ==
Cyril Kamar is a francophone and anglophone singer, producer and businessman living between Paris, France and New York City. Cyril Kamar was born in Beirut, Lebanon on January 31, 1980. After the end of the war, he moved with his family to Montreal, Quebec, in 1991.

=== Music career ===
K.Maro first broke through to the Quebec charts with his group LMDS, an abbreviation for "Les Messagers du Son". This was a French language hip hop duo in Montreal, Quebec, Canada formed in 1993 and made up of Cyril Kamar, called Lyrik, and Adil Takhssait, called Mélo in the duo.

The band achieved great success in Quebec and launched two successful albums, Les Messagers du Son in 1997 and Il Faudrait Leur Dire in 1999. LMDS broke up in 2001. Both artists continued their musical careers, Cyril Kamar (Lyrik) as K.Maro and Adil Takhssait (Mélo) as Vaï.

=== Solo career ===
After the breakup of LMDS, Cyril Kamar became successful as a solo artist, taking the name K.Maro (alternatives K'Maro and K-Maro). As a hip hop and R&B singer-songwriter and producer, his first major hit was "Femme Like U" in 2004, from the album La Good Life. "Femme Like U" was number-one single in 17 countries and Platinum certified, more than two million copies of the song were sold and more than a million copies of La Good Life album were sold.

In 2005, K.Maro released his third album Million Dollar Boy. Subject to commercial success, the album became certified Platinum.

To celebrate his decade-long music career, K.Maro released in 2006, Platinum Remixes album.

K.Maro released his fourth album in 2008, Perfect Stranger, his first all-English album.

His songs are frequently a mix of French and English lyrics, and sometimes Arabic.

=== Business career ===
In 2003, Cyril Kamar also established K.Pone Inc Music Group entertainment company, the K.Pone Inc. record label, and the Balbec line of clothing.

In 2010, Cyril Kamar joined Warner Music France as CEO of Ambitious Boys Club label record.

In 2013, he developed other ventures, including East 47th Music label record with Pascal Nègre and Universal Music Group.

=== Collaborations ===
In addition to his solo career, K.Maro has collaborated with a number of artists, including:

- Many collaborations with DJ Shortcut, notably in Fresh, which also featured Moshine. Another collaboration with DJ Shortcut and Moshine was in On est là.
- He was featured in Chance of The 411, version exclusively available on the French edition of Between the Sheets.
- He was featured in Le clan chill of Corneille.
- He was also featured in Nos couleurs of Cheb Mami.
- He featured Shy'm in his own single Histoires de Luv.
- Has written a lot of material for Shy'm's debut album Mes Fantaisies, and was featured in À l'abri in the second album of Shy'm, Reflets.
- He collaborated with Belly and Rad in Change The Game.
- His song "Love It or Leave It" features Imposs.
- His song "Out in the Streets Remix" features Jim Jones.
- His song "Never Walk Away" features Odessa Thornhill.
- His song "Take You Away (Part 2)" features the Canadian rock singer Jonas Tomalty.
- He produced the 2013 version of Indonesian singer Anggun's hit "Snow on the Sahara" for her album, Best-Of: Design of a Decade 2003–2013.

=== Personal life ===
Since July 2016, Cyril Kamar is married to the French brand and creative consultant Anne-Sophie Mignaux, former Jewelry, Watch and Arts editor in chief at CR Fashion Book (Carine Roitfeld's magazine) and Citizen K Magazine.

== K.Pone.Inc ==
K.Maro also runs the K.Pone.Inc. Music Group, an entertainment group that goes into music production, promotion and distribution. K-Pone Inc.'s label, K.Pone Inc., has signed many artists, including:

- Shy'm (Tamara Marthe)
- Imposs (S. Rimsky Salgado)
- Ale Dee (Alexandre Duhaime)
- Vaï (Adil Takhssait)

== Balbec ==
Balbec is K.Maro's upmarket clothing line. It is named after his hometown Baalbek in Lebanon.

== Discography ==
=== Albums ===
Year	Album	AUT	BEL (Fl)	BEL (Wa)	Canada	FIN	FRA	GER	SUI
2002	I am à l'ancienne								
2004	La Good Life	30	56	7		7	7	12	26
2005	Million Dollar Boy	—	—	11		—	5	—	20
2006	10th Anniversary: Platinum Remixes	—	—	—	—	—	76	—	—
2008	Perfect Stranger	—	—	88		—	79	—	—
2010	01.10								
2025	Place de Loréane VOL. 1								

Chart positions:

=== Singles / Videos ===
Year	Single	AUT	BEL (Fl)	BEL (Wa)	CAN	DEN	FIN	FRA	GER	NED	SUI	Album
2002	"Symphonie pour un dingue"	—	—	—		—	—	—	—	—	—	I am à l'ancienne
2004	"Femme Like U (Donne-moi ton corps)" (featuring Nancy Martinez)	4	1	1		17	6	1	3	22	1	La Good Life
2004	"Crazy"	32	14	4			9	2	19	27	8	La Good Life
2005	"Sous l'oeil de l'ange" / "Qu'est ce que ça te fout"	—	10* (Ultratip)	9		—	—	10	—	—	29	La Good Life
2005	"Histoires de Luv" (feat. Shy'm)	—	7* (Ultratip)	11		—	4	6	—	—	15	Million Dollar Boy
2005	"Les frères existent encore"	—	—	15		—	—	8	—	—	31	Million Dollar Boy
2006	"Gangsta Party"	—	—	13* (Ultratip)	—	—	—	—	—	—	—	Million Dollar Boy

Chart positions:

Non-charting singles / videos

- 2006: "Gangsta Party"
- 2006: "Let's go"
- 2008: "Out in the Streets"
- 2008: "Take You Away"
- 2009: "Out In The Streets" (remix) (feat. Jim Jones)
- 2009: "Elektric"
- 2009: "Music"
- 2025: "La reine de la fête"
- 2025: "Imagine"
- 2025: "Sin city"
- 2025: "Rêver mieux"
- 2025: "Magnolia"
- 2025: "Feeling"

== Awards ==
- In November 2006, K-Maro won The International Achievement Award at the 17th Gala of the Society of Composers, Authors and Music Publishers of Canada.
- In 2008, K-Maro won the International Achievement Award at the Francophone SOCAN Awards in Montreal.
