= Shy'm =

French singer

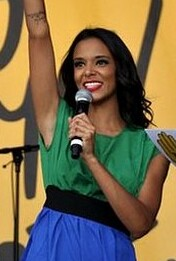
- Shy'm in 2011

Background information
- Born: Tamara Marthe; 28 November 1985 (age 40); Trappes, France
- Genres: Pop; dance; R&B
- Occupations: Singer; dancer; actress
- Years active: 2005–present
- Labels: Up Music; Warner Music France
- Website: shymofficiel.com

Tamara Marthe (born 28 November 1985), better known as Shy'm /ˈʃaɪm/, is a French singer and actress. She released her first album, Mes fantaisies, in 2006 and has since released six more albums. She had three Platinum albums, including her number-one 2012 album, Caméléon.

== Early life ==
Tamara Marthe was born on 28 November 1985 in Trappes (a suburb west of Paris). Her father was a singer from Martinique, Harry Marthe, while her mother was from Normandy. At her secondary school, aged seventeen, she obtained a Baccalauréat. She says she is shy, but much less so than before when the mere idea of being on stage paralysed her with fright. But her passion has allowed her to overcome her shyness and she now takes "pleasure in putting herself in the crowd".

== Career ==
Shy'm has explained her name as coming from the English word “Shy” and the initial M of Martinique.

Rapper K.Maro agreed to feature her in the song "Histoire de luv" from his album. The song was recorded in Montréal. After that, she released her own album, Mes fantaisies. It was written, composed and produced by K.Maro.

== Discography ==
- Mes Fantaisies (2006)
- Reflets (2008)
- Prendre l'air (2010)
- Caméléon (2012)
- Solitaire (2014)
- À nos dix ans (2015)
- H.E.R.O.S. (2017)
- Agapé (2019)

== Tours ==
- Shimi Tour (2011–2013)
- Paradoxale Tour (2015)
- Concerts Exceptionnels (2018)
- Agapé Tour (2019)

== Filmography ==
=== Film ===
Year	Title	Role	Notes
2019	The Queen's Corgi	Wanda	French dubbing
2024	Quatre Zéros	Sarah Marbello	

=== Television ===
Year	Title	Role	Notes
2020	Profilage	Élisa Bergman	Main role (season 10)
2020	Au secours, bonjour	herself	1 episode
2023	Un gars, une fille (au pluriel)	Chouchou	TV special
2023	Cannes Confidential	Léa Robert	Main role
2025	Drag Race France All Stars	herself	Judge
2026	Cat's Eyes	Gwen Assaya	Main role (season 2)
