= Diana Haddad =

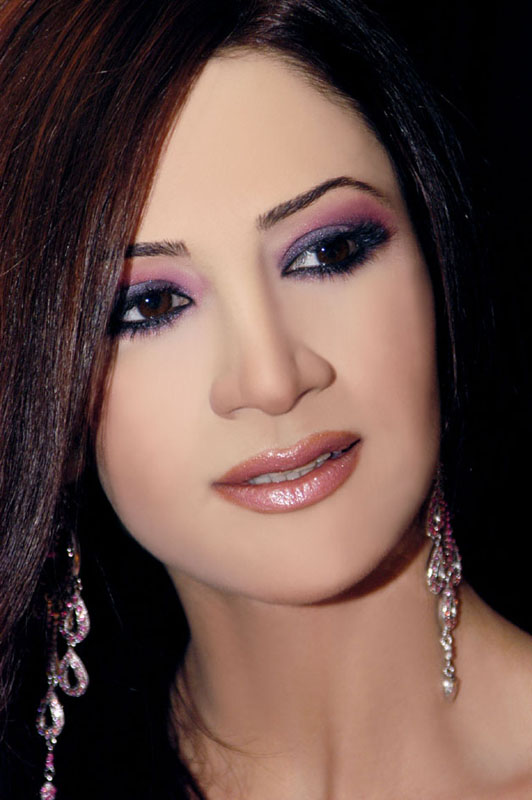
- Haddad in 2005
- Born: Diana Joseph Haddad ديانا جوزيف حداد; 1 October 1976 (age 50); Bsalim, Lebanon
- Occupations: Actress, singer, producer, television personality
- Years active: 1992–present
- Spouse: Suhail Al-Abdul (m. 1995; div. 2009)
- Children: 2
- Musical career
- Genres: Pop folk, Emirati, Lebanese, Khaleeji
- Labels: Stallions (1996–2002); Alam El Phan (2002–2005); Nojoom Music (2002–2009); Platinum (2011–2012); Rotana (2014–present)

Diana Haddad (Arabic: ديانا حداد; born 1 October 1976) is a Lebanese actress, singer, and television personality who also holds Emirati citizenship and is based in the United Arab Emirates. Haddad is one of the most popular Arabic pop musicians in the Arab World and has been so since the mid-1990s. Her debut album Saken (1996) was one of the best selling albums of 1996, being certified platinum by Haddad's label Stallions Records. The album also introduced Haddad and her Bedouin music style to the public.

Haddad's biggest breakthrough came in late 1997 when she released her third album Ammanih accompanied with a major hit single of the same title. During this time, Haddad formed a successful team with her Emirati ex-husband Suhail Al-Abdul who directed all of her music videos up until 2005 when she decided to work with new directors. Haddad also stepped out of her comfort zone when she started performing in dialects other than Lebanese and Bedouin in her fourth studio album Yammaya (1998) which included songs in Khaliji, Iraqi, and Egyptian dialects. Hadded's career saw ups and downs, but overall she was able to produce memorable hit singles. These include songs like "Saken" and "Ammanih" in the 1990s, "Mani Mani", "Mas & Louly", and "Ya Aibo" in the 2000s, "La Fiesta" and "Ela Hona" in the 2010s.

== Life and career ==
=== 1976–1992: Early life ===
Haddad was born to a Maronite Christian father, Joseph Haddad (originally from Maghdouché, Sidon District), and a Muslim mother, Mouna Haddad, in a small Lebanese village called Bsalim. Due to the Lebanese Civil War which began in 1975 (one year prior to her birth) and lasted over fifteen years, Haddad spent her early years in the more stable Arab states of the Persian Gulf. Her parents moved to Kuwait in the 1970s where she received her education at the national school in Fahaheel District. In 1990, Kuwait was invaded by Iraq, which forced Haddad's family to move back to Lebanon. During this period, Haddad lived between Lebanon and the United Arab Emirates where she met her Emariti husband Suhail Al-Abdul. Haddad was raised in her father's religion along with her four siblings, Lolita, Danny, Fadi, and Sameer. In terms of age, Haddad ranks third. As a child, Haddad was known to be a "tomboy" in her family. Haddad's musical talent was discovered in an early age when she was only eight years old. During her teen years, specifically in 1988, Haddad performed in multiple Kuwaiti national events. Haddad never received a college degree even though she was interested in archeology. For this reason, Haddad enjoyed shooting the song "Yammaya" in the Giza pyramid complex in 1998. In 1992, she received a diploma in computer science before she joined a popular singing competition called Studio El Fan in Beirut.

=== 1993–1997: Saken and Ahl Al Esheg ===
With the help of Studio El Fan, which was broadcast nationally on LBC in 1993, Haddad was able to come to fame at sixteen. She joined the competition with an original song entitled "Tayr El Yammameh", which was later included on her debut record Saken in 1996. Haddad was listed under the category of traditional Lebanese folk song. The song was written and produced by Elias Abou Gzale. At the beginning of her career, Haddad was best known for her Bedouin music style which also incorporates modern beats and instruments. Thus, she has been compared to Lebanese musician Samira Tawfik. Haddad's music is considered an update of Tawfik's early work. Haddad's debut album also included other hits such as "Lagaitek", a cover of Issam Rajji's classic hit, and "Al-Sahra".

Her second album, Ahl Al Esheg produced the hit single "Ahl Al Esheg" in early 1997 and the moderate hit "Bizal Minak" in summer 1997. "Ahl Al Esheg" is considered one of Haddad's signature songs and is still performed in most of her concerts. "Bizal Minak", while not as successful as "Ahl Al Esheg", had a controversial music video which was shot in London. The song's chorus can be translated to "I showed you the right way, but you're still walking in the wrong direction". Hence, the black and white music video, which was directed by Haddad's then-husband, shows padestrians in London walking backwards while Haddad is the only person walking in the correct direction. Haddad claimed that she memorized the lyrics of the song backwards in order to make the video works. The video also shows Prince Charles walking backwards in reference to his marriage problems. Ironically, Princess Diana died few months after the shooting of the video.

=== 1998–1999: Ammanih, Yammaya, and Shater ===
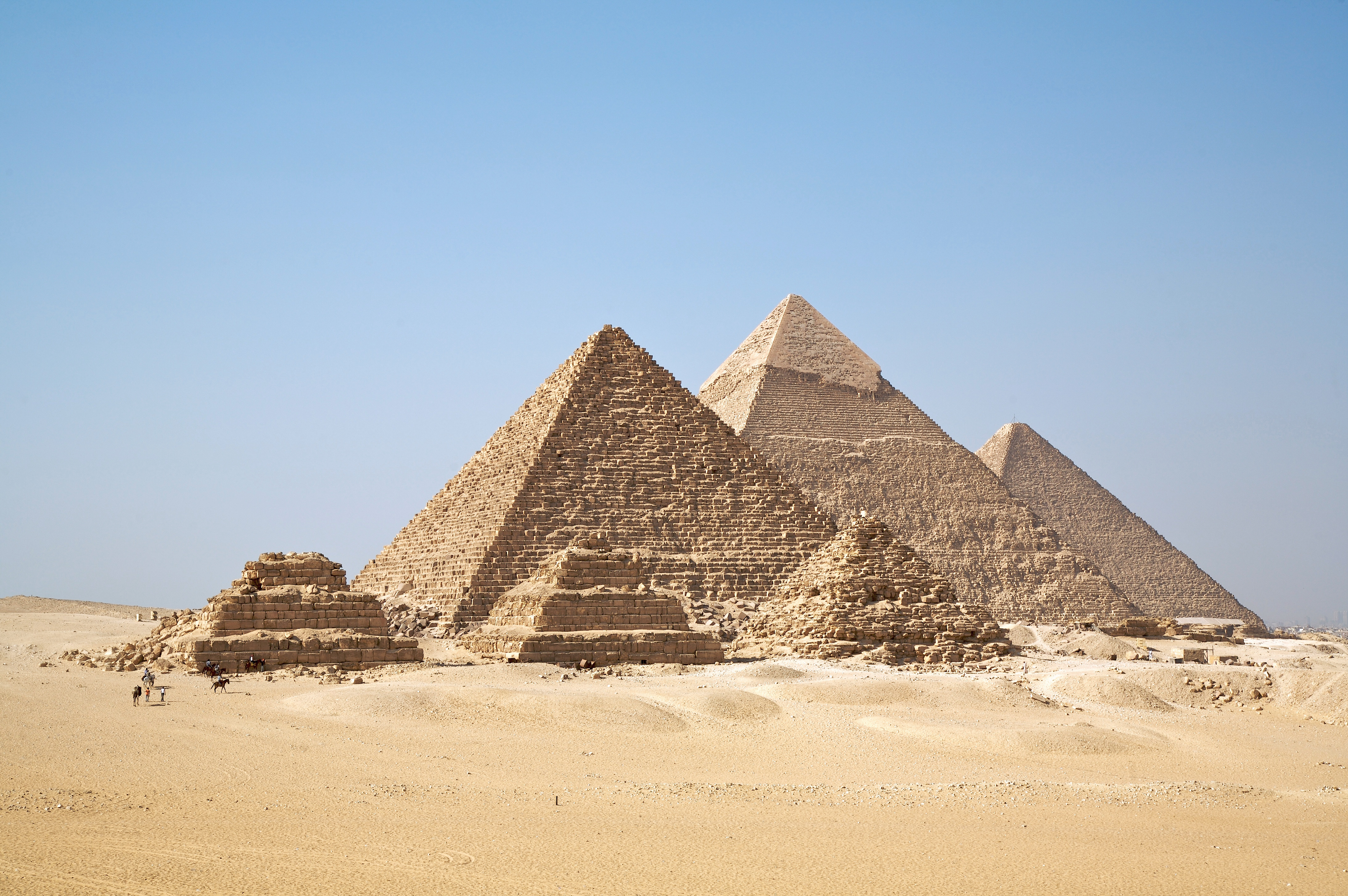
Suhail Al-Abdul chose to shoot the music video for "Yammya" (1998) in Giza pyramid complex. He allotted a budget of £E1 million for the video. Actors such as Muna Wassef and Sawsan Badr make an appearance in the video along with 100 extras and 40 dancers. The video is still one of the most memorable moments in Haddad's career.

Following the release of her first two albums, Saken and Ahl Al Esheg in 1996 and 1997, respectively, Haddad had to plan her third album more carefully in order to sustain her success. After careful planning of a third album, radio stations around the Arab world started airing "Ammanih", the lead single of her third studio album, in late 1997 which later became Haddad's biggest breakthrough. Several reasons contributed to "Ammanih"'s success. One of which, is the innovative use of the Turkish style "Amanes" in a Bedouin song. The imagery incorporated in the music video was also an important factor in making "Ammanih" a major hit. The video, which was also directed by Haddad's husband at the time, was shot in Turkey and showed both the modern and the traditional side of the country. In the first scene, young Turkish dancers are seen dancing in causal black shirts and jeans. In other scenes, dancers are shown wearing Ottoman clothes such as kaftans and turbans. The video is considered one of the early media exposures to the Turkish culture in the Arab world and therefore it promoted Arab tourism in the country. Shooting Arabic music videos in Turkey became a trend in later years and peaked in the early 2000s. On 19 July 1996, Haddad gave birth to her first daughter Sophie. The birth of Sophie inspired the second single from "Ammanih", the ballad "Ya Benti" which was shot by Al-Abdul in a poor rural area in Lebanon and shows two-year-old Sophie suffering poverty with her mother. In the lyrics of "Ya Benti", which translates to "Oh my daughter", a mother apologizes to her little daughter for not being able to take her out or afford life luxuries and toys.

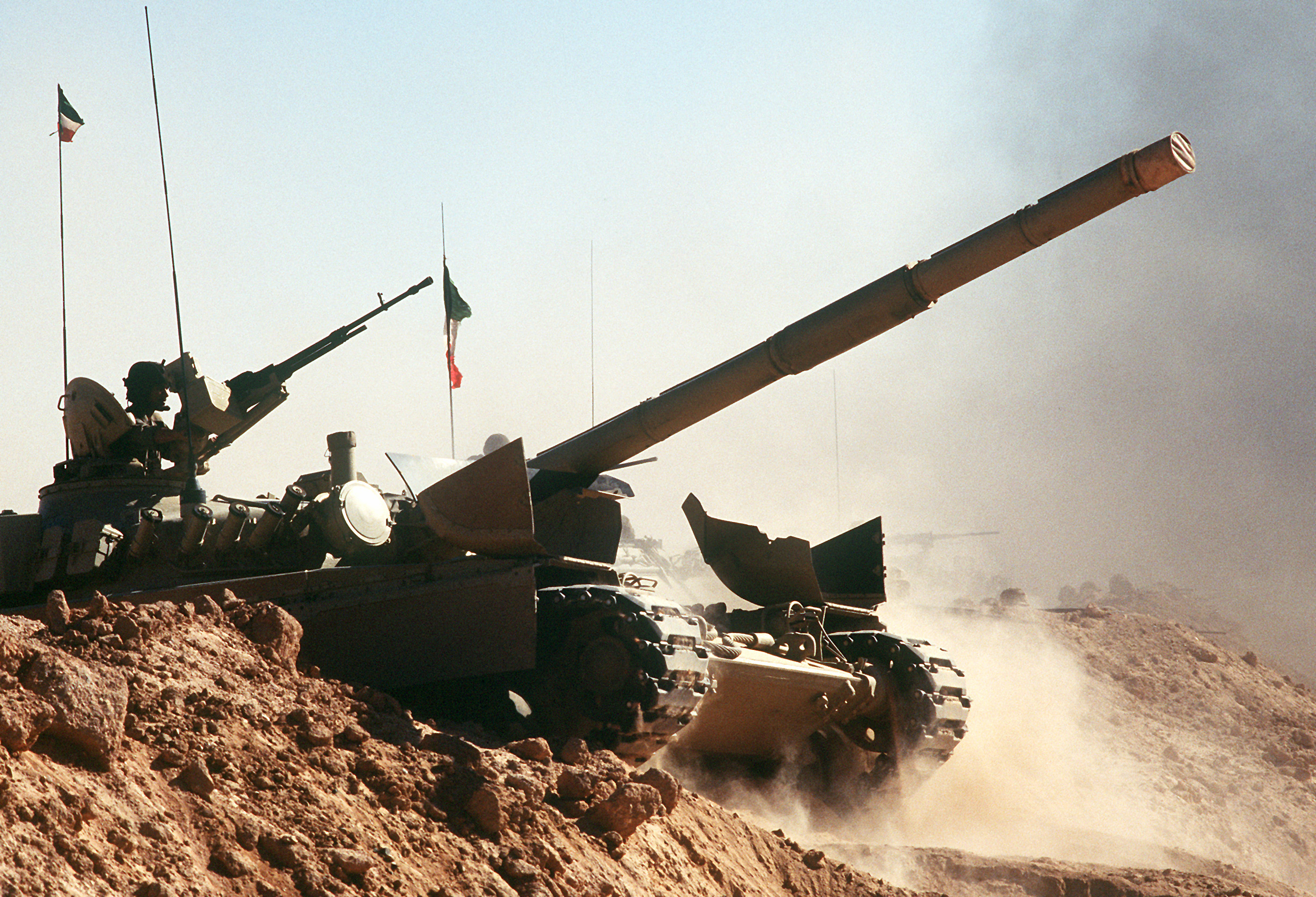
The song "Wainhom" from Shater (1999) was devoted to Kuwait's prisoners of war. Haddad lived most of her childhood in Kuwait until it was invaded by Iraq in 1990.

Haddad's first three records contained songs exclusively in Lebanese and Bedouin dialects, which defined her unique musical style during the early years. However, the release of Haddad's fourth studio album Yammaya in late 1998 saw a big change in Haddad's music. The album's lead single "Yammaya" incorporated ancient Egyptian beats, but still maintained a Bedouin dialect. Al-Abdul allotted a high budget for "Yammaya"'s music video which was shot in the Giza pyramid complex. Big part of the budget went to well-known Arab actors such as Muna Wassef and Sawsan Badr who appear in different roles in the video. The video takes place in ancient times Egypt where Haddad uses a witch (played by Wassef) to restore her throne from the current queen (played by Badr). The video also shows slaves moving to the music in a choreographied dance inspired by ancient Egypt. Both "Yammaya" and the second single from the album, "Emshi Wara Kidbohom", were able to become popular across the Arab world despite the poor promotion following the death of Haddad's mother at the time of album's release. "Emshi Wara Kidbohom" marks Haddad's first single ever in a dialect other than Lebanese or Bedouin. The song, performed in Egyptian dialect, ultimately became one of Haddad's most recognized hits in Egypt. Yammaya also included songs in Khaliji, Iraqi, and classical Arabic dialects.

In summer 1999, only a few months after the release of Yammya, Haddad released her fifth studio album Shater. The first single, "Shater", was one of the most popular singles in 1999 and was well received especially by toddlers for the use of the word "shater" meaning "clever", a word that is commonly associated with young children. The song was directed by Al-Abdul in Jebel Ali in Dubai. It featured peacocks, cocktails, and extras and dancers wearing colorful clothes in a sunny summer day. Due to lack of time, Haddad's plans to shoot the music video in a tropical island were canceled. Instead, a low budget music video was made for the song "Wainhom" back to back with "Shater". "Wainhom", while not Haddad's first song in a Khaliji dialect, is her first Khaliji music video. Haddad's first official Khaliji recording appears on her previous album Yammaya, a song called "Men Ghebt". "Wainhom", which was released a few months after the success of "Shater", is about the Kuwaiti prisoners of war who never came back from Iraq. Haddad dedicated the song to her childhood friends in Kuwait.

=== 2000–2003: Jarh Al Habib, Akhbar Helwa, and Law Yesaloni ===
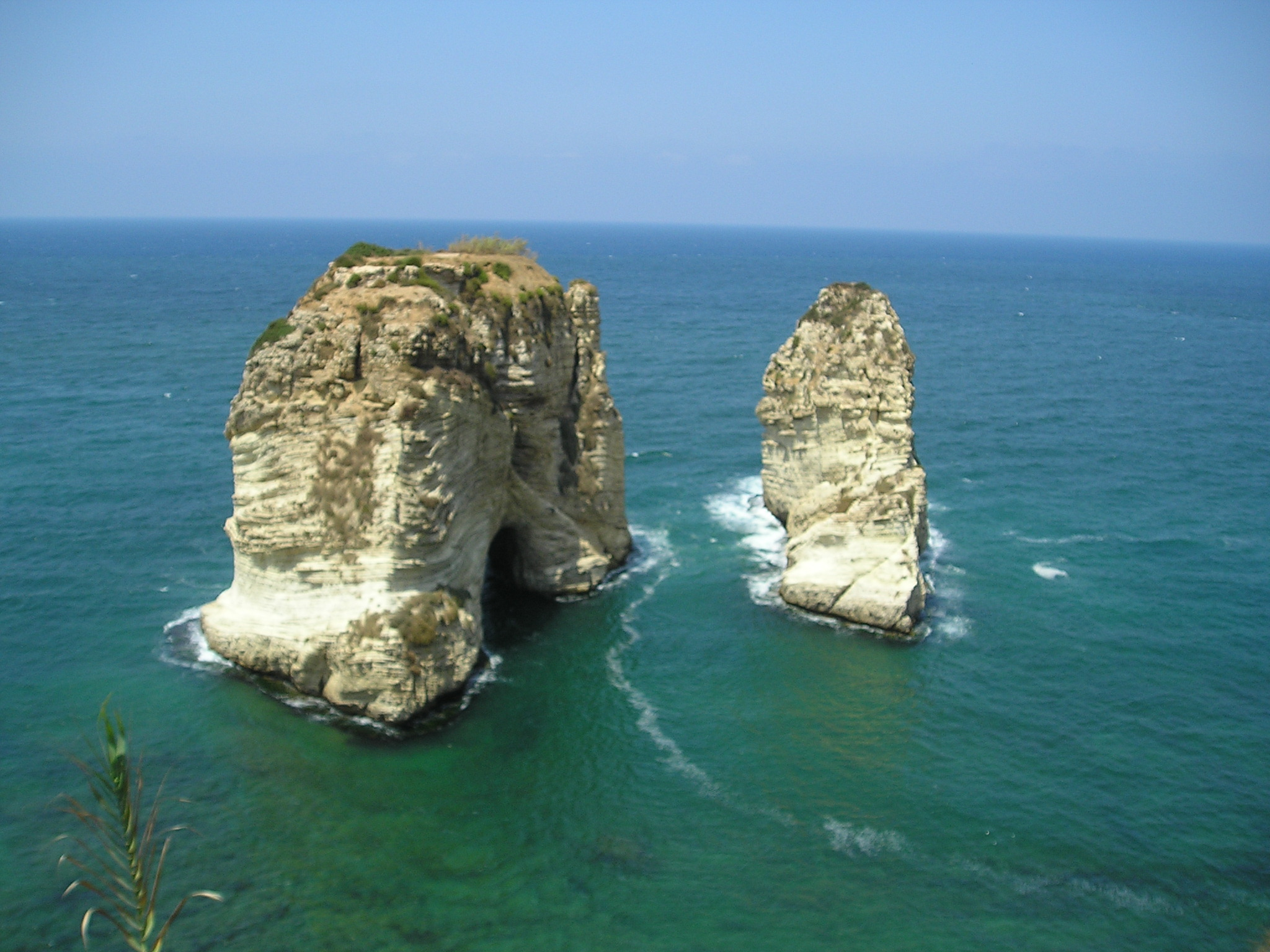
"Mani Mani" (2000) was shot in Haddad's home country of Lebanon. The city of Beirut attractions such as the Pigeons' Rock in Raouché can be seen several times in the video.

The final single from Shater, "Al Fosol Al Arba'a", another Khaliji song, was released as a music video in early 2000. The song, produced by Saudi musician Aseel Abu Bakr Salem, is about a love interest who changes instantly like the four seasons. The music video was shot in a green screen and used 3D graphics.

In summer 2000, the song "Mani Mani" was released as the lead single from Diana Haddad's sixth studio album Jarh Al Habib. Haddad returned to her home country of Lebanon for the music video of "Mani Mani" since the song combines Bedouin and Lebanese lyrics. The song contains unique arrangements and sound effects which contributed to its success. Jarh Al Habib saw a successful attempt to break into the Egyptian market again as it included four out of nine tracks in Egyptian dialect. One of these tracks is the title track "Jarh Al Habib" which is a duet with Egyptian Chaabi legend Mohammed Al Azabi. In early 2001, "Adlaa Alaik" was released as the second and final single from the album. The Khaliji song had limited success in Arab States of the Persian Gulf, although the music video featured a second appearance of Haddad's daughter Sophie, aged four years old at the time. Haddad's seventh studio album Akhbar Helwa followed in July 2001. "Elli Fe Bali" was the only music video to be released from the album. This is Haddad's first upbeat music video in Egyptian dialect, which helped it become more popular across the Arab world. The music video, which is set in 1972, draws heavy influences from the popular musical Grease (1978). Stallions Records, Haddad's label since her debut, was sold to Rotana Records in 2002, which impeded any further promotion of the album. However, several greatest hits albums were released by Stallions including a DVD release with most of Haddad's music videos in 2003. In addition to Stallions' sale, Haddad suffered a miscarriage and was sued by Lebanese rival Nawal Al Zoghbi, which also affected the promotion campaign of Akhbar Helwa in 2001.

Al Zoghbi sued Haddad due to her and her husband's accusations that Al Zoghbi pays more attention to her looks than her music and that she is just a "performer". Al Zoghbi took the couple to court in Lebanon on grounds of "emotional distress" she suffered as a result of Al-Abdul and Haddad's criticism. Al-Abdul also stated that Al Zoghbi's voice was "out of tune". However, in 2002 the court rejected Al Zoghbi's case and the ruling stated that "the statements made by Al-Abdul and Haddad are not classified as defamation of the claimant as it does not have any impact on her basic artistic position but is rather linked with her performance. The claim that the plaintiff is a singer or performer is a flexible classification that conforms to personal standards".

Haddad signed a contract with Egyptian label Alam El Phan in 2002 and released her first album with the company Law Yesaloni in June. Law Yesaloni marks Haddad's first full studio album in Khaliji dialects. The album incorporates styles from almost all the different Arab countries of the Persian Gulf. For example, the track "Kama Kom" is heavily influenced by Omani music, a style that is rarely found in mainstream Khaliji music. One music video was released from this album for the song "Law Yesaloni", which is a duet with Emirati newcomer Eida Al Menhali who went on to become one of the most popular Emirati Chaabi musicians.

=== 2004–2007: Awel Marrah and Diana 2006 ===
On 12 March 2004, "Waily", the lead single from Haddad's ninth studio album Awel Marrah (2004), was premiered on the reality talent show Star Academy Arab World on LBC. The album, which was initially titled Diana 2003, faced many delays prior to its release. It was originally set for a summer 2003 release. The president of Alam El Phan records, Mohsen Gaber, explained the reason behind the delay is that Haddad spent two years "perfecting" her new album which in his opinion makes her "a genuine artist that his company will do everything in their hands to promote". To make up for the delay, three tracks from Awel Marrah were shot back-to-back as music videos with Haddad's husband Suhail Al-Abdul. These include "Waily", "Saheby", and the title track "Awel Marrah". "Waily" music video was premiered with the album's release in June 2004. The video, which features Kuwaiti actress Mona Shaddad, follows a storyline that is Haddad's idea. Some of "Waily"'s scenes were shot at Dubai International Airport while most of the video takes place in a school basketball court. Haddad's leg was injured during the shooting of a scene in the video where Haddad's is dunking. Haddad's broken leg appears in the airport scene of the video. "Saheby", a cover of a song by Emirati folklore artist Ahmed Al-Shibani, was premiered in summer 2004 as well. During this summer, a promotional party was held in Cairo where Haddad performed a number of the album's tracks. The concert was later shown on Gaber's newly launched channel Mazzika. After the success of "Waily" and "Saheby" music videos in the summer of 2004, "Awel Marrah" video premiered in November 2004. A music video for "Khaleny Saktah" was also set to be directed by Egyptian director Ahmed Al-Mahdi in Cairo, but Haddad had to leave Egypt for Lebanon due to her father illness. Hence, the project was canceled altogether. If went through, "Khaleny Saktah" could have been Haddad's first music video with a director other than her husband. However, in early 2005, Haddad finally collaborated with a different director for the music video of the Lebanese track "Law Ma Dakhalt Ebrasi". The song was released as the fourth and final single from the album before Haddad went into another hiatus to record her tenth studio album.

In December 2004, Haddad and Al Zoghbi overcame their differences when Haddad took the initiative and made a personal phone call to Al Zoghbi after hearing that she was experiencing a downfall in her health. Haddad revealed that she felt it was her duty to call and wish Al Zoghbi a quick recovery. Al Zoghbi was grateful towards Haddad for putting all the disputes aside. The two artists appeared on the cover of Zahrat Al Khaleej magazine in an issue that featured a photoshoot of Haddad and Al Zoghbi together. They also began to form a mutual respect for one another.

On 24 June 2005, Haddad performed a new track from her upcoming studio album at the finale of the talent show Nojoom Al Khaleej which used to broadcast on Al-Abdul's channel Nojoom. The song, entitled "Hassafah", is a Khaliji track that later appeared on Haddad's tenth studio album Diana 2006. The album was released simultaneously with the lead single "Mas & Louly" in March 2006. For this record, Haddad had to break up with her former label Alam El Phan which kept on postponing the album release for months. A last-minute decision, the album was finally released under her husband's Al-Abdul records company. However, Al-Abdul was a newly established company at the time and only focused on the Persian Gulf area. Therefore, Haddad signed contracts with multiple labels to ensure distribution of the album across the Arab world. These include Melody Music in Egypt and EMI Music Arabia in other countries. "Mas & Louly" became an instant hit due to its simple lyrics which are performed in a dialect that can be understood by most people in the Arab world. It also featured Algerian raï musician Cheb Khaled which gave the song an international feel. No more music videos were released from the album due to the 2006 Lebanon War until later in the year when the song "Zay El Sokar" premiered in late October coinciding with Eid al-Fitr. Before the war, a Khaliji non-album single entitled "Badr Al Bdour" was performed in Nojoom Al Khaleej second-season finale. When the war started in July, Haddad was in the Emirates with her family. However, she paid a tribute to Lebanon by shooting a music video for two of her old tracks "Ana Al Ensan" and "Maghdouche" which appear on Yammaya (1998) and Jarh Al Habib (2000), respectively, in the form of a medley. Haddad worked with the Egyptian director Yaser Sami for the first time on "Zay El Sokar" music video which helped make the Egyptian song popular in Egypt. The Egyptian ballad "Aadi" was shot with Lebanese director Leila Kanaan earlier in 2006 but was not released until early 2007.

=== 2008–2010: Men Diana Illa and divorce ===
"I love Dubai,". "You can find everything here – it's a cultural city. I even performed for Dubai's National Day in 2006. That was a big event for me"

— Diana Haddad,
Ahlan!, 2007.

In late 2008, Haddad announced the release of her eleventh studio album (and second Khaliji album) Men Diana Illa. Despite the difficulty for a non-Khaliji artist to break into the Gulf market with Khaliji music, Haddad managed to break that barrier and stereotype. She has been somewhat "adopted" into Emirati culture and society. Two music videos were released from Men Diana Illa, both of which were directed by Haddad's friend Nahla Al-Fahd. The lead single, "Sheft Itessalek", was premiered on Al-Abdul's channel Nojoom in October 2008 coinciding with Eid al-Adha. Before the release of the second music video from the album, a track in Lebanese dialect entitled "Ya Aibo" was released in early 2009. "Ya Aibo" was also directed by Al-Fahd in Beirut. The song proved successful in Lebanon, although it received mixed criticism for its unusual lyrics and imagery. "Ya Aibo" is a diss to old men who, in spite of being grandparents, spend their time hitting on young girls and cheating on their wives. Haddad sends a message to these men to respect their age and behave well to set an example for their grandkids. Some critics hated the comedy approach Haddad took in the song and the video, while others praised the idea. This was Haddad's last single before she announced her separation from her husband Suhail Al-Abdul in August after over a decade together.

After the divorce, Haddad decided to get busy in a mini summer tour in 2009, beginning with two concerts in France and Morocco. The concert in Morocco was a part of Al Mydiak Festival, which is held annually in honor of the King Crowning Day. Haddad set a record in the festival's history for attracting more than 150,000 people. After a concert in Algeria, Haddad ended the tour in Lebanon with two concerts. One of these concerts was Haddad's first show ever in her hometown of Maghdouche. Her concert attracted more than 6,000 people from all over Lebanon. Footage from the concert can be seen in the second music video from Men Diana Illa, "Ya Zalan". The video also shows footage of Haddad enjoying her life as a single woman in various locations such as the beach and the recording studio.

=== 2011–2015: Bent Osol and Ya Bashar ===
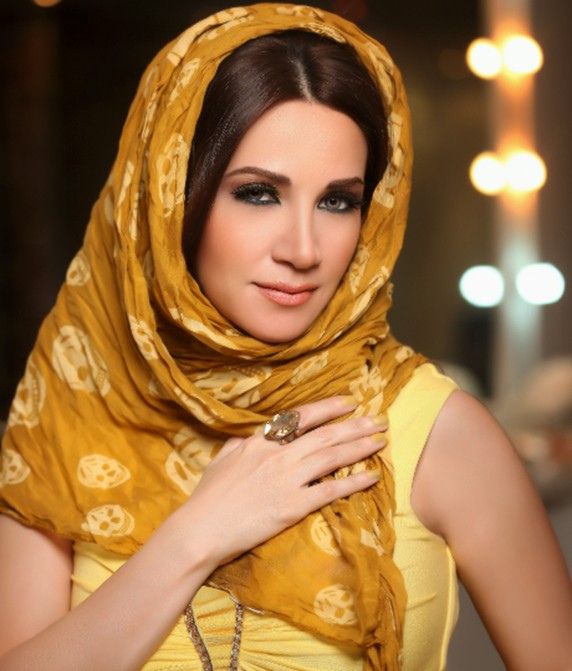
Diana Haddad in 2013.

In 2009, Haddad revealed she was working on a duet with an R&B artist later revealed to be Alicia Keys for her twelfth studio album. The plans for the duet fell through when Keys asked for 1,500,000 dollars which Haddad couldn't afford. After over three years in hiatus, Haddad announced the release of her twelfth studio album Bent Osol in December 2011. Number of singles were released prior to the announcement including an Egyptian Islamic song for Ramadan 2010 called "Ya Hadieh Min Rabna", the Khaliji track "Majnona" in November 2010, and another Khaliji track entitled "Gaalat Diana" in May 2011. Hadded also recorded a song entitled "Ya Wagt" for the opening credits of the Kuwaiti soap Al Dakhila which premiered in Ramadan 2011. Only "Ya Wagt" and "Gaalat Diana" were included on Bent Osol (2011). The album was independently funded by Haddad after her breakup with her husband. Furthermore, an agreement was signed with Platinum Records to distribute the album across the Arab World and promote it through its affiliated TV and radio channels which includes MBC, Wanasah, and MBC FM. MBC FM premiered the song "Enta Ma'ai (Kol Hayati)" which features Lebanese-Canadian R&B musician Karl Wolf ten days prior to the album release.

In late 2013, Haddad signed a record deal with Arab world's largest music label Rotana. Her first album with the company was released in December 2014 under the title Ya Bashar. The album was preceded by the release of number of singles including "Albi Wafi" in 2012, "Naam Seedi", "El Kathab", "Thaleth Alaaiad" and the Moroccan hit "La Fiesta" in 2013, and "Hala We Ahleen" and "Habebi Masry" in 2014. All of these single were released as music videos and only "Hala We Ahleen" made it into Ya Bashar. Haddad supported the album with three more music videos for the songs "Haflet Hob", "Elard Ghanat (Megana)", and "Ya Bashar" throughout 2015. Haddad made her music production debut on the album on a track called "Farhet Qalbi", although she had an uncredited co-production on her 2012 single "Ya Baad Omri". In June 2015, Haddad was presented with an honorary award at the 2015 Murex D'Or in Lebanon for her contribution in music.

=== 2016–present: "Ela Hona" ===
In 2016, Haddad stopped promoting Ya Bashar and started releasing more singles including a duet with Lebanese musician Assi El Helani entitled "Romeo & Juliet". She also released a cover of Kuwaiti singer Mohammed Almesbah song "Tibassam". During the summer of 2016, Haddad released a project with Saudi social media personalities Darin Albayed and Zied ِAlswaida under the title "Nisfi Althani". On January 1, 2017, radio stations across the Arab world premiered the single "Taabr Qalbi." The song marks Haddad's return to Lebanese dialect since her 2012 single "Albi Wafi." A lyric video for the song was uploaded to Haddad's YouTube account five days later. Another Lebanese song and its accompanying music video entitled "Nayma Bel Asal", produced by Saudi composer Talal, was premiered on Talal YouTube channel on August 13, 2017.

Haddad shot a song called "Ela Hona" back-to-back with "Nayma Bel Asal" in Tbilisi, Georgia with her director friend Nahla Al-Fahad. The video, which premiered on October 11, 2017, is Haddad's first Iraqi music video in four years since "El Kathab" in 2013. During 2018, the song gained popularity in a slow manner due to it being covered by underground Iraqi artists including the producer of the song Ali Saber. It became a sleeper hit gaining over 100 million hits on YouTube as of early 2020. Due to the unexpected popularity of the song, Haddad postponed any plans for albums or major singles. Haddad released the follow-up single, "Ahebak W Katha", in July 2019 with the same team that produced "Ela Hona". In early September 2019, Hadded followed "Ahebak W Katha" up with another single in Egyptian dialect entitled "Gamalo". This marks Haddad's first track in Egyptian since "Habebi Masry", Haddad's debut single with Rotana, in October 2014. On February 10, 2020, Hadded premiered the new music video of a track called "Ma Had Yehes Bi ElAasheq". The new track, performed in Bedouin Arabic dialect, is supposedly the lead single off Hadded's upcoming fourteenth studio album. Haddad, who has been speaking fondly of the song since 2018, claimed that the song "will recreate the glory of the single "Ahl Al Esheg" released in 1997".

== Personal life ==
Haddad comes from the southern Lebanese town of Maghdouche, although born in the Mountain town of Bsalim. The track "Maghdouche" from her sixth studio album Jarh Al Habib was devoted to her hometown.

In the 1990s, Haddad married Emirati businessman Suhail Al-Abdul. Together, they have two daughters: Sophie (born 19 July 1996) and Mira (born 26 November 2007). Haddad was Al-Abdul's second wife. The couple were divorced in August 2009. Haddad explained that she is on good terms with her ex-husband and they agreed to share custody of their children.

When Haddad was still a teenager when she married Al-Abdul, who was an older and richer music director and businessman from the UAE. She was criticized by the press who called her marriage a marriage of convenience. Haddad has always stated that her marriage was out of love and not for wealth. However, in 2012, three years after their divorce, she recognized that she was far too young to marry and despite being in love, she was not fully grown up.

In 1999, it was reported that Haddad had officially embraced Islam in honour of her deceased Muslim mother Mouna who died in 1998. She went on to do Umrah that same year in Mecca. It was also reported that her decision was met with strong opposition from her Maronite Christian father and some of her relatives. Eventually, her father respected her decision. She is the only one of her siblings who practices Islam.

Haddad rarely speaks openly about her religious beliefs stating that these matters "are personal and only between her and God." Prior to her official conversion, Haddad did thorough research into Islam. She once stated in an interview with Al-Jareema magazine that attending the lectures of Islamic scholars Sheikh Al-Shrawi and Tarek Swaed is also what motivated her to convert. Haddad describes herself as a "private, yet observant Muslim" who prays, reads the Qur'an and fasts during Ramadan. She denied rumours that she embraced Sufism or returned to Christianity after her divorce. Haddad's father died in late 2011, thirteen years after the death of his wife Mouna. The track "Rajaa Al Sheti" on the 2011 album Bent Osol was devoted to Haddad's parents.

Hadded has lived in Dubai since she married Al-Abdul, but she frequently visits her native Lebanon when possible as she owns real estate there. In one of her visits in late 2009, Haddad and her driver were attacked by armed militant bandits in Beirut who demanded everyone in the car to get out. Haddad's driver refused to obey the demands of the criminals and made a daring, yet life saving quick exit and escaped. The militants attempted to catch up with them but failed. Haddad called the incident traumatic and said she was not able to sleep for days afterwards. It is believed that their motives were to steal the car. In March 2010, Haddad admitted that she had not voted in the Lebanese general election of 2009 stating that she currently "lives in the United Arab Emirates" and that she hopes that "God protects every Lebanese official who puts Lebanon over his personal interests."

When it comes to body image issues, Haddad revealed that she was not against plastic surgery as long as it was not exaggerated and admitted to having a nose job. Haddad is noted to being quite petite in size and height.

=== Philanthropy ===
Haddad has been involved in humanitarian work in areas such as social and political crises. In 2000, upon the uprising of the Palestinian Intifada, Haddad released a song dedicated to the Palestinian cause called "Al Haq Yaktubo Min Dami" (Arabic: the truth is written with my blood). She cancelled a scheduled fifteen US tour dates in solidarity with the Palestinian people.

In 2003, Haddad contributed to a campaign against drugs and smoking in the UAE by releasing a single called "Bi Edak El Qarar" (Arabic: the decision is in your hands). She was chosen to be part of the campaign by the organizers of the project due to her influence on young Emirati people. The video was directed by Suhail Al-Abdul.

In 2007 she took part in a charity concert held by the American CHF firm in UAE along with Assi el Helani, Youri Mrakkadi, and Bassem Feghali. The money raised from the concert went to Lebanese children. A year later, she was honored by Al Rashid Care Center for her work with handicapped children.

In 2008, Haddad was offered a part in the charity single "El Dameer Al Arabi" (Arabic: the Arab conscience) performed by a charity supergroup. The song is about the dire situation of the Middle East and Arab world including the Palestinian-Israeli conflict and Iraq War. "El Dameer Al Arabi" is considered a sequel to "Al Helm Al Arabi" ("The Arab Dream"), a project performed by a different supergroup in 1997 that included Haddad. Many of the original participants agreed to take part again including Asala Nasri and Ahlam. Haddad declined the offer and explained the reason behind her decision in the TV show Tarattatta that "patriotic songs proved useless and vain in the Arab world."

== Discography ==
=== Studio albums ===
- Saken (1996)
- Ahl Al Esheg (1997)
- Ammanih (1997)
- Yammaia (1998)
- Shater (1999)
- Jarh Al Habib (2000)
- Akhbar Helwa (2001)
- Law Yesaloni (2002)
- Awel Marrah (2004)
- Diana 2006 (2006)
- Men Diana Illa (2008)
- Bent Osol (2011)
- Ya Bashar (2014)

=== Live albums ===
- Anida (1996)

=== Compilation albums ===
- Best of Diana Haddad (2002)
- Best of Diana Haddad 2 (2003)

=== Singles ===
==== 1990s ====
Title	Year	Album	Director	Dialect
"Tayr Al Yammameh"	1992	Saken	—N/a	Lebanese Arabic
"Saken"	1996	Saken	Suhail Al-Abdul	Bedouin Arabic
"Lagetek"	1996	Saken	Suhail Al-Abdul	Bedouin Arabic
"Al-Sahra"	1996	Saken	Suhail Al-Abdul	Lebanese Arabic
"Anida"	1996	Ahl Al Esheg	—N/a	Lebanese Arabic
"Ahl Al Esheg"	1997	Ahl Al Esheg	Suhail Al-Abdul	Bedouin Arabic
"Bizaal Minak"	1997	Ahl Al Esheg	Suhail Al-Abdul	Lebanese Arabic
"Ammanih"	1997	Ammanih	Suhail Al-Abdul	Bedouin Arabic
"Ya Benti"	1998	Ammanih	Suhail Al-Abdul	Lebanese Arabic
"Yammaia"	1998	Yammaia	Suhail Al-Abdul	Sa'idi Arabic
"Emshi Wara Kidbohom"	1998	Yammaia	Suhail Al-Abdul	Egyptian Arabic
"Awqed Al Shamaa"	1999	—N/a	Suhail Al-Abdul	Classical Arabic
"Shater"	1999	Shater	Suhail Al-Abdul	Bedouin Arabic
"Wainhom"	1999	Shater	Suhail Al-Abdul	Khaleeji Arabic

==== 2000s ====
Title	Year	Album	Director	Dialect
"Al Fosol Al Arba'a"	2000	Shater	Suhail Al-Abdul	Khaleeji Arabic
"Mish B'edi"	2000	—N/a	Unknown	Lebanese Arabic
"Mani Mani"	2000	Jarh Al Habib	Suhail Al-Abdul	Bedouin Arabic
"Al Haq Yaktubo Min Dami"	2000	—N/a	Suhail Al-Abdul	Classical Arabic
"Mnawer Bladik"	2001	—N/a	Suhail Al-Abdul	Khaleeji Arabic
"Adlaa Alaik"	2001	Jarh Al Habib	Suhail Al-Abdul	Khaleeji Arabic
"Elli Fe Bali"	2001	Akhbar Helwa	Suhail Al-Abdul	Egyptian Arabic
"Law Yesaloni"	2002	Law Yesaloni	Suhail Al-Abdul	Khaleeji Arabic
"Beedak El Qarar"	2003	—N/a	Suhail Al-Abdul	Classical Arabic
"Waily"	2004	Awel Marrah	Suhail Al-Abdul	Bedouin Arabic
"Saheby"	2004	Awel Marrah	Suhail Al-Abdul	Khaleeji Arabic
"Awel Marrah"	2004	Awel Marrah	Suhail Al-Abdul	Egyptian Arabic
"Law Ma Dakhalt Ebrasi"	2005	Awel Marrah	Sophie Boutros	Lebanese Arabic
"Hassafah"	2005	Diana 2006	Saed Mousa	Khaleeji Arabic
"Mas & Louly"	2006	Diana 2006	Leila Kanaan	Bedouin Arabic
"Badr Al Bdour"	2006	—N/a	Saed Mousa	Khaleeji Arabic
"Ana Al Ensan"	2006	Yammaia	Nahla Al-Fahad	Classical Arabic
"Maghdouche"	2006	Jarh Al Habib	Nahla Al-Fahad	Lebanese Arabic
"Zay El Sokar"	2006	Diana 2006	Yaser Sami	Egyptian Arabic
"Aadi"	2007	Diana 2006	Leila Kanaan	Egyptian Arabic
"Ma Nysetak"	2007	—N/a	Saed Mousa	Khaleeji Arabic
"Azab El Hawa"	2008	Diana 2006	Nahla Al-Fahad	Syrian Arabic
"Hobi Emirate"	2008	—N/a	Unknown	Khaleeji Arabic
"Sheft Itessalek"	2008	Men Diana Illa	Nahla Al-Fahad	Khaleeji Arabic
"Ya Aybo"	2009	Kello Jdid 2009	Nahla Al-Fahad	Lebanese Arabic
"Ya Zalan"	2009	Men Diana Illa	Nahla Al-Fahad	Khaleeji Arabic

==== 2010s ====
Title	Year	Album	Director	Dialect
"Ya Hadieh Min Rabna"	2010	—N/a	Mohammad Jum'ah	Egyptian Arabic
"Majnona"	2010	—N/a	Walid Nassif	Khaleeji Arabic
"Gaalat Diana"	2011	Bent Osol	Fadi Haddad	Khaleeji Arabic
"Wadi Haki"	2012	Bent Osol	Nahla Al-Fahad	Khaleeji Arabic
"Albi Wafi"	2012	—N/a	Jad Shwery	Lebanese Arabic
"Naam Seedi"	2013	—N/a	Yaqoob Yusuf Al-Mahanna	Khaleeji Arabic
"El Kathab"	2013	—N/a	Adel Serhan	Iraqi Arabic
"Thaleth Alaaiad"	2013	—N/a	Fadi Haddad	Khaleeji Arabic
"La Fiesta"	2014	—N/a	Clément Chabault	Moroccan Arabic
"Hala We Ahleen"	2014	Ya Bashar	Yasser Al-Yasseri	Khaleeji Arabic
"Habebi Masry"	2014	—N/a	Majdi Kharof/Mohammed Abduljawad	Egyptian Arabic
"Haflet Hob"	2015	Ya Bashar	Fadi Haddad	Khaleeji Arabic
"Elard Ghanat (Megana)"	2015	Ya Bashar	Fadi Haddad	Khaleeji Arabic
"Ya Bashar"	2015	Ya Bashar	Fadi Haddad	Bedouin Arabic
"Romeo & Juliet"	2016	—N/a	Alaa Al Ansari	Bedouin Arabic
"Tibassam"	2016	—N/a	Yasser Al-Yasseri	Khaleeji Arabic
"Nisfi Althani"	2016	—N/a	Anwar Al-Yasseri	Khaleeji Arabic
"Taabr Qalbi"	2017	—N/a	Lyric video	Lebanese Arabic
"Nayma Bel Asal"	2017	—N/a	Nahla Al-Fahad	Lebanese Arabic
"Ela Hona"	2017	—N/a	Nahla Al-Fahad	Iraqi Arabic
"Ahebak W Katha"	2019	—N/a	Lyric video	Iraqi Arabic
"Gamalo"	2019	—N/a	Lyric video	Egyptian Arabic

==== 2020s ====
Title	Year	Album	Director	Dialect
"Ma Had Yehes Bi Elaasheq"	2020	—N/a	Shehab	Bedouin Arabic
"Msh Rah Nkhtlif"	2020	—N/a	Nahla Al-Fahad	Lebanese Arabic
"Aasheg Dhamian"	2021	—N/a	Nahla Al-Fahad	Khaleeji Arabic
"Sayed El Hamga"	2022	—N/a	Nahla Al-Fahad	Khaleeji Arabic

=== Duets ===
Year	Collaborated With	Title	Album	Video Clip Director	Language/Dialect
1997	Various Artists	Al Helm Al Arabi	N/A		Arabic
1998	Wael Kfoury	Waseyet Hob	N/A	Special concert performance only	Lebanese Arabic
2000	Mohammed El-Azabi	Jarh Al Habib	Jarh Al Habib	Unfilmed	Egyptian Arabic
2001	Rashid Al-Majed	Ard Al Emirates/Emirates Land of Peace	N/A	Televised Concert	Khaleeji Arabic English introduction verses
2001	Jad Nakhle	Wily Mennak	N/A	Televised Studio Live performance	Bedouin Arabic
2001	Rashid Al-Majed	Asma Bilad	N/A	unreleased	Khaleeji Arabic
2002	Aitha Al Menhali	Law Yesaloni	Law Yesaloni	Suhail Al-abdool	Khaleeji Arabic
2006	Cheb Khaled	Mas w Louli	Diana 2006	Leila Kanaan	Lebanese (Haddad) & Algerian Arabic (Cheb Khaled)
2010	Karl Wolf	Enta Maai Kol Hayati	Bent Osol	Fadi Haddad	English (Wolf) and Lebanese Arabic (Haddad)

==== Special Recordings/Live Tracks ====
- Lematha Al Moshtaka
- Al Helm Al Arabi
- Ya Rayheen Ommi (1997)
- Jabalak Kanz (live in concert ) (1998)
- Mush Beedi (1999)
- Ya Carthage (2000)
- Naam Zayed (2001)
- Ard El Emarat (2001)
- Wily Mennak (2001)
- Asma Bilad
- Roof Roohi (2002)
- El Lilah Ghair (2002)
- Noor Aini (2002)
- Ela Falastin... (2002) (Live)
- Saat Kheir (2003)
- Ainawi (2003)
- Yal Samra (2003)
- Lgenawi (2003)
- Ya Keef Al Rooh (2003)
- Ya Fakr
- Ya Baad Omri
- Enta Al Shams (2001) (Song most famously by Najwa Karam) (Unreleased Studio Recording)
- Al EIn Molayetin (2005) (Live in concert in Algeria)
- Lanat Emaraa (Theme Song for a Drama in Bahrain) (2008)
- Yal Samra (2003)
