= Bent Osol =

Studio album by Diana Haddad
- Released: December 25, 2011
- Recorded: 2009–2011 (Dubai, United Arab Emirates)
- Genre: Pop, dance-pop, electropop, R&B, Khaliji, Mawwal
- Length: 54:20
- Language: Arabic, English
- Label: Platinum Records
- Producer: Fahd Al Naser, Hosam Kamal, Ashraf Salem, Karl Wolf, Hamad Rashid Al Khodr, Omar Basel, Wessam Al Amir, Yaser Jalal, Ahmad Mohyee

Diana Haddad chronology
Men Diana Illa (2008)	Bent Osol (2011)	Ya Bashar (2014)

Singles from Bent Osol
- 1. "Galat Diana" Released: 30 May 2011; 2. "Ya Wagt" Released: 24 July 2011; 3. "Kol Hayati" Released: 17 December 2011; 4. "Yesh'had Allah" Released: 18 December 2011; 5. "Wadi Haki" Released: 6 April 2012

Bent Osol (English: A Good Girl) is the twelfth studio album by Lebanese recording artist Diana Haddad. The album was released by Platinum Records Christmas 2011. Bent Osol marks Haddad's first album in various Arabic dialects since her 2006 self-titled album Diana 2006 (2006).

== Background and development ==
In 2008, Haddad announced the inclusion of a duet with a well-known R&B female artist on her upcoming twelfth studio album. The announcement came after Haddad's performance at the Mawazine festival which lead the press to speculate that the act Haddad referred to was Whitney Houston as they both performed during the same night in the festival. However, later that year Haddad revealed that the artist she was hoping to duet with was Alicia Keys who asked a large amount of money for the duet that Haddad refused to pay. According to Yamazaj newspaper, Keys asked for a million and a half US dollars for the duet.

Haddad first revealed the theme of the album in 2009 when she recorded a song with Canadian artist Karl Wolf.

== Release and promotion ==
The album faced many delays prior to its release due to reasons such as Haddad's divorce in summer 2009 and the death of her father in October 2011. Eventually, Haddad's official Facebook account announced the release of the album on December 14, 2011

Haddad paid for the album production herself, but Rashed Al-Majed's label, Platinum Records, took care of the promotion and the distribution of the album in the Arab world. By December 15, 2011, Middle East Broadcasting Center channels aired several promos for the album's release.

As a part of the album's promotion, Haddad appeared on the new show "Hatha Ana" with the TV personality Rania Bargoth on January 23, 2012. The episode was set to air on the 16th but it was delayed due to an Arab Idol live episode. She also appeared on two different shows, "Taw Al Lail" and "Banat O Bas" on the Kuwaiti channel Al-Watan where she talked about her new release and performed some of the album's songs on January 18, 2012 and January 22, 2012. Haddad made an appearance at the Marina FM studios in Kuwait.

During her visit in Kuwait it was announced that Haddad will be performing along with Nawal El Kuwaiti and Nabil Shoail on the fourth night of Hala February, a popular Kuwaiti festival that started in the late 1990s. However, it was announced on February 8, 2012 that all the concerts have been canceled due to the Syrian uprising.

== Singles ==
"Kol Hayati", featuring Karl Wolf, was released as the lead single from the album. It premiered in the United Arab Emirates on Panorama FM radio on December 15, 2011. Haddad talked about the song in number of occasions to the press since 2009. Zaharat Al Khaleej magazine covered the recording process of the song in one of its issues.

Although Haddad released number of singles before the album's release including "Galat Diana" in 2011, "Majnona" in 2010, and "Ya Aibo" in 2009, none of them is considered a lead single and only "Galat Diana" is included on the album.

The Kuwaiti soap opera song "Al Dakhila" also known as "Ya Wagt" is included on the album. Al Dakhila is a ramadan 2011 soap opera starring Huda Hussain and Hind Al Bloshi.

"Galat Diana" is considered the first music video from the album. It premiered on May 30, 2011. The music video shows Haddad wearing 12 different costumes and looks representing the 12 zodiac signs.

The second music video from the album, "Wadi Haki", premiered on April 6, 2012.

== Critical reception ==
The album received positive to mixed reviews by critics. Generally, the album has been negatively criticized for having more songs in Khaliji dialect than any other dialect especially Egyptian and Lebanese which are more popular in the Arab World than Khaliji. Bashar Zaidan from Beljaw electronic magazine thought that "Eah Rayak", a song in Egyptian dialect, was the highlight of the album and that the big number of Khaliji songs hurt the album. Haddad's previous singles and album Men Diana Illa (2008) were all in Khaliji dialects. He criticized the song "Kol Hayati" lyrics for being "too common" and not surprising and suggested a fresh music video to handle this problem. He added: the song doesn't compare to "Mass And Louly" from Diana 2006 (2006) which was a huge surprise and a big hit.

Zaidan mentioned that the album reminded him to the old 1990s Diana. He also mentioned that the song "Esmaa Kalamhom" sounds similar to Haddad's single "Emshi Wara Kidbohom" from Yammaia (1998). In terms of lyrics, Haddad's divorce affected the selection of the lyrics and most of the songs on the album are about betrayal, Zaidan said.

== Track listing ==
No.	Title	Writer(s)	Producer(s)	Length
1.	"Bel Raha Alaya" (Egyptian)	Abdullah Al Omani	Fahd Al Naser	4:08
2.	"Wadi Haki" (Khaliji)	Deyaa Al Mayali	Hosam Kamal	3:59
3.	"Bent Osol" (Lebanese)	Yaser Jalal	Yaser Jalal	3:38
4.	"Esmaa Kalamhom" (Egyptian)	Mostafa Morsi	Ashraf Salem	4:27
5.	"Kol Hayati" (Lebanese Arabic and English, featuring Karl Wolf)	Karl Wolf, Yaser Jalal	Karl Wolf	4:12
6.	"Galat Diana" (Khaliji Arabic)	Ali Al Khawar	Fahd Al Naser	3:06
7.	"Tob Al Farah" (Lebanese Arabic)	Yaser Jalal	Yaser Jalal	3:31
8.	"Ya Hath Galbi" (Khaliji Arabic)	Abdulrazzaq Al Eissa	Hamad Rashid Al Khodr	3:48
9.	"Rajaa Al Sheti"	Yaser Jalal	Yaser Jalal	5:01
10.	"Ya Wagt" (Khaliji Arabic, Al Dakhila original soundtrack)	Ali Al Khawar	Fahd Al Naser	4:13
11.	"Eeh Rayak" (Egyptian Arabic)	Wael Tawfik	Ahmad Mohyee	4:33
12.	"Kaid Al Nesaa" (Khaliji Arabic)	Moshref Al Atabi	Omar Basel	3:45
13.	"Rajaa Al Sheti" (Lebanese Arabic, Mawwal)	Yaser Jalal	Yaser Jalal	2:00
14.	"Yesh'had Allah" (Lebanese Arabic)	Hussain Ali Ismail	Wessam Al Amir	4:02

== Personnel ==
Personnel credits adapted from the album's booklet.

- Diana Haddad – vocals, backing vocals
- Helmi Basheer - supervision
- Fahd Al Naser - musical supervision
- David Abdullah - photography, concept, and design
- Yaser Jalal - executive producer
- Mohammed Harb - coordinator
- Alaa Faiad - co-coordinator
- Ahmad Saleh - co-coordinator

== Release history ==
Region	Date	Label	Format
Saudi Arabia	December 25, 2011	Platinum Records	CD
Arab World	December 26, 2011	Platinum Records	CD
