= Vice Verset =

Canadian hip hop duo

- Origin: Montreal, Quebec, Canada
- Genres: Rap, hip hop
- Years active: 1997–2006
- Label: HLM Records
- Members: David Dubé (Da Vincy); Striger Laurent (Striger)
- Past members: Grégory Jean-Marie (Frank Castle)

Vice Verset was a Canadian bilingual French / English hip hop band duo established in 1997 and made up of rapper David Dubé (also known as Da Vincy) and of Striger Laurent, a Canadian artist of Jamaican origin (using the mononym Striger). The band was signed to HLM Records.

The band took part in many competitions and appeared in Rap City '97 finishing third overall. They were named best French rap group for the year in Quebec and took part extensively in many music events like Rockon 1998 dance competition and in Les FrancoFolies de Montréal in 2005.

Vice Verset released the album Vice City in 2006 on HLM Records. The lyrics were by Da Vincy, Striger and Vice Verset and was produced by Hotbox and Illstrumentals, mixed, mastered and recorded by Tamas Barany with scratches by DJ Blast. The album included many collaborations like Billy Nova, Sir Pathétik, Kaylah, Lukay, Supa Lexx, Loedie, Sneaky Tone, Slim Sexy, 01Étranjj, L'Queb, Karl Wolf, Goofy Welldone, Stiff, King Ade, Bougat, Marokia and others. Notable singles and music videos included Vice Verset release "Faut qu'on s'evade" featuring Supa Lexx.

The band took part in UNESCO charity event alongside well-known names in France like IAM, LaCliqua, Oxmo Puccino and others and had a track on the compilation album for the event.

== Discography ==
- 2006: Vice City

Tracklist:

1. "Let's Roll" (3:34)
2. "Intro" (1:37)
3. "Pas le choix de reconnaître" (3:47)
4. "Pour mes rêves" (3:21)
5. "Vice Verset Anthem" (Scratches DJ Horg) (3:33)
6. "It's All Right" (featuring Kaylah, Lukay) - Lyrics by Billy Nova & Sir Pathétik (4:50)
7. Skit "Barnev Fillion" - Voice by Goofy Welldone, Slim Sexy (0:32)
8. "Musical Soldiaz" (featuring Supa Lexx) (3:48)
9. "Vice City" (featuring Vice) - Lyrics by Vice (4:05)
10. "M.U.S.I.Q.U.E." (3:55)
11. "M'envie danser" (featuring Loedie) - Lyrics by Loedie (4:55)
12. Skit "R&B Da Vincy" - Voice by Da Vincy (1:59)
13. "Règlements de comptes" (featuring Sneaky Tone) - Lyrics by Sneaky Tone (4:06)
14. Skit "Vice City Match" - Voice by Goofy Welldone, Slim Sexy (0:57)
15. "Redrum" (featuring 01Étranjj, L'Queb) - Lyrics by 01Étranjj, L'Queb (4:48)
16. "On joue chez les pros" (3:41)
17. Skit "Lettre intime d'un auditeur" - Voice by Slim Sexy (1:44)
18. "Lies" - Voice by Marokia - Produced by DJ Blast (3:48)
19. "Faut qu'on s'évade" (featuring Supa Lexx) - Lyrics by Supa Lexx - produced by Karl Wolf (3:53)
20. Skit "Police De Vice City" - Voice by Goofy Welldone, Slim Sexy (1:24)
21. "Gonja" (featuring Stiff and King Ade) - Lyrics by Stiff & King Ade (4:11)
22. "Un monde qui s'achète pas" (featuring Boogat) - Lyrics and production by Boogat (3:49)
23. "Ma Vie" (featuring Marokia) - Lyrics by Marokia (3:37)
24. "Outro" (1:04)

=== Videography ===
- 2006: "Faut qu'on s'évade" (featuring Supa Lexx)

=== Appearances ===
- "Narcotic Snore" - by Cavaliers Noirs, C-Drik, Vice Verset & Uni-T [Apatride Records]
- "Sound Boys" in compilation album L'univers des Lascars
