= Culture (musician) =

Canadian-Bahamian rapper and reggae artist

- Origin: Canada
- Genres: Hip hop, reggae
- Occupation(s): Rapper, singer

Culture is a Canadian-Bahamian hip hop rapper and reggae artist. His biggest chart success has been "Africa" with Karl Wolf. The song was recorded for Karl Wolf's second studio album Bite the Bullet. This version is based on the original 1982 "Africa" song by Toto. The song peaked at number 2 on the March 14, 2009 Canadian Hot 100 chart. It peaked at number 20 on the Japan Hot 100 during the week of Jul 11 2008 and topped MuchMusic Countdown in July 2009.

== Discography ==
=== Singles ===
- "Africa" (Karl Wolf feat. Culture)
