= Africa (Karl Wolf song) =

Single by Karl Wolf featuring Culture

from the album Bite the Bullet
- Released: December 2007
- Recorded: 2007
- Genre: Pop, R&B
- Length: 4:40 (Album Version); 3:56 (Radio Edit with Rap); 3:04 (Radio Edit without Rap)
- Label: LW Records
- Songwriters: Karl Wolf, C. Broadus Jr, David Paich, Jeff Porcaro
- Producer: Karl Wolf

Karl Wolf singles chronology
| "She Wants to Know" (2007) | "Africa" (2007) | "Carrera" (2009) |

Culture singles chronology
| "Africa" (2007) | "Maniac" (2009) |

Music video
- "Africa" on YouTube

Africa is the first official single by Lebanese Canadian singer Karl Wolf from his second studio album Bite the Bullet. The album version of the song features rapper/reggae artist Culture. The song is inspired by the worldwide hit "Africa" by Toto and samples music and covers lyrics from the chorus from the original version, providing new lyrics in place of the original's verses.

== Music video ==
Despite the African title of the song, the music video was actually shot off the shore of Dibba, Oman. The music video for "Africa" starts off with Wolf at his secret island resort on his laptop. He gets a call with the ringtone for "Desensitize" (an earlier hit by Karl Wolf featuring Culture). Culture is on the phone informing Wolf that he is on a boat and heading toward shore to meet up with Wolf.

In the next scene, Wolf sees a conventionally attractive woman in a bikini on the beach and starts talking to her. Some other scenes in the video also take place at nighttime with Wolf, Culture, and another conventionally attractive woman in a yellow bikini around a fireplace.

The music video also reached #1 on the MuchMusic Countdown.

== Chart performance ==
"Africa" debuted at #88 on the Canadian Hot 100 based on airplay alone, then dropped four spots the next week. On the January 24, 2009 issue it skyrocketed from #92 to #45. In early March it was finally released on iTunes for digital downloads, causing it rise up to the top five as it surged up from #32 to #2 on the issue of March 14, 2009 all based on a big number of downloads over the previous week. The song stayed at #2 for four more consecutive weeks on the charts dated between March 14 and April 11, 2009 on the Canadian Hot 100 chart, only outsold by Flo Rida's "Right Round" that stayed at #1 for those five weeks. It also spent three more weeks at #3 in the charts dated between April 18 and May 2, making it a run of 8 weeks in the Top 3. The single has stayed in the chart for a total 37 weeks. In its twenty-sixth week on the Canadian Hot 100, the song re-entered the top ten at #10.

This is Karl Wolf's most successful single to date. The music video of the song peaked at #1 on the MuchMusic Countdown Top 30 charts on 9 July 2009 chart. The song has also found success in Japan, peaking at #20 on the Japan Hot 100 chart.

== Charts ==
=== Weekly charts ===
| Chart (2008–09) | Peak position |
|---|---|
| Canada (Canadian Hot 100) | 2 |
| Czech Republic Airplay (ČNS IFPI) | 3 |
| Hungary (Rádiós Top 40) | 4 |
| Japan (Japan Hot 100) | 20 |
| Slovakia Airplay (ČNS IFPI) | 31 |

=== Year-end charts ===
| Chart (2009) | Position |
|---|---|
| Canadian Hot 100 | 9 |

== Other versions ==
Karl Wolf includes three versions of the song on Bite the Bullet:

- The official single
- A club version of Africa
- A video release version of Africa

The 2009 version also appears as a bonus track on his 2009 album Nightlife.

In 2010, Karl Wolf also released a video version during the 2010 FIFA World Cup entitled "Africa (World Cup Edition)". The video produced by Lone Wolf and moCore and shot in Montreal shows Karl Wolf and a group of young soccer players. Very notably also, this remake doesn't include any vocals by Culture.

There is a dance remix of the song by MC Joe and The Vanillas which peaked at #38 on the Canadian Hot 100 based on digital sales.

The song played in the background of a video footage from a May 12 season 8 episode of American Idol showing Carrie Underwood in Africa.

A radio edit labeled "Top 40 No Rap Radio Edit" was released by Promo Only in the U.S.

Karl Wolf has also made a 2008 remake of his version of "Africa" retitled as "The Song For Peace" and completely new lyrics and dedicated to Lebanon, but sampling very largely on his earlier "Africa" hit. This Lebanon version although not found on his albums nor released as a single, remains very popular with the Lebanese public.

On 26 October 2013, the Hungarian vocal band ByTheWay performed a version of the song during season 4 of the Hungarian X-Faktor in the third live show of the programme themed as "Autumn Legends". ByTheWay mentored by Róbert Szikora moved to the next round and eventually was runner up for season.

== Release history ==
| Region | Date | Format |
|---|---|---|
| Canada | December 2008 | Radio (Airplay) |
| Canada | 14 March 2009 | Digital Download |
| United States | February 2010 | CD single, Digital download |

== Awards and nominations ==
| Year | Award | Category | Nominated Work | Result |
|---|---|---|---|---|
| 2009 | MuchMusic Video Awards | Pop Video of the Year | "Africa" | Nominated |
| 2010 | Sounds of Blackness Awards | Anglophone Song of the Year | "Africa" | Won |
| 2010 | Canadian Radio Music Awards | Best New Group or Solo Mainstream A/C Artist of the Year | Himself (for "Africa") | Nominated |
| 2010 | Canadian Radio Music Awards | Best New Group or Solo Hot A/C Artist of the Year | Himself (for "Africa") | Won |

== See also ==
- Africa (song)
- Fight for You by Jason Derülo
