= Abdul Majeed Abdullah =

Saudi singer

Abdul Majeed Abdullah عبد المجيد عبد الله
- Abdullah in 2006

Background information
- Born: 3 August 1962 (age 64); Jizan, Saudi Arabia
- Genres: Arabic pop; Khaliji
- Occupations: Singer; composer; actor
- Instrument: Vocals
- Years active: 1984–present
- Labels: EMI; Rotana Records

Abdul Majeed Abdullah (Arabic: عبد المجيد عبد الله; born 3 August 1962) is a Saudi singer, composer, and actor. He is one of the most well-known performers of popular music in Middle East.

== Biography ==
Abdul Majeed Abdullah started his musical career after being discovered by his mentor Ibrahim Sultan, who accompanied a young Abdul Majeed to Jeddah where he started singing on a local radio station. Since then he has released many albums and singles to this day. He regularly performs at many local and international music festivals. In 2019, he was honored with a star on Dubai Walk of Fame. In 2020, he, along with 12 other Saudi artistes, was featured in a national song titled "Salam from Saudi Arabia", which was a major collaborative effort with Rotana Audio Visual, Saudi Arabia's General Entertainment Authority (GEA).

Abdul Majeed Abdullah has three children namely Abdullah, Muhammed, & Manar. In 2020, his son Mohamed Abdul Majeed Abdullah launched his career with the release of his first single "Ya Bakhty Fek".

== Discography ==
=== Albums ===
- Rayeg (2000)
- Yataib el Galb (2000)
- The Best of Jalsahs (2000)
- Inta al Aziz (2000)
- Best Of (2001)
- Raheeb (2001)
- Rouhi Tehibbak (2001)
- Ostaz Ishq (2001)
- Abdul Majeed Abdullah (2004)
- Layalina (2004)
- Ghali (2004)
- El Hob el Jedeed (2005
- Ensan Aktar (2006)
- A'azz el Naz (2006)
- Al Hob al Jadid (2006)
- Haflet Jedda 2007 (2007)
- Melyon Khater (2008)
- Aalam Mowazi (2021)
- Abdul Majeed Abdullah 2026 (2026)

=== Singles & EPs ===
- Live 2004
- Tanakud
- Hala Bish
- Abdul Majeed Abdullah 2024

=== Charted songs ===
Title	Year	Peak chart positions		Album or EP
Title	Year	KSA	MENA	Album or EP
"Ash Salman" (with Rashed Al-Majed)	2015	3	7	Non-album single
"Yabn Elawadem"	2021	12	6	Aaalam Mowazi
"Tetnafasek Denyaay"	2022	*	18	Non-album singles
"Mekanek"	2023	*	11	Non-album singles
"Lak Saqeni Al Rab"	2024	9	—	Non-album singles
"Haka Wajed"	2024	5	17	Abdul Majeed Abdullah 2024
"Ya Monyati"	2024	11	—	Abdul Majeed Abdullah 2024
"Aba Eash"	2024	12	—	Abdul Majeed Abdullah 2024
"Ahot Rasi"	2024	6	—	Abdul Majeed Abdullah 2024
"Ahtajelak"	2024	7	—	Abdul Majeed Abdullah 2024
"Khalas Mabi"	2024	18	—	Abdul Majeed Abdullah 2024
"Ya Roh Aldar"	2025	12	—	Non-album singles
"Ghairek Sowaak"	2025	7	—	Non-album singles
"Khatamt Al Amani"	2025	20	—	Non-album singles
"Awedt Qalby"	2026	8	15	Abdul Majeed Abdullah 2026
"Ana Yendm Alaye"	2026	7	17	Abdul Majeed Abdullah 2026
"Qedr Yensa"	2026	13	—	Abdul Majeed Abdullah 2026
"Heibah"	2026	20	—	Abdul Majeed Abdullah 2026
"Bezmtk"	2026	19	—	Abdul Majeed Abdullah 2026
"—" denotes a recording that did not chart or was not released in that territory. "*" denotes that the chart did not exist at that time.
