= Striger =

Canadian hip hop and reggae singer

Striger Laurent, better known by his mononym Striger (born in Montreal, Quebec) is a Canadian hip hop and reggae world fusion singer of Haitian origin. He was also part of the Canadian bilingual French/English hip hop duo Vice Verset. He is also known with his long-term collaboration with Canadian singer Karl Wolf.

== Career ==
=== Beginnings ===
Striger started in music very early and by 12 had his first show. He was later signed to Les disques KLM and in 1997 formed the music collective IMPAACT that included amongst others Kulcha Connection and JD.

=== Vice Verset ===
Also in 1997 he formed the Quebec hip hop band duo Vice Verset with David Dubé (also known as Da Vincy). The band took part in many competitions and appeared in Rap City '97 finishing third overall, but also named best French rap group for the year. They took part in events like Rockon 1998 dance competition and in Les FrancoFolies de Montréal in 2005. The duo released the album Vice City in 2006 on HLM Records with many collaborations that included Billy Nova, Sir Pathétik, Kaylah, Lukay, Supa Lexx, Loedie, Sneaky Tone, Slim Sexy, 01Étranjj, L'Queb, Karl Wolf, Goofy Welldone, Stiff, King Ade, Bougat, Marokia and others. They also took part in UNESCO charity event alongside well-known names in France like IAM, LaCliqua, Oxmo Puccino and others and had a track on the compilation album for the event.

=== Collaborations ===
Besides his own and Vice Verset materials, Striger started collaborating with well-known artists. He was featured in Caroline Néron's massive number 1 hit and music video "Colle-toi à moi" that also appeared in Néron's album Reprogrammée. Also notably, he appeared the same year in Lebanese-Canadian Karl Wolf's debut album Face Behind the Face being featured in one of Karl Wolf's earliest hits called "Hollow Girl". In 2008, he was featured alongside Othello in Chub-e Pelletier's hit "Burnout" and in Dialekt's "Calmly Rushed" alongside Carleone Brown and Vcx.

Striger, specially after "Hollow Girl" has been an integral part of many of Karl Wolf's live shows throughout Canada and internationally and is featured, alongside other collaborating artists in the Karl Wolf reality television show WolfPack to be broadcast in 2014.

=== Production ===
Starting 2009, Striger started music production with several artists like Rime, Manny, Anthony Roussel and many others working from NOS Studios. He is also active in live shows, and festivals and appeared on CitiTV New Year's Eve celebrations in 2012 in Toronto.

He is also a partner and artist in Blast Productions, part of an international group, providing music shows and entertainment in North America, Asia and the Middle East.

He is working on a solo reggae and hip hop album.

== Discography ==
=== Albums ===
as part of Vice Verset

- 2006: Vice City [HLM Records]

Solo

- 2013: TBA

=== Singles and appearances ===
- 2006: "Colle-toi à moi" (Caroline Néron feat. Striger)
- 2006: "Hollow Girl" (Karl Wolf feat. Striger)
