= Sandy (Egyptian singer) =

Egyptian singer (born 1986)

Sandy ساندي
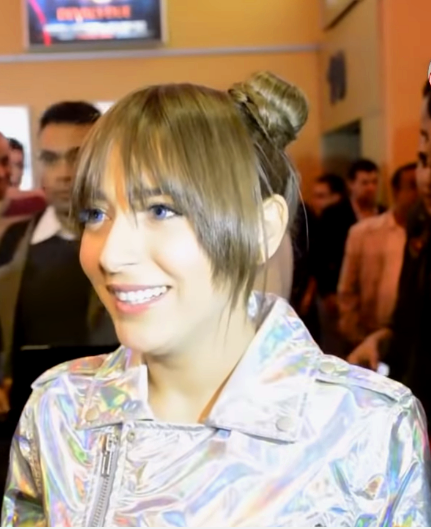

Background information
- Born: Sandy Adel Ahmed Hussein; 22 April 1986 (age 40); Cairo, Egypt
- Origin: Egyptian
- Genres: Arabic Pop; Pop
- Occupation: Singer • actress
- Instruments: Vocals
- Years active: 2006–present
- Labels: Melody (2006–2016); Pause Records (2017–2024); Rotana (2024-present)

Sandy Adel Ahmed Hussein (Arabic: ساندي عادل أحمد حسين; born 22 April 1986), known mononymously as Sandy, is an Egyptian singer and actress. She released five studio albums and three extended play (EP). She made her acting debut in the 2014 film Jimmy's Plan, and later starred in Live Your Life (2019) and Tag (2023).

== Career ==
In 2006, Sandy signed with Mega Star and released her debut studio album, Kol Ma Arrab. She later stated that she wasn't fully accepting of that particular album because the songs were "too old" in which she described as "not interesting". Her second studio album, Lessa Soughayarah, was released in 2009 through Melody and Solo Records, and it featured three singles. In 2011, she released her debut extended play (EP), Up to the Challenge, also called Ad Eltahadi. Sandy described the project as a "mini-album" which features three songs. The music video for the song "Hasal Kheir" was directed by American director David Zennie. She described the song as her breakthrough song. In 2012, Sandy collaborated with Canadian singer Karl Wolf on "Awel Marra Atgaraa", as the lead single from her third album. Her third studio album, Ahsan Min Keteer was released in August 2012, through EMI. The same year, she was nominated for the "Best Middle East Act" award at the MTV Europe Music Awards.

In early 2013, it was announced that Sandy would be making her acting debut in the comedy-fantasy film Jimmy's Plan. The film would later be released in January 2014. On 24 July 2014, Sandy released her fourth studio album Helwa Gedan. In 2016, Sandy's fifth studio album, Love, was released. The same year, she starred in her own kids show called Candy Sandy.

== Fake retirement announcement ==
On 30 December 2015, it was announced through Sandy's Facebook account that singer would officially retire. The statement revealed that she would retire due to her illness and that she's asking for forgiveness from God. Following the announcement, Sandy's name was trending on Twitter, with her decision being met with mixed reactions. Later, people speculated that the announcement was fake, since the singer has already announced that she finished making her sixth album. Her sister revealed that Sandy went to Germany due to suffering from inflammation in her vocal cords, and her lawyer confirmed her sister's statement by also revealing that that's the reason why she won't perform at a new year's day concert, while her manager said that she received a financial payment for the concert and she will perform.

Previously in an interview, Sandy revealed that she was thinking of retiring due to the amount of stress and pressure. In February 2016, a new statement was posted into her official Instagram account revealing that Sandy doesn't manage her Facebook account and that she had no idea about the previous announcement. Sandy later revealed that she was secretly married to her manager for eight years, and when she asked for divorce he declined and announced her retirement while she was in Germany.

== Discography ==
=== Studio albums ===
- Kol Ma Arrab (2006)
- Lessa Soughayarah (2009)
- Ahsan Min Keteer (2012)
- Helwa Gedan (2014)
- Love (2016)

=== Compilation albums ===
- Etnen Fi Wahda (2020)

=== Extended plays ===
- Up to the Challenge (2011)
- Shokran Ala Embareh (2025)
- Skoot (2026)

== Awards and nominations ==
Year	Organization	Award	Nominated work	Result	Ref.
2012	MTV Europe Music Awards	Best Middle East Act	Herself	Nominated	
2013	MEMA Awards	Best Duet	"Awel Mara Atgara"	Won	

== Music videos ==
Hussein's songs
Title	Title in English	Director	Produced by	From album
كل ما أقرب	"Everything closer"	Tamer Bassiouni		
شوفته وماكلمنيش	"Hovth and Makelmenah"	Younis		
هموت عليك	"Hmut you"	Younis		
هموت عليك – ريمكس	"Hmut you – remix"	Younis		Little Lessa
خربت مالطا	"Remembering Malta"	Younis		Little Lessa
إياك	"Warning"	Yasser Al-Najjar		Little Lessa
ابن جارتنا	"Son of our neighbor"	Taha Tunisia		Little Lessa
حصل خير	"It got better"	David Zennie		You can dispute
الحلم	"Dream"	Eric Carlson		
ماتحملت الزعل	"Mathmmelt Azaal"	Rotana		Fabiaewman
عايزة اقولك	"Ayza Acolk"	David Zennie	The Voice of the Delta	
أحسن من كتير	"Better Kteer"	David Zennie	The Voice of the Delta	
محبطة	"Frustrating"	The Delta Sound		
ساندي – عمري مايئست	"Sandy – Never Give Up"			

== Personal life ==
She was married to composer Husam Badran from 2009 to 2017. Shortly after, she married director Hazem Kattana. They separated in 2018.
