= Karl Wolf =

Canadian musician (born 1979)

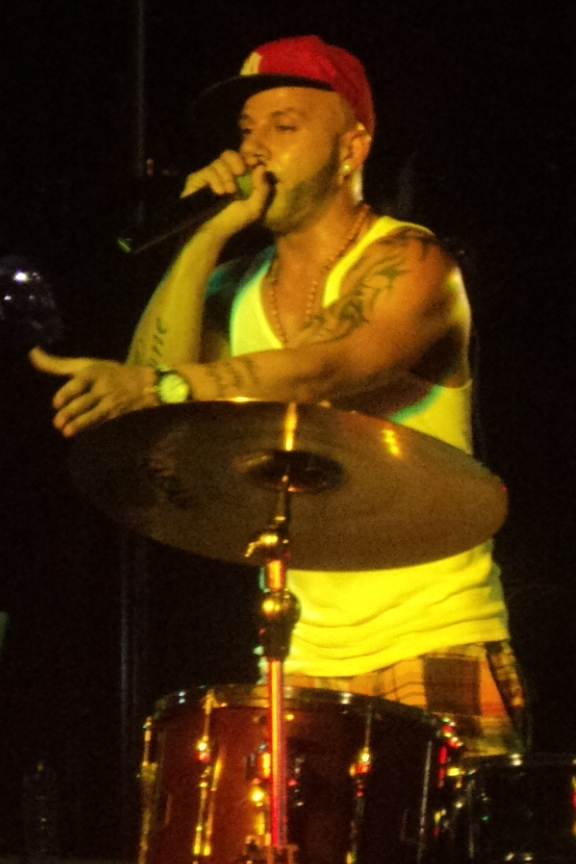
- Karl Wolf performing in Montreal in June 2011

Background information
- Also known as: KW, Karl Wolf
- Born: Carl Abou Samah; April 18, 1979 (age 47); Beirut, Lebanon
- Origin: Toronto, Ontario, Canada
- Genres: Pop, R&B, soul, fusion
- Occupations: Singer, songwriter, record producer, musician
- Instruments: Vocals, guitar, piano
- Years active: 2001–present
- Labels: LW Records; LW Entertainment; EMI (2001–2010); Universal Republic (2010); Universal Music Canada (2011–present)
- Formerly of: Sky
- Website: www.karlwolf.com

Carl Abou Samah (Arabic: كارل أبو سمح; born April 18, 1979), better known by his stage name Karl Wolf, is a Lebanese-Canadian musician based in Toronto, Ontario, Canada.

Karl Wolf has been a singer, songwriter, and producer since 2001, releasing his first solo album Face Behind the Face on MapleNationwide/Universal in 2006, followed by a second album Bite the Bullet in 2007. His third album Nightlife was released in 2009 followed by Finally Free in 2012, Stereotype in 2014 and WOW in 2015. His biggest hit has been a remake of Toto's "Africa" sampling from the song and providing new lyrics and arrangements.

Through his company, Lone Wolf Management, Wolf also manages a number of new artists. In 2015, he announced a new collaboration under the name BAE (Be All Equal) with Show Stephens, Brenda Mullen and producer MasterTrak. Wolf signed a new solo contract in Canada with British Columbia-based Cordova Bay Records as well as two new worldwide deals in Los Angeles, one for a publishing contract with BMG and another Digital "YouTube" deal with Collective Digital Studios. He co-wrote the OMI hit "Hula Hoop".

== Early years ==
Wolf was born as Carl Abou Samah in Beirut, Lebanon. He came from a musical household. His mother was a piano instructor and his father played the oud, derbake and guitar. He moved on with his family to Sharjah, UAE when he was three years old due to the civil war in Lebanon. He studied in the UAE. In an interview with Shave Magazine, Karl explained that in Arabic, his family name (Abou Samah) means 'father of forgiveness'. His stage name 'wolf' comes from a nickname he received on his high school basketball team because he was the smallest and quickest in his team.

At 16, Wolf immigrated to Canada in 1995, residing in Montreal, Quebec. He studied Film Studies at Montreal's Concordia University. He began his career "behind the scenes," and has been writing and co-producing since 2001. Initially he was a backup singer for some hits by the Quebec band Dubmatique. The 2001 hit album from Gabrielle Destroismaisons generated two singles co-written by him that reached No. 1 on the BDS Francophone Charts, and the record earned him a Félix Award at the L'ADISQ Awards for "Best Mix and Sound of the Year".

Wolf's work with Gabrielle brought him to the attention of Antoine Sicotte, of the top-selling Canadian pop band Sky, where he was recruited as a singer-songwriter becoming Sky's new lead singer in 2002. Wolf co-wrote and co-produced the third Sky album, Picture Perfect (on Sextant/EMI), with strong airplay across Canada. Sicotte and Wolf cooperated on the hugely successful Star Académie reality TV show in Quebec. The subsequent album was the biggest-selling album in Canada in 2003, notching a phenomenal sales in Canadian terms and earning Karl Wolf a SOCAN Award for Most Popular Song. A Star Académie II sequel in 2004 was another big success, the album going double-platinum.

== Solo years (since 2005) ==
In 2005, Wolf ventured into a solo career. He released his debut solo album Face Behind the Face in January 2006. Since its release, the album broke in the Canadian Top 100 sales chart and spawned three singles, "Butterflies" and "Desensitize".

Wolf followed with a second studio album Bite the Bullet in November 2007. The first single release from the album was "Africa", a remake of the worldwide hit "Africa" by Toto. The Karl Wolf remake features Canadian artist Culture. In early March 2009, with the release of the single on iTunes for digital downloads, it surged up from No. 32 to No. 2 on the issue of March 14, 2009 based on huge numbers of downloads over the previous week. It peaked at No. 1 on the iTunes charts and It also stayed at No. 2 for four further week on the chart of March 21 and 28 and April 4 and 11, 2009. Prior to iTunes download, it had topped at No. 20 in the same chart. This is so far Karl Wolf's most successful single to date. The song also topped the MuchMusic Top 30 Countdown charts and has also found success in Japan, peaking at No. 20 on the Japan Hot 100 chart. His follow-up single this year titled "Carrera" climbed to peak at No. 39 on the Billboard Canadian Hot 100.

Nightlife, his third album, was released on November 17, 2009.

After nine years with EMI Music, in March 2010 he signed a new recording contract in the United States with Universal Republic followed by a worldwide deal with Universal Music Canada in 2011. EMI Japan and EMI Middle East, who still had the exclusive license to Karl Wolf's upcoming album, released his fourth album Finally Free on July 10, 2012. Through his company, Lone Wolf Management, Karl Wolf also manages a number of new artists.

In September 2014, he released the album Stereotype followed in 2015 with the album WOW.

In April 2021, he released his tenth album 2AM Vibes with a number of collaborations.

== Lone Wolf Management / LW Entertainment / LW Records ==
In addition to his solo career, Wolf has established "LW Entertainment" and his own record label "LW Records" and recording studio (with LW standing for Lone Wolf).

Through his company, Lone Wolf Management, Karl Wolf also manages a number of new artists with his long time manager Pascal Malkoun.

Karl Wolf has also produced for Quebec singers Mitsou, Emily, Jérôme-Philippe (aka Disoul) also becoming for a time, part of the latter's band Dubmatique.

== BAE (Be All Equal) ==
In 2015, Karl Wolf announced a collaboration under the name BAE (Be All Equal) that includes Karl Wolf and hip-hop artist Show Stephens and singer-songwriter Brenda Mullen. Co-produced by Wolf and DJ producer MasterTrak, the act is signed to Armin Van Buuren's Armada Music label. The formation's first single is "I'm Lonely". Karl Wolf and BAE were included as one of the opening acts for renowned singer Akon's 2015 Canada-wide tour which also included acts like Peter Jackson and Afrocen3.

== Collaborations ==
Karl Wolf has collaborated with a number of artists, mainly from Canada. Choclair was featured in one of his earliest hits titled "Desensitize" and Canadian rapper Culture is featured in his biggest hit "Africa", whereas Rime and Kaz Money are featured in "Yalla Habibi". Sway was featured in "Hurting" and Kardinal Offishall was featured in "Ghetto Love". His single "Fuck Shit Up / Mash It Up" produced by Greg Stainer & Dany Neville featured Three 6 Mafia, Timbaland and B K Brasco in "Magic Hotel" and Fatman Scoop in "Let's Get Rowdy".

Also in 2015, Karl Wolf co-wrote with Omar Pasley (OMI), Jenson Vaughan and Matthew Humphrey OMI's international single "Hula Hoop", a follow-up to OMI's hit "Cheerleader".

Making a comeback in 2020, Karl Wolf collaborated with up and coming artist Raeshaun and was featured on the track "Dubai" in July, paying homage to the city and country that took him and his family in during the Civil War in Lebanon.

== In popular culture ==
- Karl Wolf was a featured artist on the Arabic version of Star Academy broadcast on Lebanese Broadcasting Corporation (LBC). In the fifth season of the show, he was seen mentoring the contestants. Some joined him for renditions of his hits, including "Butterfly" and "Africa"
- In 2011, he organized a Close Up Arabia campaign for recruiting participants in a music video project of his. and the resulting music video.
- Karl Wolf has also collaborated and performed in concerts with Akon, Ne-Yo, T-Pain and many more artists and as a special guest also. He co-wrote with Jenson Vaughan, Frank Bülles, Matthew Humphrey and Omar Pasley (OMI) the latter's international hit "Hula Hoop".

== Discography ==
=== Studio albums ===
Title	Album details	Peak chart positions	
Title	Album details	CAN	JPN
Face Behind the Face	Released: December 2004; Label: Lone Wolf; Formats: CD, digital download	—	—
Bite the Bullet	Released: July 11, 2007; Label: Lone Wolf, EMI; Formats: CD, digital download	100	—
Karl Wolf	Released: June 25, 2008 (JPN); Label: Lone Wolf, EMI; Formats: CD, digital download	—	23
Nightlife	Released: November 17, 2009; Label: Lone Wolf, EMI; Formats: CD, digital download	—	29
Ghetto Love	Released: August 24, 2011 (JPN); Label: Lone Wolf, EMI; Formats: CD, digital download	—	54
Finally Free	Released: July 10, 2012; Label: Lone Wolf, Universal; Formats: CD, digital download	—	—
Stereotype	Released: September 2, 2014; Label: Lone Wolf, Universal; Formats: CD, digital download	—	—
WOW	Released: March 17, 2015; Label: Lone Wolf, EMI; Formats: CD, digital download	—	—
Blacklight (The Export, Vol. 2)	Released: September 7, 2018; Label: Lone Wolf; Formats: digital download	—	—
2AM Vibes	Released: April 16, 2021; Label: Lone Wolf; Formats: digital download	—	—

=== Compilation albums ===
Title	Album details	Peak chart positions	
Title	Album details	CAN	JPN
The Best of Karl Wolf	Released: October 20, 2017; Label: Lone Wolf, Universal; Formats: CD, digital download	—	—

=== Extended plays ===
Title	Album details
The Export Vol. 1	Released: June 17, 2016; Label: Lone Wolf, Cordova Bay; Formats: CD, digital download

=== Singles ===
Year	Single	Chart positions		Certifications	Album
Year	Single	CAN	JPN	Certifications	Album
2005	"Butterflies"	—	—		Face Behind the Face
2006	"Desensitize" (feat. Choclair)	—	—		Face Behind the Face
2006	"Referee"	—	—		Face Behind the Face
2007	"She Wants to Know"	—	—		Bite the Bullet
2008	"Africa" (feat. Culture)	2	20	MC: 4× Platinum	Bite the Bullet
2009	"Carrera"	39	—	MC: Gold	Bite the Bullet
2009	"Yalla Habibi" (feat. Rime Salmi & Kaz Money)	24	51	MC: Gold	Nightlife
2010	"Hurting" (feat. Sway)	55	—		Nightlife
2010	"80's Baby"	—	—		Nightlife
2011	"Ghetto Love" (feat. Kardinal Offishall)	20	—	MC: Gold	Finally Free
2011	"Mash It Up" / "Fuck Shit Up" (feat. Three 6 Mafia)	28	—	MC: Gold	Finally Free
2012	"DJ Gonna Save Us" (feat. Mr. OxXx)	58	—		Finally Free
2013	"Peace Out" (feat. P Reign)	—	—		Finally Free
2013	"Go Your Own Way"	—	—		Stereotype
2014	"Magic Hotel" (feat. Timbaland & BK Brasco)	75	—		Stereotype
2014	"Summertime" / "Let's Get Rowdy (feat. Fatman Scoop)	48	—		Stereotype
2015	"Not Over Me Yet" (feat. MasterTrak)	46	—		WOW
2015	"Toronto Love"	—	—		WOW
2016	"Amateur at Love"	100	—	MC: Gold	The Export Vol. 1
2017	"Wherever You Go"	—	—		The Best of
2019	"Yes" (feat. Super Sako, Deena, Fito Blanko)	—	—		Non-album single
2020	"City of Lies" (feat. Julius Wilson)	—	—		2AM Vibes
2020	"Get Away"	—	—		2AM Vibes
2021	"Not Too Late"	—	—		2AM Vibes
2021	"Ya Hilwe (Dance with Me Now)" (with Sandy)	—	—		Non-album single

Others

- 2007: "Hollow Girl" (feat. Striger)
- 2007: "Butterflies" (with Eve)
- 2008: "Like This" (feat. Sandman)
- 2009: "Maniac Maniac" (feat. Culture)
- 2009: "You Forgot About Me" (feat. Imposs)
- 2009: "No Way Nobody" (feat. Loon)
- 2011: "Tell Me" (feat. Nirvana Savoury)
- 2013: "Go Your Own Way" (feat. Reema Major)

=== Featured artist ===
Date	Song title	Performing credits	Peak Chart Position CAN	Peak Chart Position SWI	Album title
2006	"Get Down / Respire"	VJ Malik Shaheed feat. Karl Wolf	–	–	Franglais by Malik Shaheed
2006	"Weekend"	Choclair feat. Karl Wolf	–	–	Flagship by Choclair
2006	"Makes Me Wonder"	Chopovski feat. Karl Wolf	–	–	Bite the Bullet by Chopovski
2008	"Crazy Girl"	Taio Cruz feat. Karl Wolf	–	–	
2010	"Si jeune"	Jacob Guay feat. Karl Wolf	–	–	Si Jeune by Jacob Guay
2011	"Enta Ma'ai"	Diana Haddad feat. Karl Wolf	–	–	Bent Osol by Diana Haddad
2011	"Yalla Asia"	Jay Sean and Karl Wolf featuring Radhika Vekaria	–	–	non-album single
2011	"Everything Is All Wrong"	Marc Mysterio feat. Karl Wolf and Jamie Sparks	–	–	non-album single
2012	"Awel Mara Atgara"	Sandy feat. Karl Wolf	–	–	
2012	"Turn It Up"	Kardinal Offishall feat. Karl Wolf	32	–	
2012	"Frente A Frente"	DJ Ricky Campanelli feat. Karl Wolf	–	–	Modestia Aparte
2013	"Unbreakable"	DJ Antoine feat. Karl Wolf	–	–	Sky Is The Limit by DJ Antoine
2013	"Fire"	David Obeji feat. Karl Wolf	–	–	
2013	"Stick Up"	Shawn Desman feat. Karl Wolf	–	–	–
2014	"Incredible"	Jaden Chase feat. Karl Wolf	–	–	
2015	"Beat Again"	Project 46 feat. Karl Wolf	–	–	Beautiful by Project 46
2018	"Ole Ole"	DJ Antoine feat. Karl Wolf & Fito Blanko	–	60	
2020	"Dubai"	Raeshaun feat. Karl Wolf	–	–	
2023	"Firealarm"	Dani Doucette feat. Karl Wolf	–	–	

== Awards and nominations ==
Awards and nominations for Karl Wolf
Year	Award	Category	Nominated Work	Result
2001	ADISQ (Felix Award)	Best Mix and Sound of the Year	"Gabrielle Destroismaisons"	Won
2004	SOCAN	Best popular song	"Je vais changer le monde" (Star Académie) in Quebec	Won
2007	Juno Awards	R&B/Soul Recording of the Year	Face Behind the Face	Nominated
2008	MTV Europe Music Awards	Best Arabia Act	Himself	Won
2009	MuchMusic Video Awards	Favourite New Artist/Group	Himself	Nominated
2009	MuchMusic Video Awards	Pop Video of the Year	"Africa"	Nominated
2010	Sounds of Blackness Awards	Best Anglophone R&B Artist or Group of the Year	Himself	Won
2010	Sounds of Blackness Awards	Anglophone Single of the Year	"Africa"	Won
2010	Canadian Radio Music Awards	Fan's Choice Award	Himself	Nominated
2010	Canadian Radio Music Awards	Best New Group or Solo Mainstream A/C Artist of the Year	Himself (for "Africa")	Nominated
2010	Canadian Radio Music Awards	Best New Group or Solo Hot A/C Artist of the Year	Himself (for "Africa")	Won
2010	SOCAN	Urban Music Award	"Africa"	Won
2010	SOCAN	Anglophone Song of the Year	"Africa"	Won
2011	Juno Awards	R&B/Soul Recording of the Year	Nightlife	Nominated
2012	Juno Awards	R&B/Soul Recording of the Year	"Ghetto Love"	Nominated
2012	SOCAN	Anglophone Song of the Year	"Hurting"	Won
2013	Canadian Urban Music Awards	Urban Artist of The Year	Himself	Won
2013	SOCAN	Anglophone Song of the Year	"Mash It Up"	Won
2017	CUT Hip Hop Awards	R&B Album of the Year	"The Export Vol 1"	Won
2019	SOCAN	POP MUSIC AWARD (songwriter)	"Not A Love Song" by Bulow	Won
2022	Juno Awards	Dance Recording of the Year	"Get Away (Radio Edit)"	Nominated
