= X-Faktor series 4 =

X-Faktor
- Series 4
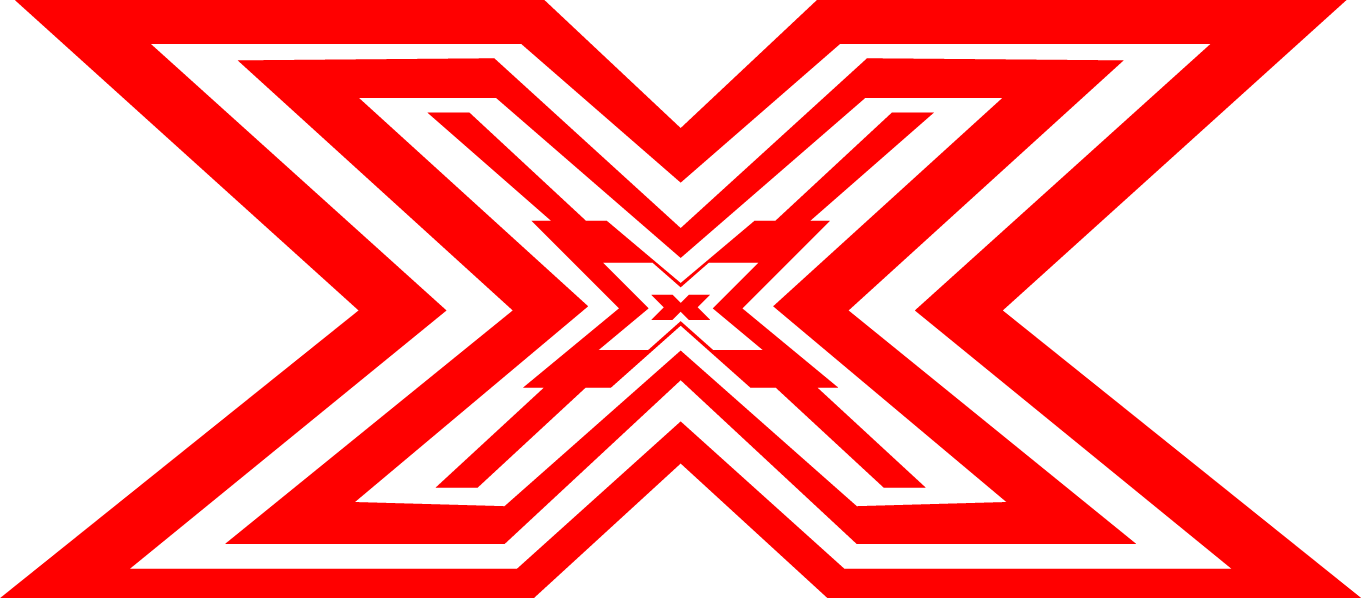
- X-Faktor
- Hosted by: Lilu; Bence Istenes
- Judges: Péter Geszti; Róbert Szikora; Gabi Tóth; Róbert Alföldi
- Winner: Dóra Danics
- Winning mentor: Péter Geszti
- Runner-up: ByTheWay

Release
- Original network: RTL Klub
- Original release: 7 September – 15 December 2013

Series chronology
- ← Previous; Series 3 Next → Series 5

This is the fourth season of Hungarian version of The X Factor. The fourth season premiered on 7 September 2013 on the commercial channel RTL Klub. The show was hosted by Lilu and Bence Istenes. The original host Nóra Ördög left the show due to her pregnancy. The line up also changed this year. The only original judge, who returned for season 4 was Péter Geszti. Joined him on the panel Róbert Szikora, Gabi Tóth and Róbert Alföldi.

On 16 December 2012 the show's host Nóra Ördög announced, that the show would be back for its 4th season in 2013. The apply for the auditions started on the same day.

== Judges and hosts ==
On 29 April the new judges were announced as returning judge Péter Geszti and new judges Róbert Szikora, Gabi Tóth and Róbert Alföldi. Miklós Malek confirmed his exit on 16 December 2012. Later Ildikó Keresztes also confirmed, that she will not return to the show for another season. In April Feró Nagy also announced his exit.

On 17 May 2013 RTL Klub confirmed that the new hosts were Lilu and Bence Istenes. The previous host, Nóra Ördög left the show due to her pregnancy.

== Auditions ==
Auditions began on 25 May 2013. The contestants came in their thousands.

== Bootcamp ==
The Bootcamp was aired on 28 and 29 September.

The contestants sang live for an audience and the judges. The hopefuls chose a song, what they wanted to sing. At the end of the day, the judges revealed the 25 remaining acts for the Judges' Homes. The boys category had an extra, 7th acts. And the judges found out, which category they would be mentoring.

== Judges' houses ==
At this stage of the competition each judge mentored six acts. 25 acts (7 in the boys category) went through for this stage of the show. Each judge had help from a guest judge to choose their final acts.

The thirteen eliminated acts were:

- Boys: Manó Ráduly Botond, David Horvath, Kristóf Karapándzsity, Richárd Nagy
- Girls: Melina Molnár, Nóra Nagy, Eszter Olajos
- Over 25s: Zoltán Bátky, Lia Komondi, Nelli Nagyváradi
- Groups: SPEAK UP!, Sunset Strip, Wild Rhythm Smokers

== Contestants ==
Twelve acts go through to this stage of the show.

Key:

– Winner
– Runner-up
– Third Place
– Withdrew

Category (mentor)	Acts		
Boys (Tóth)	Ákos Csordás	Ádám Szabó	Marcell Tóth
Girls (Alföldi)	Lili Batánovics	Anikó Eckert	Lili Péterffy
Over 25s (Geszti)	Márk Bozsek	Dóra Danics	Tünde Krasznai
Groups (Szikora)	ByTheWay	Fat Phoenix	MDC

== Results summary ==
– mentored by Róbert Alföldi (Girls)	– Bottom two
– mentored by Gabi Tóth (Boys)	– Most public votes that week
– mentored by Róbert Szikora (Groups)	– Withdrew
– mentored by Péter Geszti (Over 25s)

	Week 1	Week 2	Week 3	Week 4	Week 5	Week 6	Week 7	Week 8	Week 9	Final Week 10	
	Week 1	Week 2	Week 3	Week 4	Week 5	Week 6	Week 7	Week 8	Week 9	Round 1	Round 2
Dóra Danics	1st 15.77%	1st 12.69%	1st 17.47%	2nd 14.44%	2nd 14.49%	3rd 17.04%	3rd 16.15%	2nd 20.70%	2nd 29.96%	2nd 33.44%	Winner; 56.34%
ByTheWay	6th 7.83%	5th 10.11%	5th 9.12%	9th 8.45%	1st 37.24%	1st 21.27%	1st 24.58%	1st 28.90%	1st 33.30%	1st 34.32%	Runner-Up; 43.66%
Tünde Krasznai	4th 9.17%	3rd 10.91%	6th 9.06%	6th 9.30%	4th 8.99%	6th 11.19%	2nd 22.02%	3rd 20.60%	3rd 20.47%	3rd 32.34%	Eliminated (Week 10)
Ákos Csordás	3rd 11.69%	7th 9.05%	8th 8.15%	8th 8.85%	3rd 11.82%	5th 12.04%	4th 14.53%	5th 10.68%	4th 16.27%	Eliminated (Week 9)	
Ádám Szabó	5th 8.57%	6th 10.06%	4th 10.81%	7th 9.19%	7th 6.71%	2nd 18.62%	5th 11.96%	4th 19.12%	Eliminated (Week 8)		
Lili Péterffy	10th 4.92%	10th 5.43%	7th 8.19%	5th 10.90%	6th 7.78%	4th 12.27%	6th 10.76%	Eliminated (Week 7)			
Fat Phoenix	8th 6.46%	2nd 11.73%	2nd 12.16%	3rd 12.91%	5th 8.18%	7th 7.56%	Eliminated (Week 6)				
Lili Batánovics	7th 7.49%	8th 7.35%	9th 7.25%	4th 11.26%	8th 6.36%	Eliminated (Week 5)					
Márk Bozsek	2nd 12.68%	4th 10.35%	3rd 10.83%	1st 14.82%	Withdrew (Week 5)						
Anikó Eckert	12th 4.35%	9th 7.03%	10th 6.98%	Eliminated (Week 3)							
Marcell Tóth	9th 6.21%	11th 5.28%	Eliminated (Week 2)								
MDC	11th 4.88%	Eliminated (Week 1)									
Bottom Two	MDC, Anikó Eckert	Marcell Tóth, Lili Péterffy	Anikó Eckert, Lili Batánovics	ByTheWay, Ákos Csordás	Lili Batánovics, Ádám Szabó	Fat Phoenix, Tünde Krasznai	Lili Péterffy, Ádám Szabó	Ádám Szabó, Ákos Csordás	Ákos Csordás, Tünde Krasznai	No judges' vote or final showdown: public votes alone decide who is eliminated and who ultimately wins	
Geszti's vote to eliminate	MDC	Lili Péterffy	Anikó Eckert	Ákos Csordás	Lili Batánovics	Fat Phoenix	Lili Péterffy	Ádám Szabó	Ákos Csordás	No judges' vote or final showdown: public votes alone decide who is eliminated and who ultimately wins	
Szikora's vote to eliminate	Anikó Eckert	Marcell Tóth	Anikó Eckert	Ákos Csordás	Lili Batánovics	Tünde Krasznai	Ádám Szabó	Ákos Csordás	Tünde Krasznai	No judges' vote or final showdown: public votes alone decide who is eliminated and who ultimately wins	
Tóth's vote to eliminate	MDC	Lili Péterffy	Lili Batánovics	ByTheWay	Lili Batánovics	Fat Phoenix	Lili Péterffy	Ádám Szabó	Tünde Krasznai	No judges' vote or final showdown: public votes alone decide who is eliminated and who ultimately wins	
Alföldi's vote to eliminate	MDC	Marcell Tóth	Anikó Eckert	ByTheWay	Ádám Szabó	Fat Phoenix	Ádám Szabó	Ádám Szabó	Ákos Csordás	No judges' vote or final showdown: public votes alone decide who is eliminated and who ultimately wins	
Eliminated	MDC; 3 from 4 votes Majority	Marcell Tóth; 2 from 4 votes Deadlock	Anikó Eckert; 3 from 4 votes Majority	ByTheWay; 2 from 4 votes Deadlock	Lili Batánovics; 3 from 4 votes Majority	Fat Phoenix; 3 from 4 votes Majority	Lili Péterffy; 2 from 4 votes Deadlock	Ádám Szabó; 3 from 4 votes Majority	Ákos Csordás; 2 from 4 votes Deadlock	Tünde Krasznai; 3rd Place	ByTheWay; 2nd Place
Eliminated	MDC; 3 from 4 votes Majority	Marcell Tóth; 2 from 4 votes Deadlock	Anikó Eckert; 3 from 4 votes Majority	ByTheWay; 2 from 4 votes Deadlock	Lili Batánovics; 3 from 4 votes Majority	Fat Phoenix; 3 from 4 votes Majority	Lili Péterffy; 2 from 4 votes Deadlock	Ádám Szabó; 3 from 4 votes Majority	Ákos Csordás; 2 from 4 votes Deadlock	Tünde Krasznai; 3rd Place	Dóra Danics; 1st Place

== Live Shows ==
=== Week 1 (12–13 October) ===
- Theme: Songs from the toplists
- Celebrity performer: Gergő Oláh ("Érted élek")
- Group performance: "We Own the Night" and "Valami más"

A summary of the contestants' performances on the first live show and results show, along with the results.
Act	Order	Song	Result
MDC	1	"Help!"	Bottom two
Lili Péterffy	2	"Wrecking Ball"	Safe
Marcell Tóth	3	"Don't You Worry Child"	Safe
Márk Bozsek	4	"Can't Hold Us"	Safe
Lili Batánovics	5	"Son of a Preacher Man"	Safe
Ádám Szabó	6	"Love Me Again"	Safe
Anikó Eckert	7	"The Golden Age"	Bottom two
Ákos Csordás	8	"Superstition"	Safe
Fat Phoenix	9	"Humpin' Around"	Safe
Tünde Krasznai	10	"Crazy"	Safe
ByTheWay	11	"Blurred Lines"	Safe
Dóra Danics	12	"The House of the Rising Sun"	Safe
Final showdown details
MDC	1	"I Don't Want to Miss a Thing"	Eliminated
Anikó Eckert	2	"Turning Tables"	Safe

Judge's vote to eliminate

- Alföldi: MDC
- Szikora: Anikó Eckert
- Tóth: MDC
- Geszti: MDC

=== Week 2 (19–20 October) ===
- Theme: World tour
- Celebrity performer: Anima Sound System ("Wonder")
- Group performance: "Fire with Fire"

A summary of the contestants' performances on the second live show and results show, along with the results.
Act	Order	Song	Result
Marcell Tóth	1	"I Knew You Were Trouble"	Bottom two
Lili Batánovics	2	"Something's Got a Hold on Me"	Safe
ByTheWay	3	"Cups"	Safe
Anikó Eckert	4	"Black Heart"	Safe
Márk Bozsek	5	"The Lazy Song"	Safe
Lili Péterffy	6	"Monday Morning"	Bottom two
Ákos Csordás	7	"She's Like the Wind"	Safe
Tünde Krasznai	8	"Don't Cry for Louie"	Safe
Fat Phoenix	9	"Crucified"	Safe
Dóra Danics	10	"Valerie"	Safe
Ádám Szabó	11	"Álomarcú lány"	Safe
Final showdown details
Marcell Tóth	1	"Here Without You"	Eliminated
Lili Péterffy	2	"Varázsolj a szívemmel"	Safe

Judge's vote to eliminate

- Alföldi: Marcell Tóth
- Tóth: Lili Péterffy
- Szikora: Marcell Tóth
- Geszti: Lili Péterffy

As both acts got 2 votes, they went to deadlock and Marcell Tóth was eliminated.

=== Week 3 (26–27 October) ===
- Theme: Autumn legends
- Celebrity performer: Bermuda ("London"), Enikő Muri ("Maradj még!")
- Group performance: "Best Song Ever"

A summary of the contestants' performances on the third live show and results show, along with the results.
Act	Order	Song	Result
Fat Phoenix	1	"Can't Get You Out of My Head"	Safe
Anikó Eckert	2	"Back to Black"	Bottom two
Ákos Csordás	3	"Thnks fr th Mmrs"	Safe
Lili Péterffy	4	"Mikor"	Safe
Márk Bozsek	5	"Sex on Fire"	Safe
Lili Batánovics	6	"Unfaithful"	Bottom two
Ádám Szabó	7	"Sweet Dreams (Are Made of This)"	Safe
Dóra Danics	8	"Márti dala"	Safe
ByTheWay	9	"Africa"	Safe
Tünde Krasznai	10	"Blue Jeans"	Safe
Final showdown details
Anikó Eckert	1	"When You're Gone"	Eliminated
Lili Batánovics	2	"És mégis"	Safe

Judge's vote to eliminate

- Alföldi: Anikó Eckert
- Tóth: Lili Batánovics
- Szikora: Anikó Eckert
- Geszti: Anikó Eckert

=== Week 4 (2–3 November) ===
- Theme: Quiet songs
- Celebrity performer: Animal Cannibals ("Minden változik")
- Group performance: "Perfect Day", "Nincs baj! Tűz van!"

A summary of the contestants' performances on the fourth live show and results show, along with the results.
Act	Order	Song	Result
Lili Batánovics	1	"Queen of the Night"	Safe
Ákos Csordás	2	"Never Tear Us Apart"	Bottom two
ByTheWay	3	"Radioactive"	Bottom two
Tünde Krasznai	4	"Family Portrait"	Safe
Ádám Szabó	5	"Ladies' Choice"	Safe
Fat Phoenix	6	"Éjjel-nappal Budapest"	Safe
Dóra Danics	7	"Piece of My Heart"	Safe
Lili Péterffy	8	"Je Veux"	Safe
Márk Bozsek	9	"Féltelek"	Safe
Final showdown details
Ákos Csordás	1	"Jelenés"	Safe
ByTheWay	2	"Read All About It, Pt. III"	Return

Judge's vote to eliminate

- Tóth: ByTheWay
- Szikora: Ákos Csordás
- Alföldi: ByTheWay
- Geszti: Ákos Csordás

As both acts got 2 votes, they went to deadlock and ByTheWay were eliminated.

=== Week 5 (9–10 November) ===
- Theme: Divas and Heartbreakers
- Celebrity performers: Sugarloaf and Csaba Vastag ("Megküzdök érted")
- Group performance: "When We Stand Together"

A summary of the contestants' performances on the fifth live show and results show, along with the results.
Act	Order	Song	Result
Lili Péterffy	1	"Welcome to Burlesque"	Safe
Ádám Szabó	2	"Szállj velem!"	Bottom two
Ákos Csordás	3	"Csillag vagy fecske"	Safe
Lili Batánovics	4	"Left Outside Alone"	Bottom two
Fat Phoenix	5	"Survivor"	Safe
Dóra Danics	6	"Itt és most"	Safe
Tünde Krasznai	7	"Total Eclipse of the Heart"	Safe
ByTheWay	8	"Locked Out of Heaven"	Safe
Duet
Lili Batánovics & Ádám Szabó	1	"Nobody Wants to Be Lonely"	
Dóra Danics & Ákos Csordás	2	"The Lady Is a Tramp"	
Tünde Krasznai & Fat Phoenix	3	"Summer Wine"	
Lili Péterffy & ByTheWay	4	"Broken Strings"	
Final showdown details
Lili Batánovics	1	"I Will Always Love You"	Eliminated
Ádám Szabó	2	"Rule the World"	Safe

Judge's vote to eliminate

- Alföldi: Ádám Szabó
- Tóth: Lili Batánovics
- Szikora: Lili Batánovics
- Geszti: Lili Batánovics

Márk Bozsek withdrew this week after deciding he could not commit to the competition. Therefore, ByTheWay returned to the competition.

=== Week 6 (16–17 November) ===
- Theme: Brilliance, luster and beauty
- Celebrity performers: Roy & Ádám feat. Maszkura ("Visszasírom"), Adél Csobot ("Forog a film")
- Group performance: "Éld át"

A summary of the contestants' performances on the sixth live show and results show, along with the results.
Act	Order	Song	Result
ByTheWay	1	"Szabadítsd fel!"	Safe
Lili Péterffy	2	"Beauty and a Beat"	Safe
Ákos Csordás	3	"Rumour Has It"/"Someone like You"	Safe
Dóra Danics	4	"Believe"	Safe
Fat Phoenix	5	"Why You Wanna Trip on Me"	Bottom two
Tünde Krasznai	6	"I Say a Little Prayer" (Hungarian)	Bottom two
Ádám Szabó	7	"When I Was Your Man"	Safe
Final showdown details
Fat Phoenix	1	"Stop!"	Eliminated
Tünde Krasznai	2	"Úgy fáj"	Safe

Judge's vote to eliminate

- Geszti: Fat Phoenix
- Szikora: Tünde Krasznai
- Tóth: Fat Phoenix
- Alföldi: Fat Phoenix

=== Week 7 (23–24 November) ===
- Theme: Mentors Night
- Celebrity performers: Fábián Juli & Zoohacker
- Group performance: "Shine"

A summary of the contestants' performances on the seventh live show and results show, along with the results.
Act	Order	First song	Order	Second song	Result
Dóra Danics	1	"Look at Me"	9	"Nem a miénk az ég"	Safe
Ádám Szabó	2	"Jöjj még"	8	"Dear Darlin'"	Bottom two
Lili Péterffy	3	"Something New"	7	"Hello édes"	Bottom two
ByTheWay	4	"Torn"	12	"Létezem"	Safe
Tünde Krasznai	5	"Gyere kislány"	11	"The Silence"	Safe
Ákos Csordás	6	"More"	10	"A csapból is én folyok"	Safe
Final showdown details
Lili Péterffy	1	"Everytime We Touch"			Eliminated
Ádám Szabó	2	"Mindhalálig várni rád"			Safe

Judge's vote to eliminate

- Alföldi: Ádám Szabó
- Tóth: Lili Péterffy
- Szikora: Ádám Szabó
- Geszti: Lili Péterffy

As both acts got 2 votes, they went to deadlock and Lili Péterffy was eliminated.

=== Week 8 (30 November-1 December) ===
- Theme: Party anthems
- Celebrity performers: Zséda ("Hétköznapi Mennyország"/"Dance"), Tibor Kocsis ("Új holnap")
- Group performance: "No Worries"

A summary of the contestants' performances on the eighth live show and results show, along with the results.
Act	Order	First song	Order	Second song	Result
Ákos Csordás	1	"Induljon a banzáj!"	6	"Get Lucky"	Bottom two
Dóra Danics	2	"Firework"	7	"Egy elfelejtett dal"	Safe
ByTheWay	3	"Embertelen dal"	8	"Lady Marmalade"	Safe
Ádám Szabó	4	"Personal Jesus"	10	"Pálinka dal"	Bottom two
Tünde Krasznai	5	"Popzene"	9	"Express Yourself"	Safe
Final showdown details
Ádám Szabó	1	"Still Got the Blues (For You)"			Eliminated
Ákos Csordás	2	"Titkos szobák szerelme"			Safe

Judge's vote to eliminate

- Tóth: Ádám Szabó
- Alföldi: Ádám Szabó
- Szikora: Ákos Csordás
- Geszti: Ádám Szabó

=== Week 9 (7–8 December) ===
- Theme: Mentor's favourite song & Contestant's favourite song
- Celebrity performers: Beatrice ("8 óra munka"/"Azok a boldog szép napok"), Hooligans ("Mindörökké")
- Group performance: "Wake Me Up"

A summary of the contestants' performances on the ninth live show and results show, along with the results.
Act	Order	First song	Order	Second song	Result
Tünde Krasznai	1	"(I Can't Get No) Satisfaction"	6	"Örökké tart"	Bottom two
Ákos Csordás	2	"Egy elfelejtett szó"	5	"Nothing Else Matters"	Bottom two
Dóra Danics	3	"Set Fire to the Rain"	8	"Egyszer"	Safe
ByTheWay	4	"Ilyenek voltunk"	7	"Bohemian Rhapsody"	Safe
Duet
Ákos Csordás & ByTheWay	1	"One Way or Another (Teenage Kicks)"			
Dóra Danics & Tünde Krasznai	2	"Proud Mary"			
Final showdown details
Ákos Csordás	1	"Nézz az ég felé"			Eliminated
Tünde Krasznai	2	"Wild Horses"			Safe

Judge's vote to eliminate

- Geszti: Ákos Csordás
- Tóth: Tünde Krasznai
- Szikora: Tünde Krasznai
- Alföldi: Ákos Csordás

As both acts got 2 votes, they went to deadlock and Ákos Csordás was eliminated.

=== Week 10 (14/15 December) ===
==== Saturday Night ====
- Theme: One with a surprise duet partner
- Celebrity performers: Első Emelet ("A film forog tovább"), Kistehén Tánczenekar ("Milyen kár")
- Duets:
  - Tünde Krasznai and Nikolas Takács
  - ByTheWay and Márk Bozsek
  - Dóra Danics and László Dés

A summary of the contestants' performances on the tenth live show and results show, along with the results.
Act	Order	First song	Order	Second song	Order	Third song	Result
Tünde Krasznai	1	"Empire State of Mind (Part II) Broken Down"	4	"Nothing Compares 2 U"	7	"Hallelujah"	3rd
ByTheWay	2	"Troublemaker"	5	"The Winner Takes It All"	8	"Bless That Body"	Safe
Dóra Danics	3	"That Man"	6	"Nekem nem szabad"	9	"Hóesés"	Safe

==== Sunday Night ====
- Theme: Finalist's favourite Hungarian and English, previously performed song, Winner's Song
- Celebrity performers: Ildikó Keresztes & Recirquel ("Adj valamit"), Gabi Tóth ("Üdvözöl a Való Világ"), Csaba Vastag & Tibor Kocsis & Gergő Oláh
- Group performance: "Az élet vár", "Csak állj mellém"

A summary of the contestants' performances on the finals and results show, along with the results.
Act	Order	First song	Order	Second song	Order	Third song	Result
ByTheWay	1	"Létezem"	3	"Cups"	6	"Új út"	Runner-Up
Dóra Danics	2	"The House of the Rising Sun"	4	"Márti dala"	7	"Új út"	Winner
Duet
Dóra Danics & ByTheWay	5	"Ezt egy életen át kell játszani"					
