= Jacob Guay =

Canadian singer

Jacob (Jacob Guay)
- Born: Jacob Guay; April 8, 1999 (age 27)
- Origin: Beloeil, Quebec, Canada
- Genres: Pop, R&B
- Occupation: Singer
- Instruments: Vocals, guitar, piano, saxophone, trumpet, bass
- Years active: 2007–present
- Label: Orange Music
- Website: jacobmusique.com

Jacob Guay, better known as just Jacob (born 8 April 1999, in Quebec), is a Canadian singer dubbed as the French language answer to fellow Canadian Justin Bieber singing in both French and English.

== Earlier years ==
Jacob started singing on stage on various public occasions at year 4. At seven years of age, he appeared in the Quebec children talent program L'École des fans At the age of 8, he appeared in a competition program entitled Que feriez vous pour 100$. Performing in both French and English, Jacob Guay also plays the piano and guitar. His best friend Adam Al Atiya was his inspiration to start singing professionally, even though Adam moved to Winnipeg, Manitoba, Canada.

== Career ==
In November 2008, at 9 years of age, he sang a duet "Le plus grand amour qui soit" on the album of Italian Canadian singer Giorgia Fumanti on the latter's album entitled Je Suis.

He released his debut album Partir pour les étoiles on Orange Music record label in April 2009 when he was just ten. The official launching was at Montreal's Metropolis theater. He had a radio hit with "Un pas de plus" taken from the album. Another notable track from the album was "Question de paix" with lyrics by Donald Bilodeau and music by Johanne Lefebvre and Yves Frulla. Also singing "Dans un spoutnik" by Daniel Bélanger, "Berceuse pour maman" by Pat McCarthy, "Partir pour les étoiles" by Donald Bilodeau and music by French composer Moria Némo, even penning a song of his own "Stop! (Je suis amoureux)"

His first commercial single is the bilingual French/English single "Si jeune" featuring Karl Wolf and produced by Wolf and written by Jordan Kaahn, where Jacob sings the French lyrics and Karl Wolf the English lyrics in addition to another collaboration with Karl Wolf in "Dis-moi si tu vois".

In 2012, Jacob recorded his version of "All The Way" in both French and English, the former with Claudia Bouvette from Mixmania2 and the latter with Nadja. He also cooperated with Sunny in Jacob's release "Premier amour". His most recent music video in 2013 was "Blow My Mind" in 2013 in English with appearance by Quebec actor Antoine Olivier Pilon. jacob was also featured on the soundtrack of the film Spirit, l'étalon des plaines with the track titled "Deux frères sous le soleil".

On 8 October 2015, he participated in the second season of The Voice Kids France performing All of me by John Legend. Coach Jenifer is the only one to have turned around, giving her a place for the battles. He failed at the doors of the final on 16 October 2015.

== Discography ==
=== Albums ===
- 2009: Partir pour les étoiles [Orange Music Records]

=== Singles ===
- 2009: "Un pas de plus"
- 2010: "Si jeune" (feat. Karl Wolf)
- 2010: "Dis-moi si tu vois"
- 2012: "Premier amour"
- 2013: "Blow My Mind"
- 2015: "j'te voi partout"

=== Soundtrack ===
- 2012: "Deux frères sous le soleil", on French soundtrack of the song "Brothers Under the Sun" from the film Spirit, l'étalon des plaines
