= Saken =

Saken (Kazakh: Сәкен) is a Kazakh masculine given name. Notable people with the name include:

- Saken Seifullin (1894–1939), Kazakh poet, writer, and activist
- Saken Zhasuzakov (born 1957), Kazakh General and politician
