= Alaa Al Ansari =

Iraqi director

- Born: Alaa Al Ansari; 1 January 1980 (age 46); Baghdad, Iraq

Alaa Al Ansari (Arabic: علاء الانصاري) is an Iraqi director. He worked in the United Arab Emirates and Iraq for several years for Ara Art Production, where he directed many television works.

== Bio ==
Born in "Al-Mashkhab" in Baghdad in 1980, he married and studied at the Institute of Fine Arts in Baghdad and graduated from it.

== His works ==
- Kulna Al Iraq
- Shofoo Dubai
- Taraji And many TV series and programs

== Awards ==
- Almoreks Dor (Arabic: الموركس دور)
