= Jamie Sparks =

- Born: January 11, 1992 (age 33); London, United Kingdom
- Education: Arnold House School; Harrow School
- Alma mater: University of Bristol
- Occupation: Adventurer

Jamie Sparks (born 11 January 1992), is a British ocean rower and adventurer. On 27 January 2014 he, alongside fellow Briton Luke Birch, became the Guinness world record holders for the youngest pair to row across any ocean. In 2014, Sparks skippered the first ever unsupported row from Exmouth, Australia to the Seychelles. Sparks and his crew, consisting of Angus Collins, Hamish Khayat and Alex Simpson, were at sea for 71 days.

== Early life ==
He was born in London and attended Arnold House School in St John's Wood, Harrow School, and the University of Bristol where he received a BA in Archaeology & Anthropology.

== Atlantic Ocean Row ==
In December 2013, under the team name 2 Boys in a Boat, Jamie and his rowing partner Luke Birch set out from La Gomera in the Canary Islands to Antigua in the Caribbean. The pair rowed the 3000 miles in 2 hours on and 2 hours off shifts, all day and night. The crossing took them 54 days and they raised over £300,000 for Breast Cancer Care, a record total for the charity. Prior to the row, the crew had been on 5,000 calorie a day diets in order to gain muscle mass for the crossing.

== Indian Ocean Row ==
In July 2014, under the team Fast Row West, Sparks captained a crew of four on the first ever unsupported row from Exmouth, Australia to the Seychelles. The team became the fastest four-man crew to cross the Indian Ocean and the youngest four-man crew to cross any ocean. The intended destination had originally been the island of Mauritius however, massive equipment failure and extreme weather conditions led to the crew having to detour to the Seychelles.
