= Rashed Al-Majed =

Rashed Al-Majed راشد عبد الرحمن عبد العزيز الماجد
- Al-Majed in 2007

Background information
- Born: Rashed Abdul-Rahman Abdul-Aziz Almajid Al Khumhsi Al Anazi; 27 July 1969 (age 57); Manama, Bahrain
- Genre: Arabic Music
- Occupations: Singer, actor, songwriter
- Years active: 1984–present
- Website: Official Website

Rashed Al-Majed (Arabic: راشد الماجد; born 27 July 1969) is a Saudi singer, actor, musician, and record producer. He has been active since 1984.

Rashed Al-Majed is one of the most famous singers in the Middle East and has released almost 40 records. His songs often have emotional and romantic themes.

He has worked with the Saudi national operetta in Jenadriyah and has recorded with them more than eight times. He has performed numerous concerts in Saudi Arabia, Bahrain, Kuwait, Qatar, Oman, Egypt, Lebanon, Jordan, France, and the United Kingdom.

In addition, he is one of the largest producers in the Middle East, owning the Art Jazeera channel and a 50% stake in Platinum Records with MBC Group.

Rashed Al Majed is a famous Saudi singer known for his romantic songs and has released over 20 albums throughout his career.

== Early life ==
Rashed Almajid was born to a Saudi father and Bahraini mother on 27 July 1969 in Manama, Bahrain. Almajid has two brothers and four sisters. Almajid spent most of his childhood in Bahrain and obtained a high school diploma there. Almajid's artistic journey started at the age of 15, specifically when his teacher Hamad Al-Hamad appreciated his talent and predicted a bright future for him. His teacher also wrote many of the melodies of his early songs. Almajid's first song Hilwa Ya Al Bahrainiya (You Pretty Bahraini girl) was broadcast through Bahrain TV in the show Bab Asindibad (Sinbads Door).

== Career beginnings ==
Almajid's first public album went to market late 1984 which was called Aah Ya Qalbi (Oh My Heart) while Almajid was still fifteen. The album included five songs of which most were co-produced with his teacher Hamad Al-Hamad. The most famous of these songs was Al-Barha (Yesterday), which was the opening theme of the show Nimr Bin Idwan.

In the year 1986, Almajid released his second album titled Lee Bint Aam. A song from that album with the same title had the biggest success and the best response from fans especially in Arab States of the Persian Gulf.

In the year 1987, Almajid released the album Khal Al-Taghali in the style of Arabian Jalissa where a lot of Oud sounds were used. This year was a very important year in Almajid's career as it was the first time he was chosen to sing in the Ginadryah festival in Saudi Arabia. His performance lasted 45 minutes and was created and orchestrated by Al-Hamad, who used a lot of folklore and contemporary Arabian melodies.

In 1988 and 1989, Almajid released three albums: one Jalissa style and two studio albums. Some of the most famous hits from these albums include: Jatini Taqoli, Sayyad Al-Ghawani, Qasat Daiaa Abaid, Dai’atni, Wadatni, etc.

In 1990, Almajid released an album entitled, Tal Intithari, which was produced with Tawkeelat co-operation for artistic productions. In the same year, he also released the album Hoob Al-Watan which coincides with the Iraqi Invasion of Kuwait. Hoob Al-Watan (Love of Country) was one of the most praised works of Almajid and the first album to be released by Aljazeera Arts and Productions (Which Almajid later bought). Then in the year 1992, he released the album called Abshar Min. This album further elevated Almajid's status in the market. Two of the most famous songs of that album were: Ayooni and Ma Yanfa.

The year 1993 was considered to be a turning point for Almajid. He achieved stardom when he released two records that year: Adunya Hathooth and Allah Kareem. Songs from these albums spread vigorously throughout different radio and TV stations as they won many music awards. That same year, Almajid experimented with acting on the set of La Lilzawjat (TV series), but did not receive positive feedback from the viewers. He performed some of his songs in this TV series.

A year later, Almajid's fame was still growing due to his two albums Shartan Al Thahab and Aghla Habeeba, both released in 1994 and 1995 respectively. The album Shartan Al Thahab achieved outstanding sales.

In 1996, Almajid released a patriotic themed album entitled: Safwat Malook Al-Arab. The album release coincided with the healing and recovery of King Fahd of Saudi Arabia. For this album, he collaborated with the artist Mohammed Abdu and the poet Prince Khalid bin Faisal Al Saud.

In the same year, Almajid released the album Al-Musafir, which contained the song Al-Musafir that conquered the top of most Arab music charts. This album is Almajid's highest selling album; it is estimated at one million copies sold. Some of the notable songs of that album include: Sawlifak, Weinak Habibi, Wahshtni, Tafnan, Ash Min Shafak, Al-Mahba, etc.

In late 1997 and early 1998, Almajid released two new records: Asaudia (for the celebration of the Saudi football team reaching the World Cup) and Tadhak Aldunya. Both albums received excellent feedback and success.

Between 1999 and 2001, Almajid released another two albums: Ala Meen Tel'abha and Weily. The most distinct characteristics of Almajid's music emerged between 1997 and 2001 under the supervision of Kuwaiti producer Mishal Al-Arouj and co-production with Tarek Akif.

Almajid's career extended more than three decades. Throughout these years, he was able to expand Arabic music and establish a wide fan base throughout the Persian Gulf region and North Africa.

=== 2002–2006: The Emirati genre and singles ===
In 2002, Almajid released the album Mashkalni which sparked a lot of media attention, mainly due to the new direction Almajid was taking by adding a very distinct Emirati flavour to his songs. Hussain Al Jasmi (singer) helped in the composition of the album's title song Mashkalni. During that period, Almajid became very publicly active and went on many talk shows and interviews which allowed him to gain even more momentum in his new found style. It is worth noting that Emirati style music was not very widespread when Almajid incorporated it into his music. The most notable TV show Almajid went on was The Lebanese show Khaleik Fi Al-Bait, hosted by Zahi Wahbi.

In the year 2003, Almajid released the Iraqi-influenced song Ayoon within the album Hadaya. This song topped many Arab music charts even though the music video (which had the cost of US$120 thousand) received criticism in the media.

From 2003 onwards, Almajid stayed away from releasing studio albums and was content with releasing singles, mostly with an Emirati influence. He also had and continues to collaborate with singer and producer Fayez Al Saeed and the poetry of Sheikh Hamdan bin Mohammed bin Rashid al Maktoum, who writes under the name pen name Fazza.

== Studio albums ==
1985 : Ah Ya Qalbi
1986 : Lee Bint Aam
1987 : Khal Ataghli
1988 : Qasat Daia Abaid
1988 : Awal Abi Qurbak
1989 : Ya Mlieh
1990 : Hob Al-Watan
1990 : Tal intithari
1991 : Abshar Min Ayooni
1992 : Ya Subhan
1992 : Adunya Hathoth
1993 : Allah Kareem
1994 : Shartan Al Thahab
1995 : Aghla Habiba
1996 : Al-Musafir
1996 : Safwat Malook Al-Arab
1997 : Haflat Paris
1998 : Shamat Hayati
1998 : Asoudia
1998 : Tidhak Adunya
1999 : Ala Min Tilabha
2001 : Waili
2002 : Mashkalni
2003 : Al-Hadaia
2005 : Alhal alsaab
2007 : Salamat
2009 : Noor ayni
2013 : Moseeba
2024 : Estehala

== Singles ==
=== Charted songs ===
Title	Year	Peak chart positions		Album
Title	Year	KSA	MENA	Album
"Ash Salman" (with Abdul Majeed Abdullah)	2015	3	7	Non-album single

== Music videos ==
1992 : Adunya Hathoth
1993 : Ashki
1994 : Allah Yejeebak
1994 : Rajwai
1994 : AlQamra
1994 : Faman Allah Ya Al-Musafir
1994 : Serak Mai
1995 : Aghla Habiba
1994 : Al-Musafir
1996 : Habibi Maya
1996 : Washtni
1996 : Al-Maabha
1996 : Ya Ainha
1998 : La Ja’a Waqat Al-Jad
1998 : Ya Nasina
1998 : Ya Rashad
2002 : Waily
2002 : Mashkalni
2003 : Al-Ayoon
2005 : Nasinakum
2006 : Afnak
2007 : Sahi Lihum
2009 : Gaza
