= AP Dhillon discography =

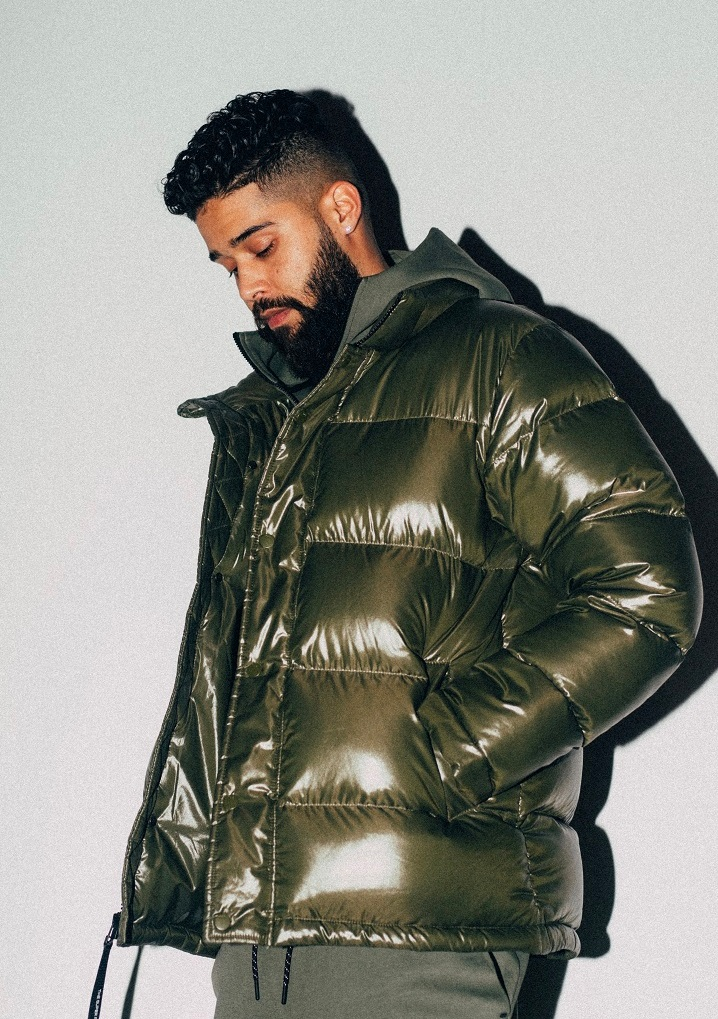
- Studio albums: 2
- EPs: 3
- Singles: 48
- As producer: 4

Indo-Canadian rapper-singer and record producer AP Dhillon discography includes two studio albums, three extended plays and 48 singles.

== Studio albums ==
Title	Details	Peak chart positions
Title	Details	CAN
Not by Chance (with Gurinder Gill and Money Musik)	Released: December 23, 2020; Label: Run-Up; Formats: Digital download, streaming	63
The Brownprint	Released: August 30, 2024; Label: Republic, Run-Up; Formats: Digital download, streaming	26

== Extended plays ==
Title	Details	Peak chart positions
Title	Details	CAN
Hidden Gems (with Gurinder Gill, Gminxr and Shinda Kahlon)	Released: November 21, 2021; Label: Run-Up; Formats: Digital download, streaming	—
Two Hearts Never Break the Same	Released: October 7, 2022; Label: Run-Up; Formats: Digital download, streaming	53
First of a Kind (Amazon original series)	Released: September 8, 2023; Labels: Mass Appeal India, Run-Up; Formats: Digital download, streaming	—

== Singles ==
=== As a lead artist ===
List of singles as lead artist with chart positions, showing year released and album name
Title	Year	Peak chart positions								Certifications	Music	Album
Title	Year	CAN	NZ Hot	IND	UK	UK Asian	UK Punjabi	WW	WW Excl. US	Certifications	Music	Album
"Fake" (with Gminxr)	2019	—	—	—	—	—	—	—	—		Gminxr	Non-album singles
"Top Boy"	2019	—	—	—	—	—	—	—	—		AP Dhillon	Non-album singles
"Arrogant" (with Shinda Kahlon and Gminxr)	2020	—	—	—	—	—	—	—	—		Gminxr	Non-album singles
"Feels" (with Gurinder Gill and Gminxr)	2020	—	—	—	—	—	—	—	—		Gminxr	Non-album singles
"Most Wanted" (with Gurinder Gill and Gminxr)	2020	—	—	—	—	—	—	—	—		Gminxr	Non-album singles
"Hustlin'" (with Gminxr and a4)	2020	—	—	—	—	—	—	—	—		Gminxr	Non-album singles
"Deadly" (with Gminxr)	2020	—	—	—	—	11	4	—	—		Gminxr	Non-album singles
"Kirsaan" (with Gurinder Gill & Gminxr)	2020	—	—	—	—	—	—	—	—		Gminxr & S-Kay	Non-album singles
"Droptop" (with Gurinder Gill & Gminxr)	2020	—	—	—	—	28	8	—	—		Gminxr	Non-album singles
"Majhail" (with Gurinder Gill & Manni Sandhu)	2020	—	—	—	—	1	1	—	—		Manni Sandhu	Non-album singles
"Excuses" (with Intense & Gurinder Gill)	2020	—	—	4	—	3	1	—	172	MC: Platinum	Intense	Non-album singles
"Free Smoke" (with Gurinder Gill)	2020	—	—	—	—	—	—	—	—		Manu	Non-album singles
"Brown Munde" (with Gurinder Gill, Gminxr & Shinda Kahlon)	2020	—	—	—	—	1	1	—	—		Gminxr	Non-album singles
"Toxic" (with Intense)	2020	—	—	—	—	3	3	—	—	MC: Gold	Intense	Non-album singles
"Foreigns" (with Gurinder Gill, Money Musik)	2020	—	—	—	—	2	6	—	—		Money Musik	Not by Chance
"Saada Pyaar" (with Money Musik)	2020	—	20	—	—	1	2	—	—		Money Musik	Not by Chance
"Fate" (with Gurinder Gill, Money Musik and Shinda Kahlon)	2020	—	33	—	—	—	5	—	—		Money Musik	Not by Chance
"Drip" (with Gurinder Gill, Money Musik and Duvy)	2020	—	—	—	—	—	17	—	—		Money Musik	Not by Chance
"Takeover" (with Gurinder Gill, Money Musik & AR Paisley)	2020	—	28	—	—	—	10	—	—		Money Musik	Not by Chance
"Chances" (with Gurinder Gill, Money Musik)	2020	—	29	—	—	—	4	—	—		Money Musik	Not by Chance
"Goat" (with Gurinder Gill, Money Musik)	2020	—	21	—	—	—	3	—	—		Money Musik	Not by Chance
"Idol" (featuring Straight Bank)	2021	—	—	—	—	—	—	—	—		J-Statik	Non-album singles
"Insane" (with Shinda Kahlon, Gminxr & Gurinder Gill)	2021	—	10	—	—	1	1	—	—	BPI: Silver	Gminxr & Pvli	Non-album singles
"Ma Belle" (with Amari)	2021	—	27	—	—	3	3	—	—		AP Dhillon	Non-album singles
"Against All Odds" (with Shinda Kahlon, Gminxr & Gurinder Gill)	2021	—	—	—	—	—	7	—	—		Gminxr	Hidden Gems
"Majhe Aale" (with Shinda Kahlon & Gurinder Gill) and Gminxr	2021	—	—	—	—	32	5	—	—		Gminxr	Hidden Gems
"Spaceship" (with Shinda Kahlon) and Gminxr	2021	—	—	—	—	8	4	—	—		Gminxr	Hidden Gems
"Tere Te" (with Gurinder Gill)	2021	—	30	—	—	3	3	—	—		AP Dhillon	Hidden Gems
"Desires" (with Gurinder Gill)	2021	—	22	—	—	2	2	—	—		AP Dhillon	Hidden Gems
"War" (with Gurinder Gill)	2021	—	—	—	—	—	8	—	—		Manu	Hidden Gems
"Summer High"	2022	79	15	13	—	1	1	—	—		Pvli & Sach	Two Hearts Never Break the Same
"Dil Nu" (with Shinda Kahlon)	2022	—	—	—	—	16	7	—	—		Rebbel	Two Hearts Never Break the Same
"All Night" (with Shinda Kahlon)	2022	—	—	—	—	7	5	—	—		Rebbel	Two Hearts Never Break the Same
"Hills"	2022	—	—	—	—	—	6	—	—		Chris Beats	Two Hearts Never Break the Same
"Wo Noor"	2022	—	39	—	—	4	3	—	—		Pvli	Two Hearts Never Break the Same
"Final Thoughts" (with Shinda Kahlon and Gminxr)	2022	—	—	—	—	—	9	—	—		Gminxr & Osrs	Two Hearts Never Break the Same
"True Stories" (with Shinda Kahlon)	2023	81	14	—	—	4	2	—	—		Gore Ocean	Non-album singles
"Sleepless"	2023	—	35	—	—	5	3	—	—		Castello Beats	Non-album singles
"With You"	2023	41	14	2	— (Note: "With You" did not enter the UK Singles Chart, but peaked at number 5 on The Independent Singles Breaker Chart, and at number 45 on The Independent Singles Chart.)	1	1	137	—		Rebbel	First of a Kind (from Amazon Original Series)
"Lifestyle" (with Shinda Kahlon)	2023	—	39	—	—	—	11	—	—		Yogic Beats	First of a Kind (from Amazon Original Series)
"Scars"	2023	—	36	—	—	20	9	—	—		Fantom	First of a Kind (from Amazon Original Series)
"Real Talk" (with Shinda Kahlon)	2024	—	—	—	—	11	6	—	—		AP Dhillon, Manu, Muddy, La+ch	Non-album singles
"Problems Over Peace" (with Stormzy)	2024	—	34	—	— (Note: "Problems Over Peace" did not enter the UK Singles Chart, but peaked at number 93 on Singles Sales Chart, and at number 89 on Singles Download Chart.)	1	1	—	—			Non-album singles
"Old Money"	2024	53	17	—	—	3	3	—	—			The Brownprint
"Losing Myself" (featuring Gunna)	2024	—	32	—	—	9	—	—	—			The Brownprint
"Bora Bora" (featuring Ayra Starr)	2024	—	—	—	—	6	—	—	—			The Brownprint
"315" (featuring Shinda Kahlon and Jazzy B)	2024	—	31	—	—	29	—	—	—			The Brownprint
"Never Let You Go"	2025											One Day It Will All Make Sense
"STFU"	2025											Okay STFU
"Thodi Si Daaru" (with Shreya Ghoshal)	2025	—	—	—	—	—	—	—	—			Non-album single
"Without Me"												

=== As a featured artist ===
List of singles as featured artist with chart positions, showing year released and album name
Title	Year	Peak chart positions								Certifications	Music	Album
Title	Year	CAN	NZ Hot	IND	UK	UK Asian	UK Punjabi	WW	WW Excl. US	Certifications	Music	Album
"Afsos" (Anuv Jain featuring AP Dhillon)	2025	88	21	—	—	—	—	—	—			Non-album single
"Aadat" (Yo Yo Honey Singh ft. AP Dhillon)	2025	—	—	—	—	—	—	—	—			51 Glorious Days

== Production discography ==
List of singles as music producer along with year release
Title	Year	Artists	Album
"Faraar" (Note: appearance in music video)	2019	Gurinder Gill, Shinda Kahlon	Non-album singles
"Top Boy"	2019	AP Dhillon	Non-album singles
"Ma Belle"	2021	AP Dhillon, Amari	Non-album singles
"Desires"	2021	AP Dhillon, Gurinder Gill	Hidden Gems
"Tere Te"	2021	AP Dhillon, Gurinder Gill	Hidden Gems
*All Tracks*	2024	AP Dhillon	The Brownprint
