= Sukha (musician) =

Canadian rapper

- Born: Sukhman Sodhi; 2 September 2003 (age 23); Toronto, Ontario, Canada
- Genres: Hip-hop; R&B; pop rap; pop
- Occupations: Rapper; singer; songwriter
- Instrument: Vocals
- Years active: 2022–present
- Labels: GK Universal, Collab Creations, Sodhi Music Inc

Sukhman Singh Sodhi (born 2 September 2003), known professionally as Sukha, is a Canadian rapper, singer and songwriter associated with Punjabi music.

== Early life ==
Sukhman Sodhi was born in Toronto, Ontario into a Punjabi Sikh family from Nawanshahr in Punjab, India, which he mentioned in his song "Regions" from his album By Any Means.

== Career ==
His tracks have appeared on the UK Asian, and UK Punjabi lists by OCC. His debut EP song "8 Asle" with Gurlez Akhtar charted on the Canadian Hot 100 charts.

In 2024, Sukha released the EP 2003, featuring contributions from Prodgk, Chani Nattan and Gurlez Akhtar.

In 2026, Sukha was featured in the "25 Under 25: Hip-Hop" list in Billboard India.

== Awards ==
Sukha received two Juno Award nominations at the Juno Awards of 2025, for Breakthrough Artist or Group of the Year and Album of the Year for his 2023 EP Undisputed.

== Discography ==
=== Studio albums ===
Title	Album details	Peak chart positions
Title	Album details	CAN
By Any Means	Released: March 28, 2025; Label: Self-released (Sukha, Sodhi Music Inc); Format: CD, digital download, streaming	37

=== Extended plays ===
Title	Details
Switchin’ Lanes (with Tegi Pannu)	Released: 26 May 2023; Music: Manni Sandhu, ProdGK; Label: Collab Creations; Format: Digital download, streaming
Undisputed	Released: 17 November 2023; Music: ProdGK, Gminxr; Label: Sukha; Format: Digital download, streaming
2003	Released: July 2024; Music: ProdGK, Jassa G, Puddi CM; Label: Sukha; Format: Digital download, streaming
Rumour Has It	Released: March 2026; Music: Manni Sandhu; Label: Collab Creations Ltd; Format: Digital download, streaming
BLINK TWICE	Released: November 2026; Music: Prodgk , Dr Zeus; Label: Sodhi Music Inc; Format: Digital download, streaming

=== Singles discography ===
Title	Year	Music	Peak chart position			Record Label	Album
Title	Year	Music	CAN	UK Asian	UK Punjabi	Record Label	Album
Siftaan	2022	ProdGK		—	—	Sukha	
Same Thing (featuring Harleen Khaira)	2023	ProdGK		17	13	Collab Creations	
Go To Sleep (with AR Paisley)	2023	ProdGK		—	—	Sunny Malton	
On Sight (with Tegi Pannu)	2023	ProdGK		20	15	Collab Creations	Switchin’ Lanes
Links (with Tegi Pannu)	2023	ProdGK		—	20	Collab Creations	Switchin’ Lanes
Obsession (with Tegi Pannu)	2023	Manni Sandhu		17	11	Collab Creations	Switchin’ Lanes
Tere Bina (with Tegi Pannu)	2023	Manni Sandhu		22	17	Collab Creations	Switchin’ Lanes
Making Moves (with Tegi Pannu)	2023	Manni Sandhu		—	—	Collab Creations	Switchin’ Lanes
Switchin’ Lanes (with Tegi Pannu)	2023	Manni Sandhu		14	9	Collab Creations	Switchin’ Lanes
No Safety (with Tegi Pannu)	2023	Manni Sandhu		12	5	Collab Creations	
Attraction	2023	ProdGK		—	—	Sukha	
Slowly	2023	ProdGK	—	34	—	Sukha	
8 Asle (featuring Gurlez Akhtar)	2023	ProdGK	55	1	1	Sukha	Undisputed
Armed	2023	ProdGK		14	8	Sukha	Undisputed
Roll With Me	2023	ProdGK	—	19	12	Sukha	Undisputed
21 Questions (featuring Jassa Dhillon)	2023	Gminxr and ProdGK		—	14	Sukha	Undisputed
Godfather	2023	ProdGK		21	10	Sukha	Undisputed
Troublesome	2023	Gminxr	—	—	17	Sukha	Undisputed
Sangdi	2024	Manni Sandhu	—	—	—		
Active	2024	ProdGK	—	—	—		
Ask 'Em	2024	ProdGK	—	—	—		
Dass Jatta (featuring Gurlez Akhtar)	2024	ProdGK	—	—	—		2003
Heat	2024	ProdGK	—	—	—		2003
Hey Luv	2024	ProdGK	—	—	—		2003
Credentials (featuring Channi Nattan)	2024	ProdGK	—	—	—		2003
In My Feels	2024	Jassa G	—	—	—		2003
Hundo (with Channi Nattan and Inderpal Moga)	2024	Mxrci	—	—	—		
Zehri	2025	ProdGK	—	—	—		By Any Means
Day & Night	2025	ProdGK	—	—	—		By Any Means
Janu Janu	2025	ProdGK	—	—	—		By Any Means
Regions (featuring Tegi Pannu)	2025	ProdGK	—	—	—		By Any Means
Pind Pehra (featuring Gurlez Akhtar)	2025	The Kidd	—	—	—		By Any Means
Dil Dardeh (feat. The PropheC and Navaan Sandhu)	2025	JayB Singh	—	—	—		By Any Means
Punjaban	2025	Manni Sandhu	—	—	—		By Any Means
On The Loose	2025	Money Musik	—	—	—		By Any Means
If You Knew Her	2025	Mxrci	—	—	—		
