= Intense (music producer) =

- Also known as: DJ Intense
- Born: Aneil Kainth
- Origin: Canada
- Genres: Hip-hop, pop, synthwave, EDM, RNB
- Occupation: Record producer Record executive
- Years active: 2003-present
- Label: Intense Music Group Double-Up Entertainment High Heat Music

Aneil Kainth known professionally as Intense is a Canadian record producer and Music executive based in Surrey, BC. He is known for his association with Punjabi music. He worked with numerous artists including Diljit Dosanjh, AP Dhillon, Karan Aujla, Gurinder Gill, Sidhu Moose Wala, Jasmine Sandlas and many more. His numorous tracks have charted on UK Asian and Billboard Global.

== Discography ==
=== Studio album ===
Title	Details
124	Released: August 13, 2016; Label: Intense Music Group; Format: Digital download, streaming
Exhale	Released: December 20, 2018; Label: Intense Music Group; Format: Digital download, streaming
Twenty Two	Released: February 22, 2022; Label: Double-UP; Format: Digital download, streaming
Double-UP: The Family Vol 1	Released: Label: Double-UP; Format: Digital download, streaming
Heat	Released: Label: Double-UP; Format: Digital download, streaming
Intense	Released: Label: Self/Double-UP; Format: Digital download, streaming

== Singles discography ==
Title	Year	Peak chart positions				Label	Certifications	Album
Title	Year	IND	UK Asian	UK Punjabi	WW excl. US	Label	Certifications	Album
Suit (Guru Randhawa & Arjun featuring Intense)	2016	—	4	—	—	T-Series		
Vachari (Jasmine Sandlas)	2016	—	37	—	—	T-Series		
Soch (with Karan Aujla)	2016	—	—	—	—	Intense Music	MC: Gold	124
Sip Sip (Jasmine Sandlas featuring Garry Sandhu & Intense)	2018		1	—		T-Series		
Famous (Sidhu Moose Wala featuring Intense)	2018		17			Lavish Squad		
Bhang De Bhaane (with Sidhu Moose Wala & Sharan Kaur Panesar)	2018		33	—		Intense Music		Exhale
Round (with Bunny Gill)	2019					Intense Music		
Area (with Bunny Gill)	2019					Intense Music		
Midnight (with Aardee)	2019	—	—	—		Intense Music		Midnight
Teri Yaad (Garry Sandhu)	2019			—		Intense Music		Midnight
Complicated (featuring Aman)	2019					Intense Music		Midnight
Sahiba (featuring Simiran Kaur Dhadli)	2019		15	—		Intense Music		Midnight
Illegal Weapon 2.0 (Jasmine Sandlas & Garry Sandhu)	2020		1	—		Intense Music		
Dabde Ni (with Dilpreet Dhillon)	2020			—		Intense Music		
Excuses (with AP Dhillon & Gurinder Gill)	2020	4	3	1	172	Intense/ Run Up Records	MC: Platinum	
Toxic (with AP Dhillon)	2020		3	3		Intense/ Run Up Records	MC: Gold	
Loaded (with Hrjxt)	2021					Double Up Entertainment		
Roses (with Hrjxt)	2021			—		Double Up Entertainment		
Heartless (with Hrjxt)	2021					Double Up Entertainment		
Kyon (with Robyn Sandhu)	2021		—	—		Double Up Entertainment		
Alone (with Tavnoor)	2021		—			Double Up Entertainment		
Umbrella (Diljit Dosanjh)	2021		3	2		Double Up Entertainment	MC: Gold	
Popin’ Seals (with 604Blizzy and Payroll Giovanni)	2021			—		Intense Music		First Take
12 (with Hrjxt)	2021					Double Up Entertainment		
One Sided (with Robyn Sandhu)	2021					Robyn Sandhu		
Save Your Tears (with Chani Nattan and Inderpal Moga)	2021			—		Intense		The Hills
Zakhm (with Hrjxt)	2021					Double Up Entertainment		
Unforgettable (with Diljit Dosanjh)	2021		22	9		Double Up Entertainment		
Broken (with Hrjxt)	2021					Double Up Entertainment		
City (with a4)	2021		—	—		a4 Secret		
Number 5 (Diljit Dosanjh)	2021					Tips Punjabi		Honsla Rakh soundtrack
Angels (with Hrjxt)	2022	—			—	Double Up Entertainment		Twenty Two
Peaches (Diljit Dosanjh featuring Anne-Marie) (Produced with Camerong Gower Poole)	2022		—	—		Diljit Dosanjh (Famous Studios)		Drive Thru
Drip (with Hrjxt)	2022			—		Double Up Entertainment		Double Up: The Family volume 1
Teri Ah (with Tavnoor)	2022		—			Double Up Entertainment		Double Up: The Family volume 1
Taare (with Manna Datte Aala)	2022			—		Double Up Entertainment		Double Up: The Family volume 1
Yaad (with Tavnoor)	2022					Double Up Entertainment		Double Up: The Family volume 1
Maan Jawani Da (with Harpreet Sran)	2022			—		Double Up Entertainment		Double Up: The Family volume 1
City Lights (with Gurtêj)	2023					Momento Morri		
Your Loss (with Harpreet Sran)	2023					Double Up Entertainment		Dreamworld
Radar (with Hrjxt and Trappo Stoke)	2023		—			Double Up Entertainment		
Brand New (with Hrjxt)	2023			—		Double Up Entertainment		Heat
Jhoote (with Jassi Sidhu featuring Tavnoor)	2023		—			Kharishma Production		
Late Night Lover (with Mehar Vaani and Sultaan)	2023			—		Intense Music		
Members Only (with G Sidhu)	2023		—			Intense Music		Members Only
Two (with 604Blizzy & Peezy)	2023			—		Double Up Entertainment		
Last Night (with Virginia to Vegas)	2025		—			Wax Records		

== Production discography ==
Title	Year	Peak chart positions					Label	Album
Title	Year	IND	NZ Hot	UK Asian	UK Punjabi	WW excl. US	Label	Album
This Singh is so Stylish (Diljit Dosanjh featuring Ikka)	2014						Diljit Dosanjh, MTV Spoken Word	
Suit (Guru Randhawa & Arjun featuring Intense)	2016			4				
Vachari (Jasmine Sandlas)	2016			37				
Soch (with Karan Aujla)	2016	-	-	—			Intense Music	124
Gol Gappe vs Daaru (Karan Aujla)	2017							
Illegal Weapon (Garry Sandhu & Jasmine Sandlas)	2017			3				
Its All About You (Sidhu Moose Wala)	2018							
Sip Sip (Jasmine Sandlas featuring Garry Sandhu & Intense)	2018			1				
Famous (Sidhu Moose Wala featuring Intense)	2018			17				
Dark Love (Sidhu Moose Wala)	2018							
Bhang De Bhaane (with Sidhu Moose Wala & Sharan Kaur Panesar)	2018			33			Intense Music	Exhale
Round (with Bunny Gill)	2019						Intense Music	
Area (with Bunny Gill)	2019						Intense Music	
Midnight (with Aardee)	2019						Intense Music	Midnight
Teri Yaad (Garry Sandhu)	2019						Intense Music	Midnight
Complicated (featuring Aman)	2019						Intense Music	Midnight
Sahiba (featuring Simiran Kaur Dhadli)	2019			15			Intense Music	Midnight
Illegal Weapon 2.0 (Jasmine Sandlas & Garry Sandhu)	2020			1			Intense Music	
Dabde Ni (with Dilpreet Dhillon)	2020						Intense Music	
Excuses (with AP Dhillon & Gurinder Gill)	2020	4		3	1	172	Intense/ Run Up Records	
RiRi (Diljit Dosanjh)	2021				3		Diljit Dosanjh (Famous Studios)	
Loaded (with Hrjxt)	2021						Double Up Entertainment	
Roses (with Hrjxt)	2021						Double Up Entertainment	
Heartless (with Hrjxt)	2021						Double Up Entertainment	
Kyon (with Robyn Sandhu)	2021						Double Up Entertainment	
Alone (with Tavnoor)	2021						Double Up Entertainment	
Umbrella (Diljit Dosanjh)	2021			3	2		Double Up Entertainment	
Popin’ Seals (with 604Blizzy and Payroll Giovanni)	2021						Intense Music	First Take
12 (with Hrjxt)	2021						Double Up Entertainment	
One Sided (with Robyn Sandhu)	2021						Robyn Sandhu	
Lover (Diljit Dosanjh)	2021			9			Diljit Dosanjh (Famous Studios)	Moon Child Era
Black & White (Diljit Dosanjh)	2021			11			Diljit Dosanjh (Famous Studios)	Moon Child Era
Vibe (Diljit Dosanjh)	2021			2			Diljit Dosanjh (Famous Studios)	Moon Child Era
Luna (Diljit Dosanjh)	2021						Diljit Dosanjh (Famous Studios)	Moon Child Era
Save Your Tears (with Chani Nattan and Inderpal Moga)	2021						Intense	The Hills
Zakhm (with Hrjxt)	2021						Double Up Entertainment	
Unforgettable (with Diljit Dosanjh)	2021			22	9		Double Up Entertainment	
Broken (with Hrjxt)	2021						Double Up Entertainment	
City (with a4)	2021							
Number 5 (Diljit Dosanjh)	2021						Tips Punjabi	Honsla Rakh soundtrack
Angels (with Hrjxt)	2022						Double Up Entertainment	Twenty Two
Peaches (Diljit Dosanjh)	2022		31	1	1		Diljit Dosanjh (Famous Studios)	Drive Thru
Lemonade (Diljit Dosanjh)	2022			7	6		Diljit Dosanjh (Famous Studios)	Drive Thru
Caviar (Diljit Dosanjh)	2022			—	11		Diljit Dosanjh (Famous Studios)	Drive Thru
Red Chilli (Diljit Dosanjh)	2022			6	5		Diljit Dosanjh (Famous Studios)	Drive Thru
Vanilla (Diljit Dosanjh)	2022			—	9		Diljit Dosanjh (Famous Studios)	Drive Thru
Peaches (Diljit Dosanjh featuring Anne-Marie) (Produced with Camerong Gower Poole)	2022		—	—	—		Diljit Dosanjh (Famous Studios)	Drive Thru
Drip (with Hrjxt)	2022		—		—		Double Up Entertainment	Double Up: The Family volume 1
Teri Ah (with Tavnoor)	2022			—			Double Up Entertainment	Double Up: The Family volume 1
Taare (with Manna Datte Aala)	2022				—		Double Up Entertainment	Double Up: The Family volume 1
Yaad (with Tavnoor)	2022		—				Double Up Entertainment	Double Up: The Family volume 1
Maan Jawani Da (with Harpreet Sran)	2022		—		—		Double Up Entertainment	Double Up: The Family volume 1
Balle Jatta (Diljit Dosanjh)	2022		—	—	18		Diljit Dosanjh	
City Lights (with Gurtêj)	2023							
Your Loss (with Harpreet Sran)	2023		—				Double Up Entertainment	Dreamworld
Radar (with Hrjxt and Trappo Stoke)	2023			—			Double Up Entertainment	
Brand New (with Hrjxt)	2023				—		Double Up Entertainment	Heat
Jhoote (with Jassi Sidhu featuring Tavnoor)	2023			—				
Late Night Lover (with Mehar Vaani and Sultaan)	2023		—		—		Intense Music	
Members Only (with G Sidhu)	2023			—			Intense Music	Members Only
Two (with 604Blizzy & Peezy)	2023				—		Double Up Entertainment	
Last Night (with Virginia to Vegas)	2025		—				Wax Records	
