= Shinda Kahlon =

Indo-Canadian singer and rapper

- Born: Satinderpal Singh Kahlon; Dujowal, Amritsar, Punjab, India
- Origin: Punjab, India; Victoria, BC, Canada
- Genres: Hip hop; R&B; pop rap
- Occupations: Singer; rapper; songwriter
- Instrument: Vocals
- Years active: 2019–present
- Labels: Run-Up; Mass Appeal
- Member of: Run-Up

Satinderpal Singh Kahlon known professionally as Shinda Kahlon is an Indo-Canadian rapper, singer and songwriter associated with Punjabi music. Four of his singles have peaked on UK Asian and Punjabi charts by Official Charts Company; "Majhail" and "Brown Munde" have topped the charts. Kahlon released his debut EP Not By Chance in December 2020. Kahlon, alongside his label-mates AP Dhillon, Gurinder Gill and Gminxr works as a group under their label Run-Up Records.

== Biography ==
Kahlon was born to a Sikh family in Dujowal, Amritsar district, Punjab, India and now is based out of Victoria, British Columbia. He started as songwriter for track "Fake" by AP Dhillon in 2019. Followed by a single "Faraar" with Gurinder Gill and AP Dhillon (credited as producer) under their own label Run-Up Records.

== Discography ==
=== Collaborative albums ===
Title	Details	Peak chart positions
Title	Details	CAN
Not By Chance (with AP Dhillon and Gurinder Gill)	Released: 23 December 2020; Label: Run-Up Records; Format: Digital download, streaming	63

=== Extended plays ===
Title	Details	Peak chart positions
Title	Details	CAN
Hidden Gems (with AP Dhillon, Gminxr and Gurinder Gill)	Released: 21 November 2021; Label: Run-Up Records; Format: Digital download, streaming	—

== Singles discography ==
Title	Year	Peak chart positions					Music	Album
Title	Year	NZ Hot	IND	UK Asian	UK Punjabi	WW (Triller)	Music	Album
"Faraar" (with Gurinder Gill)	2019	—		—	—	—	AP Dhillon	
Arrogant (with AP Dhillon)	2020	—	—	—	—	—	Gminxr	
"Brown Munde" (with Gurinder Gill & AP Dhillon)	2020	—		1	1	3	Gminxr	
"Fate" (with Gurinder Gill & AP Dhillon)	2020	33	—	—	5	—	Money Musik	Not By Chance
"Insane" (with Gurinder Gill & AP Dhillon)	2021	10		1	—	—	Gminxr	Non-album single
Spaceship (with AP Dhillon)	2021	—		—	—		Gminxr	Hidden Gems
"Against All Odds" (with Gurinder Gill & AP Dhillon)	2021	—		—	—	—	Gminxr	Hidden Gems
"Majhe Alle" (with Gurinder Gill & AP Dhillon)	2021	—		—	—	—	Gminxr	Hidden Gems
"Dil Nu" (with AP Dhillon)	2022	—	—	16	—	—	Rebbel	Two Hearts Never; Break The Same
"All Night" (with AP Dhillon)	2022	—	—	—	—	—	Rebbel	Two Hearts Never; Break The Same
"Final Thoughts" (with AP Dhillon)	2022	—	—	—	—	—	Gminxr & Osrs	Two Hearts Never; Break The Same
True Stories (with AP Dhillon)	2023						Gore Ocean	
Lifestyle (with AP Dhillon)	2023						Yogic Beats	First Of A Kind
Real Talk (with AP Dhillon)	2024							

== Songwriting discography ==
List of singles credited as songwriter/lyricist
Title	Year	Performer(s)	Music	Album	Additional writers
"Fake"	2019	AP Dhillon	Gminxr		—
"Faraar"	2019	Gurinder Gill	AP Dhillon		—
"Arrogant"	2020	AP Dhillon, Shinda Kahlon	Gminxr		—
"Feels"	2020	Dhillon, Gill	Gminxr		—
"Don’t Test"	2020	Gill	Gminxr		—
"Deadly"	2020	Dhillon	Gminxr		AP Dhillon
"Kirsaan"	2020	Dhillon, Gill	Gminxr & S-Kay		—
"Majhail"	2020	Dhillon, Gill	Manni Sandhu		—
"Brown Munde"	2020	Dhillon, Gill, Kahlon	Gminxr		—
"Foreigns"	2020	Dhillon, Gill	Money Musik	Not by Chance	—
"Saada Pyaar"	2020	Dhillon	Money Musik	Not by Chance	—
"Fate"	2020	Dhillon, Gill, Kahlon	Money Musik	Not by Chance	AP Dhillon, Gurinder Gill
"Drip"	2020	Dhillon, Gill, Duvy	Money Musik	Not by Chance	Duvy
"Takeover"	2020	Dhillon, Gill, AR Paisley	Money Musik	Not by Chance	AP Dhillon, Gurinder Gill, AR Paisley
"Chances"	2020	Dhillon, Gill	Money Musik	Not by Chance	—
"Insane"	2021	Dhillon, Gill, Kahlon	Gminxr & Pvli		—
"Against All Odds"	2021	Dhillon, Gill,	Gminxr	Hidden Gems	—
"Majhe Aale"	2021	Dhillon, Gill,	Gminxr	Hidden Gems	—
"Spaceship"	2021	Dhillon, Kahlon	Gminxr	Hidden Gems	—
"Tere Te"	2021	Dhillon, Gill	AP Dhillon	Hidden Gems	—
"Desires"	2021	Dhillon, Gill	AP Dhillon	Hidden Gems	—
"War"	2021	Dhillon, Gill	Manu	Hidden Gems	—
"Summer High"	2022	AP Dhillon	Pvli & Sach	Two Hearts Never; Break The Same	—
"Dil Nu"	2022	Dhillon, Kahlon	Rebbel	Two Hearts Never; Break The Same	—
"All Night"	2022	Dhillon, Kahlon	Rebbel	Two Hearts Never; Break The Same	AP Dhillon, Riley Chernoff, Rob Benvegnu, Kramer White
"Final Thoughts"	2022	Dhillon, Kahlon	Gminxr & Osrs	Two Hearts Never; Break The Same	AP Dhillon, Gminxr, Patrick McKenzie, Brendon Mcdonald, Rob Benvegnu, Kramer White
"Moments"	2023	Gill	Gminxr	Hard Choices	—
"True Stories"	2023	Dhillon, Kahlon	Gore Ocean	—	—

== Filmography ==
=== Web series ===
Year	Title	Role	Notes
2023	AP Dhillon: First of a Kind	Himself	Amazon Prime original

=== Television ===
Year	Title	Role	Notes
2026	The Great Indian Kapil Show	Guest	On Netflix
