= 0 to 100 =

0 to 100 may refer to:

- 0 to 100 km/h, a measure of acceleration (or, less commonly, 0 to 100 mph)
- The act of losing one's temper (slang)
- "0 to 100" (song), 2022, by Indian rapper Sidhu Moose Wala
- "0 to 100 / The Catch Up", 2014 single by Drake
