= Abhijit Vaghani =

Indian music composer and producer

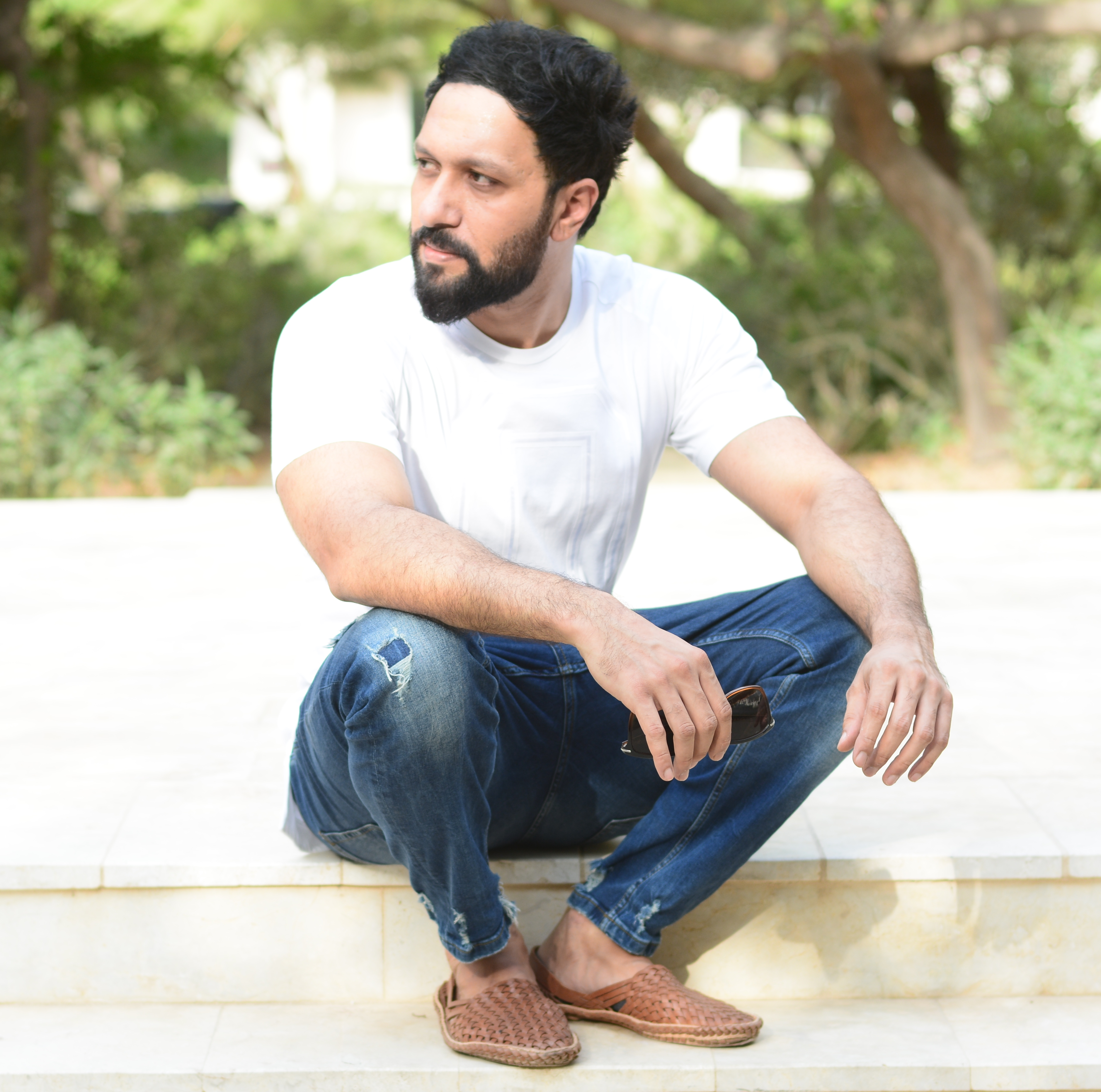

Background information
- Origin: Mumbai, India
- Occupations: Music composer, Music Producer

Abhijit Vaghani is an Indian film score composer, music composer and music producer.

== Personal life ==
Abhijit Vaghani is a Gujarati. He received a diploma in Sound Engineering from the School of Audio Engineering (SAE), London. He was originally a Hindu but he married a Pakistani Muslim woman called Suriya for which he had to convert to Islam.

== Music career ==
Abhijit Vaghani has produced music for Hindi films like 'Dishoom', 'Azhar', 'Ki & Ka', 'Sarbjit', 'Airlift' and 'Bajrangi Bhaijaan' and composed the background score for 50 films, He debuted as a music composer with the single, 'Pyaar Manga Hai'. His other notable works are the remixing popular Hindi retro songs like "Pal Pal Dil Ke Paas" and "Halka Halka Suroor".

=== As music producer ===
Year	Film	Song
2006	Golmaal: Fun Unlimited	Golmaal(Title Track)
2006	Malamaal Weekly	Hansani O Meri Hansani (Remix)
2008	Superstar	Mann Tu Talbat (Remix)
2008	Superstar	Mann Tu Talbat (Spanish Mix)
2008	Oye Lucky! Lucky Oye!	Superchor
2008	Oye Lucky! Lucky Oye!	Jugni (remix)
2008	Oye Lucky! Lucky Oye!	Hooriya
2009	Billu	Music Producer
2009	Kaminey	Dhan Te Nan (Remix)
2010	Pyaar Impossible	Alisha (Remix)
2010	Pyaar Impossible	Pyaar Impossible ( Remix)
2010	Teen Patti	Neeyat (Remix)
2010	Teen Patti	Teen Patti (Remix)
2010	Badmaash Company	Ayaashi (remix)
2010	Knock Out	Jab Jab (Remix)
2010	Knock Out	Knockout (remix)
2010	Golmaal 3	Golmaal (Title Track)
2010	Band Baaja Baraat	Ainvayi Ainvayi (remix)
2011	Dum Maaro Dum	Dum Maaro Dum (Remix)
2011	Pyaar Ka Punchnama	Bann Gaya Kutta
2011	Thank you	Razia (Remix)
2011	Thank you	Pyaar Do Pyaar Lo (Remix)
2011	Ladies vs Ricky Bahl	Aadat Se Majboor(Remix)
2011	Bbuddah... Hoga Terra Baap	Buddha Hoga Tera Baap (Title Track)
2011	Rascals	Rascals (Dance Mix)
2011	Rascals	Rascals – Shake It Saiyyan (Hip Hop Mix)
2011	Aazaan	Khuda Ke Liye (Remix)
2011	Aazaan	Afreen (Dessert Mix)
2011	Ra.One	Chammak Challo (Remix)
2011	Desi Boyz	Desi Boyz (Remix)
2012	Ek Main Aur Ekk Tu	Aahatein (Remix)
2012	Agent Vinod	I Will Do The Talking Tonight (Remix)
2012	Jannat 2	Sang Hoon Tere
2012	Jannat 2	Jannatein Kahan (Power Ballad)
2012	Ishaqzaade	Pareshaan (Remix)
2012	Ishaqzaade	Jhalla Wallah (Remix)
2012	Cocktail	Tere Naam Japdi Phira ( Remix)
2013	Murder 3	Teri Jhuki Nazar
2013	Dhoom 3	Kamli
2013	Dhoom 3	Dhoom (Tap Dance)
2013	Dhoom 3	Dhoom Machale Dhoom (Title)
2013	Dhoom 3	Malang malang
2014	Gunday	Asaalam-E-Ishqum
2014	Gunday	Tune Maari Entriyaan
2014	Gunday	Jashn-E-Ishq
2014	Youngistaan	Youngistaan Anthem
2015	Tevar	Mai Nahin Jaana Pardes
2015	Tevar	Radha Nachegi
2015	Dolly Ki Doli	Babaji Ka Thullu
2015	Roy	Sooraj Dooba Hai
2015	Dum Laga Ke Haisha	Dum Lagaake Haisha (Title)
2015	Hunterrr	Background score
2015	Bajrangi Bhaijaan	Tu Chahiye
2015	Phantom	Afghan Jalebi (Dumbek Version)
2015	Bajirao Mastani	Ab Tohe Jaane Na Doongi
2015	Hate Story 3	Wajah Tum Ho
2015	Hate Story 3	Love to Hate You Baby
2016	Airlift	De Di
2016	Kapoor And Sons	Buddhu Sa Mann
2016	Ki and Ka	High Heels
2016	Sarbjit	Dard
2016	Sarbjit	Salaamat
2016	Veerappan	Moochi Re
2016	Baar Baar Dekho	Sau Aasmaan
2016	Parched	Mai Re Mai
2016	Tum Bin 2	Jaeger Bomb
2016	Tum Bin 2	Teri Fariyaad
2016	Tum Bin 2	Tum Bin
2016	Tum Bin 2	Nachna Aunda Nahin
2016	Wajah Tum Ho	Dil Ke Pass
2016	Wajah Tum Ho	Dil Ke Pass(Unplugged)
2016	Wajah Tum Ho	Dil Mein Choopa Lunga
2017	Kaabil	Kaabil (Title Track)
2017	Kaabil	Mon Amour
2017	Commando 2	Hare Krishna Hare Ram
2017	Naam Shabana	Zubi Zubi
2017	Noor	Gulabi 2.0
2017	Hindi Medium	Oh Ho Ho Ho(Remix)
2017	Raabta	Darasal
2017	Baadshaho	Piya More
2017	Baadshaho	Socha hai (ove Version)?
2017	Mubarakan	Mubarakan (Title Track Remix)
2017	Chef	Tere Mere
2017	Golmaal Again	Hum Nahin Sudharenge
2017	Golmaal Again	Neend Churai Meri
2017	Ranchi Diaries	Thoda Aur
2018	Hate Story 4	Badnaamiyan
2024	Madgaon Express	"Baby Bring It On"

== As music director ==
=== Singles ===
Year	Song	Singer(s)	Notes
2016	Pyaar Manga Hai	Armaan Malik, Neeti Mohan	Single
2016	Halka Halka Suroor (Remake)	Rahat Fateh Ali Khan	Single
2016	T-Series Acoustic (2016)	T-Series's Singers	Compilation
2017	Kabhi Yaadon Mein (Remake)	Palak Muchhal, Arijit Singh	Original by Saptarishi
2017	T-Series Mixtape	T-Series's Singers	Compilation
2017	T-Series Mixtape Punjabi	T-Series's Singers	Compilation
2018	T-Series Acoustic (2018)	T-Series's Singers	Compilation
2019	T-Series Mixtape Season 2	T-Series's Singers	Compilation
2020	Bepata	Abhijit Vaghani	Music by Anjana Ankur Singh
2021	T-Series Mixtape Rewind Season 3	T-Series's Singers	Compilation
2022	Hona Mere	Dhvani Bhanushali	Along with Dhvani Bhanushali

=== Film ===
Year	Film	Song	Singers	Notes
2010	Tere Bin Laden			
2016	Wajah Tum Ho	Pal Pal Dil Ke Paas (Remake)	Tulsi Kumar, Arijit Singh, Neuman Pinto	Remake of "Pal Pal Dil Ke Pass" from Blackmail (1973)
2016	Wajah Tum Ho	Pal Pal Dil Ke Paas (Unplugged)	Armaan Malik, Shmaita Bhatkat	Remake of "Pal Pal Dil Ke Pass" from Blackmail (1973)
2016	Wajah Tum Ho	Pal Pal Dil Ke Paas (Indian Version)	Arijit Singh, Tulsi Kumar	Remake of "Pal Pal Dil Ke Pass" from Blackmail (1973)
2016	Wajah Tum Ho	Pal Pal Dil Ke Paas (Indian Versio by Arijit)	Arijit Singh	Remake of "Pal Pal Dil Ke Pass" from Blackmail (1973)
2017	Hindi Medium	Oh Ho Ho Ho (Remake)	Sukhbir, Ikka	Remake of "Oh Ho Ho"; Along with Sukhbir
2019	Amavas	"Finito"	Jubin Nautiyal, Sukriti Kakar	
2019	Luka Chuppi	"Duniya (Remake)"	Akhil, Dhvani Bhanushali	Remake of "Khab" sung by Akhil
2023	Shehzada	"Character Dheela 2.0 (Remake)"	Neeraj Shridhar, Style Bai	Remake of "Character Dheela" from Ready (2011); Along with Pritam
2023	Gumraah	"Gumraah - Title Track"	Sachet Tandon, Parampara Tandon	
2023	Yaariyan 2			

=== For background score ===
Year	Film
2005	Chocolate
2006	Zinda
2007	Dhamaal
2007	Goal
2007	Jab We Met
2008	Sunday
2008	A Wednesday!
2008	Golmaal Returns
2009	Billu
2009	8 x 10 Tasveer
2009	Ek: The Power of One
2009	Love Aaj Kal
2009	Wanted
2009	London Dreams
2009	Ajab Prem Ki Ghazab Kahani
2009	Kurbaan
2009	Rocket Singh: Salesman of the Year
2010	Pyaar Impossible!
2010	Teen Patti
2010	Kites
2010	I Hate Luv Storys
2010	Action Replayy
2010	Band Baaja Baaraat
2010	Break Ke Baad
2011	Pyaar Ka Punchnama
2011	Ra.One
2011	Aazaan
2012	Jodi Breakers
2012	London, Paris, New York
2012	Heroine
2013	Akaash Vani
2013	Race 2
2013	Kai Po Che!
2013	Yeh Jawaani Hai Deewani
2013	Satyagraha
2013	Krrish 3
2014	Bhoothnath Returns
2014	Chaarfutiya Chhokare
2015	MSG: The Messenger
2015	Hunterrr
2015	Brothers
2016	Fan
2019	The Accidental Prime Minister

== Music influences ==
Vaghani is inspired by works of notable Indian musicians like RD Burman, Bappi Lahiri and AR Rahman.

== Accolades ==
Vaghani was nominated for the Best Music Arranger and Programmer award by Global Indian Music Academy Awards for his Music arrangements and programming for the Bollywood film Ra.One in 2012.
