= Run-Up Records =

Canadian Independent record label

Run Up Records
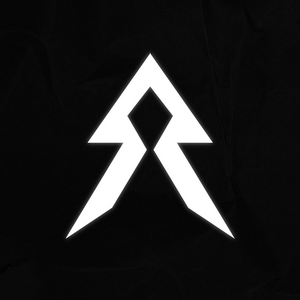
- The Official Logo of Run-Up Records.
- Founded: 2019
- Founder: AP Dhillon; Gurinder Gill; Shinda Kahlon; Gminxr; Herman Atwal; Kevin Buttar
- Status: Active
- Distributors: Mass Appeal Records; Republic Records
- Genre: Hip-hop; trap; R&B; pop
- Country of origin: Canada
- Location: British Columbia, Canada

Run-Up Records is a Canadian independent record label, founded in 2019 by Hip-hop collective composed of musicians AP Dhillon, Gurinder Gill, Shinda Kahlon, Gminxr with manager Herman Atwal and Kevin Buttar. The trio split in 2021 and AP Dhillon and Gurinder Gill have gone on to release singles and a few albums between them as of 2025. Run-Up Records produced music with AP Dhillon and Shinda Kahlon up until 2023.

== Artists ==
- AP Dhillon
- Gurinder Gill
- Shinda Kahlon
- Gminxr (in-house producer)
- Money Musik

== Album discography ==
=== Studio albums ===
Artist(s)	Title	Album details	Peak chart positions	
Artist(s)	Title	Album details	CAN	NZ
AP Dhillon, Gurinder Gill & Money Musik	Not by Chance	Released: 23 December 2020; Format: Digital download, streaming	63	—
Gurinder Gill	Hard Choices	Released: 9 June 2023; Music: Gminxr, Money Musik; Format: Digital download, streaming	—	34
AP Dhillon	The Brownprint (released with Republic)	Released: August 30, 2024; Formats: Digital download, streaming	26	—

=== Extended plays ===
Artist(s)	Title	Details	Peak chart positions
Artist(s)	Title	Details	CAN
AP Dhillon, Gurinder Gill, Shinda Kahlon & Gminxr	Hidden Gems	Released: 21 November 2021; Format: Digital download, streaming	—
AP Dhillon	Two Hearts Never Break the Same	Released: 7 October 2022; Format: Digital download, streaming	53
AP Dhillon	First of a Kind (released with Mass Appeal India)	Released: September 8, 2023; Formats: Digital download, streaming	

== Singles discography ==
List of singles with peak chart positions
Title	Year	Peak chart positions						Music	Album
Title	Year	CAN	NZ Hot	IND	UK Asian	UK Punjabi	WW	Music	Album
"Fake" (AP Dhillon)	2019	—	—	—	—	—		Gminxr	Non-album singles
Faraar (Gurinder Gill, Shinda Kahlon & AP Dhillon)	2019	—	—	—	—	11		AP Dhillon	Non-album singles
"Top Boy" (AP Dhillon)	2019	—	—	—	—	—		AP Dhillon	Non-album singles
"Arrogant" (AP Dhillon, Shinda Kahlon & Gminxr)	2020	—	—	—	—	—		Gminxr	Non-album singles
"Feels" (AP Dhillon & Gurinder Gill)	2020	—	—	—	—	—		Gminxr	Non-album singles
"Most Wanted" (Gurinder Gill)	2020	—	—	—	—	—		Gminxr	Non-album singles
"Hustlin'" (Gminxr, a4 & AP Dhillon)	2020	—	—	—	—	—		Gminxr	Non-album singles
"Don't Test" (Gurinder Gill)	2020	—	—	—	—	—		Gminxr	Non-album singles
"Deadly" (AP Dhillon)	2020	—	—	—	11	4		Gminxr	Non-album singles
"Kirsaan" (AP Dhillon)	2020	—	—	—	—	—		Gminxr & S-Kay	Non-album singles
"Droptop" (AP Dhillon)	2020	—	—	—	28	8		Gminxr	Non-album singles
"Excuses" (AP Dhillon with Intense & Gurinder Gill)	2020	—	—	4	3	1		Intense	Non-album singles
"Free Smoke" (AP Dhillon and Gurinder Gill)	2020	—	—	—	—	—		Manu	Non-album singles
"Brown Munde" (AP Dhillon, Gminxr, Gurinder Gill & Shinda Kahlon)	2020	—	—	—	1	1		Gminxr	Non-album singles
"Toxic" (AP Dhillon and Intense)	2020	—	—	—	3	3		Intense	Non-album singles
"Foreigns" (AP Dhillon and Gurinder Gill)	2020	—	—	—	2	6		Money Musik	Not by Chance
"Saada Pyaar" (AP Dhillon)	2020	—	20	—	1	2		Money Musik	Not by Chance
"Fate" (AP Dhillon, Gurinder Gill and Shinda Kahlon)	2020	—	33	—	—	5		Money Musik	Not by Chance
"Drip" (AP Dhillon, Gurinder Gill, Money Musik & Duvy)	2020	—	—	—	—	17		Money Musik	Not by Chance
"Takeover" (AP Dhillon, Gurinder Gill, Money Musik and AR Paisley)	2020	—	28	—	—	10		Money Musik	Not by Chance
"Chances" (AP Dhillon and Gurinder Gill)	2020	—	29	—	—	4		Money Musik	Not by Chance
"Goat" (AP Dhillon and Gurinder Gill)	2020	—	21	—	—	3		Money Musik	Not by Chance
"Insane" (AP Dhillon, Shinda Kahlon and Gurinder Gill)	2021	—	10	—	1	—		Gminxr & Pvli	Non-album singles
"Ma Belle" (AP Dhillon and Amari)	2021	—	27	—	3	3		AP Dhillon	Non-album singles
"Against All Odds" (AP Dhillon, Shinda Kahlon and Gurinder Gill)	2021	—	—	—	—	7		Gminxr	Hidden Gems
"Majhe Aale" (AP Dhillon, Shinda Kahlon and Gurinder Gill)	2021	—	—	—	32	6		Gminxr	Hidden Gems
"Spaceship" (AP Dhillon & Shinda Kahlon)	2021	—	—	—	8	5		Gminxr	Hidden Gems
"Tere Te" (AP Dhillon and Gurinder Gill)	2021	—	30	—	3	3		AP Dhillon	Hidden Gems
"Desires" (AP Dhillon and Gurinder Gill)	2021	—	22	—	2	2		AP Dhillon	Hidden Gems
"War" (AP Dhillon and Gurinder Gill)	2021	—	—	—	—	8		Manu	Hidden Gems
"Summer High" (AP Dhillon)	2022	79	15	13	1	1		Pvli & Sach	Two Hearts Never Break the Same
"Dil Nu" (AP Dhillon & Shinda Kahlon)	2022	—	—	—	16	7		Rebbel	Two Hearts Never Break the Same
"All Night" (AP Dhillon & Shinda Kahlon)	2022	—	—	—	7	5		Rebbel	Two Hearts Never Break the Same
"Hills" (AP Dhillon)	2022	—	—	—	—	6		Chris Beats	Two Hearts Never Break the Same
"Wo Noor" (AP Dhillon)	2022	—	39	—	4	3		Pvli	Two Hearts Never Break the Same
"Final Thoughts" (AP Dhillon and Shinda Kahlon)	2022	—	—	—	—	9		Gminxr & Osrs	Two Hearts Never Break the Same
"Wake Up" (Gurinder Gill)	2023		20	—	6	5		Manu/Muddy	Hard Choices
"Network" (Gurinder Gill)	2023		29	—	10	6		Sach	Hard Choices
"Breathe" (Gurinder Gill)	2023		36	—	9	7		Money Musik & Manu	Hard Choices
"4 Bakyian" (Gurinder Gill)	2023		37	—	—	12		Money Musik	Hard Choices
Forever (Gurinder Gill)	2023		—	—	—	13		Gminxr & Deep	Hard Choices
Lonestar (Gurinder Gill)	2023		—	—	—	16		Gminxr	Hard Choices
"Moments" (Gurinder Gill)	2023		—	—	—	17		Gminxr	Hard Choices
"True Stories" (AP Dhillon and Shinda Kahlon)	2023	81	14	—	4	2	—	Gore Ocean	Non-album singles
"Sleepless" (AP Dhillon)	2023	—	35	—	5	3	—	Castello Beats	Non-album singles
"With You" (AP Dhillon)	2023	41	14	2	1	1	137	Rebbel	First of a Kind (from Amazon Original Series)
"Lifestyle" (AP Dhillon and Shinda Kahlon)	2023	—	39	—	—	11	—	Yogic Beats	First of a Kind (from Amazon Original Series)
"Scars" (AP Dhillon)	2023	—	36	—	20	9	—	Fantom	First of a Kind (from Amazon Original Series)
