= Amavas =

2019 Indian horror film

- Theatrical release poster
- Directed by: Bhushan Patel
- Written by: Aparna Nadig (Dialogue)
- Screenplay by: Tanya Pathak
- Story by: Jody Medland
- Produced by: Raina Joshi; Dipen Amin
- Starring: Sachiin Joshi; Nargis Fakhri; Mona Singh; Vivan Bhatena
- Cinematography: Amarjeet Singh
- Edited by: Deven Murdeshwar
- Music by: Score: Amar Mohile; Songs: Sanjeev–Darshan; Ankit Tiwari; Abhijit Vaghani; Asad Khan
- Production companies: Viking Media and Entertainment
- Distributed by: Blue Sapphire Films UK; Weeping Grave Productions; AA Films; Panorama Studios
- Release date: 8 February 2019
- Running time: 132 mins
- Country: India
- Language: Hindi
- Box office: est. ₹36 million

Amavas (transl. New Moon Night) is a 2019 Indian Hindi-language horror thriller film directed by Bhushan Patel. Presented by Viiking Media Entertainment, the film stars Sachiin Joshi, Nargis Fakhri and Mona Singh. The movie was released on 8 February 2019.

== Plot ==
The story is about Karan who is possessed by the spirit of his friend Sameer, who gets murdered. After that, Maya also gets murdered by Sameer's spirit which is in the body of Karan. Sameer's spirit also kills Gotti, Shibani, Ruhi (Maya's sister) and also tries to kill Ahana. But Karan saves her by killing himself in the burning grave of Sameer. Karan has an injury mark on his chest given by Sameer during his death, his (spirit) only source to survive in the body of Karan. But in the end scene, it seems that there was also same kind of injury mark in the hand of Ahana. So the spirit then also exists in Ahana with the mark of the ghost Movie ends promising a sequel.

== Cast ==
- Sachiin Joshi as Karan Ajmera
- Nargis Fakhri as Ahana
- Vivan Bhatena as Sameer, the ghost
- Mona Singh as Dr. Shibani Roy, psychiatrist
- Ali Asgar as Gotti, servant and butler
- Navneet Kaur Dhillon as Maya
- Sabina Chema as Ruhi (Maya's Sister)
- Monisha Haseen
- Tara Devani
- David Broughton as Doctor

== Soundtrack ==
Amavas

Soundtrack album by Sanjeev–Darshan, Ankit Tiwari, Abhijit Vaghani and Asad Khan
- Released: 1 February 2019
- Recorded: 2018
- Genre: Feature Film Soundtrack
- Length: 17:44
- Language: Hindi
- Label: T-Series

Sanjeev–Darshan chronology
Bhaiaji Superhit (2018)	Amavas (2019)

Ankit Tiwari chronology
Kaashi in Search of Ganga (2018)	Amavas (2019)	Romeo Akbar Walter (2019)

Abhijit Vaghani chronology
Wajah Tum Ho (2016)	Amavas (2019)	Luka Chuppi (2019)

The film's soundtrack was composed by Sanjeev–Darshan, Ankit Tiwari, Abhijit Vaghani and Asad Khan, with lyrics written by Sandeep Nath, Junaid Wasi, Anurag Bhomia, Kunaal Verma and Ikka. The first song was titled "Jab Se Mera Dil" and released on 11 December 2018. The album is presented by T-Series.

Track listing
No.	Title	Lyrics	Music	Singer(s)	Length
1.	"Jab Se Mera Dil"	Sandeep Nath	Sanjeev–Darshan	Armaan Malik, Palak Muchhal	3:24
2.	"Finito"	Kunaal Verma, Ikka	Abhijit Vaghani	Jubin Nautiyal, Sukriti Kakar, Ikka	3:17
3.	"Dhadkan"	Sandeep Nath	Sanjeev–Darshan	Jubin Nautiyal, Palak Muchhal	3:37
4.	"Bheege Bheege"	Anurag Bhomia	Ankit Tiwari	Ankit Tiwari, Sunidhi Chauhan	3:40
5.	"Zikr"	Junaid Wasi	Asad Khan	Armaan Malik	3:46
Total length:					17:44

== Release ==
On 5 January 2019, a new poster was unveiled, which revealed that the release date was postponed to 8 February that year.

== Reception ==
=== Critical response ===
Amavas received mixed reviews from critics. Reza Noorani of The Times of India rates the film one and half stars out of five and writes, "As far as the horror is concerned, there is nothing to worry about because the ghost is extremely predictable even when it tries to surprise you. While the effects are slick and the ghosts match up to international standards, they cannot save this film from turning into a painful two-hour-long watch". In contrast, Subhash K. Jha of News18 gave it three stars out of five and opined: "Death is indeed a "grave" matter in Hindi horror, what with the graveyard being a favourite haunt of horror. Amavas doesn't visit any graveyard but a grave plays an important part in the rites of exorcism. The film presses all the right buttons, ticks all the boxes". Kunal Guha of Mumbai Mirror, however, rated the film one star out of five, and felt it "reduces horror to hilarity".

=== Box office ===
The film earned ₹0.75 crore nett in India on its opening day. Amavas has collected ₹30 million nett pan India in its opening week.
