= Tegi Pannu =

Australian singer and songwriter

- Born: Amritsar, Punjab, India
- Origin: Sydney, Australia
- Genres: Pop; bhangra; hip-hop; R&B
- Occupations: Singer; rapper; songwriter
- Instrument: Vocals
- Years active: 2019-present
- Labels: Collab Creations; Tegi Pannu
- Member of: Collab Creations
- Members: Manni Sandhu; Navaan Sandhu; Sukha

Tegbir Singh Pannu, known professionally as Tegi Pannu, is an Indian-Australian singer, rapper and songwriter who works predominantly in Punjabi music. He became known with his single "Into You" with Manni Sandhu. His numerous singles charted on the UK Asian Music Chart and the UK Punjabi Charts by Official Charts Company.

== Early life ==
Born to a Jat Sikh family in Amritsar, Punjab, India in 1996, Pannu is based out of Sydney, New South Wales, Australia.

== Career ==
In 2019, Tegi Pannu pursued his career with Manni Sandhu releasing his single 'Into You' followed by Fully Loaded and Schedule.

In 2022, Pannu released his debut EP ‘Disturbing The Peace'. The EP produced singles ‘One Question' and 'Hold You Down' which charted on UK Asian Music Chart.

He released his second EP 'Switching Lanes' with Sukha in 2023. EP contains singles 'Switchin’ Lanes’ and ‘On Sight’ are charted on UK Asian Music Charts.

== Discography ==
=== Studio albums ===
Title	Details
Disturbing The Peace	Released: November 18, 2022; Music: Manni Sandhu, Stunah Beatz, SOE; Label: Collab Creations; Format: Digital download, streaming

=== Extended plays ===
Title	Details
Switchin’ Lanes (with Sukha)	Released: May 26, 2023; Music: Manni Sandhu, ProdGK; Label: Collab Creations; Format: Digital download, streaming
Broken Silence	Released: April 5, 2024; Music: Manni Sandhu, Gminxr; Label: Collab Creations; Format: Digital download, streaming

=== Singles ===
Title	Year	Music	Peak chart position		Record Label	Album
Title	Year	Music	UK Asian	UK Punjabi	Record Label	Album
Akh Teri (with Pav Dharia)	2019	San B	—	—	47 Studios	non-album singles
Deevana	2019	Pav Dharia	—	—	47 Studios	non-album singles
Why Why (with Pavvan)	2020	Manav Sangha	—	—	47 Studios	non-album singles
Into You (with Manni Sandhu)	2021	Manni Sandhu	14	10	Collab Creations	non-album singles
Schedule (with Manni Sandhu)	2021	Manni Sandhu	4	1	Collab Creations	non-album singles
Shinin’ (with Manni Sandhu)	2021	Manni Sandhu	14	9	Collab Creations	non-album singles
Fully Loaded (with Manni Sandhu)	2021	Manni Sandhu	11	3	Collab Creations	non-album singles
Untouchable (with Manni Sandhu)	2022	Manni Sandhu	7	5	Collab Creations	non-album singles
Roll Deep (with Manni Sandhu)	2022	Manni Sandhu	6	3	Collab Creations	non-album singles
One Question (with Manni Sandhu)	2022	Manni Sandhu	8	7	Collab Creations	Disturbing The Peace EP
Mood Swing (with Manni Sandhu)	2022	Manni Sandhu	14	12	Collab Creations	Disturbing The Peace EP
Hold You Down (with Manni Sandhu featuring JJ Esko)	2022	Manni Sandhu	15	13	Collab Creations	Disturbing The Peace EP
Meant To Be (with Money Musik)	2023	Money Musik	—	—	Tegi Pannu	non-album single
On Sight (with Sukha)	2023	ProdGK	20	15	Collab Creations	Switchin’ Lanes
Links (with Sukha)	2023	ProdGK	—	20	Collab Creations	Switchin’ Lanes
Obsession (with Sukha)	2023	Manni Sandhu	17	11	Collab Creations	Switchin’ Lanes
Tere Bina (with Sukha)	2023	Manni Sandhu	22	17	Collab Creations	Switchin’ Lanes
Making Moves (with Sukha)	2023	Manni Sandhu	—	—	Collab Creations	Switchin’ Lanes
Switchin’ Lanes (with Sukha)	2023	Manni Sandhu	14	9	Collab Creations	Switchin’ Lanes
Forever	2024	Manni Sandhu				Broken Silence
