= Levels (Sidhu Moose Wala song) =

2022 Song by Sidhu Moose Wala and Sunny Malton

Single by Sidhu Moose Wala featuring Sunny Malton
- Language: Punjabi and English
- Released: 25 May 2022
- Genre: Hip hop; trap
- Length: 3:52
- Label: Sidhu Moose Wala
- Songwriters: Sidhu Moose Wala; Sunny Malton
- Producer: The Kidd

Sidhu Moose Wala featuring Sunny Malton singles chronology
| "The Last Ride" (2022) | "Levels" (2022) | "SYL" (2022) |

Music video
- "Levels" on YouTube

"Levels" is a song by Indian rapper-singer Sidhu Moose Wala featuring Canadian rapper Sunny Malton. The song was written by him and was released four days before his assassination on 29 May 2022 in the village named Jawarkhe near his village Moosa.

== Lyrical content ==
In the song, Sidhu speaks about his personal feuds with singers who he made famous such as Prem Dhillon, Nseeb and his old rivals like Karan Aujla and Babbu Maan.

== Commercial performance ==
It received over 200,000,000 views on Youtube.

== Credits and personnel ==
- Sidhu Moose Wala, Sunny Malton – songwriting
- The Kidd – production
- Nav Dhimman – mixing and engineering
- Vishal Chaudhary – artwork

== Charts ==
Weekly chart performance for "Levels"
| Chart (2022) | Peak position |
|---|---|
| Australia (ARIA) | 2 |
| Canada (Canadian Hot 100) | 32 |
| Global Excl. US (Billboard) | 195 |
| India (Billboard) | 4 |
| New Zealand Hot Singles (RMNZ) | 15 |
| UK Asian (Official Charts Company) | 1 |

== Certifications ==
Certifications for "Levels"
| Region | Certification | Certified units/sales |
|---|---|---|
| Canada (Music Canada) | Platinum | 80,000^{‡} |
^{‡} Sales+streaming figures based on certification alone.
