= Luka Chuppi =

2019 Indian film by Laxman Utekar

- Theatrical release poster
- Directed by: Laxman Utekar
- Written by: Rohan Shankar
- Produced by: Dinesh Vijan
- Starring: Kartik Aaryan; Kriti Sanon
- Cinematography: Milind Jog
- Edited by: Manish Pradhan
- Music by: Songs: Tanishk Bagchi; White Noise; Abhijit Vaghani; Score: Ketan Sodha
- Production companies: Jio Studios; Maddock Films
- Distributed by: AA Films
- Release date: 1 March 2019
- Running time: 126 minutes
- Country: India
- Language: Hindi
- Budget: ₹25 crore
- Box office: est. ₹128.6 crore

Luka Chuppi (transl. Hide and Seek) is a 2019 Indian Hindi-language romantic comedy film directed by Laxman Utekar and produced by Dinesh Vijan's Maddock Films. The film stars Kartik Aaryan and Kriti Sanon with Aparshakti Khurana, Pankaj Tripathi, Vinay Pathak and Alka Amin playing supporting roles. Set in Mathura, it is about a television reporter who cohabits with his headstrong intern and chaos ensues when their traditional families assume them to be married to each other.

The film was released on 1 March 2019 to a positive critical reception. It became a major financial success at the box office, grossing ₹128.60 crore (US$13 million) worldwide.

== Plot ==
Vishnu Trivedi, a failing politician in the small town of Mathura, campaigns to ban live-in relationships, seeing them as a disgrace to the Indian conservative culture. At the same time, his party begins to lead an all-out campaign against film star Nazeem Khan, who is allegedly in a live-in relationship with his girlfriend, exactly the cause behind his grudge against live-in relationships.

Vishnu's daughter Rashmi takes up an internship at a local news channel, and starts working with the channel's star reporter Vinod "Guddu" Shukla and his best friend, cameraman Abbas Sheikh. Guddu and Rashmi fall in love and Guddu proposes to her. Not ready for marriage, she suggests a live-in relationship, but he, being more traditional and somewhat scared of Vishnu, disagrees. As a compromise, Abbas suggests trying a live-in relationship during their 20-day business trip to Gwalior. The couple agrees.

They rent an apartment in a conservative area by pretending to be a married couple. Eventually, they get closer and consummate their relationship. Their nosy neighbour, Mrs. Srivastava, sees them during one such act and becomes suspicious of their marital status. To further complicate matters, they mix-up their answers when asked about their wedding date. She plans to gather the neighbourhood to oust the couple the next morning, but Guddu and Rashmi come up with fake photographs and wedding mementos overnight, leaving her plans adrift. At the end of twenty days, he reaffirms his love and she accepts his marriage proposal. Before they can leave Gwalior, Guddu's relative Babulal sees the two together, follows them, sees the wedding pictures, and assumes that they eloped.

The next morning, Babulal brings Guddu's entire family to their house and they chastise him for eloping. Guddu and Rashmi, realising that the family would willingly accept a marriage but not a cohabitation, do not admit the truth. All of them go back to Mathura to meet Rashmi's family and tell them about it. Vishnu, however, is happy to hear that his daughter decided to get married instead of cohabiting. He even details the deadly consequences, should they have cohabited instead. Scared, the couple fails to admit the truth.

Although they begin living like a married couple, they resent the fact that they are not legally married. They make multiple attempts to get married in secret, but are interrupted every time; in a last-ditch attempt, they try to get married in a mass marriage event. Vishnu, however, being the chief guest, catches them red-handed. Exasperated, they admit that they had been cohabiting.

Once his family, too, catches up, Guddu reveals to Vishnu that the main reason for his loss in elections is his reluctance to change; since the majority of the voting group is the young generation, which believes in modernity, opposing the youth's methods would equal a lack of support from them. He successfully convinces Vishnu to stop opposing live-in relationships and finally marries Rashmi with his blessings.

The story ends with Guddu and Rashmi covering a rally led by Vishnu, who is shown to have joined hands with Nazeem for his election campaign.

== Cast ==
- Kartik Aaryan as Vinod "Guddu" Shukla
- Kriti Sanon as Rashmi Trivedi Shukla, a news reporter, and later Guddu's wife
- Aparshakti Khurana as Abbas Sheikh, Guddu's best friend
- Pankaj Tripathi as Babbal "Babulal" Singh, Guddu's sister-in-law's brother
- Vinay Pathak as Vishnu Trivedi, Rashmi's father
- Atul Srivastava as Badri Prasad Shukla, Guddu's father
- Alka Amin as Shakuntala Shukla, Guddu's mother
- Himanshu Kohli as Vikas Shukla, Guddu's brother
- Vishwanath Chatterjee as Varun Shukla, Guddu's brother
- Samarth Chauhan as Chikoo Shukla, Guddu’s nephew
- Neha Saraf as Janki Shukla, Guddu's sister-in-law
- Ajeet Singh as Shrikant Trivedi, Rashmi's paternal cousin
- Vimi Mehta as Savitri Singh Trivedi, Rashmi's mother
- Arun Singh Kushwaha as Chotu
- Sapna Sand as Pooja Srivastava
- Abhinav Shukla as Nazeem Khan
- Nabil Singh as wedding Pandit

== Production ==
Principal photography for the film began in Gwalior on 1 August 2018 and was completed in Mathura in September 2018. The film was released on 1 March 2019. Bollywood Hungama put the film's estimated budget at ₹25 crore, which included print and advertising costs. (Note: A film's budget typically refers to the straight cost of making the film, not the cost of promoting it with print and advertising, etc.) Box Office India estimated the film's budget as ₹34 crore.

== Release ==
The first poster of the film was released on 23 January 2019. Producer Dinesh Vijan refused to release the film in Pakistan in the aftermath of the 2019 Pulwama Attack. It released theatrically worldwide on 1 March 2019.

=== Home media ===
Luka Chuppi became available as video on demand on JioCinema and Netflix in June 2019.

== Music ==
Luka Chuppi

Soundtrack album by Tanishk Bagchi, White Noise and Abhijit Vaghani
- Released: 22 February 2019
- Recorded: 2018
- Genre: Feature film soundtrack
- Length: 15:26
- Language: Hindi
- Label: T-Series
External audio
- Official Audio Jukebox on YouTube

Tanishk Bagchi chronology
Fraud Saiyaan (2019)	Luka Chuppi (2019)	Kesari (2019)

Abhijit Vaghani chronology
Amavas (2019)	Luka Chuppi (2019)

White Noise chronology
Veere Di Wedding (2018)	Luka Chuppi (2019)

The music of the film was composed by Tanishk Bagchi, Abhijit Vaghani and White Noise. All the songs of the film are remakes of popular songs, thus making it a remix album.

- "Poster Lagwado Bazar Mein" from Aflatoon (1997) was recreated for the film as "Poster Lagwa Do".
- "Coca Cola" by Tony Kakkar was remixed for the film. Re-sung by Tony with additional vocals by Neha Kakkar, the recreated version was released as "Coca Cola Tu".
- "Photo" by Karan Sehmbi was recreated in Hindi for the film.
- "Laung Laachi" by Mannat Noor was also recreated in Hindi and was released as "Tu Laung Main Elaachi".
- "Khaab" by Akhil was another Hindi recreation and was released as "Duniyaa".

Track listing
No.	Title	Lyrics	Music	Singer(s)	Length
1.	"Poster Lagwa Do"	White Noise	White Noise	Mika Singh, Sunanda Sharma; Rap: Nikhita Gandhi	2:58
2.	"Coca Cola Tu"	Tony Kakkar, Mellow D	Tanishk Bagchi	Tony Kakkar, Neha Kakkar; Rap: Young Desi	2:59
3.	"Photo"	Nirmaan	Tanishk Bagchi	Karan Sehmbi	2:57
4.	"Tu Laung Main Elaachi"	Kunaal Vermaa	Tanishk Bagchi	Tulsi Kumar	2:50
5.	"Duniyaa"	Kunaal Vermaa	Abhijit Vaghani	Akhil, Dhvani Bhanushali	3:42
Total length:					15:26

== Reception ==
=== Critical response ===
Taran Adarsh, giving it 3.5/5 stars, tweeted a one-line review, "a situational comedy with a message... Relatable premise, clean humour, foot tapping music, loads of entertainment... Superb climax... Kartik Aaryan top notch, Kriti Sanon damn good. Recommended!"

Bollywood Hungama, appreciated the acting and comedy but found the cinematography "average" and the production design "satisfactory". They wrote "Luka Chuppi is a funny take on the modern relationships laced with dollops of situational and funny moments." Appreciating the acting, they continued "Kartik Aaryan once again is in a great form. His boyish looks work instantly but it's his performance that makes it even more endearing. Kriti Sanon has a fantastic screen presence and maintains a strong position." Filmfare wrote, "Kriti Sanon is spontaneous throughout and seems to be finding her feet in comedy, having a gala time of it all in the process. Kartik Aaryan displays wholesome charm and plays his part perfectly. Aparshakti instils the fun with minute shrugs and gestures and keeps it subtle but effective nonetheless."

Komal Nahta wrote, "Kartik Aryan does a fine job as Guddu. His acting is effortless and he is the best when he is helpless in the second half. Kriti Sanon looks very pretty and plays Rashmi ably." He gave Pankaj Tripathi "full marks" for his portrayal of Babulal." Aashu Mishra from ABP News said, "Luka Chuppi is an easy breezy and crazy drama with an underlying layer of dark satire and social statement on moral policing and communal biases in small towns. The crackling chemistry between Kartik Aryan and Kriti Sanon is bang on and looks refreshing."

=== Box office ===
Collecting ₹8.01 crore, Luka Chuppi became the fourth highest opening-day grosser of 2019 in Bollywood. Having collected ₹10.08 crore and ₹14.04 crore on its second and third days respectively, the film's opening weekend total became ₹32.13 crore, making it one of 2019's highest opening weekend collection of a Bollywood film.

As of 19 June 2019, the worldwide gross of the film is ₹128.86 crore, with domestic gross of ₹111.87 crore and overseas gross of ₹16.99 crore. Thus, the film was a huge financial success.

== Sequel ==
A sequel named Luka Chuppi 2 is set to be produced by Dinesh Vijan under Maddock Films, it may tell the story of a couple going through divorce with the families being unaware. The film was planned to go into production in 2020, but the production was delayed due to the COVID-19 pandemic.
