= AR Paisley =

- Born: Amarit Rehal; 1997 (age 28–29); Mississauga, Ontario, Canada
- Genres: Classic hip hop; Hip hop
- Occupations: Rapper; songwriter
- Instrument: Vocals
- Years active: 2010–present
- Website: arpaisley.com

AR Paisley (born Amarit Rehal in 1997) is a Canadian rapper and songwriter. Paisley began his career by releasing his debut album "Screwface" in 2017. His second album "Timeless" was released in 2019. He released his most recent album "AR Paisley Vs AR Money" in 2020. Paisley describes his musical influences as Ludacris and 50 Cent, as well as the late Tupac Shakur and Biggie Smalls. The XXL Magazine dubbed him as "a lyrical student of Jay-Z and Ludacris". His song "23 Freestyle" was listed in the top 10 Canadian songs of January 2021 by the Complex Magazine.

== Early life and background ==
Paisley was born in Mississauga, Ontario, on 1997 into an Indo-Canadian Punjabi Sikh family. He completed his schooling at Mississauga Secondary School. Paisley started rapping during high school but didn't take it too seriously at the time. Eventually, his focus on music stepped up, as he started doing rap battles around town and on radios. Paisley dropped out of high school and music became his main outlet.

== Discography ==
=== EP's and albums ===
- Pressure (2022)
- AR Paisley Vs. AR Money (2020)
- Timeless (2019)
- Screwface (2019)

== Singles discography ==
Title	Year	Music	Peak chart position					Album
Title	Year	Music	CAN	IND	NZ hot	UK Asian	WW excl. US	Album
Trudeau	2018							
Fuck Rap Part 2	2018							
Takeover (with AP Dhillon & Gurinder Gill)	2020	Money Musik			28			Not By Chance
Love Sick (with Sidhu Moose Wala)	2022	Mxrci			39			No Name
Shot Collar (with Tegi Pannu)	2022	Manni Sandhu						Disturbing The Peace
Moose World (with Sunny Malton)	2023							
Go To Sleep (with Sukha)	2023	ProdGK						
Some Of Us (with KR$NA)	2023	JpBeatz						Far From Over
Immortal (with Wazir Patar)	2023	Wazir Patar						Street Knowledge
What’s Beef (with Channi Nattan featuring Inderpal Moga)	2023	Jay Trak						
Drippy (with Sidhu Moose Wala)	2024	Mxrci	9	4	11	1	152	

- "Still Around" April 17, 2021 (Spotify exclusive)
- "Wayne Gretzky" March 26, 2021
- "Lemon Pepper Freestyle" March 11, 2021
- "Streets" January 29, 2021
- "23 Freestyle" January 7, 2021
- "Still Grateful" November 29, 2020
- "Backdoor" 2020
- "Gold Soul" March 12, 2020
- "Rain Dance" February 27, 2020
- "Price Gone Up (feat. 6ixbuzz, Bvlly, AR Paisley, 3MFrench)" February 12, 2020
- "Elegant" July 9, 2019
- "No Deal Freestyle" May 3, 2019
- "Dreams" April 8, 2019
- "Run it Up- Ft. JAY FLACO" 2019
- "Doze Off" February 13, 2019
- "Stick Up – Ft. Byg Byrd" January 3, 2018
- "Maison Margiela" December 12, 2018
- "Unity Freestyle" November 23, 2018
- "Made Men – Ft. Jay Cee" November 16, 2018
- "Lavish" November 4, 2018
- "Icy" November 4, 2018
- "Paisley" September 24, 2018
- "Bada Bing" 2018
- "Beat the Odds" June 27, 2018
- "Popovich" March 6, 2017
- "Money Talk Freestyle" March 6, 2017
