= Mulianwali =

- Village
- Location within Punjab Location within India
- Coordinates: 31.830°N 75.169°E
- Country: India
- State: Punjab
- District: Gurdaspur
- Tehsil: Batala
- Region: Majha

Government
  - Type: Panchayat raj
  - Body: Gram panchayat

Area
  - Total: 211 ha (520 acres)

Population (2011)
  - Total: 2,522; 1,335/1,187 ♂/♀
  - Scheduled Castes: 1,571; 844/727 ♂/♀
  - Total Households: 496

Languages
  - Official: Punjabi
- Time zone: UTC+5:30 (IST)
- Telephone: 01871
- ISO 3166 code: IN-PB
- Vehicle registration: PB-18
- Website: gurdaspur.nic.in

Mulianwali is a village in Batala in Gurdaspur district of Punjab State, India. It is located 5 kilometres (3.1 mi) from sub district headquarter, 40 kilometres (25 mi) from district headquarter and 3 kilometres (1.9 mi) from Sri Hargobindpur. The village is administrated by Sarpanch an elected representative of the village.

== Demography ==
As of 2011, the village has a total number of 496 houses and a population of 2522 of which 1335 are males while 1187 are females. According to the report published by Census India in 2011, out of the total population of the village 1571 people are from Schedule Caste and the village does not have any Schedule Tribe population so far.

== See also ==
- List of villages in India
