= Sunny Malton =

Indo-Canadian rapper-singer (born 1989)

- Born: Sandeep Singh Sidhu; November 15, 1989 (age 36); Toronto, Canada
- Origin: Malton, Mississauga, Canada
- Occupations: Rapper; singer; songwriter
- Instrument: Vocals
- Years active: 2008-present
- Labels: TPM Records & RIVIERA; Brown Boy Records (Former)
- Formerly of: Brown Boys
- Past members: Sidhu Moose Wala Byg Byrd Big Boi Deep

Sandeep Singh Sidhu (born November 15, 1989), known as Sunny Malton, is a Canadian rapper and singer of Punjabi music. He rose to mainstream with his track "Issa Jatt" with Sidhu Moose Wala. His song "Levels" with Sidhu charted at 2 on the Billboard Hot 100.

He is the co-founder of Brown Boys and TPM Records.

== Early life and education ==
Sandeep was born on November 15, 1989 into a Canadian Punjabi Sikh family from India and grew up in Malton, Mississauga. He attended Lincoln M. Alexander Secondary School, and worked at Canadian Tire before the success of his music career.

== Career ==
=== Early career ===
In 2016, Malton released a freestyle diss track called "Jus Remain Humble Doe", which sampled the beat from "Fire Squad" by J Cole, targeting Fateh, Jus Reign, Lilly Singh and Humble the Poet. One prominent line included "He fake with that beard, Rick Ross" directed at Fateh.

=== Rise to fame ===
In August 2017, Sidhu Moose Wala and Byg Byrd released "So High" which became Moosewala's most successful track and the pinnacle of his musical career. Malton can be heard at the start of the song saying "Imma Imma Brown Boy" which became an iconic catchphrase. He can also been seen throughout the music video, which was shot in Toronto. Malton's first music collaboration with Sidhu, was the song "Issa Jatt" in October 2017. In the same year, Malton featured on "Just Listen" by Sidhu Moosewala. The song managed to reach 12th in the UK Asian Charts. Malton released the track "Black on Black" in collaboration with Byg Byrd and Gurj Sidhu in 2018. Some of Malton's significant collaborations and features with Moosewala included "Just Listen" (2018), "East Side Flow" (2019), "Sidhu's Anthem" (2019), "Chosen" (2019), "B-Town" (2019), "Never Fold" (2022) and "Levels" (2022). He was also featured on Moosewala's last full length release before his death, No Name.

=== Releases after the death of Moosewala ===
Malton's first release after Moosewala's death was on November 1, 2022, called "Letter to Sidhu".

In January 2023, Malton released "Signs", where he also paid tribute to his former friend, Sidhu Moosewala.

In February 2023, Malton took part in his first public interview since the death of Moosewala. Malton had stated "he sees Moosewala in his dreams" and it took him 9 months to get over his death. In May 2023, he collaborated with singer Parmish Verma on the song "We Made It", to pay tribute to Moosewala.

In 2024, he composed Moosewala's posthumous track "410", which debuted at No. 42 on Billboard Canadian Hot 100.

== Feuds ==
=== Sikander Kahlon ===
In 2020, Sikander Kahlon dissed Malton on Twitter over the latter's feud with Sidhu Moose Wala, unfollowing him on Instagram. Sunny responded on Twitter with "The clowns don’t care about what’s right or wrong, all their hoping for is one song with Sidhu.. the shit you dreaming bout, we did in reality". Additionally, Sunny Malton leaked a bunch of screenshots of private messages him and Kahlon had exchanged prior, where Kahlon asked for a feature. This led to Kahlon releasing a full EP titled Sunny Milton filled with diss tracks directed towards Sunny Malton.

=== Sidhu Moosewala, Byg Byrd & Brown Boys ===
The initial Brown Boys feud started between Moosewala and Sunny Malton, Byg Byrd and BigBoiDeep after their release of the album Brown Boys Forever. On Instagram, Byrd and Malton said Sidhu Moosewala was not paying them and was "leaking" their songs. Moosewala responded with "I am ready to swear on anything religious. Putting my hand on my heart I am ready to say that if I have ever leaked any song of mine, I want my tongue to be held and I will stop singing."

In December 2020 and January 2021, Sunny Malton and Byg Byrd also got into a serious internet feud over ownership of Brown Boys Records. Despite being equal partners, Malton claimed his personal relationship was suffering for the last 4–5 months and that BygByrd signed artist, Tarna without his permission under alias of Brown Boys.

==== Reconciliation with Sidhu Moosewala ====
In October 2021, after resolving his previous feud with Sidhu Moosewala, Malton took to Instagram to say "In the end of all this nonsense, I learned that Sidhu is realer than BygPigeon. BygPigeon isn't a Byrd he's a BygSnake." He also posted a picture on Instagram with Sidhu Moosewala with the caption "We Back, Scary Hours... To all the fans, I ain't gonna say much other than Ik Vari Hor (One more time)".

== Personal life ==
In February 2019, Sunny Malton got engaged to his long-time girlfriend of 10 years, Parveen Chahal. They soon got married on April 25, 2020. In January 2023, Malton and Parveen announced the arrival of their newborn baby daughter.

== Discography ==
=== Extended plays ===
Title	EP details
It’s Always Sunny In California	Release Date: 28 April 2022; Label: Sunny Malton; Music: SOE, ProdGK; Format: digital download, streaming
Only Time Will Tell (with GUR3)	Release Date: 11 August 2022; Label: Sunny Malton; Music: SOE, Off Grid; Format: Music download, streaming

=== Singles discography ===
==== As lead artist ====
Track	Year	Peak chart position					Album
Track	Year	CAN	IND	NZ Hot	UK Asian	UK Punjabi	Album
"Get Em"	2008	—	—	—	—	—	
"BMF Freestyle" (with Jimmy King)	2010	—	—	—	—	—	
"We Get It" (with B. Magic & Fateh Doe)	2013	—	—	—	—	—	
"Sky Scraper" (featuring Villa)	2014	—	—	—	—	—	
"Day 1s" (with Blamo)	2015						
"Ted Dibiase (featuring Blamo)	2016						
"Goliyan" (featuring Haji Springer)	2017	—	—	—	—	—	
Issa Jatt (with Sidhu Moose Wala)	2017						
"My Own Lane"	2017	—	—	—	—	—	
"Mrs. Saga"	2017						
"TPM" (featuring Sidhu Moose Wala)	2017	—		—		—	
"No Mercy"	2018						
"Bout That Life" (featuring Gaurav)	2018		—		—	—	
"Copy Cat"	2018						
Warning Shots (with Sidhu Moose Wala)	2018						
"See This Happen" (featuring Blamo & 100 Watt)	2019	—	—	—	—	—	
Sidhu Anthem (with Sidhu Moose Wala)	2019	—	—	—	—	—	
"Brand New"	2019	—	—	—	—	—	
"Thang on Me" (with Byg Byrd and AR Paisley)	2019	—	—	—	—	—	Brown Boys Forever
"Hauli Hauli" (with Byg Byrd & Sidhu Moose Wala)	2019	—	—	—	—	—	Brown Boys Forever
"The Bad Guy" (with Byg Byrd)	2019	—	—	—	—	—	Brown Boys Forever
Patt Sutteya (with Byg Byrd & Big Boi Deep)	2019	—	—	—	—	—	Brown Boys Forever
"Think About Me" (with Byg Byrd, Big Boi Deep & AR Paisley)	2019	—	—	—	—	—	Brown Boys Forever
"Imma Imma Brown Boy" (with Byg Byrd & Big Boi Deep)	2019	—	—	—	—	—	Brown Boys Forever
Forget About It (with Sidhu Moose Wala)	2019	—	—	—	—	—	
"Tere Karke" (with Big Boi Deep)	2020	—	—	—	—	—	
"Almond Coloured" (with Big Boi Deep)	2020	—	—	—	—	—	
"Go"	2020	—	—	—	—	—	
Goat Vs Moose	2020		—		—		
"Hot Boy" (featuring Keetview$)	2021			—			
"Jattiye"	2021		—		—		
"You Know About Me"	2021			—			
Note To Self	2021			—			
Never Enough	2021		—	—	—		
Red Freestyle	2022			—			
"The 1/ The One"	2022			—			
"Black Freestyle" (featuring ProdGK)	2022			—			
DIOMO (with Jitt)	2022			—			
Fuck Em All (with Sidhu Moose Wala)	2022			—			
Never Fold (with Sidhu Moose Wala)	2022	92	22	19	3	3	No Name
Ride For Me	2022	—	—	—	—	—	It's Always Sunny In California
"Don't Worry" (featuring Preet)	2022	—	—	—	—	—	It's Always Sunny In California
"Jamma Jatt"	2022	—	—	—	—	—	It's Always Sunny In California
"Brown Baddie" (with Gur3)	2022	—	—	—	—	—	It's Always Sunny In California
"Letter to Sidhu"	2022	—	—	—	—	—	
Signs	2023	—	—	—	—	—	
Forever (featuring Gur3)	2023	—	—	—	—	—	

==== As featured artist ====
Track	Year	Peak chart position				
Track	Year	CAN	IND	NZ Hot	UK Asian	UK Punjabi
"I'm Fly" (Jimmy King featuring Sunny Malton)	2009	—	—	—	—	—
"Pictures From The Past" (Lxplicit featuring Sunny Malton)	2010	—	—	—	—	—
"On The Map" (Sikander Kahlon featuring Sunny Malton)	2014					
"Quit Playing" (Big Boi Deep featuring Sunny Malton)	2018					
"On Repeat" (Jimmy Mahal featuring Sunny Malton)	2018	—	—	—	—	—
"Knight Rider" (Jimmy Waraich featuring Sunny Malton)	2018					
"Just Listen" (Sidhu Moose Wala featuring Sunny Malton)	2018	—	—	—	12	—
"Black on Black" (Gurj Sidhu featuring Sunny Malton)	2018	—		—		—
"Jaguar" (Preet Chahal featuring Sunny Malton)	2019					
"Limits" (Big Boi Deep featuring Sunny Malton)	2019		—		—	
"Chosen" (Sidhu Moose Wala featuring Sunny Malton)	2019	—	—	—	—	—
"Homicide" (Big Boi Deep featuring Sidhu Moose Wala & Sunny Malton)	2019					
"Red Battiyan" (R Nait featuring Sunny Malton)	2019					
"Red Light" (Big Boi Deep featuring Sunny Malton)	2019	—	—	—	—	—
"B Town"(Sidhu Moose Wala featuring Sunny Malton)	2019	—	—	—	—	—
Khanda (Ranjit Bawa featuring Sunny Malton)	2019					
"Criminal" (Sunny Sohal featuring Sunny Malton)	2020	—	—	—	—	—
"Death" (Ashraf Yadam featuring Sunny Malton)	2020	—	—	—	—	—
"Walk Away" (Amar Singh featuring Sunny Malton)	2020	—	—	—	—	—
"Youngest in Charge" (Sidhu Moose Wala featuring Sunny Malton)	2021	—	—	—	—	—
"Levels"(Sidhu Moose Wala featuring Sunny Malton)	2022	32	4	15	1	2
