= No Name (EP) =

EP by Sidhu Moose Wala
- Released: 25 April 2022
- Recorded: 2021–2022
- Genre: Hip hop; R&B; gangsta rap; hardcore hip hop
- Length: 14:16
- Label: Sidhu Moose Wala
- Producer: SOE; Snappy; JayB; Mxrci

Sidhu Moose Wala chronology
Moosetape (2021)	No Name (2022)	Moose Print (2025)

No Name is the first extended play by Indian singer-rapper Sidhu Moose Wala, self-released on 25 April 2022 without prior announcement. Moose Wala also served as executive producer, with the tracks produced by SOE, Snappy, JayB, and Mxrci. It features guest appearances from Sunny Malton, AR Paisley and Mr. Capone-E, and is his final project following his death on 29 May that year.

== Background ==
Sidhu announced the EP on his Instagram on 24 April 2022 and released the whole EP the following day on all streaming platforms.

== Commercial performance ==
The EP debuted on number 73 on the Billboard Canadian Albums Chart while "Never Fold" debuted at number 97 on the Billboard Canadian Hot 100. "Never Fold" and "0 to 100" debuted on the Asian Music Chart (OCC) at number 9 and 20 respectively.

== Track listing ==
All lyrics are written by Sidhu Moose Wala.

No Name track listing
No.	Title	Music	Length
1.	"Never Fold" (featuring Sunny Malton)	SOE	3:03
2.	"Love Sick" (featuring AR Paisley)	Mxrci	3:52
3.	"Everybody Hurts"	JayB	2:53
4.	"0 to 100"	Mxrci	1:48
5.	"Bloodlust" (featuring Mr. Capone-E)	Snappy	2:39
Total length:			14:16

Sample credits

- "Love Sick" contains interpolation of "Jado Hauli Jai" written and performed by Noor Jehan.

== Personnel ==
- Sidhu Moose Wala – vocals, songwriter, executive producer
- Mr. Capone-E – featured artist
- AR Paisley – featured artist
- Sunny Malton – featured artist

=== Technical personnel ===
- Mxrci – producer
- PixlPxl – engineer
- MusicByRass – engineer
- SOE – producer
- JAYB – producer
- Snappy – producer

=== Artwork ===
- Nav Dhiman – visuals

== Charts ==
=== EP ===
Chart performance for No Name
Chart (2022)	Peak position
Canadian Albums (Billboard)	50

=== Singles ===
Chart performance for singles from No Name
Title	Chart (2022)	Peak position
"Never Fold"	Asian Music Chart (OCC)	3
"0–100"	Asian Music Chart (OCC)	12
"Everybody Hurts"	Asian Music Chart (OCC)	13
"Love Sick"	Asian Music Chart (OCC)	25
"Never Fold"	Uk Punjabi (OCC)	4
"0–100"	Uk Punjabi (OCC)	9
"Everybody Hurts"	Uk Punjabi (OCC)	10
"Bloodlust"	Uk Punjabi (OCC)	16
"Love Sick"	Uk Punjabi (OCC)	11
"Never Fold"	New Zealand Hot	19
"0 to 100"	New Zealand Hot	34
"Love Sick"	New Zealand Hot	39
"Never Fold"	Billboard India Songs	22
"Never Fold"	Canadian Hot 100	92
