= Akhil (singer) =

Indian playback singer, songwriter and music composer (born 1990)

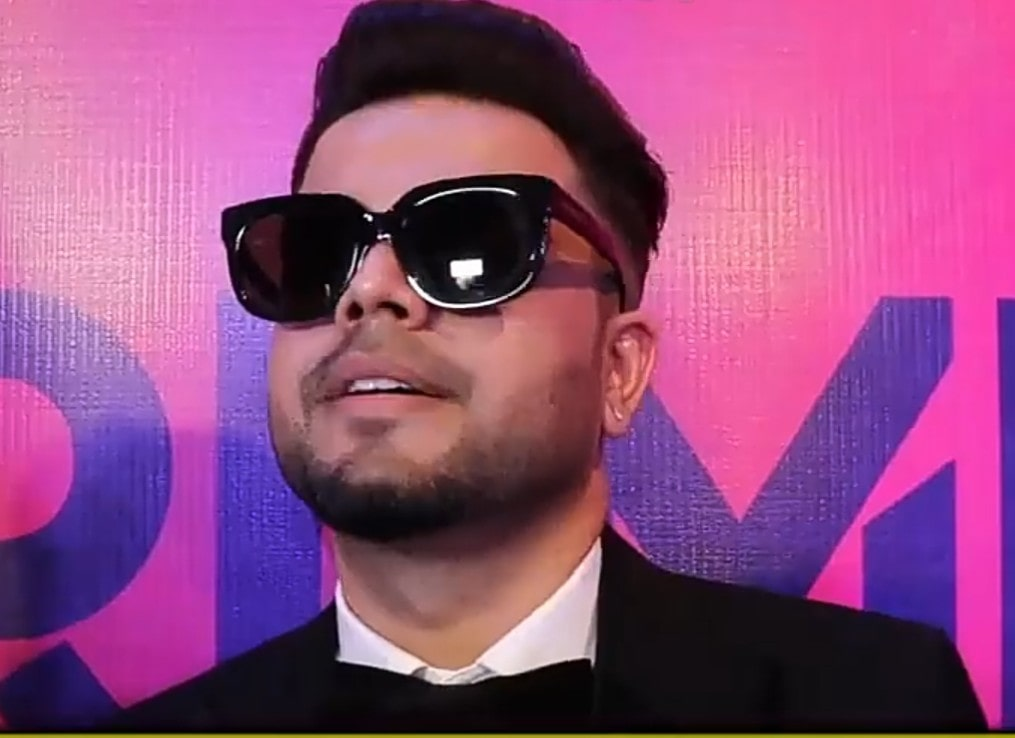
- Akhil

Background information
- Also known as: Akhil Pasreja
- Born: 2 October 1990; Jalandhar, Punjab, India
- Genres: Pop, Hip Hop, Bhangra
- Occupations: Singer; Songwriter; Music composer
- Years active: 2013—present
- Labels: T-Series; Akhil Music Official; Desi Music Factory; Speed Records; Crown Records

Akhil Pasreja, known mononymously as Akhil, is an Indian playback singer, songwriter and music performer. He made his Bollywood singing debut in Luka Chuppi (2019). He was born in Jalandhar, Punjab.

== Career ==
In February 2014, his first single "Muradaan" was released under HSR Entertainment (formerly Yellow Music). He previously sang a song titled "Pee Lain De" in 2012 though.

His Punjabi-language single "Khaab", which was released in February 2016 became popular on YouTube. In February 2019, a Hindi remake of Khaab, Duniyaa, was recorded for the film Luka Chuppi.

In June 2016, he collaborated with music composer "Manni Sandhu" for a single titled "Gani" for his album Welcome to the Future, released by Speed Records. A year later, he released the single "Life" starring Bollywood actress Adah Sharma.

In 2017 he was awarded "Best Breakthrough Act" at the Brit Asia TV Music Awards.

== Discography ==
=== Film Songs ===
Year	Film	Track	Co-singer(s)	Label	Notes
2016	Vaapsi	Saari Saari Raat		Speed Records	Punjabi Movies
2017	Jindua	Takdi Ravan	Jonita Gandhi	Speed Records	Punjabi Movies
2018	Ishqaa	Ishqaa		Times Music	Punjabi Movies
2019	Luka Chuppi	Duniyaa	Dhvani Bhanushali	T-Series	Bollywood Debut

=== Singles ===
Track	Year	Music	Lyrics	Label	Notes
Muradaan	2014	Anil Saberwal	Akhilll	HSR Entertainment (formerly Yellow Music)	
Supne	2014	Storm DJ	Akhil	HSR Entertainment (formerly Yellow Music)	
Makhual	2015	Manni Sandhu	Akhil	Speed Records	
Khaab	2016	BOB	Raja	Crown Records	Breakthrough single Has crossed 700 Million Views
Gani	2016	Manni Sandhu	Akhil / Vakeel Saab	Speed Records	
Teri Kami	2016	BOB	Happy Raikoti	Speed Records	
Zindagi	2017	Desi Routz	Maninder Kailey	Speed Records	
Life	2017	Preet Hundal	Preet Hundal	Speed Records	
Mere Khuda	2017	BOB	BOB	Speed Records	
Rukh	2017	BOB	Akhil	Speed Records	
Bollywood	2017	Preet Hundal	Babbu	Speed Records	
Akh Lagdi	2018	Desi Routz	Bittu Cheema	Speed Records	
Rang Gora	2018	BOB	Jass Inder	Speed Records	
Teri Khamiyaan	2018	B Praak	Jaani	Speed Records	Featuring Wamiqa Gabbi
Beautiful	2018	BOB	Akhil / BOB	G.K Digital, Lokdhun Punjabi	Featuring Sara Gurpal
Karde Haan	2019	Manni Sandhu	Akhil	Crown Records	
Gaddaar	2019	BOB	Akhil / BOB	Planet Recordz	
Kalla Sohna Nai	2019	Mix Singh	Babbu	Desi Music Factory	Featuring Sanjeeda Shaikh
Deewana	2020	Desi Routz	Maninder Kailey	Desi Music Factory	
Bachalo	2020	Enzo	Nirmaan	White Hill Music	
Dooja Pyaar	2021	Sunny Vik	Raj Fatehpur	Sony Music India	
Perfect	2021	BOB	BOB	Akhil Music	
Paagla	2021	Sunny Vik	Raj Fatehpur	Desi Music Factory	Featuring Avneet Kaur
Shopping Karwade	2021	BOB	Navi Kamboj	White Hill Music	
