= Manni Sandhu =

British record producer

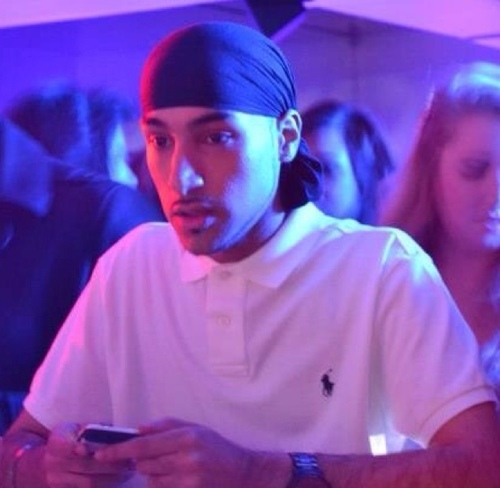

Background information
- Born: Amrinder Singh Sandhu; 26 September 1989 (age 37); London, England
- Genres: Punjabi, hip hop
- Occupations: Music director, record producer, audio engineer, arranger
- Instruments: Harmonium, Keyboard
- Years active: 2010–present
- Labels: Collab Creations Ltd., Speed Record
- Member of: Collab Creations
- Members: Tegi Pannu; Navaan Sandhu
- Website: collabcreations.co.uk

Amrinder Singh Sandhu (born 26 September 1989), also known as Manni Sandhu, is a British record producer associated with Punjabi music. He is most known for working with a numerous Punjabi artists including Manak-E, the late Kaka Bhaniawala, Tegi Pannu, Bakshi Billa, Prabh Gill, Lehmber Hussainpuri, Navaan Sandhu, AP Dhillon, Gurinder Gill, Himmat Sandhu and Akhil. He released his debut album My Time in February 2012 which included his No. 1 single with Bakshi Billa "Sona", and hit song with Manak-E "Door Ni Kulne", as well as six further tracks that charted in the official UK Asian Music Download Chart. Since releasing his first album, he has worked with a number of singers such as Prabh Gill, and later released his third album Against All Odds in 2014.

== Early life ==
Amrinder Singh Sandhu was raised in a Sikh family in Southall, London, and moved to Newcastle upon Tyne at a young age. He began his passion for music at the age of 13, remixing Punjabi music with hip hop, R&B, garage, and drum and bass. He released a number of underground mixtapes under the name 'Dj Manni' titled Solid Sounds and Supremacy. He then began DJing at live Punjabi events around Newcastle furthering his name in the local area and creating links with local DJs and producers. It was at the age of 15 when Sandhu began to produce his own music from his bedroom using a basic computer. As he progressed in the music production field he released a number of mixtapes titled Unsigned Hype and Mutual Concept, alongside JsL. Sandhu was signed to Brown Boi Music in December 2008 and began working on his debut album which was later titled My Time.

== Career ==
=== Pawara (2008) ===
The first official track that Manni Sandhu has released ever was 'pawara' featured Major Chanalia on 16 April 2008. Most of people don't know but that was the first ever fully produced track that Manni Sandhu has made back in 2008.

=== My Time (2012) ===
My Time was released on 23 February 2012. It featured the vocals of Manak-E, Lehmber Hussainpuri, the late Kaka Bhaniawala, Bakshi Billa, Jelly Manjitpuri, Jaswinder Daghamia, Ashok Gill, and Nirmal Sidhu. The first single from the album "Door Ni Kulne" featuring Manak-E was released in October 2010 and was essentially Sandhu's entry into the Punjabi music industry. It was a worldwide success and received over one million YouTube hits, making him one of the first UK born music directors to achieve this. The second single from the album "Sona" featuring Bakshi Billa was released in February 2012, and was No. 1 on the Official UK Asian Download Chart. Further songs that charted from the album were "Bottle" feat. Lehmber Hussainpuri, "Gidhian Di Rani" feat. Jelly Manjitpuri, "Pegg 2012" feat. Jaswinder Daghamia, "Balle Balle" feat. Ashok Gill, "Jaan Sadi" feat. Nirmal Sidhu, and "Husna Di Sarkar" feat. Kaka Bhaniawala, and "Mutiyaar" feat. Malkit Bulla.

On 7 May 2012, Sandhu took part in the Camden Crawl with BBC Radio 1 host Nihal.

=== 2013–today ===
On 1 January 2013, Sandhu released a mixtape under Collab Creations Ltd. entitled Reload. The mixtape brought back the UK garage sound from the early 2000s, and was released as a free download.

In 2013, Abhishek Bachchan performed to Sandhu's song "Bottle" featuring Lehmber Hussainpuri at the TOIFA awards in Vancouver. It was the only Punjabi song used in the performance.

On 27 February 2014, Sandhu released "Friday" featuring Manjit Pappu. "Friday" went straight to number 2 in BBC Asian Network's Official Download Chart in its first week of release.

On 10 June 2016, He released his second album with the title Welcome To The Future featuring artists like Akhil, Prem Lata, Jordan Sandhu, Hustinder and Late(Diljaan).

In 2017 he won Best Single for "Gani" at Brit Asia TV Music Awards (BAMA). He won Best Music Producer at BAMA 2019.

In 2025, Manni Sandhu collaborated with an up and coming singer, Param, whose song "That Girl" with Sandhu skyrocketed to mainstream critical success.

=== Controversy ===
In 2019, singer Dilraj Grewal, who previously was supposed to sing Verified Jatt, but later got dropped for unknown reasons, had accused Manni Sandhu of stealing the song above. But after the legal process, the song which was produced by Sangra Vibes was completely rewritten and composed later. All of the accusations towards Manni Sandhu proved to be false in this way. The song was then sung by Gurj Sidhu.

== Discography ==
=== Studio albums ===
Title	Album details	Tracks
My Time	Released: 2012; Label:Brown Boi Music; Format: CD, Digital download, streaming	12
Welcome to the Future	Released: 2016; Label: Collab Creations & Speed Records; Format: CD, Digital download, streaming	9
Summer Vibes	Released: 2021; Label: Collab Creations; Format: Digital download, streaming	Upcoming

=== Mixtape albums ===
Title	Album details	Tracks
Reload	Released: 2013; Label: Collab Creations; Format: CD, Digital download, streaming	8

== Singles discography ==
Title	Year	Peak chart position		Record Label	Album
Title	Year	UK Asian	UK Punjabi	Record Label	Album
"Door Ni Kulne" (with Manak-E)	2010	2	—	Brown Boi Music Ltd.	My Time
"Sona" (with Bakshi Billa)	2012	1	—	Brown Boi Music Ltd.	My Time
"Friday" (featuring Manjit Pappu)	2014		—	Collab Creations Ltd	
"Makhaul (with Akhil)	2015	—	—	Speed Records	
"Gani (with Akhil)	2016	1	—	Speed Records	Welcome to the Future
Sardaar Bandey (with Jordan Sandhu)	2016			Speed Records	Welcome to the Future
Talk Is Cheap (with Dilraj Grewal)	2018		—	Speed Records & Collab Creations	
In Demand (with Navaan Sandhu)	2018	5	—	Collab Creations	
Special Edition (with Navaan Sandhu)	2018	5	—	Collab Creations	
Karde Haan (with Akhil)	2019	6		Crown Records & Collab Creations	
Verified Jatt (with Gurj Sidhu)	2019	25		Collab Creations	
Radio (with Navaan Sandhu)	2019		—	Collab Creations	
Do Pal (with Navaan Sandhu)	2019	2	14	Collab Creations	
Panjeba (with Jasmine Sandlas)	2019	2	2	Collab Creations	
Sandhu Takeover (with Navaan Sandhu & Amar Sandhu)	2020		2	Collab Creations	
Quarantine Beat	2020	—	—	Collab Creations	
Mann Di Nahi (with Navaan Sandhu & Ezu)	2020	13	5	Collab Creations	
Majhail (with AP Dhillon & Gurinder Gill)	2020	1	1	Collab Creations	
Laara Lappa (with Himmat Sandhu)	2020	—	—	Himmat Sandhu	Sandhu Saab
Into You (with Tegi Pannu)	2021	14	—	Collab Creations	
Offensive (with Divrose)	2021	—	—	Collab Creations	
Schedule (with Tegi Pannu)	2021	4	1	Collab Creations	
Shinin' (with Tegi Pannu)	2021	14	9	Collab Creations	
Fully Loaded (with Tegi Pannu)	2021	11	3	Collab Creations	
Untouchable (with Tegi Pannu)	2022	7	5	Collab Creations	
Roll Deep (with Tegi Pannu)	2022	6	3	Collab Creations	
One Question (with Tegi Pannu)	2022	8	7	Collab Creations	Disturbing The Peace EP
Mood Swing (with Tegi Pannu)	2022	14	12	Collab Creations	Disturbing The Peace EP
Hold You Down (with Tegi Pannu featuring JJ Esko)	2022	15	13	Collab Creations	Disturbing The Peace EP
Small Circle (with Ekam Sudhar featuring Rav Hanjra)	2023			Collab Creations	
No Safety (with Sukha)	2023			Collab Creations	
Holdin' On (with Mohitveer)	2023			Collab Creations	
Sangdi (with Sukha)	2024				
Famous (with Chinna featuring Param)	2025			Collab Creations	No Turning Back EP
That Girl (with Param)	2025			Collab Creations	
Mera Mahi (with Param)	2025			Collab Creations	

== Production discography ==
Title	Year	Artist(s)	Album
Too Notorious	2012	Prabh Gill	Endless
Jaan	2012	Prabh Gill	Endless
Ijazat	2016	Raashi Sood	
Jind Mahi	2018	Diljit Dosanjh	
Addictive	2020	Navaan Sandhu, Raashi Sood	
