= JJ Esko =

British rapper

- Born: Highfields, Leicester, England
- Genres: Hip hop; grime
- Occupation: Rapper
- Years active: 2018–present
- Label: JJ Esko

JJ Esko is a British rapper from Highfields, Leicester. He is of Pakistani origin.

JJ Esko has appeared on the BBC Asian Network, Link Up TV and GRM Daily, with Frenzo Harami, Kenny Allstar, and Pak-Man. He appeared on Popnable on 23 August 2019, where he updated on 14 November 2023 for the last time.

Esko has had ten singles in the top 40 of the Asian Music Chart, including his single "Gliding" which peaked at number 12 in the chart in June 2021.
