= Gurinder Gill =

Indo-Canadian rapper-singer (born 1996)

- Also known as: GG
- Born: Gurinderbir Singh Gill; 14 November 1996 (age 30); Amritsar, Punjab, India
- Origin: Victoria, BC, Canada; Punjab, India
- Genres: Hip hop; R&B; pop rap; trap
- Occupations: Singer; rapper; songwriter
- Instrument: Vocals
- Years active: 2019–present
- Label: Run-Up Records
- Member of: Run-Up

Gurinderbir Singh Gill (born 14 September 1996) is an Indian-born Canadian rapper-singer associated with Punjabi music. His numerous tracks including "Majhail" and "Brown Munde" charted on UK Asian and Punjabi music charts by Official Charts Company. Gill released his debut EP Not by Chance in December 2020. Gurinder, alongside his label-mates AP Dhillon, Shinda Kahlon and Gminxr, work under their label Run-Up Records.

== Career ==
Born to a Sikh family in Punjab, India on 14 September 1996, Gill moved to Canada and started his career in 2019 with a single "Faraar" with Shinda Kahlon and AP Dhillon (credited as producer) under their own label Run-Up Records. Later he released "Feels" with AP Dhillon. His single "Droptop", with AP Dhillon entered UK Asian chart by Official Charts Company, peaked at 28. And entered top 10 on UK Punjabi chart.

In June 2020, he collaborated with AP Dhillon and Manni Sandhu for single "Majhail", which topped both the UK Asian and Punjabi charts, and became their best performance till date. In July 2020, he appeared in "Excuses" by Intense, which peaked at number 3 on UK Asian and topped the UK Punjabi chart. In September 2020, he released "Brown Munde" with Dhillon, Gminxr, and Shinda Kahlon. Nav, Sidhu Moose Wala, Money Musik, and Steel Banglez appeared in its music video. The song entered Apple Music chart in Canada. The song debuted at number one on UK Asian chart, became his second number one on the chart.

== Discography ==
=== Studio albums ===
Title	Details	Peak chart positions	
Title	Details	CAN	NZ
Not By Chance (with AP Dhillon & Money Musik)	Released: 23 December 2020; Label: Run-Up; Format: Digital download, streaming	63	—
Hard Choices	Released: 9 June 2023; Label: Run-Up Records; Music: Gminxr, Money Musik; Format: Digital download, streaming	—	34

=== Extended plays ===
Title	Details	Peak chart positions
Title	Details	CAN
Hidden Gems (with AP Dhillon & Gminxr)	Released: 21 November 2021; Label: Run-Up; Format: Digital download, streaming	—

=== Singles ===
==== As lead artist ====
Title	Year	Peak chart positions					Music	Album
Title	Year	NZ Hot	IND	UK Asian	UK Punjabi	WW (Triller)	Music	Album
"Faraar" (with Shinda Kahlon)	2019	—	—	—	11	—	AP Dhillon	Non-album singles
"Feels" (with AP Dhillon)	2020	—	—	—	—	—	Gminxr	Non-album singles
"Most Wanted" (with AP Dhillon)	2020	—	—	—	—	—	Gminxr	Non-album singles
"Kirsaan" (with AP Dhillon and Gminxr)	2020	—	—	—	—	—	Gminxr & S-Kay	Non-album singles
"Don't Test"	2020	—	—	—	—	—	Gminxr	Non-album singles
"Droptop" (with AP Dhillon and Gminxr)	2020	—	—	15	8	—	Gminxr	Non-album singles
"Majhail" (with AP Dhillon & Manni Sandhu)	2020	—	—	1	1	—	Manni Sandhu	Non-album singles
"Excuses" (with Intense and AP Dhillon)	2020	—	4	3	1	—	Intense	Non-album singles
"Free Smoke" (with AP Dhillon)	2020	—	—	—	—	—	Manu	Non-album singles
"Brown Munde" (with AP Dhillon, Gminxr & Shinda Kahlon)	2020	—	—	1	1	3	Gminxr	Non-album singles
"Foreigns" (with AP Dhillon)	2020	—	—	2	2	—	Money Musik	Not By Chance
"Goat" (with AP Dhillon)	2020	21	—	2	3	—	Money Musik	Not By Chance
"Fate" (with AP Dhillon and Shinda Kahlon)	2020	33	—	—	5	—	Money Musik	Not By Chance
"Takeover" (with AP Dhillon and AR Paisley)	2020	28	—	—	10	—	Money Musik	Not By Chance
"Chances" (with AP Dhillon)	2020	29	—	—	3	—	Money Musik	Not By Chance
"Drip" (with AP Dhillon and Duvy)	2020	—	—	—	13	—	Money Musik	Not By Chance
"Insane" (with AP Dhillon, Gminxr & Shinda Kahlon)	2021	10	—	1	—	—	Gminxr & PVLI	Non-album single
"Against All Odds" (with Shinda Kahlon, Gminxr and AP Dhillon )	2021	—	—	—	—	—	Gminxr	Hidden Gems
"Majhe Alle" (with Shinda Kahlon, Gminxr & AP Dhillon)	2021	—	—	—	—	—	Gminxr	Hidden Gems
"Tere Te" (with AP Dhillon)	2021	32	—	4	—	—	AP Dhillon	Hidden Gems
"Desires" (with AP Dhillon)	2021	22	—	3	—	—	AP Dhillon	Hidden Gems
"War" (with AP Dhillon)	2021	—	—	—	—	—	Manu	Hidden Gems
"Wake Up"	2023	20	—	6	5	—	Manu/Muddy	Hard Choices
"Network"	2023	29	—	10	6	—	Sach	Hard Choices
"Breathe"	2023	36	—	9	7	—	Money Musik & Manu	Hard Choices
"4 Bakyian" (with Money Musik)	2023	37	—	—	12	—	Money Musik	Hard Choices
Forever (with Gminxr)	2023	—	—	—	13	—	Gminxr & Deep	Hard Choices
Lonestar (with Gminxr)	2023	—	—	—	16	—	Gminxr	Hard Choices
"Moments" (with Gminxr)	2023	—	—	—	17	—	Gminxr	Hard Choices
"Times Up"	2023	—		—			Manu, GG & Sach	
"GG"	2025							World Is Ours
"World is Ours"	2025							World Is Ours
"Rich Heart"	2025							Rich Heart

==== As featured artist ====
Title	Year	Peak chart position					Album
Title	Year	CAN	IND	NZ hot	UK Asian	UK Punjabi	Album
"Regret" (Navaan Sandhu featuring Gurinder Gill)	2025	—			—	—	House Navior

=== Guest appearances ===
Title	Year	Album
Late Knights (Divine ft. Gurinder Gill)	2025	Walking on Water

== Filmography ==
=== Web series ===
Year	Title	Role	Notes
2023	AP Dhillon: First of a Kind	Himself	Amazon Prime original
