= AP Dhillon =

Indo-Canadian singer and rapper (born 1993)

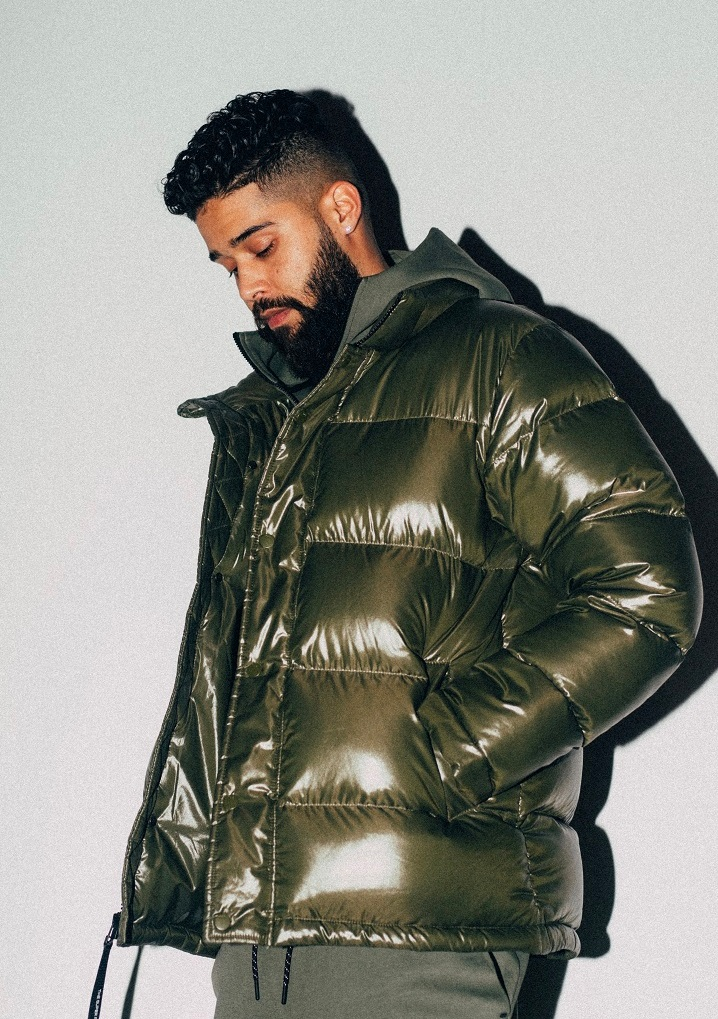
- Dhillon in 2021
- Born: Amritpal Singh Dhillon; January 10, 1993 (age 33); Mulianwali, Punjab, India
- Education: Camosun College
- Occupations: Singer; rapper; songwriter; record producer; mix-mastering
- Years active: 2019–present
- Musical career
- Origin: Victoria, British Columbia, Canada; Punjab, India
- Genres: Hip hop; pop; R&B; trap
- Instrument: Vocals
- Labels: Run-Up; Collab Creations; Mass Appeal India; Republic
- Member of: Run-Up

Amritpal Singh "AP" Dhillon (born January 10, 1993) is an Indo-Canadian singer-rapper and record producer associated with Punjabi music. Five of his singles have peaked on the Official Charts Company UK Asian and Punjabi charts, while "Majhail" and "Brown Munde" have topped Billboard charts. Dhillon, alongside his label-mates Gurinder Gill, Shinda Kahlon, and Gminxr, works as a group under their label, Run-Up Records.

== Early life ==
Amritpal Singh Dhillon was born on January 10, 1993, in the village of Mulianwali in Punjab, India. He studied at the Little Flower Convent School and completed his graduation in Civil Engineering from Baba Kuma Singh Ji Engineering College in Amritsar. Dhillon moved to Vancouver Island in Canada where he pursued a Diploma in Business Administration and Management from Camosun College in Saanich, British Columbia. He briefly worked at Best Buy before pivoting to music.

== Career ==
Dhillon started in 2019 with the single track "Fake" with Shinda Kahlon under their own independent label, Run-Up Records. Later he appeared in the video, credited as the producer, of the track "Faraar" by Gurinder Gill and Shinda Kahlon.

In 2020, his single "Deadly" with producer Gminxr entered the UK Asian chart published by the Official Charts Company, and peaked at number 11. Also, the song entered the top 5 on the UK Punjabi chart. His next single, "Droptop" with Gurinder Gill also appeared on both UK Asian and UK Punjabi chart. In June 2020, he collaborated with Gurinder Gill and Manni Sandhu for single "Majhail", which topped both the UK Asian and Punjabi chart, and became their best performance till date. In July 2020, he and Gurinder Gill appeared in "Excuses" by Intense, which peaked at number 3 on UK Asian and topped the UK Punjabi chart. In September 2020, he released "Brown Munde" with Gurinder Gill, Gminxr, and Shinda Kahlon. Nav, Sidhu Moose Wala, Money Musik, Anmol Dalwani and Steel Banglez appeared in its music video. The song entered Apple Music chart in Canada. The song debuted at number one on the UK Asian chart, became his second number one on the chart. As of February 2025, "Brown Munde" got more than 738 million views overall on YouTube.

In 2020, AP Dhillon released his first collaborative album, Not by Chance with Gurinder Gill and Money Musik. All seven tracks from the EP charted on the NZ charts and peaked at top five of the Official Punjabi Music chart in the UK.

In 2021, AP Dhillon and his team performed a live concert for the first time as part of the "Over The Top – The Takeover Tour" in major 6 cities in India. Dhillon also partnered with boAt for brand association. Dhillon released a collaborative EP, Hidden Gems with Gurinder Gill and Gminxr in fall 2021.

In 2022, Dhillon collaborated with Amazon Prime Video for the promotion of the third season of The Boys, under which he cued an exclusive version of his track "Insane" in the trailer.

In 2023, Dhillon was the first Punjabi language artist to perform at the 2023 Juno Awards in Edmonton, Canada.

== Personal life ==
Dhillon lives in Colwood, British Columbia.

== Discography ==
=== Studio albums ===
- Not by Chance (2020) (with Gurinder Gill and Money Musik)
- The Brownprint (2024)

== Filmography ==
=== Web series ===
Year	Title	Role	Notes
2023	AP Dhillon: First of a Kind	Himself (5 episodes)	Amazon Prime original

=== Television ===
Year	Title	Role	Notes
2026	The Great Indian Kapil Show	Guest	On Netflix
