= Gminxr =

Indo-Canadian record producer

- Born: Gugundeep Singh Randhawa; Punjab, India
- Origin: Punjab, India; Victoria, BC, Canada
- Genres: Hip hop; R&B; pop rap; trap
- Occupation: Record producer
- Years active: 2019–present
- Label: Run-Up Records
- Member of: Run-Up
- Members: AP Dhillon; Shinda Kahlon; Gurinder Gill

Gugundeep Singh Randhawa, known professionally as Gminxr, is a Canadian record producer associated with Punjabi music. His numerous singles including ‘Brown Munde’ and ‘Insane’ charted on UK Asian and UK Punjabi music charts and New Zealand Hot Singles. Gminxr, alongside his label-mates AP Dhillon, Shinda Kahlon and Gurinder Gill works as a group under their label Run-Up Records. He also worked with other artists notably Jassa Dhillon and Sukha.

Gminxr released his debut EP ‘Hidden Gems’ with AP Dhillon and Gurinder Gill in December 2021. Born to a Sikh family in Punjab, India, Randhawa lives in Canada.

== Discography ==
=== Extended plays ===
| Title | Details |
|---|---|
| Hidden Gems (with AP Dhillon & Gurinder Gill) | Released: November 21, 2021; Label: Run-Up; Format: Digital download, streaming |
| Breaking Through (with Zehr Vibe) | Released: July 19, 2024; Label: Jattlife Studios; Format: Digital download, streaming |

== Singles discography ==
=== As lead artist ===
List of singles with peak chart positions
| Title | Year | Peak chart positions | | | Album |
| Title | Year | NZ Hot | UK Asian | UK Punjabi | Album |
|---|---|---|---|---|---|
| "Fake" (with AP Dhillon) | 2019 | — | — | — | |
| "Arrogant" (with AP Dhillon and Shinda Kahlon) | 2020 | — | — | — | |
| "Feels" (with AP Dhillon & Gurinder Gill) | 2020 | — | — | — | |
| "Most Wanted" with (Gurinder Gill) | 2020 | — | — | — | |
| "Hustlin'" (with a4 & AP Dhillon) | 2020 | — | — | — | |
| "Don't Test" (with Gurinder Gill) | 2020 | — | — | — | |
| "Deadly" (with AP Dhillon) | 2020 | — | 11 | 4 | |
| "Kirsaan" (with AP Dhillon & Gurinder Gill) | 2020 | — | — | — | |
| "Droptop" (with AP Dhillon & Gurinder Gill) | 2020 | — | 28 | 8 | |
| "Brown Munde" (AP Dhillon, Gminxr, Gurinder Gill & Shinda Kahlon) | 2020 | — | 1 | 1 | |
| "Insane" (AP Dhillon, Shinda Kahlon and Gurinder Gill) | 2021 | 10 | 1 | — | |
| "Against All Odds" (AP Dhillon, Shinda Kahlon and Gurinder Gill) | 2021 | — | — | 7 | Hidden Gems |
| "Majhe Aale" (AP Dhillon, Shinda Kahlon and Gurinder Gill) | 2021 | — | 32 | 6 | Hidden Gems |
| "Spaceship" (AP Dhillon & Shinda Kahlon) | 2021 | — | 8 | 5 | Hidden Gems |
| "Final Thoughts" (AP Dhillon and Shinda Kahlon) | 2022 | — | — | 9 | Two Hearts Never Break the Same |
| Forever (Gurinder Gill) | 2023 | — | — | 13 | Hard Choices |
| Lonestar (Gurinder Gill) | 2023 | — | — | 16 | Hard Choices |
| "Moments" (Gurinder Gill) | 2023 | — | — | 17 | Hard Choices |
| Once I'm Gone (with Zehr Vibe) | 2024 | | | | Breaking Through |

=== As featured artist ===
| Title | Year | Label | Album |
|---|---|---|---|
| Big Shot (Aardee featuring Gminxr) | 2020 | | |
| Santorini (a4 featuring Gminxr) | 2021 | a4secret | 4PLAY |
| Troublesome (Sukha featuring Gminxr) | 2023 | | Undisputed |
| Tough (Jassa Dhillon featuring Gminxr) | 2023 | | Bombaa |

== Production discography ==
=== Singles produced ===
List of singles with peak chart positions
| Title | Year | Co-producer | Peak chart positions | | | Album |
| Title | Year | Co-producer | NZ Hot | UK Asian | UK Punjabi | Album |
|---|---|---|---|---|---|---|
| "Fake" (AP Dhillon) | 2019 | — | — | — | — | |
| "Arrogant" (with AP Dhillon and Shinda Kahlon) | 2020 | — | — | — | — | |
| "Feels" (AP Dhillon Gurinder Gill) | 2020 | — | — | — | — | |
| "Most Wanted" (Gurinder Gill) | 2020 | — | — | — | — | |
| "Hustlin'" (Gminxr, a4 & AP Dhillon) | 2020 | — | — | — | — | |
| "Don't Test" (Gurinder Gill) | 2020 | — | — | — | — | |
| "Deadly" (AP Dhillon) | 2020 | — | — | 11 | 4 | |
| Big Shot (Aardee) | 2020 | — | | | | |
| "Kirsaan" (AP Dhillon) | 2020 | S-Kay | — | — | — | |
| "Droptop" (AP Dhillon) | 2020 | — | — | 28 | 8 | |
| "Brown Munde" (AP Dhillon, Gminxr, Gurinder Gill & Shinda Kahlon) | 2020 | — | — | 1 | 1 | |
| "Insane" (AP Dhillon, Shinda Kahlon and Gurinder Gill) | 2021 | Pvli | 10 | 1 | — | |
| "Against All Odds" (AP Dhillon, Shinda Kahlon and Gurinder Gill) | 2021 | — | — | — | 7 | Hidden Gems |
| "Majhe Aale" (AP Dhillon, Shinda Kahlon and Gurinder Gill) | 2021 | — | — | 32 | 6 | Hidden Gems |
| "Spaceship" (AP Dhillon & Shinda Kahlon) | 2021 | — | — | 8 | 5 | Hidden Gems |
| "Final Thoughts" (AP Dhillon and Shinda Kahlon) | 2022 | Osrs | — | — | 9 | Two Hearts Never Break the Same |
| Forever (Gurinder Gill) | 2023 | Deep | — | — | 13 | Hard Choices |
| Lonestar (Gurinder Gill) | 2023 | — | — | — | 16 | Hard Choices |
| "Moments" (Gurinder Gill) | 2023 | — | — | — | 17 | Hard Choices |
| 21 Questions (Sukha featuring Jassa Dhillon) | 2023 | ProdGK | | | 14 | Undisputed |
| Troublesome (Sukha) | 2023 | — | | | 17 | Undisputed |
| Tough (Jassa Dhillon) | 2023 | — | | | | Bombaa |

== Filmography ==
=== Web series ===
| Year | Title | Role | Notes |
|---|---|---|---|
| 2023 | AP Dhillon: First of a Kind | Main role (5 episodes) | Amazon Prime original |
