= Zaremba =

Origin
- Language: Polish
- Region of origin: Poland

Zaremba [zaˈrɛmba] is a surname of Polish-language origin. Eventually derived from the verb zarąbać ("to chop"), it may be an occupational surname for a woodcutter or a habitational name from places such as Zaręby. The Polish word zaremba means the 'area cleaned of vegetation'. Archaic feminine forms (now used colloquially): Zarembina (after the husband) and Zarembianka (after the father). Notable people with the name include:

- Aleksandra Zaremba (born 2001), Polish female footballer
- Andrzej Zaremba (died 1317 or 1318), Bishop of Poznań, 14th century
- Ewa Szelburg-Zarembina (1899–1986), Polish writer
- Eve Zaremba (1930–2025), Polish-born Canadian mystery writer
- John Zaremba (1908–1986), American actor
- Helena Zarembina (1895–1960), Polish actress
- Maciej Zaremba (born 1951), Swedish journalist
- Mateusz Zaremba (born 1984), Polish handballer
- Natalia Zarembina (1895–1973), Polish writer
- Nikolai Zaremba (1821–1879), Russian composer and teacher
- Ota Zaremba (1957–2026), Czech weightlifter
- Peter Zaremba (athlete) (1908–1994), American hammer thrower
- Peter Zaremba (musician), member of The Fleshtones
- Sigismund Zaremba (1861–1915), Ukrainian composer
- Stanisław Zaremba (bishop of Kyiv) (?–1648), writer, abbot, Cistercian, bishop of Kyiv
- Stanisław Zaremba (mathematician) (1863–1942), Polish mathematician
- Stanisław Krystyn Zaremba (1903–1990), Polish mathematician and mountaineer
- Thomas II, bishop of Wrocław, Bishop of Wrocław, 13th century
- Vladyslav Zaremba (1833–1902), Ukrainian composer and teacher
- Wojciech Zaremba (born 1988), Polish computer scientist, co-founder of OpenAI
- Hubert Hilscher (1924–1994) used the name as a pseudonym when he was a soldier

== Fictional characters ==
- Jan Zaremba in the 1913 operetta Polenblut (Polish Blood) and its adaptations
- Dariusz Zaremba , a supporting character in Michelle Granas 2013 novel Zaremba or Love and the Rule of Law.

== See also ==
- Zaremba coat of arms
- Zaręba
- Zarębów
- Zarębki
