= Susan G. Cole =

Canadian feminist author, activist, editor, speaker and playwright

Susan G Cole
- Born: February 9, 1952 (age 74); Toronto, Ontario, Canada
- Occupation: Activist / Author / Radio Broadcaster
- Writing career
- Notable works: Pornography and the Sex Crisis, Power Surge: Sex Violence and Pornography
- Notable awards: YMCA's Woman of Distinction

Susan G. Cole (born February 9, 1952) is a Canadian feminist author, activist, editor, speaker and playwright. She has spoken out on a number of issues, including free speech, pornography, race and religion. As a lesbian activist and mother, she speaks out on sexuality and family issues and is a columnist.

== Early life ==
Cole was born on February 9, 1952, to Lillian and Maxwell Cole. She has two siblings, Ellen Cole and Peter Cole. In 1970, she graduated from Forest Hill Collegiate, where she was the first female to be elected president of the student council. She later received her Bachelor of Arts in classics at Harvard College, where she helped found the university's first women's collective in 1970. She received the Rockefeller Fellowship from Harvard College in 1974 and spent her fellowship year travelling to Greece.

== Early work ==
Cole began her work life as a story editor for the news magazine television show The Education of Mike McManus at what is now TVOntario. While on the job she met author and Maclean's editor Peter C. Newman who, in 1976, made her his principal researcher for his book The Bronfman Dynasty (McClelland & Stewart). While working for Newman, Cole helped found the Broadside Collective, which produced a monthly feminist magazine from 1978 to 1988. Access to all issues can be found at the Women's Archives in Ottawa. During this period, Cole began her work on pornography, developing a feminist analysis that paved the way for her upcoming books.

== Anti-pornography activism ==
Cole was a member of Women Against Violence Against Women (WAVAW), when the movie Snuff, a pornographic flick bragging that it featured the murder of a woman as a sexual spectacle, came to Toronto in 1978. She spoke at a rally outside Cinema 2000, where the film was showing, urging demonstrators to head to the theatre to shut it down and to set off a series of demonstrations outside the theatre. WAVAW went on to focus on several actions, including erecting an alternative cenotaph on Remembrance Day acknowledging "Every Woman Raped In Every War."

Cole's anti-pornography activism triggered her public speaking career, as she travelled across Canada to talk about pornography. She published Pornography and the Sex Crisis (Second Story) in 1988, which encapsulated her point of view and which expanded her speaking engagements, including a series of debates on college campuses with Al Goldstein, editor of Screw.

In 1995, she published Power Surge: Sex Violence and Pornography (Second Story), a collection of articles she wrote in Broadside, in the anthologies Still Ain’t Satisfied and No Safe Place (both available from Second Story Press) and in NOW, where she was then a contributing editor and is now books and senior entertainment editor.

Cole continues to speak on pornography and is currently involved in a series of debates on North American campuses with the ex-porn star Ron Jeremy.

== Freedom of speech ==
Her 2010 appearance on FOX News in support of students protesting the appearance of Ann Coulter on the University of Ottawa campus has engaged her in the debate on freedom of speech.

== Playwriting ==
Cole was a board member of Nightwood Theatre, Canada's premiere women's theatre company, from 1988 to 1991. During that time she was a participant and early organizer of Nightwood's 5-Minute Feminist Cabaret, where, in 1988, she performed a monologue about her experience with her lesbian partner Leslie of trying to conceive a child. The performance inspired Nightwood to commission a full-length play, which Cole completed in 1991. Her comedy, A Fertile Imagination, debuted in 1991 with Nightwood under the direction of Kate Lushington and received seven subsequent productions across Canada. Playwrights Canada Press engaged Cole to collect and edit a series of lesbian monologues from Canadian plays. OutSpoken: A Canadian Collection of Lesbian Scenes and Monologues was released in 2009.

== Lesbian activism ==
Cole is one of the co-founders of the Lesbian Organization of Toronto (LOOT), the first political organization of gay women in Toronto, and through the 1980s was an out lesbian prepared to speak public. She now programs the Proud Voices literary stages at Toronto's Pride Week celebrations.

== Music ==
In the late 1970s, Cole was the co-founder of the Toronto all-women's band, Mama Quilla II, alongside musicians such as Lorraine Segato and Lauri Conger. Cole left the group well prior to their only recording, a 1982 EP engineered by Daniel Lanois (by which time the group was no longer an all-female band). Mama Quilla II later evolved into Parachute Club, but Cole was not part of the new group, instead going on to play piano and write songs for No Frills Band with Sherry Shute, Catherine Mackay and Evelyne Datl. No Frills played the first Gay Pride march in Toronto in 1981. A track recorded by No Frills appears on The Rebel Zone soundtrack.

== Media ==
Coal can be heard weekly on Toronto radio on CFMJ, where she sits on the Media and the Message panel on John Oakley's show every Thursday morning. She can also be heard on Proud FM every Thursday afternoon. She contributes a column to the feminist quarterly Herizons and can be read every week in NOW

Cole began writing for NOW in the early 80s, and took a regular part-time job as a headline writer in 1988. That soon blossomed into a full editorship, and Cole currently holds the title of books and entertainment editor. In that role, Cole has become an on-stage interviewer and can be seen directing literary traffic annually at the International Festival of Authors at Toronto's Harbourfront Centre, and at Toronto's Luminato festival. She is also the programmer of Proud Voices, the literary stages at Toronto Pride.

Cole lives with her partner Leslie Chudnovsky in Toronto.
