= Bi-National Lesbian Conference =

The first annual Bi-National Lesbian Conference happened in Toronto in May 1979.

== Organizing ==
The conference was organized by members of the Lesbian Organization of Toronto (LOOT) in cooperation with members of the Toronto International Women's Day Organizing Committee. The organizers began planning in November 1978, sent out written questionnaires to lesbians all over the country to determine the content of the event, and also managed to raise $14,000 in conference costs through fundraisers, raffles and other community initiatives.

The organizing collective stated in their conference program that it was their hope that:

This conference will provide us all with the opportunity to exchange experience and ideas, to share our culture and form a common direction.

— BNLC Conf. Program, on file at Canadian Women's Movement Archives, quoted: Ross, Becki. The House That Jill Built: A Lesbian Nation in Formation, 1995, p191

== The conference ==
The conference drew 400 registrants, from Canada, the United States and other countries. Thirty-five workshop sessions were offered at Hart House, on the University of Toronto Campus, on subjects ranging from bicycle repair to discussion-based sessions exploring topical issues in the lesbian movement of the time. All sessions were conducted in English but simultaneous translation was offered for French language speakers.

Saturday evening featured a live concert with the Toronto band who went on to become the Parachute Club, Mama Quilla II.

In her Lesbian History of the Lesbian Organization of Toronto, The House that Jill Built, Becki Ross quotes conference attendee Naomi Brooks about the excitement the conference generated in the lesbian community at the time:

We felt that we had built a national lesbian movement. This was it, it was happening.

— Brooks, Naomi, quoted in Becki Ross. The House That Jill Built: A Lesbian Nation in Formation, 1995, p192

== After the conference ==
The conference spurred on the creation of a Canada-wide lesbian magazine, Lesbian/Lesbienne: the National Newspaper of the Lesbian Movement.

Subsequent Bi National Lesbian Conferences were held in Vancouver, British Columbia; Montreal, Quebec; Calgary, Alberta; and several other larger Canadian cities.

The 1981 (fifth) Conference in Vancouver has the distinction of launching Canada's first (lesbian pride) Dyke March. In 1982, Toronto lesbian organization Lesbians Against the Right, which grew out of the now defunct Lesbian Organization of Toronto, organized a second Canadian Dyke March in Toronto, Ontario.
