= Lesbian Organization of Toronto =

1970s Canadian organization

- Abbreviation: LOOT
- Formation: 1976
- Dissolved: 1984
- Type: Lesbian organization
- Legal status: inactive
- Purpose: advocate and public voice, educator and network
- Headquarters: Toronto, Ontario, Canada

The Lesbian Organization of Toronto (L.O.O.T. or LOOT) was a lesbian organization founded in 1976 and disbanded in 1980. The group was Toronto's first openly lesbian feminist group, and its members elected to open Canada's first Lesbian Centre.

== History ==
L.O.O.T. grew out of an October 1976 meeting convened in the C.H.A.T. (Community Homophile Association of Toronto) offices on Church Street. Fiona Rattray, an original member, estimates the meeting was attended by 30–60 lesbians. Members present at this meeting decided to rent part of a house (342 Jarvis St), to develop a multi-use lesbian centre. The collective also included Eve Zaremba, who would later become one of Canada's first notable openly lesbian writers, and Lynne Fernie, a noted documentary filmmaker.

The Lesbian Organization of Toronto shared the building with two other compatible organizations; The Other Woman, one of Toronto's longest lasting feminist newsmagazines, and the Three of Cups Women's Coffeehouse. L.O.O.T. moved into the house on February 1, 1977.

== Purpose ==
Member Gay Bell referred to the lesbian centre as a "crucial locus of (the lesbian community's) development ... in Toronto". One of the group's earliest public statements explains that it hopes to "serve as a bridge to unify various existing groups who can provide services to the lesbian community."

Organizers also believed that an available physical space for lesbians would "raise the profile of lesbians in the city, and make it possible for them to come out of the closet in the company of other lesbians without fear of reprisals." Collective member Nancy Adamson is quoted in Becki L. Ross' history of L.O.O.T., The House that Jill Built: Lesbian Nation in Formation, as saying that the organization gave lesbians in the city a much-needed "safe place in the world"".

L.O.O.T.'s first newsletter described its purpose as "an umbrella organization for lesbians. It serves social, recreational, personal, cultural, political and educational purposes for the lesbians involved. Mostly, it simply allows a lesbian to meet and get together with other lesbians who share her interests."

In Rites, a Toronto gay and lesbian newspaper, journalist Megan Davies emphasises some of L.O.O.T.'s social aspects, referring to the group as an important resource for countless lesbians in Toronto, offering a safe, lesbian-positive environment in which to come out and meet other lesbians.

L.O.O.T. was for womyn-born womyn only. A formal request to join the organization was made by a male-to-female transsexual lesbian in 1978. In response, the organization voted to exclude trans women. During informal discussion, members of L.O.O.T expressed their outrage that in their view a "sex-change he-creature... dared to identify himself as a woman and a lesbian." In their public response L.O.O.T. wrote:

A woman's voice was almost never heard as a woman's voice – it was always filtered through men's voices. So here a guy comes along saying, "I'm going to be a girl now and speak for girls." And we thought, "No you're not." A person cannot just join the colonized by fiat.

== Activities ==
The organization regularly provided peer support, telephone counselling, dances, social and political activities, a lending library, a newsletter, potluck socials, brunches, concerts and performances by well-known feminist and lesbian musicians like Ferron, Alix Dobkin, Mama Quilla II, and Beverley Glenn Copeland.

In 1979, L.O.O.T. members, in collaboration with the International Women's Day Committee, organized that year's Bi-National Lesbian Conference on the University of Toronto campus.

== Closure ==
The Lesbian Centre at 342 Jarvis closed May 1, 1980. Historian Becki Ross refers to the factors leading to the organization's closure as "multiple and complex" and notes that they included political differences, fragmented membership, volunteer burn-out, inflated expectations, lost organizational focus and changing political climate.

After the closure of the centre, L.O.O.T.'s telephone peer counselling functions were taken over by the Lesbian Phone Line, who continued to offer this service in the city until 1984.

== Other information ==
The L.O.O.T. Oral History Project collection is held at the University of Ottawa Archives and Special Collections. Many of L.O.O.T. archival materials are preserved in the Canadian Women's Movement Archives collection, now listed in the Canadian Memory of the World Register of the Canadian Commission for UNESCO.
