= Mama Quilla II =

Canadian rock band

- Origin: Toronto, Ontario, Canada
- Genres: Rock
- Years active: 1977–1982
- Past members: Lorraine Segato; Lauri Conger; Billy Bryans; Linda Jain; Linda Robitaille; Susan Sturman; Catherine McKay; Jacqui Snedker; Maxine Walsh; Susan Cole; BJ Danylchuk

Mama Quilla II was a Canadian rock band that first performed together in 1977 in Toronto and dissolved in 1982. Although the band recorded only a single EP as Mama Quilla II, after 1982 a revised lineup evolved into the influential pop band Parachute Club.

== History ==
Mama Quilla II developed out of a band called Mama Quilla (named after the Inca Goddess Mama Quilla). The original Mama Quilla was formed in the early 1970s by Sara Ellen Dunlop, a "major independent figure on the Toronto music scene who died of cancer in 1975." Original Mama Quilla members included Linda Jain, Linda Robitaille and Jackie Snedker, as well as Dunlop.

=== Relationship to "women's music" ===
Keyboard player Lauri Conger describes a time at the beginning of the band's history when she decided to "make a political shift (from being the only woman in the bands she played with) ...to work with women." Conger also notes that MQII was one of the earliest women's music groups to go electric rather than playing acoustic instruments.

=== High profile shows ===
Mama Quilla II headlined at the First Annual Bi-National Lesbian Conference in Toronto, which was put on by members of the Lesbian Organization of Toronto (LOOT) with members of the Toronto International Women’s Day Committee in May 1979.

=== Transformation into Parachute Club ===
With Mama Quilla II's material being written by Susan Sturman, MQII vocalist Lorraine Segato and percussionist Billy Bryans had founded a spin-off group called V to showcase their own material. V had been asked to play the 1982 Toronto Festival of Festivals, but several band personnel were unavailable. Instead, Segato and Bryans recruited MQII keyboard player Lauri Conger and other area session players for the gig, and dubbed the new group The Parachute Club. The Parachute Club continued as a working band and signed a recording deal with Current Records in 1983, while Mama Quilla II was effectively dissolved.

== Band members ==
Personnel changed over the band’s five-year existence, but Mama Quilla II was usually a seven-piece all-female band. The main band personnel were as follows: Lorraine Segato (vocals, guitar), Lauri Conger (keyboards, vocals), Linda Jain (drums, percussion), Linda Robitaille (saxophone, vocals), Susan Sturman (guitars), Catherine McKay (bass, vocals) and then Jacqui Snedker (bass, vocals), Maxine Walsh (percussion), Susan Cole (vocals and piano) and BJ Danylchuk (keyboards, vocals). Nancy Poole acted as the group's manager. Billy Bryans, who would later become a bandmate of Segato and Conger in Parachute Club, also sometimes performed with the band on percussion; by 1982, he was a full member of the group, and plays on their EP. As the only man performing with an otherwise all-female band, his bandmates jokingly gave him a T-shirt which read "Token Male".

== Discography ==
- 1982 KKK//Mama Quilla/Angry Young Woman Tupperwaros; EP. Produced by Billy Bryans. Engineered by Daniel Lanois.
