= Antoni Kocipiński =

Polish composer, musician, and music publisher (1816–1866)

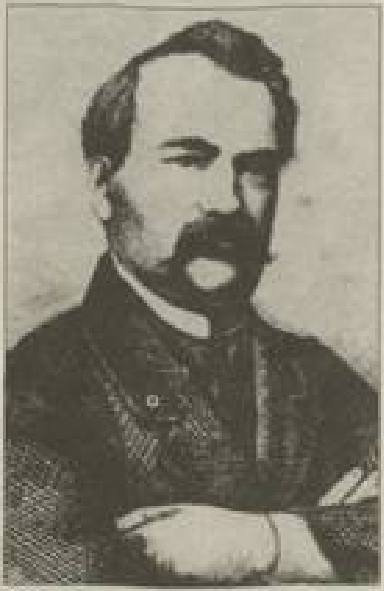
Antoni Kocipiński

Antoni Kocipiński (1816 – 26 May [O.S. 14 May] 1866) was a Polish composer, musician, and music publisher. He was mostly active in what is now Ukraine, at the time the areas where he operated were part of the Austrian Empire.

== Life and career ==
Kocipiński was born in Andrychów in 1816. He received education in Lviv, studied piano, organ, and composition with his father, an organist at the Lviv Cathedral, and served for ten years in the Austrian military orchestra in Chernivtsi. In 1845–46, Kocipiński moved to Kamianets-Podilskyi. Kocipiński gave music lessons (Among his pupils was Vladyslav Zaremba) and worked in a music store. At the same time, he began to collect and transcribe Ukrainian folk songs. In 1849, Kocipiński was exiled for possessing banned poems by Juliusz Słowacki, living in Vienna. He later returned to Kamianets-Podilskyi in 1852–53. From 1855, he lived in Kyiv. He published music and opened music stores in Kamianets-Podilskyi, Kyiv, Chișinău, and Zhytomyr.

Kocipiński popularized Ukrainian folk songs as well as publishing works of local composers. While under police surveillance, he organized weekly musical evenings. The musician performed as a tenor and was a skilled harmonium soloist. Kocipiński published a collection of Ruthenian folk music in Ukraine: the first edition (1861) contained transcriptions of the melodies, while the second (1862) was in the form of an arrangement for voice and piano. The newspaper Kievlyanin attacked him for printing Cossack songs in Latin script (something which had been prohibited). Kocipiński died on 26 May 1866 in Kyiv.

Because of the Tsarist Russification efforts in the 1860s and 1870s, his collection was banned in the Russian Empire. Later reprints only appeared in 1885, 1891, and 1899.

== Music ==
Kocipiński composed mostly typical salon music genres, which included piano polonaises, mazurkas, romances, and songs. He transcribed, harmonized, and composed the piano accompaniment for the song Gandzia by Denys Bonkovskyi. Some of his compositions are based on folk music.
