= Vladyslav Zaremba =

Ukrainian composer and pianist (1833–1902)

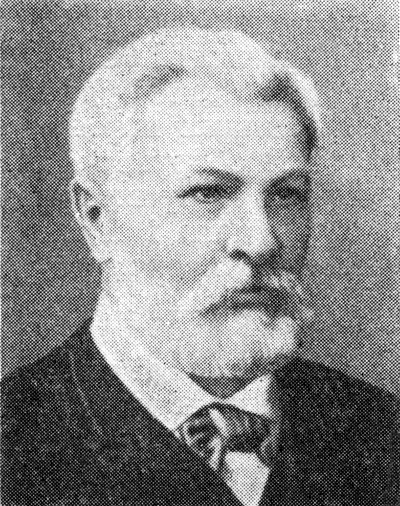
Vladyslav Zaremba

Vladyslav Ivanovych Zaremba (Note: Ukrainian: Владисла́в Іва́нович Заре́мба, romanized: Vladyslav Ivanovych Zaremba; Russian: Владисла́в Іва́нович Заре́мба, romanized: Vladislav Ivanovich Zaremba; Polish: Władysław Zaremba (also Zaręba)) (27 June [O.S. 15 June] 1833 – 24 October [O.S. 11 October] 1902) was a Ukrainian composer and pianist of Polish origin. He was the brother of Nikolai Zaremba and the father of Sigizmund Zaremba.

Zaremba was born in Dunaivtsi. His family moved to Kamianets-Podilskyi in 1846, where he studied music with Józef and Antoni Kocipiński. After completing his studies, he lived outside of Kamianets-Podilskyi. Zaremba returned in 1854 and worked as an organist in a church. For unknown reasons, Zaremba was under polish surveillance at this time. In 1856 he moved to Zhytomyr, where he began to teach, perform, and compose music. His son Sigizmund was born there. From 1862 he lived in Kyiv, giving piano and choral singing lessons at various institutions. He was also a music critic and an active member of the Russian Musical Society. Zaremba was a conductor of some amateur choirs. He died in Kyiv, aged 69, and was buried in the Baikove Cemetery. The Zaremba street in Kyiv was named in honor of Vladyslav Zaremba. The Khmelnytskyi Music College is also named after him.

The composer wrote plays and arranged Polish, Russian, and Ukrainian folk music for piano. He also composed over thirty songs and romances set to Ukrainian verses from Kobzar by Taras Shevchenko and Polish texts. Zaremba compiled and published two pedagogical collections: Śpiewnik dla naszych dziatek (Songbook for Our Children) for voice and Mały Paderewski (Little Paderewski) for piano.
