= Dyke march =

Lesbian-led gathering and protest march

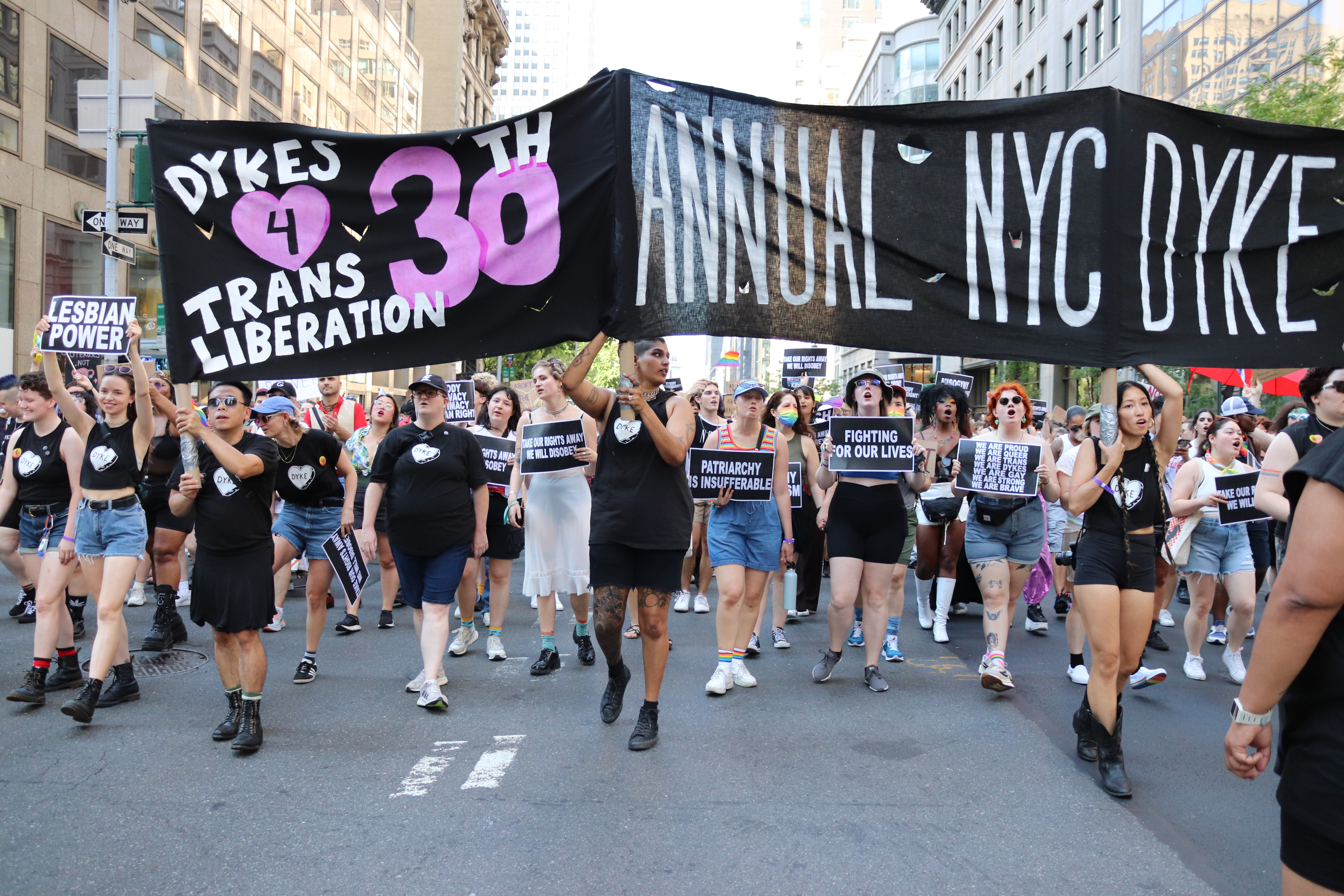
NYC Dyke March, 2022. The New York City march is one of the world's largest commemorations of lesbian pride and culture.

A dyke march is a lesbian visibility and protest march, much like the original Gay Pride parades and gay rights demonstrations. The main purpose of a dyke march is the encouragement of activism within the lesbian and sapphic community. Dyke marches commonly take place the Friday or Saturday before LGBTQ pride parades. Larger metropolitan areas usually have several Pride-related happenings (including picnics, workshops, arts festivals, parties, benefits, dances, and bar events) both before and after the march to further community building; with social outreach to specific segments such as older women, women of color, and lesbian parenting groups.

Dyke marches are concentrated in various influential cities across North America, Europe, and Latin America. The first Dyke March was conducted in the United States in 1993 in Washington, D.C. Cities in the U.S. where dyke marches may be found include New York City (with marches in the boroughs of Manhattan, Brooklyn, and Queens), Atlanta, Boston, Buffalo, Chicago, Long Beach, Minneapolis, Oakland, Philadelphia, Pittsburgh, Portland (Maine), Portland (Oregon), San Diego, San Francisco, Seattle, Washington, DC, and West Hollywood. In Canada, dyke marches can be found in Calgary, Halifax, Montreal, Ottawa, Toronto, Vancouver, and Winnipeg. In Europe, dyke marches take place in various cities, including Berlin, Dublin, London, Stockholm, and Helsinki. The first Latin American dyke march was held in Mexico City in 2003.

== History ==
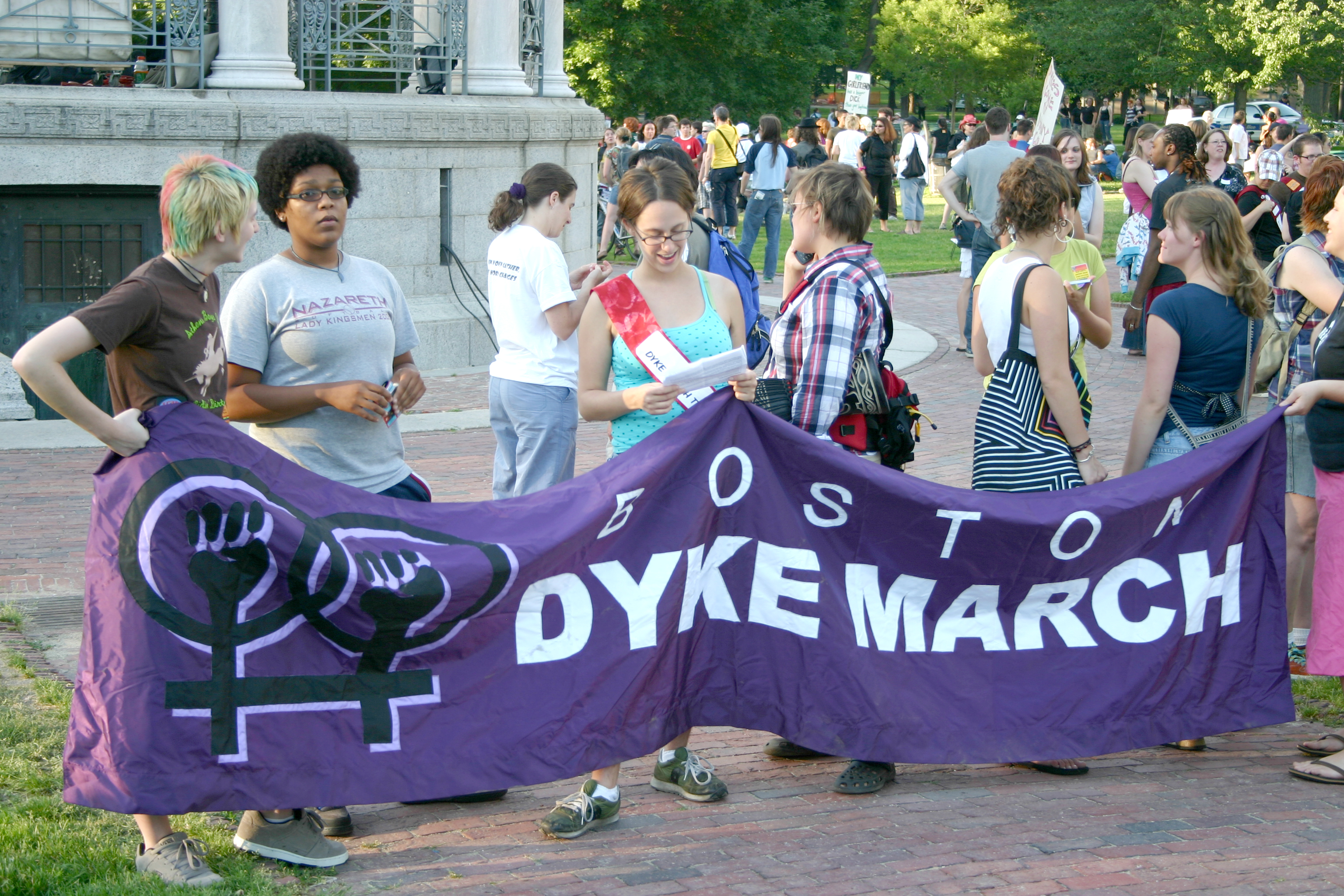
Boston Dyke March, 2008

Before the concept of a "dyke march" came to be, one of the first documented lesbian pride marches in North America took place in Vancouver, British Columbia, Canada, in May 1981. Approximately 200 lesbians attending the fifth Bi-National Lesbian Conference marched through downtown streets chanting "Look over here, look over there, lesbians are everywhere!"

Later, in October 1981, the now-defunct organization Lesbians Against the Right held a "Dykes in the Streets" march in Toronto, Ontario, with lesbian power, pride, and visibility as the theme. 350 women participated in this demonstration. Another similar demonstration would not be held again in Toronto until 1996.

The first conceptualized and self-proclaimed dyke march was formed in Washington, DC, during the March on Washington for Lesbian, Gay and Bi Equal Rights and Liberation. Organized by the Lesbian Avengers, over 20,000 women participated in the march on April 24, 1993. Due to the successful turnout of this first march, the New York Lesbian Avengers decided to organize a march of their own held in June 1993. Beyond marching throughout the city, a manifesto was handed out and the Avengers created a “float”: a bed on wheels full of kissing dykes. A banner, which is used every year to demarcate the front of the March, was improvised at Bryant Park with markers and oaktag. Around the same time that year, Atlanta and San Francisco also held their first dyke marches.

Most dyke marches today occur in late June during Pride celebrations commemorating the Stonewall riots in New York City on June 28, 1969.

== Importance to community ==
The first Dyke March held in April 1993 in Washington D.C. was accompanied with a manifesto crafted by the Lesbian Avengers. The purpose of the flyer was to address the necessity for grassroots lesbian organizing, especially given the anti-gay bills being pushed throughout the early 1990s. After learning about this manifesto, lesbians from Los Angeles created a large banner for their contingent, and those from Philadelphia constructed a vagina statue that was carried through the streets of Washington D.C.

An excerpt from this call to action within the lesbian community reads:

Calling All Lesbians! Wake Up! It's Time To Get Out Of The Beds, Out Of The Bars And Into The Streets. It's Time To Seize The Power of Dyke Love, Dyke Vision, Dyke Anger, Dyke Intelligence, Dyke Strategy....We're Invisible, Sisters, And It's Not Safe—Not In Our Homes, Not In The Streets, Not On The Job, Not In The Courts. Where Are The Out Lesbian Leaders? It's Time For A Fierce Lesbian Movement And That's You: The Role Model, The Vision, The Desire.

=== Lack of recognition by media ===
After the second annual Dyke March in New York City on June 25, 1994, there was a lack of media coverage of the event in spite of attendance numbers reaching 20,000. The New York Times was the only major newspaper that published a mention, albeit brief, about the march. The Lesbian Avengers perceived the overall silence to be a "media blackout", resulting in an aggressive media campaign.

Concurrent with the international march on the United Nations on June 26, 1994, commemorating the 25th anniversary of the Stonewall uprising, the Gay and Lesbian Alliance Against Defamation (GLAAD) issued a press release about Stonewall that failed to recognize the existence of the Dyke March. The Lesbian Avengers confronted the organization about this oversight, and GLAAD re-issued the press release with the addition of a sentence acknowledging the absence of mainstream media coverage about the march.

== International Dyke march events ==
=== Europe ===
==== Germany ====
Dyke March, Berlin, Germany, 2018

As of 2023, there are dyke marches in more than twenty cities and regions in Germany. The nationwide network of "Dyke* March Germany" is gathering information on all of the dyke marches in Germany on their Instagram account.

There is a yearly dyke march in Hamburg and since 2014 in Cologne, Germany. Since 2017 also in Heidelberg, and since 2018 in Nuremberg and Oldenburg.

The Berlin Dyke March has been in operation since 2013 in the LGBT-friendly neighborhood of Kreuzberg. Historically, the march occurs annually in June, on the day before the Berlin Pride Parade.

As of 2025, there are dyke marches planned throughout the year in Berlin, Bielefeld, Braunschweig, Frankfurt, Hamburg, Hannover, Köln, Lüneburg, Nürnberg, Oldenburg, Rhein-Neckar, the Ruhr area (three dyke marches each year), Weimar, and Würzburg.

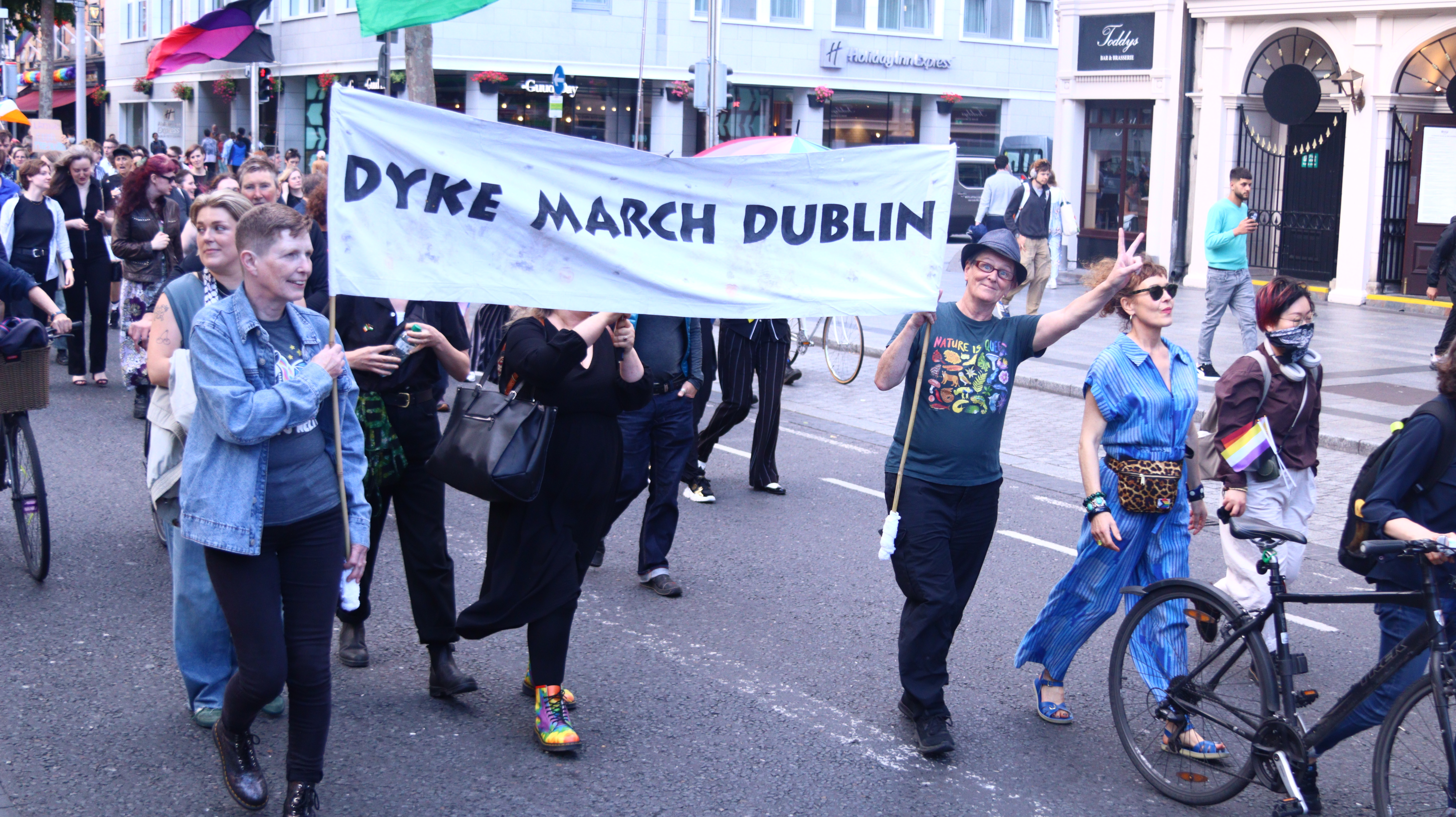
Dublin Dyke March, 2025 Participants holding white banner with text "Dyke March Dublin" This banner was originally used at the first Dyke March in Dublin in 1998.

==== Republic of Ireland ====
The first Dyke March in the Republic of Ireland took place on Friday 26 June, 1998. The March claimed to be the second International Dyke March, and was supported by the New York City Lesbian Avengers drummers band. The theme of the march was 'Lust for Power" and emphasised the power and force within lesbian sexuality. The march was a success to the organisers in Ireland, with more than 300 people attending. The march started at the Garden of Remembrance and finished with a rally at the Central Bank, followed by a night out at the Tivoli Theatre. A short documentary was made by Linda Cullen about the march and was shown at the International Gay and Lesbian Film Festival in 1998.

Dublin held its second Dyke March in 1999, however this would be the last Dyke March in the city for 26 years.

In 2025, Dyke March returned to Dublin with thousands marching along a similar route to the original 1998 march. The theme was "Space" and focused on the lack of lesbian spaces across the island of Ireland, the housing crisis for all, exclusionary practices in LGBTQ+ spaces towards trans and non-binary people, and the war in Gaza. The march and subsequent rally focused on the rights for all people across the world to live freely without threat of violence or militaristic action.

==== United Kingdom ====
The London Dyke March was first organized in 2012 and is held each year in June. The 2014 march featured speakers, including Sarah Brown, a transgender lesbian activist and former Lib Dem councilor. The London Dyke March emphasizes diversity, including bois, queers, femmes, butches, and lipstick lesbians.

==== France ====
In France, the first non-mixed march was organized by the "Lesbians of Jussieu" group[7] on June 21, 1980. It would take more than thirty years for another lesbian march to take place, during EuroLesboPride in Marseille in 2013.

Eight years later, in April 2021, lesbian marches were held in Paris (and several other French cities). At the initiative of the Collages Lesbiens collective, the event brought together more than 10,000 people in Paris. The demonstrators took the opportunity to demand access to medically assisted procreation.PMA. Several famous lesbian activists, such as Adèle Haenel, Céline Sciamma, and Alice Coffin, participated in the procession. The event is being held again in April 2022, in Paris but also, for the first time, in Lyon. New editions took place in Paris in 2023 on April 23 at the initiative of the association Fièr.e.s, in 2024 on May 4 with the associations and collectives Les Inverti.e.s, Féministes révolutionnaires, Collectif Queer Racisé.e.s Autonomes, Queer education and Diivines and in 2025 on April 26 with the associations and collectives Diivines, Féministes révolutionnaires, Label Gouine, Front Transfem, Queer Education, Bi Pan Paris, Front Bisexuel, the Trans Solidarity Organization, Toutes des femmes, OUT Trans, Collectif Insurrection Trans.

==== Netherlands ====
Amsterdam saw the launch of its first Dyke March in 2022, as a response to the increasing depoliticization of mainstream Pride events. Organized independently of the city's canal parade, the 2025 march took place on July 5.

==== Italy ====
Rome hosted its first-ever Dyke March on April 26, 2025. The march was staged in conjunction with the 4th EuroCentralAsian Lesbian* Conference.

==== Belgium ====
Brussels had never hosted a Dyke March until 2025. The first-ever Dyke* March Brussels is set to take place on May 16. The manifesto called for lesbian visibility and grassroots organizing.

=== Latin America ===
==== Mexico ====
The first Latin America demonstration of a dyke march was held in Mexico City on March 21, 2003. This march extended from the symbolic Monument to the Revolution to the Zócalo, the capital's huge central plaza. Organizers state "For us, the Lesbian March is an important show of visibility because it aims at smashing stereotypes and prejudices."

=== North America ===
==== United States ====
===== Asbury Park, New Jersey =====
The inaugural Asbury Park Dyke March was held in October 2020. The march took place in the absence of the annual Jersey Pride parade and festival, cancelled that year due to the COVID-19 pandemic.

===== Boston =====
The first Boston Dyke March was held in 1995, with the goal of "offering a non-commercial, intersectional, and fundamentally grassroots alternative to Boston’s Pride celebration." At this inaugural march, the Boston Lesbian Avengers organized a fire-eating ritual to mourn the murders of Hattie Mae Cohens and Brian Mock. The ritual has since become an annual tradition at the Boston marches.

===== Chicago =====
The Chicago Dyke March is held in the month of June and has been in operation since 1996, beginning in the Lakeview neighborhood. In 1997, the march moved to LGBT-friendly neighborhood of Andersonville. One person told Time Out (magazine) that the march was "a chance to celebrate ourselves as women, as lesbians, and to show the community that we are here."

In 2008, organizers of the Chicago Dyke March announced that it would remain in a new location for two consecutive years. The location of the march changed every two to three years to increase visibility throughout all neighborhoods of Chicago, in addition to increasing inclusiveness and accessibility. The March was held in Pilsen in 2008 and 2009, in South Shore in 2010 and 2011, in Uptown in 2012 and 2013, in Humboldt Park in 2014, 2015 and 2016, and in La Villita in 2017.

===== New York =====
19th NYC Dyke March, New York, US, 2011

Organized by the New York Lesbian Avengers, the first New York City Dyke March was held in June 1993. The Second Annual New York City Dyke March was held in June 1994 and led to the solidification and continuation of the yearly NYC Dyke March. The march is open to everyone who identifies as a "dyke".

As with the San Francisco Dyke March, the organizers do not seek out a permit, and put an emphasis on the political. Any person who identifies as a dyke is welcome to march regardless of gender expression or identity, sex assigned at birth, sexual orientation, race, age, political affiliation, religious identity, ability, class, or immigration status.

===== Portland, Maine =====
The Portland Dyke March has been held annually since 2005. Initially, the march was part of the larger Southern Maine Pride parade. Since 2006, however, the dyke march has been held as an independent event. The march usually starts from Monument Square and is led by the local Dykes on Bikes contingent.

===== San Francisco =====
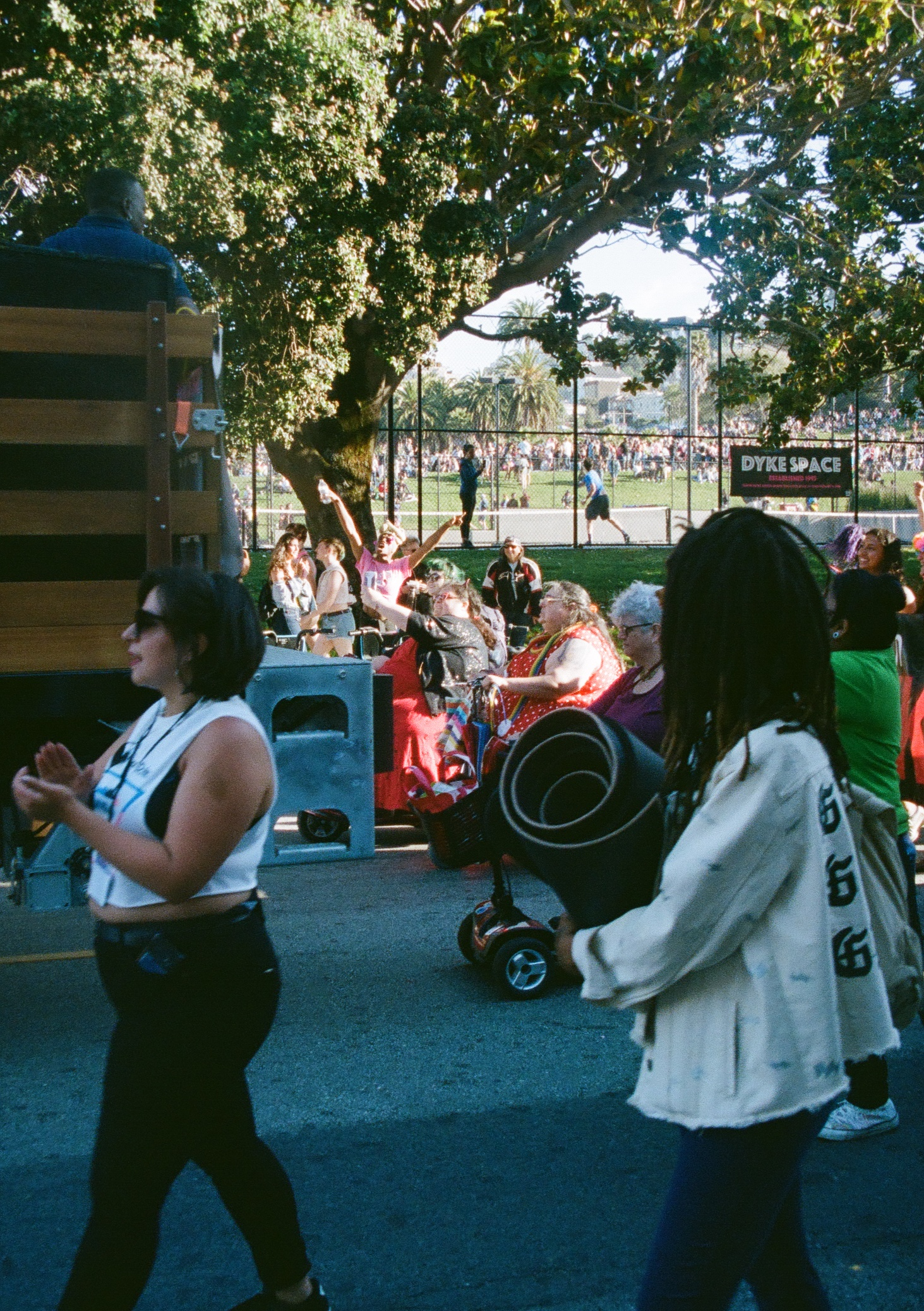
Front of dyke march parade, San Francisco, US, 2019

The first San Francisco Dyke March was held in June 1993, and is celebrated every year on the last Saturday in June. The march begins in Mission Dolores Park with speeches, performances, and community networking; and ends in the Castro District. The dyke march is informal, with marchers creating their own signs and most people showing up to participate, rather than to just watch. The San Francisco Dyke March has high attendance numbers.

In the early years, the San Francisco Dyke March Committee (a small group of volunteers) never applied for nor received a permit from the city, exercising the First Amendment right to gather without permits and often changed its route to avoid the police.

===== Seattle =====
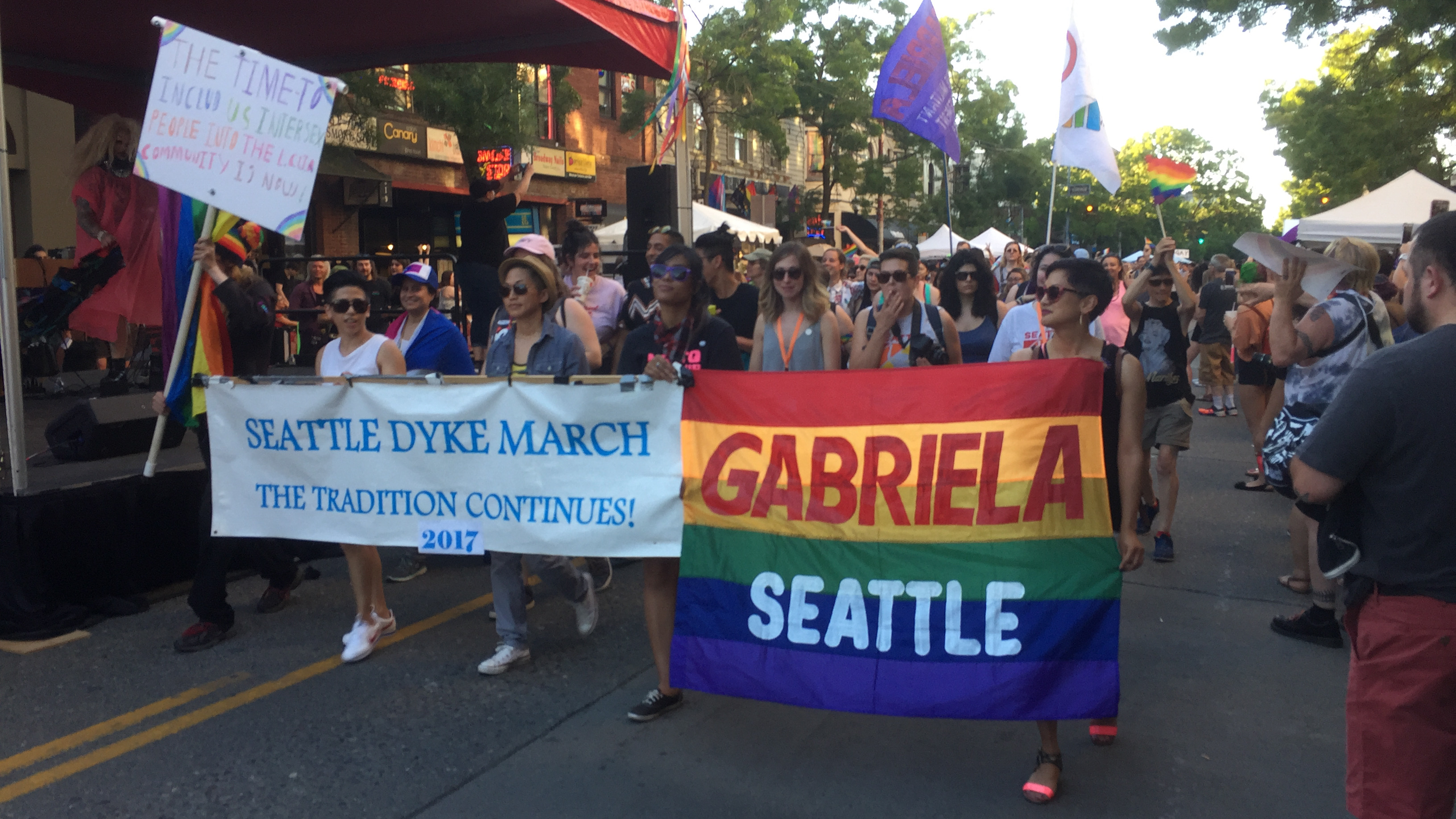
Dyke march at PrideFest, Seattle, US, 2017

Seattle's dyke march occurs the Saturday before Pride and begins with a Rally at 5 pm at Seattle Central Community College, followed by the march through the streets at 7 pm. The rally is held outdoors, includes speakers and performers who are women identified and queer identified, and is ASL interpreted. In 2023, the march switched from a permitted march to a non-permitted one. Dykes on Bikes stepped up in the wanted absence of the Seattle Police Department to provide route safety, like blocking intersections for pedestrians.

===== Washington, DC =====
The DC Dyke March was first organized in April 1993 and thereafter held annually in June until 2007. After a 12-year absence, the march returned in 2019 with "Dykes Against Displacement" as its theme, in protest of the elimination of low-income housing due to gentrification. The march, however, became mired in controversy resulting from the banning of "nationalist symbols".

== Incidents regarding Jewish pride flags and anti-Zionism ==
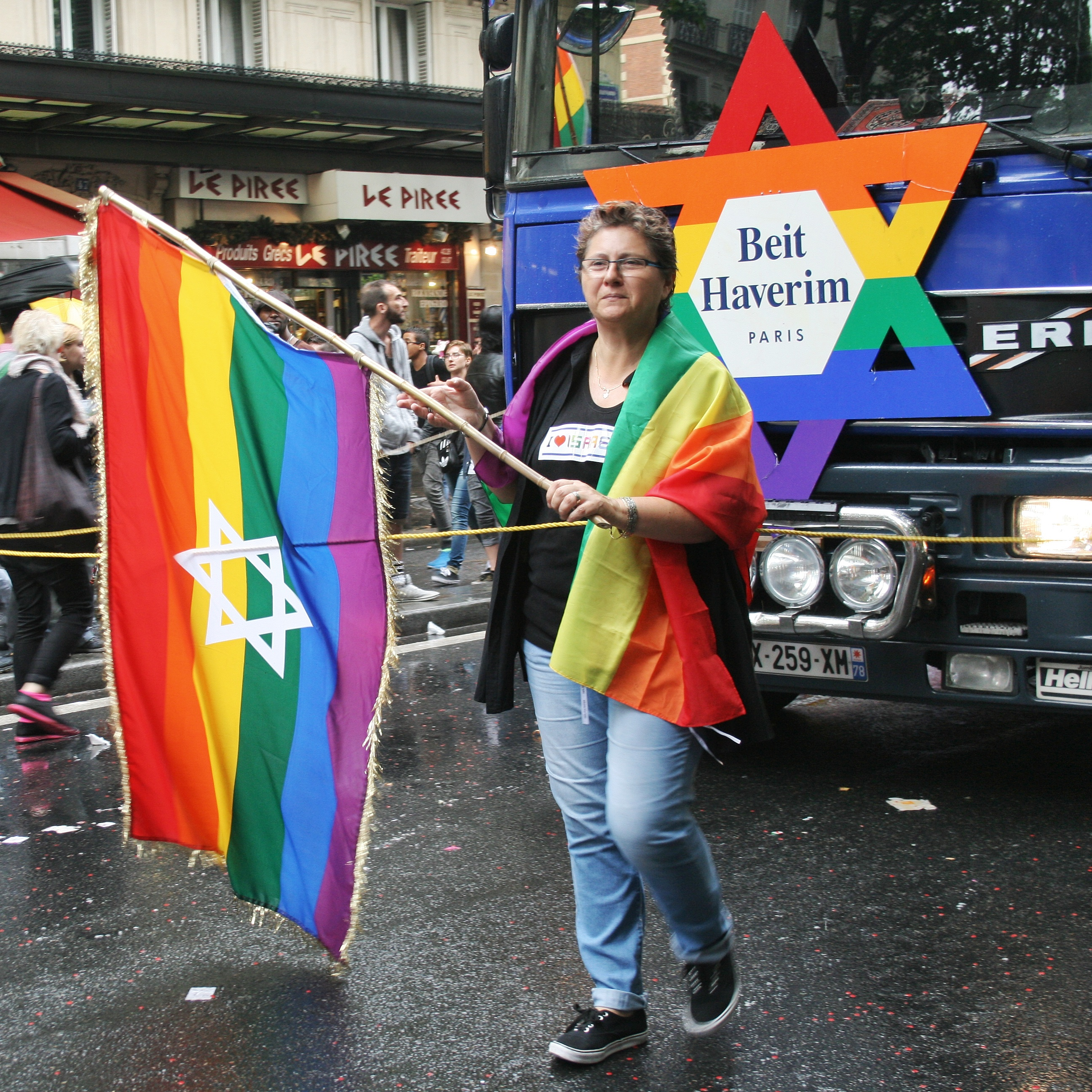
Jewish pride flag, Gay Pride parade, Paris, France (2014)

=== 2017 Chicago ===
In 2017, Chicago Dyke March (CDM) organizers singled out three women carrying Jewish pride flags and began questioning them on their political stance in regards to Zionism and Israel. After a discussion, organizers asked them to leave the event, insisting that the rainbow flag with the Star of David "made people feel unsafe" and that the dyke march was "pro-Palestinian and anti-Zionist". The incident prompted widespread criticism and accusations of anti-Semitism. A member of the Dyke March Chicago collective stated that the women were removed due to the flags, and pro-Palestinian organizations were asked by CDM to release statements of solidarity while they crafted an official statement. March organizers later released a statement maintaining that the women were asked to leave for "expressing Zionist views that go directly against the march’s anti-racist core values."

In 2018, members of the local Jewish LGBT community expressed reluctance to attend that year's march, citing concerns about safety and alienation.

In 2021, an Instagram post from the CDM organizers included the American and Israeli flags burning. The post was later deleted and replaced with a new image that shrouded both flags in flames.

=== 2019 Washington, DC ===
Similar to the 2017 decision made by the Chicago Dyke March, the 2019 Washington DC Dyke March adopted a policy that "nationalist symbols", including Israeli and American flags and the Star of David when centered on a flag, cannot be displayed. Organizers said these symbols represent "violent nationalism", and said those attending the event should "not bring pro-Israel paraphernalia in solidarity with our queer Palestinian friends", while "Jewish stars and other identifications and celebrations of Jewishness (yarmulkes, talit, other expressions of Judaism or Jewishness) are welcome and encouraged". Palestinian flags and symbols were permitted.

In response to the policy, Anti-Defamation League CEO Jonathan Greenblatt stated, "It is outrageous that in preparing to celebrate LGBTQ pride, the DC Dyke March is forbidding Jewish participants from carrying any flag or sign that includes the Star of David, which is universally recognized as a symbol of the Jewish people....Banning the Star of David in their parade is anti-Semitic, plain and simple." A coalition of progressive Jewish-American groups denounced the ban in a joint statement, and the National LGBTQ Task Force withdrew their support for the DC Dyke March.

More than two dozen Jewish lesbians and Zionist supporters brought the prohibited flag and symbol to the march. They debated the perceived mistreatment and exclusion with march organizer Jill Raney. Thereafter, DC Dyke March organizers allowed the group to participate in the march with their Jewish pride flags.

=== 2024 New York City ===
A marcher expresses support for Palestine at NYC Dyke March 2024

On June 27, 2024, the NYC Dyke March issued a statement supporting the safety of Jewish participants at the march and condemning the 7 October attacks. Within thirty minutes, this statement was deleted and replaced by another that referred to the first as a "mistake" that did "not reflect the official stance of the Dyke March", adding that the organization "unapologetically stands in support of Palestinian liberation". The march also raised money for the hardline anti-Zionist group Within Our Lifetime. In opposition, a group of Jewish dykes held a separate event at the same time as the march.

== Gallery of dyke marches ==
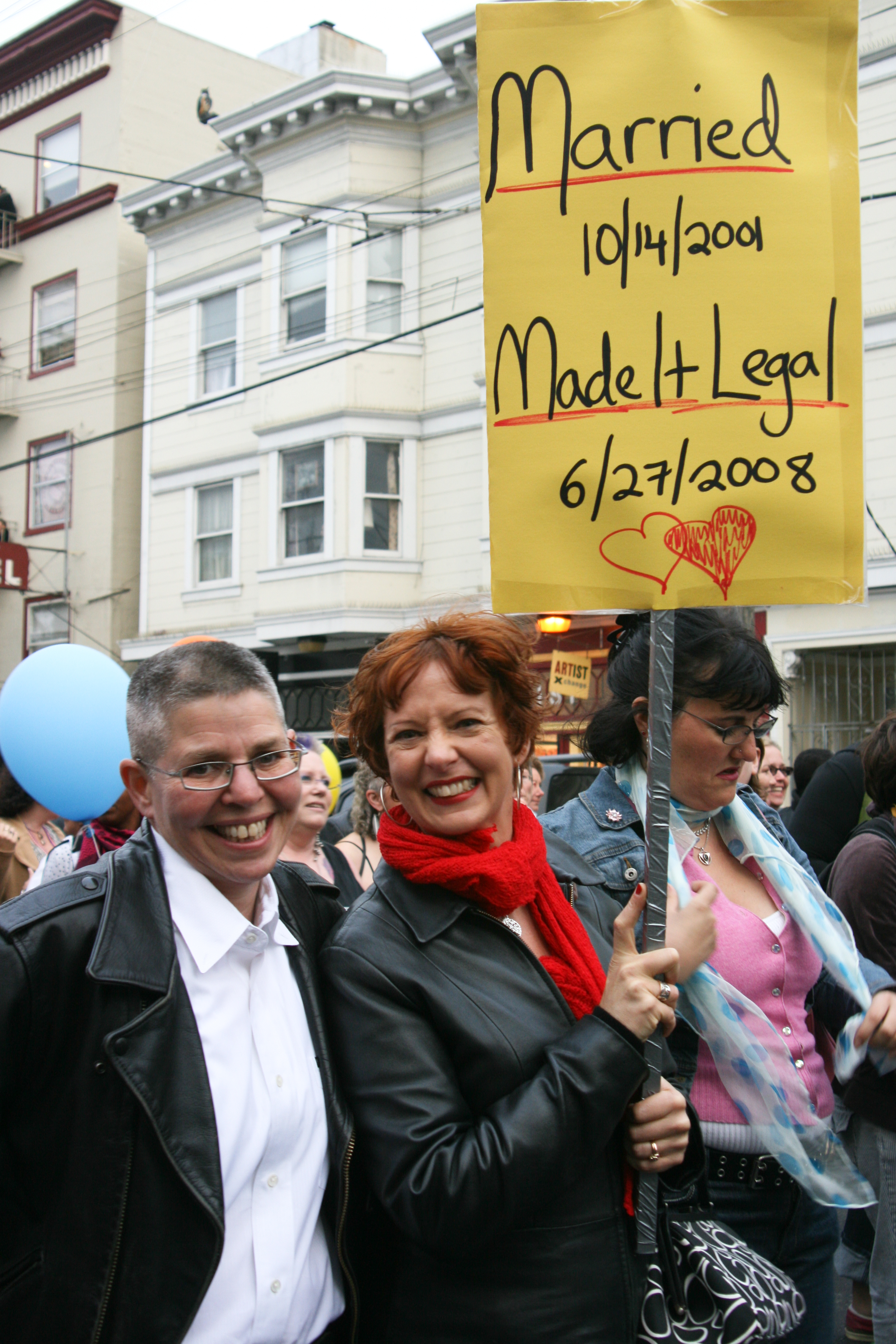
United States, San Francisco, 2008, dyke march participants

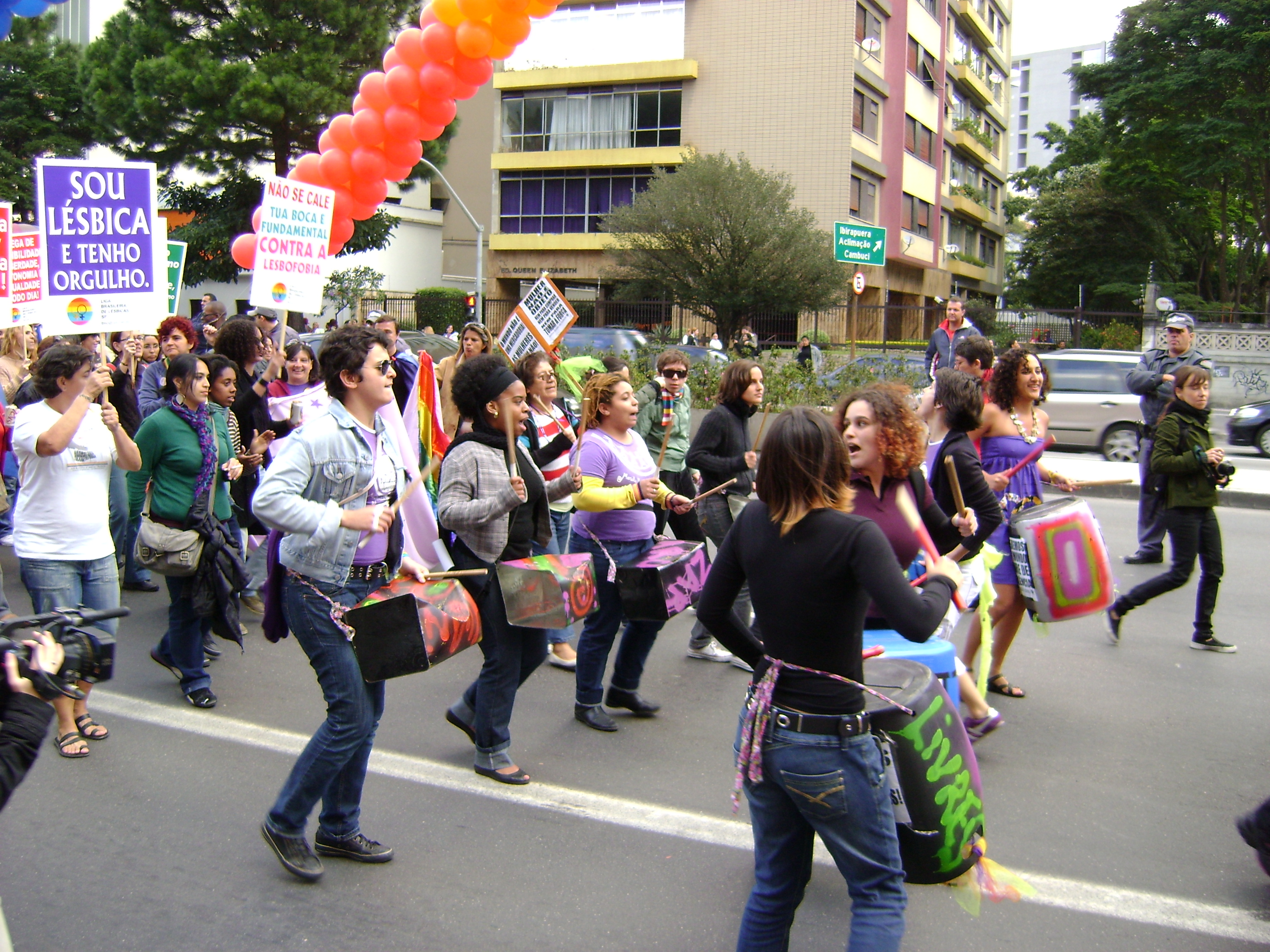
Brazil, São Paulo, 2009, lesbian walk

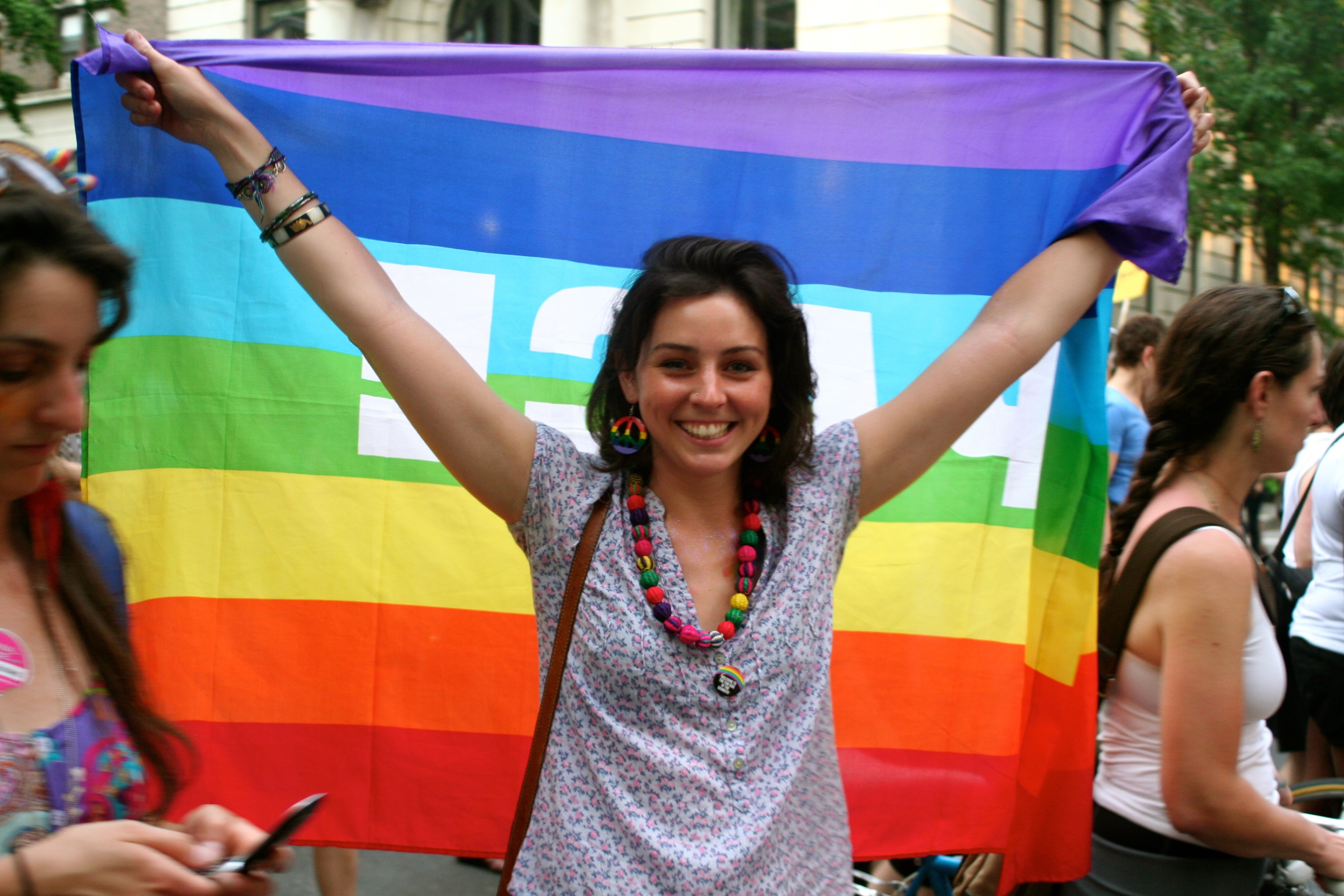
United States, New York City, 2011, dyke march participant

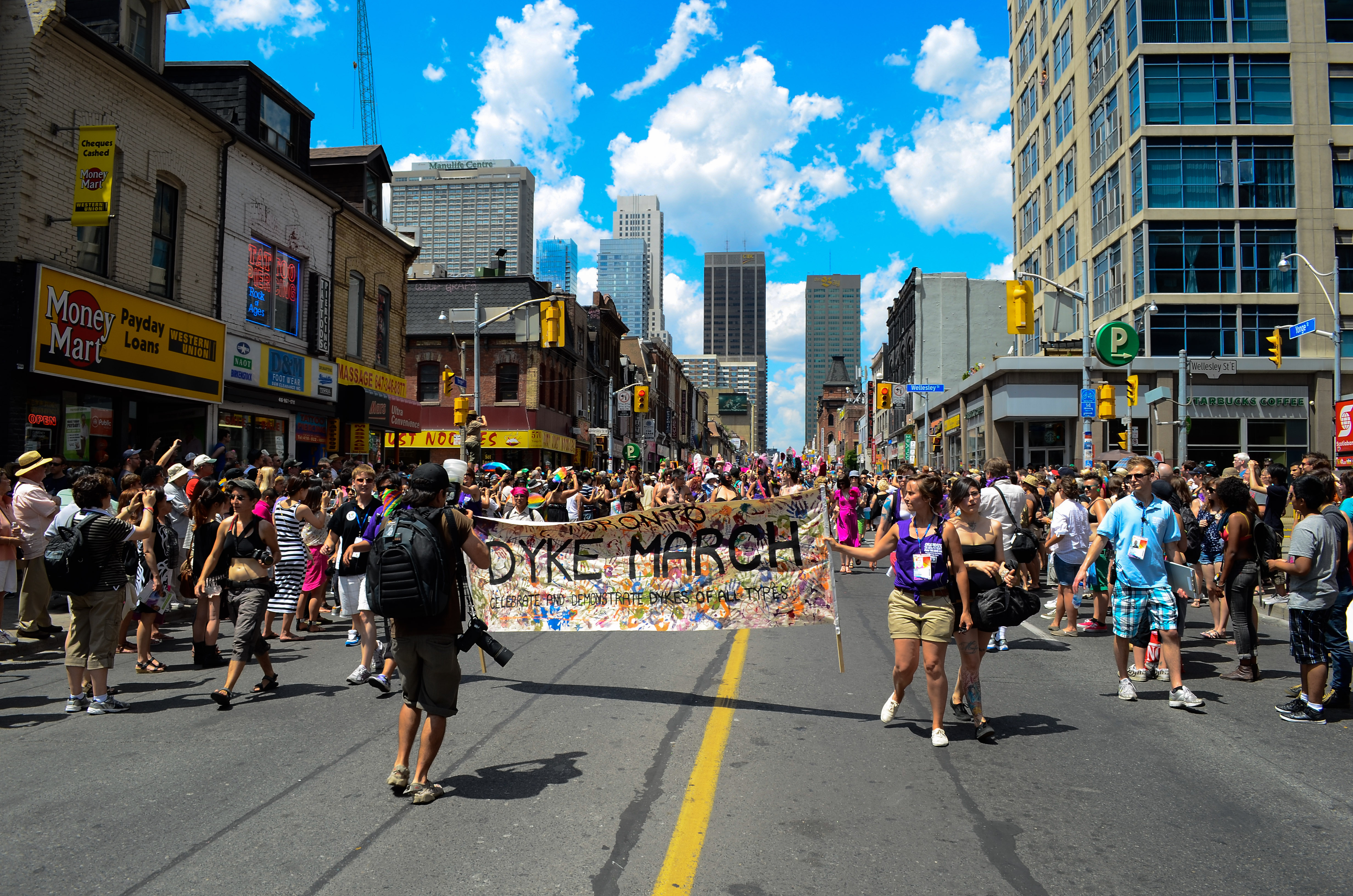
Canada, Toronto, 2012

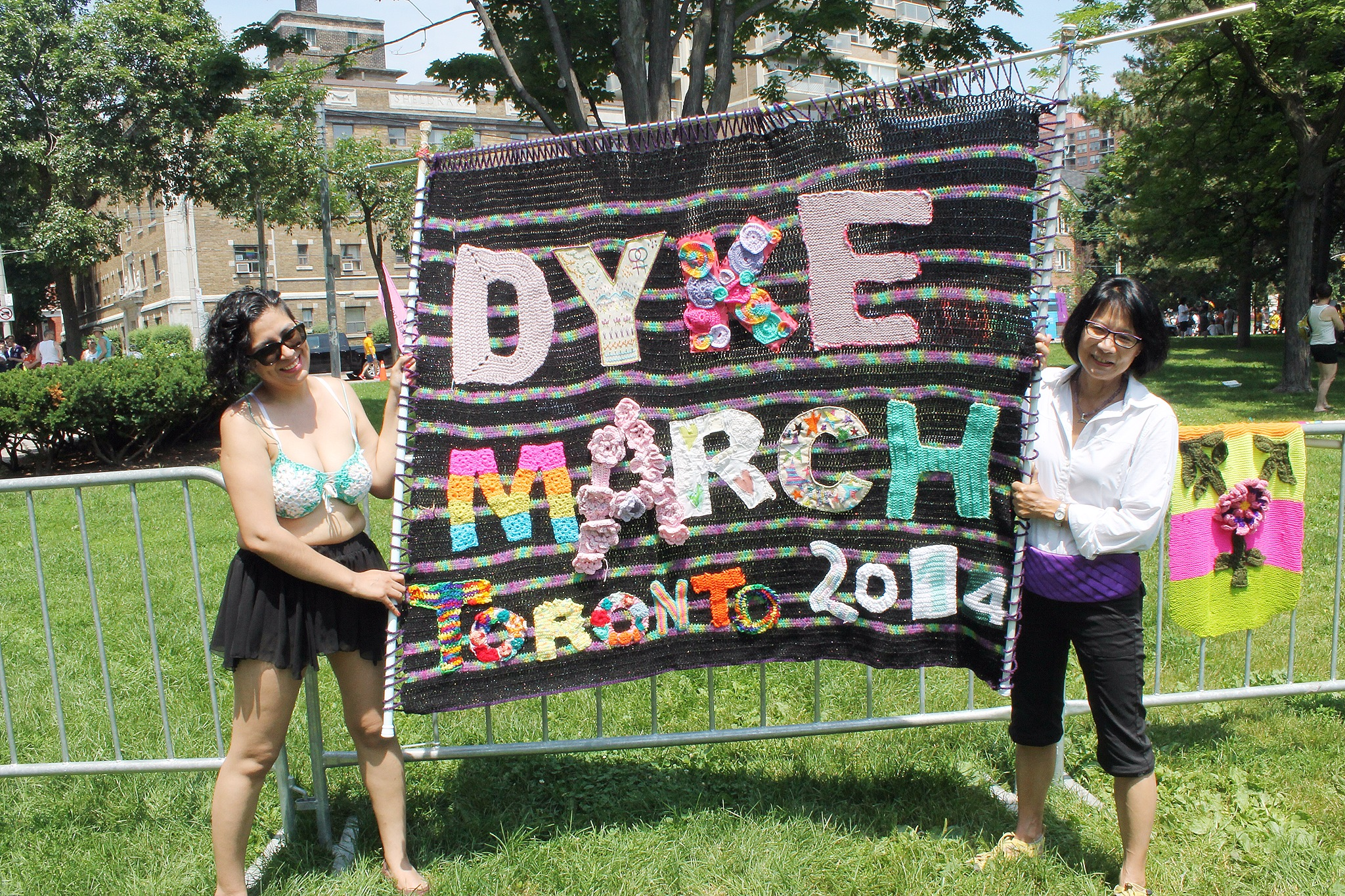
Canada, Toronto, 2014, at WorldPride

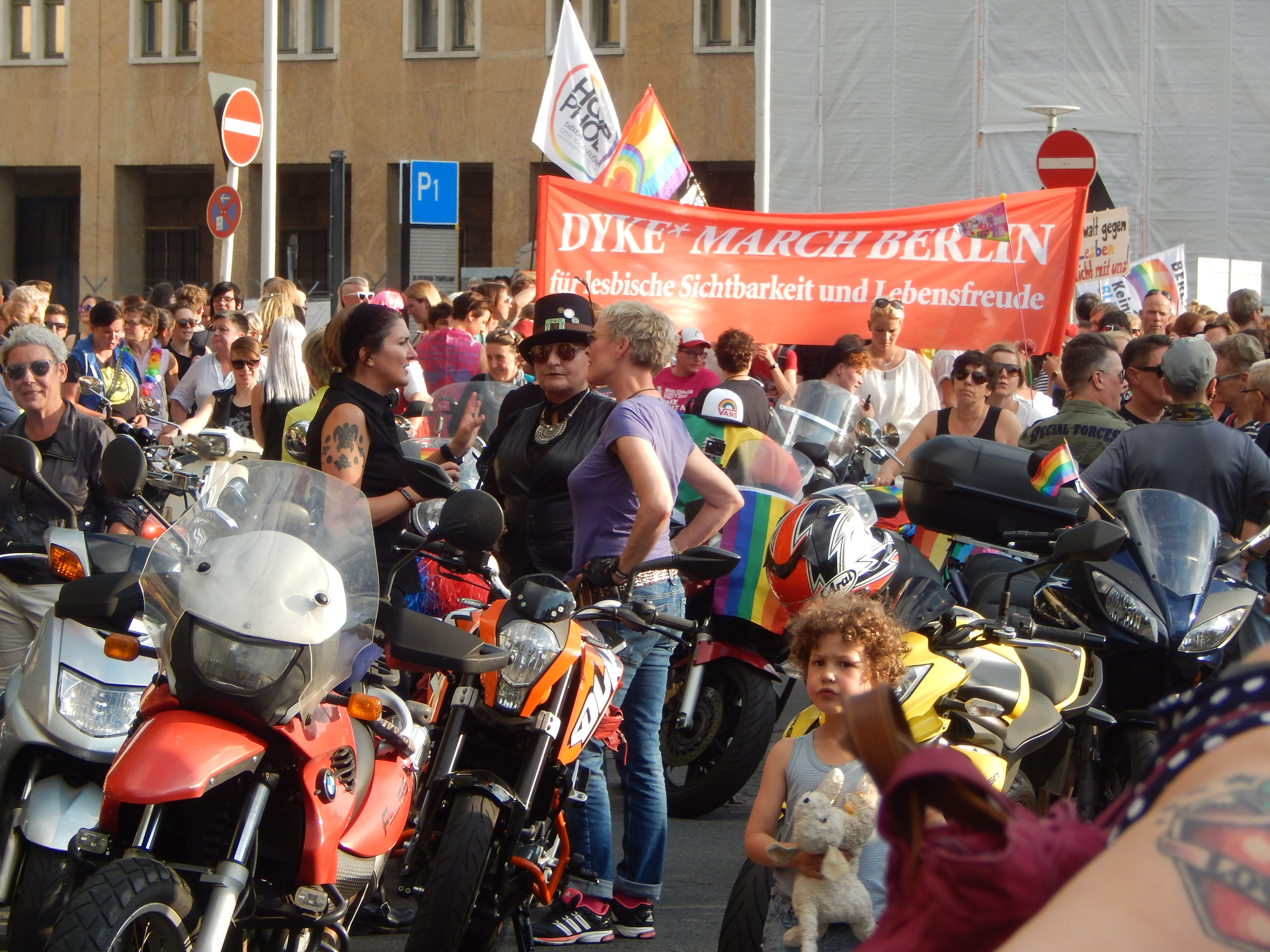
Germany, Berlin, 2017, Dykes on Bikes led dyke march

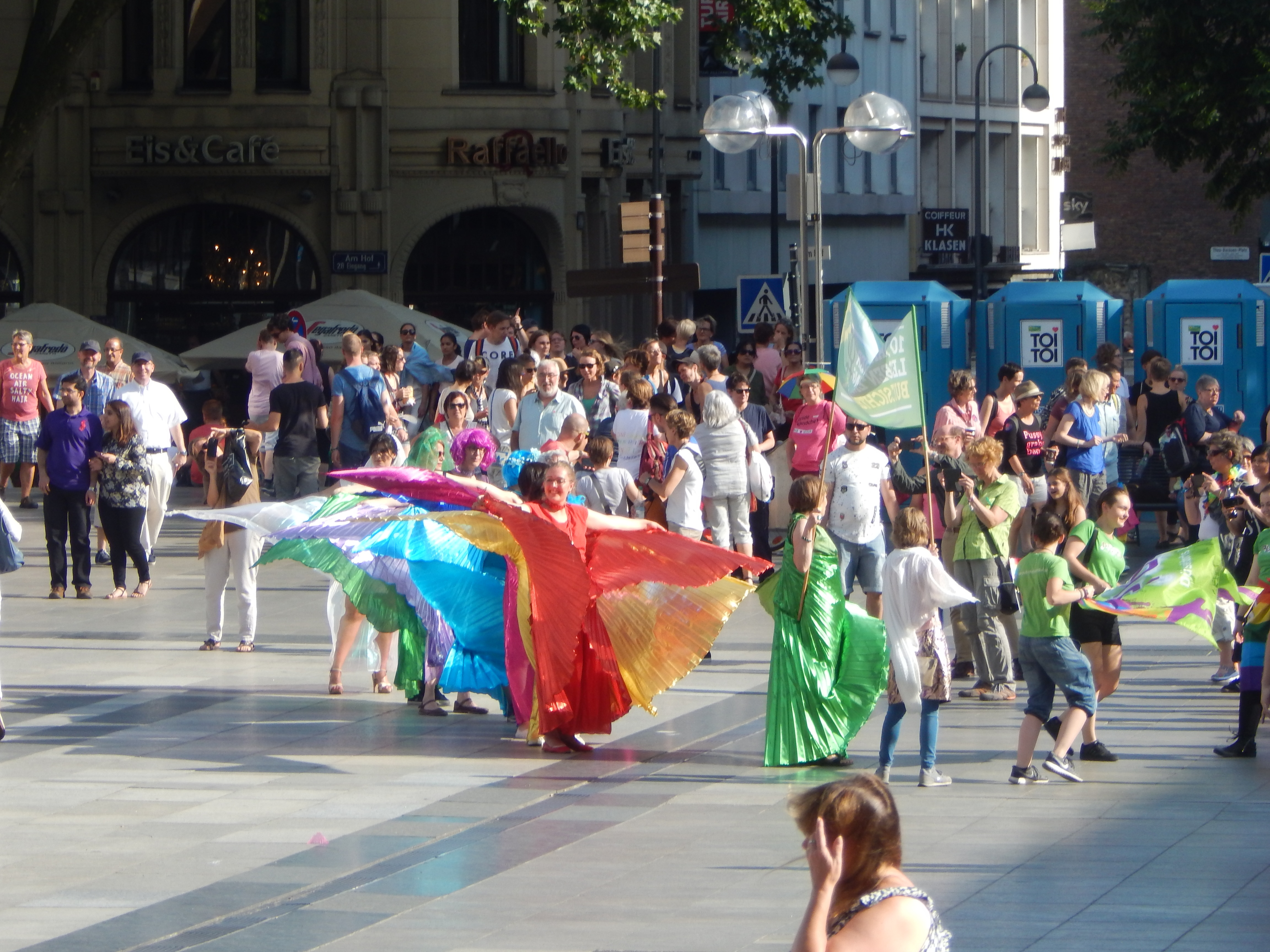
Germany, Cologne, 2017, dyke march

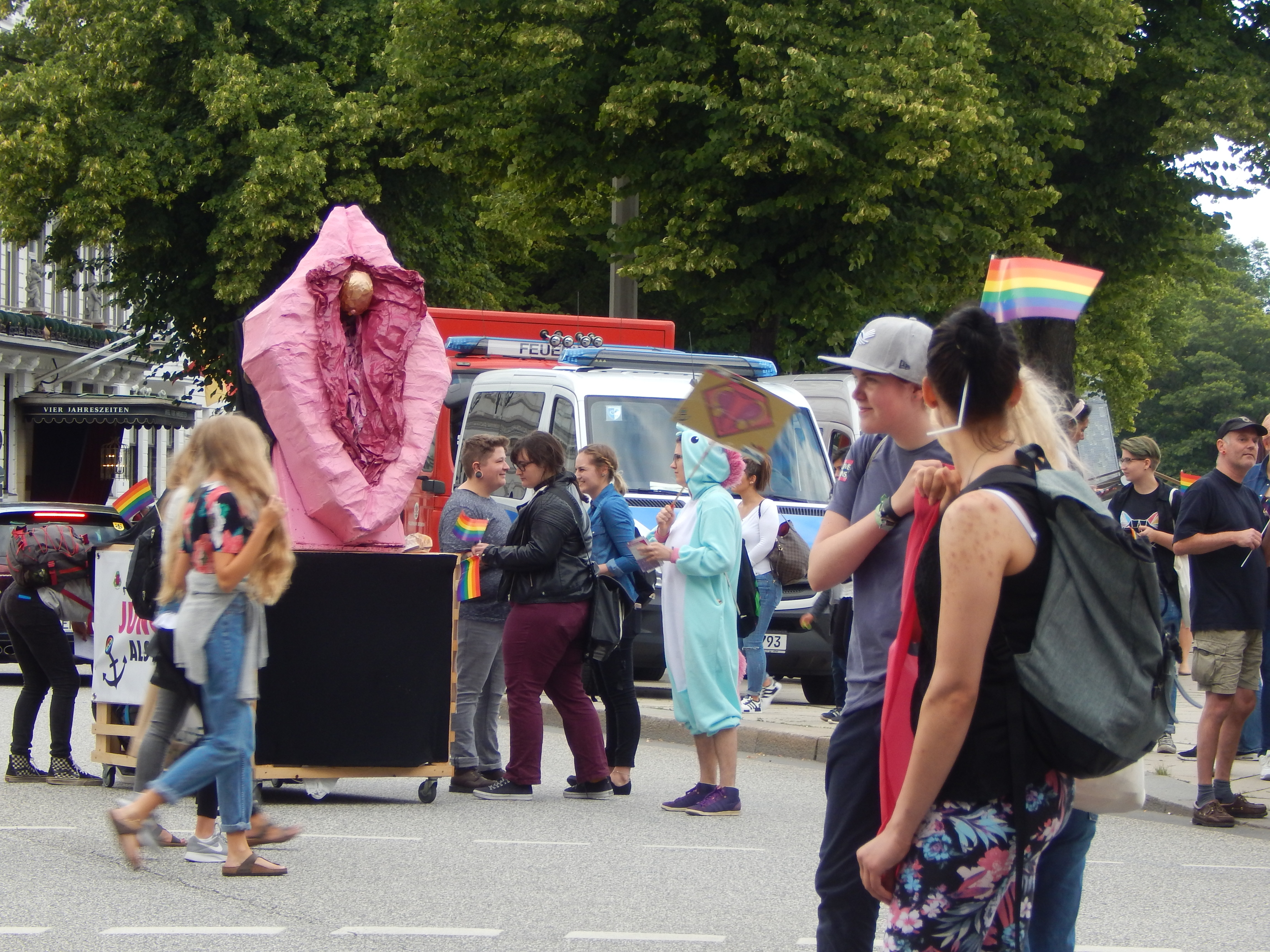
Germany, Hamburg, 2017, dyke march

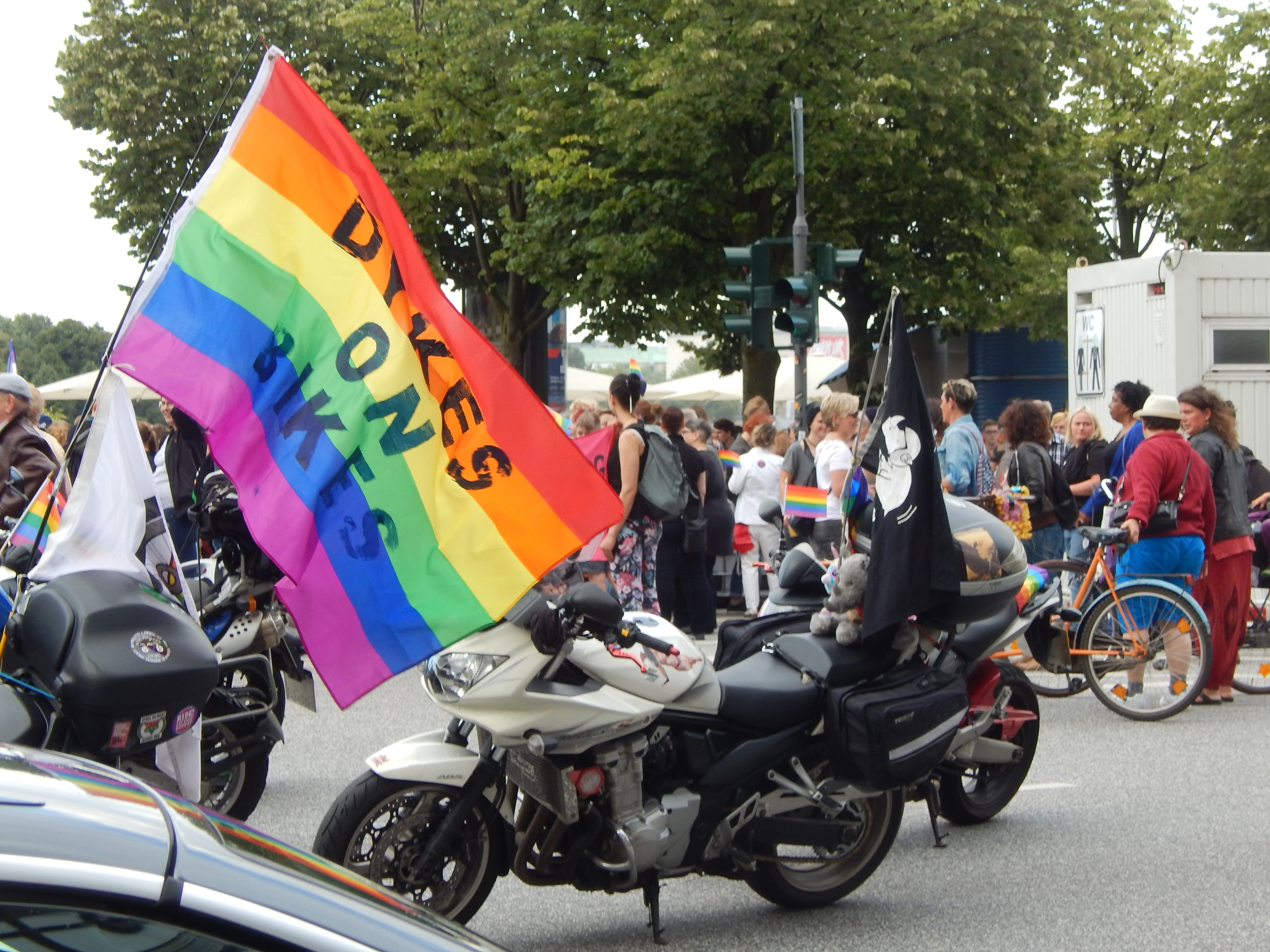
Germany, Hamburg, 2017, Dykes on Bikes led pride parade

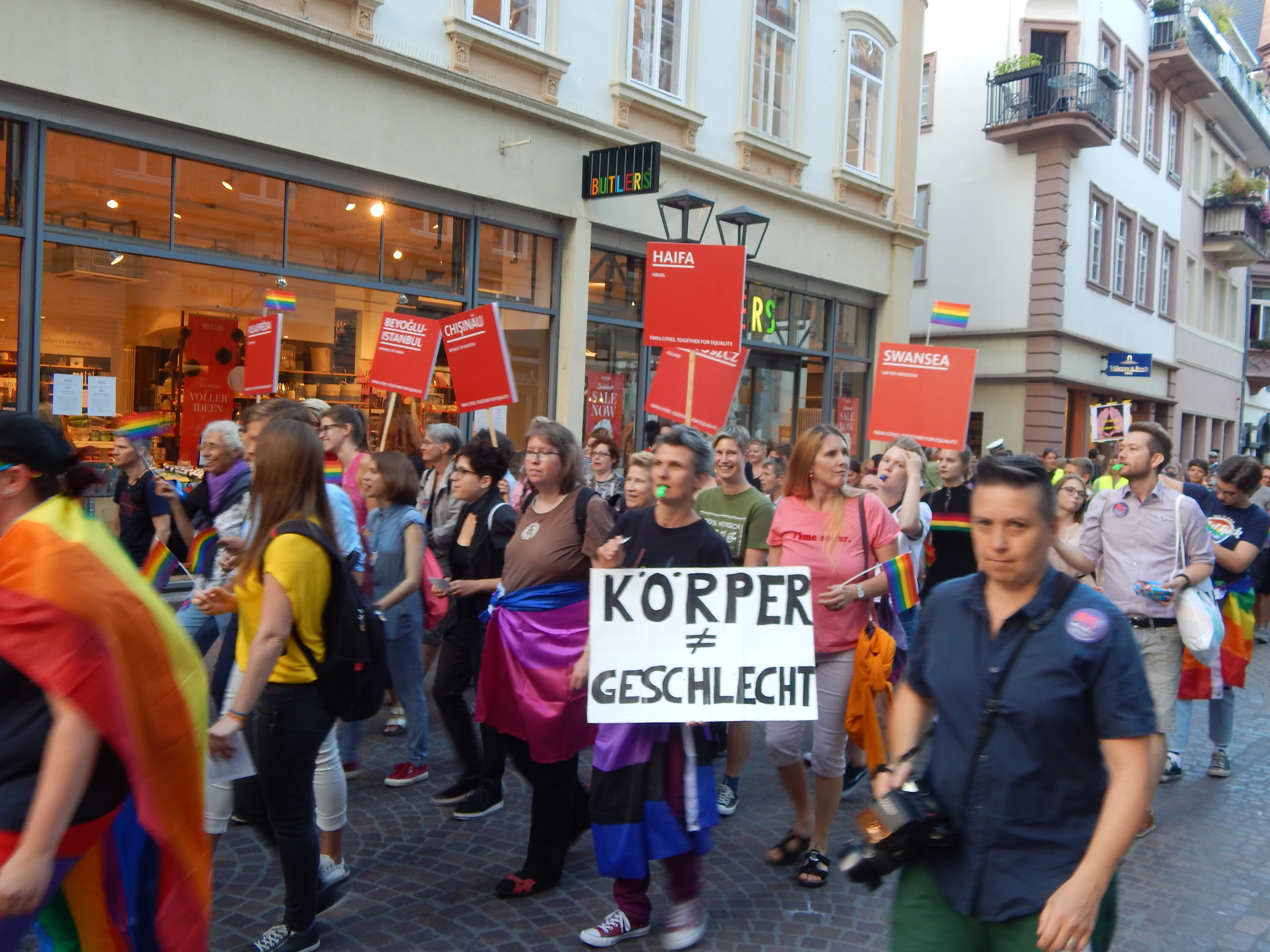
Germany, Heidelberg, 2018, dyke march

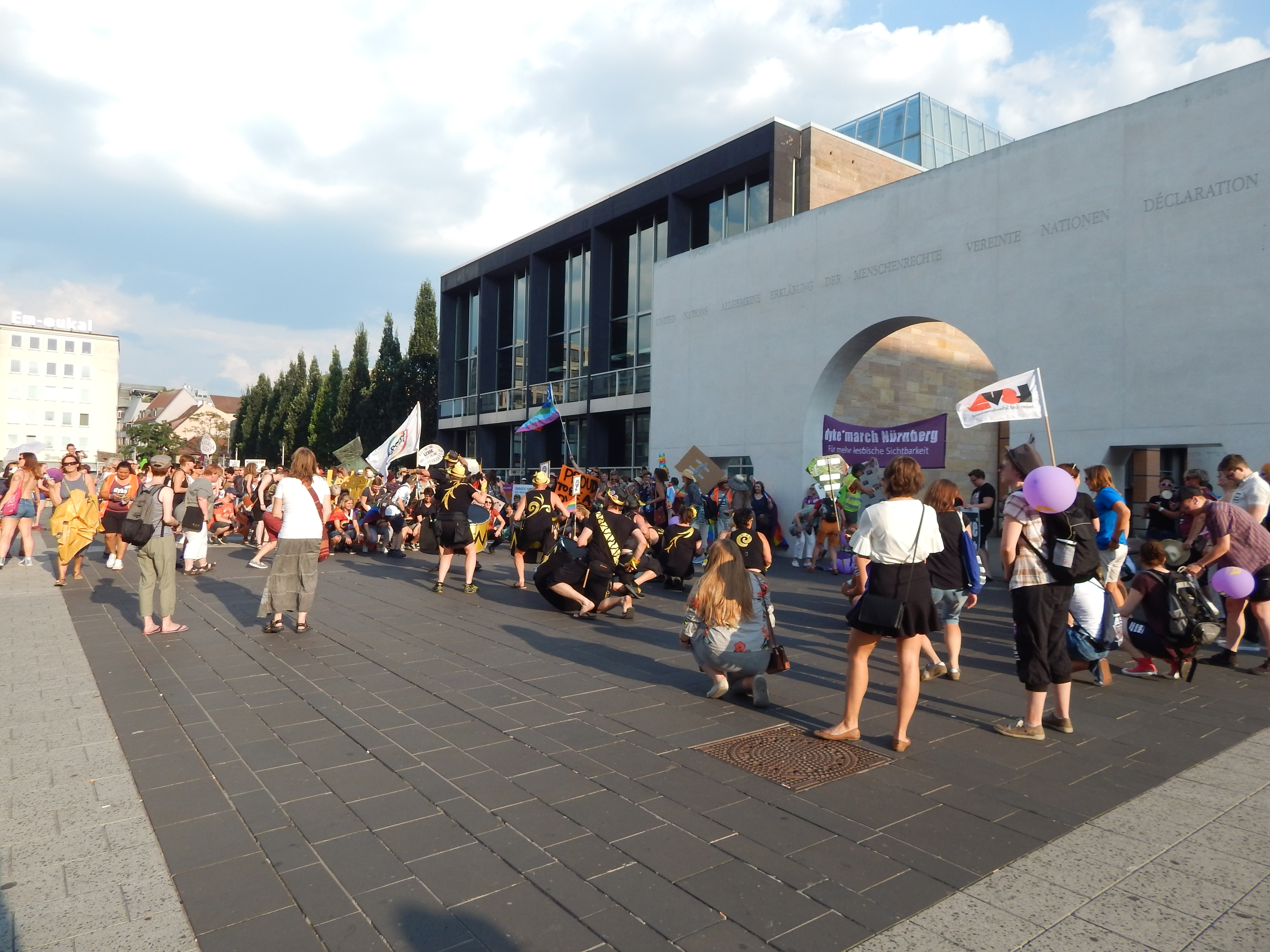
Germany, Nürnberg, 2018

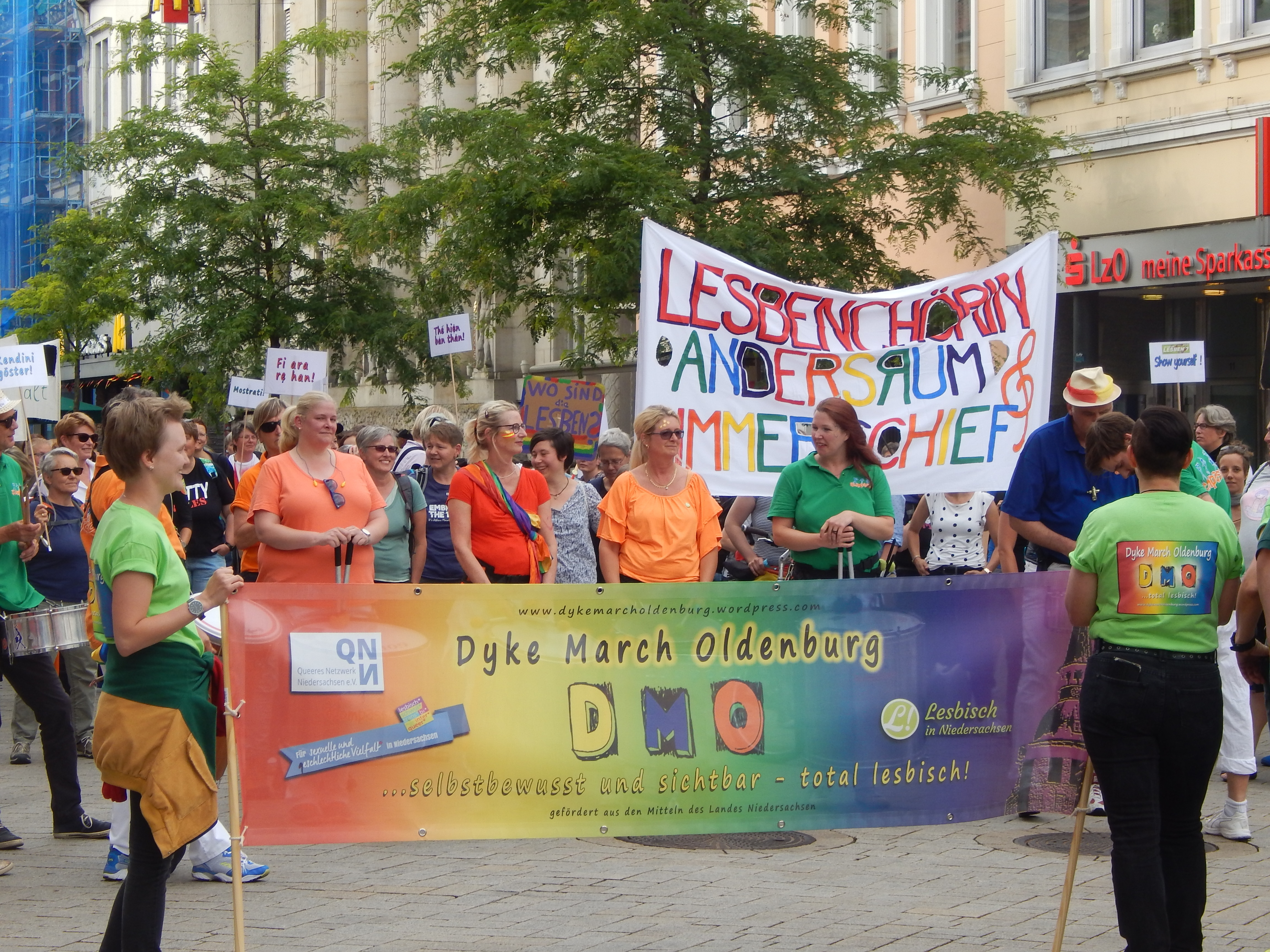
Germany, Oldenburg, 2018

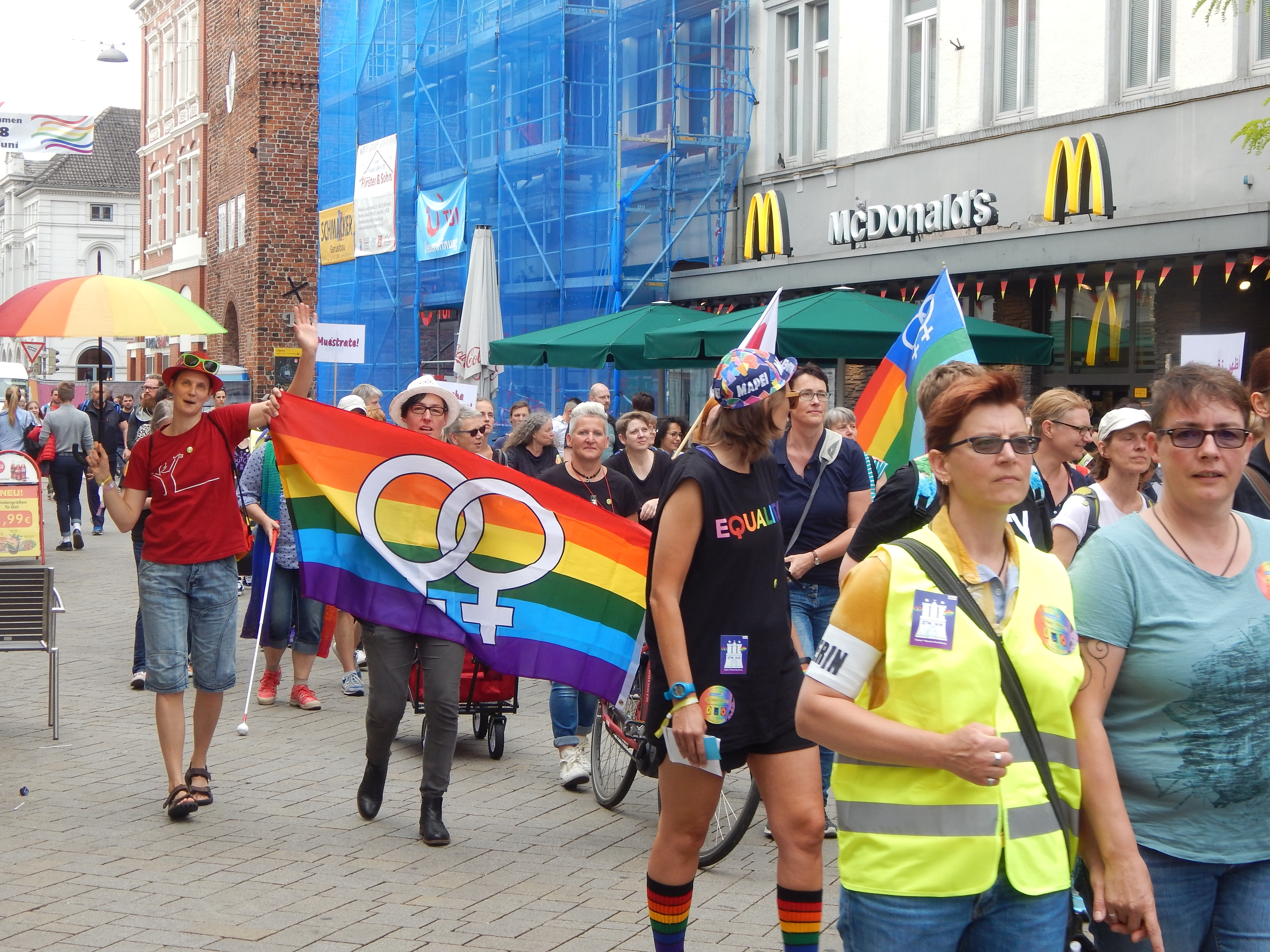
Germany, Oldenburg, 2018, dyke march

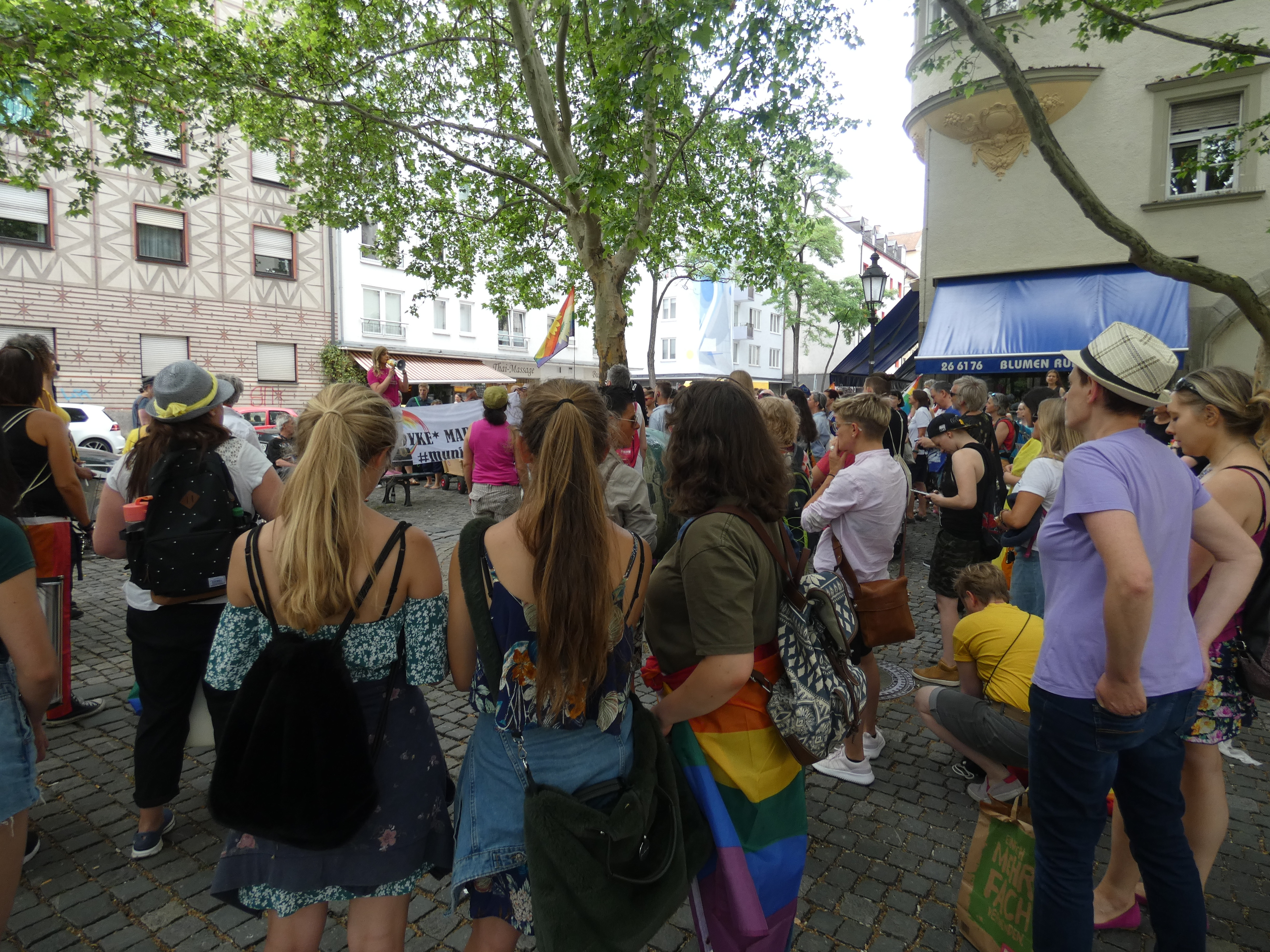
Germany, Munich, 2019

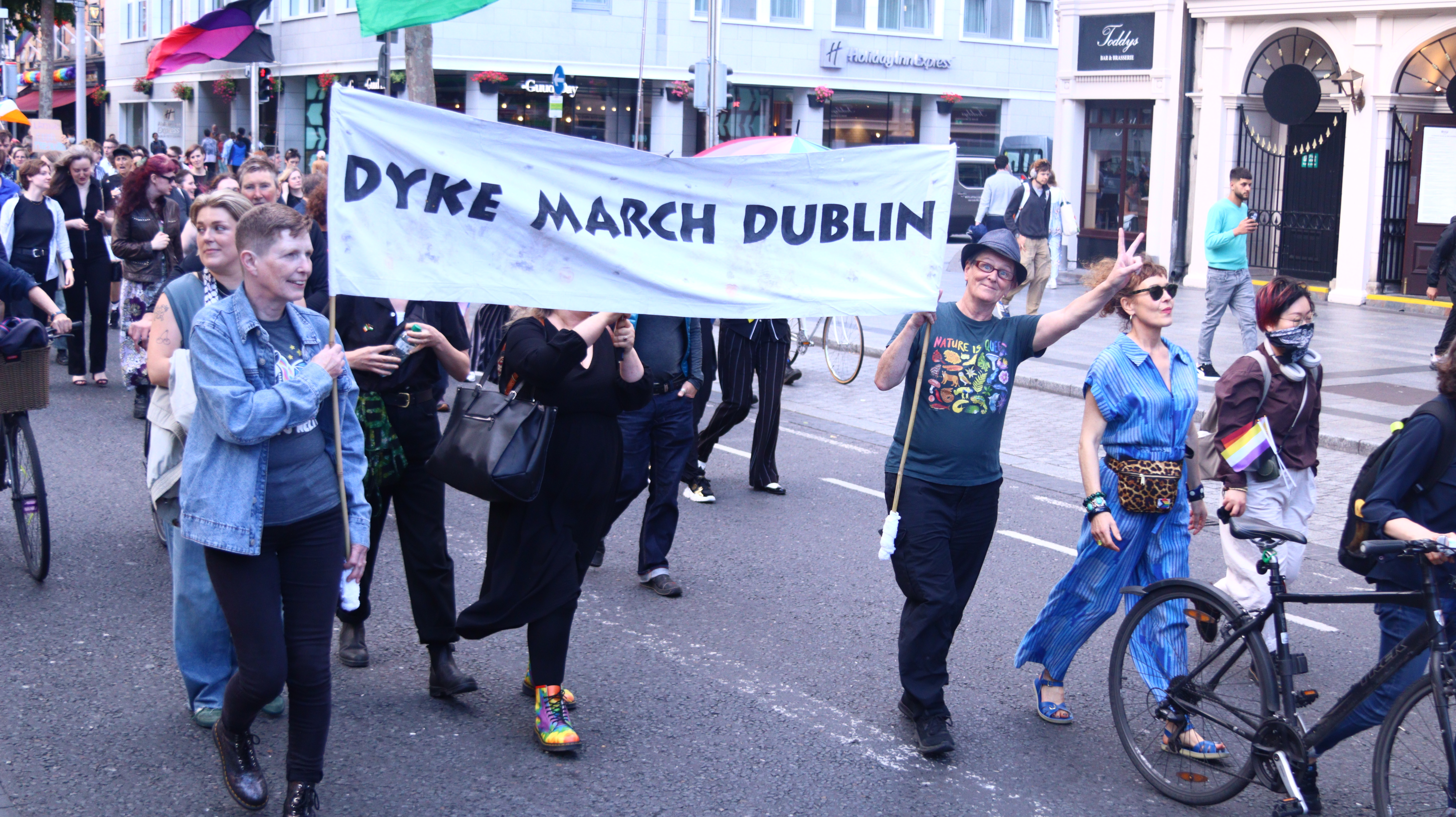
Ireland, Dublin, 2025

== See also ==
- List of LGBTQ events
- List of LGBTQ awareness periods
- Trans march
