= Gandzia =

Song
- Language: Ukrainian
- Written: Denys Bonkovskyi
- Published: 19th century
- Genre: Folk
- Composer: Denys Bonkovskyi (melody)

"Gandzia" (Ukrainian: «Гандзя», romanized: Handzia) is a Ukrainian folk song. It was composed by Denys Bonkovskyi, in the 19th century. Bonkovskyi also provided the song's text. The song's notes were recorded, harmonized and arranged for the piano by Antoni Kocipiński. The melody was later included in Semyon Tchernetsky's 1938 Trot-March.

== Text ==
Чи є в світі молодиця,
Як та Гандзя білолиця?
Ой скажіть-но, добрі люди,
Що зі мною тепер буде?

Приспів:
Гандзя – душка, Гандзя – любка,
Гандзя мила, як голубка.
Гандзя – рибка, Гандзя – птичка,
Гандзя – цяця-молодичка.

Гандзю моя, Гандзю мила,
Чим ти мене напоїла?
Чи любистком, чи чарами,
Чи солодкими словами?

Приспів

Is there a girl in the world
Like that white-faced Handzia?
Oh, tell me, good people,
What will happen to me now?

Refrain:
Handzia, my soul, Handzia, my love,
Handzia, lovely like a dove,
Handzia, a little fish, Handzia, a little bird,
Handzia, a little girl like a toy.

My Handzia, lovely Handzia,
What have you drunk me with?
With lovage, or with magic,
Or with sweet words?

Refrain
