= Eve Zaremba =

Canadian mystery writer (1930–2025)

- Born: December 29, 1930; Kalisz, Poland
- Died: October 8, 2025 (aged 94)
- Education: University of Toronto
- Occupation: Author
- Notable work: Helen Keremos series
- Spouse: Ottie Lockey (m. 2010)
- Website: www.evezaremba.com

Eve Zaremba (December 29, 1930 – October 8, 2025) was a Canadian mystery writer. She was active in the Women’s liberation movement in the 1970s and 1980s. She published several novels focusing on Helen Keremos, a private detective described as the first lesbian character in literary history to be the main character in an ongoing series of mystery novels.

== Life and career ==
Born in Poland on December 29, 1930, Zaremba moved to the United Kingdom with her family during World War II, spending the remainder of her childhood in London and then Scotland for 10 years. She immigrated to Canada with her parents in 1952, and graduated from the University of Toronto in 1963.

Zeremba's first Helen Keremos novel, A Reason to Kill, was published in 1978 by Paperjacks. At the time, it received little attention except for a feature in The Body Politic. Zaremba wrote five more books in the series and titles have been translated into German and Chinese editions. In 2019, Zaremba announced that a graphic novel adaptation of her second novel, Work for a Million, was expected to be published by Bedside Press in 2020. Following the closure of Bedside Press in 2019, the graphic novel (adapted by Amanda Deibert and illustrated by Selena Goulding) was published by McClellend & Stewart in 2021.

Oral history interviews with Zaremba are archived at The ArQuives.

In addition to her writing, Zaremba was a co-founder of Broadside: A Feminist Review, one of Canada's first major feminist publications. She also helped found The Women's Place, the Lesbian Organization of Toronto, and Women Against Violence Against Women. She was member of the Writers' Union of Canada. She also worked in advertising, marketing, real estate and publishing, as well as owning a used book store. She lived with her spouse, Ottie Lockey.

Zaremba died October 8, 2025, at the age of 94.

== Works ==
=== Novels ===
- A Reason to Kill (1978)
- Work for a Million (1986)
- Beyond Hope (1987)
- Uneasy Lies (1990)
- The Butterfly Effect (1994)
- White Noise (1997)
- Work for a Million (Graphic Novel adaptation) (2021)

=== Non-fiction ===
- Privilege of Sex: A Century of Canadian Women (1972) – editor
- The Broad Side, Reflections on a Long Life (2015)
