= Sigismund Zaremba =

Polish and Ukrainian composer (1861–1915)

Sigismund Vladislavovitch Zaremba (Russian: Сигизмунд Владиславович Заремба; 11 June 1861, Żytomierz, Volhynian Governorate, Russian Empire – 27 November 1915, Petrograd, Russian Empire) was a Polish and Ukrainian composer, music director, violinist, born in a Polish family, son of Vladislav Ivanovitch Zaremba, also a composer. Studied with Antoni Kocipiński in Kamenec Podlolski.

He studied with his father (piano) and Sattel and Alois (cello). From 1896 to 1901 he was director of the Imperial Russian Music Society and conductor of the symphony concerts at Voronesh. After that he lived in St. Petersburg. His compositions, which are distinguished by spontaneity and melodiousness, include a suite for string orchestra, a polonaise for full orchestra, a Slavic dance, a string quartet, piano music, romances, etc.

== Discography ==
- 2021: Acte Préalable AP0516 – Zygmunt Zaremba - Chamber Music

== See also ==
- Nikolai Zaremba
