= Zaręby =

Zaręby [zaˈrɛmbɨ] may refer to the following places:

- Zaręby, Gmina Żabia Wola, Grodzisk County in Masovian Voivodeship (east-central Poland)
- Zaręby, Maków County in Masovian Voivodeship (east-central Poland)
- Zaręby, Gmina Zakroczym, Nowy Dwór County in Masovian Voivodeship (east-central Poland)
- Zaręby, Przasnysz County in Masovian Voivodeship (east-central Poland)
- Zaręby, Podlaskie Voivodeship (north-east Poland)
- Zaręby, Warmian-Masurian Voivodeship (north Poland)
- Zaręby, West Pomeranian Voivodeship (north-west Poland)
