= Canadian Women's Movement Archives =

Canadian Feminist Archive Collection

The Canadian Women's Movement Archives (CWMA) (French: Archives canadiennes du mouvement des femmes (ACMF)) is an archival collection documenting the second women's liberation movement in Canada. The collection includes archival documents in various media dating from the 1960s to the 1990s. The collection has been housed at the University of Ottawa Library's Archives and Special Collections since 1992.

== Origins of the collection ==
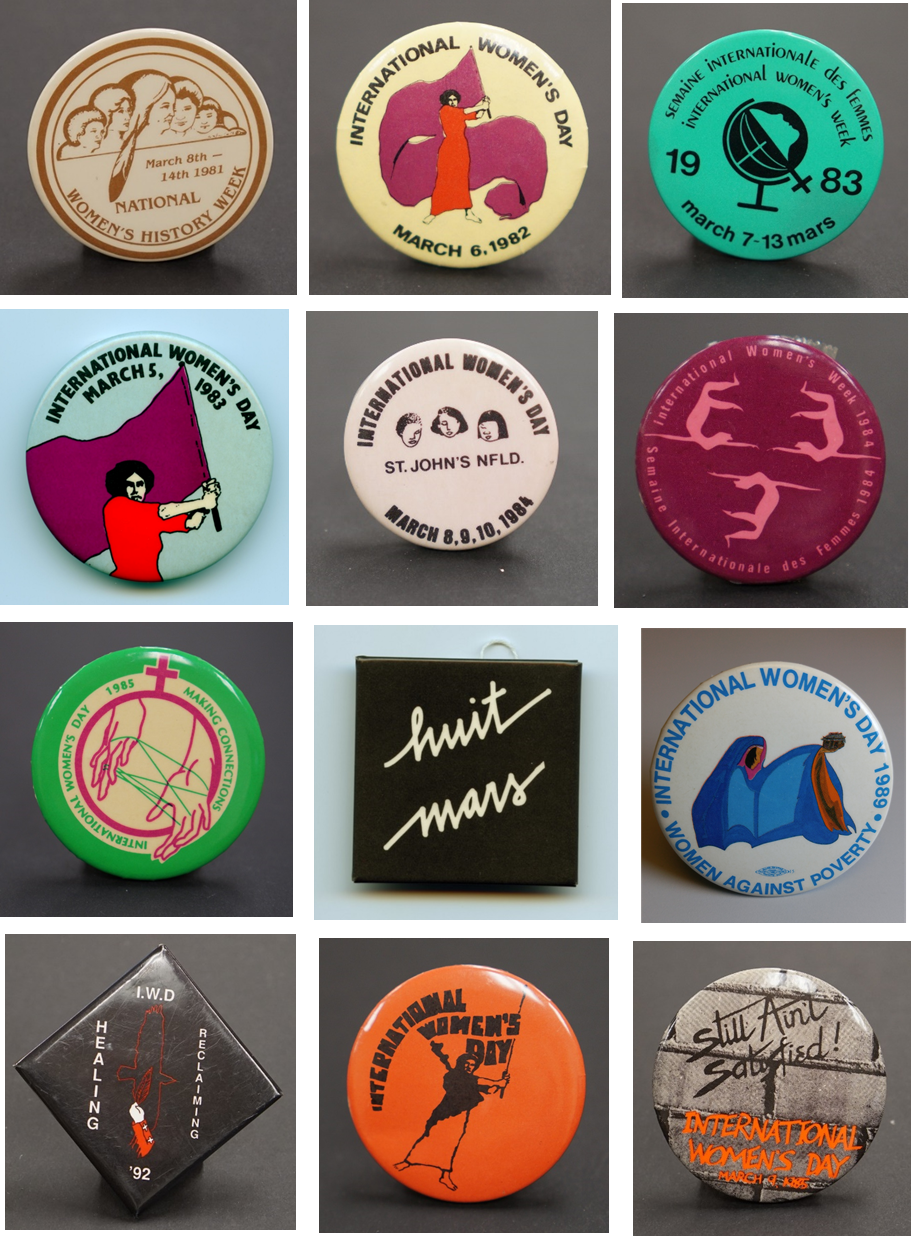
Buttons from the Canadian Women's Movement Archives.

When the Toronto-based feminist periodical, The Other Woman: A Revolutionary Feminist Newspaper, ceased publication in 1977, its editor-in-chief, Pat Leslie, decided to keep the files and related documents, initially storing them within her Toronto apartment. Leslie and several of her feminist colleagues subsequently established the foundations of what would become the Canadian Women’s Movement Archives collection. They reached out to other gender equality activists and organizations across Canada, asking for donations of all record formats and types that documented feminist history from 1960. The original group of volunteers formed a collective called the Women's Information Center (WIC) and obtained provincial status as a non-profit organization. After applying for and receiving a community development grant, the CWMA collective rented office space at the corner of Spadina Avenue and College Street in Toronto where they made the CWMA collection available to researchers. Members of the collective corresponded with feminist individuals and organizations, requesting copies of their publications and archives. In 1992, facing funding shortages, the CWMA collective donated the entire collection to the University of Ottawa Library. The CWMA collection is now housed at the University of Ottawa Library Archives and Special Collections.

== People involved ==
From 1983, Pat Leslie, Nancy Adamson, Sandy Fox, Weisia Kolansinka and Lorna Weir helped build and manage the CWMA as members of the Toronto Women's Information Centre (WIC) collective. Various collective members contributed to managing the CWMA before it was transferred to the University of Ottawa in 1992. Further collective members include Jane Abray, Karen Dubinsky, Sandy Fox, Debbie A. Green, Luanne Karn, Andrea Knight, Anne Molgat, Beth McAuley, Joanne Pelletier, Margaret Shepherd, Miriam Ticoll, and Tori Smith.

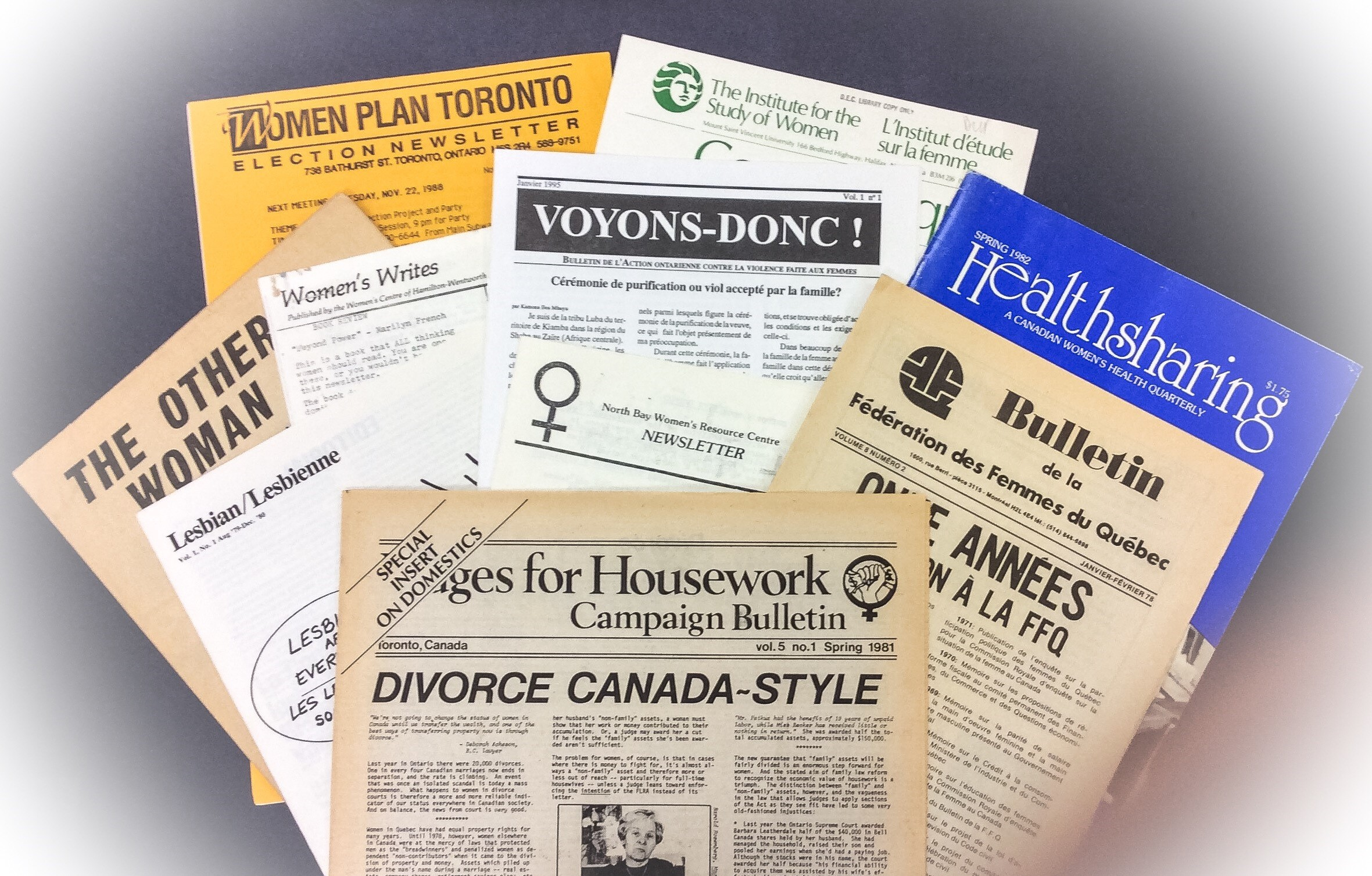
Feminist periodicals from the Canadian Women's Movement Archives.

== Content of the collection ==
The items in the collection are in a variety of formats and include textual documents, graphic documents, sound, and video recordings, as well as objects such as banners, T-shirts, buttons and ephemera. The collection is made up of 11 series: organizations, individuals, photographs, buttons, posters, conferences, thematic files on women's liberation, textile documents, sound recordings, ephemera, and various documentary resources. The collection also includes a feminist periodicals collection of over 1,400 titles.

== Key features of the collection ==
The CWMA collection’s original mandate was to preserve women's achievements and activist history, so that women’s experiences, actions, and demands could be passed on to future generations. As Pat Leslie explains: "must we allow our daughters to suffer the same mistakes as ourselves because we neglected to provide a continuity of ideas? Keeping ‘useless’ pieces of paper is never a waste of time. Nothing, nothing which relates to our movement should be thrown away ".

The CWMA collective members consciously chose unconventional archiving practices to represent the collective nature of second wave feminism in Canada, organizing series by individuals and organizations, rather than following the archival principle of provenance. The arrangement of series by multimedia formats also prominently features photographs, posters, buttons, and banners relating to the social protest movement. Its origins and history are not unlike other alternative archives that developed from North American counterculture movements of the 1960s: examples include the Lesbian Herstory Archives in Brooklyn, New York, and The ArQuives in Toronto, Ontario.

== Impact and legacy of the collection ==
The CWMA collection is a key reference source for researchers interested in the history of second wave feminism in Canada. The CWMA collection also provided the basis for the University of Ottawa Library's Women’s Archives which features approximately 170 archival fonds of women and organizations that worked to improve the status of women across Canada. The University of Ottawa Library Archives and Special Collections have developed several virtual exhibitions featuring the CWMA collection: Women and Politics; Our Bodies, Our Stories; Women at Work; The Pro-Choice Movement in Canada. Some of the CWMA collection’s items have also been featured in external exhibitions: the plate from the Morgentaler Clinic in Toronto is currently on display at the Canadian Museum of History in Gatineau; buttons from the CWMA collection have been borrowed during the exhibition Trailblazing: Women in Canada since 1867, curated by Kei Seiling Waterloo Region Museum (September 2017 to January 2018); periodicals and brochures has been featured in the exhibition Desire Lines. Displaced Narratives of Place at Artexte Gallery in Montreal in 2022.

Inspired by the CWMA initiative as well as by Margaret Fulford’s national resource guide on Canadian feminist archives, the University of Ottawa Archives and Special Collections developed a Canadian Women's Movements Portal as part of the 5-year funded Women’s Archives Initiative aimed at bringing increased attention to the archives. Launched on March 8, 2023, the bilingual French-English tool enables researchers to locate existing Canadian archival collections on women's activism from the 1960s to the present day. The portal also documents the history of women’s activism.

The CWMA collection has been recognized as documentary heritage of national significance and was added to the Canada Memory of the World Register of the Canadian Commission for UNESCO on March 5, 2025.
