= Nikolai Zaremba =

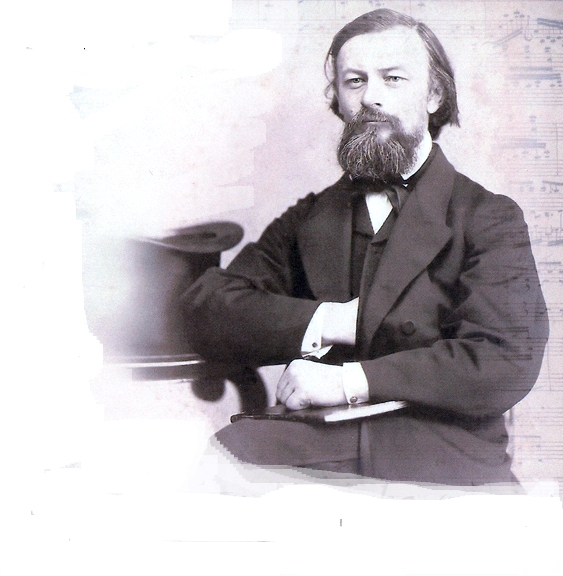
Photograph of Nicolai Zaremba, made around 1860

Nikolai or Nicolaus Ivanovich von Zaremba (Russian: Никола́й Ива́нович Заре́мба; 15 June [O.S. 3 June] 1821 – 8 April [O.S. 27 March] 1879) was a Russian musical theorist, teacher and composer. His most famous student was Pyotr Ilyich Tchaikovsky, who became his pupil in 1861. Others included Fyodor Dostoevsky's nephews, the children of his brother Mikhail and Vasily Safonov. Until 2010 almost nobody knew what he had composed.

== Biography ==
Zaremba was born in a Polish noble family on the family estate Ozupiene in the countryside of Vitebsk Governorate, at one time Polish Livonia, nowadays Ludza Municipality in Latvia. His birth date according to the Russian Biographical Dictionary was 3/15 June 1821 (however, the date shown on his gravestone is 31 May/12 June 1821). He went to grammar school in Daugavpils. During his law study (1840-1844) at the Saint Petersburg Imperial University, Anton Gerke was his piano teacher; Johann Benjamin Gross became his cello and theory teacher. He composed a Concert-Overture for full orchestra (1842), influenced by Beethoven (the premiere was held in the hall of the University of December 28, 1842, conducted by Karl Schubert); around 1843 a mazurka, influenced by Frédéric Chopin.

Zaremba was appointed at the Ministry of Internal Affairs. He escaped from a transport to Siberia after he had joined the utopian Petrashevsky Circle, just like Dostoevsky. When his father, a colonel in the army, died Zaremba changed his goal.

In 1852 he moved to Berlin and studied composition under Adolf Bernhard Marx. He met with Franz Liszt and Hans von Bülow, a famous director. In 1854 he left Germany. Zaremba started a career as cantor of the Lutheran Church of Saint Peter and Saint Paul, after he married the Lutheran Jacobine Philippine Adeleide von Klugen. In 1860 he joined the Russian Musical Society.

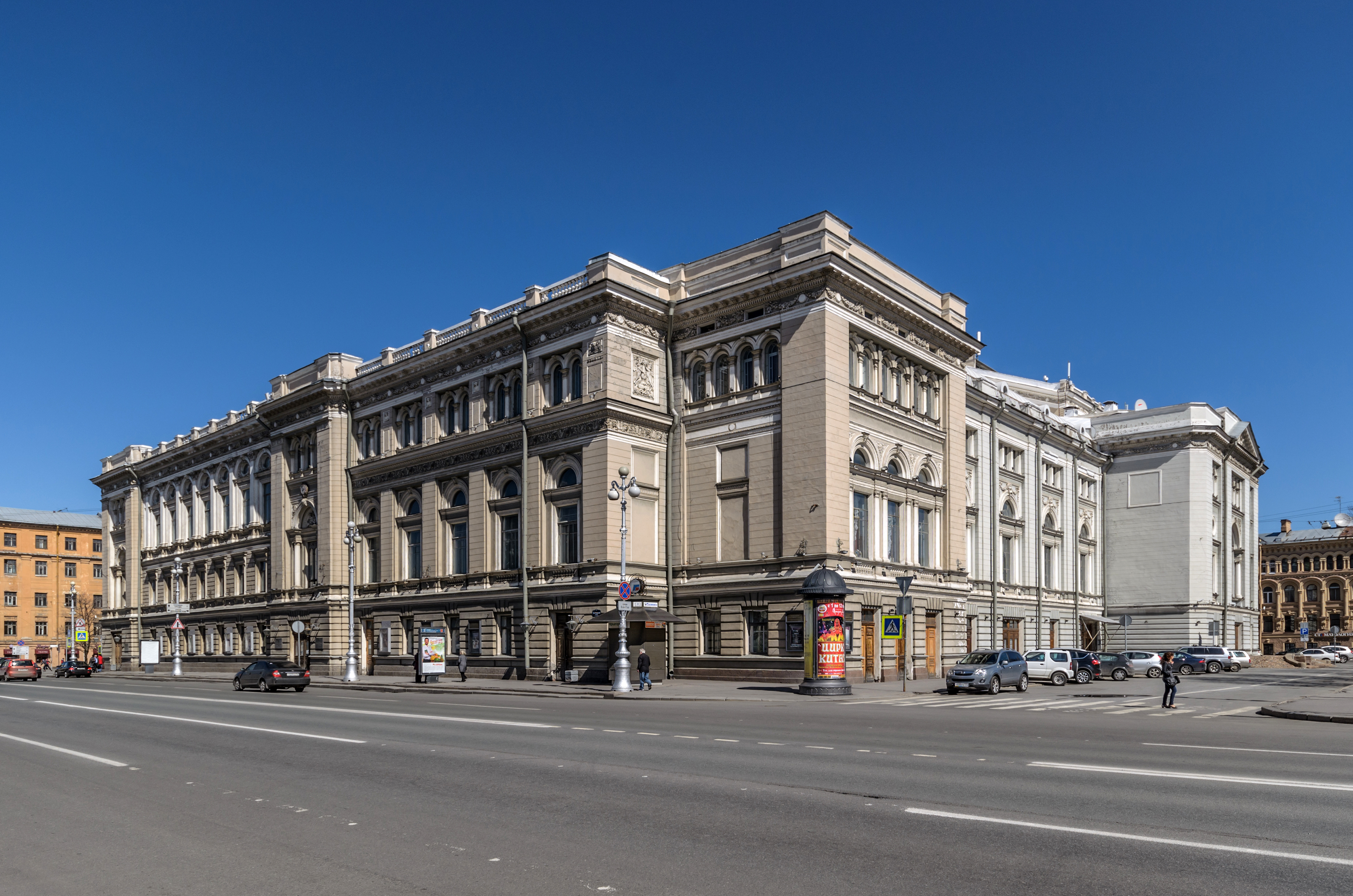
Saint Petersburg Conservatory

He was appointed as one of the professors at the Saint Petersburg Conservatory when it was founded in 1862. Zaremba taught composition and harmony in the Russian language, then not very common. In 1867, he succeeded Anton Rubinstein as director of the conservatory. (For a while Modest Mussorgsky lived at Zaremba's brother's house.) In 1871 Zaremba moved to Ludwigsburg, after a conflict with Grand Duchess Elena Pavlovna. Nikolai Rimsky-Korsakov was appointed as his successor.

Zaremba composed most of his piano works and the oratorio in Württemberg. He returned to the Russian Empire after two years. Then Vasily Safonov became his (private) pupil. In 1878 he had a stroke and died the following year; he was buried at Volkovo Cemetery. His wife and daughters moved to Clarens, Switzerland, near Montreux, with many of his compositions, which were given to Basel University and traced in 2010. His daughter Lydia Zaremba was married to Theo Heemskerk, a Dutch politician.

Zaremba's life and work was studied by Andrey Alexeev-Boretsky, a librarian and musicologist at the St. Peterburg conservatory. A small exhibition was held, commemorating its founders after 150 years. The Dutch online radio station Concertzender, recorded some of his music.

== Works ==
- Two overtures, 1 string quartet, 9 piano works, many choir works, and an oratorio John the Baptist.

== Reception ==
His extreme conservatism colored both his teaching in general and what he expected from his students in particular. Along with Anton Rubinstein, and opposed to the forward-looking and nationalist tendencies of The Five, Zaremba remained suspicious, even hostile, to new trends in music. Instead, he attempted to preserve what he saw as the best in the Western tradition in the immediate past. According to Herman Laroche Zaremba idolized Beethoven, particularly the late works, but his personal tastes had progressed no further than Mendelssohn. If anyone were to ask him about Hector Berlioz, Robert Schumann or, closer to home, Mikhail Glinka Zaremba would probably have had to admit to knowing nothing.

Tchaikovsky biographer David Brown writes that Zaremba's chief deficit was a complete lack of true inventiveness musically or of any other sort of imagination. Sticking to the composition handbook of his teacher, Adolph Bernhard Marx, Zaremba sent his students from there to study strict counterpoint and church modes as explained by Heinrich Bellermann. Because of his lack of inventiveness, Zaremba's only way to improve a student's composition was to impose the straight-and-narrow rules of composition which he apparently learned so thoroughly himself.

Zaremba apparently had few, if any, creative energies of his own, having composed little and published nothing. He reportedly wrote at least one symphony, a quartet in the style of Joseph Haydn, according to Tchaikovsky, and an oratorio entitled John the Baptist. For a professor of composition at a conservatory, this meagerness of output was unusual.

This lack of compositional output may have contributed to the undistinguished opinion held generally about Zaremba, a viewpoint Tchaikovsky ultimately shared as well. Since Zaremba was the one who encouraged Tchaikovsky initially to apply himself more seriously in his musical studies, such a lack of compositional effort on Zaremba's part must have been doubly perplexing to Tchaikovsky.

== See also ==
- Sigismund Zaremba

== Sources ==
- Brown, David, Tchaikovsky: The Early Years, 1840-1874 (New York, W.W. Norton & Company, Inc., 1978)
- Holden, Anthony, Tchaikovsky: A Biography (New York: Random House, 1995)
- Poznansky, Alexander, Tchaikovsky: The Quest for the Inner Man (New York, Schirmer Books, 1991)
- Strutte, Wilson, Tchaikovsky, His Life and Times (Speldhurst, Kent, United Kingdom: Midas Books, 1979)
- Warrack, John, Tchaikovsky (New York: Charles Scribner's Sons, 1973)
