= Ivan Berry =

Canadian music executive (born 1963)

- Born: November 1963 (age 62–63)
- Occupations: music publisher, entrepreneur
- Notable work: Dream Warriors

Ivan Berry (born November 1963) is a Canadian music industry executive producer, music publisher, A&R manager, music business educator and lecturer, global speaker, entrepreneur, pop culture influencer and socio-political cultural attaché.

He co-founded Beat Factory Productions alongside songwriter Rupert Gayle in 1982, which was later relaunched to Beat Factory Music, Inc., and was distributed by EMI Music Canada and BMG Music Canada. Berry serves as the longtime manager of Juno award-winning songwriter Rupert Gayle and the Dream Warriors hip hop group. An attributed supporter of the development of artists worldwide, through his 360Artistry "all rights" brand management company, Berry is an international music management and artist development facilitator for various governments of the Caribbean. He served as keynote speaker at the Fifth Summit of the Americas.

== Early life and career ==
Berry was born in 1963 on the Caribbean island nation of St. Kitts to a Swedish-Portuguese mother and a prominent Afro-Caribbean father who served as a medical doctor and the governor-general of the island.

At age 15, Berry migrated with his family to Ajax, Ontario, where he landed his first job working as a DJ at a local roller skating rink. The music-driven entertainment and recreation center served as the grounds where Berry would meet fellow musicians Rupert Gayle, Richard Rodwell and Len Grant. The four music-driven teenagers joined forces in funk music. In 1981, they formed Traffic Jam, a funk band managed by Berry and fronted by singer Gayle, which gained success in the Toronto music scene with live performances at popular venues including BamBoo and Horseshoe Tavern.

"With money made from playing, the group invested in a small four-track studio setup based around a Yamaha MT1X," writes music journalist Simon Trask. "It was as a result of interest in some tracks which they put together with local rapper LA Luv that they decided to fold the (Traffic Jam) group, start up Beat Factory and concentrate on developing Toronto's rap talent." During a 2025 interview, Berry credited Rupert Gayle’s brother, DJ for Michie Mee, Phillip "LA Luv" Gayle, as a critical conduit of inspiration that fuelled Berry and Gayle to drive the launch of their Beat Factory Productions independent record label, music management and production company as a lane exclusively created by and for the historically Black, underground and underrepresented rap artist echoing the Black culture and collective consciousness that spelled what the streets of 1980s and 1990s Toronto sounded like. “I think Rupert Gayle and I still thank his brother LA Luv, for exposing us to that,” Berry noted. “Because the level of passion, and the lyrics, and the want and need to express themselves was mind blowing.”

== Beat Factory ==
In 1981, Berry and Gayle co-founded Beat Factory Productions, a historically Black-Canadian independent record label that carried a roster of underground, underrepresented and systematically-marginalized Black-Canadian artists, many of whom lived in Toronto's public housing projects since they had immigrated to Canada with parents who were foreign workers under the Commonwealth nation's West Indian Domestic Scheme.

Born at a time when mainstream media presented a monotony of the likes of Blondie, Pink Floyd, and Oliva Newton-John ruling the television and radio airwaves, Berry and Gayle’s independent Beat Factory label presented a cultural clapback for diversity, inclusion and representation of the unsung Black-Canadian rap, hip-hop and dance artists that championed the underground music scene of 1980s- and 1990s-era Toronto. "Ivan Berry had a big influence on me being expressly Jamaican because I would hide it,” explained Michie Mee during a 2015 interview published by Vice magazine. “He (Ivan Berry) told me to rap how I talk.”

Despite the infamous lack of representation he and his artists faced across mainstream Canadian media, Berry was able to facilitate an international-record deal with First Priority Music / Atlantic Records, leading Michie Mee to become the first Canadian hip-hop artist to sign with a major American label - a move that was further highlighted by Michie Mee's featured appearance alongside Queen Latifah, Monie Love and Ms. Melodie in the 1989 American music video for the Queen Latifah-headlined rap single "Ladies First".

"Another massive success for the company was the international recognition of Dream Warriors in Europe and Japan," reports Canada Black Music Archives. "Dream Warriors, signed to Island Records in the UK... sold over 800,000 copies of their break-out album, And Now the Legacy Begins." Highlighted by the pioneering jazz-rap sounds of Dream Warriors, the artistic amalgam of Michie Mee's Jamaican Funk—Canadian Style, and the revolutionary rap injected by the Rascalz, the impact of Beat Factor on mainstream music and popular culture remains present, evident and clearly embedded in Canadian history.

== Awards and honors ==
In 2000, Berry received a Lifetime Achievement Award from the Urban Music Association of Canada.

In 2004, at the climax of The City of Toronto's societal Caribbean cultural-shift highlighted by 63rd mayor of Toronto David Miller's proclamation that recognized February 6th as being Bob Marley Day in Toronto, Berry was presented the Bob Marley Day Award in honor of his "community involvement and positive influence on youth."

In 2021, in recognition of his historic, cultural contributions and pioneering role in Canadian music and entertainment, Berry received an OMA Lifetime Achievement Award and Hall Of Fame induction.

Berry's likeness was immortalized in the poster for the 2023 key art exhibition, "The First 50: Toronto’s Hip Hop Architects."

== Discography ==
Album	Year	Artist	Credit
Victory Is Calling / On This Mic	1988	Michie Mee and L.A. Luv	Producer
Jamaican Funk—Canadian Style	1991	Michie Mee and L.A. Luv	Management & production
Juno Awards Collection - The Night Canadian Music Comes Home	1994	Rupert Gayle and various	Artist management
Beat Factory GROOVEssentials Volume 1	1996	Various	Executive producer
Beat Factory Rap Essentials Volume Two	1997	Various	Executive producer
Anthology: A Decade of Hits 1988–1998	1998	Dream Warriors	Executive producer
The Legacy Continues...	2002	Dream Warriors	A&R
Keshia Chanté	2004	Keshia Chanté	A&R

== Filmography ==
- Rise Up: Canadian Pop Music in the 1980s, TV Movie (2009)
- Sounds Black, TV miniseries (2025)

== See also ==
- Canadian hip hop
- Music of Canada
