= Mathematik (rapper) =

- Also known as: Math-U
- Born: Lyndon Dash
- Origin: Malvern, Toronto, Ontario, Canada
- Genre: Hip-hop
- Occupations: Rapper; songwriter
- Years active: 1996–present
- Labels: Beat Factory; Urbnet Records
- Formerly of: Down Ta Erf
- Website: urbnet.com/mathematik

Lyndon Dash, better known by his stage name Mathematik, is a Canadian rapper from Malvern, Toronto. He was the rapper of the group Down Ta Erf, with producers Wall and Steel.

== Career ==
In 1996, the Down Ta Erf's song "Learn to Earn" appeared on the compilation album Rap Essentials Volume One. In 1997, the group released a self-titled demo album on the label Beat Factory. It is the only album the group released. In 1998, the song "Formation" appeared on MuchMusic. In 1999, Mathematik released his debut solo album Ecology. Both Down Ta Erf and Ecology became highly regarded underground classics in Canadian hip-hop. In 2000, his song "Illmath (Weapons)" was featured on the soundtrack of the television series Drop the Beat. In 2005, he released the album No Division on Urbnet Records. In 2007, he released No Division 2.1. After a long hiatus, he released four more albums with Urbnet Records, ReAL/iS-HiM (2019), H2o (2020), No Division Vol. 2 (2022), and Mathuniversal (2023).

== Legacy ==
Hart House included him in their list "The First 50: Toronto's Hip Hop Architects". His song "Toronto" is featured in the Apple Music playlist "Toronto Hip-Hop Pioneers". Matthew Rolfe of Read Foyer named him as part of the "golden era" of Toronto hip-hop. A photo of him breakdancing in 2001 was used as the cover of the 2018 book Everything Remains Raw: Photographing Toronto's Hip Hop Culture from Analogue to Digital by Mark V. Campbell. In 2025, he performed at the Canada Black Music Archives showcase for Black History Month.

== Discography ==
=== Studio albums ===
- Down Ta Erf (1997) (with Down Ta Erf)
- Ecology (1999)
- No Division (2005)
- No Division 2.1 (2007)
- ReAL/iS-HiM (2019)
- H2o (2020)
- No Division Vol. 2 (2022)
- Mathuniversal (2023)

=== Guest appearances ===
- "Learn to Earn" (with Down Ta Erf) from Rap Essentials Volume One by Various Artists (1996)
- "Illmath (Weapons)" from Drop the Beat by Various Artists (2000)
- "Better Ones", "Good Life", "Late Night Rollin" and "Freedom" from Now by Freedom Writers (2013)
- "Wish You’re Looking For" from Aspire to Inspire by Es (2014)
- "We Are Only Getting Older" from We Are Only Getting Older by Es (2017)
- "Rap Essentials" from Dear Hip Hop: 20 Years Later by Dan-e-o (2017)
- "Crawl Walk Run" and "The Uber" from Access to All Lanes by Solar-C (2018)
- "Fountain of Youth" from Sunshowers by CrossLake (2020)
- "Build" from Beat Barbarian, Vol. 1 by Navi the North (2020)
- "Training Day" from Raw and Homemade 2 by Tranzformer (2021)
- "Block" from Driver Or Driven by Es and Das Da Beat Junkie (2023)
- "King of the World" from Rewind by Alcynoos, Parental and Loop.Holes (2023)
- "Carnival" from Rediscovery by Elaquent (2023)
- "Deligence" from Remix Compilation, Vol. 1 by P_Phil (2025)
