= Ecology (Mathematik album) =

Studio album by Mathematik
- Released: March 23, 1999
- Studios: Wellesley Sound Studios; Number Nine Studio; Red Light Audio
- Genre: Hip-hop
- Length: 61:16
- Labels: Beat Factory; 90's Tapes
- Producers: Quattro Cinqo; The Golden Boy; Erf Productions; D.R.K.

Mathematik chronology
Ecology (1999)	No Division (2005)

Ecology is the debut studio album by Canadian rapper Mathematik (also known as Math-U). It was released by Beat Factory on March 23, 1999. The album was produced by Quattro Cinqo, The Golden Boy, Erf Productions and D.R.K. It features guest appearances from Six-Pac, Boom, Bahamadia, Sic Sense and Spade. Additionally, Mathematik provides scratches throughout the album. It was reissued by 90's Tapes on March 30, 2021.

The song "Learn to Earn" first appeared on the 1996 compilation album Rap Essentials Volume One. "Formation", "On My Mind", "Ta Each Iz Own", "Learn to Earn" and the original version of "Rhyme Trainin" first appeared on his group Down Ta Erf's 1997 self-titled demo album. In 1998, "Formation" was featured on MuchMusic.

== Critical reception ==
Del F. Cowie of Exclaim! praised his "seemingly effortless balance" of "introspective, thought-provoking lyrics" and "original delivery, nimble wordplay and earnest approach". In 2005, Cowie called the album "an elusively rare but essential Canadian b-boy document".

In 2022, Christoph Gleich of HHV Mag called it one of the best hip-hop albums of all time.

== Track listing ==
No.	Title	Producer	Length
1.	"Intro"		0:46
2.	"Everyday Movement"	Quattro Cinqo	3:45
3.	"Formation"	The Golden Boy	4:02
4.	"Interlude"		0:17
5.	"Industrialized"	Erf Productions	3:35
6.	"Plastic"	Erf Productions	3:55
7.	"Interlude"		0:54
8.	"My Enemy"	Erf Productions	3:32
9.	"On My Mind"	Erf Productions	4:05
10.	"Ta Each Iz Own"	Erf Productions	4:05
11.	"Interlude"		0:11
12.	"Rhyme Trainin' Remix"	Erf Productions	3:40
13.	"Step Lightly" (featuring Six-Pac)	D.R.K.	3:22
14.	"Strive On"	Erf Productions	2:44
15.	"It Was I" (featuring Boom)	Erf Productions	3:23
16.	"Learn To Earn"	Erf Productions	3:47
17.	"Better By The Letter"	Erf Productions	4:18
18.	"Interlude" (featuring Bahamadia)		0:46
19.	"Following Goals" (featuring Bahamadia)	Erf Productions	4:52
20.	"Space and Time" (featuring Sic Sense and Spade)	Erf Productions	4:30
21.	"Outro"		0:47
Total length:			61:16
