= Crack of dawn =

Crack of dawn may refer to:

- Crack of Dawn, a Canadian band
- Crack ov Dawn, a French band
- Crack o' Dawn, a 1925 silent film
