= Ravin' =

Canadian band

- Origin: Canada
- Genre: Jazz-funk
- Years active: 1970s
- Past members: Rich Morrison; Hugh Brockie; Peter Jeffrey; Dave James; Peter Elias; Jack Lenz; Wayne St. John; Marty Morell

Ravin' was a 1970s Canadian jazz-funk band that had a half an LP release on CBC Records and won the first Q107 homegrown contest.

Performing regularly at the El Mocambo and the Isabella Tavern in Toronto, Ontario, Ravin' achieved moderate success and helped perpetuate the careers of many of its members. Parts of their performance also included Latin-funk overtones, as exhibited on the Rick Morrison/Santana track "Aruba/Europa".

Marty Morell went on to have a jazz-based career. Jack Lenz a popular television and film composer in Canada and has written original songs for Andrea Bocelli, Nanalan', The Grogs, Little Mosque On The Prairie, Due South, and Men With Brooms.

Rich (Rick) Morrison, a featured performer on April Wine's album, On Record, has recorded and performed with Martha Reeves, Long John Baldry, Roger Whittaker, The Good Brothers, Teenage Head, Rupert "Ojiji" Harvey of Messenjah, THP Orchestra, The Band, The Sattalites, and Ronnie Hawkins.

Vocalist Wayne St. John (né Wayne Alan Richardson), who besides having an extensive solo career and being entered into the Black Canadian Music Hall of Fame (1982), sang lead vocals for Ocean (band), Domenic Troiano band, Dr. Music (with Doug Riley and Don Thompson), THP Orchestra, Motherlode, Dr. Lonnie Smith and performed on the single "Tears Are Not Enough" – which was recorded by a Canadian super-group to raise money and awareness for the 1983–1984 Ethiopia famine. He was nominated for a Juno Award in 1977. He later created about 1,000 jingles for various companies and commercial products. St. John is the father of actress Michelle St. John (Michelle L. Richardson).

Hugh Brockie was one of Ronnie Hawkins' "Hawks" and a founding member of Bearfoot and Skylark.

== Album line-up ==
- Rich Morrison: Saxophones, Vocals
- Hugh Brockie: Guitar, Vocals
- Peter Jeffrey: Trumpet, Flute
- Dave James: Drums
- Peter Elias: Bass
- Jack Lenz: Keyboards
- Wayne St. John: Vocals
- Marty Morrell: Congas

== Track listing ==
1. "Opus #1" – (Hugh Brockie) – 5:19
2. "Don't Push It" (Hugh Brockie) – 4:19
3. "Aruba/Europa" (Rick Morrison/Santana) – 7:05
4. "Funky Thang" (Rick Morrison) – 4:42

== Production ==
- Recorded at Studio 4S, Toronto
- Recording Engineers: David Dobbs, Tom Shipton
- Producer: Keith Duncan
- Remix Engineer: Larry Morey
