= Spek =

Canadian rapper

Hussain Yoosuf, better known by his stage name Spek, is a Canadian hip hop musician. He is best known for his singles "Smell the Coffee" and "I'm a Hippie". He is a former member of the Canadian hip hop pioneers, Dream Warriors, and, more recently, known for his work as an entrepreneur and music publisher.

== Early career ==
Spek started rapping at the age of 14 in his hometown of Montreal, Quebec. He joined the hip hop group Dream Warriors shortly after the release of their hit songs "My Definition of a Boombastic Jazz Style" and "Wash Your Face in My Sink".

At the age of 17, he signed a worldwide record contract with EMI and toured the world before settling in London. Spek soon found himself touring across Europe with the British jazz-rap crew Us3. Working with his musical partner Brian Rose, he collaborated with members of Jamiroquai and with Nitin Sawhney. Sawhney's album, Beyond Skin, featuring Spek was highly praised by Sting and Madonna, won the South Bank Album Award and was nominated for the Mercury Music Prize. He appeared on the BBC TV programme Later... with Jools Holland.

== Increasing prominence ==
Spek's songs were used in advertising campaigns by Nokia and Fox Entertainment Group and in the DreamWorks Pictures 2004 comedy Envy. Spek's single, "Smell the Coffee", was used several times in the Old Vic in EastEnders.

The Times described his music as "a gentle and genial collection of dreamy love songs and street smart hip hop grooves". Loaded magazine described his album, Don't Sweat the Small Stuff, as "like Prince and De La Soul in a mucky mudwrestle. Exceptional," and gave it 10 out of 10. In 2003, Spek was asked to co-host the Juno Awards. His "Look Me Up" video was voted number one on MTV UK's Daily Chart Live. His "I'm a Hippie" single was a hit in Canada.

== Films ==
In 2005, Spek was cast in a lead role in the UK/European independent feature film Nefarious, starring with the Danish star Kim Bodnia and others. Playing a dual, he also wrote the film's soundtrack and score with his longtime collaborator Brian Rose. The film was screened at the 2005 Cannes Film Festival.

In 2006, Spek began development of his next film project, Fricky Khan, about a Sri Lankan motorcycle racer and multiple Grand Prix winner who died at a young age. The story is based on the life of his uncle.

== Music executive ==
After years of working as a recording artist, writer, composer, producer and music publishing executive, Spek moved to Dubai in the United Arab Emirates in 2006 to establish the first music publisher in the United Arab Emirates. As managing director, partner and founder of Fairwood Music (Arabia), Spek pioneered respect for musical copyrights in the Middle East, handling some of the world's leading music catalogues for the Middle East and North Africa including those of Universal Music Publishing Group and EMI Music Publishing.

In 2011, Spek launched a new firm, PopArabia, supported by the Abu Dhabi government initiative twofour54. PopArabia represents the music publishing catalogs of Sony ATV, EMI Music Publishing, Kobalt Music, Concord Music, Peermusic and others. PopArabia connects international stakeholders seeking opportunities in the Middle East and those in the Middle East seeking access to world class music.

In January 2015, it was announced that Spek would move to New York, taking on a new role as the senior vice president, creative and A&R at the New York City music publisher Reservoir Media Management.

Spek continues to release music independently. In September 2019, he performed his song "Pilgrim" with his friend and collaborator Nitin Sawhney to a sold-out audience at the Royal Albert Hall for the 20th anniversary of Sawhney's breakthrough album Beyond Skin. Spek is also featured on Sawhney's album, Immigrants, featured on the single Lifeline released in July 2020.

In February 2020, it was announced that Spek had returned to the UAE, focused on opportunities in emerging markets.

== Discography ==
=== Albums and EPs ===
- Look Me Up (2001)
- Don't Sweat the Small Stuff (2002)

=== Singles ===
- "I'm a Hippie" (2001)
- "Smell the Coffee" (2002)

=== Releases with Dream Warriors ===
- Subliminal Simulation (1994)
- The Master Plan (1996)
- Anthology: A Decade of Hits 1988–1998 (1999)

=== Guest appearances ===
- Beres Hammond – "Highlight of the Day"
- Nitin Sawhney – "The Pilgrim"
- Nitin Sawhney – "Lifeline"
- Kinnie Starr – "E-Merged"
- Bass is Base – Memories of the Soulshack Survivors
- The Dukes of Hang Gliding – My Cinema
- Kinnie Starr – "I'm Ready"
- Kinnie Starr – "I'm A Ghost"
