= Scales Empire =

Scales Empire was a Canadian hip hop band from Montreal, Quebec, active in the mid-1990s. Although they released only one known recording, "Bright Lights, Big City" on Beat Factory's 1996 compilation album Rap Essentials Volume One, the song was a Juno Award nominee for Best Rap Recording at the Juno Awards of 1997.

The group consisted of rapper Kandu and producer T-Wyze.

In addition to its Juno Award nomination, "Bright Lights, Big City" also received a MuchMusic Video Award nomination for Best Rap Video at the 1997 MMVAs.
