= Ron Nelson (DJ) =

Canadian DJ (born 1962)

Ron Nelson (born 1962) is a Toronto-based DJ, broadcaster, music promoter, producer, educator, and performer best known for his role in popularizing both hip hop music and later dancehall and reggae music in Canada. He helped promote and develop early Canadian hip hop acts such as Maestro Fresh Wes, Michie Mee, Rumble & Strong and the Dream Warriors.

Nelson was born in Pembroke Hall, Jamaica and emigrated to Canada in 1972.

He grew up in Scarborough and attended Victoria Park Collegiate Institute, where he organized a mock radio station that would pipe music to the cafeteria.

Known as the "godfather of Toronto hip hop", Nelson created Canada's first hip hop radio show, Fantastic Voyage, on CKLN-FM in 1983. The Saturday afternoon show, which ran until 1991, became popular among Toronto youth and was the first exposure many had to the genre and was one of the few broadcast outlets for hip hop in Canada during the 1980s. Nelson soon began organizing concerts, his first event being for the Kings of Rap. He went on to bring American hip hop artists to Canada for concerts and tours including, organizing in 1987, the first major rap concert in Canada when Run DMC, Public Enemy and EPMD performed at Varsity Arena.

With the revenues from the concert, Nelson built one of the first hip hop recording studios in Canada, "Apache", in the basement of his Scarborough home. The studio, shared with Beat Factory was where Dream Warriors recorded their first album, And Now the Legacy Begins, on which Nelson is credited as a producer.

Nelson was the best known hip hop concert promoter in Toronto in the 1980s and early 1990s, often staging his events at the Concert Hall at Toronto's Masonic Temple where he staged multi-artist concerts that featured acts such as Public Enemy, Boogie Down Productions, Roxanne Shante, Salt-N-Pepa, Eric B. & Rakim, Ice Cube and Queen Latifah as well as giving exposure to local acts with "Monster Jams" and "rap battles" between Toronto and New York performers.

As hip hop became more commercial, Nelson became disillusioned with the genre and ended Fantastic Voyage in 1991.

He moved to dancehall and reggae, deejaying around the city and promoting shows before returning to CKLN in 1993 to launch what became ReggaeMania, a Friday night radio show that continued on CKLN until the radio station went off the air in 2011, and was then revived on CHIN-FM where it aired on Saturday nights from 2012 until 2014.

Nelson owns and operates Reggaemania.com, an online hub which offers 24 hour internet radio station called ReggaeMania Radio, podcasts, downloads as well as news and concert listings as well as a ReggaeMania app.

Nelson attended Ryerson Polytechnical Institute (now Toronto Metropolitan University) from 1983 to 1985 earning a degree in Radio and Television Arts. He taught the course "Contemporary Black Urban Music" at York University from 2005 until 2017. Renowned students under his tutelage include local Toronto Eminem impersonator "xavierbucknor".

In 2023, he released his first rap album, 40 Years Too Late.
