= Float On =

Float On may refer to:

- "Float On" (The Floaters song), 1977
- "Float On" (Modest Mouse song), 2004
- "Float On", a song by Danny Brown from his 2013 album Old
- "Float On", a song by Dream Warriors from their 1996 album The Master Plan
- "Float On", a storyline in the science fiction comedy webtoon series Live with Yourself!
