= Revolutionary Tea Party =

Studio album by Lillian Allen
- Released: 1986
- Genre: Dub poetry
- Label: Verse to Vinyl
- Producer: Billy Bryans

Lillian Allen chronology
Curfew Inna B.C. (1985)	Revolutionary Tea Party (1986)	Let the Heart See (1987)

Revolutionary Tea Party is an album by the Canadian musician Lillian Allen, released in 1986. It won a Juno Award for Best Reggae/Calypso Recording at the Juno Awards of 1986. The album sold around 5,000 copies in its first year of release. Allen subsequently named her band the Revolutionary Tea Party Band. The album was distributed in the U.S. by Holly Near's Redwood Records.

== Production ==
Allen was backed on the album by the Canadian band the Parachute Club; the band's Billy Bryans produced the album. Lorraine Segato sang on "The Subversives". Allen asked her fans to help fund the album's production, which cost around $25,000.

== Critical reception ==
Professional ratings
Review scores
Source	Rating
AllMusic	4.5/5 stars
The Encyclopedia of Popular Music	3/5 stars
MusicHound World: The Essential Album Guide	4/5 stars

The Toronto Star called Allen's voice "a keening, irresistible instrument," writing that the tracks "deal with frighteningly recognizable contemporary issues, with Canadians' offensive condescension towards Jamaican immigrants, with rape, the pain of birth and the myriad small, shattering injustices perpetrated against blacks, the underprivileged and women both in this country and in Jamaica." The Kingston Whig-Standard declared that "Allen's poetry is a bracing jolt against complacency."

AllMusic called the album "a masterpiece of conscious female passion." Ms. included Revolutionary Tea Party on its 1991 list of landmark albums of the past 20 years.

== Track listing ==
No.	Title	Length
1.	"I Fight Back"
2.	"Nellie Belly Swelly"
3.	"Riddim an' Hardtimes"
4.	"Revolutionary Tea Party"
5.	"The Subversives"
6.	"Rub a Dub Style inna Regent Park"
7.	"Birth Poem"
8.	"Birth Version"
