= Northside Hip Hop Archive =

Canadian hip hop archive

Northside Hip Hop Archive (NSHHA) is a digital archive of Canadian hip hop culture from the 1980s and 1990s. NSHHA aims to preserve cultural artifacts from the pioneering years of the Canadian hip hop scene. This online archive digitizes oral histories, event flyers, posters, street magazines, album covers, newspaper articles, graffiti and analog recordings. Founded by Dr. Mark V. Campbell a.k.a. DJ Grumps, in 2010, NSHHA “take[s] seriously the accomplishments and hidden histories of Canadian hip hop and is interested in providing resources for future generations of hip hoppers.”

The archive’s funders include Canada Council for the Arts and Heritage Canada.

== History ==
Campbell was working on a chapter for a high school text book entitled Black History: Africa, the Caribbean and the Americas, when he realized that there was a dearth of information about the Canadian hip hop scene. The memorabilia of Canadian hip hop from before the internet age had not made its way online. He called on hip hop connections from his days as a community radio DJ to source artifacts that would document this music culture. Pioneering Canadian hip hop DJs, emcees, artists and producers contributed personal artifact collections to NSHHA.

T-dot Pioneers, an exhibition at Toronto Free Gallery, launched Northside Hip Hop Archive with an exhibition of plaques, awards, flyers, posters, newspaper articles, vinyl recordings, cassettes, clothing, comics, archival video from b-boy battles, and rare audio footage from community radio shows from across Canada.

== Exhibitions ==
=== For the Record: ‘An Idea of the North’ ===
In 2019, Northside Hip Hop put on the mixed media exhibition For the Record: ‘An Idea of the North’ Exhibit delineating the role soundsystems and DJs had in the emerging Toronto hip hop scene, in the TD Gallery at the Toronto Reference Library. CBC News writes: “The exhibit tracks the progress of Toronto's hip-hop scene and its growth through the last few decades when bboy battles, independent record labels and community college radio stations were the paths to success.”

=== Everything Remains Raw: Photographing Toronto’s Hip Hop Culture from Analogue to Digital ===
In 2018, NSHHA partnered with the McMichael Canadian Art Collection for the exhibition Everything Remains Raw: Photographing Toronto’s Hip Hop Culture from Analogue to Digital, which featured photos from Craig Boyko, Michael Chambers, Stella Fakiyesi, Demuth Flake, Patrick Nichols, Sheinina Raj, and Nabil Shash that documented the growth of the Canadian hip hop music scene.

The exhibition also featured artwork from painter David Strickland, video artist Mark Valino and graffiti writers Elicser, Eklipz, and EGR. The Globe and Mail made note of the juxtaposition of the Gallery, a “purveyor of Canadiana” and hip hop history:

When you visit the McMichael Canadian Art Collection in Kleinburg, before you spot a canvas, before you even touch a door handle, you'll pass by a small cemetery where six members of the Group of Seven are buried. That is to say: There are expectations about the kind of art you'll find there. And a paean to homegrown hip hop likely doesn't count first among them. But if the gallery is committed to its mission, the new exhibit ...Everything Remains Raw is exactly the sort of art it ought to showcase.

The exhibition was part of the Scotiabank CONTACT Photography Festival and is documented in Campbell's book Everything Remains Raw: Photographing Toronto's Hip Hop Culture from Analogue to Digital.

=== T-Dot Pioneers 2011: The Glenn Gould Remix ===
T-Dot Pioneers 2011: The Glenn Gould Remix was a photography exhibit that partnered with the Canadian Broadcasting Corporation to “visually intertwine Toronto’s hip hop history with the various commemorations of famed Canadian classical pianist Glenn Gould.”

== I Was There! Tour ==
In 2016, Northside Hip Hop went on the I Was There! Tour across four cities, highlighting Canadian hip hop icons: DJ Ron Nelson of Toronto; DJ Butcher T of Montreal; emcee Eekwol of Saskatoon and visual artist Eklipz of Hamilton.

Campbell told The Fader: "[I[n the '70s, this guy [Butcher T] was finding his own way to New York to just witness this thing called hip-hop. There was no marketing, no infrastructure — he was just a kid that was excited about what he saw, and he brought that back to Montreal.” He cited the children of Caribbean immigrants as the first, enthusiastic audiences for hip-hop stars from the U.S. such as Biz Markie, Run DMC and Queen Latifah who came to Canada to perform.
