= Alexis Baro =

Cuban-Canadian musician

Alexis Baró
- Born: Havana, Cuba
- Origin: Havana, Cuba
- Genres: Afro-Cuban, Latin, Caribbean, Jazz, Fusion
- Occupations: Musician, band leader, composer, arranger, educator
- Instrument: Trumpet
- Years active: 1996–present
- Label: G-THREE
- Website: www.alexisbaro.com

Alexis Baró is a Cuban-born Canadian trumpeter, composer, arranger, bandleader and educator based in Toronto, Ontario. His work encompasses jazz, Afro-Cuban music, Latin jazz and large-ensemble music. Baró has appeared on more than 200 recordings and has released eight albums as a leader.

In 2026, his album Afrokando, released in 2025 with Alexis Baró y La Big Band, was nominated for Jazz Album of the Year: Group at the 2026 Juno Awards. In 2026, Baró also received the Muriel Sherrin Award at the Toronto Arts Awards. The award celebrates artists who have made an outstanding contribution to the city’s performing arts landscape.

== Early life and education ==
Baró was born in Havana, Cuba, and grew up in the Pueblo Nuevo neighbourhood. He began playing trumpet at the age of eight. His early musical education took place at the Alejandro García Caturla Elementary Conservatory in Marianao, Havana. He then studied at the Amadeo Roldán Conservatory, where he completed a classical music education and obtained a teaching certification.

While still a student, Baró became a member of vocalist Omara Portuondo's band. Portuondo was subsequently associated internationally with the Buena Vista Social Club.

At the age of 19, Baró was appointed principal trumpet of Cuba's National Radio and Television Orchestra. The position gave him experience across classical, popular and broadcast music and established him as a professional musician in Cuba before his emigration to Canada.

== Career ==
Baró moved to Toronto in 2001. Soon after his arrival, he was introduced to Canadian jazz drummer Archie Alleyne, who recruited him for the Toronto-based hard-bop ensemble Kollage.. Baró remained with the group from 2001 to 2009, working as a trumpeter as well as a composer and arranger.

During his period with Kollage, Baró received recognition within the Canadian jazz community. He was nominated for Best Trumpeter at the Canadian National Jazz Awards, in 2005, 2006, 2007, and 2008.. He was also associated with a Juno Award and a Gemini Award for Best Live Television Performance during this period.

=== Discography ===
Baró established a career as a bandleader and recording artist. His albums have explored jazz, funk, Afro-Cuban music and other forms of Latin jazz while maintaining a connection to Cuban musical traditions.

The albums document an evolution from smaller-group jazz and Afro-Cuban fusion toward projects increasingly focused on Cuban musical history and large-ensemble composition.

His albums as a leader include:

- Havana Banana, 2004, his debut album as a bandleader.
- From the Other Side, 2009 Blends the Latin/Afro-Cuban jazz that defines Baró's roots with the funk-driven side of his musical world, bringing both into one energetic and groove-focused sound.
- Blue Skin, 2013 Traces a musical trajectory from the roots of Black music and the legacy of the blues to traditional and modern jazz, reframing that history through Baró's own jazz perspective.
- Guilty Pleasure, 2015 This laid-back “ballad” album is an intimate collection of mid- to slow-tempo songs with a soulful, sensual, and subtly sexy vibe.
- Sugar Rush, 2016 Introduced the Pueblo Nuevo Jazz Project, named after Baró's Havana neighbourhood. The project incorporated Cuban musical forms and traditions including rumba, abakuá, timba and danzón.
- Sandstorm, 2018, Juno nomination for Jazz Album of the Year, Solo The album explored contemporary urban and multicultural themes through jazz.
- Mi Raíz, 2022 Focused on the history of the Cuban trumpet and Baró's relationship to that tradition. The 12-track album brought together Cuban and Canadian musicians and included collaborations with musicians including Jesús Alemañy and Hilario Durán.
- Afrokando, 2025, Juno nomination for Jazz Album of the Year, Group Baró's debut as a big-band composer and arranger and represented a shift toward large-ensemble Afro-Cuban music. The project was conceived as a contemporary interpretation of the Afro-Cuban big-band tradition.

=== Performances and touring ===
Baró has performed at jazz festivals and concert series in Canada, the Caribbean, Europe and the United States. His Canadian festival appearances have included the Montreal International Jazz Festival, Ottawa Jazz Festival, TD Toronto Jazz Festival and Niagara Jazz Festival. He has also performed at the Trinidad & Tobago Jazz Festival, Jazz on the Greens in Trinidad and the Naniki Festival in Barbados.

At the Montreal Jazz Festival, Baró has performed on the main stage before an audience reported as exceeding 10,000 people. He has also opened for Herbie Hancock at the Ottawa Jazz Festival.

His international touring has included performances in South America and throughout the Caribbean. He has also worked in Europe with vocalist Dee Dee Bridgewater and drummer Dennis Chambers through the Made in NY Jazz concert series.

Baró has an ongoing collaboration with British trombonist Dennis Rollins that started with the Caribbean All Stars at the Naniki Festival in Barbados, followed with a performance at Lula World in Toronto, and the continuing project called Funk Unleashed.

His Juno Nominated album Afrokando was premiered on International Jazz Day at the “Jewel of the Canadian Broadcasting Centre" the Glenn Gould theatre in Toronto in early 2026. Mi Raiz was premiered at the historic Redwood Theatre in Toronto in 2024.

=== Collaborations ===
Baró has worked across jazz, Cuban music, popular music and Caribbean music. His documented collaborations include Paquito D'Rivera, Michael Bublé, Paul Anka, Andrea Bocelli and John Patitucci.

He has also performed and recorded with Hilario Durán, serving as lead trumpeter of the Hilario Durán Big Band and appearing on two of the ensemble's albums. In 2006, he appeared as a feature soloist on Hilario Durán's Grammy Award-nominated album From the Heart.

Baró has performed extensively Kiki Valera including the exciting performance at The Triple Door in Seattle Washington. Baró appears on Valera's 2019 album Vivencias en Clave Cubana and the Grammy nominated Vacilón Santiaguero in 2024.

His other collaborations include work with The Temptations, Tom Jones, and appearances as a featured trumpeter on Canadian Idol for six seasons.

Baró has maintained an active connection with Cuban musicians through collaborations with Juan de Marcos and the Afro-Cuban All Stars, Jesús Alemañy and Cubanismo, David Virelles, and Horacio "El Negro" Hernández.

His Caribbean collaborations include work with Trinidadian calypso musician David Rudder, with whom he toured in the United States and Trinidad, and American steel-pan musician Andy Narell.

Baró has collaborated with Grammy-winning drummer, composer and bandleader Larnell Lewis.

He has also performed and recorded with Jeremy Ledbetter, including ongoing performances globally as a member of Canefire for 2 decades traveling across Canada as well as internationally in South America, the Caribbean, and for three consecutive years at the Trinidad and Tobago Jazz Festival.

In addition to his work in jazz, he has also performed with the long-running rhythm and blues and funk combo Crack of Dawn and appeared with multiple award winner Magic!, a Canadian reggae fusion band famous for their single Rude.

Baró's more recent recording appearances include Joanna Majoko's Sunlight Sunshine (2023), Marito Marques's Eivissa (2024) and he is featured on Alessia Cara's 2026 album Love & Lack Thereof.

== Musical style ==
Baró's playing combines the vocabulary of contemporary jazz trumpet with Afro-Cuban rhythmic and melodic traditions. His recorded work has incorporated Cuban forms alongside jazz, funk and Latin-jazz influences.

Descriptions of his playing have emphasized his tone, technical facility and harmonic approach. Critics have compared aspects of his trumpet playing to Freddie Hubbard, Miles Davis and Arturo Sandoval. His muted trumpet playing has also been noted for its Davis-influenced phrasing.

As a composer and arranger, Baró has worked with both small and large ensembles. His big-band work on Afrokando places particular emphasis on the relationship between traditional Afro-Cuban orchestration and contemporary jazz arranging.

== Educator and mentor ==
Baró's teaching career developed alongside his work as a professional performer. His teaching certification was obtained during his studies at the Amadeo Roldán Conservatory. His educational work has focused in part on Cuban trumpet technique, Afro-Cuban music and jazz performance.

In Canada, he taught trumpet for approximately ten years at a Long & McQuade educational centre and provided private instruction for university-level music students in Toronto. He was also an Ensemble Teacher at Humber College.

For five years he conducted trumpet workshops and masterclasses at the Trinidad and Tobago Steel Pan and Jazz Festivals. Baró has also participated in the activities of the Hispanic-Canadian Arts and Culture Association and other educational and cultural programs.

== Awards and recognition ==
Year	Award	Category / recognition	Result
2005	Canadian National Jazz Awards	Best Trumpeter	Nominee
	Juno Award	Kollage	Co-winner
	Gemini Award	TV series Sue Thomas: F.B.Eye	Winner
2006	Canadian National Jazz Awards	Best Trumpeter	Nominee
2006	Grammy Awards	Featured soloist on Hilario Durán's album From the Heart	Winner
2007	Canadian National Jazz Awards	Best Trumpeter	Nominee
2008	Canadian National Jazz Awards	Best Trumpeter	Nominee
2019	Juno Awards	Jazz Album of the Year: Solo, Sandstorm	Nominee
2025	Grammy Awards	Featured soloist on Kiki Valera y Su Son Cubano's Vacilón Santiaguero	Nominee
2026	Juno Awards	Jazz Album of the Year: Group, Afrokando	Nominee
2026	Toronto Arts Awards	Muriel Sherrin Award	Winner
