= Ojigi =

Ojigi may refer to:

- Bowing in Japan
- Ojigi (Oyo), Yoruba king
- Ojiji (born 1955), Canadian musician
