= Split Personality (band) =

Canadian hip hop band

Split Personality was a Canadian hip hop band active in the 1990s, consisting of Jeremy Kerr and Andrew Gooden. They are most noted for their 1993 single "Try and Stop Us", which was a Juno Award nominee for Best Rap Recording at the Juno Awards of 1994.

Kerr and Gooden, both from the Jane and Finch area of Toronto, began their musical careers in an early, larger iteration of Dream Warriors. Although they were no longer members of that band by the time of its breakthrough album And Now the Legacy Begins, they produced the album tracks "Follow Me Not", "U Could Get Arrested" and "Do Not Feed the Alligators".

Their own album I Don't Know was released in 1993. In addition to "Try and Stop Us", the album included the single "Don't Stop Hip Hop".
