= My Definition =

My Definition may refer to:

- My Definition, an album by German electronic music DJ Tom Novy
- "My Definition of a Boombastic Jazz Style", a song by Dream Warriors on their album And Now the Legacy Begins, which repeatedly features the phrase "My Definition" in its chorus
