= Eria Fachin =

Canadian singer (1960–1996)

- Born: April 20, 1960
- Origin: Hamilton, Ontario, Canada
- Died: May 9, 1996 (aged 36) Oakville, Ontario, Canada
- Genres: dance-pop, Hi-NRG
- Occupation: singer
- Instrument: Vocals
- Years active: 1980s

Eria Fachin (April 20, 1960 – May 9, 1996) was a Canadian dance pop singer, best known for her 1988 single "Savin' Myself".

Originally from Hamilton, Ontario, Fachin began performing in the Toronto area at the age of 15 in a variety of capacities, including nightclub performances, roles in musical theatre, recording commercial jingles for local advertisers and performing on television variety shows. She also recorded a number of singles during this era, including "I'm Not Your Puppet", and married her musical collaborator Lou Bartolomucci in 1986.

Fachin released her debut album, My Name Is Eria Fachin, on Critique Records in 1988, and toured across Canada to support the album as an opening act for Candi and the Backbeat. Three singles were released from the album, "Savin' Myself", "Your Love Just Came Too Late" and a cover of The Supremes' "I Hear a Symphony".

"Savin' Myself", Fachin's biggest hit in Canada and internationally, peaked at No. 22 on the RPM charts the week of July 2, 1988, as well as reaching the top 15 in the magazine's adult contemporary charts. The song also peaked at No. 50 on the Billboard Hot 100 in the United States, and at No. 33 on the Hot Dance Club Songs chart.

"Your Love Just Came Too Late" reached at least No. 86 on the RPM charts, while "I Hear a Symphony" reached No. 5 on the magazine's dance charts in 1989. The latter song also finished No. 16 on the magazine's year-end rundown of top dance singles.

In 1990 she appeared on the one-off single "Can't Repress the Cause", a plea for greater inclusion of hip hop music in the Canadian music scene, with Dance Appeal, a supergroup of Toronto-area musicians that included Maestro Fresh Wes, Dream Warriors, Michie Mee, B-Kool, Lillian Allen, Devon, HDV, Dionne, Thando Hyman, Carla Marshall, Messenjah, Jillian Mendez, Lorraine Scott, Lorraine Segato, Self Defense, Leroy Sibbles, Zama and Thyron Lee White. She also had a modest hit on the RPM adult contemporary charts in 1991 with the non-album single "Hug You Hold You", written by Bartolomucci, and contributed vocals to the self-titled 1991 album by Bartolomucci's jazz band Synthetic Earth.

Fachin had begun work on her second album when she was diagnosed with cancer, and was forced to put her career on hold while pursuing treatment. The only further recording she ever released was the theme song to the Kiefer Sutherland film Woman Wanted. She died of cancer on May 9, 1996, in Oakville, at age 36.

== Discography ==
=== Albums ===
- My Name Is Eria Fachin (1988)

=== Singles ===
- 1988: "Savin' Myself"
- 1988: "Your Love Just Came Too Late"
- 1988: "I Hear a Symphony"
- 1990: "Can't Repress the Cause"
- 1991: "Hug You Hold You"
