= Dance Appeal =

Canadian supergroup

Dance Appeal was a politically-motivated supergroup of Canadian hip hop, reggae and soul music artists who recorded the 1991 single "Can't Repress the Cause". The song, a plea for greater inclusion of these predominantly black music genres in the Canadian music industry, was released as a direct response to the Canadian Radio-television and Telecommunications Commission's 1990 decision to deny an FM radio license to Milestone Radio for what would have become Canada's first urban music station; the single's title was intentionally chosen to result in the initialism "CRTC".

Participating artists included Maestro Fresh Wes, Dream Warriors, Michie Mee, B-Kool, Eria Fachin, Lillian Allen, Devon, HDV, Dionne, Thando Hyman, Carla Marshall, Messenjah, Jillian Mendez, Lorraine Scott, Lorraine Segato, Candy Pennella, Self Defense, Leroy Sibbles, Zama and Thyron Lee White.

The song received a Juno Award nomination for Best R&B/Soul Recording at the Juno Awards of 1991, and its video won the MuchMusic Video Award for Best Dance Video.
