= Soul Bossa Nova =

1962 instrumental by Quincy Jones

- Scandinavian release picture sleeve

Single by Quincy Jones

from the album Big Band Bossa Nova
- Released: December 20, 1962
- Recorded: September 7, 1962
- Studio: A & R Studios, New York City
- Genre: Jazz; soul; bossa nova
- Length: 2:50
- Songwriter: Quincy Jones
- Producer: Quincy Jones

"Soul Bossa Nova" is a popular instrumental, composed and first performed by American musician Quincy Jones. It appeared on his 1962 Big Band Bossa Nova album on Mercury Records.

Jones said that it took him twenty minutes to compose the piece, which features prominently a cuíca (responsible for the distinctive "laughing" in the first bars). Roland Kirk was the flute soloist, Lalo Schifrin was the pianist, Chris White was the bassist, Rudy Collins was the drummer, and Jerome Richardson was the alto flutist. The album liner notes do not specify the brass players.

== Media use ==
- The theme was used in a long-running Canadian television game show, Definition.
- Canadian hip hop group Dream Warriors sampled the title heavily for their popular track "My Definition of a Boombastic Jazz Style", in their debut album And Now the Legacy Begins in 1991.
- Canadian comedian Mike Myers used the song as the theme tune for his James Bond parody film series Austin Powers. The song was recommended to Myers by KCRW DJ Chris Douridas, a music consultant on the film series. Myers had a personal connection to the song, having been a fan of Definition as a child.
- It was used as a theme for the 1998 FIFA World Cup.
- It was sampled by Ludacris for his Austin Powers–themed single, "Number One Spot".
- In 2014, Jones executive produced Canadian jazz singer Nikki Yanofsky's album Little Secret, which featured a song entitled "Something New". The song interpolated melodic references to "Soul Bossa Nova".

== Charts ==
Chart performance
Chart (2026)	Peak position
Romania Airplay (UPFR)	5
