= Devon (rapper) =

- Also known as: Mr. Metro
- Born: Devon Martin; June 5, 1963; England
- Died: July 23, 2024 (aged 61) Vancouver, Canada
- Occupation: Rapper

Devon Martin (June 6, 1963 – July 23, 2024), better known mononymously as Devon, was an English-born Canadian rapper who rose to prominence in 1990 for his song titled "Mr. Metro", a controversial single about police racism. "Mr. Metro" subsequently became an alias of the artist.

== Early life ==
Devon was born in England, but raised in the Mississauga suburb of Malton, Ontario. He formed his first band, Shock Waves, at the age of 14, releasing an independent single in 1977. Later he was a member of the reggae band 20th Century Rebels, and served as a backing musician for Bong Conga Nistas, Messenjah, Judy Mowatt and Lillian Allen.

== Career during 1990s ==
=== "Mr. Metro" video ===
Although the title of his single "Mr. Metro" referred to the Toronto Police Service, the song was in fact inspired by incidents of police racism across North America, including his own detention by police in Redondo Beach, California, rather than in Toronto alone. Despite this, the Toronto Police Service threatened to arrest him on defamation charges, forcing him to black out parts of the video which might have been perceived as identifying Toronto police officers. The video went on to win a MuchMusic Video Award in 1990.

=== Other work ===
In 1990, he collaborated on the one-off single "Can't Repress the Cause", a plea for greater inclusion of hip hop music in the Canadian music scene, with Dance Appeal, a supergroup of Toronto-area musicians that included Maestro Fresh Wes, Dream Warriors, Michie Mee, B-Kool, Lillian Allen, Eria Fachin, HDV, Dionne, Thando Hyman, Carla Marshall, Messenjah, Jillian Mendez, Lorraine Scott, Lorraine Segato, Self Defense, Leroy Sibbles, Zama and Thyron Lee White.

After the song "Mr. Metro", Devon released his first solo album It's My Nature in 1992. The following year (1993), he won the Juno Award for Best Rap Recording with the album Keep It Slammin'.

In 1997, he relocated to Vancouver and signed to indie label Rated-R Recordz owned by Ray "Rated-R" Montani, a young man he was mentoring, where he released the EP and single both entitled Pressure, which were released in 1998, and feature Orin Isaacs.

== Death ==
Devon died in Vancouver on July 23, 2024, at the age of 61. The news was confirmed on social media by Devon's brother, comedian Jay Martin.
