= Lillian Allen =

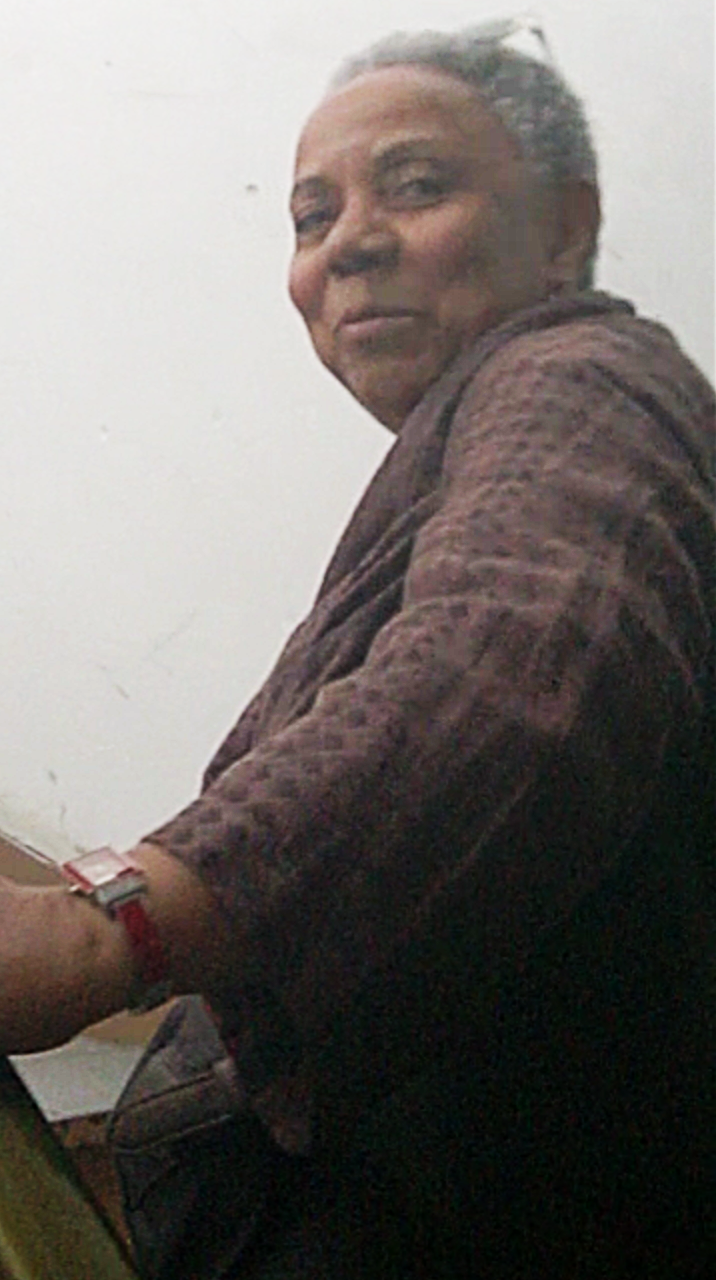

Background information
- Born: 5 April 1951 (age 75); Kingston, Jamaica
- Genres: Reggae; dub poetry
- Occupations: Poet; Singer-songwriter; writer; activist; Professor
- Instrument: Vocals
- Years active: 1969–present
- Label: Verse to Vinyl
- Website: www.lillianallen.ca

Lillian Allen (born 5 April 1951) is a Canadian dub poet, writer and Juno Award winner.

== Biography ==
Born in Spanish Town, Jamaica, she left that country in 1969, first moving to New York City, where she studied English at the City University of New York. She lived for a time in Kitchener, Ontario, before settling in Toronto, where she continued her education at York University, gaining a B.A. degree. After meeting Oku Onuora in Cuba in 1978, she began working in dub poetry. She released her first recording, Dub Poet: The Poetry of Lillian Allen, in 1983.

Allen won the Juno Award for Best Reggae/Calypso Album for Revolutionary Tea Party in 1986 and Conditions Critical in 1988.

In 1990, she collaborated on the one-off single "Can't Repress the Cause", a plea for greater inclusion of hip-hop music in the Canadian music scene, with Dance Appeal, a supergroup of Toronto-area musicians that included Devon, Maestro Fresh Wes, Dream Warriors, B-Kool, Michie Mee, Eria Fachin, HDV, Dionne, Thando Hyman, Carla Marshall, Messenjah, Jillian Mendez, Lorraine Scott, Lorraine Segato, Self Defense, Leroy Sibbles, Zama and Thyron Lee White. Two years later, she organized a collective of artists, including Ahdri Zhina Mandiela and Afua Cooper, prompting Toronto's First International Dub Poetry Festival.

In 2006, Allen and her work were the subject of an episode of the television series Heart of a Poet, produced by Canadian filmmaker Maureen Judge. She is a Faculty of Liberal Studies Professor at the Ontario College of Art and Design University, where she teaches creative writing. She recently held the distinction of being the first Canada Council Writer-in-Residence for Queen's University's Department of English. Allen also co-produced and co-directed Blak Wi Blakkk, a 1991 documentary about the Jamaican dub poet Mutabaruka.

In 2023, Allen was named to a three-year term as Poet Laureate of Toronto.

== Publications ==
- 1983 Rhythm an' Hardtimes
- 1984 The Teeth of the Whirlwind
- 1987 If You See Truth
- 1991 Why Me
- 1993 Women Do This Every Day
- 1993 Love & Other Strange Things (stage play)
- 1999 Psychic Unrest

== Discography ==
- Dub Poet: The Poetry of Lillian Allen (1983)
- De dub poets (1985)
- Curfew Inna B.C. (1985)
- Revolutionary Tea Party (1986)
- Let the Heart See (1987)
- Conditions Critical (1988)
- Nothing But a Hero (1992)
- Freedom & Dance (1999)
- Anxiety (European release) (2012)
