= Leroy Sibbles =

Jamaican reggae musician and producer (born 1949)

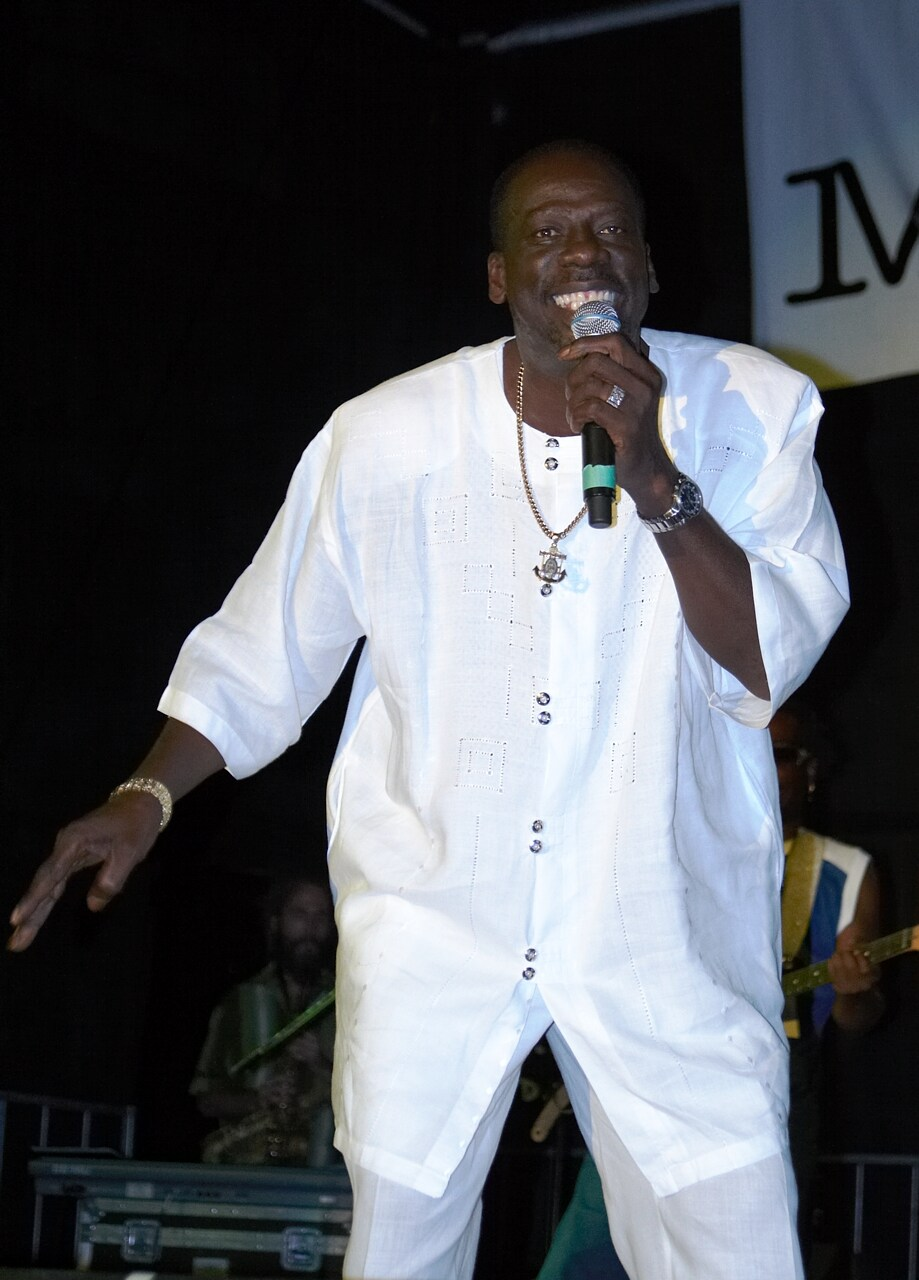
- Leroy Sibbles performing at the Irie Music Festival in Toronto, Ontario, 2006

Background information
- Born: 29 January 1949 (age 77)
- Origin: Jamaica
- Genres: Reggae
- Occupations: Singer-songwriter, musician
- Instruments: Vocals, bass guitar
- Years active: 1960s–present
- Labels: Studio One, Heartbeat, Trojan, Island, A&M, Micron
- Website: www.leroysibbles.com

Leroy Sibbles (born Leroy Sibblies, 29 January 1949) is a Jamaican reggae musician and producer. He was the lead singer for The Heptones in the 1960s and 1970s.

In addition to his work with The Heptones, Sibbles was a session bassist and arranger at Clement "Coxsone" Dodd's Jamaica Recording and Publishing Studio and the associated Studio One label during the prolific late 1960s. He was described as "the greatest all-round talent in reggae history" by Kevin O'Brien Chang and Wayne Chen in their 1998 book Reggae Routes.

== Biography ==
The son of a grocer, Sibbles began singing in the 1950s and also played guitar, having been taught by Trench Town Rastas Brother Huntley and "Carrot". Barry Llewellyn and Earl Morgan had formed The Heptones in 1958, and Sibbles was in a rival group along with two friends. Sibbles joined The Heptones in 1965 after the two groups competed in a street-corner contest.

The trio made their first recordings for Ken Lack in 1966 with "School Girls" and "Gun Man Coming to Town", the latter the A-side of their début single. Though the songs did not achieve hit status, the latter composition made the playlists at Radio Jamaica Rediffusion (RJR). They moved on to Clement "Coxsone" Dodd's Studio One where they stayed until 1971.

The Heptones were among the most influential groups of the rock steady era, along with the Pioneers, the Gaylads, the Paragons, the Uniques, and the Techniques. Signature Heptones songs included "Baby", "Get in the Groove", "Ting a Ling", "Fattie Fattie", "Got to Fight On (To the Top)", "Party Time", and "Sweet Talking". The group's Studio One output has been collected on albums The Heptones, On Top, Ting a Ling, Freedom Line, and the Heartbeat Records anthology, Sea of Love.

=== Studio One ===
Beyond his work as a singer-songwriter, Sibbles contributed to the collective output of Studio One as a bass player during the late 1960s. Keyboardist and arranger Jackie Mittoo encouraged Sibbles to play the bass when he needed a bassist for his jazz trio. Lloyd Bradley notes that as bass became more central than organ in Studio One's productions, Sibbles assumed an increasingly prominent musical role at the label, reflecting the shift from organ-led arrangements toward bass-driven rocksteady and reggae.

When Mittoo stepped back from full-time Studio One duties, Sibbles assumed increasing responsibility for arranging sessions and overseeing recordings, reflecting the growing importance of bass in rocksteady and reggae. Bradley describes Sibbles as a central figure in Studio One’s classic period, noting that beyond performing with the Heptones, he worked as a bassist, arranger, studio singer, talent scout, and repertoire selector, and was responsible for signing artists and shaping much of the label’s sound during the rocksteady era. Sibbles auditioned singers, arranged sessions, sang harmony, and played bass as a part of the studio group variously known as the Sound Dimension and Soul Vendors. These musicians, with engineering supervision Sylvan Morris, played backing tracks used by vocalists Bob Andy, Alton Ellis, Horace Andy, Carlton Manning, The Abyssinians, The Gladiators, Willi Williams, Ken Boothe, John Holt, Burning Spear, Dennis Brown, Slim Smith, and scores of others.

Sibbles was a contributor to tracks including "Freedom Blues" (which evolved into the Jamaican rhythm known as "MPLA") by Roy Richards, "Love Me Forever" by Carlton & The Shoes, "Satta Massagana" and "Declaration of Rights" by the Abyssinians, "Stars" and "Queen of the Minstrels" by The Eternals, "Ten to One" by the Mad Lads, "Door Peep (Shall Not Enter)" by Burning Spear, and the instrumental "Full Up", which was used by Musical Youth for their huge worldwide hit "Pass the Dutchie".

Because of the Jamaican process of versioning and the liberal recycling of rhythms in subsequent years, many of the songs, rhythms, and melodies written and recorded during the rocksteady era, the aforementioned in particular, continue to be referenced today. The most frequently referenced of Sibbles' bass lines is that found on the instrumental "Full Up", popularised internationally by Musical Youth's recording of "Pass the Dutchie", an adaptation of Mighty Diamonds' "Pass the Kouchie". Sibbles' legacy also endures in Horace Andy's tribute to him, "Mr. Bassie". (While Sibbles has been credited with the original "Real Rock" bassline, this was more likely performed by Boris Gardiner). The bass parts Sibbles and others developed in rocksteady used a rhythmic space found in later roots reggae, where the notes were not necessarily played or sustained on each downbeat of a 4/4 measure. Sibbles has explained that his style was to lag the downbeat slightly.

Other musicians involved in the Studio One rock steady sessions included Richard Ace and Robbie Lyn on keyboards; Bunny Williams, Joe Isaacs, and Fil Callendar on drums; Eric Frater and Ernest Ranglin on guitar; and the horn section of Felix "Deadly Headley" Bennett on saxophone and Vin Gordon (a.k.a. "Don D. Jr.") on trombone.

=== Work with other producers ===
After Studio One, Sibbles and the Heptones recorded for other producers including Lee Perry, Harry J, JoJo Hoo Kim, Niney The Observer, Clive Chin, Gussie Clarke, Lloyd Campbell, Prince Buster, Ossie Hibbert, Phil Pratt, Harry Mudie, Geoffrey Chung, Danny Holloway, Rupie Edwards, and Joe Gibbs.

Other Heptones releases from the early 1970s were Book of Rules (Trojan Records) and the Harry Johnson-produced album Cool Rasta (Trojan), recorded just before the group benefited from the internationalisation of reggae via Island Records. Danny Holloway produced Night Food and Lee "Scratch" Perry-produced Party Time were the fruit of the association with Island.

As a solo artist, Sibbles worked with Lloyd "Bullwackie" Barnes, Lloyd Parks, Sly & Robbie, Augustus Pablo, Bruce Cockburn, and Lee Perry, but primarily produced himself. Sibbles moved to Canada in 1973, where he married and remained for twenty years, and won a U-Know Award for best male vocalist in 1983, and a Juno Award for best reggae album in 1987. He left the Heptones in 1976, midway through a US tour. Also in Canada, he recorded an album for A&M and licensed several albums to Pete Weston's Micron label, including Now and Strictly Roots. In 1990 he collaborated on the one-off single "Can't Repress the Cause", a plea for greater inclusion of hip-hop in the Canadian music scene, with Dance Appeal, a supergroup of Toronto-area musicians that included Devon, Maestro Fresh Wes, Dream Warriors, B-Kool, Michie Mee, Lillian Allen, Eria Fachin, HDV, Dionne, Thando Hyman, Carla Marshall, Messenjah, Jillian Mendez, Lorraine Scott, Lorraine Segato, Self Defense, Zama and Thyron Lee White.

Sibbles continued to visit Jamaica, and performed at Reggae Sunsplash in 1980, 1981, 1983, 1986, and 1990. He returned to the Heptones in 1991. In 1996 he recorded "Original Full Up" with Beenie Man. Sibbles is featured in the 2009 documentary Rocksteady: The Roots of Reggae. He continued to perform and record into 2010.

=== Production work ===
Sibbles moved into production in 2009, and set up the Bright Beam record label. He has produced records by singer Sagitar and deejay Chapter, as well as his own recordings, including a successful cover version of "Harry Hippy".

== Solo discography ==
- Now (1980), Micron
- Strictly Roots (1980), Micron
- On Top (1982), Micron
- The Champions Clash (1985), Kingdom – with Frankie Paul
- Selections (1985), Leggo Sounds – also released as Mean While (1986), Attic
- It's Not Over (1995), VP
- Come Rock With Me (1999), Heartbeat
- Reggae Hit Bass Lines (2009), Ernie B
