= Crack of Dawn =

Canadian rhythm-and-blues band

- Origin: Toronto, Ontario, Canada
- Genres: R&B; funk; soul
- Years active: 1975–1977; 1980–1982; 2012–present
- Labels: Columbia; TTR; Ford Street
- Members: Rupert Harvey; Carl Harvey; Alexis Baro; Carl Otway; Michael Dunston; Bela Hajmann; Trevor Daley; Charles Sinclair; Alvin Jones
- Past members: Glen Ricketts; Grant Gabriel; Jackie Gabriel; Jacek Sobotta; Mark Smith; Dwight Gabriel; James (Jay) McGee; George Flint; Gary Steed; Andre King
- Website: crackofdawnband.com

Crack of Dawn is a Canadian band from Toronto, Ontario, which formed in the mid-1970s, performing R&B, funk, and soul music. The band is noted as the first Black Canadian band to sign with a major record label.

== History ==
Crack of Dawn was formed in Toronto in the mid-1970s by Grant Gabriel, his sister Jackie Gabriel (both originally from Springhill, Nova Scotia), Trevor Daley, Rupert Harvey, Mark Smith, Alvin Jones, and Carl Otway. When the Gabriel siblings left shortly after, the band added four new members: Harvey's brother Carl Harvey, lead singer Glen Ricketts, Jacek Sobotta, and Dwight Gabriel. Later on, Smith was briefly replaced by Andre King. Crack of Dawn gained a reputation for its live shows in the city's club scene, and while rehearsing in the Little Jamaica district one day, they were discovered by American producer Bob Gallo. After meeting with Gallo, the group signed a recording contract with Columbia Records in 1975.

In 1976, the group released its self-titled debut album, Crack of Dawn. The album spawned the hit single "It's Alright (This Feeling)", which peaked at #45 on Canada's RPM Singles Chart. Crack of Dawn supported the album with a countrywide tour and released three additional singles: "The Key", "Keep the Faith", and "Boobie Ruby". The following year, the band broke up after Columbia record executives convinced Ricketts to pursue a solo career, and attempted to convert the band from a horn section to a rhythm section.

In 1980, Dwight Gabriel relaunched Crack of Dawn as a four-man group, adding three new members: James (Jay) McGee, George Flint, and Gary Steed. McGee had previously recorded several hip hop singles under the stage name Mr. Q.

A new album, Horizons, was released the following year by TTR Records, however, it was only distributed in the Netherlands. The band released the single "If You Want to Groove" before disbanding in 1982.

Crack of Dawn reunited for a concert at Toronto's Harbourfront Centre in 2012. The group began working on a new album shortly after, with a lineup consisting of previous members Otway, the Harvey brothers, Daley, and Jones, as well as newcomers Alexis Baro, Bela Hajmann, Charles Sinclair, and lead singer Michael Dunston. In 2017, the group released the Spotlight album through Ford Street Records.

== Legacy ==
Crack of Dawn has the distinction of being the first African-Canadian band to sign with a major label, having joined Columbia in 1975. After the band's first break up, many members began solo careers or joined other groups. Rupert Harvey had a solo career under the stage name "Ojiji" and co-founded the reggae band Messenjah and Carl Harvey became lead guitarist for the ska and reggae band Toots and the Maytals. Ricketts began a solo career in R&B, though he later relocated to Jamaica and switched to reggae, recording under the stage name "Glen Ricks". Ricketts's son Glenn Lewis saw mainstream success as a neo soul singer in the early 2000s.

== Discography ==
- Crack of Dawn (1976)
- Horizons (1981)
- Spotlight (2017)
