= Subliminal Simulation =

Studio album by Dream Warriors
- Released: October 4, 1994
- Recorded: 1991 ("I've Lost My Ignorance"), 1993–1994
- Genre: Canadian hip hop, jazz rap
- Length: 51:46
- Label: Pendulum/EMI; 7243 8 30345 2 9 E2-30345
- Producer: Dream Warriors, 99, DJ Premier, Gang Starr, Black Katt, Butterfly, Da Grassroots Music, Billy Bryans

Dream Warriors chronology
And Now the Legacy Begins (1991)	Subliminal Simulation (1994)	The Master Plan (1996)

Singles from Subliminal Simulation
- 1. "Day in Day Out" Released: 1994; 2. "California Dreamin'" Released: 1995

Subliminal Simulation is the second studio album by Canadian hip hop group Dream Warriors, released in 1994 in Canada and worldwide in 1995, on EMI/Pendulum Records. The original duo, King Lou and Capital Q, expanded to include Spek and DJ Luv (Michie Mee's former DJ).

== Background ==
Following their well-received debut album, And Now the Legacy Begins, Dream Warriors' second effort featured appearances by Guru and DJ Premier of Gang Starr and Butterfly of Digable Planets. The collaboration "I've Lost My Ignorance" was originally released as a 12" single in 1991, though the album version has a different beat. Continuing the jazz rap trend, spoken word is performed during the interludes. The first single, "Day In Day Out", showcased the newest MC, Spek. The second single was "California Dreamin'".

== Reception ==
Professional ratings
Review scores
Source	Rating
AllMusic	2/5 stars
Q	3/5 stars
RapReviews	9/10
The Source	3/5 stars

The album received generally mixed reviews from music critics. Nin Chan of RapReviews wrote: "Dream Warriors successfully recreate the night-at-the-jazz-club feel championed by The Roots and classic Tribe". He also called the album a "landmark in Canadian hip-hop and hell, hip-hop in general." The Source's Nicholas Poluhoff called it "a positive and ambitious LP" that "may not have enough to truly stand out", highlighting two spoken word interludes, which he called "true gems". John Bush of AllMusic thought that "Dream Warriors' jazz-rap formula has run out of steam". The album was nominated for Best Rap Recording at the 1995 Juno Awards.

== Track listing ==
#	Title	Producer(s)	Featured guest(s)	Length
1.	"Intro"	Dream Warriors		0:29
2.	"Are We There Yet"	Dream Warriors		3:15
3.	"Day In Day Out"	Dream Warriors		3:55
4.	"Adventures of Plastic Man"	99 and Dream Warriors	99	1:09
5.	"It's a Project Thing"	DJ Premier		4:24
6.	"Paranoia – The "P" Noise"	Dream Warriors		2:59
7.	"I've Lost My Ignorance"	Dream Warriors and Gang Starr	Guru	3:33
8.	"Break the Stereo"	Dream Warriors		4:45
9.	"When I Was at the Jam"	Black Katt	Black Katt	1:34
10.	"Burns 1"	99	99	1:52
11.	"Tricycles and Kittens"	Dream Warriors and Butterfly	Butterfly	5:22
12.	"California Dreamin'"	Dream Warriors		5:04
13.	"No Dingbats Allowed"	Da Grassroots Music and Dream Warriors		4:14
14.	"You Think I Don't Know"	Black Katt	Black Katt	1:22
15.	"Sink into the Frame of the Portrait"	Billy Bryans and Dream Warriors		3:36
16.	"I Wouldn't Wanna Be Ya"	Dream Warriors		3:43
17.	"Outro"	Dream Warriors		0:30

== Samples ==
- "Are We There Yet" – Contains a sample of "Elevation" by Pharoah Sanders
- "Day In Day Out" – Contains a sample of "All the Way Lover" by Millie Jackson
- "I've Lost My Ignorance" – Contains a sample of "Blackjack" by Donald Byrd and "Down by the River" by Buddy Miles
- "California Dreamin'" – Contains samples of "Go on and Cry" by Les McCann and "La Di Da Di" by Doug E. Fresh and Slick Rick
- "Break the Stereo" – Contains a sample of "Funky" by the Chambers Brothers
- "Tricycles and Kittens" – Contains samples of "Another Opus" by Lem Winchester and "Zimba Ku" by Black Heat

== Release history ==
Region	Date
Canada	1994
United Kingdom	February 1, 1995
United States	April 25, 1995

== Personnel ==
- Alfio Annibalini – Assistant Engineer
- Beans – Producer
- Tim Bran – Engineer, Mixing
- Derek Brin – Programming, Producer, Engineer, Mixing
- Billy Bryans – Producer
- Butterfly – Remixing, Assistant Producer
- Tom Coyne – Mastering
- DJ Premier – Producer, Mixing
- Dream Warriors – Producer, Mixing
- G-Spot – Engineer
- Gang Starr – Vocals, Producer
- Tom Garneau – Assistant Engineer
- Rupert Gayle – Executive Producer
- Bruce Grant – Engineer, Mixing
- Huge Voodoo – Producer
- Orin Isaacs – Bass, Engineer
- Black Katt – Poetry, Producer
- Dennis Kelly – Engineer, Mixing
- NinetyNine – Poetry, Producer
- Eddie Sancho – Engineer
- Walter Sobczak – Producer, Engineer, Mixing
- Max Vargas – Engineer
- David Williams – Keyboards
