= Red Rat =

Jamaican dancehall reggae artist

Wallace Wilson (born 17 January 1978), better known by the stage name Red Rat, is a Jamaican dancehall reggae recording and performing artist. He is known for his up-beat music, comical style, and signature catch phrase "Oh, no!"

== Early life ==
Wilson was born in Saint Ann's Bay, Saint Ann Parish, Jamaica.

Wilson's father was the guitarist of Byron Lee & the Dragonaires, and two of his older brothers were also professional musicians.

Red Rat's debut album, Oh, No.. It's Red Rat (1997), featured songs such as "Shelly Ann", "Dwayne", "Tight-Up Skirt", "Cruise" (featured in the movie The Big Hit), and "Big Man, Little Yute". It became one of the best selling records from Greensleeves Records.

His second album, I'm a Big Kid Now, followed in 2000, with more hits and critical acclaim. His musical diversity and mainstream popularity led to a series of collaborations with artists such as Treach of Naughty by Nature, Kele Le Roc, Renee from Zhane, NEXT, British electronic group Groove Armada and his cousin, Canadian hip-hop artist, Dan-e-o. Recently, Red Rat reemerged back in the media with his new hit, "Rise up, Zimbabwe" which was a joint project with ABRA (African Bread Recording Artists). The song was released in April 2010 and immediately saw popularity in the music fans of Zimbabwe.

In 2009, Red Rat rebranded himself and was offered an opportunity to become the President of A&R/Musical Director at an independent record label called Infinity Moguls Inc. He began working with a young female artist named Pascalle, who is his business partner with Infinity Moguls. Pascalle performed with him all over the world. He began to coach her personally. Red Rat then went on to collaborate with Dan-e-o, his cousin, a Toronto-based rapper, the song also featured Pascalle, called "Hoo Yuh Want?" Followed by Red Rat, Infinity Moguls teamed up with ABRA in 2010, for the release of "Rise Up, Zimbabwe" which became an anthem. Red Rat revisited the Central America market, where Infinity Moguls partnered with Ruff and Tuff on another song that became Pascalle's single "HAUTE" featuring Red Rat and Toledo. The song was released in 2016, and quickly topped the Caribbean charts.

In 2016 Red Rat teamed up with DJ Buddha to create an EDM/dancehall/moombahton fused song called "Higher" featuring an up-and-coming artist called dEvolve which was released in September 2016 and became one of the fastest song to get over three million streams on Spotify in less than three months.

== Discography ==
- Oh, No.. It's Red Rat (1997), Greensleeves
- I'm a Big Kid Now (2000), Greensleeves
- Monsters of Dancehall (2008), Greensleeves
