= Carl Harvey =

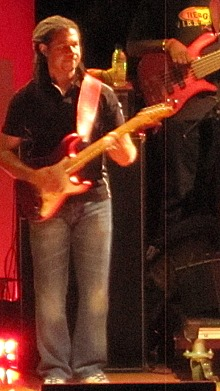
- Performing with Toots & the Maytals, 2011

Background information
- Born: 1 October 1958 (age 68); Jamaica
- Origin: Toronto, Ontario, Canada
- Genres: Reggae, funk, soul
- Occupations: Guitarist, record producer
- Instrument: Guitar
- Years active: 1970s–present
- Website: carlharvey.net

Carl Harvey (born 1 October 1958) is a Jamaican born Canadian guitarist and record producer who recorded as a member of Crack of Dawn and The Aggrovators in the 1970s, and later became guitarist for Toots & the Maytals.

== Early life and education ==
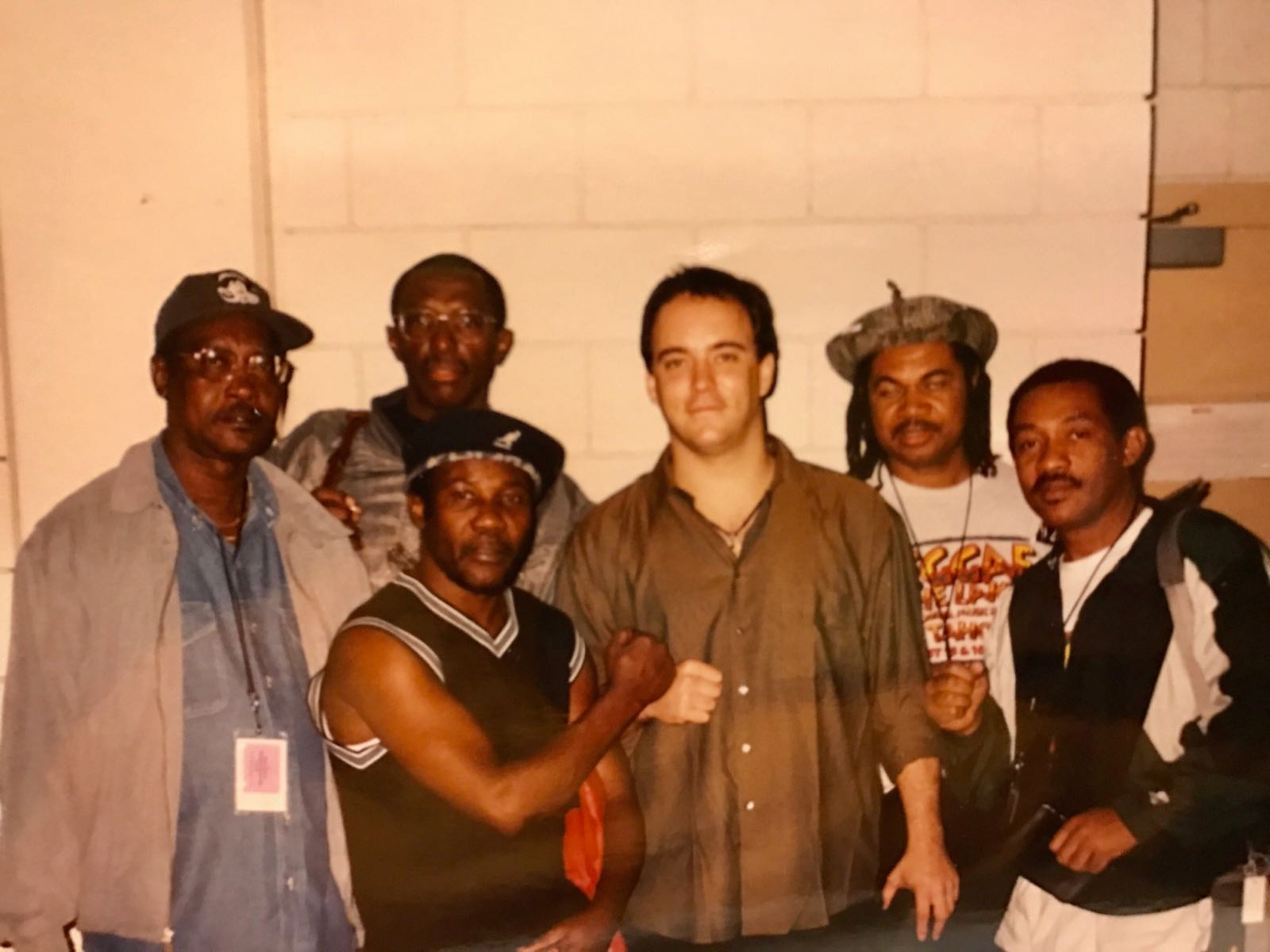
Toots and the Maytals with Dave Matthews when performing together in 1998

Harvey was born in Jamaica and emigrated to Toronto, Ontario, Canada with his family at an early age. He began playing guitar aged 13 and also played the tuba at school.

== Career ==
After listening to music by Jimi Hendrix, Harvey joined the Toronto funk and soul band Crack of Dawn, which was signed by Columbia Records and had hits in Canada with "It's Alright" and "Keep the Faith" in 1976. In the mid-1970s, Harvey visited Jamaica regularly and recorded as a member of Bunny Lee's house band The Aggrovators, playing on albums such as Kaya Dub, Jackie Mittoo's In Cold Blood and King in the Arena, and also played guitar on Willi Williams' Messenger Man. In 1978, he went into the studio with Lee to record several tracks where he played improvised guitar over some of Lee's classic rhythms. These were released in 1979 as the album Ecstasy of Mankind on the British label Cancer. Although the record was unavailable for many years, it was released by Rhino Records in 1994, who sold it as a Lee "Scratch" Perry album, under the title Guitar Boogie Dub. The album was given a wider release, with correct title and credits, in 2005 by Makasound Records.

In the 1980s, Harvey became the lead guitarist of Toots & the Maytals, and has been with the band for over twenty-five years. The band performed internationally, including in the United States and the United Kingdom.

Harvey also toured with his own band, with Jackie Mittoo, and worked as a record producer, producing four albums by Messenjah (two of which were nominated for Juno Awards), and recordings by the Juno-winning Kim Richardson and Sway. He later played lead guitar in Messenjah.

Harvey released a second solo album, The Times, in 2005.

== Solo discography ==
- Ecstasy of Mankind (1979), Cancer
- The Times (2005) - Carl Harvey (credited to Carl Harvey & Friends)
- Unleashed EP (2012) - Carl Harvey Project
