= Dan-e-o =

- Born: Daniel Faraldo; June 10, 1977 (age 49)
- Origin: Toronto, Ontario, Canada
- Genre: Hip-hop
- Occupations: Rapper, songwriter, record producer, actor
- Years active: 1991–present
- Labels: Planet Rock Records; Urbnet Records
- Member of: Monolith; Perfeck Strangers
- Website: https://urbnet.com/dan-e-o

Daniel Faraldo (born June 10, 1977), in Toronto, known professionally as Dan-e-o, is a Canadian rapper, record producer and actor of Jamaican and Spanish descent. He is a member of the groups Monolith and Perfeck Strangers, both based in Scarborough, Ontario.

== Career ==
=== Early career ===
In May 1991, Dan-e-o won a contest on the television dance show, Electric Circus, at the age of 13 and won a rap-off competition. The win sparked his career as a professional hip-hop artist. In 1994 he was featured in Andrew Munger's documentary film Make Some Noise. His recording career was officially launched in 1996 when his first single "Dear Hip Hop" was featured on Beat Factory/EMI's, Rap Essentials Volume One compilation. The track is now considered by many to be a Canadian hip-hop classic. Dan-e-o helped to establish his crew, Monolith in 1997 by co-founding One Rock Records and independently releasing the EP, The Long Awaited... the following year. With two videos, "At The T.O.P." and "Plan Eh", this project helped put Dan-e-o and the 12-member Monolith crew permanently on the hip-hop map.

=== Album releases ===
In 2000, Dan-e-o released his debut album, The Book of Daniel on the same label. It includes the singles "Corrida De Toros", "Margerine" and "Baahd!".

In 2004, he released the See No Evil, Hear No Evil album on the newly named Planet Rock Records imprint. Singles from the album include "T.N.T.", "Funkbox", "Deadly" and "Kama Sutra" which features Dan-e-o's cousin and dancehall star, Red Rat. Its music video currently has over 8 million views on YouTube. This album featured a hybrid style which composed of funk, soul, reggae and rock along with Dan-e-o's freestyle lyricism.

On Planet Rock Records, Dan-e-o released Dear Hip Hop in 2004, containing recordings from the 90s and Speak No Evil in 2005, a remix edition of his sophomore effort.

On January 9, 2009, Dan-e-o, as part of Tha O Show, released OBLIVION! Tha Indy Wrestling Album, an album containing theme songs of several Ontario indy professional wrestlers that features performances from himself, T.J. Habibi, Chemist, Tika Simone and Summer Brockwell.

In November 2009, Dan-e-o released a 2 in 1 album/mixtape entitled Dilla Pickles in honor of the late hip-hop producer, J Dilla. The project contains such tracks as "Break It Down", "Last Minute" and "Locked" and includes performances by himself, Famous, Ian Kamau, marveL, Promise and others.

In 2012, together with Promise, Dan-e-o released his first album as part of the duo, Perfeck Strangers entitled Series Premiere on Urbnet Records.

In 2013, Dan-e-o released an EP Immortal and an album Inevitable through Urbnet Records. For these projects, he worked with such artists as Moka Only, Big Kish, Maestro Fresh-Wes, Red Rat, Pascalle, Chip Fu and Rich Kidd.

In 2014, Dan-e-o finally released the Dear Hip Hop album as a vinyl-only release through France's Sergent Records. In 2017, Urbnet Records released a deluxe version of the album entitled Dear Hip Hop: 20 Years Later to commemorate the two-decade milestone of the release of Dan-e-o's debut single.

In 2019, Dan-e-o released his fifth solo album, The Day It All Changed, an ode to his daughter, Melina, who appears on the album cover with him.

In 2024, he released his sixth solo album, Vigilante, which was themed around social commentary.

=== Rap competitions and awards ===
Dan-e-o won the Darknights Freestyle Battle in July 2003 in Markham, Ontario, defeating Detroit's Swann in the finals.

On June 6, 2015, Dan-e-o won the Best Hip Hop Artist award at the Black Canadian Awards in Toronto, Ontario.

=== Tha O Show ===
In mid-February 2006, Dan-e-o joined with friend, Big Daddy Donnie to launch Tha O Show, a website based in Toronto. In the beginning, it consisted of articles and weekly reviews of professional wrestling and mixed martial arts shows, but later on would turn into what the pair had envisioned all along: a weekly online radio program that broadcasts on Tha O Show's website and on dozens of affiliate sites. The show carved out a niche as a unique radio property, catering to an audience that loves wrestling and MMA, but wanted to hear about other things as well. The show often featured an in-studio guest or co-host who was a professional wrestler, as well as guests on the phone. Dan-e-o also wrote and performed the lyrics to Gangrel's entrance theme during this time. Tha O Show avoids typical "interview" format and instead strives for a more conversational approach - best noted by their Round Table segment. Dan-e-o stepped down in June 2012 as official co-host of Tha O Show, being replaced by professional wrestler and Big Daddy Donnie's former co-host on Live Audio Wrestling, Notorious T.I.D.. Tha O Show officially went off the air by the end of 2013. In March 2020, amid the coronavirus pandemic, Donnie, Tid and Dan reunited with a new podcast known as "The Godfathers of Podcasting".

=== Acting career ===
With a number of TV commercials under his belt, Dan-e-o (using his real name, Daniel Faraldo) landed a bit role in an episode of the A&E series, Breakout Kings in 2011, played a key role in his first full-length movie, Anything Goes that same year and starred in 2014's Tapped Out. His next feature-length film, titled Lifechanger was released in 2018. In 2023, he appeared in the Disney + film, World’s Best. In 2026, he appeared in the series SkyMed and I Will Find You.

== Discography ==
Solo albums/mixtapes

- The Book of Daniel (2000)
- Dear Hip Hop (2000)
- See No Evil, Hear No Evil (2004)
- Speak No Evil (2005)
- The Art Of Lyricism: Dan-e-o's Finest (2007)
- Dilla Pickles (2009)
- The Book of Daniel (10 Year Anniversary Mixtape) (2010)
- Immortal (2013)
- Inevitable (2013)
- Dear Hip Hop: 20 Years Later (2017)
- The Day It All Changed (2019)
  - The Day It All Changed (Lockdown Remixes) (2020)
- Vigilante (2024)

Collaborations

- Monolith - The Long Awaited...EP (1998)
- Monolith - Welcome To Scarborough (2006)
- Monolith - The Long Awaited (10 Year Anniversary) (2008)
- The O Show - OBLIVION! Tha Indy Wrestling Album (2009)
- Perfeck Strangers - Series Premiere (2012)

Guest appearances

- "Dear Hip Hop" - Rap Essentials Volume One (1996)
- "Dear Hip Hop" - World Of Rap Volume 2 (1997)
- "Elements" - La Constellation - Dualité (1998)
- "At The T.O.P." (as Monolith) - Prime Time The Original Soundtrack (1999)
- "Revenge" - Fit For Survival Volume 1 (2000)
- "Corrida De Toros" - Rap Essentials 2000 (2000)
- "No Delay" - Mastermind - Volume 49: The Set Up (2000)
- "Let's Make A Record Deal Episode 2" (as Monolith) - Mastermind - Volume 50: Street Legal (2000)
- "Margerine" - RapEssentials 2001 (2001)
- "Baahd!", and "Yuh Ded Now" - Urbnet.com/hiphopmix V1 (2001)
- "Yuh Ded Now" - Classified - Union Dues (2001)
- "The Best Posse Cut You Ever Heard" - Abdominal & DJ Fase - Flowtation Device (2001)
- Underground Hip Hop Volume 1 (2002)
- "Lift Off" - IRS - Welcome To Planet Irs (2003)
- "Don’t Believe" and Remix - Divo - The Evolution Theory (2003)
- Jack Hammer Vol.1 - Blazin' 04 (2004)
- Jack Hammer Vol 2. - Wickedness Baahdness (2004)
- Arythmetic - The Mixtape (2004)
- Grimace Love - Fire In The Streets Vol.1 (2004)
- Nish Raawks - Buck Canuck (2004)
- Underground Hip Hop Vol.3 (2005)
- Grimace Love - Fire In The Streets Vol.2 (2005)
- Yor123 & Skandaali - Round The World (2005)
- Rishaard - Confessions Of A Prick!? (2006)
- Dub J - Love 2 Hate Vol.1 (2006)
- DJ Law - Northern Exposure Vol.1 (2007)
- Grimace Love - The Zig Zag Man (2007)
- "Ten" - Wio-K - In Real Life (2007)
- “Summer Fling” - The Bakery Mixtape (2008)
- 10 The Music Videos DVD (2008)
- "Anywhere" - Grimace Love - Perception (2009)
- "Yesterday" - 2010 Canadian Rap Future Superstars (2010)
- Hip Hop Lives Vol.2 - The Addiction (2009)
- Ian Kamau - September Nine Mixtape Vol.2 (2009)
- Tru North Risin' Vol.1 (2010)
- "Overcast" - Ron Contour - Rontario (2010)
- "Strong Hold" - Sikadime - Carpe Noctem (2010)
- The Borough Most Thorough (2010)
- Phase 2 Collective - Devastating (2011)
- Spesh K - BSH Warm Up Show (2011)
- Sep & Khan Soulo - The Nightmare Project (2011)
- Underground Hip-Hop Volume 7 (2011)
- “Dear Hip Hop (Return to Sender)” - S-KY THE COOKINJAX - ReMAKIN' (2012)
- SepTo - T.O. For Toronto (2012)
- "Stay Me" (as Perfeck Strangers) - URBNET Certified Vol. 2 (2012)
- "Heavy Auxillary" - iLLvibe - Proof Of Life (2014)
- “Pity Party” - L.I.U. - 2 Raw 4 Tha Radio (2014)
- "Let It Go" - Blaq Roche - Project: Blaq Roche (2014)
- "Drive" - Underground Hip Hop Vol.8 (2015)
- "Gotta Vibe" - Divo & GMJ - Transatlantic Soul (2015)
- "Criddown" - Ultra Magnus & DJ SLAM! - Magnus Opus (2016)
- "Nitty Gritty" and "Sunshine" - S-KY THE COOKINJAX - Still' (2019)
- “Hot Popsicles” - V.A. HOW MANY BEATZ 03' (2020)
- "Rap Como Standarte" - Ranaman - Tabula Rasa' (2020)
