= Mark V. Campbell =

Canadian academic, disc jockey, writer

- Born: 1978 (age 47–48)
- Other name: DJ Grumps

Academic background
- Education: University of Toronto
- Thesis: Remixing Relationality: 'Other/ed' Sonic Modernities of our Present (2010)

Academic work
- Discipline: Musicologist; Black studies scholar
- Sub-discipline: Afrodiasporic music; hip-hop archives; remix cultures
- Institutions: University of Toronto
- Website: https://markvcampbell.ca/

Mark V. Campbell (born 1978) is a Canadian academic, disc jockey (stage name DJ Grumps) and writer. He was raised in Scarborough, Ontario. He is an associate professor, Associate Chair of Research and Program Director of Music at University of Toronto Scarborough. Campbell's work focuses on conceptions of the human and sonic innovations within Black music.

== Career ==
Campbell was the 2020-21 Jackman Humanities Institute Fellow and a Connaught New Researcher Fellow at the University of Toronto. Campbell was formerly Senior Research Associate of the FCAD Forum for Cultural Strategies and adjunct professor at the School of Media, Toronto Metropolitan University.

Campbell was a Banting Postdoctoral Fellow in the Faculty of Fine Arts at the University of Regina. He is a research and former postdoctoral fellow with the International Institute for Critical Studies in Improvisation, University of Guelph.

Campbell is affiliated with the Association of Canadian Archivists and the American Musicological Society.

=== Northside Hip Hop Archive ===
He is the founder of the Northside Hip Hop Archive, an online archive started in 2010 that digitizes oral histories, event flyers, posters and analog recordings that document the beginnings of Canadian hip-hop in the 1980s and 1990s.

=== Exhibitions ===
Campbell has curated several exhibitions of Canadian hip-hop archival material: Still Tho: Aesthetic Survival in Hip Hop's Visual Art at the Âjagemô Exhibition Space at the Canada Council for the Arts; ...Everything Remains Raw: Photographing Toronto’s Hip Hop Culture from Analogue to Digital at the McMichael Canadian Art Collection; For the Record: ‘An Idea of the North’ at the TD Gallery at the Toronto Reference Library; Mixtapes: Hip Hop’s Lost Archive at Gallery 918; T-Dot Pioneers 3.0: The Future Must be Replenished at Soho Lobby Gallery; T-Dot Pioneers 2011: The Glenn Gould Remix at the Glenn Gould Studio at the Canadian Broadcasting Centre; T-Dot Pioneers 2010 at the Toronto Free Gallery.

=== DJ work ===
Campbell became a disc jockey in 1994 and co-hosted the Bigger than Hip-Hop Show on community radio from 1997 to 2015.

=== Published academic work ===
Campbell published Afrosonic Life in 2022 which focuses on “the role sonic innovations in the African diaspora play in articulating methodologies for living the afterlife of slavery.”

== Selected publications ==
- 2025: Hip-Hop Archives The Politics and Poetics of Knowledge Production (co-editor), Intellect Books
- 2022: Afrosonic Life, Bloomsbury Academic
- 2020: We Still Here: Hip Hop North of the 49th Parallel (co-editor), McGill–Queen's University Press
- 2018: ...Everything Remains Raw: Photographing Toronto Hip Hop Culture from Analogue to Digital, Goose Lane Editions
