= Rap Essentials Volume One =

Compilation album by Various Artists
- Released: 1996
- Recorded: 1995–1996
- Genre: Canadian hip hop
- Length: 46:40
- Label: Beat Factory/EMI Canada
- Producers: DJ Kemo, Scam, Down ta Erf, Kardinal Offishall, DRK, DJX, Swiff, DJ Luv, Kandu, Day, Kwajo Cinqo

Various Artists chronology
Rap Essentials Volume One (1996)	Rap Essentials Volume Two (1997)

Rap Essentials Volume One is a Canadian hip hop compilation album, released in 1996 on Beat Factory Music, and distributed by EMI Music Canada. It is considered a landmark hip-hop album, and was very influential in Canada.

Three songs from the album—"Naughty Dread" by Kardinal Offishall, "Fitnredi" by Rascalz, and "Bright Lights, Big City" by Scales Empire—were nominated for Best Rap Recording at the 1997 Juno Awards. "Dear Hip Hop" by Dan-e-o is considered a Canadian hip-hop classic.

Music videos for "Dear Hip Hop", "Bright Lights, Big City", and "Sunlight" by Wio-K were put into rotation on MuchMusic.

== Track listing ==
#	Title	Performer(s)	Producer(s)	Length
1.	"Fitnredi"	Rascalz	DJ Kemo	4:29
2.	"Boiling Point"	Concrete Mob	Scam	3:17
3.	"Learn to Earn"	Down ta Erf	Down ta Erf	3:25
4.	"Naughty Dread"	Kardinal Offishall	Kardinal Offishall	4:24
5.	"No Lawz"	Black-I	DRK	4:23
6.	"Sunlight"	Wio-K	DJX	3:42
7.	"Who's Talking Weight (Remix)"	Red Life	Swiff	3:46
8.	"Dear Hip Hop"	Dan-e-o	Scam	3:24
9.	"Bright Lights, Big City"	Scales Empire	DJ Luv, Kandu (co-producer)	4:00
10.	"Twenty One Years"	Choclair	Day	4:17
11.	"Structure, Foundation (What's the Plan)"	Citizen Kane	Down to Erf	3:14
12.	"U.L."	Ghetto Concept	Kwajo Cinqo	4:24

== Samples ==
- "Learn to Earn" – Contains a sample of "Paid in Full" by Eric B. & Rakim
- "Naughty Dread" – Contains a sample of "Natty Dread" by Bob Marley & The Wailers
- "Dear Hip Hop" – Contains a sample of "The Look of Love" by Ramsey Lewis
- "Structure Foundation" – Contains a sample of "Salt Song" by Stanley Turrentine (1:56)

== See also ==
- Canadian hip hop
- Music of Canada
