= Crack ov Dawn =

French glam metal band

- Origin: France
- Genres: Industrial, glam rock
- Years active: 2002–2007
- Label: Equilibre Music
- Members: Britney Beach; Sexy Sadie; Spicy Sky; Mallaury Murder; Xander Abby Xanax
- Past members: Vinnie Valentine (2002–2005)

Crack ov Dawn is a French glam metal band founded in 2002. Crack ov Dawn split up in 2007.

== History ==
The band was founded in January 2002 in Paris, France, by guitarist Sexy Sadie and vocalist Vinnie Valentine. Soon after, they joined up with vocalist and multi-instrumentalist Britney Beach. The next six months were spent rehearsing and writing material for the new band.

In Summer of 2003, Vinnie and Britney met Mallaury Murder after being thrown out of a Parisian club and recruited him as bassist. Xander Xanax, an old friend of Mallaury Murder, took the position of drummer, soon joined by Spicy Sky on guitars. The band soon signed with Equilibre Music, and released their debut album, "Dawn Addict" in 2004.

Songwriters Sexy Sadie and Britney Beach like to describe the band's music as 'Shock-Pop', a style which combines electronic beats, heavy metal riffs and pop sounds with Gothic Glam and '70 Punk/Shock-Rock.

Vinnie Valentine left the band in 2005, and the rest of the band continued without him, releasing "White Line" in June 2006.

Ex-vocalist Vinnie Valentine (a.k.a. RMS Hreidmarr) has also sung for the black metal band Anorexia Nervosa and is currently in the industrial metal band The CNK.

== Discography ==
- Dawn Addict, 2004 Equilibre Music
- White Line, 2006 Equilibre Music

== Videography ==
The music video "From My Shades" of the album "White Line" was shot in 2006 by Matador Films and directed by Franck Védrines.
