= Lorraine Segato =

Canadian singer

Lorraine Segato CM
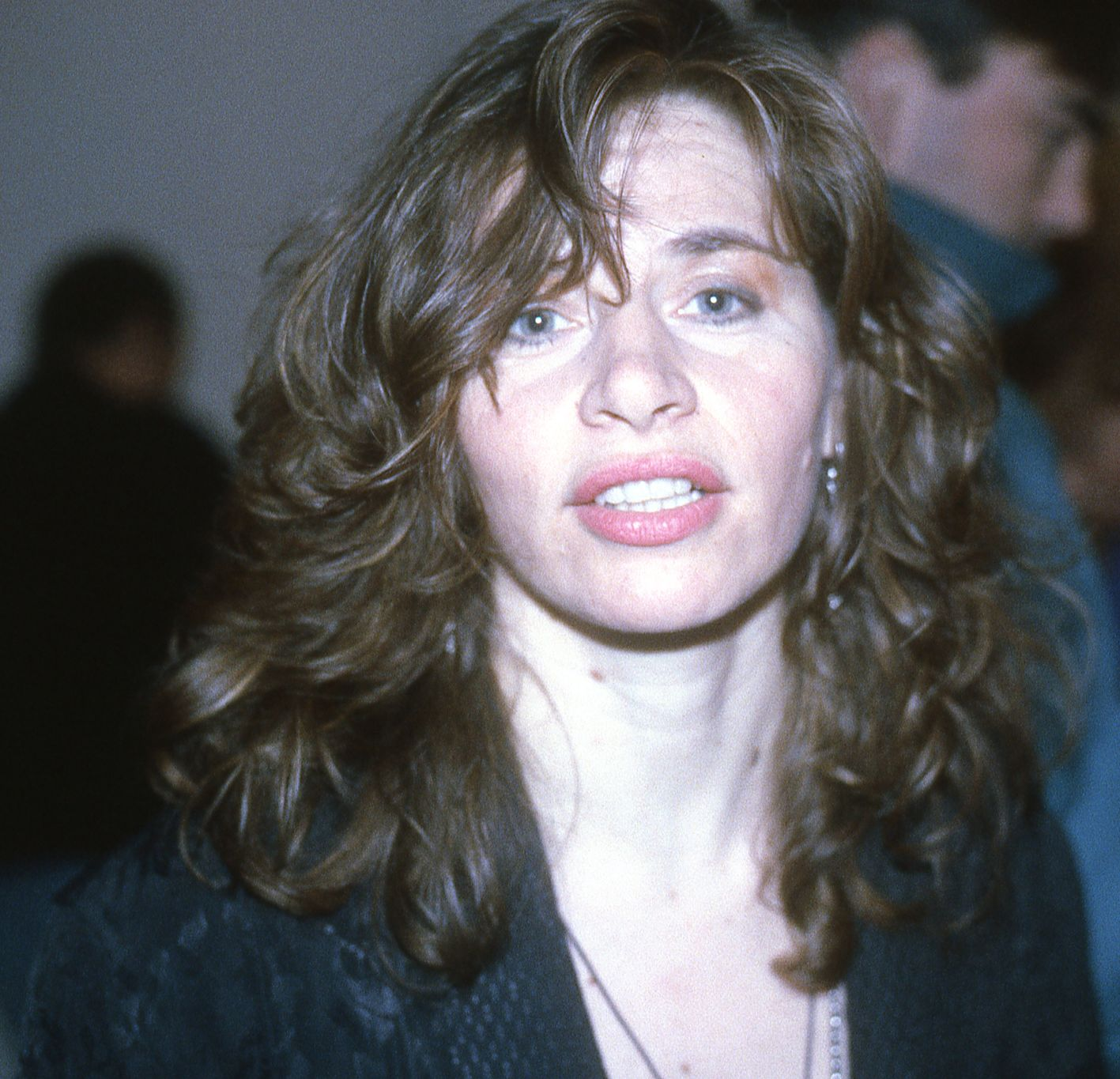
- Segato at a fundraiser in Toronto, 1993.

Background information
- Born: June 17, 1956 (age 70); Hamilton, Ontario, Canada
- Genres: New wave, pop rock
- Occupations: Songwriter, vocalist
- Years active: 1970s–1990s, 2005–2008, 2011–2014
- Formerly of: The Parachute Club

Lorraine P. Segato CM (born June 17, 1956, in Hamilton, Ontario) is a Canadian pop singer-songwriter, best known as the lead vocalist for and a principal songwriter of new wave and pop rock group The Parachute Club, with which she continues to perform.

== History ==
Segato initially became known in the late 1970s as the vocalist in the Toronto rock band Mama Quilla II. This band formed the core membership of The Parachute Club. The Parachute Club was particularly active in the 1980s, initially breaking up in 1989. Segato co-wrote nearly every song the band released, including all their singles. A reconstituted version of the band, including Segato, commenced performing in 2005 and continued to perform somewhat sporadically through 2014. After the initial break-up of Parachute Club, Segato released a solo album, Phoenix, in 1990.

In 1990, she collaborated on the one-off single "Can't Repress the Cause", a plea for greater inclusion of hip hop music in the Canadian music scene, with Dance Appeal, a supergroup of Toronto-area musicians that included Devon, Maestro Fresh Wes, Dream Warriors, B-Kool, Michie Mee, Lillian Allen, Eria Fachin, HDV, Dionne, Thando Hyman, Carla Marshall, Messenjah, Jillian Mendez, Lorraine Scott, Self Defense, Leroy Sibbles, Zama, and Thyron Lee White.

Her second solo album, Luminous City, followed in 1998.

She has also worked in film production, writing and directing a documentary on Toronto's late 1970s/early 1980s Queen Street West scene, Queen Street West, The Rebel Zone, and appearing in the documentary film The Pinco Triangle, and as a lecturer and social justice activist. Segato also appeared on the science fiction show Lexx, singing a song as the "Time Prophet" on the episode "Brigadoom".

She performed "Rise Up" at the state funeral of Jack Layton on August 27, 2011, supported by the choir of the Metropolitan Community Church of Toronto. In 2014, the surviving band members released a contemporary dance remix of the song in conjunction with Toronto's hosting of the 2014 edition of WorldPride.

Her third solo album, Invincible Decency, was released in 2015. She is also preparing Get Off My Dress, a loosely autobiographical one-woman theatrical play.

Segato was one of the people named to the Order of Canada on December 29, 2022, citing "her contributions to the Canadian music scene and culture as a pioneer in 2SLGBTQI+ Canadian history."

== Personal life ==
Segato is out as lesbian. She was previously married to Ilana Landsberg-Lewis, the daughter of Stephen Lewis and Michele Landsberg.

== Discography ==
=== Singles (Parachute Club) ===
Release date	Title	Chart peak	Album
Release date	Title	Canada RPM	Album
July 1983	"Rise Up"	9	The Parachute Club
1983	"Alienation"		The Parachute Club
1984	"Boy's Club"		The Parachute Club
October 1984	"At the Feet of the Moon"	11	At the Feet of the Moon
February 1985	"Act of an Innocent"	61	At the Feet of the Moon
June 1985	"Sexual Intelligence"		At the Feet of the Moon
October 1986	"Love Is Fire"	24	Small Victories
February 1987	"Love and Compassion"	81	Small Victories
May 1987	"Walk to the Rhythm"	90	Small Victories
January 1988	"Big Big World"	86	Non-album single
June 2014	"Rise Up (WorldPride Remix)"	—	Non-album single

=== Albums ===
==== With Mama Quilla II ====
- 1982 – KKK//Mama Quilla/Angry Young Woman Tupperwaros; EP.

==== With The Parachute Club ====
- 1983 – The Parachute Club Current/RCA
- 1984 – At the Feet of the Moon Current/RCA
- 1985 – Moving Thru the Moonlight Current/RCA; remixes
- 1986 – Small Victories (1986) Current/RCA
- 1992 – Wild Zone: The Essential Parachute Club BMG; reissued 2006 by EMI International

==== Solo ====
- 1990 – Phoenix Warner Bros. Records
- 1998 – Luminous City True North
- 2015 – Invincible Decency
