= The Legacy Continues... (Dream Warriors album) =

Studio album by Dream Warriors
- Released: July 9, 2002 (Canada)
- Recorded: 1998–2002
- Genre: Canadian hip hop, jazz rap
- Label: ISBA/BMG Canada
- Producer: Dream Warriors, Wriggz, Pierre J, The Herbaliser

Dream Warriors chronology
Anthology: A Decade of Hits 1988–1998 (1999)	The Legacy Continues... (2002)

Singles from The Legacy Continues...
- 1. "Road of Many Signs" Released: 1999; 2. "Breathe or Die" Released: 2000; 3. "Unstoppable" Released: 2002

Professional ratings
Review scores
Source	Rating
NOW	3/5 stars

The Legacy Continues... is the fourth and final studio album by Canadian hip hop duo Dream Warriors, released July 9, 2002 on ISBA/BMG Music, exclusively in Canada. It spawned the singles "Road of Many Signs", "Breathe or Die", and "Unstoppable". NOW magazine gave the album a 3 out of 5 rating, calling it "another set of jazzy, loose-limbed hiphop that skips from beats and rhymes to UK garage, Swizz Beatz-style bumps and dancehall." The album also included a remix of the group's best-known single from 1991, "My Definition of a Boombastic Jazz Style".

== Track listing ==
#	Title	Producer(s)	Length
1.	"Dream Dream Warriors"	Wriggz	4:09
2.	"Unstoppable"	Wriggz	3:46
3.	"Vacation"	Wriggz	3:52
4.	"Who Said I Can't Keep Up (Part 1)"	Wriggz	1:22
5.	"dreamwarriors.com"	Dream Warriors	2:56
6.	"Mistaken Earth 4 Heaven"	Wriggz	3:56
7.	"Armed Conflict"	Wriggz	3:43
8.	"Aqua Boogie (Beat-Lude)"	Wriggz	1:11
9.	"Dream War Thang"	Wriggz	4:42
10.	"Warrior's Drum"	Wriggz	6:14
11.	"It's Comical"	Wriggz	4:15
12.	"Love Boogie (Beat-Lude)"	Wriggz	1:03
13.	"God's Holodeck"	Wriggz	3:35
14.	"Breathe or Die"	Dream Warriors	3:21
15.	"Who Said I Can't Keep Up (Part 2)"	Wriggz	2:21
16.	"My Definition of a Boombastic Jazz Style (Pierre J Mix)"	Pierre J	4:01
17.	"Live from Collins Bay"	Wriggz	3:55
18.	"Road of Many Signs"	The Herbaliser	4:51
19.	"From Wriggz to Mom with Love"	Wriggz	0:44
20.	"Heavy Is My Aura"	Dream Warriors	2:52
