= Kollage (band) =

- Origin: Kolkata, West Bengal, India
- Genres: Rock, Pop, Jazz
- Years active: 2006–present
- Members: Biswabijoy Sen; Shonit Bagchi
- Past members: Jishnu Dasgupta; Koushik Chakraborty; Anirban Gomes; Parantap Basu; Amritava Biswas; Shuddha Satya Dey Mallick; Saikat Chatterjee; Prosenjit Bhattacharyya

Kollage is a Hindi Rock/Pop Band from Kolkata, India, which has performed all over India and has helped popularize different genres of music likes soul, blues, jazz in Hindi music through their original work. They are most popular for their live acts in the corporate and club circuit and have created a niche for themselves as the "Rockers from the IT industry". They have the distinction of being a very rare instance (probably the first) of a Hindi band from the Software Industry (TCS) in India to have cut an original album.

== History ==
Kollage is a Hindi Rock/Pop/Blues band formed by musicians who are also associates of TATA Consultancy Services (TCS), Kolkata. The band started back in 2003 and was brought together by Biswabijoy Sen and Koushik Chakraborty. Jishnu Dasgupta, Anirban Gomes and Prosenjit Bhattacharyya completed the initial line-up of the band. Back then, Kollage mostly played covers, mostly in the Indipop genre. Their IT background was a novelty and during 2003, they played quite a few gigs in Kolkata.

== The Second Coming ==
Back from an overseas assignment in early 2005, Biswabijoy Sen along with a new group of musicians - all of them once again from TCS - regrouped and "Kollage" was back; albeit as Rock/Blues inspired outfit. The new lineup included Shonit Bagchi, Parantap Basu, Amritava Biswas, Shuddha Satya Dey Mallick and Saikat Chatterjee. The big break came when they participated and won the TCS organized band contest named "RockMetazz" in Mumbai. "June", their first album, produced by TCS Maitree was released on 16 October 2006.

== Present ==
Biswabijoy (Singer/Songwriter/Rhythm Guitars) and Shonit (Bass Guitar) continue to perform the originals as well as covers in both Hindi and Bengali with various artistes.

== Discography ==
- June (Released October, 2006)
