= The Master Plan (album) =

Studio album by Dream Warriors
- Released: October 25, 1996
- Recorded: 1995–1996
- Genre: Canadian hip hop, jazz rap
- Length: 58:10
- Label: EMI
- Producer: DJ Luv, David Williams, Fatta Marshall

Dream Warriors chronology
Subliminal Simulation (1994)	The Master Plan (1996)	Anthology: A Decade of Hits 1988–1998 (1999)

Singles from The Master Plan
- 1. "Float On" Released: 1996; 2. "What Do You Want "Ladies"" Released: 1996; 3. "Sound Clash" Released: 1996

Professional ratings
Review scores
Source	Rating
AllMusic	2/5 stars
Muzik	5/10

The Master Plan is the third studio album by Canadian hip hop group Dream Warriors, released on October 25, 1996, on EMI Records in the United Kingdom and Canada. It spawned the singles "Float On", "What Do You Want "Ladies"", and "Sound Clash".

Compared to their previous albums, The Master Plan is more Caribbean-influenced, featuring collaborations with artists such as Beenie Man and General Degree. It was nominated for Best Rap Recording at the 1997 Juno Awards. Later that year, Spek and DJ Luv left the group.

== Track listing ==
#	Title	Producer(s)	Featured guest(s)	Length
1.	"Fear None (Interlude)"	DJ Luv		3:56
3.	"Here Today Gone Tomorrow"	DJ Luv		3:46
4.	"Sound Clash"	David Williams and DJ Luv	Beenie Man	4:22
5.	"The Master Plan"	DJ Luv	Kandu	3:38
6.	"Float On"	DJ Luv	Kuya	4:30
7.	"What Do You Want "Ladies""	DJ Luv	Saskia	4:27
8.	"From the Beginning"	DJ Luv		2:38
9.	"Test of Purity"	DJ Luv		3:58
10.	"Luvz History Lesson (Interlude)"	David Williams and DJ Luv		2:15
11.	"Dem No Ready"	DJ Luv	General Degree	3:59
12.	"Who's the Crook"	DJ Luv		3:44
13.	"First Ya Live"	DJ Luv	Riddler	3:50
14.	"Times Are Changing"	DJ Luv	Wriggz	4:37
15.	"Sound Clash (FattaSly Extended Mix)"	Fatta Marshall	Beenie Man	6:54
