= Yamaha MT-100 =

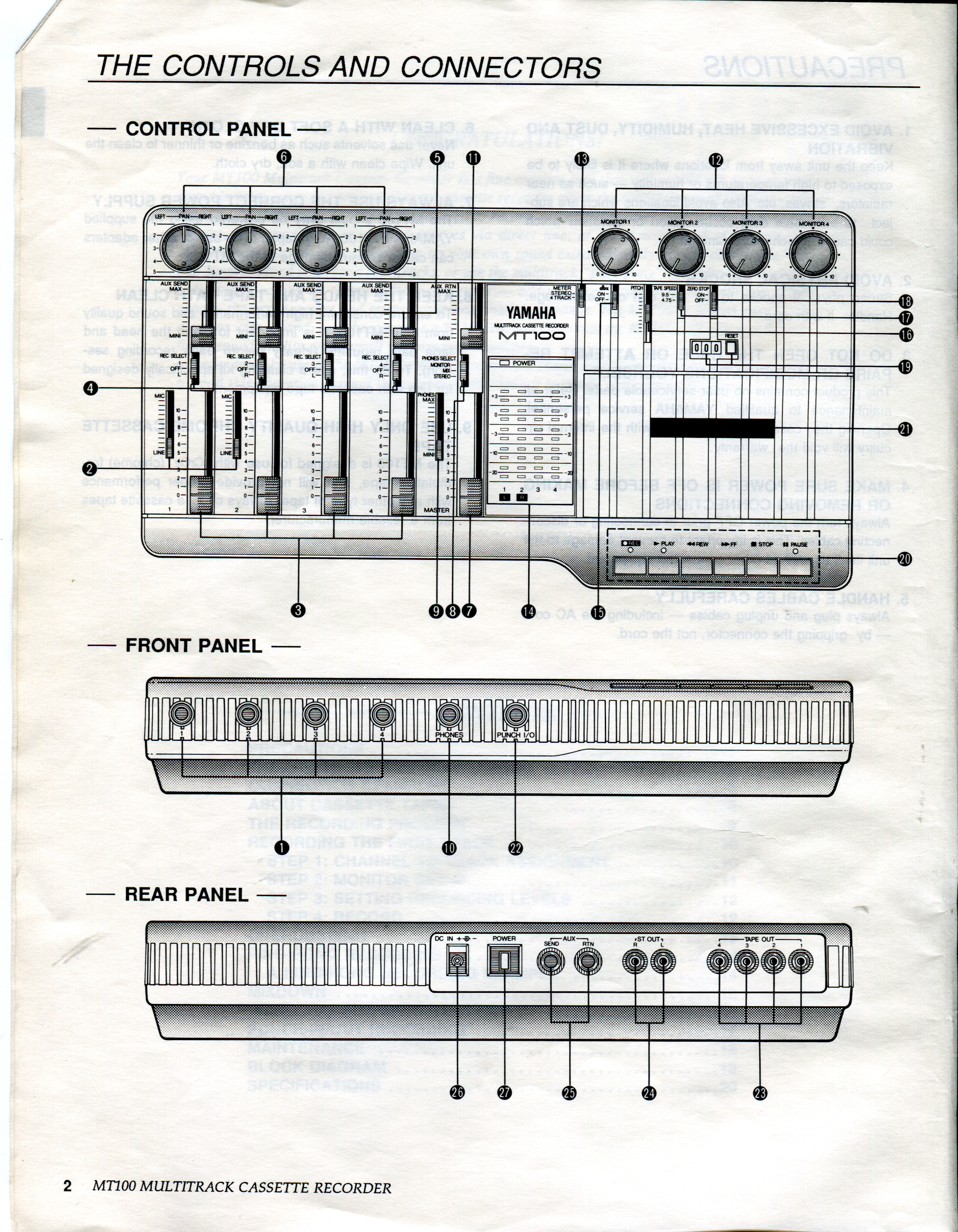
YAMAHA MT-100 basic controls and layout scanned from operation manual

The Yamaha MT-100 Multi-track Cassette Recorder is an analog tape deck developed to record artists in the late 1980s. It was marketed just before the advent of Digital Audio Tape. It allowed the variable speed recording of four tracks of audio that could be mixed, merged and re-recorded onto standard cassette tapes.

In proper condition, the Yamaha MT-100 was useful for capturing multi-part ideas quickly and simply. This has been used by people who primarily utilized samplers and synthesizers that have a multi-track music sequencer built in. This would allow someone to effectively number around 128 tracks.

It also has direct line recording from sequencers, allowed for clean recordings within a usable dynamic audio range.
