= Anthology: A Decade of Hits 1988–1998 =

Greatest hits album by Dream Warriors
- Released: June 22, 1999
- Recorded: 1990–1998
- Genre: Canadian hip hop, jazz rap
- Label: Priority Records
- Producer: Dream Warriors, Double Trouble, Gang Starr, Da Grassroots Music, DJ Premier, DJ Luv, Young Disciples

Dream Warriors chronology
The Master Plan (1996)	Anthology: A Decade of Hits 1988–1998 (1999)	The Legacy Continues... (2002)

Professional ratings
Review scores
Source	Rating
AllMusic	4.5/5 stars
The Village Voice	A−

Anthology: A Decade of Hits 1988–1998 is a greatest hits compilation album by Canadian hip hop group Dream Warriors, released June 22, 1999. It was released on Priority Records in the United States. The album featured two new songs, "U Ready" and "dreamwarriors.com". AllMusic gave it 4½ out of 5 stars, calling it "a great look at one of the better hip-hop groups of the '90s."

== Track listing ==
#	Title	Producer(s)	Featured guest(s)	Length
1.	"My Definition of a Boombastic Jazz Style"	Dream Warriors		4:26
2.	"Wash Your Face in My Sink"	Dream Warriors		3:41
3.	"Ludi (Double Trouble Club Mix)"	Double Trouble, Dream Warriors		5:08
4.	"I've Lost My Ignorance (Gangstarr Remix)"	Dream Warriors, Gang Starr	Guru	3:38
5.	"Day in Day Out"	Dream Warriors		3:58
6.	"Tricycles and Kittens"	Dream Warriors	Butterfly	4:30
7.	"California Dreamin'"	Dream Warriors		5:06
8.	"No Dingbats Allowed"	Da Grassroots, Dream Warriors		4:15
9.	"It's a Project Thing"	DJ Premier		4:41
10.	"Test of Purity"	DJ Luv		3:58
11.	"Sound Clash"	DJ Luv	Beenie Man	4:22
12.	"Dem No Ready"	DJ Luv	General Degree	3:58
13.	"Float On"	DJ Luv	Kuya	4:27
14.	"What Do You Want Ladies (80s Mix)"	DJ Luv	Saskia	5:32
15.	"U Ready"	Dream Warriors		4:04
16.	"dreamwarriors.com"	Dream Warriors		2:59
17.	"My Definition of a Boombastic Jazz Style (The Next Definition Mix)"	Dream Warriors, Young Disciples		4:36
