= Messenjah =

Canadian reggae group

Messenjah is a Canadian-based reggae group that flourished to become one of the most successful and popular reggae groups in the history of Canadian music.

== History ==
Messenjah was formed in 1980 in Kitchener, Ontario, and released their first album Rock You High independently in 1982. They were the first Canadian reggae band to be picked up by a major label; Warner Music Canada (also known as WEA). After 1985, the band began working out of Toronto. In 1988, the band was featured in the U.S. feature film Cocktail as well as on the film's soundtrack. They were also featured on the soundtrack of the Canadian produced movie Milk and Honey (1988). Messenjah had toured all over North America as well as in Jamaica for over sixteen years and in 1989 won the Juno Award for Best Reggae Recording.

In 1990, they collaborated on the one-off single "Can't Repress the Cause", a plea for greater inclusion of hip hop music in the Canadian music scene, with Dance Appeal, a supergroup of Toronto-area musicians that included Devon, Maestro Fresh Wes, Dream Warriors, B-Kool, Lillian Allen, Michie Mee, Eria Fachin, HDV, Dionne, Thando Hyman, Carla Marshall, Jillian Mendez, Lorraine Scott, Lorraine Segato, Self Defense, Leroy Sibbles, Zama, and Thyron Lee White.

Messenjah has not released an album since the late 1990s, and it is assumed the group disbanded around that time.

The band was originally started by Errol Blackwood (vocals, bass guitar), who left after 1986 to start a solo career, and Rupert "Ojiji" Harvey (vocals, guitar, saxophone). After Errol Blackwood's departure Harvey became the head of the group. Other original band members include Eric Walsh (guitar), Raymond Ruddock (drums), Hal Duggan (keyboard), and Tony King (percussion). Four new members joined in 1987; Roy Garrick (drums), Crash Morgan (drums), Charles Sinclair (bass guitar), and Haile Yeates (percussion). Finally, in 1990, Donovan Black (drums) replaced drummer Crash Morgan.

In February 2014, the band reunited for a Bob Marley tribute concert in Toronto. The band now consists of Rupert Harvey (lead vocals, guitar and founding member), Haile Yates (percussion), Robert Stephenson (drums), Carl Harvey (lead guitar), Charles Sinclair (bass), and Orville Malcomb (keyboards).

== Career highlights ==
Notable appearances and performances of Messenjah include the Reggae Sun Splash (Montego Bay, Jamaica), World Youth festival (Kingston, Jamaica), World Music Gallery Tour, The Bob Marley Memorial (Long Beach, California), Lahaina Civic (Maui, Hawaii), Vermont Reggae Music Festival, The Canadian National Exhibition, Ontario Place Forum, Maple Leaf Gardens, The Omni Theatre (Oakland, California), Havana Cuba, and The Starlight Bowl Amphitheatre. Messenjah also appeared on stage with Nelson Mandela at the Toronto SkyDome in 1998.

== Airplay ==
Messenjah's song "Jam Session" was used for many years as the intro for KCMU (now KEXP-FM)'s long running reggae show Positive Vibrations.

== Discography ==
Albums

- 1982: Rock You High (1983 re-release through WEA)
- 1984: Jam Session (WEA 25–04551)
- 1987: Cool Operator (Version VLP-001)
- 1990: Rock & Sway (Kick Up KUCD-001)
- 1990: Cool But Deadly (Trend)
- 1997: Catch De Vibe
- 1998: Catch De Vibe DJ BOOM PAC (Earth One 1998)

Popular singles

- "Arrested"
- "Rock You High"
- "Jam Session"
- "Cool Operator"
- "Could It Be I'm Falling In Love?"
- "Crazy"

Soundtrack appearances

- 1988: Cocktail
- 1989: Milk and Honey
- 1990: What's the Matter with Us? - Starring Raffi
- 2017: /hai taim/ by Urban Robot
