= Ojiji =

- Born: Rupert Harvey; 9 February 1955 (age 71); Clarendon Parish, Jamaica
- Genres: Reggae, jazz, funk, dance hall, traditional music
- Occupation: Musician
- Instrument: Vocals

Rupert "Ojiji" Harvey (born Clarendon Parish, Jamaica, 9 February 1955) is a reggae, jazz, funk, dancehall, and roots music musician who is known for his solo records as well as his work in the Canadian band Messenjah, which had a platinum record with the hit "Cool Operator".

== Early life ==
Born in Jamaica, Harvey moved to Canada with his family when he was eleven. In his teens, he helped form the R&B/funk band Crack of Dawn, which became the first Black Canadian band to be signed to a major label, Columbia Records, and is popular with collectors of funk vinyl. In the late 1970s, he embarked upon a solo career which resulted in two records, which are also sought after by D.J.s. Following his solo work, Rupert founded (with Errol Blackwood) and lead the reggae band, Messenjah, which was signed by Warner Bros. Records and went on to win many awards, including the Juno Award in 1998.

== Later career ==
Harvey has several film and television credits (Messenjah appeared in the movie Cocktail), and is the head of the Tai Mantis Kung Fu Association in Toronto, Ontario, Canada. He is so well-renowned for his work in the martial arts that he was elected International President of the official Praying Mantis Kung Fu school from China, plus four related Qigong medicine schools. In the 400-year history of the Praying Mantis Kung Fu school, this was the first time a non-Chinese has been elected to the position.

He also briefly played in a group called "The Redeem Team", backing Frankie Paul and Tiger.

== Notable performances ==
- For Nelson Mandela at Skydome, Toronto (1998)
- Reggae Sunsplash – with Messenjah (1985)
- Opening act for The Clash on their 'Combat Rock' Tour.

== Discography ==
=== Solo releases ===
- The Shadow: Ojiji (Ultra Records, 1979)
- Halfway Home: Ojiji
- Once a Lion: Rupert "Ojiji" Harvey (2000)

=== With Messenjah ===
- Rock You High (1982)
- Jam Session (1984)
- Cool Operator (1987)
- Rock & Sway (1990)
- Cool But Deadly (1990)
