= Dream Warriors (band) =

Canadian hip hop band

- Origin: Toronto, Ontario, Canada
- Genres: Canadian hip hop, Hip Hop, alternative hip hop, jazz rap
- Years active: 1988–2002
- Labels: Beat Factory Productions, 4th & Broadway, Island, Pendulum, EMI
- Members: King Lou; Capital Q
- Past members: DJ Luv; Spek

Dream Warriors were a Canadian hip-hop group recognized as a pioneering musical force of the jazz rap movement and the hip-hop scene in both Canada and the UK. The group is composed of original founding members Louis "King Lou" Robinson and Frank "Capital Q" Allert, the dynamic duo is described as "a pair of deft, intelligent rappers" by John Bush of AllMusic. Their 1991 debut album, And Now the Legacy Begins, was cited by Bush as one of the finest alternative hip hop records of the golden era. Before the release of their second album Subliminal Simulation in 1994, the duo became a group with the addition of rapper Spek and DJ Luv. In 1996, they released a third album, The Master Plan, before the two new members left the group a year later. Though their subsequent releases did not garner similar commercial success as their debut, the duo released a well-received greatest hits album in 1999. Their final album, The Legacy Continues..., was released in 2002.

== History ==
King Lou (Louis Robinson) and Capital Q (Frank Allert) formed Dream Warriors in 1988, hailing from the Jane and Finch and Willowdale neighbourhoods of Toronto. The same year, King Lou made his recording debut, appearing on Michie Mee and L.A. Luv's single "Victory Is Calling", which also featured MC Lyte. The duo began working on music together in 1989 and joined the Beat Factory Productions team. In 1990 they collaborated on the one-off single "Can't Repress the Cause", a plea for greater inclusion of hip hop music in the Canadian music scene, with Dance Appeal, a supergroup of Toronto-area musicians that included Devon, Maestro Fresh Wes, B-Kool, Michie Mee, Lillian Allen, Eria Fachin, HDV, Dionne, Thando Hyman, Carla Marshall, Messenjah, Jillian Mendez, Lorraine Scott, Lorraine Segato, Self Defense, Leroy Sibbles, Zama and Thyron Lee White.

They signed to 4th & B'way/Island Records and released their jazz-influenced debut album And Now the Legacy Begins in 1991. The album was critically acclaimed and sold well in Canada, the United Kingdom, and across Europe — before becoming an underground hit in the United States.

The album spawned the hit singles "Wash Your Face in My Sink", "My Definition of a Boombastic Jazz Style", and "Ludi". The first two singles hit the Top 20 in the UK, while in their own country, the album went gold and collected a Juno Award. The song "My Definition of a Boombastic Jazz Style" featured a sample of "Soul Bossa Nova" by Quincy Jones, which was the theme song for the Canadian game show Definition.

In 1992, they recorded "Man Smart, Woman Smarter" for the Buffy the Vampire Slayer soundtrack.

For their 1994 follow-up, Subliminal Simulation, Dream Warriors added rapper Spek (Hussain Yoosuf) and DJ Luv (formerly L.A. Luv; Phillip Gayle), turning the duo into a four-man group. The album received mixed reviews. It featured an appearance by Butterfly of Digable Planets and Gang Starr (Guru and DJ Premier) contributed to two tracks. Early production by Da Grassroots is found on the track "No Dingbats Allowed". Spoken word is also performed during the interludes. Two singles, "Day in Day Out" and "California Dreamin'", were released.

Dream Warriors released their third album The Master Plan in 1996, however, it was not released in the US. Three singles — "Float On", "What Do You Want 'Ladies'?", and "Sound Clash" (featuring Beenie Man) — supported the album. Later that year, they recorded a hip-hop version of the song "Edmonton Block Heater", which appeared on the compilation album A Tribute to Hard Core Logo. Spek left the group in 1997, before relocating to the UK. DJ Luv also left the group the same year. In 1999, Anthology: A Decade of Hits 1988–1998, a greatest hits compilation, was released on Priority Records. It featured two new tracks by the original duo. The compilation was critically acclaimed, with Robert Christgau stating: "Certainly they belong in the same sentence as De La Soul and A Tribe Called Quest." That year, the band performed in Hamilton as part of Showcase '99.

In 2002, they released their final album, The Legacy Continues..., exclusively in Canada. The Herbaliser produced the single "Road of Many Signs", which also appeared on their Very Mercenary album in 1999. Other singles included "Breathe or Die" and "Unstoppable".

In 2017, Icon, Dream Warriors' second compilation album, was released.

== Discography ==
Studio albums

- And Now the Legacy Begins (1991) – CAN No. 34, UK No. 18, AUS No. 53
- Subliminal Simulation (1994)
- The Master Plan (1996)
- The Legacy Continues... (2002)

Compilations

- Anthology: A Decade of Hits 1988–1998 (1999)
- Icon (2017)

Singles

Year	Title	Chart positions										Album
Year	Title	CAN	AUS	US Mod Rock	NZ	NED	GER	SWI	SWE	IRE	UK	Album
1990	"Wash Your Face in My Sink"	—	57	—	—	38	—	—	—	—	16	And Now the Legacy Begins
1990	"My Definition of a Boombastic Jazz Style"	—	65	24	—	59	22	15	15	—	13	And Now the Legacy Begins
1991	"Ludi"	56	117	—	—	48	—	—	—	24	39	And Now the Legacy Begins
1991	"Follow Me Not"	—	—	—	—	—	—	—	—	—	—	And Now the Legacy Begins
1994	"Day in Day Out"	—	—	—	—	—	—	—	—	—	99	Subliminal Simulation
1995	"California Dreamin'"	—	—	—	—	—	—	—	—	—	—	Subliminal Simulation
1996	"Float On"	—	—	—	30	—	—	—	—	—	—	The Master Plan
1996	"What Do You Want 'Ladies'?"	—	—	—	—	—	—	—	—	—	98	The Master Plan
1996	"Sound Clash"	—	—	—	—	—	—	—	—	—	—	The Master Plan
1999	"Road of Many Signs"	—	—	—	—	—	—	—	—	—	—	The Legacy Continues...
2000	"Breathe or Die"	—	—	—	—	—	—	—	—	—	—	The Legacy Continues...
2002	"Unstoppable"	—	—	—	—	—	—	—	—	—	—	The Legacy Continues...
"—" denotes releases that did not chart or were not released.

== Awards and nominations ==
- 1991 Juno Awards
  - Rap Recording of the Year for "Wash Your Face in My Sink" (Nominated)
- 1992 Juno Awards
  - Rap Recording of the Year for "My Definition of a Boombastic Jazz Style" (Won)
- 1995 Juno Awards
  - Best Rap Recording for Subliminal Simulation (Nominated)
- 1997 Juno Awards
  - Best Rap Recording for The Master Plan (Nominated)

== See also ==
- Canadian hip hop
- Music of Canada
