= And Now the Legacy Begins =

Studio album by Dream Warriors
- Released: April 23, 1991 (U.S.)
- Recorded: 1990–1991
- Genres: Canadian hip hop, jazz rap
- Length: 54:15
- Labels: 4th & B'way/Island/PolyGram; 444 037
- Producers: Dream Warriors, Richard Rodwell (aka Maximum 60), Split Personality, Ron Nelson, Krush and Skad

Dream Warriors chronology
And Now the Legacy Begins (1991)	Subliminal Simulation (1994)

Singles from And Now the Legacy Begins
- 1. "Wash Your Face in My Sink" Released: 1990; 2. "My Definition of a Boombastic Jazz Style" Released: 1990; 3. "Ludi" Released: 1991; 4. "Follow Me Not" Released: 1991

And Now the Legacy Begins is the debut album by Canadian hip hop duo Dream Warriors. It was released on April 23, 1991, by 4th & B'way Records, with an international release through Island Records. And Now the Legacy Begins is regarded as one of the finest alternative hip hop records of the golden era (1985–1995).

== Singles ==
"My Definition of a Boombastic Jazz Style", the album's most successful single, sampled Quincy Jones' "Soul Bossa Nova" — which was known to Canadian audiences as the theme tune to the game show Definition at the time of its release. The song was a hit in both Canada and Europe, winning a Juno Award for Rap Recording of the Year in 1992. The single sold 300,000 copies worldwide. "Wash Your Face in My Sink" and "Ludi" were also notable singles.

== Reception ==
Professional ratings
Review scores
Source	Rating
AllMusic	4.5/5 stars
MusicHound R&B: The Essential Album Guide	3.5/5 stars
NME	10/10
RapReviews	7.5/10
The Virgin Encyclopedia Nineties Music	4/5 stars

Spin highly recommended the album, praising its "stunning, almost seamless sample-driven tracks." Robert Christgau of The Village Voice gave the album an honorable mention and quipped that it was "West Indian daisy age from boogie-down Toronto", choosing the tracks "Ludi" and "My Definition of a Boombastic Jazz Style" as highlights. The Edmonton Journal stated: "Drawing on their own roots and the music of Chinese, Spanish and Italian friends they grew up with, they've produced an original sound that capsulizes the ebb and flow of '90s dance music."

Ned Raggett of AllMusic noted that "the duo plays around with any number of inspired samples and grooves, from jazz to harder-edged beats, with style and skill."

It peaked at No. 18 on the UK Albums Chart and No. 34 in Canada, where it received gold certification. Over 800,000 copies were sold worldwide.

In 2013, the album made Ballast's list of the top 50 Canadian albums of all time. In 2018, the album won the Polaris Heritage Prize Jury Award in the 1986-1995 category.

== Track listing ==
No.	Title	Producer(s)	Length
1.	"Mr. Bubbunut Spills His Guts"	Dream Warriors	0:16
2.	"My Definition of a Boombastic Jazz Style"	Dream Warriors	4:17
3.	"Follow Me Not"	Split Personality	3:02
4.	"Ludi"	Dream Warriors	3:03
5.	"U Never Know a Good Thing Till You Lose It"	Dream Warriors	4:04
6.	"And Now the Legacy Begins"	Krush and Skad	3:08
7.	"Tune from the Missing Channel"	Dream Warriors	4:30
8.	"Wash Your Face in My Sink"	Dream Warriors	3:37
9.	"Voyage Through the Multiverse"	Ron Nelson	6:14
10.	"U Could Get Arrested" (feat. Split Personality)	Split Personality	3:19
11.	"Journey On"	Ron Nelson	4:38
12.	"Face in the Basin"	Dream Warriors	3:44
13.	"Do Not Feed the Alligators"	Split Personality	3:35
14.	"Twelve Sided Dice"	Dream Warriors	4:25
15.	"Maximum 60 Lost in a Dream"	Maximum 60	0:03
16.	"Answer for the Owl"	Dream Warriors	3:20
Total length:			54:15

== Samples ==
- "My Definition of a Boombastic Jazz Style" – Contains a sample of "Soul Bossa Nova" by Quincy Jones
- "Follow Me Not" - Contains a sample of "Pressure Gauge" by Brother Jack McDuff
- "Ludi" – Contains a sample of "My Conversation" by Slim Smith & the Uniques
- "U Never Know a Good Thing Till You Lose It" – Contains samples of "Sing a Happy Song" by War and "Wild and Loose" and "The Walk" by the Time
- "And Now the Legacy Begins" – Contains samples of "Shine Your Light" by the Graingers and "Genius of Love" by Tom Tom Club
- "Tune from the Missing Channel" – Contains samples of "Oh Honey" by Delegation, "Kissing My Love" by Bill Withers and "Say It Loud, I'm Black and I'm Proud" by James Brown
- "Wash Your Face in My Sink" – Contains a sample of "Hang On Sloopy" by Count Basie
- "Face in the Basin" – Contains samples of "Think (About It)" by Lyn Collins and "Funky Stuff" by Kool & the Gang
- "Twelve Sided Dice" – Contains samples of "Riding High" by Faze-O and "Here I Go Again" by Whitesnake
- "Answer for the Owl" – Contains a sample of "Just Kissed My Baby" by the Meters

== Chart positions ==
Chart (1991)	Peak position
Canadian RPM Albums Chart	34
Australian ARIA Charts	53
UK Albums Chart	18

== Accolades ==
Publication	Country	Accolade	Year	Rank
Eye Weekly	Canada	Canadian Critics Poll - Albums of the Year	1991	25
The Face	United Kingdom	Albums of the Year	1991	13
Melody Maker	United Kingdom	Albums of the Year	1991	26
Musik Express/Sounds	Germany	Albums of the Year	1991	20
NME	United Kingdom	Albums of the Year	1991	18
Q	United Kingdom	Albums of the Year	1991	*
Rock de Lux	Spain	Albums of the Year	1991	3
RoRoRo Rock-Lexicon	Germany	Most Recommended Albums	2003	*
Vox	United Kingdom	Albums of the Year	1991	*
Slaight Family Polaris Heritage Prize	Canada	Winner - Critic's Selection (1986-1995 era)	2018	*

(*) signifies unordered lists

== Personnel ==
Adapted credits from the liner notes of And Now the Legacy Begins.

- Peter Ashworth – Photography
- Dream Warriors – Producer, Mixing
- Krush – Producer
- Maximum 60 – Producer, Engineer, Mixing
- Ron Nelson – Producer, Engineer
- Split Personality – Producer, Mixing
- Swifty – Artwork
- Wrighty – Artwork
