= Beat Factory =

Historic Canadian music brand

- Founded: 1982
- Founder: Ivan Berry; Rupert Gayle
- Status: Defunct
- Genre: Hip hop, R&B, reggae
- Country of origin: Canada
- Location: Toronto, Ontario

Beat Factory is a historic Canadian music brand that operated during the 1980s and 1990s under the leadership of Ivan Berry. As a small talent management firm and functional music production house, the rap music outfit filled a notorious void in Canadian music due to the lane of representation it fostered in support of a generation of then-underdog hip hop artists including its debut line up of Krush And Skad, Dream Warriors, HDV and Michie Mee & L.A. Luv. Today, the Beat Factory brand remains a nationally-acclaimed founding force of rap music and hip hop culture in Canada.

Founded by a budding entertainment entrepreneurial 19-year-old Ivan Berry, alongside his songwriter partner Rupert Gayle, the Beat Factory brand was born in 1982. Young, fresh, innovative and revolutionary in its small but mighty Pickering production house of rap music, Beat Factory represented a historically Black Canadian roster of talent spanning two-generations of Canadian urban hip hop music in Canada—from Michie Mee to Keisha Chanté, and Dream Warriors to Kardinal Offishall.

The first of milestones for the brand, the release of the 1987 Break'n Out compilation, A Beat Factory Production featuring the production of Scott La Rock and KRS-One, Rumble & Strong, Street Beat and Michie Mee & L.A. Luv. The "Made In Canada" production featured the KRS-One "Elements of Style" opening rhyme, "Boogie Down Productions is proud to introduce Canada's greatest, musically-inclined, intellectual representative for the rap industry on a whole, a major breakthrough for female emcees everywhere ... her name, Michie Mee ... this is BDP reporting live from Canada.

In 1988, under Beat Factory management, Michie Mee became the first Canadian rapper signed to an American record label, First Priority Music, distributed by Atlantic Records. Then came the success of Dream Warriors, who sold 800,000 copies of their debut album And Now the Legacy Begins, released in 1991.

In 1996, Berry founded Beat Factory Music Inc., an independent record label branch of Beat Factory, distributed by EMI Music Canada and BMG Music Canada. The label released a series of compilation albums, known as RapEssentials and GroovEssentials. These albums included the first singles by Kardinal Offishall and Glenn Lewis, who both became prominent artists in the 2000s.

== See also ==
- List of record labels
