= Cameo Blues Band =

Canadian blues band

The Cameo Blues Band
- Origin: Toronto, Ontario
- Genres: Blues, rhythm and blues, soul
- Years active: 1978–1990; intermittently thereafter
- Spinoffs: Parachute Club; The Partland Brothers; Fathead
- Spinoff of: Brutus; Crowbar; Greaseball Boogie Band / Shooter; Cueball; Downchild Blues Band
- Members: Ray Harrison; John Bride; Michael Sloski; John Dickie; Travis Harrison; Tom Griffiths
- Past members: Richard "Hock" Walsh (deceased); Fraser Finlayson(deceased); Tony Flaim (deceased); Chuck Jackson; Malcolm Tomlinson; Walter Zwol; Omar Tunnoch; Billy Bryans (deceased); Paul Armstrong; Wayne Mills; Wally Cameron; Randall Coryell; Mike Eastman; Gerry Markman; Dave Gray; Fred Keeler; Tom Griffiths; Hendrik Rik; Fergus Marsh; Jerry Penfound; Larry Bodner; Perry White; Scott Cushnie; Joe Agnello

The Cameo Blues Band is a Toronto-based blues band, originally formed in 1978. It is particularly notable for its association with several of Canada's leading blues singers, including Richard "Hock" Walsh, Tony Flaim and Chuck Jackson, all of whom were also associated with the Downchild Blues Band.

== History ==
The band is named after the Cameo Lounge of Toronto's Hotel Isabella, as it then was, in the 1970s and 1980s. The Cameo Lounge featured primarily local blues artists and, as of 1978, had a regular house band, initially led by Richard "Hock" Walsh, during one of several periods when Walsh was either fired or quit as the lead singer of the Downchild Blues Band. Walsh was soon joined by former Crowbar keyboard player "Rabbit" Ray Harrison who, along with guitarist John Bride, became the core of the group during its over three decade history. Other initial band members included Billy Bryans, later of the Parachute Club, on drums, and Omar Tunnoch, later of the funk and blues band Fathead, on bass.

Hock Walsh soon left the band to return to Downchild, and was briefly replaced by Fraser Finlayson, of the band Cueball, prior to the band finding a replacement in Tony Flaim, whom Hock Walsh had replaced in Downchild. Billy Bryans was replaced on drums by Paul Armstrong, while Wayne Mills joined the band as a tenor saxophonist.

Harrison, Bride and Mills had previously played together in 1970, as founding members of the Greaseball Boogie Band, playing 1950s rock and roll. The Greaseball Boogie Band evolved into Shooter in 1975, which played 1940s swing and big band music. It was at the time of the breakup of Shooter, in the late 1970s, that Harrison, Bride and Mills came together as the Cameo Blues Band.

The band found a semi-permanent replacement vocalist in Chuck Jackson, who joined the band in 1979 and remained with them until 1981 at which point he formed Citizen's Arrest along with John Bride, Paul Nixon and Dennis Pinhorn. In 1982 Harrison resurrected the Cameos with a whole new lineup of players which included bassist Joe Agnello, drummer Sonnie Bernardi from Crowbar, guitarist Gerry Markman, saxophonist Wayne Mills and vocalist Malcolm Tomlinson. A recording session with this lineup took place at the Isabella but was never released. Chuck Jackson went on to become Downchild's lead vocalist in 1990. Other vocalists who appeared with the band included Walter Zwol, Malcolm Tomlinson and John Dickie.

Until the mid-1980s, the band was the house band at the Cameo Lounge, featuring notable guest artists on occasion. Some of the guest artists included Georgie Fame, Spencer Davis, Huey Lewis, Sting, Dan Aykroyd and Kelly Jay. After ceasing to be the house band at the Cameo Lounge, the band continued to play regularly around Toronto and area. In addition, various band members commenced side projects. For example, John Bride became a guitarist recording and backing on tour with The Partland Brothers, following their success with the song "Soul City" and the related album, Electric Honey.

In 2002, at the instigation of producer and independent label owner Lance Anderson, the Cameo Blues Band recorded its first album, on Make It Real Records. Band membership for the album was composed of Ray Harrison (piano and Hammond B3), John Bride (guitar), Tom Griffiths (bass) and Michael Sloski (drums). Vocals were contributed by four previous lead singers of the band: Dickie, Jackson, Tomlinson and Zwol. Invited guests contributing to the album were Michael Fonfara, keyboard player for Downchild, Freddie Keeler and Terry Blersh on guitars, and Larry Shields on tuba.

By the 2000s, most band members were involved in other projects, with the band itself playing a few times per year. In late 2009, the band specifically reunited for a 30th anniversary concert, at the Lighthouse Festival Theatre in Port Dover, Ontario. Appearing at the reunion concert were Ray Harrison, John Dickie, Freddie Keeler, Mike Sloski, John Bride, Wayne Mills and Travis Harrison, plus guests.

In 2012, the band released its second album, 10,000 Hours, also on Make It Real Records.

== Discography ==
- 2002 All Play and No Work (Make It Real Records)
- 2012 10,000 Hours (Make It Real Records)
