= John Witmer =

- John Witmer (second from right) with The BelAirs (later The Fabricators), circa 1990.

Background information
- Born: John Douglas Witmer; February 1951
- Died: July 3, 2004 (aged 53) Vancouver, British Columbia, Canada
- Genres: Blues
- Occupations: Singer, harmonica player, songwriter
- Instrument: Harmonica
- Years active: 1969 – 2002

John Douglas Witmer (February 1951 – July 3, 2004) was a Canadian blues singer, songwriter and harmonica player, most notable as the lead vocalist for the band Whiskey Howl and the Downchild Blues Band.

== Biography ==
Described as "one of Toronto's great blues singers from the late '60s to the mid-'80s", with "a raspy vocal style", John Witmer co-founded the seminal Canadian blues band, Whiskey Howl in 1969, when he was eighteen years old. The Toronto-based Whiskey Howl, along with the Downchild Blues Band, also formed in 1969, were two of the principal influences in the development of Canadian blues music.

One of Witmer's first professional engagements with Whiskey Howl was as one of the acts playing at the Toronto Rock and Roll Revival in September 1969. This was a one-day festival, featuring an historic appearance by John Lennon and The Plastic Ono Band, and which resulted in the release of the album Live Peace in Toronto 1969.

Despite the early success and promise of Whiskey Howl, the band broke up as of 1972, shortly after the release of their first album. Witmer continued to sing locally through the balance of the 1970s, rejoining Whiskey Howl for a reunion concert that resulted in the band's second album release, Live at The El Mocambo, in 1981.

Between 1982 and 1986, Witmer was the lead singer of the Downchild Blues Band, one of three singers who replaced Downchild co-founder Richard "Hock" Walsh, during various periods when Walsh either left the band or was fired as Downchild's lead singer. He recorded one album with Downchild, But I'm on the Guest List (1982), recorded live at Toronto's El Mocambo club, after Downchild had regrouped following the death of band member Jane Vasey.

Witmer relocated to Vancouver in the late 1980s, where he joined The BelAirs, a band that existed between 1985 and 1995, after which it became known as The Fabricators. The Fabricators were described by the West Coast Blues Review as "one of Vancouver's hottest R&B acts". The music with which Witmer was associated at the time was described as "the raw & powerful Delta and Chicago blues, rhythmic New Orleans and Tex-Mex tunes, old rock and roll gems, the smooth urban sounds of Detroit and Philadelphia, as well as many original compositions." During this same period and for the last fifteen years of his life, Witmer was an employee of the British Columbia Institute of Technology, where he worked with Larry Smith, co-founder of The BelAirs and The Fabricators. The Fabricators, established in 1995 as a successor band to The BelAirs, broke up in 2002, and was Witmer's last band. He ceased performing after the band's breakup. Witmer died suddenly two years later, on July 3, 2004, at the age of 53. He was survived by his second wife, a daughter and two sons.

It is with great sadness and heavy hearts that The Fabricators announce the passing of John Witmer (lead singer). He was truly one of Canada's best blues singer-songwriters. ...John's passing is a great loss to the Canadian music scene, and he will be sadly missed by all his fans, friends and family.

News Announcement, The Fabricators, July 12, 2004.

In the week following his death, a memorial service was held for John Witmer in Vancouver, attended by family, musical contemporaries and colleagues from the British Columbia Institute of Technology. In Toronto, on July 27, 2004, John Witmer was remembered by his Toronto family and colleagues in music through an additional memorial service.

== Discography ==
=== Whiskey Howl ===
- 1972 Whiskey Howl (Warner Bros. Records; CD Release 2008, Pacemaker)
- 1981 Live at The El Mocambo (As The Whiskey Howl Big Band; CD Release 2005, re-release 2009, Solid Gold)

=== Downchild Blues Band ===
- 1982 But I'm on the Guest List (Attic)

=== The BelAirs ===
- 2008 BelAirs Live 85–95 (Independent)

=== The Fabricators ===
- 2001 The Fabricators (Independent)

=== Contributions to others ===
- 2000 Michael Pickett, Conversation with the Blues

=== Compilations ===
- 1992 Canadian Blues Masters K-tel; cassette-only release.
- 2002 Vancouver BC's Best Blues, Vol. 1 (Raw Records)
