= Gerry Markman =

Canadian guitarist

- Born: 1950 (age 75–76); Montreal, Quebec, Canada
- Occupation: Guitarist

Gerry Markman (born 16 August 1950) is a Canadian guitarist. His particularly notable musical associations have been with the Cameo Blues Band, the Lincolns, Richard "Hock" Walsh and Alannah Myles.

== Biography ==
Markman began playing guitar at age 12, learning from his sister, Mirel. Over the next 15 years, Markman toured and recorded with the Max Band and Dandy Batt. His single, "The Flying Dutchman", became a cult favourite.

In 1977 he moved to Toronto to work at the second location of Steve's Music Store and left performing for a while. He was coaxed out of 'retirement' by Bob Segarini and left Steve's Music in 1981 to devote himself entirely to music, playing guitar for Marghie Evans and Pamela Cannon, and numerous jobbing gigs, TV shows and sessions. Markman joined the Cameo Blues Band with Malcolm Tomlinson in 1982 and later toured with the Lincolns, opening for Robert Palmer. Markman returned to Toronto and played with the Alannah Myles Band, Tom Barlow and the late Richard "Hock" Walsh. On special occasions, Markman has also performed with Dan Aykroyd and Jeff Healey. His recording credits include Rosenshontz (It's the Truth), Michael Vincent (Home in the Forest), Tapestry (I Need Your Lovin') and Ron Wiseman (Mystical Mood).

In 1991, Markman returned to Steve's Music and continued playing with the Gerry Markman Band, the French Connection and Curley Bridges. He led the Ruanne's House Band in Barrie, hosting dozens of Ontario's finest musicians as guests and twice was musical director for the Barrie Music Awards. He became the driving force of the rockin' blues band the Sensations, based out of Orillia, Ontario.

Markman still plays with the Sensations, Malcolm Tomlinson and occasionally the Partland Brothers. He still does sessions and also performs as a solo acoustic artist. Markman recently played with Jimmy Hall, former lead singer of Wet Willie.

Markman was profiled in the January 2008 issue of CMT (Canada Music Trades) magazine.

Markman is the uncle of the hurdy-gurdy artist Ben Grossman.

== See also ==
- Recordings featuring the hurdy-gurdy
