= Tony Flaim =

- Born: April 20, 1948
- Died: March 10, 2000 (aged 51)
- Genres: Blues
- Occupation: Singer
- Formerly of: Downchild Blues Band

Tony Flaim (April 20, 1948 – March 10, 2000) was among the early professional blues singers in Canada, most notable as the lead singer for the Downchild Blues Band on six of that band's albums. Flaim was associated with Downchild for extended periods over fifteen years.

== Biography ==
Tony Flaim first came to prominence as a blues singer when he succeeded Richard "Hock" Walsh as the lead singer the Downchild Blues Band in 1974. Hock Walsh had been fired by his brother and Downchild band co-founder Donnie, prior to work commencing on the band's third album, Dancin'. Hock rejoined the band in 1977, at which time Flaim joined the Cameo Blues Band, the legendary house band at the Cameo Lounge of Toronto's Hotel Isabella. Flaim succeeded Hock Walsh as the lead singer of the Cameo Blues Band, in the same manner as he had succeeded Hock Walsh as the lead singer of Downchild. When Hock Walsh quit Downchild in 1978, Flaim again was his replacement. In 1982, Flaim was replaced by John Witmer, best known to that point as the lead singer of seminal Canadian blues band Whiskey Howl, and who remained as Downchild's lead singer during the 1982–1986 period. Flaim then formed a new blues band, Tony Flaim and The Dukes, which was generally well received, becoming a house band at Toronto's venerable Jarvis House Tavern. He also was the original lead singer for Fathead, a multi award-winning, Toronto-based blues and rhythm and blues band. In 1986, Flaim succeeded Witmer in Downchild until 1989, when Hock Walsh rejoined and was fired from Downchild for a final time.

Flaim died of a heart attack, on March 10, 2000, at the age of 51, less than three months after Hock Walsh and barely a month after appearing at a tribute concert in memory of Hock Walsh. At the time of his death, he was scheduled to contribute vocals to a forthcoming album by Dave "Big Daddy G" Glover, with whom Hock Walsh had made his last recordings. One of the demo tracks Flaim completed with Glover was included on the Big Daddy G Topless album (2000), which also included the tribute song, "Blues for T.F."

One of my earliest memories of Tony Flaim is him phoning me at midnight and exhorting me to go down to Grossman's to see the Downchild Blues Band. This would have been about 1969. ...I was in a band with Tony, while we were still teenagers living in Downsview, and while I was discovering the blues Tony knew about and turned me on to: people like Bobby Blue Bland, T-Bone Walker... guys I had never heard of.

His encouragement and support for me personally is very close to my heart. He was so much larger than life . He loved these blues. Strike that – he loved music... from Bobby Bland to John Coltrane to Little Feat to Aretha Franklin.

The last time I saw Tony, he was singing at the memorial/wake for Hock Walsh. ...When Tony got up to play, I was drawn toward the stage where he was singing with a couple of horn players in the Kansas City tradition of Big Joe Turner. I turned to my friend and said, "this is as good as it gets".

...I will always remember him with joy and I will miss him for a very long time.

Michael Pickett, Remembering Tony Flaim, April 2000; www.torontobluessociety.com.

Flaim was remembered by way of a benefit memorial concert at Toronto's Horseshoe Tavern, on May 7, 2000. Playing in his honour were such acts as Downchild, Fathead, Big Daddy G, the Cameo Blues Band and The Dukes—the bands with which Tony Flaim had been associated during a career of over twenty-five years—plus Michael Pickett, who publicly acknowledged Flaim's encouragement of and influence on Pickett's own career. Proceeds from the concert were to provide educational support to Tony Flaim's son.

== Discography ==
=== Downchild ===
- 1974 Dancin' (Special)
- 1975 Ready To Go (Special)
- 1979 We Deliver (Attic)
- 1980 Road Fever (Attic)
- 1981 Blood Run Hot (with Spencer Davis) (Attic)
- 1987 It's Been So Long (Stony Plain/BMG)

=== Big Daddy G ===
- 2000 Topless
