= Yaremenko =

Yaremenko (Яременко) is a surname coming from given name Yarema. Notable people with this surname include:

- Illia Yaremenko (born 1997), Ukrainian Paralympic swimmer
- Yury Yaremenko (1935–1996), Soviet economist
