= Bootleg (Downchild Blues Band album) =

Studio album by Downchild Blues Band
- Released: 1971
- Recorded: Toronto, 1971
- Genre: Blues
- Length: 35:51
- Label: Special
- Producer: Bleakney-McConnell

Downchild Blues Band chronology
Bootleg (1971)	Straight Up (1973)

Bootleg is the debut album from the Canadian blues group the Downchild Blues Band released in 1971.

Having been rehearsing and playing live shows since 1969, the band proceeded to create one of Canada's earliest independent records. Recorded over two nights in 1971 in a makeshift studio at Toronto's Rochdale College, Donnie Walsh and others distributed the album by hand. It was also welcomed by major Toronto music retailer Sam Sniderman of Sam the Record Man renown, who was very much disposed to promoting Canadian music. The record was soon acquired by RCA Records Canada for more general distribution. It reached number 62 in Canada in May 1972.

== Track listing ==
1. "Rock It" – 3:57
2. "Just a Little Bit" – 3:02
3. "Down in Virginia" – 3:30
4. "That's All Right" – 4:50
5. "Messin' With The Kid" – 3:18
6. "Don't You Bother My Baby" – 4:01
7. "Change My Way of Livin'" – 5:04
8. "You Don't Have to Go" – 3:04
9. "Next Time You See Me" – 2:20
10. "I'm Sinkin'" – 2:45

== Personnel ==
- Don Walsh – guitar
- Rick (The Hock) Walsh – vocals
- Jim Milne – bass
- Cash Wall – drums
- Dave Woodward – tenor saxophone
- Ron Jacobs – tenor and baritone saxophones

== Production ==
- Executive producer: Bleakney-McConnell
- Direction: Dick Flohil
- Recording studio: Sound Horn (Toronto)
- Recording engineer: Bill Bryans
- Sound & Mix: Alan Duffy
- Art Direction: Bleakney - McConnell
- Cover photo: Larry Nicols
