= Michael Pickett =

Michael Pickett may refer to:

- Michael Pickett (musician)
- Michael Pickett (swimmer)
