= Zwoliński =

Zwoliński (feminine: Zwolińska, plural: Zwolińscy) is a Polish surname.

Notable people with the surname include:

- Klaudia Zwolińska (born 1998), Polish canoeist
- Krzysztof Zwoliński (born 1959), Polish athlete
- Łukasz Zwoliński (born 1993), Polish footballer
- Walter Zwolinski (born 1946), Canadian musician
