= Brutus (Canadian band) =

Canadian rock band

- Origin: Toronto, Ontario, Canada
- Genres: Rock
- Years active: 1969–1971; 1973–1978
- Label: Quality Records
- Members: Walter Zwolinski, Tom Wilson, Michael Magann, Lance Wright, Sonny Wingay, Bill Robb
- Past members: Bill Wade, Gino Scarpelli

Brutus was a Canadian rock band formed in 1969 and active, with interruptions, between 1969 and 1978.

== Background ==
The original band consisted of Walter Zwolinski (then billed as "Wally Soul") as vocalist, Tom Wilson as bassist, Michael Magann on trumpet, Lance Wright on drums, Eldon "Sonny" Wingay on guitar, and Bill Robb on sax and trombone. They were the openers for popular Canadian and American acts that were touring Canada, such as The Guess Who and for Chicago at the University of Waterloo.Their 1970 single "Funky Roller Skates" made it to #7 on RPM's list of Canadian Content songs receiving airplay, although the track did not cross over into the top 100. They were sometimes billed as Brutus and the Assassins (a nod to another Toronto group, Little Caesar and the Consuls).

== Career ==
Brutus was booked to appear at the "Freak Out" festival, which was a 72-hour event that ran on the Labor Day period from August 29 to September 1, held at Rock Hill, 16 miles north of Orangeville. Other acts booked to appear were The Brass Union, Rhinoceros, Lighthouse, Motherlode, The Guess Who, and Buckstone Hardware, among others.

Along with Rotary Connection, The Poor Souls and Chimo!, they were booked to appear at the Midsummer Night's Rock Fest which ran from June 26, 1970 – July 5, 1970 in Michigan.

Brutus disbanded in 1971, then reformed in 1973 with a revised line-up and new look. They decided to add a theatrical flair to their stage act, similar to the glam rock bands that were popular in Britain at the time. With a mixture of heavy makeup, wild costumes, and sexual innuendo, Brutus became popular live, but found few friends with the local authorities or concert organizers. Their live performances reached a pinnacle with a sold-out show at Toronto's Ontario Place, with The Stampeders, April Wine, and the Greaseball Boogie Band (later known as Shooter).

The new Brutus lineup recorded two singles on GRT Records in 1975, with Ooh, Mama Mama becoming their most remembered recording. Although it failed to chart in RPM, it was named top Canadian single in an end-of-year poll by the Montreal Star, and did well in local markets. Their debut album Brutus would follow in 1976, featuring the group's #65 chart hit Who Wants To Buy A Song, but only one further (non-charting) single would follow before they disbanded. Also just before disbanding, Brutus opened for Peter Gabriel at Maple Leaf Gardens.

Notable musicians associated with Brutus were Gino Scarpelli, later of Goddo, Paul Dean, later of Streetheart and Loverboy, Jerry Doucette, who has had a distinguished solo career, John Bride, later of the Cameo Blues Band, Frank Ludwig and Doni Underhill, later of Trooper, Dennis Pinhorn, later of the Downchild Blues Band, and Len Sembaluk, later of Alabama.

== Discography ==
=== Singles ===
- 1970 "Funky Roller Skates" / "Flyer" (Quality)
- 1970 "Duck Pond" (Quality)
- 1971 "Help Me, Free Me" (Yorkville)
- 1975 "(Let Me Down) Slow And Easy" / "Tonight, Tonight" (GRT)
- 1975 "Ooh Mama Mama" / "Ride Cowboy Ride" (GRT)
- 1976 "Who Wants To Buy A Song" (GRT) #65 Canada
- 1976 "Ooh Mama Mama" (Pye - UK)
- 1976 "Sailing" / "Search For Tomorrow" (GRT)

=== Albums ===
- 1976 Brutus (GRT)
- 2000 For The People: The Best of Brutus (Bullseye)

== Members ==
- Walter Zwolinski (lead vocals, organ, synths)
- Sandy White (bass)
- Eldon "Sonny" Wingay (guitar)
- Bill Robb (sax, trombone)
- Michael Magann (trumpet)
- Lance Wright (drums; 1969–1970; 1972–1973)
- Len Sembaluk (drums; 1971)
- Bruce Gordon (trumpet, organ, guitar, bass; replaced Magann)
- Danny Smith (drums; replaced Sembaluk 1973–1978)
- John Bride (guitar, banjo, ukulele)
- Frank Ludwig (keyboards; 1975)
- Dennis Pinhorn (bass; 1975)
- Doni Underhill (bass; replaced Pinhorn 1975–1976)
- Chris Brockway (bass; replaced Underhill 1976–1977)
- Woody West (guitars)
- Laurie Del Grande (piano, organ, synths)
- Dave Breckles (drums)
- Breen LeBoeuf (bass, vocals)
- Paul Dean (guitar)
- Bill Wade (drums)
- Gino Scarpelli (guitar)
- Jerry Doucette (guitar)
