= Bernie LaBarge =

Canadian musician (born 1953)

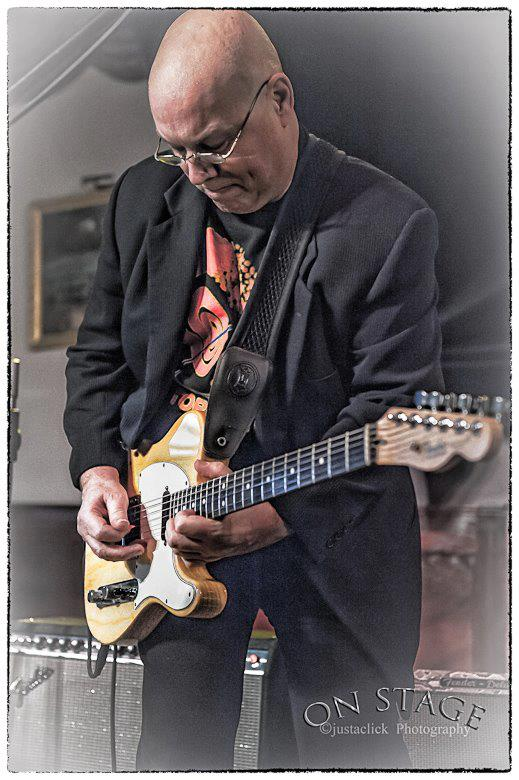
- Bernie LaBarge photo

Background information
- Born: March 11, 1953 (age 73); Ottawa, Ontario, Canada
- Occupations: Guitarist, singer, songwriter, session player, jingles and TV scoring
- Years active: 1967–2020
- Website: bernielabarge.com

Bernie LaBarge (born March 11, 1953) is a Canadian performing and session guitarist, singer and songwriter, and producer.

LaBarge has been the guitarist/front man for acts such as Rain, Sweet Blindness, Zwol, Stem, Stingaree, The Irish Rovers, Cassandra Vasik, The Dexters, and the George Olliver band. He has also recorded and toured with The Irish Rovers, Doug Riley, Ian Tyson, David Clayton-Thomas, Rhinoceros, Long John Baldry, Domenic Troiano, Ronnie Hawkins, John Kay, Kim Mitchell, John Sebastian, David Cassidy, and Rush's Alex Lifeson.

== Life and career ==
=== Early life ===
LaBarge was born in Ottawa, Ontario. His family then moved to Burlington, Ontario, and he grew up in a musically inclined house, listening to everything from show tunes to Motown. When the Beatles and the British Invasion came around, he'd hang around the record store, Music Village in Burlington, and learned the guitar from listening to records.

=== Career beginnings ===
LaBarge states: "The Mandala was the first live band I ever saw, and guitarist Domenic Troiano and the band changed my life." Inspired by The Rogues opening for the Rolling Stones in 1966 at Maple Leaf Gardens in Toronto, LaBarge dreamed of moving to Toronto.

=== 1970s ===
He began playing professionally in 1967, and then during the 1970s into the early 1980s, LaBarge toured with various bands as a guitarist/front man.

He recalls that as a kid, while he was learning to play guitar, he wanted to be a session musician. His father had an interest in tape recorders, so with the equipment in the family basement, LaBarge figured out how to tape songs off the radio, opening up another track and playing along with it: "I wanted to be that session guy playing that great cover, and embellishing the tune like George Harrison did to Beatles tunes. And I ultimately wanted to work with the professionals and get it on tape."

=== 1980s ===
By 1980, LaBarge was performing with Kearney, King, McBride and LaBarge at El Mocambo.

He stopped touring in 1981, watching how Steely Dan had chosen to retire from live performances to become a studio-only band. He wrote "Dream Away," produced by Lanois, and it was originally released as a single in 1981. Bernie continued to write for himself and others, landing a contract with Sony Records to record Barging In. The record earned him that Canadian Juno Award nomination in 1984 for Most Promising Male Vocalist.

In the late 1970s, he started doing jingles at Grant Avenue studio in Hamilton with Dan Lanois and his brother Bob. He sang and played on 200 jingles for local companies. He later went on to performing on hundreds of worldwide jingles (Coke, Pepsi, GM, Ford) and countless recording sessions with producer Jack Richardson. LaBarge also played for television series Smith & Smith (1979–1985), Party with The Rovers (1983–1986), Danger Bay (1985–1989) on CBC, and The Doodlebops. Recalling playing for Fraggle Rock (1983–1987).

=== 1990s to 2000s ===
In the 1990s, LaBarge performed with The Irish Rovers, Mind Over Matter, The Danny B Blues Band, Cassandra Vasik, and The Incontinentals. He also became the lead guitarist for The Dexters in 1994, and began playing at The Orbit Room, a local Toronto bar co-owned by Rush's Lifeson, who often jammed with the band. LaBarge played at The Orbit Room for more than 1000 appearances. In November 2014, The Dexters completed their twentieth anniversary at The Orbit Room with a farewell appearance.

In 2015, LaBarge suffered a fall and injury, requiring a surgery which kept him from practicing guitar.

== Influences ==
LaBarge described Jack Richardson as a "surrogate father" to him after they met.

Another major influence was guitarist Domenic Troiano, who inspired LaBarge in high school: "Donnie's band, The Mandala, was the first live band I saw at high school, and they changed my life. Around 1980, Donnie and I later became close friends, and I first got to hold his Tele shortly thereafter, due to a great deal of persistence on my part. Fast forward many years, coupled with the untimely passing of Donnie, his brother Frank asked me if I'd like to hold on to the guitar for a bit. I can't describe what it felt like to have come full circle from that high school to actually playing his guitar, which oozes The Toronto Sound. It IS that sound, although Donnie was the only one who could squeeze those sounds from it. I am merely a facsimile of what I learned from my friend. Not a gig or session goes by where I don't try to ask him for guidance. That guitar should be in every soul and music museum everywhere. I wouldn't have had the capacity to be any more thrilled if I had the chance to play Hendrix's Strat or George Harrison's Gretsch."

David Clayton-Thomas, lead vocalist of Blood, Sweat & Tears, said of working with LaBarge: "I've known Bernie LaBarge for decades. We've recorded and toured the world together, and working with him was always a joy. The ultimate groove player and one of the finest blues players alive."

LaBarge's other influences include Jimi Hendrix, George Harrison, Curtis Mayfield, James Burton, Eric Clapton, Carlos Santana, Albert King, Domenic Troiano, Steve Cropper, Jeff Beck, Steely Dan, Elvis Costello, Robin Trower, Howard Roberts, Elliott Randall, Rick Derringer, Elliot Easton, Peter Frampton, Gary Moore, Peter Green, and Kenny Marco.

Danny Weis of Lou Reed, Iron Butterfly, Bette Midler, and Rhinoceros stated "If you have Bernie LaBarge on your gig, you know you're covered. He always knows the right thing to play, and always has a smile. When he played with me on the Rhinoceros reunions gig in 2009, it felt like the original band was back together as he covered that guitar part perfectly. When you've got Bernie on stage, you're in for a good time. He's a great guitar player and a great friend."

== Discography ==
=== Albums ===
Title	Artist	Year	Label	Notes
Barging In	Bernie LaBarge	1983	Sony	

=== Singles ===
Title	Year	Label
Dream Away	1981	WEA
Can't Hold On Forever	1983	
Overnight Sensation	1984	
Listen to a Boy in Love	1985	
Turn On the Lights Before You Leave	1987	RCA

=== Selected collaborations and session work ===
Title	Artist	Year	Label
Rain	Catwalk	1972	Axe Records
Rain	Louise	1973	Axe Records
China	China	1978	
Long John Baldry	Long John Baldry	1980	EMI
Effective Immediately	Zwol	1981	EMI
Time Stands Still	Christopher Ward	1981	
Bit Parts	The Extras	1981	Ready Records
No More Bread and Butter	The Irish Rovers	1981	Attic Records
The Minx	Belinda Metz	1982	
Thrillz	Zwol	1982	A&M
Gowan	Lawrence Gowan	1982	
Postcard	Garnett Ford	1982	
Two Hound Blues	King Biscuit Boy	1982	
Love Me Closer	Hagood Hardy	1982	Attic Records
Priceless	Lisa Price	1983	
Champions	Canadian Brass	1983	Sony
The Curly Shuffle	The Knuckleheads	1983	Attic
Weekend	The Shakers	1983	
Rough Side of Town	Johnny Lovesin		A&M
A Test of Time	Darkroom		WEA
2WO	Strange Advance	1985	
Heartbeat	Priscilla Wright	1985	Attic Records
The Passerby	Tony Kosinec	1985	
Party with the Rovers	The Irish Rovers	1985	
Lookin' for a Heartache	P.J. Morris	1986	
Ronnie Hawkins	Ronnie Hawkins	1987	Epic Records
Silver Anniversary	The Irish Rovers	1989	
Aural Fixations	Kim Mitchell	1992	
Some Other Time	Tim Thorney	1993	
Mothers of Hope	John James	1994	Attic
Hip to the Tip	The Dexters	1995	
Feels Like Home	Cassandra Vasik	1995	
Greatest Hits	Kim Mitchell	1996	
All the Good'uns	Ian Tyson	1996	
Much Too Late	The Danny B Blues Band	1996	
Life Is But a Dream	Joel Feeney	1996	
Mother and Child	Paige Stroman	2001	
Side One	The Stickmen	2002	
Suzana Da Câmara	Suzana Da Câmara	2003	
Different	Cassandra Vasik	2003	
Side Two	The Stickmen	2003	
Get on the Bus	The Doodlebops	2005	
Fill Your Head with Rock	Kim Mitchell	2005	
In Concert – A Musical Biography	David Clayton-Thomas	2006	
I Love Being Here with You	Dione Taylor	2006	
Anthology, Vol. 1	Dave Rave	2006	
Christmas Lullabies to Create Memories	Paige Stroman	2006	
Jon Levine Band	Jon Levine Band	2007	
Classics	George Canyon	2007	
The Evergreens	David Clayton-Thomas	2007	
You Can't Make Peace	Riley / B / LaBarge	2007	
Headlights and Tailpipes	Willie Mack	2007	
Sing	Theo Tams	2008	
Disney Music Block Party	Various artists	2008	
Spectrum	David Clayton-Thomas	2009	
Salvation Radio	Brett Ryan	2010	
Drop the Needle in the Groove	Dean McTaggart	2010	
Soul Ballads	David Clayton-Thomas	2010	
Welcome to the Boogaloo Lounge	Lou Pomanti	2011	
When	Denis Keldie	2011	
A Blues for the New World	David Clayton-Thomas	2013	Universal
The Unicorn (50th Anniversary Remake)	The Irish Rovers	2019	

== Associated acts ==
- The Underground Taxi Service (1967)
- The Royal Banke (1968–1969)
- Stem (1969–1972)
- Rain (1972–1973)
- The Jax 'n Lynda (1973–1974)
- George Olliver's Blue-Eyed Brotherhood (1974)
- Hot Dog (1974–1975)
- Whizz (1975–1976)
- Stingaree (1976–1977)
- Bond (1978–1979)
- Sweet Blindness (1979)
- Zwol (1980)
- Kearney, King, McBride & LaBarge (1980–1981)
- The Irish Rovers (1983–1990)
- Mind Over Matter (1987)
- The Danny B Blues Band (1989–present)
- Cassandra Vasik (1992–1994)
- The Dexters (1994–2014)
- The Incontinentals (1999–2000)
- Off the Record (1999–2002)
- The Stickmen (2002–2006)
- David Clayton-Thomas (2005–2009)
- Rhinoceros (2009)
