= Billy Bryans =

- Born: William Taylor Bryans; September 15, 1947; Montreal, Quebec, Canada
- Died: April 23, 2012 (aged 64) Toronto, Ontario, Canada
- Genres: Funk, rock, world
- Occupations: Musician, songwriter, producer
- Instruments: Vocals, drums, percussions
- Years active: 1967–2012
- Labels: RCA, Current WAVE-2
- Formerly of: The Parachute Club, Dutch Mason, Downchild Blues Band, M.G. & The Escorts

William Taylor Bryans (September 15, 1947 – April 23, 2012) was a Canadian percussionist, songwriter, music producer and DJ, known as one of the founders of The Parachute Club, among other accomplishments in music. As a producer, he worked on projects for artists as diverse as Dutch Mason, Raffi, Lillian Allen and the Downchild Blues Band. He was born in Montreal, but spent most of his adult life in Toronto, and was particularly supportive of world music as both a promoter and publicist, focusing on bringing Caribbean, Cuban and Latin American music to a wider audience.

== Career ==
Bryans' childhood was spent in Pointe-Claire, Quebec, where he was associated with his first professional band, M.G. and The Escorts. This band released three singles, and primarily played in the area bounded by Montreal, Ottawa, Brockville and Kingston, including gigs at Expo 67 and as the opening act at a Montreal concert by The Beach Boys. Bryans was also a high school friend of Jack Layton, and was credited by Layton with giving him the advice that led to his being elected president of their high school student council.

After graduating with a degree in English literature from Sir George Williams University, Bryans moved from Montreal to Toronto with his group Theodore's Smokeshop in 1970, and soon developed a reputation as a musician, engineer and record producer in the burgeoning counterculture scene around Rochdale College. He quickly became associated with the Downchild Blues Band, including as producer of the band's first notable hit single, "Flip, Flop and Fly", and as the engineer on the band's seminal debut album, Bootleg (1971), thought to be the first artist-produced and independently distributed album in Canadian history. In 1972, Theodore's Smokeshop, now renamed Horn, recorded its only album, On the People's Side, with Bryans performing as percussionist, sound remixer and co-producer. (Note: Horn was composed of Bryans on drums, with Les Clackett (vocals), Bruce Barron (guitar), Alan Duffy (bass), Gary Hynes (guitar), Wayne Jackson (trumpet) and David De Launey (keyboards). Both Bryans and Jackson would later become members of The Downchild Blues Band, with Bryans also acting as Downchild's producer. See Vernon Joynson, Dreams, Nightmares & Fantasies (Canada) for band membership and discography.)

During the 1970s, Bryans continued to develop his reputation as a musician, engineer and producer, working on records by the Time Twins, The BobCats and the Downchild Blues Band. Daniel Lanois credited Bryans' sonic experimentation as one of the inspirations behind the development of his own distinctive production style.

In 1979, he was introduced to Lorraine Segato, who was then the lead singer and a principal songwriter with Mama Quilla II. This began a long musical collaboration. Their first collaboration was the band V, playing a mix of funk, soca and reggae music with Mojah, then the lead singer of the Toronto reggae band Truth and Rights. Bryans also sometimes performed with Mama Quilla II; as the only man performing with an otherwise all-female band, his bandmates jokingly gave him a T-shirt which read "Token Male".

The next collaboration of Bryans and Segato was the Parachute Club. Prior to that time, Bryans was the drummer for the Toronto new wave and art punk band The Government, while Segato continued her association with Mama Quilla II. The Parachute Club was formed in the summer of 1982, in response to an invitation to Bryans to play at a party at the Toronto International Film Festival. Based on the performance invitation, Bryans and Segato formed a band which became The Parachute Club. While working with Parachute Club, Bryans also continued to work as a producer, most notably on Lillian Allen's Juno Award winning reggae albums Revolutionary Tea Party and Conditions Critical. In 1987, he also recorded a rearrangement of Moe Koffman's "Curried Soul", which CBC Radio One used as the introductory music to the second half-hour of its nightly news program As It Happens until September 2013.

Following Parachute Club's breakup, Bryans continued to work as a producer for artists such as AfroNubians, Raffi and Punjabi by Nature, as well as doing session work for musicians such as George Fox, Loketo and Buffy Sainte-Marie. In 1989, Bryans and Aaron Davis received a Genie Award nomination for Best Original Score for their work on George Mihalka's film Office Party. In 1991, he coordinated a concert series for world beat musicians at Ontario Place and produced The Gathering, a compilation album of Canadian world music artists which won the inaugural Juno Award for World Music Album of the Year at the Juno Awards of 1992. In 1997, Bryans was one of the producers and mixers associated with the film soundtrack to the Disney movie Jungle 2 Jungle, which featured much African music.

In the 2000s, he focused extensively on promoting Latin music in Canada, playing a prominent role in the emergence of artists such as Laura Fernandez, Aline Morales and Alex Cuba.

In 2006, Bryans announced that he was suffering from lung cancer, and was incapacitated for a period of months, commencing in April of that year. In August 2006, in celebration of his recovery, a number of notable Toronto musicians performed a benefit in Bryans' honour. In early 2012, it was announced that Bryans' cancer had returned and he was in palliative care. Another benefit concert was held on April 19 at Toronto's Lula Lounge to help defray his healthcare costs. He died a few days later in Toronto, on April 23, at age 64.

== Discography ==
=== Musician ===
- 1972 – Horn, On The People's Side (Special)
- 1975 – Downchild, Ready to Go (GRT)
- 1983 – Parachute Club, The Parachute Club (Current/RCA)
- 1984 – Parachute Club, At The Feet of the Moon (Current/RCA)
- 1985 – Parachute Club, Moving Thru the Moonlight (Current/RCA; remixes)
- 1986 – Parachute Club, Small Victories (Current/RCA)
- 1990 – Raffi, Evergreen Everblue (Rounder)
- 1994 – Parachute Club, Wild Zone: The Essential Parachute Club (BMG)

=== Producer ===
- 1972 – Horn, On The People's Side (Special)
- 1974 – David Campbell, Through Arawak Eyes (Development Education Centre)
- 1977 – Downchild, So Far: A Collection of Our Best (Co-producer, with John Capek and Donnie Walsh; reissued 2007 by Koch and Linus.)
- 1980 – Downchild, We Deliver (Attic)
- 1982 – Downchild, But I'm on the Guest List (Attic)
- 1986 – Eyuphuro, Mama Mosambiki (Atlantic; co-producer, with Bruce Burron)
- 1986 – Lillian Allen, Revolutionary Tea Party
- 1988 – Lillian Allen, Conditions Critical
- 1990 – The Phantoms, Pleasure Puppets (A&M/Spy; co-producer, with Kevin Doyle)
- 1990 – Raffi, Evergreen Everblue (Rounder; co-producer, with Raffi)
- 1992 - Still Life "Signs of Life"
- 1997 – Jungle 2 Jungle Soundtrack (Disney; specific track producer)
- 2003 – Various Artists, Mother Africa (Musica Alternativa; specific track producer)
- 2011 – Laura Fernandez, Un Solo Beso

=== Engineer/mixer ===
- 1972 – Downchild Blues Band, Bootleg (Special)
- 1972 – Horn, On The People's Side (Special)
- 1986 – Eyuphuro, Mama Mosambiki (Atlantic; co-mixing, with Bruce Burron)
- 1997 – Jungle 2 Jungle Soundtrack (Disney; specific track mixer)
- 2003 – Various Artists, Mother Africa (Musica Alternativa; specific track mixer)

=== Other ===
- 1988 – Soundtrack Composer (with Aaron Davis, composer and member of the Holly Cole Trio), Office Party
