= Milkwood (band) =

- Origin: Toronto, Ontario, Canada
- Genres: Rock
- Years active: March 1969–November 1969
- Past members: Louis McKelvey; Mary Lou Gauthier; Malcolm Tomlinson

Milkwood was an Anglo-Canadian rock band formed in Toronto in March 1969 by former Influence guitarist Danny Milkwood with future Celine Dion backing singer Mary Lou Gauthier and English multi-instrumentalist Malcolm Tomlinson, who'd worked previously with future Jethro Tull guitarist Martin Barre in The Motivation, The Penny Peeps and Gethsemane.

== Origins ==
Milkwood was the brainchild of Louis McKelvey (born on October 31, 1943, in Killorglin, County Kerry, Ireland), who formed a tentative line up after he left Montreal group, Influence in late 1968. Through his previous band, McKelvey had befriended former King Curtis sideman, drummer Ron Frankel (born in April 1947 in Montreal), who had previously played in The Soul Mates (and with his wife Mary Lou Gauthier) in the lounge band, Five of a Kind before joining King Curtis & The King Pins in early 1968.

In July, McKelvey returned to England for six months and reunited with his colleague drummer/singer Malcolm Tomlinson (born on June 16, 1946, in Isleworth, Middlesex, England), from early 1960s band, Jeff Curtis & The Flames. Tomlinson was currently playing with Gethsemane (featuring future Jethro Tull guitarist Martin Barre), and had recently done a BBC radio session with Elton John.

When Gethsemane split up in December, Tomlinson returned to Toronto with McKelvey in January 1969 to put together Milkwood.

Adding ex-Five Bells bass player Ron Blackwell (born on July 27, 1948, in Montreal), the band played at the Penny Farthing in Toronto in early May. According to Cashbox, Jimi Hendrix popped in one night and caught the group. He reported seeing a great band with two drummers. On May 25, Milkwood performed at the Rock Pile with The Kensington Market Band and Grand Funk Railroad.

== Polydor Records and Jerry Ragovoy ==
Milkwood had sent a four-track demo to Polydor Records in late April 1969 and, according to Billboard, the label signed the band before it had played a single show.

During sessions in July, Blackwell left and former Influence member Jack Geisinger (born in March 1945 in Czech Republic) was brought down to New York to help finish an album, produced by Jerry Ragovoy at the Hit Factory.

In August, the band embarked on a six-week Canadian tour. Meanwhile, the album, which was slated for release in September to coincide with an American tour, was shelved.

The band's greatest claim to fame is that it appeared at Toronto's Rock ‘N’ Roll Revival concert on September 13, alongside The Plastic Ono Band, Gene Vincent, Alice Cooper and others. John Lennon and Yoko Ono went on after Milkwood, with Ono emerging from a bag on stage.

On September 19, Milkwood performed at York University with Teegarden and Van Winkle and the following month (on October 11), appeared at the Electric Circus. Shortly after a show at the Hawk's Nest on October 17, Milkwood travelled to Ottawa to play some shows and ran into Van Morrison at Le Hibou. Internal differences, however, led to the group's demise in November 1969.

== Aftermath ==
McKelvey, Tomlinson and Geisinger reappeared in Damage. Frankel later did sessions for Jesse Winchester while Mary Lou Gauthier recorded a solo single, "In The Summertime" c/w "Come Run" for Polydor and sang for several years with Celine Dion at Caesars Palace in Las Vegas. She later recorded material with McKelvey and Tomlinson in Toronto. Blackwell is a computer consultant and lives in Las Vegas. Frankel and Gauthier later became the parents of voice actress Holly Gauthier-Frankel.

Malcolm Tomlinson recorded several solo albums for A&M Records and toured in support of them, opening for such artists as The Average White Band. Tomlinson died in Toronto in 2016. Louis McKelvey continued writing, recording, and performing with friends until his death in 2017 in Toronto.

== Trivia ==
It was reported in the Canadian music press (Circus magazine) at the time that The Band was interested in recording with Mary Lou Gauthier.

== Discography ==
- Unreleased LP on Polydor Records
