= Jarema =

Jarema is a surname. Notable people with the surname include:

- Maria Jarema (1908–1958), Polish painter, sculptor, scenographer, and actress
- Stephen J. Jarema (c. 1905–1988), American lawyer and politician

== See also ==
- Yarema
