= Yarema =

Yarema (Ukrainian: Ярема) is a given name and surname derived from the Ukrainian adaptation of the Biblical name Jeremiah. Alternative transliterations include Jarema and Iarema.

== People ==
=== Given name ===
- Jeremi (Yarema) Wiśniowiecki (1612–1651), aristocrat in the Polish-Lithuanian Commonwealth
- Yarema Kavatsiv (born 1986), Ukrainian footballer
- Yarema Kovaliv (born 1976), Ukrainian administrator

=== Surname ===
- Brendan Yarema (born 1976), Canadian ice hockey player
- Dymytriy (Yarema) (1915–2000), Ukrainian Orthodox patriarch
- Tyler Yarema (born 1972), Canadian singer/songwriter
- Vitaliy Yarema (born 1963), Ukrainian politician
