= Malcolm Tomlinson =

English musician

- Born: 16 June 1946; Isleworth, Middlesex, England
- Origin: London, England
- Died: 2 April 2016 (aged 69) Toronto, Ontario, Canada
- Genre: Rock
- Occupations: Musician, songwriter
- Instruments: Drums, vocals, guitar
- Years active: 1962–2016
- Labels: EMI, Liberty, Polydor, True North, Elektra, A&M

Malcolm Tomlinson (16 June 1946 – 2 April 2016) was an English musician, particularly active as a recording artist in the late 1970s.

== History ==
=== UK years: early 1960s–1969 ===
Tomlinson was born in Isleworth, Middlesex, England, and attended Spring Grove Grammar School, where he was classmates with drummer Mick Underwood. A multi-instrumentalist, singer and songwriter, he started out in the early 1960s playing drums in West London band The Panthers. In January 1963, he joined Jeff Curtis & The Flames, regulars at the Ealing Club. The group recorded a five-track acetate with Joe Meek before Tomlinson left in mid-1964 to join The Del Mar Trio with singer Jimmy Marsh (born James Marsh, 9 April 1941, Salem, Carmarthenshire, Wales), guitarist Allen Bevan and bass player Tony Rowland. In February 1965, the group recorded four tracks for EMI at Abbey Road under the supervision of Bob Barratt. Two months later, the band changed name to James Deane & The London Cats and headed for southern Germany where the band spent a year playing clubs, including in Furth, Munich and Nuremberg. The drummer also spent three months working with a German band.

In June 1966, Tomlinson and Marsh joined forces with two members of The Noblemen – bass player Bryan Stevens (born 13 November 1941, Lha Datu, North Borneo) and keyboard player and singer Mike Ketley (born Michael Ketley, 1 October 1947, Balham, South London) – in a new version of The Noblemen, which changed name in November to The Motivation. The new Noblemen line up advertised in Melody Maker for a saxophone player and duly recruited two players from Birmingham combo, The Moonrakers, Chris Rodger (born Christopher Rodger, 16 October 1946, Solihull, Warwickshire) and Martin Barre.

The Motivation supported visiting US soul acts including Lee Dorsey, Edwin Starr, Alvin Robinson, The Vibrations and The Coasters. They also toured under their own name, sharing the bill with The Herd (twice at the Marquee), Cream and The Tremeloes. They also spent six weeks in Romeplaying at the Piper Club during April–May 1967. By early June, Marsh and Rodger had left and the band brought in former Clayton Squares' singer Denny Alexander (born Denny Alexander Thomas, 10 March 1946, Liverpool, Lancashire), changing name to The Penny Peeps later that summer. Barre then dedicated his time to lead guitar.

The Penny Peeps signed to Liberty Records and recorded two singles, including "Model Village" and some further demos (some of which have subsequently been released by Rev-Ola) before Alexander left and the remaining members evolved into blues band, Gethsemane. The group shared the bill with notable acts including Jethro Tull, Fleetwood Mac and David Bowie among others. In mid-December 1968 Barre joined Jethro Tull and Gethsemane broke up.

While Tomlinson was with Gethsemane, he participated in a BBC radio session at Aeolian Hall with Elton John on 28 October alongside guitarist Caleb Quaye and bass player Boots Slade. The line-up recorded three tracks, including "Lady Samantha".

=== Canada: 1969–2016 ===
Tomlinson subsequently moved to Toronto in March 1969 with his former colleague from Jeff Curtis & The Flames, guitarist Louis McKelvey (born Louis Campbell McKelvey, 31 October 1943, Killorglin, County Kerry, Ireland). The pair formed the group, Milkwood, which appeared at the Toronto Rock and Roll Revival concert on 13 September 1969. The band also recorded an unreleased LP for Polydor Records with Jerry Ragovoy producing. The pair also appeared on an unreleased LP by Toronto singer Jay Telfer while Tomlinson guested on Life's eponymous album for Polydor Records. The pair then formed a new band, Damage, but this was short-lived and during the early 1970s, Tomlinson played in a succession of local bands, including Syrinx, and a latter day version of Elektra band, Rhinoceros.

In 1973, Tomlinson appeared on Bill King's album Goodbye Superdad and John Mills Cockell's Heartbeat. He then joined Rick James' original Stone City Band and appeared on an LP that was never released. He later recorded with the band Bearfoot and then formed the Malcolm Tomlinson Band. The group recorded two albums in 1977 and 1979 for A&M Records and opened for the Average White Band and Meatloaf.

On 2 June 2007, Tomlinson was behind the kit for a one-off reunion of the seminal 1960s Toronto band Kensington Market. He also doubled up to play with Luke & The Apostles.

He was most recently active with The Malcolm Tomlinson Band, which included Gerry Markman – guitar (The Sensations), Steve Hunter – keyboard (M/D Hair & Rocky Horror Show) and Glenn Olive – bass, and recently contributed to an LP by the Cameo Blues Band.

Tomlinson died aged 69 in Toronto, Ontario, Canada on 2 April 2016.
