= Evergreen Everblue =

Studio album by Raffi
- Released: June 4, 1990
- Recorded: Early 1990
- Studio: Sounds Interchange (tracks 1–5 and 7–11), Reaction Studios (track 6)
- Genre: Children's
- Length: 38:58
- Label: MCA, Rounder
- Producer: Raffi, Billy Bryans

Raffi chronology
Everything Grows (1987)	Evergreen Everblue (1990)	Bananaphone (1994)

Singles from Evergreen Everblue
- 1. "Evergreen Everblue"; 2. "Big Beautiful Planet"; 3. "Clean Rain"

Professional ratings
Review scores
Source	Rating
Allmusic	4/5 stars

Evergreen Everblue is a music album by popular children's entertainer Raffi, released in 1990. The album was aimed at an older audience than most of Raffi's children's albums. The songs on this album are ecology-themed. It was Raffi's first album released by MCA Records and the first album by platinum-selling artist not to be packaged in a longbox.

== Background ==
After Raffi's record deal with A&M Records expired, Jeff Bywater, who at the time served as the vice president of marketing at MCA Records arranged for a lunch with Raffi and some other MCA personnel, including their "resident ecologist", Garrett De Bell. Bywater believed that "having our ecologist at the table sent a clear message to Raffi that we were willing to do the job--and had the consciousness level to do it." After a contract was crafted and submitted to the chairman of MCA Music Entertainment Group, Bywater informed them that Raffi and his manager insisted on not packaging Raffi’s albums in longboxes, even at the expense of incurring a reduction in album sales.

I simply believe that the excessive packaging of cassettes and CDs can no longer be tolerated in a global environmental crisis. If there's enough pressure from artists and their audience, the buying public, I think record stores will respond by eliminating the longbox.

— Raffi

Pursuant to the recording contract, MCA Records packaged the album in a jewel case as opposed to a longbox. Raffi decided to forgo the sale of his music in longboxes to reduce packaging waste.

Record store retailers, including Musicland, Music Plus, and Trans World Corp. refused to stock the album, in part due to their belief that it would make the products more susceptible to shoplifting and require them to refit their store fixtures to merchandise the jewel boxes. One record store executive from Kemp Mill Music lambasted the decision to package Evergreen Everblue in a jewel case, saying that "Raffi is as insensitive to retailers as he is sensitive about the environment." Record World decided to carry the album in a limited capacity, with the organization's vice president of purchasing and distribution saying that they were carrying it "very lightly", adding that the jewel case packaging did not "fit in with the way we merchandise [our] stores". Raffi commented on his decision to exclusively carry the album in a jewel case, saying that “we don't have a divine mandate to sell records...these are times that call for sacrifices on all our parts."

== Critical reception ==
In its review for AllMusic, William Ruhlmann expressed his opinion that the album's subject matter pivoted away from themes targeted towards a younger audience in favor of topics related to pollution, contamination, and nuclear waste. He called the album "a full-blown work of musical advocacy in which he sang one song after another extolling the natural world and occasionally decrying its despoliation." Writing for TIME, John Moody said that the album was "not merely inappropriate for toddlers; it is a warning screech of apocalypse."

== Track listing ==
All tracks written by Raffi

1. "Intro/Evergreen, Everblue" – 4:51
2. "Mama's Kitchen" – 3:31
3. "Big Beautiful Planet" – 3:23
4. "Alive and Dreaming" – 3:46
5. "Where I Live" – 4:05
6. "What's the Matter With Us" – 3:42
7. "Our Dear, Dear Mother" – 3:15
8. "Just Like the Sun" – 2:44
9. "Clean Rain" – 3:07
10. "One Light, One Sun" – 2:09
11. "We Are Not Alone" – 4:10

== Personnel ==
Musicians

- Raffi, Bjorn Anderson, Dennis Pendrith, Nancy Walker, Dave Gray, Mitch Lewis, Memo Acevedo, High Marsh, Bill Bryans, Tom Szczesniak, Donovan Black, Charles Sinclair, Rupert Harvey, Quammie Williams, Devon Martin, Al Cross, Dirk Montage

Vocalists

- Raffi, Thandie Mpumlwana, Sifiso Ntulli, Julie Massi, Holly Cole, Devon Martin, Donovan Black, Charles Sinclair, Rupert Harvey, Quammie Williams, Orion Ensemble, Wayne St. John Choir

Technical

- Raffi – production, design concept and art
- Billy Bryans – production
- Kevin Doyle; Danny Tremblay – recording and mixing (tracks 1–5 and 7–11)
- Bruce Fleming – audio engineering (tracks 1–5 and 7–11)
- Ormand Jobin – recording (track 6)
- Jeff McCulloch; Scott Keenan – mixing (track 6)
- Mike Jones; Paul Edwards – additional mixing
- Fred/Alan Inc. – design concept and art
- Davies and Starr – photography
