= Office Party =

- Directed by: George Mihalka
- Written by: Stephen Zoller
- Based on: Office Party by Michael A. Gilbert
- Produced by: George Flak
- Starring: David Warner; Michael Ironside; Kate Vernon; Jayne Eastwood
- Cinematography: Ludek Bogner
- Edited by: Stan Cole
- Music by: Billy Bryans; Aaron Davis
- Production company: SC Entertainment
- Distributed by: Miramax (United States); Flair Communications (International and India)
- Release date: December 10, 1988 (Florence)
- Running time: 90 minutes
- Country: Canada
- Language: English

Office Party, also known as Hostile Takeover in some releases, is a Canadian thriller film directed by George Mihalka and released in 1988. An adaptation of Michael A. Gilbert's 1981 crime novel Office Party, the film stars David Warner as Eugene Brackin, a repressed accountant who suddenly takes three of his coworkers hostage with no apparent motive or demands.

The film also stars Michael Ironside, Kate Vernon and Jayne Eastwood as the hostages.

Billy Bryans and Aaron Davis received a Genie Award nomination for Best Original Score at the 10th Genie Awards.

== Cast ==
- David Warner - Eugene Brackin
- Michael Ironside - Larry Gaylord
- Kate Vernon - Sally
- Jayne Eastwood - Joan Talmage
- Will Lyman - Smolen
- Graeme Campbell - Hollis
- Anthony Sherwood - Garlas
- John Vernon - Mayor
- Patrick Patterson - Security Guard
- Winston Gaddishaw - Marksman
- Helen Beavis - Mrs. Hampton
- Cindy Girling - Mrs. Gaylord
- Kenneth McGregor - Cop #1 (as Ken McGregor)
- François Klanfer - NY Boss
- Rex Hagon - V.P. of Felton
