= Blank-Fest =

Annual benefit concert

Blank-Fest is an annual benefit concert, usually held one or two weeks before Christmas, to collect blankets for the homeless. It was founded in 1997 in Nyack, New York, United States, by Kenn Rowell, frontman for the New York City–based band, The Baghdaddios.

== History ==
=== Origin ===
In 1996, Rowell collected blankets from friends to dispense amongst New York City's homeless on Christmas Eve. From then on, he decided to make the drive an annual occurrence, but his friends told him that they had no more blankets to donate, as Rowell had taken them all the previous year. He therefore decided to hold a benefit concert where attendees could contribute one blanket of any condition instead of a cover charge for admission to the show, which would then be delivered to the city's homeless by Rowell and volunteers on Christmas Eve. The first Blank-Fest was held at a club in Nyack called Mai Place, and collected 40 blankets. The next year saw 70 blankets donated at the same club, since renamed The Loft. After that local entrepreneur Chuck Debruyn convinced Rowell to move the show to Bruxelles, a bar-restaurant that he had recently bought into, as it had more room for parking, and a guaranteed walk-in crowd. The show has been held at Bruxelles ever since.

=== Growth ===
Since its inception, Rowell estimates that Blank-Fest has collected over 10,000 blankets for the homeless, with the number increasing every year except 2001. The event has steadily increased in exposure through local radio, the internet and the press, including featured articles in the New York Daily News and mentions in the New York Post. Satellite shows have been formed in other states, cities and countries. Donations have increased to such an extent that volunteers have had to extend distribution of blankets over multiple nights, starting on Christmas Eve. Excess donations are also distributed to homeless shelters.

== Concerts ==
MCed by Rowell's band, The Baghdaddios, the first Blank-Fest featured a handful of local, Hudson Valley area–based groups, including Joe D'Urso & Stone Caravan, The Wheel, and Chuck Debruyn, who performed as a solo artist. The festival has primarily featured local independent music acts, but has also attracted songwriters and bands with ties to major labels, including EMI artist Patti Rothberg, pedal steel guitar great Buddy Cage, former Misfits guitarist and founder of The Undead, Bobby Steele, Soulfly lead guitarist Marc Rizzo, Sirius Radio personality Meg Griffin, international jazz composer Mike McGinnis, and the founder of the Anti-folk movement, Lach.

=== Satellite shows ===
In 2006, New Jersey–based independent artist and activist Richard Kubicz read about Blank-Fest in the Daily News and proposed a "sister show" at a club in Garwood, New Jersey. The first Blank-Fest-NJ, promoted through Kubicz's D.I.Y. music website Let's Rock America, collected 200 blankets, which were donated to a homeless shelter in Cranford and received coverage in the Bergen County press in 2006. Blank-Fest UK was founded in Nottingham, England, after a local recording studio owner heard an interview with The Baghdaddios on the British Armed Forces Radio Network, BFBS Radio One, during the group's tour of England in Summer 2007. After hearing about both the American and UK editions, Ontario-based photographer Gaynor Fletcher approached Rowell about a Blank-Fest Canada show. Debuting in 2007 in Guelph, Ontario, the inaugural Canadian event featured Canadian folk artist James Gordon and received coverage from the Canadian media, raising over 100 blankets.

In addition to these shows former Baghdaddios bassist, John Sidoti, worked with local internet radio personality Ron Purtee to organise the first Blank-Fest Wisconsin, also in 2007, in the Milwaukee-area suburb of Racine.

There are now eight Blank-Fest shows in seven metropolitan areas in three countries; 2008 saw the addition of three additional shows: Blank-Fest Florida, Lake City, near Gainesville in Northern Florida, and Blank-Fest VA, in Richmond, Virginia. Promoters in Bridgeport, Connecticut, and Calgary and Ottawa in Canada began working on additional Blank-Fest shows in December 2009. The first Blank-Fest Quebec, also the first Blank-Fest show to take place after Christmas, was held on February 21, 2009, collecting 503 blankets.
