= Flip, Flop and Fly =

Single by Big Joe Turner
- B-side: "Ti-Ri-Lee"
- Released: February 1955
- Recorded: New York City, January 28, 1955
- Genre: Rhythm and blues, Jump blues
- Length: 2:49
- Label: Atlantic
- Songwriters: Charles E. Calhoun; Lou Willie Turner

Big Joe Turner singles chronology
| "Well All Right" (1954) | "Flip, Flop and Fly" (1955) | "Hide and Seek" (1955) |

"Flip, Flop and Fly" is a song recorded by Big Joe Turner in 1955. Called a "prototypical rocker", it was recorded by several early rock and roll performers. In 1973, a version by the Downchild Blues Band reached the record singles chart in Canada.

== Original song ==
"Flip, Flop and Fly" has an arrangement similar to Big Joe Turner's 1954 number 1 R&B chart hit "Shake, Rattle and Roll". Music critic Cub Koda suggests that "leftover verses [from the 'Shake, Rattle and Roll' recording session] were then recycled into Turner's follow-up hit, 'Flip, Flop and Fly.'" Both are up-tempo twelve-bar blues with a strong backbeat. "Flip, Flop and Fly" reached number 2 on Billboard magazine's R&B chart in 1955, less than one year after "Shake, Rattle and Roll".

Accompanying Turner on vocals are the song's co-writer Jesse Stone on piano, Al Sears on tenor sax, Connie Kay on drums, and unidentified trumpet, alto sax, baritone sax, guitar, and bass players. Turner subsequently recorded several live versions of the song.

== Other notable versions ==
On January 28th, 1956, Elvis Presley performed a medley of the song along with "Shake, Rattle and Roll" on CBS's The Dorsey Brothers Stage Show as part of his television debut. In 1973 and 1974 he also frequently performed the song within medleys with other famous rock and roll classics.

In 1973, a rendition by the Canadian Downchild Blues Band reached number 35 on the RPM 100 singles chart. It was the first, and highest ranked, of four songs on the Canadian charts and is included on their second album Straight Up (1974), In 1978, a rendition by the American the Blues Brothers appeared on their album Briefcase Full of Blues. In 2000, a rendition by the American Ellis Hall was used on the soundtrack of the 2000 animated comedy film, Chicken Run.
