= The Partland Brothers =

Canadian musical group

- Origin: Colgan, Ontario, Canada
- Genres: Pop rock
- Years active: 1979–present
- Labels: Capitol Records, Kinetic Records, Manhattan Records
- Members: G.P. Partland; Chris Partland; Robin Partland
- Past members: Tom Lewis; John Bride; Richard Evans; Greg Critchley; Mike Skinner
- Website: http://www.thepartlandbrothers.com/

The Partland Brothers are a Canadian pop/rock band, best known for their 1986 hit single "Soul City". Originally fronted by brothers Chris and G. P. Partland with supporting session musicians, more recently they have recorded and performed as a trio with their brother Robin Partland.

== Biography ==
Originally from the small community of Colgan in Ontario's Simcoe County, they played in area bands before moving their act to Toronto in 1979 and forming Oliver Heavyside. In 1982, they entered and won the "Q107 Homegrown" contest, which attracted the attention of Capitol Records.

Their first album as the Partland Brothers, Electric Honey, was released in 1986. It was described by Cashbox as an "appealing exercise in pop/rock", and reached number 146 on the Billboard 200. The single "Soul City", a soaring anthem featuring the brothers' distinctive close-harmony vocals which saw them compared to a more contemporary version of The Righteous Brothers, was a Top 40 hit in both Canada and the United States. This success earned them tours with The Moody Blues and The Beach Boys in the United States, as well as headline gigs of their own at home in Canada and television appearances on American Bandstand and The Late Show with Arsenio Hall.

Their live band engaged seasoned live performers, including Tom Lewis (bass), John Bride (guitar), Richard Evans (keyboards), Greg Critchley (drums), and Mike Skinner (sax). Produced by Vini Poncia, the album was reissued in 1987 with the Jim Vallance-produced new song "One Chance", which is still played on many adult radio stations today. That same year, their song "Outside the City" was featured in the horror film Hello Mary Lou: Prom Night II.

At the Juno Awards of 1987, they received a nomination for Most Promising New Group.

Management struggles ensued, and it took until 1990 for them to record and release their second album, Between Worlds. The album was supported with a smaller-scale Canadian tour.

It was another three years and a label change before their next studio album, Part Land, Part Water, was released on Kinetic Records. Part Land, Part Water was recorded at Metalworks Studios in Mississauga. Production was given over to Ken Greer, who also played lead guitars, pedal steel, mandolin, bass, and all keyboards on the album. Occasional dates ensued, but the band chose to stay close to home rather than tackling an all-out tour.

Following Part Land, Part Water, the band were relatively inactive for a number of years until 2002, when they performed at a Ronnie Hawkins tribute show at Massey Hall. Afterward they returned to touring as an opening act for Hawkins, and performed at various benefit concerts before relaunching their own tour of Southern Ontario. In 2009, they released This Is Who I Am, their first album of new material since Part Land, Part Water. The album included "That's My Home", a charity single the band recorded as a benefit for the Canadian Forces Military Families Fund. They followed up in 2010 with Every Now...and Again, a compilation of songs from throughout their career.

In recent years, Chris Partland has played a number of shows in the Greater Toronto Area as a solo artist. In 2016, he attributed the band's lack of activity to one of his brothers recently having lost two fingers in an accident, but stated that the band still planned to return to performing in the future.

== Members ==
- G.P. Partland – (vocals, guitars)
- Chris Partland – (vocals, guitars)
- Robin Partland – (drums)

== Discography ==
=== Studio albums ===
- Electric Honey (1986)
- Between Worlds (1990)
- Part Land, Part Water (1993)
- This Is Who I Am (2009)

=== Compilation albums ===
- Every Now... And Again (2010)

=== Singles ===
Title	Release	Peak chart positions		Album
Title	Release	CAN	US	Album
"Soul City"	1986	25	27	Electric Honey
"Electric Honey"	1987	?	—	Electric Honey
"One Chance"	1987	?	—	Electric Honey
"Honest Man"	1990	24	—	Between Worlds
"Lift Me Up"	1993	38	—	Part Land Part Water
"—" denotes a recording that did not chart or was not released in that territory.
