= Tyler Yarema =

Canadian Toronto-based singer/songwriter (born 1972)

Tyler Richard Yarema (born October 27, 1972) is a Canadian Toronto-based singer-songwriter. A self-taught pianist, Yarema's early influences in music stem from the stride genre, and he takes his cues from musicians such as Willie "the Lion" Smith, Fats Waller, Pete Johnson, Lionel Hampton, and Duke Ellington. Yarema's bands specialize in a unique hybrid of blues, jump-blues, swing, boogie-woogie, and original popular music.

== Career ==
After moving from Thunder Bay to Toronto in 1994, Yarema became a nightclub regular. Yarema gained traction by playing alongside Jeff Healey, Chris Whiteley, King Biscuit Boy, Downchild Blues Band, and Doug Riley before forming his own band entitled Tyler Yarema and His Rhythm. Yarema has since played, produced, arranged, and sung on over 40 albums.

Currently, Yarema is working on a recording project through the vehicle of his band Empire Avenue that steers away from traditional jazz and blues and focuses on an original sounding adult pop.

Tyler joined Downchild Blues Band in 2021, after the death of their long-serving keyboard player Michael Fonfara.

== Awards and recognitions ==
- 1998 – New Artist of The Year – Maple Blues Awards (winner)
- 1999 – Piano Player of the Year – Maple Blues Awards (winner)
- 2002 – Best Keyboard Player – Now Magazine (winner)
