= Jane Vasey =

- Born: October 16, 1949
- Origin: Canada
- Died: July 6, 1982 (aged 32)
- Genres: Blues
- Occupation: Pianist
- Instrument: Piano

Jane Elizabeth Vasey (October 16, 1949 – July 6, 1982) was a Canadian blues piano player, best known for her years playing with the Downchild Blues Band. Vasey played with the band from 1973 until her death, from leukemia, on July 6, 1982.

== Biography ==
Prior to joining the Downchild Blues Band, Vasey earned a Master's degree in Music from the University of Manitoba. She also earned a Bachelor of Arts degree, majoring in Art. One of the first blues artists she heard was Otis Spann; one of her first recordings with the Downchild Blues Band was Otis Spann's "Must Have Been The Devil". Her song, "Trying To Keep Her 88s Straight" was considered to be a minor Canadian hit in 1980. Vasey played on all of the singles released by the band.

One of Vasey's last engagements was in January 1982, supporting Eddie "Cleanhead" Vinson, playing three sets per night over the course of a week at Toronto's Albert's Hall (above the Brunswick House Tavern), despite being weakened by illness. Vinson later described her as "one of the good ones".

After her death, The Jane Vasey Memorial Scholarship was established at Brandon University, to sponsor keyboard students. The scholarship fund was established by Vasey's late parents, Ross and Dorothy Vasey, as well as The Downchild Blues Band, and each year distributes scholarships to students in piano performance. The initial benefit performance in support of the scholarship fund occurred at the Brunswick Tavern, within weeks of her death. In addition to the Downchild Blues Band, such artists as Sunnyland Slim, John Hammond and David Wilcox appeared in support of the fund. The Downchild Blues Band continues to fund the scholarship through benefit performances.

Vasey is buried at Brookside Cemetery, in Winnipeg.

== Discography (with Downchild Blues Band) ==
=== Singles ===
- 1973 "Flip, Flop And Fly" (No. 35 Can.)
- 1974 "Flip, Flop And Fly" [re-issue] (Special)
- 1974 "I've Got Everything I Need" (Almost)
- 1974 "Tell Your Mother" (Special) (No. 54 Can.)
- 1975 "Goin' Dancin"
- 1976 "Old Ma Belle" (No. 67 Can.)
- 1980 "I've Been A Fool" (Attic)
- 1980 "Tryin' to Keep Her 88's Straight"/"Oh Oh" (Attic) (No. 71 Can.)
- 1981 "Hey Hey Little Girl"/"Drivin' Blues" (Attic)
- 1981 "Blood Run Hot"/"Coulda Had All Your Loving" (Attic)

=== Albums ===
- 1973 Straight Up (Special)
- 1974 Dancin' (Special)
- 1975 Ready To Go (Special)
- 1977 So Far (Posterity)
- 1979 We Deliver (Attic)
- 1980 Road Fever (Attic)
- 1980 Double Header (Attic)
- 1981 Blood Run Hot (with Spencer Davis) (Attic)
- 1982 Dancin' [re-issue] (Attic)
- 1982 Straight Up [re-issue](Attic)
- 1992 Dancin'/Road Fever [double album re-issue] (Attic)
- 1997 Ready To Go [re-issue, with It's Been So Long (1987)] (Stony Plain)
- 1998 A Case Of The Blues - The Best Of Downchild (Attic)
- 2000 A Matter Of Time - The Downchild Collection (Blue Wave - US)
- 2003 Body Of Work - The Downchild Collection Volume 2 (Blue Wave - US)
- 2004 Blood Run Hot [re-issue] (Unidisc)
- 2004 Road Fever [re-issue] (Unidisc)
- 2004 We Deliver [re-issue] (Unidisc)
- 2004 Straight Up [re-issue] (Unidisc)
