= Whiskey Howl =

- Origin: Toronto, Ontario, Canada
- Genres: Blues
- Years active: 1969–1972; sporadic reunions until 1981
- Labels: Warner Bros. Pacemaker; Solid Gold
- Past members: John Witmer; Peter Boyko; Gary Penner; John ("B.J.") Bjarnason; Ron Sullivan; Wayne Wilson; Michael Pickett; Richard Fruchtman; Dave Morrison; Dave Glendenning (bass); Phil Alperson; John Tilden; Rick Birkett; Ed White; John Johnson; Simon Wallis; Dave Dunlop

Whiskey Howl was a Toronto-based Canadian blues band, most popular between 1969 and 1972. The band is notable as being one of the early Canadian bands promoting and developing blues music in Canada.

== History ==
Whiskey Howl was always a great live band, but what truly made it stand out were the undeniable abilities of the band's two lead vocalists: Pickett, one of the world's most accomplished 'harp players' and the late John Witmer, arguably one of Canada's most gifted R&B singers.

Extract from Biography of Michael Pickett; www.michaelpickett.com.

The band was subject to rapid success from the time of its formation in 1969, and an equally rapid demise, breaking up in 1972, shortly after the release of their first album.

The original band was composed of John Witmer (vocals), Peter Boyko (guitar), Gary Penner (bass), John ("B.J.") Bjarnason (harmonica) and Ron Sullivan (drums). By their second performance, they were an opening act for Led Zeppelin. They later opened for or played with such artists as the Paul Butterfield Blues Band, Johnny Winter, Big Mama Thornton, Screaming Lord Sutch, Elvin Jones, Chuck Berry, B.B. King, Bobby Blue Bland, Buddy Guy, Lonnie Johnson, and Doug Kershaw.

The band's rapid early success is exemplified by their appearance at the historic 1969 Toronto Rock and Roll Revival concert, which was headlined by The Doors and at which John Lennon's Live Peace in Toronto 1969 album was recorded. At the time, the band was less than a year old, with band members still being in their teens or early twenties.

The band's concert performance locations during their first year included the prestigious Convocation Hall, where they opened for Chuck Berry, and Massey Hall, where they opened for Bobby "Blue" Bland, Buddy Guy, and Lonnie Johnson, in the latter's last public appearance. The band then returned to Varsity Arena (indoors) for the Toronto Rock Festival, on March 26, 1970, where they shared the bill with Canned Heat, Small Faces, Amboy Dukes, The Zombies, and MC5, among others.

Band personnel at the time of recording the first album were Richard Fruchtman (bass, vocals), Wayne Wilson (drums), Dave Morrison (guitar, vocals), Michael Pickett (harmonica, vocals), and John Witmer (vocals). Witmer was a founding member and Wilson an early member of the band, in 1969; Pickett had joined in 1970, replacing original harmonica player John ("B.J.") Bjarnason, who had left the band to study to become a chiropractor. The album was produced by noted American producer and engineer Johnny Sandlin, associated with the Allman Brothers Band, among others, and featured Chuck Leavell, then of the Allman Brothers, on keyboards.

The band regrouped on occasion after 1972 and in 1981 regrouped for a recorded reunion performance at Toronto's famed El Mocambo club, resulting in their second, and final, album release. At that time, original members Witmer and Pickett were joined by John Tilden (guitar), Rick Burkett (bass), Ed White (drums), John Johnson (tenor saxophone), Simon Wallis (baritone saxophone), and Dave Dunlop (trumpet).

== Later activities ==
Band members Michael Pickett and John Witmer went on to further contributions to Canadian blues music. Vocalist Witmer became the lead singer of the Downchild Blues Band during the 1982–1986 period, as well as subsequently continuing as a professional musician until his death in 2004. Vocalist and harmonica player Pickett developed a multiple award-winning solo career.

== Discography ==
- 1972 Whiskey Howl (Warner Bros. Records; CD Release 2008, Pacemaker)
- 1981 Live At The El Mocambo (As The Whiskey Howl Big Band; CD Release 2005, re-release 2009, Solid Gold)

== See also ==
- Music of Canada
- Canadian blues
- List of bands from Canada
