= Yury Yaremenko =

Yury Vasilevich Yaremenko (Юрий Васильевич Ярёменко) (1935 August 8 -1996 September 18) was a Soviet and Russian economist, member of the Academy of Sciences (from 1994) and Director of the Institute of Economic Forecasting of the Academy. He was especially noted for his work in multisectoral (input-output) economics and for his concept of the multi-level economy, a description of how the planned economy of the Soviet Union actually worked.

== Youth and education ==
He was born in Chita in eastern Siberia, 300 miles east of Lake Baikal and 100 miles north of China. His father worked in a repair shop for railroad cars. This work would have exempted him from military service in World War II, but he chose to enlist and served in a tank crew. After the war, he was stationed in Germany for two years, where he was joined by his wife, ten-year-old Yuri, and a younger sister. After two years, they returned to the Ukraine. From there Yuri was able to enter Moscow State University in 1953. From his first year, he began to study Chinese and the economy of China. After graduation, he was sent in November 1957 to study economics at the People's University in Beijing. He graduated there in 1960 and returned to Moscow at just the moment when relations between China and the Soviet Union dramatically worsened. Despite his exceptional knowledge of Chinese institutions and language, he could find no appropriate work that used them. Nevertheless, during the rest of his life, he followed events in China closely, wrote about them, and taught courses on the economy of China at Moscow State University.

== Professional career ==
After six months as a translator for Intourist, he accepted a job in the newly organized Economic Research Institute (НИЭИ) in Gosplan. the State Planning Commission. There he came to recognize the importance of forecasting and envisioning of the future. In 1973, he and several other members of this Institute moved to the Central Economic-Mathematical Institute (ЦЭМИ) of the Academy of Sciences, where he was a deputy director and head of a laboratory. In 1985, he became a Deputy Director of the newly organized Institute of Economic Forecasting in the Academy of Sciences. Following the death in 1987 of the founding director of this Institute, A. I. Anchishkin, Yaremenko became its director and served in this capacity until his sudden death of a heart attack that began in his office.

In 1987 he was made a corresponding member of the Academy of Sciences; and in 1994, a full member. In 1990 -1991, he served on the Central Committee of the Communist Party of the Soviet Union. In the 1980s, the Five Year Plans were set in 20-year outlooks on economic, scientific and technical development which were primarily the work of Yaremenko.

His most fundamental contribution to economics was the working out of the theory of the multilevel economy. In this theory, different levels of the economy have access to resources of different quality. There had been various economic theories of socialism. Yaremenko's work, however, was unique in describing theoretically and analytically how it actually worked in the Soviet Union.

Yaremenko was one of the principal economic advisers to Mikhail Gorbachev, last president of the USSR. Yaremenko warned that simply discontinuing central planning and opening the country to foreign trade would lead to collapse of consumer goods sectors which could not compete with imports. Rather, the system of priorities should first be used to transform the economy's structure to something approximating that of market economy. This advice was not heeded, and the consequences were much as he had anticipated. In the 1990s, he was sharply critical of the policies adopted by the Russian government. He was not at all opposed to an orderly transition to a market economy but felt that the “shock therapy” approach was needlessly costly.

Throughout his professional career, he was much concerned with sources of information on the economy. On weekends, he often went to the Lenin library to see what the technical journals had to offer about the economic situation in various industries. In the 1990s, he engaged a sociologist, S. A. Belonovskiï, to interview plant managers around the country. In 1993 and again in 1995, Belonovskiï interviewed Yaremenko. After his death, these interviews were edited by Belonovskiï and G. A. Yaremenko into a book, Economic Conversations, which appeared in 1998. They afford a unique and altogether remarkable commentary on the dramatic events in the Russian economy during the first half of the 1990s.

In October 2015, the year of the 80th anniversary of Yaremenko's birth, the Economic Forecasting Institute of the Academy of Sciences held a three-day conference to honor his memory. The first day was devoted to analysis of the current economic situation; the second, to economic modeling; and the third, to studies on the economy of China. For this occasion, the Institute issued a one-volume collection of Yaremenko's most important works.
