= Michael Pickett (musician) =

Canadian musician

- Origin: Canada
- Genres: Blues; roots
- Occupations: Singer, instrumentalist
- Instruments: Guitar, harmonica

Michael Pickett is a Canadian blues and roots singer, guitarist and harmonica player.

== Career ==
Michael Pickett was born in Toronto on September 19, 1950. Pickett commenced his music career as a member of Whiskey Howl, a seminal Canadian blues band, based in Toronto, Ontario. After the breakup of Whiskey Howl in the early 1970s, Pickett continued his career as the lead singer and harmonica player for blues band Wooden Teeth, of which he was a co-founder. As of the late 1970s, Pickett developed a career in his own name, with both the Michael Pickett Band and as a solo artist. Among other awards, he is the recipient of several Maple Blues Awards, honouring his contributions to blues music. Now he plays occasionally and hosts his Concert For Peace event at his home in Crystal Beach, Ontario each September.

== Discography ==
=== Whiskey Howl ===
- 1972 Whiskey Howl (Warner Bros. Records; CD Release 2008, Pacemaker)
- 1981 Live at The El Mocambo (As The Whiskey Howl Big Band; CD Release 2005, re-release 2009, Solid Gold)

=== The Michael Pickett Band ===
- 1998 Blues Money
- 2000 Conversation with the Blues

=== Solo ===
- 2003 Solo
- 2004 Live at Winterfolk

=== Compilation albums ===
- 2006 Saturday Night Blues: 20 Years (CBC)

=== As sideman ===
With Bo Diddley

- Big Bad Bo (Chess, 1974)
