= Downchild Blues Band =

Canadian blues band

The Downchild Blues Band
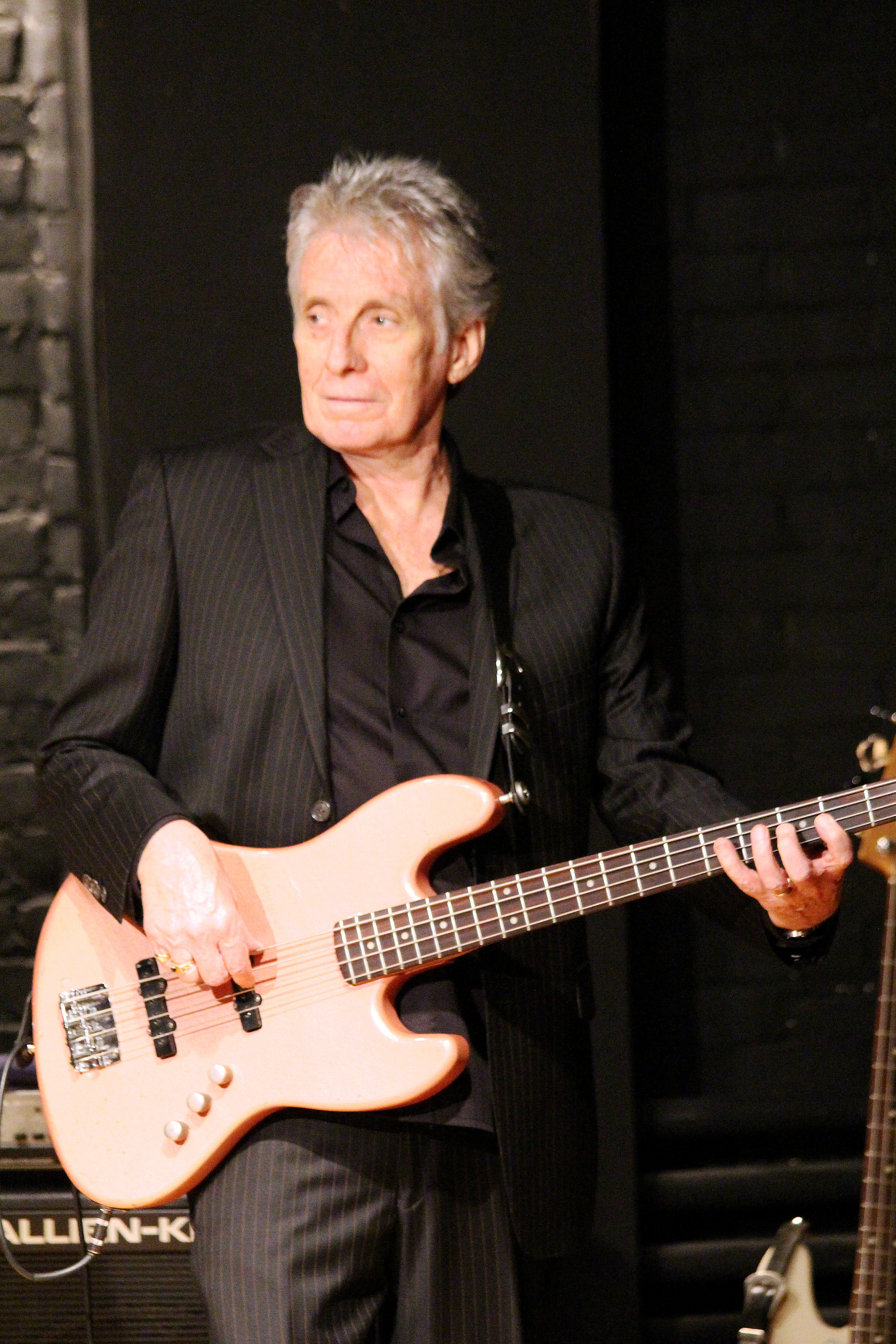
- Gary Kendall - bassist of the Downchild Blues Band.

Background information
- Origin: Toronto, Ontario, Canada
- Genre: Blues
- Years active: 1969–present
- Label: True North Records
- Members: Donnie Walsh; Chuck Jackson; Pat Carey; Gary Kendall; Tyler Yarema; Jim Casson
- Past members: Robert "Bob" Fitzgerald; Richard "Hock" Walsh; Dave Woodward; Ron Jacobs; Vic Wilson; Cash Wall; John Tanti; Jim Milne; Malccolm Mccaig; Jane Vasey; Michael O'Connell; Wayne Wilson; Tony Flaim; John Witmer; Billy Bryans; Kenny Neal; Wayne Jackson; Phil Alperson; Frank Russell; Tony Rodolone; Paul Nixon; Craig Kaleal; Larry Bodner; Nat Abraham; James Warburton; Vic Wilson; Richard Whitehouse; Gene Taylor; Sonnie Bernardi; Ray Harrison; Bob Heslin; Marty Vickers; Mike Skinner; Pete Macnamara; Pat Rush; Dennis Pinhorn; Marty Vickers; Gary Latimer; Tyler Burgess; Doran Katz; Mike McKenna; Craig Kaleal; Bill Brennan; Michael Fonfara; Mike Fitzpatrick
- Website: Downchild.com

The Downchild Blues Band is a Canadian blues band, described by one reviewer as "the premier blues band in Canada". The Blues Brothers band was heavily influenced by the Downchild Blues Band.

== History ==
=== Early history: 1969–1982 ===
The Downchild Blues Band was formed in Toronto in 1969 and continues to perform today. It was co-founded by two brothers, Donnie "Mr. Downchild" Walsh and Richard "Hock" Walsh. The band's international fame is partially due to three of its songs, the originals "I've Got Everything I Need (Almost)" and "Shot Gun Blues", and its adaptation of "Flip, Flop and Fly", all from its 1973 album, Straight Up, being featured on the first Blues Brothers album, Briefcase Full of Blues (1978). "Flip, Flop and Fly" has been Downchild's only hit single, and became the signature song of Hock Walsh. The band's musical style is described as being "a spirited, if fundamental, brand of jump-band and Chicago-style blues".

The band name came from the Sonny Boy Williamson II song, "Mr. Downchild". The initial band membership was Donnie "Mr. Downchild" Walsh, who remains the sole constant band member, with younger brother Rick "Hock" Walsh on vocals, accompanied by Dave Woodward, Cash Wall, John Tanti, and Jim Milne. They were the house band at the fabled Grossman's Tavern from 1968 to 1970, managed briefly by former folk musician, Ron Gerston. Classically trained pianist Jane Vasey joined the band in 1973.

The initial blues musical influence on Donnie Walsh was Jimmy Reed. He was later greatly influenced by James Cotton, both in terms of musical style and band format. Walsh and Cotton later became personal friends. Donnie Walsh described these early influences as follows:

Jimmy Reed. I heard him on my girlfriend's birthday party. Some guys brought a Jimmy Reed album over and that was it, for me. ...I'd put him on the record player, and when I went to sleep at night, it would still be playing when I'd get up in the morning. Then I'd play him all day, and it was unreal. Then, of course, I spread out to Sonny Boy Williamson, Little Walter, Muddy Waters, B.B. King, and Albert King. Then, I got a job in a record store. A blues record store that stocked 45s only. All alphabetical all around the whole room. You'd go to the Muddy Waters section, and there would be eight Muddy Water singles. You'd go to the Sonny Boy Williamson section, and there would be five Sonny Boy Williamson singles.

The band's first album, Bootleg, is regarded as one of the first independent albums ever produced in Canada. It was recorded over two nights in 1971, in a makeshift studio at Toronto's Rochdale College. Donnie Walsh and others distributed the album by hand. It was welcomed by major Toronto music retailer Sam Sniderman, of Sam The Record Man renown, who was very much disposed to promoting Canadian music. The record was soon acquired by RCA Records Canada for more general distribution.

According to Donnie Walsh, more than 120 musicians have been associated with Downchild since its 1969 founding. The band has never lost its focus on blues music. While certain band members have left to pursue what was perceived to be a more lucrative rock music career, Donnie Walsh has a different perspective:

Just around when I started there were all these guys in blues bands and of course they were impatient and they wanted to make some more money so they became rock bands. I played the blues then and I play the blues now. That's what I love. ... It's a living thing, it's living music. By living and breathing it goes on and what that means is that instead of being the same kind of music somebody else wrote years ago, it lives and evolves. Blues is serious stuff, it's a heavy kind of music in your soul. You show up with the blues I play, you lighten up. That's what it's all about. It's like medicine.

=== 1982–1990: Vasey, Hock and Flaim Gone ===
In 1982, the band suffered a major setback with the untimely death of keyboard player Jane Vasey, who succumbed to leukemia at the age of thirty-two. Donnie Walsh, who was living with Vasey at the time, took a period of time off to reflect on his future and that of the band. The band came back in the fall of 1982, with both a new singer and a new keyboard player, by way of a live recording from Toronto's historic El Mocambo club, But I'm On The Guest List.

Despite being closely identified with the band's initial sound and also being the co-writer, with brother Donnie Walsh, of "Shot Gun Blues", later recorded by the Blues Brothers, Hock Walsh would leave, rejoin and be replaced as lead singer in the band on several occasions. He was first fired from the band in 1974, shortly before work began on the band's third album, Dancing. At that time, he was replaced by Tony Flaim. Hock rejoined the band in 1977 and 1985. He was fired by his brother Donnie for a final time in 1990 and replaced by Chuck Jackson. Chuck Jackson has remained the lead singer of Downchild since that time.

Notwithstanding their strained relationship, Donnie Walsh assessed his brother's ability as follows: "He was a fabulous singer; he could sing the blues better than anybody I've ever heard. He had the timing, the phrasing, a fabulous voice… he was just great." Hock Walsh died on December 31, 1999, at the age of 51, of an apparent heart attack. Performing on his own and with his own bands since 1990, he had been scheduled to perform a New Year's Eve concert with blues singer Rita Chiarelli. His last recordings were three tracks on 4 Blues, the 1998 debut album of Toronto's Big Daddy G Review.

Tony Flaim, the initial replacement for Hock Walsh in Downchild and featured on six of the band's albums, also died of a heart attack, on March 10, 2000, less than three months after Hock Walsh. He was 52. Flaim's near nine-year association with Downchild covered most of the 1975 to 1982 period, including a period when Hock Walsh rejoined the band in 1977, plus 1986 to 1988. He was succeeded by a returning Hock Walsh, who was fired by his brother for a final time in 1990. During the 1982–1986 period, Flaim was replaced by John Witmer, former lead singer of the well-respected Toronto blues band Whiskey Howl, while Hock Walsh rejoined the band for a brief period in 1985. One of Tony Flaim's last public performances was at a tribute to the late Hock Walsh, in February 2000, at Toronto's Horseshoe Tavern.

=== 1990–2022 ===
Most of the current lineup has been together since 1990, when Chuck Jackson (vocals) and Michael Fonfara (keyboards) joined Donnie Walsh (guitar and harmonica) and Pat Carey (sax). Sax player Pat Carey was the first to join the current Downchild lineup, in 1985, a year after arriving in Toronto and commencing his Toronto musical career playing with both Hock Walsh and Tony Flaim. Bass player Gary Kendall joined Downchild for a second time in 1995, after first playing with the band during the 1979–1983 period. They were later joined by drummer Mike Fitzpatrick, who first recorded with the band on the Come On In album (2004).

Later accolades include winning a Juno Award for "Blues Album of the Year" in 2014 for "Can You Hear The Music", Downchild's 17th album; a nomination for "Blues Album of The Year" in 2005, plus winning the Maple Blues Award as "Entertainers of The Year" in both 2005 and 2006. In addition, the band's connection to The Blues Brothers has continued. In 2005, when Dan Aykroyd and James Belushi toured as The Blues Brothers, Donnie Walsh joined them onstage at Ontario's Casino Rama. Donnie Walsh's song, "I've Got Everything I Need (Almost)" was selected in 2007 as one of 125 "essential" Canadian songs, and the only blues song on the list.

Michael Fonfara died on 8 January 2021 in a Toronto hospital, following a two-year battle with cancer. Shortly after, drummer Mike Fitzpatrick retired. Later that summer, Downchild embarked on a 50th anniversary tour, long delayed due to the COVID-19 pandemic, joined by returning drummer Jim Casson (who played with the group 1996–2001) and Toronto keyboardist Tyler Yarema.

== Legacy ==
In his book More Blues Singers: Biographies of 50 Artist from the Later 20th Century, David Dicaire wrote:

(Donnie) Walsh has been called the "father of Canadian blues" and with good reason. He is a blues pioneer on the Canadian scene. It was Walsh who paid the highest dues so that later Canadian blues acts, such as the Jeff Healey Band, the Colin James Band, the Powder Blues, Sue Foley, The Sidemen and The Highliners could also enjoy their success. The Canadian blues scene, which has blossomed nicely in the last few years, was relatively barren in the late 1960s when The Downchild Blues Band first started out.

== Awards ==
=== Band ===
- 1981 JUNO Award, Best Album Graphics (We Deliver)
- 1992 Canadian Broadcasting Corporation, Great Canadian Blues Award
- 2005 Maple Blues Award, Recording of the Year (Come On In)
- 2005 Maple Blues Award, Electric Act of The Year
- 2005 Maple Blues Award, Entertainers of The Year
- 2006 Maple Blues Award, Entertainers of The Year
- 2014 JUNO Award, Blues Album of the Year (Can You Hear the Music)
- 2018 JUNO Nomination, Blues Album of the Year (Something I've Done)

=== Members ===
==== Donnie Walsh ====
- 1990 Blues With a Feeling Award, Toronto Blues Society, honouring distinguished career
- 2010 The Canadian Blues Museum Hall of Fame Induction 'Mr. Downchild" June 20, 2010

==== Chuck Jackson ====
- 1999 Maple Blues Award, Male Vocalist of The Year
- 2002 Blues With a Feeling Award, Toronto Blues Society, honouring distinguished career
- 2007 Maple Blues Award, Male Vocalist of The Year

==== Pat Carey ====
- 1999 Maple Blues Award, Horn Player of The Year
- 2000 Maple Blues Award, Horn Player of The Year
- 2001 Maple Blues Award, Horn Player of The Year
- 2002 Maple Blues Award, Horn Player of The Year
- 2004 Maple Blues Award, Horn Player of The Year
- 2007 Maple Blues Award, Horn Player of The Year

==== Gary Kendall ====
- 1993 Blues With a Feeling Award, Toronto Blues Society, honouring distinguished career
- 1997 Maple Blues Award, Bassist of The Year
- 1999 Maple Blues Award, Bassist of The Year
- 2000 Maple Blues Award, Bassist of The Year
- 2002 Maple Blues Award, Bassist of The Year
- 2002 Thunder Blues Award, Thunder Bay Blues Society
- 2002 Keeping The Blues Alive Award, Thunder Bay Blues Society
- 2005 Maple Blues Award, Bassist of The Year
- 2007 Maple Blues Award, Bassist of The Year
- 2012 Maple Blues Award, Bassist of The Year
- 2013 Maple Blues Award, Bassist of The Year

==== Michael Fonfara ====
- 2000 Maple Blues Award, Piano/Keyboard Player of The Year
- 2004 Maple Blues Award, Piano/Keyboard Player of The Year
- 2007 Maple Blues Award, Piano/Keyboard Player of The Year
- 2009 Maple Blues Award, Piano/Keyboard Player of The Year

==== Mike Fitzpatrick ====
- 2005 Maple Blues Award, Drummer of The Year
- 2007 Maple Blues Award, Drummer of The Year

== Discography ==
The list is based on the Canadian Pop Encyclopedia, with subsequent additions and amendments.

=== Singles ===
- 1973 "Flip, Flop and Fly" (#35 Can.)
- 1974 "Flip, Flop and Fly" [re-issue] (Special) (#82 Can.)
- 1974 "I've Got Everything I Need (Almost)"
- 1974 "Tell Your Mother" (Special) (#54 Can.)
- 1975 "Goin' Dancin"
- 1976 "Old Ma Belle" (#67 Can.)
- 1980 "I've Been A Fool" (Attic)
- 1980 "Tryin' to Keep Her 88's Straight"/"Oh Oh" (Attic) (#71 Can.)
- 1981 "Hey Hey Little Girl"/"Drivin' Blues" (Attic)
- 1981 "Blood Run Hot"/"Coulda Had All Your Loving" (Attic)

=== Albums ===
- 1971 Bootleg (Special) (#62 Can. May 13, 1972)
- 1973 Straight Up (Special) (#66 Can. January 12, 1974)
- 1974 Dancing (Special) (#50 Can. December 21, 1974)
- 1975 Ready To Go (Special)
- 1976 Bootleg [re-issue] (RCA Victor)
- 1977 So Far (Posterity)
- 1979 We Deliver (Attic) (#74 Can. May 24, 1980)
- 1980 Bootleg [re-issue] (RCA); also later re-issue by Downchild Music
- 1980 Road Fever (Attic)
- 1980 Double Header (Attic) (double album reissue of Straight Up and We Deliver)
- 1981 Blood Run Hot (with Spencer Davis) (Attic)
- 1982 Dancing [re-issue] (Attic)
- 1982 Straight Up [re-issue](Attic)
- 1982 But I'm On The Guest List (Attic)
- 1987 It's Been So Long (Stony Plain/BMG)
- 1988 We Deliver/Straight Up [double album re-issue] (Attic)
- 1989 Gone Fishing (Stony Plain/WEA)
- 1992 Dancing/Road Fever [double album re-issue] (Attic)
- 1994 Good Times Guaranteed (Downchild Music)
- 1997 Lucky 13 (Downchild Music)
- 1997 It's Been So Long/Ready To Go [double album re-issue] (Stony Plain)
- 1998 A Case Of The Blues - The Best Of Downchild (Attic)
- 2000 A Matter Of Time - The Downchild Collection (Blue Wave - US)
- 2003 Body Of Work - The Downchild Collection Volume 2 (Blue Wave - US)
- 2004 But I'm On The Guest List [re-issue] (Unidisc)
- 2004 Blood Run Hot [re-issue] (Unidisc)
- 2004 Road Fever [re-issue] (Unidisc)
- 2004 We Deliver [re-issue] (Unidisc)
- 2004 Straight Up [re-issue] (Unidisc)
- 2004 Come On In (Downchild Music) with Gene Taylor, winner at the 2005 Maple Blues Awards
- 2007 Live At The Palais Royale (Downchild Music)
- 2009 I Need A Hat (True North Records)
- 2013 Can You Hear The Music (True North Records)
- 2017 Something I've Done (True North Records)
- 2019 Live At The Toronto Jazz Festival (Diesel Entertainment)
