= El Mocambo =

Live music and entertainment venue in Toronto, Canada

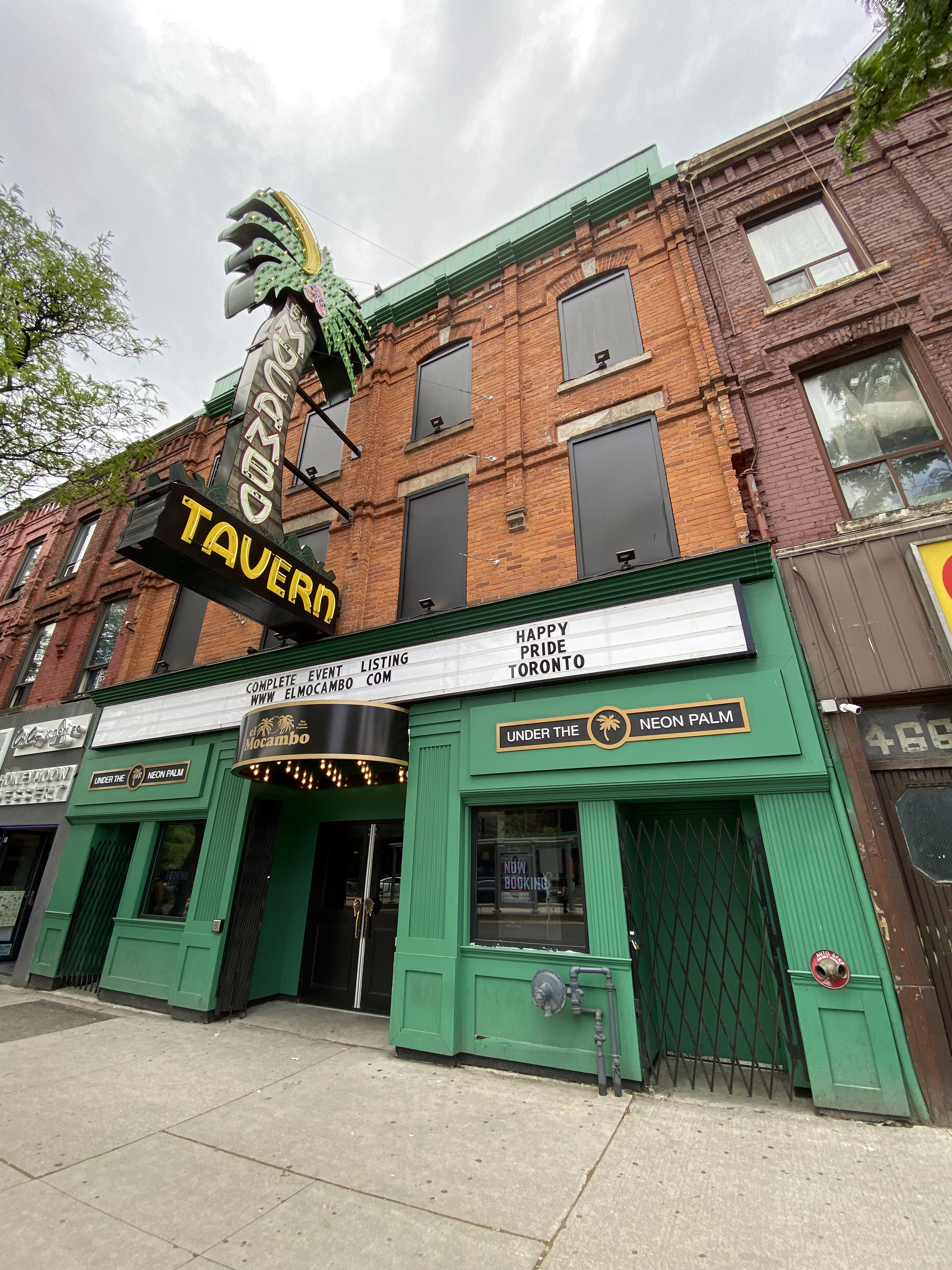
- Exterior view in 2023
- Interactive map of El Mocambo
- Location: 464 Spadina Avenue; Toronto, Ontario, Canada
- Coordinates: 43.657487°N 79.400177°W
- Capacity: 650
- Type: Music venue

Construction
- Built: 1910 (building)
- Opened: 1948 (as El Mocambo)
- Renovated: 2015–2020

Website
- elmocambo.com

El Mocambo is a live music and entertainment venue in Toronto, Ontario, Canada. Located on Spadina Avenue, just south of College Street, the venue has played an important role in the development of popular music in Toronto since 1948. It is best known for the 1977 surprise show by The Rolling Stones, which became nationally notorious for the presence of then Prime Minister Pierre Trudeau's wife, Margaret Trudeau, who was partying with the Stones.

== History ==
=== Early years ===
Apocryphally, the original building at 462 Spadina had been a music venue since 1850 and was first used as a haven for escaped slaves. The current building was built in 1910 and housed a dry goods store, a barbershop, and restaurants in its first three decades.

With the passage of the Liquor Licence Act of 1946, which allowed the sale of liquor in taverns and restaurants in the province for the first time since World War I, restaurateurs Joseph Brown and John Lang decided to apply for one of Toronto's first liquor licences and convert their property at 464 Spadina into one of the city's first cocktail bars. The establishment's name and iconic neon palm sign were inspired by a San Francisco nightclub. In the club's original incarnation, which officially opened on March 23, 1948, the main floor was converted into a dining hall with a dance floor on the second floor that featured Latin music. Live music was not permitted until July 1948, when the Liquor Licence Board of Ontario reversed an earlier ban.

In later configurations of the establishment, musical acts appeared on separate stages located on the main and second floor of the building. By the 1960s, Adam Schuy owned the venue which, by then, featured music appealing to Toronto's Hungarian, Irish, and Portuguese communities. A German dance club, Deutsches Tanz Lokal, frequently rented the second floor during this period. By the time Schuy died in 1971, striptease was being featured on the main floor.

The business and building were bought in 1972 by Michael Baird and restaurateur Tom Kristenbrun, who also owned the Jarvis House. Under the pair's ownership, "El Mo" became a youth-oriented blues and rock music venue. It brought bands like Downchild Blues Band (which became the club's house band), as well as Buddy Guy, Muddy Waters, and many others "up the street" and paid them a regular fee to perform. During the early 1970s, the upstairs featured mostly "retreads" and "has-been" acts, with the occasional group on the rise. Most of the time, drink sales determined which bands would return. The bands would start out downstairs and if the revenue they generated increased, they would sometimes graduate to upstairs. Up and coming performers such as Tom Waits, U2 and Elvis Costello performed at the El Mo in the 1970s.

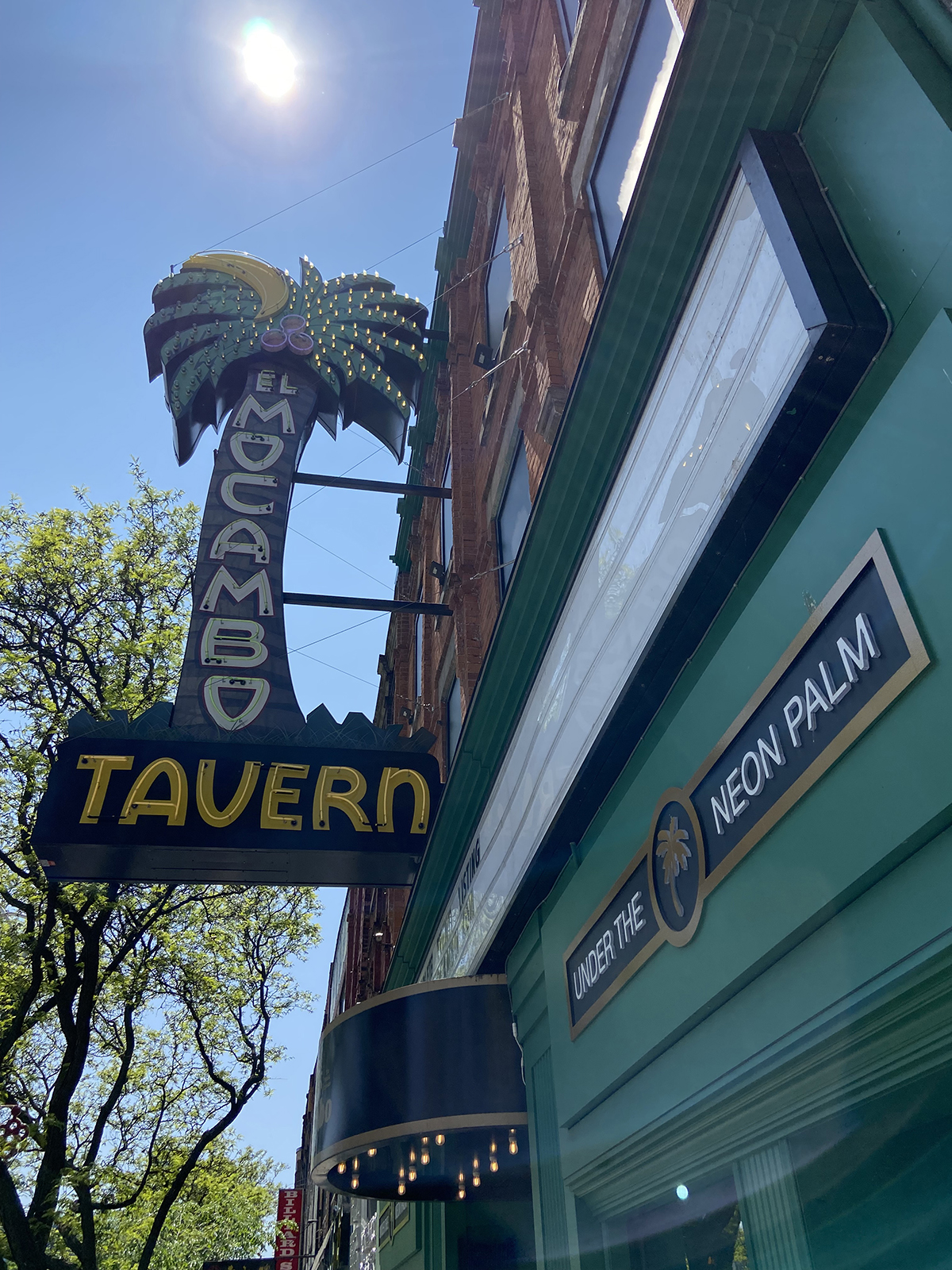
El Mocambo's iconic sign

Located within walking distance of the University of Toronto, Toronto Metropolitan University, and George Brown College (which was housed in Kensington Market at the time), the venue became a popular place for students living nearby. Throughout the 1970s, the club was known as a bastion of the blues and rock and roll during a time better known for disco. It was considered "infamous" due to a 1977 surprise performance by The Rolling Stones posing as "The Cockroaches," an opening act for April Wine, after which Margaret Trudeau, wife of then-Prime Minister of Canada Pierre Trudeau, was rumoured to have had a romantic encounter with Mick Jagger. The incident made international headlines and was a factor in the Trudeau's eventual divorce. The performance was featured on the Stones' Love You Live concert album. In its heyday, the venue also hosted performances by Blondie, the Ramones, Devo, Joan Jett, and Stevie Ray Vaughan.

Changes in the record industry's touring practices, a failure to update the venue, and a deal with Concert Productions International (which prevented other promoters from booking the club) saw fewer international acts performing at El Mo, which increasingly booked local acts instead. Baird and Kristenbrun sold the club in 1986, initiating a long period of frequent ownership changes and decline, including it being padlocked twice in 1989 and brief closures in 1991 and 2001. Herbert Becker and John Paolucci owned and ran the club from 1986 until it closed in 1989. The two had purchased the business, the name and logo from Michael Baird and Tom Kristenbrun.

The club was a mainstay of the 1990s underground music scene. Dan Burke became the club's booker in 1998 and made it into a venue for garage rock acts and international bands such as White Stripes and Zoobombs. A monthly queer rock ’n’ roll party called Vazaleen, organized by Will Munro, became a regular feature and helped launch Peaches on what became an international career.

=== Recent years ===
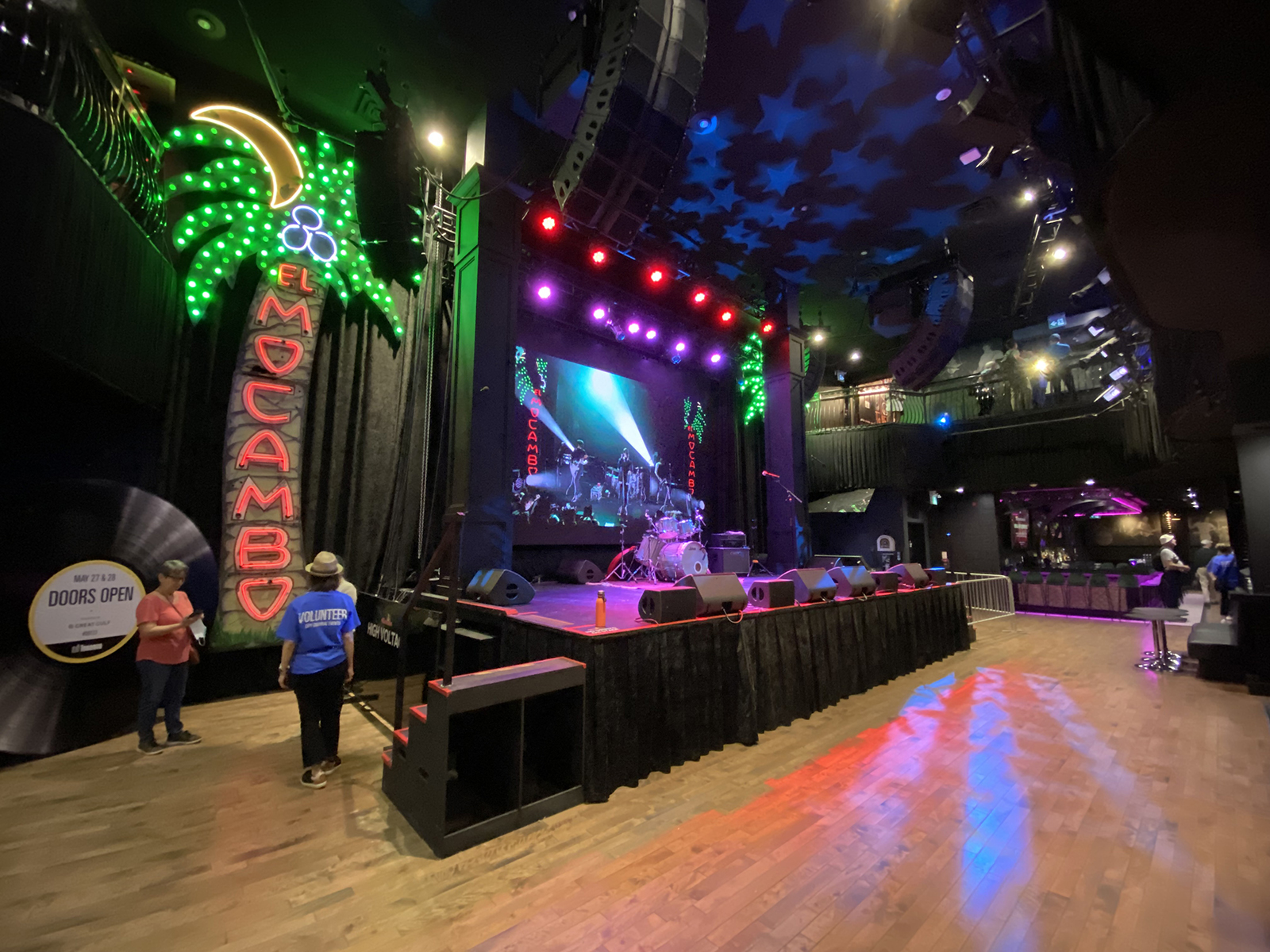
Music stage in Level 3

In 2001, El Mocambo was bought by Abbas Jahangiri, who renovated both floors and tried to turn the upstairs into a dance studio. The club was in this period a venue to all genres of music, from rock and roll and orchestra to heavy metal, reggae, hip hop and jazz.

Jahangiri became a missionary and used the club to host numerous charity events, with fundraisers for War Child, Amnesty International, Free the Children, World Vision, Blank-Fest and others. In 2012, he sold El Mocambo in order to focus on his missionary work. The new owners had difficulty in booking the venue and put it up for sale in the fall of 2014.

The club was expected to close after a last show on November 6, 2014. However, on the eve of its impending closure, it was announced that the club had been purchased for $3.8 million by Michael Wekerle, who arranged to renovate it and maintain it as a live music venue.

Currently, El Mo is open and operational after its $30 million renovations to two stages, several different bars, a recording studio, private rooms, and dance floors. Wood removed from the stage and rafters of El Mocambo during its renovation was sent to the Fender Custom Shop in Corona, California, with which they made a limited series of Fender Stratocaster guitar bodies.

Wekerle defaulted on $55.6 million in loans tied to the venue. In 2025, the venue was put up for sale again, with operations continuing normally.

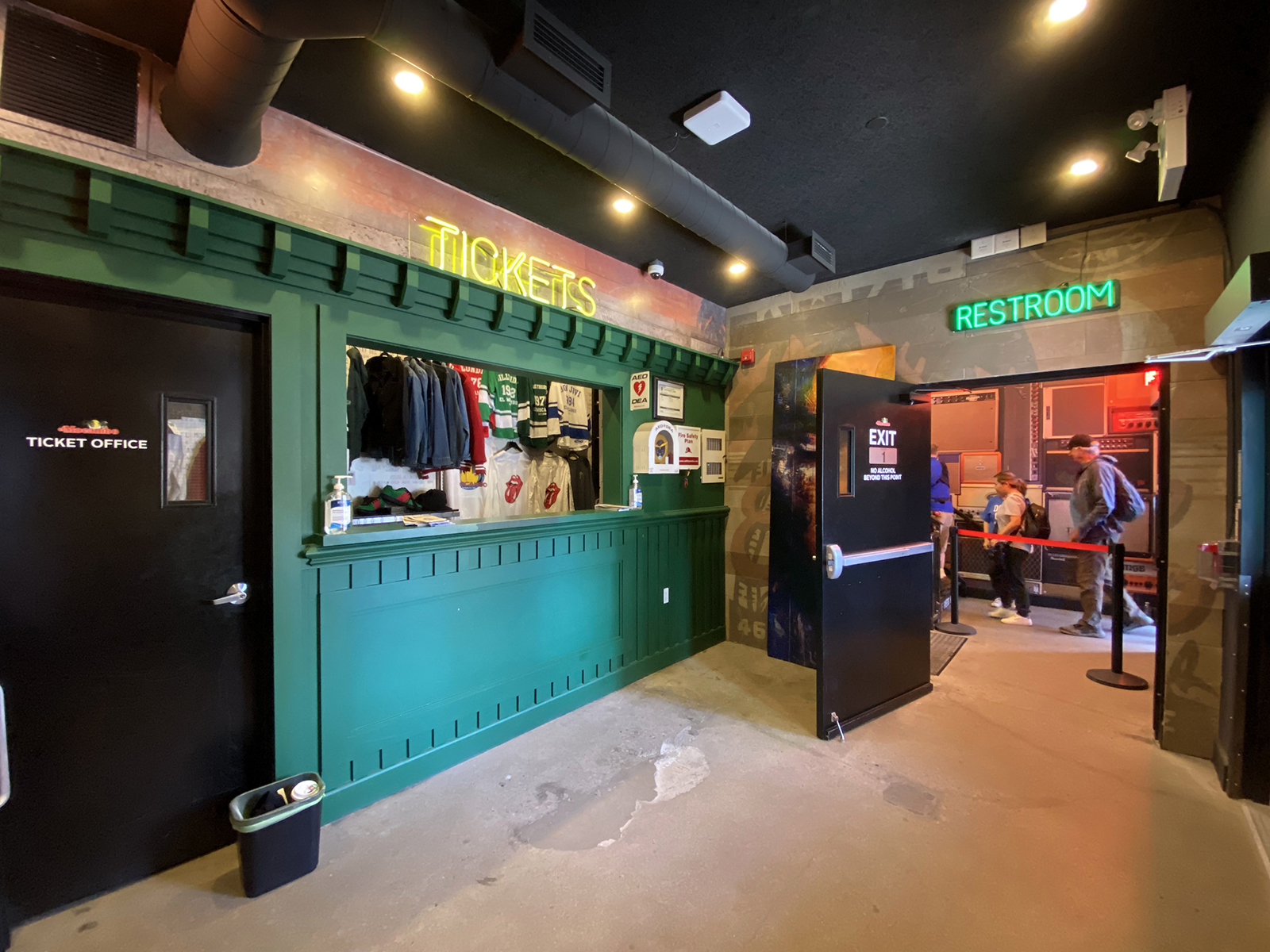
Ticket office

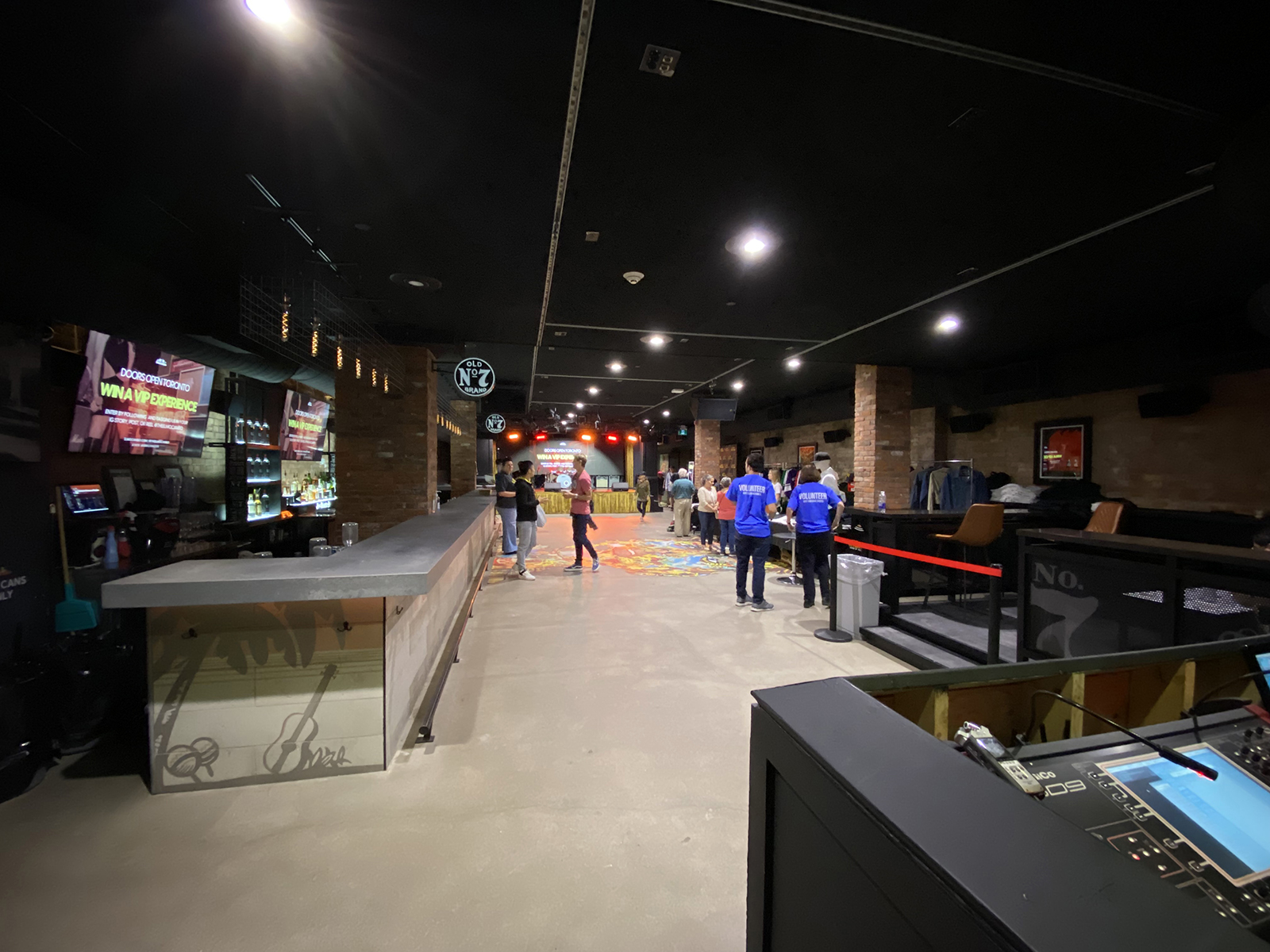
Event space at Level 1

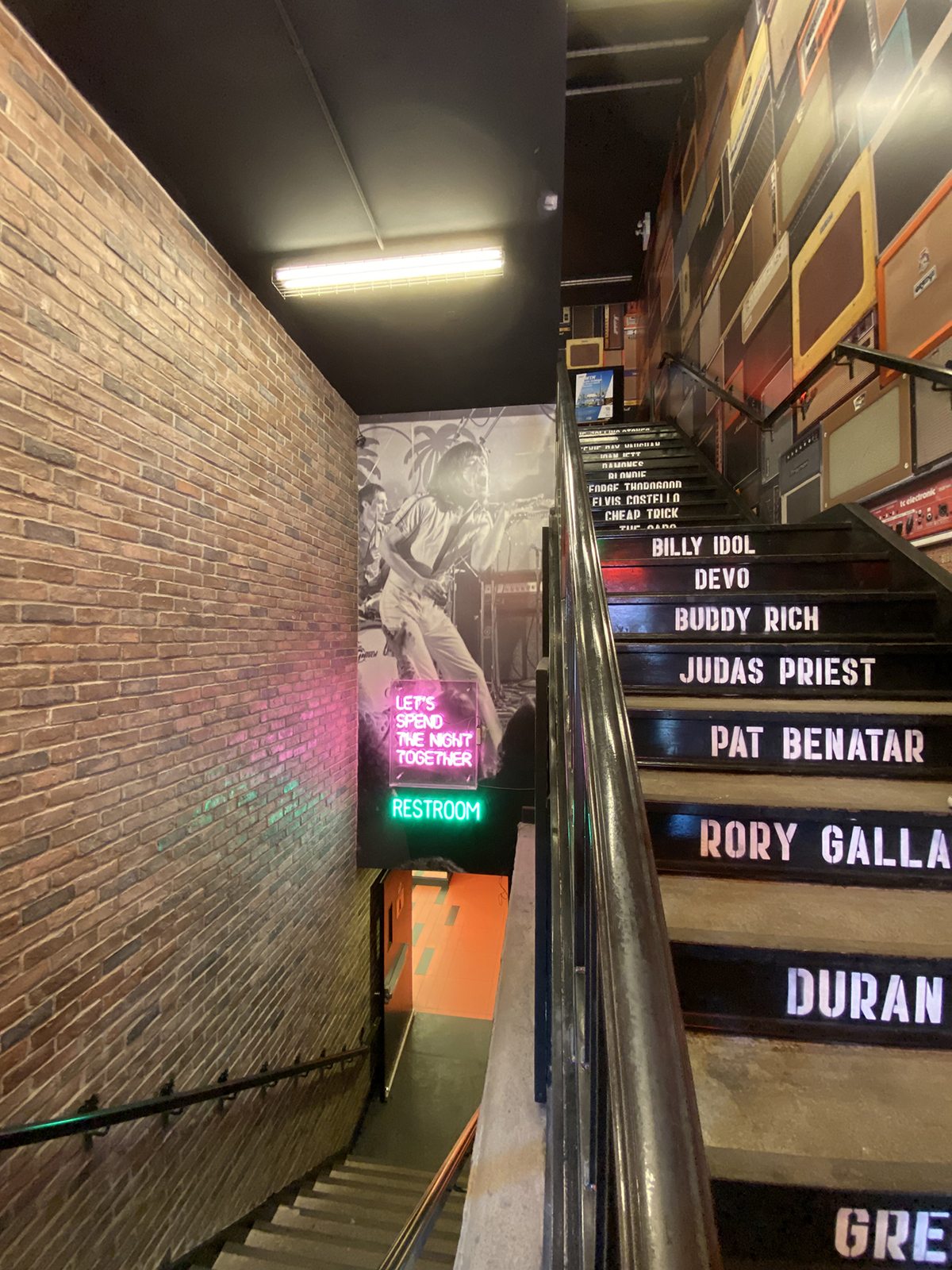
Stairs

== Major acts ==
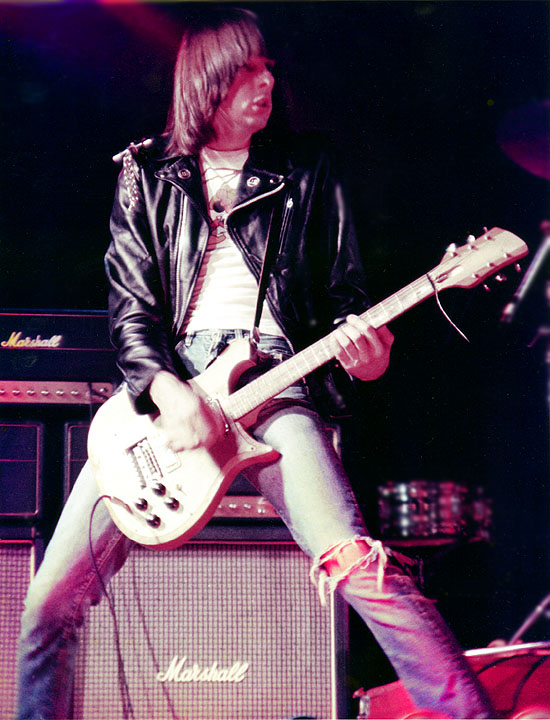
Johnny Ramone of The Ramones performing at El Mocambo in 1977

Over the years, other major pop music acts appeared at the venue, including Marilyn Monroe and Dan Schafer also internationally famous jazz performers, including Grover Washington Jr., Charles Mingus, and Al Di Meola, and rock acts such as U2, Switchfoot, Moxy, Elvis Costello, The Ramones, John Cougar Mellencamp, Duran Duran, Dream Theater, The Rolling Stones, Stevie Ray Vaughan and Double Trouble, April Wine, Eek A Mouse, Durutti Column, Snakefinger, Bo Diddley, Tom Cochrane and Red Rider, Blondie, The Cars, Meat Loaf, Jimi Hendrix, Half Japanese, Queens of the Stone Age, Bon Jovi, Teenage Head, Sum 41, Shakin' Natives, Etta Royal and Congress Court.

On March 4, 1977, looking for an unprepossessing venue to record in, The Rolling Stones played the first of two performances at the club (the second one occurring on March 5, 1977), billing themselves pseudonymously as "The Cockroaches." It was their first live club date in 14 years. Their opening act was Canadian rockers April Wine of Montreal. The Stones show was recorded and released as one side (Side 3) of the double album Love You Live, which reached No. 3 in the UK, #5 in the US. April Wine took advantage of the high-tech remote recording equipment brought by the Stones to record their own show for a live album as well. A standalone live album of these Stones performances, entitled El Mocambo 1977, was released in 2022.

On May 9, 2008, the acclaimed American hard-rock band Queens of the Stone Age had a surprise concert at El Mocambo as part of their Canadian tour.

== Live recordings ==
Live recordings made by other bands/performers at the venue include:

- Big Walter Horton — Live at the El Mocambo (1973)
- The Amboy Dukes — (1973)
- Starz — Live at the El Mocambo (1973)
- April Wine — Live at the El Mocambo (1977)
- Rolling Stones — Love You Live (1977), El Mocambo 1977 (2022) (incl. complete second show + 3 tracks from the first show as bonus tracks)
- Elvis Costello — Live at the El Mocambo (1978)
- The Cars — 14th September 1978 El Mocambo Toronto
- MacLean & MacLean — MacLean & MacLean Suck Their Way to the Top (1980)
- The Whiskey Howl Big Band — Live at the El Mocambo (1981)
- Downchild Blues Band — But I'm On The Guest List (1982)
- Stevie Ray Vaughan & Double Trouble — Live at the El Mocambo (1983)
- Sheriff — Live at El Mocambo (1983)
- Rollins Band — Live Split Album with Dutch band Gore (1987)
- Moxy — Raw (2001)
- Zoobombs — Bomb You Live (2001)
- Mainline — Last Show @ The Elmo (2001)
- The Sinisters — Live (2003)
- Toronto Police Pipe Band — Live at the El Mocambo (2010)
- Silverstein — Decade (Live at the El Mocambo) (2010)
- Andre Pettipas and The Giants — Live at The El Mocambo (2022)
- Wang Chung Live at The El Mocambo (2024)

== See also ==
- Mocambo (nightclub)
- Mocambo (restaurant)
