= Walter Zwolinski =

Canadian musician

- Born: Walter Zwolinski; 1 January 1946 (age 80); Toronto, Ontario, Canada
- Genres: Rock; pop
- Occupations: Singer; songwriter; musician
- Instruments: Vocals, Keyboards
- Years active: 1968–present
- Labels: EMI America; A&M
- Formerly of: Brutus (Canadian band)

Walter "Zwol" Zwolinski (aka Zwol or Walter Zwol; born 1 January 1946) is a Canadian musician and songwriter and founding member and front-man for the Canadian rock band Brutus (1969–1976). The band charted a minor Canadian hit, "Who Wants To Buy A Song", a #65 hit in 1976. Zwol then embarked on a solo career and charted two minor Top 100 hits in the US and Canada late 1970s. He continues to record and perform live in the Toronto region.

== Brutus ==
Formed in 1969, Brutus consisted of Zwol as vocalist, Tom Wilson as bassist, Michael Magann on trumpet, Lance Wright on drums, Eldon "Sonny" Wingay on guitar, and Bill Robb on sax and trombone. The band was the opening act for popular Canadian and American acts that were touring Canada.

The group disbanded in 1971, then reformed with a revised line-up and new look in 1973. The new Brutus lineup recorded two singles on GRT Records in 1975, with "Who Wants To Buy A Song" and "Ooh Mama Mama" becoming their most successful recordings. Their debut album would follow in 1976 but only two additional singles would follow before they disbanded.

== Solo career ==
Zwol would sign with EMI-America in the late 1970s and record two albums: the self-titled Zwol in 1978 and Effective Immediately in 1979. From the self-titled album, two singles would make the American Top 100 chart: "Call Out my Name", about love fading away, reached #75 US and #90 Canada, and "New York City", a new wave synth ode to the Big Apple, reached #76 US and #57 Canada.

Band members on Effective Immediately included Bernie LaBarge on guitar and vocals, Grant Slater on keyboards and vocals, Sonnie Bernardi on drums, and Dennis Pinhorn on bass guitar and vocals.

In 1981, Zwol signed a record deal with A&M for his new band "Walter Zwol and The Rage". They released one album titled Thrillz but no singles would chart. Band members included Bernie LaBarge on guitar and vocals, Grant Slater on keyboards and vocals, Paul Armstrong on drums, and Dennis Pinhorn on bass guitar and vocals.

== Singles ==
Year	Song	CAN	US	NL
1978	"New York City"	57	76	-
1979	"Call Out My Name"	90	75	-
1979	"Southern Part of France"	-	-	61
1979	"Shaka Shaka"	96	-	-
