= Richard "Hock" Walsh =

Canadian singer and songwriter

- Born: Richard Walsh; December 19, 1948
- Died: December 31, 1999 (aged 51)
- Genres: Blues
- Occupations: Singer, songwriter
- Years active: 1969–1999

Richard "Hock" Walsh (December 19, 1948 – December 31, 1999) was one of the first professional blues singers in Canada. He is particularly notable as the co-founder of the Downchild Blues Band and was the original singer of that band's best-known songs.

== Biography ==
With his older brother Donnie ("Mr. Downchild") Walsh, Richard "Hock" Walsh co-founded the Downchild Blues Band in 1969, in Toronto. At the time, Downchild, as it later came to be known, was one of very few Canadian bands devoted to playing and developing blues music in Canada.

Both Donnie and Hock Walsh were greatly popularized by comedian Dan Aykroyd, who developed the Blues Brothers based on what he had seen in the Walsh brothers. Aykroyd modeled Elwood Blues on Donnie Walsh, while John Belushi's Jake Blues character was modeled on Hock Walsh and Curtis Salgado. In their first album as the Blues Brothers, Briefcase Full of Blues (1978), Aykroyd and Belushi featured three well-known Downchild songs closely associated with Hock Walsh's vocal style: "I've Got Everything I Need (Almost)", written by Donnie Walsh, "Shotgun Blues", co-written by Donnie and Hock Walsh, and "Flip, Flop and Fly", co-written and originally popularized by Big Joe Turner. All three songs were contained in Downchild's second album, Straight Up (1973). "Flip, Flop and Fly" was Downchild's only hit single, and became the signature song of Hock Walsh.

Despite being a co-founder of Downchild and closely identified with the band's sound, Hock Walsh would leave, rejoin and be replaced as lead singer in the band on several occasions. He was first fired from the band in 1974, shortly before work began on the band's third album, Dancin'. Hock rejoined the band in 1977 and 1985. He was fired by his brother Donnie for a final time in 1990.

During his periods away from Downchild, Hock Walsh continued to play regularly. In 1978, he was a founding member of what would become the Cameo Blues Band, a legendary Toronto house band playing blues and rhythm and blues music at the Hotel Isabella. He was succeeded in the Cameo Blues Band by Tony Flaim and, later, Chuck Jackson, both of whom would also succeed him in Downchild.

The last time the Donnie and Hock Walsh saw each other was eighteen months before the death of Hock Walsh, when Hock jammed with Downchild at an Etobicoke club. When asked whether this involved a reconciliation between the brothers, letting bygones be bygones, Donnie Walsh replied, "There are no bygones. We just don't have anything in common, really." Hock Walsh died on December 31, 1999, 12 days after his 51st birthday, of an apparent heart attack. He had been scheduled to perform a New Year's Eve concert with blues singer Rita Chiarelli. His last recordings were three tracks on 4 Blues, the 1998 debut album of Toronto's Dave Glover, aka Big Daddy G. He was survived by his son.

On February 6, 2000, a benefit concert in tribute to Hock Walsh was held in Toronto, with proceeds to provide educational support for Hock's son. Among those appearing at the benefit were Big Daddy G, Gordie Johnson of Big Sugar, the Downchild Blues Band and former Downchild vocalist Tony Flaim. The evening ended with a group rendition of Hock's signature song, "Flip, Flop and Fly".

== Tributes ==
Some people have had so much character when they were alive that they linger on in memories and, sometimes if we're lucky, in song by imitation. No one who ever met singer Hock Walsh would have accused him of not being interesting or, for that matter, (being) unoriginal.

Alec Fraser, bass player and contemporary of Hock Walsh, "Hock Walsh lives on". Commentary, September 23, 2006; www.brokenjoe.ca.

...it was Hock's unique vocal style that brought (Downchild) their first success. Somehow conjuring the memory of great blues shouters of a bygone age (Joe Turner, Jimmy Rushing), he never stooped to mere imitation. He applied his individual stamp to every tune; when Hock sang a song, he owned it!

John Taylor, Tribute to Richard "Hock" Walsh, 1948–1999; www.canadianblues.ca

He was a fabulous singer; he could sing the blues better than anybody I've ever heard. He had the timing, the phrasing, a fabulous voice… he was just great.

Donnie Walsh, brother of Hock Walsh, 2003.

== Discography ==
=== Downchild Blues Band ===
==== Singles ====
- 1973, reissued 1974 "Flip, Flop And Fly" (Special)
- 1974 "I've Got Everything I Need (Almost)" (Special)

==== Albums ====
- 1971 Bootleg (Special)
- 1973 Straight Up (Special)
- 1989 Gone Fishing (Stony Plain/WEA)

=== Big Daddy G Revue ===
- 1998 4 Blues (Reggies/Independent)
