= Caribbean music in Canada =

Caribbean style music in Canada and music of the Caribbean Canadian community

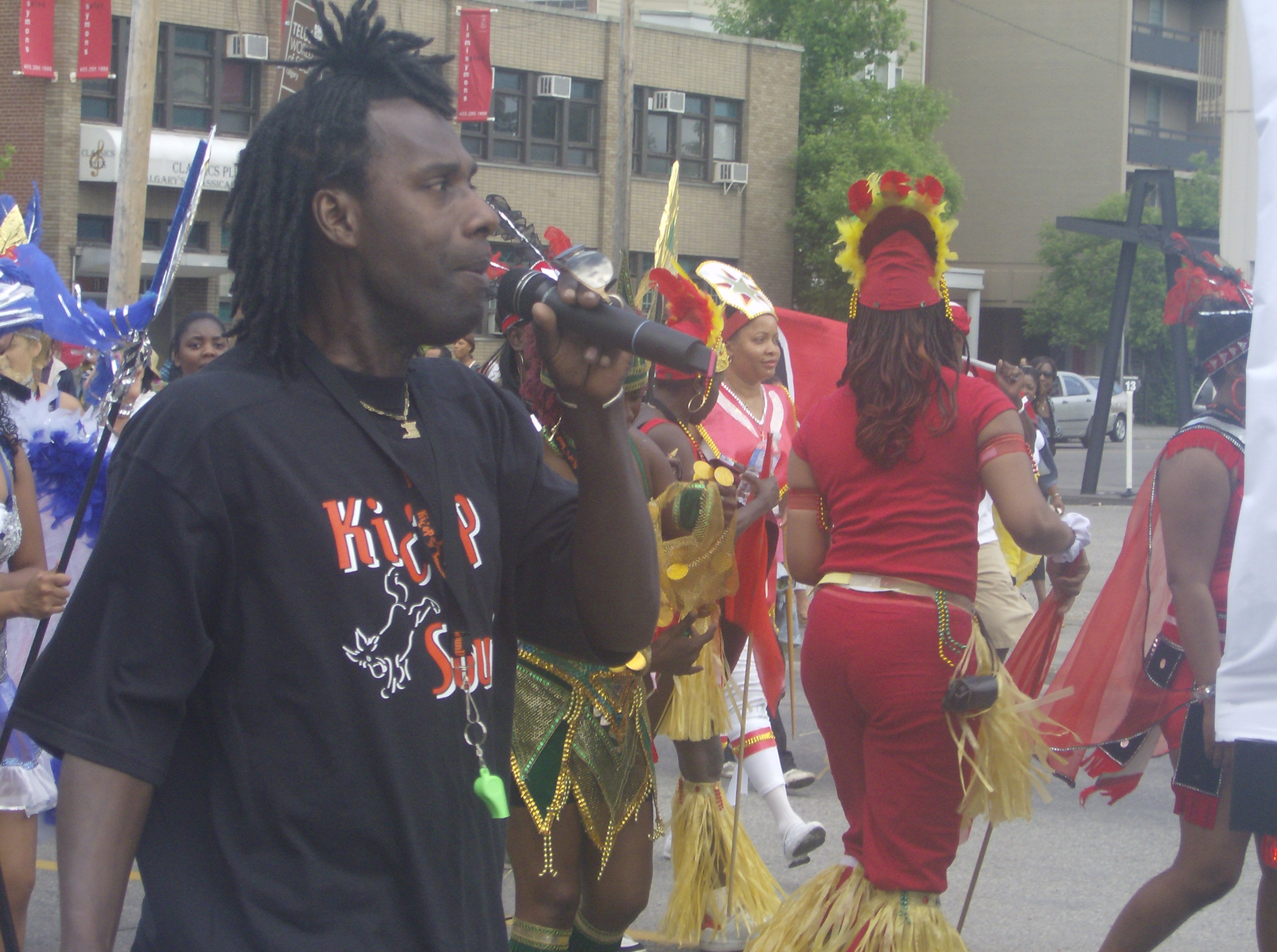
Christian Da Barber performs in Calgary at Carifest, a festival which showcases Caribbean culture in Canada (June 2007)

Caribbean music in Canada has existed since the early 1920s, becoming increasingly prominent after the 1960s as Caribbean immigration to Canada increased. Anglo-Caribbean genres such as reggae, soca and calypso are especially prominent in English Canada, while French Caribbean genres such as cadence-lypso, zouk and konpa are more prominent in Quebec.

Caribbean music has also been incorporated as an influence by numerous Canadian pop, rock and hip hop artists.

Recent changes in Canada's immigration laws have seen several prominent musicians from the Commonwealth Caribbean, like David Rudder and Anslem Douglas, resettle in Canada and help to develop the Caribbean music industry based there.

The role of music in the Caribbean Canadian community is reinforced by cultural festivals such as Toronto's Caribana and Edmonton’s Cariwest.

== 1960s and 1970s ==
Beginning in the mid-1960s, a wave of Caribbean musicians, especially but not exclusively from Jamaica, began to move to Toronto. Some of these, such as Jay Douglas, Jo Jo Bennett and Jackie Mittoo, pioneered the development of a reggae scene in the city, while others, such as Wayne McGhie, performed rhythm and blues, soul and funk in accordance with the dominant Toronto sound of the era.

== 1980s ==
Caribbean music began to actively break through into the Canadian cultural mainstream in the 1980s when Parachute Club, a band who incorporated reggae and soca rhythms into a mainstream new wave dance-pop style, broke through to mass popularity with their 1983 hit single "Rise Up".

Their success in turn paved the way for reggae and dub poetry artists such as Leroy Sibbles, Lillian Allen, Messenjah, Clifton Joseph and Sattalites to break through to larger audiences; the Juno Awards, Canada's primary music award, introduced an award for Reggae Recording of the Year in 1985.

Parachute Club percussionist Billy Bryans, whose interest in Caribbean music had been influential in the introduction of reggae and soca elements into the band's sound, also went on to become Canada's first prominent and influential promoter and producer of homegrown Caribbean and Latin American music, producing albums for and managing numerous artists and acting, according to Brazilian Canadian singer-songwriter Aline Morales, as "a bridge between world music and the Canadian music scene".

== 1990s ==
Noted developments in Caribbean music in the 1990s included Jane Bunnett's early explorations of Afro-Cuban jazz, Snow's worldwide 1993 hit single "Informer", the incorporation of reggae and dub influences by blues-rock band Big Sugar, the reggae rock band Raggadeath, and the 1998 hit single "Who Let the Dogs Out?", written by Trinidadian-Canadian musician Anslem Douglas.

With the Black Canadian community dominated by people of Caribbean heritage, Caribbean music also emerged as a major influence on the development of Canadian hip hop in this era — most notably on influential albums such as Dream Warriors' And Now the Legacy Begins and Michie Mee's Jamaican Funk—Canadian Style, which extensively incorporated reggae and other Caribbean styles.

Ron Nelson has played an important role in promoting reggae in Canada through his ReggaeMania radio show, which ran on CKLN-FM from 1993 to 2011, an early and important platform for promoting Reggae music in the Toronto area for almost two decades and continues as ReggaeMania.com, an online radio station and hub, as well as his work as a music promoter and concert organizer in Toronto.

== 2000s ==
Stations like Flow FM, CHIN-FM, G98.7 and, until 2011, CKLN-FM, located in Toronto, Ontario have served to bind the Caribbean music industry with their regularly rotated scheduling for soca and calypso music.

The Canadian Urban Music Awards have also begun to award various award titles in the soca and reggae genres.

In 2007, Anslem Douglas who originally wrote the song "Who Let the Dogs Out?", re-entered the Caribbean music scene after a four-year hiatus. Douglas recorded several of his 2007 Carnival songs from Canada.

Noted artists in the genre to emerge in this era included South Rakkas Crew and Kobo Town, both of whom have had albums nominated for the Polaris Music Prize, Carl Henry who released songs in both English and French, and Alex Cuba, a Cuban-born guitarist who has had success both as a solo artist and as a collaborator with pop singer Nelly Furtado. Singer-songwriter Danny Michel also received critical and commercial acclaim for his 2012 album Black Birds Are Dancing Over Me, recorded in Belize with a group of musicians credited as the Garifuna Collective.

== See also ==
- Music of Canada
- Caribana
- Reggae Lane, a roadway near the heart of Toronto’s reggae scene
- Toronto Caribbean Festival
- The Legacy Awards
- Carifest Calgary
- Cariwest Edmonton
- i-Land Fest
- Caribbean Days Festival
- List of Caribbean music genres
- Music of the Lesser Antilles
- Caribbean music in the United Kingdom
