= Dennis Ruffo =

Canadian music promoter

Dennis Ruffo is a Canadian music promoter, based in Ottawa, Ontario, Canada.

== History ==
Dennis Ruffo commenced his music promotion career in the 1970s in Ottawa, Ontario, Canada booking smaller venues. In 1982, he was hired as its general manager by Bass Clef Entertainment, a major Canadian concert promoter co-owned by Harvey Glatt and Harold Levin. Ruffo was selected over Arthur Fogel, who subsequently joined Michael Cohl and Live Nation Entertainment. It was through meeting Ruffo, who had booked the Wells-Davidson Band, in which Fogel was the drummer, that Arthur Fogel initially developed his interest in concert promotion.

Ruffo's initial concert promotion activities with Bass Clef Entertainment included concerts by Culture Club and Duran Duran.

In 1994, Ruffo became the Vice-President of Bretton Woods Entertainment, a company owned by Ottawa entrepreneur Bruce Firestone. Firestone had also acquired the Ottawa Rough Riders football franchise. Ruffo concurrently became a Vice-President and Alternate Governor of the football club during 1994.

In 1995, Ruffo continued his concert promotion career as Dennis Ruffo Productions. Later promotional activities by Ruffo have included concerts by Great Big Sea, Bonnie Raitt, ZZ Top and the Trailer Park Boys. Ruffo has also co-produced concerts with Montreal promoter Rubin Fogel and with House of Blues Concerts Canada.
