= Rise Up (Parachute Club song) =

Song from Parachute Club

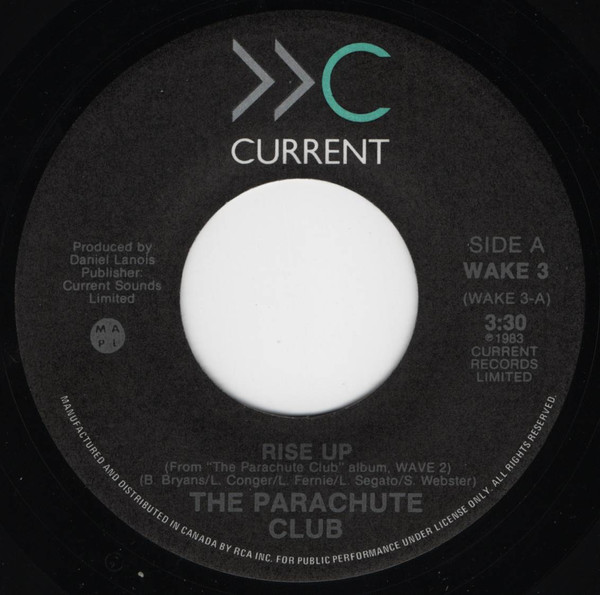

Single by The Parachute Club

from the album The Parachute Club
- B-side: "Tobago Style"
- Released: 1983
- Genre: New wave; synth-pop
- Length: 5:13 (LP version); 3:30 (7" version); 4:06 (Video version)
- Label: Current Records (Canada); RCA Records (U.S.)
- Songwriters: Billy Bryans, Lauri Conger, Lorraine Segato, Lynne Fernie, Steve Webster
- Producer: Daniel Lanois

Music video
- "Rise Up (Canadian Video Version)" on YouTube

"Rise Up" is a pop song recorded by the Canadian group the Parachute Club on their self-titled 1983 album. It was produced and engineered by Daniel Lanois, and written by Parachute Club members Billy Bryans, Lauri Conger, Lorraine Segato and Steve Webster, with additional lyrics contributed by filmmaker Lynne Fernie.

An upbeat call for peace, celebration, and "freedom / to love who we please," the song was a national hit in Canada, and was hailed as a unique achievement in Canadian pop music:

Rarely does one experience a piece of music in white North America where the barrier between participant and observer breaks down. Rise Up rises right up and breaks down the wall.

According to Segato, the song was not written with any one individual group in mind, but as a universal anthem of freedom and equality; Fernie described the song's lyrics as having been inspired in part by West Coast First Nations rituals in which young girls would "rise up" at dawn to adopt their adult names as a rite of passage.

It remains the band's most famous song, and has been adopted as an activist anthem for causes as diverse as gay rights, feminism, anti-racism and the New Democratic Party. As well, the song's reggae and soca-influenced rhythms made it the first significant commercial breakthrough for Caribbean music in Canada.

The song's first ever live public performance took place at the 1983 Toronto Pride parade.

== Awards ==
It won the Juno Award for Single of the Year at the Juno Awards of 1984, over fellow nominees "Cuts Like a Knife" and "Straight from the Heart" by Bryan Adams, "Sunglasses at Night" by Corey Hart, and "The Safety Dance" by Men Without Hats. Its video, directed by Robert Fresco, was a nominee for Video of the Year.

In 2005, the CBC Radio series 50 Tracks: The Canadian Version, based on nominations by panelists and listeners, semi-final elimination votes among songs from the same decade and a final national vote to rank the top 50, selected "Rise Up" as number 44 of the 50 most essential songs in Canadian popular music history. It is also included in Oh What A Feeling: A Vital Collection of Canadian Music (MCA Records, 1996).

== Use in advertising ==
In 1998, the song was licensed by EMI Music Canada to McCain Foods for a television commercial for its line of frozen rising-crust pizzas. Members of Parachute Club publicly opposed this commercial use of the song and commenced a legal action for breach of copyright against EMI Music Canada and McCain Foods. A spokesperson for EMI Music Canada stated that "the contract…allows us to license the song in all commercials and films except for political endorsements, religious messages and X-rated motion pictures, so we had no reason to believe that they would object."

While the position of EMI Music Canada concerned economic rights, the music publisher had overlooked the concept of "moral rights" recognized as being protected under Canadian copyright law. While EMI Music Canada had been granted the right to license the song, band members had the moral right to prevent its association with a product that brought their reputation into disrepute.

In a news release issued at the time of the commencement of the litigation, band members stated that "[a]s a result of its use on the ad ... the song, the people who believe in it and the reputation of its creators have suffered damage within the sphere of public credibility and our personal reputations". The action was settled before trial, with the result that band members were able to recover from EMI Music Canada all the band members' music publishing rights.

== Use in politics ==
In his 2003 run for the leadership of the federal New Democratic Party, Jack Layton, a longtime friend of the band and a childhood friend of Bryans, asked Segato for permission to use "Rise Up" in his campaign. "Over the years," said Segato, "many political parties have either used or wanted to use the song 'Rise Up' for their campaign. Most of the time, they don't ask. They just use it until you say no. Well, Jack asked to use our song and I said, Forget it, we'll write you your own anthem."

Segato, with Richard Underhill and Lynne Fernie, subsequently penned a new campaign song, "Bringing All the Voices Together", for Layton. While distinct in music and lyrics, it was identified as something of a sequel to "Rise Up"; in addition to broadly thematic similarities, the song's lyrics directly alluded to the original song's announcement that "it's time for celebration". "It's a new version of Rise Up, not the lyrics but the spirit," Layton said.

Segato performed "Rise Up" live at Layton's state funeral on August 27, 2011. She had also performed the song at Layton's 1988 wedding to Olivia Chow.

The original recording was used as the opening theme music to the 2013 CBC Television film Jack. The film, which stars Rick Roberts as Layton, also reenacts a real-life occasion in which Layton led a staff singalong of the song on the NDP's campaign tour bus.

== Remixes and covers ==
The Nylons performed an a cappella cover of the song on their 1989 album, Rockapella.

In 2014, the surviving band members released a contemporary dance remix of the song in conjunction with Toronto's hosting of the 2014 edition of WorldPride; the event had selected "Rise Up" as its theme and slogan. Additionally, in the summer of 2014, Segato, who was a musician in residence in the Regent Park area of Toronto, released a remix of the single titled "Rize Time". It featured a performance of spoken word poetry by Regent Park native Mustafa the Poet on the prelude.

In 2018 and 2019, several new covers of the song by collective supergroups of Canadian musicians were released to celebrate the song's 35th anniversary. A country music version credited to The Common Cause Collective featured Gord Bamford, Meghan Patrick, Tim Hicks, Kira Isabella, Brett Kissel, Jess Moskaluke, Jason McCoy, Tebey, Don Amero and The Washboard Union, while an updated pop version and a dance remix credited to The New Parachute Collective were led by Segato and her original Parachute Club colleagues Julie Masi and Dave Gray, along with contributions by Theo Tams, Jimmy Chauveau, Jilea, Kayla Diamond, Maya Kiltron and Britta Badour. Proceeds from sales of the new versions were directed to four charitable organizations: Canadian Roots Youth Reconciliation, Institute for Change Leaders, ECOJUSTICE, and Supporting Our Youth.

== Chart positions ==
Year	Chart	Peak Position
1983	Canadian RPM 50 Singles	9
1983	Billboard Dance Music/Club Play Singles	26

== Year-end Charts ==
Chart (1983)	Position
Canada Top Singles (RPM)	62

=== Award successions ===
Preceded by "Eyes of a Stranger" by Payola$	Juno Award for Single of the Year; 1984	Succeeded by "Never Surrender" by Corey Hart
