= Steve Webster =

Steve Webster may refer to:

- Steve Webster (sidecar racer) (born 1960), English sidecar racer
- Steve Webster (golfer) (born 1975), English golfer
- Steve Webster (bassist) (born 1958), Canadian bassist

== See also ==
- Stephen Webster (born 1959), British jewellery designer
- Stephen W. Webster (born 1943), Vermont attorney and politician
