= Parachute club =

Parachute club may refer to:

- a club of parachuting and skydiving enthusiasts
- The Parachute Club, a Canadian band
