= Happy Feet (disambiguation) =

Happy Feet is a 2006 animated family film.

Happy Feet may also refer to:

- Happy Feet (video game), a 2006 action-adventure game
- Happy Feet (Emilie-Claire Barlow album), 2003
- Happy Feet, an album by 8½ Souvenirs
- Happy Feet (penguin), an emperor penguin in New Zealand
- "Happy Feet" (song), a song from the 1930 film King of Jazz
- "Happy Feet", a song by Quincy Jones from the Walk, Don't Run soundtrack
- Happy Feet: The Savoy Ballroom Lindy Hoppers and Me, a children's book by Richard Michelson

== See also ==
- Happy Feet Two, the 2011 sequel to the 2006 film
