= Julie Masi =

- Born: Julie Opocensky; Manitoba, Canada
- Occupation: Musician
- Instruments: Percussion, vocals

Julie Ann Masi is a Canadian musician, principally known as a percussionist and vocalist with The Parachute Club. She was also a co-writer of several of the band's songs. She is notable as being part of a female-driven movement mixing music and political activism, emanating from Toronto in the 1980s. She continues to perform and record on occasion.

== History ==
Julie Masi was born Julie Opocensky and raised on a farm near Dominion City, Manitoba. She commenced performing at the age of 11, initially in choirs. Her father then bought her a drum kit and her sister Janet an electronic keyboard. She started performing with her sister and older brother Bobby on guitar at house parties in southern Manitoba. Following the death of their brother in 1968, Masi, at the age of 14 and her sister joined a band composed of members from the neighbouring communities of Emerson, Letellier, and St. Pierre-Jolys. The group performed regularly throughout southern Manitoba, as ManMaid, between 1968 and early 1970. The band was distinctive at the time in having two female members, both musicians, one of whom (Masi) played drums.

Masi moved to Winnipeg in 1970, following high school, and sang various musical genres in local bands for a decade. She also obtained regular work as a session vocalist, including singing jingles and recording sessions with Burton Cummings and Tim Thorney.

Masi relocated to Toronto and adopted the surname Masi following her marriage to Agostino Masi, a Winnipeg entrepreneur, in the early 1980s. She joined The Parachute Club in 1983, after its initial founding members, Billy Bryans, Lorraine Segato, and Lauri Conger, had been offered a management and recording contract with Current Records. She was with the band between 1983 and 1986, leaving after the band's Canadian tour in support of its third album. Some of the songs she co-wrote while with the band include "Slip Away" (from The Parachute Club), "At the Feet of the Moon" (title track and lead single from At the Feet of the Moon), and "Secret Heart (Wild Zone)" (from Small Victories). She has contributed to the recordings of Martha and the Muffins and Raffi, among others, and has also collaborated with the band Images in Vogue.

Subsequent to her departure from The Parachute Club, Masi was involved in session work for various artists, including Dan Hill, Bruce Cockburn, Shirley Eikhard, Alannah Myles, Leonard Cohen, Ken Whiteley, and David Foster. From 1990 to 2005, Masi resided in Temecula, California, where her husband had an interest in a restaurant. Based in Kelowna, British Columbia as of 2005, Masi continues to perform, including occasional reunions with the Parachute Club. She also continues to contribute to the recordings of others. She is active in supporting those affected by HIV/AIDS, and is also a supporter and fundraiser for Bicycles for Humanity, a Kelowna-based charitable organization providing bicycles to impoverished persons in Africa.

== Discography ==
=== Singles ===
Release date	Title	Chart peak	Album
Release date	Title	Canada RPM	Album
July 1983	"Rise Up"	9	The Parachute Club
1983	"Alienation"		The Parachute Club
1984	"Boy's Club"		The Parachute Club
October 1984	"At the Feet of the Moon"	11	At The Feet of the Moon
February 1985	"Act of an Innocent"	61	At The Feet of the Moon
June 1985	"Sexual Intelligence"		At The Feet of the Moon
October 1986	"Love Is Fire"	24	Small Victories
February 1987	"Love and Compassion"	81	Small Victories
May 1987	"Walk to the Rhythm"	90	Small Victories

=== Albums ===
==== With The Parachute Club ====
- 1983 The Parachute Club Current/RCA
- 1984 At the Feet of the Moon Current/RCA
- 1985 Moving Thru the Moonlight Current/RCA; remixes
- 1986 Small Victories Current/RCA
- 1992 Wild Zone: The Essential Parachute Club BMG; reissued 2006 by EMI International

==== Other ====
- 1977 Ron Paley, Boxton
- 1984 Martha and the Muffins, Mystery Walk
- 1990 Raffi, Evergreen Everblue
- 1997 Al Simmons, Celery Stalks at Midnight
- 2008 Lindsay May, Bronze and Blue
