= The Very Thought of You (Emilie-Claire Barlow album) =

Studio album by Emilie-Claire Barlow
- Released: 2007
- Genre: Jazz
- Length: 56:54
- Label: Empress Music Group
- Producer: Emilie-Claire Barlow

Emilie-Claire Barlow chronology
| Winter Wonderland (2006) | The Very Thought of You (2007) | Haven't We Met? (2009) |

The Very Thought of You is an album by Canadian jazz singer Emilie-Claire Barlow. It was released in 2007 and nominated for Vocal Jazz Album of the Year at the Juno Awards of 2008.

== Track listing ==
| No. | Title | Length |
|---|---|---|
| 1. | "The Very Thought of You" (Ray Noble) | 6:38 |
| 2. | "Almost Like Being in Love" (Frederick Loewe, Alan Jay Lerner) | 3:43 |
| 3. | "O Pato" (Jayme Silva, Neuza Teixeira) | 3:33 |
| 4. | "Les Yeux Ouverts" (Fabian Andre, Wilbur Schwandt, Gus Kahn) | 4:44 |
| 5. | "Pennies from Heaven" (Arthur Johnston, Johnny Burke) | 4:24 |
| 6. | "What a Little Moonlight Can Do" (Harry M. Woods) | 5:22 |
| 7. | "Surrey with the Fringe on Top" (Richard Rodgers, Oscar Hammerstein II) | 5:00 |
| 8. | "My Time of Day/I've Never Been in Love Before" (Frank Loesser) | 5:58 |
| 9. | "C'est si bon" (Henri Betti, André Hornez) | 3:49 |
| 10. | "De Conversa Em Conversa" (L.Alves, H.Barbosa) | 2:53 |
| 11. | "The Boy Next Door" (Hugh Martin, Ralph Blane) | 5:23 |
| 12. | "So Many Stars" (Marilyn Bergman, Alan Bergman, Sergio Mendes) | 5:27 |

== Personnel ==
- Emilie-Claire Barlow – vocal, shaker, triangle
- Kevin Turcotte – flugelhorn
- Kelly Jefferson – tenor saxophone
- Mike Murley – tenor saxophone
- Bill McBirnie – flute
- Nancy Walker – piano
- Reg Schwager – guitar
- Kieran Overs – bass guitar
- Mark Kelso – drums
- Alan Hetherington – percussion
- Drew Jurecka – violin
- Lenny Solomon – violin
- Kathryn Sugden – violin
- Rebecca van der Post – violin
- Rebekah Wolkstein – violin
- Anna Redekop – viola
- Claudio Vena – viola
- Alex Grant – cello
- Wendy Solomon – cello
