= Melanie Doane =

Canadian musician

Background information
- Born: Halifax, Nova Scotia, Canada
- Genres: Pop; rock
- Occupations: Singer; musician
- Instruments: Guitar; ukulele
- Years active: 1990s–present
- Labels: Sony; Columbia; MapleMusic; Actorboy; Warner; Prairie Ocean
- Website: melaniedoane.com

Melanie Doane is a Canadian singer, songwriter, actress, and music educator.

== Early years ==
Daughter of J. Chalmers Doane, a music educator and member of the Order of Canada, Doane learned many instruments at a young age, including piano, bass guitar, mandolin, guitar, violin. After high school, she studied music at Dalhousie University with the intention of becoming a music teacher. Her career path changed after she received a role in Neptune Theatre's production of Joseph and the Amazing Technicolor Dreamcoat in 1986. She was cast regularly in productions at Neptune for two years before moving to Toronto in 1988. Over the next few years Doane played roles in various theatre productions, including Fire! and Buddy – The Buddy Holly Story on Broadway.

== Music career ==
In 1993, Doane released the EP Harvest Train independently. Some of the songs drew the attention of Sony Music Canada, and she was signed to the label. She recorded her debut album, Shakespearean Fish in 1996.

Although the album wasn't a hit on commercial radio, it was noticed by record producer Rick Neigher in Los Angeles. He worked with Doane on the second album, Adam's Rib (1998). The title song became the album's first Top 40 hit, followed by "Waiting for the Tide", "Goliath", and "Happy Homemaker". She toured in support of the album for two years with Jann Arden, Great Big Sea, The Philosopher Kings, and Lilith Fair.

In 1999, Doane won the Juno Award for New Artist of the Year. After touring, she left Sony Music Canada. Through a partnership with Ted Dykstra and actor Gary Sinise, she began working on another album with Neigher in Los Angeles. During the recording process, she gave birth to her first child, worked as a session musician, wrote songs with SHeDAISY, starred in the independent film Black Swan, and released the live album Melvin Live.

You Are What You Love was released by Actorboy Records and Warner Music Canada. The single "Still Desire You" reached the Top 5 at Canadian radio stations and its accompanying music video reached No. 1 on MuchMoreMusic's viewer's choice countdown. During promotion, she gave birth to her second child.

In 2007, Doane began working on an album that was inspired by motherhood. Initially dubbed a lullaby album, the resulting independent release A Thousand Nights had much wider appeal, mixing covers by Fleetwood Mac, The Everly Brothers, and Leonard Cohen with originals by Doane and including guests Jim Cuddy, Ron Sexsmith, Kathryn Rose, Emilie-Claire Barlow, and Ted Dykstra. Released in 2008, A Thousand Nights was preceded by the lead single "Songbird" featuring Cuddy, which became a Top 5 hit on the iTunes country singles chart in Canada. Doane's "Every Little Thing" and "Chopin Ballad" each received placements in the television shows Being Erica and Flashpoint. In 2007, 2008, 2010, and 2013, she was the featured entertainer on the Canadian Pacific Railway Holiday Train Tour. Each tour consisted of approximately 60 shows over the span of three weeks in various communities in the United States and Canada.

Doane began working on a new studio album in 2009 with her brother and drummer Creighton Doane at his studio in Toronto. Throughout the recording process, early demos of tracks "Back To LA", "Make God Laugh", "From Your Lips to God's Ears", "Sweet on You", and "The Stupider I Am" were given away as free downloads via Doane's official website. In the summer of 2010, "Sweet on You" reached #1 on the East Coast Countdown, a popular radio show in Atlantic Canada. In December 2010, The Emerald City was announced with a March 1, 2011 release date.

=== War Horse ===
Shortly after the release of The Emerald City in 2011, Doane was asked to audition for the role of "Song Woman" in Mirvish's Toronto production of the acclaimed play War Horse. She was offered the role and began rehearsals for the production in December 2011. The play opened at the Princess of Wales Theatre in February 2012 to rave reviews, and eventually closed after a successful run on January 6, 2013. Of Doane's role in the production, Toronto Star's Richard Ouzounian wrote:

Through it all, the soaringly symphonic score of Adrian Sutton contrasts with the simple songs selected by John Tams, sung here with poignant effect by Melanie Doane.

Pat Donnelly of Postmedia News wrote:

The manner in which traditional songs (performed principally, in this production by the multi-talented Melanie Doane, who does wonders with voice and violin) are deftly woven into the narrative, uplifting it into anthem, is masterful.

=== Song placements ===
- Being Erica – "Every Little Thing" (3 episodes)
- Flashpoint – "Chopin Ballad"
- Brothers and Sisters – "Good Gifts"
- Buffy The Vampire Slayer – "I Can't Take My Eyes Off You"
- Dawson's Creek – "Bionic"
- Party of Five – "Absolutely Happy", "Waiting for the Tide"
- That's Life – "Way Past Blue", "Still Desire You", "You Are What You Love", "Bionic", "I Can't Take My Eyes Off You"
- Baywatch Hawaii – "I Can't Take My Eyes Off You"
- Resurrection Blvd – "Absolutely Happy", "Waiting for the Tide", "I Can't Take My Eyes Off You", "How You Cried", "Good Gifts"
- Prom Queen: The Marc Hall Story – "You Are What You Love"
- Santa Baby – "Happy Together"
- Servitude – "How Can a Girl"

== Music education/Doane Uschool ==
In 2009–2010, Melanie volunteered to teach a small group of students at her children's school in Toronto using the method of ukulele instruction established by her father, J. Chalmers Doane in the 1960s. Now a registered charity, Doane Uschool (www.uschool.ca) teaches over 1000 students each week in schools throughout Toronto and Nova Scotia. Melanie lends exposure to her groups through concerts, recording projects with artists like Jann Arden and Barenaked Ladies, appearances in the PanAm Games, with Chris Hadfield in the International Space Station, the CBC Music Festival and the 2018 Luminato Festival.

== Ukulele U ==
In 2022, Doane's new children's show Ukulele U debuted on CBC Television and CBC Gem. She co-created the show with legendary music producer Bob Ezrin.

In addition to hosting the show, Doane is also an executive producer, writer, and composer on the show. She received two Canadian Screen Award nominations at the 11th Canadian Screen Awards in 2023, for Best Performance in a Children's or Youth Program or Series and Best Original Song in Television for "Use Your Outside Voice", alongside her brother Creighton and Bob Ezrin.

== Discography ==
=== Albums ===
- 1993: Harvest Train
- 1996: Shakespearean Fish
- 1998: Adam's Rib
- 2001: Melvin Live
- 2003: You Are What You Love
- 2008: A Thousand Nights
- 2011: The Emerald City

== Awards and nominations ==
- 1999 Won for Best New Solo Artist - Juno Awards
- 1999 Won for Most Charted Rock Artist for "Adam's Rib" - Canadian Radio Music Awards
- 1999 Nominated for Album of The Year for "Adam's Rib" - East Coast Music Awards
- 1999 Nominated for Best Pop/Rock Artist - East Coast Music Awards
- 1999 Nominated for Single of The Year for "Adam's Rib" - East Coast Music Awards
- 1999 Nominated for SOCAN Songwriter of The Year for "Adam's Rib" - East Coast Music Awards
- 1999 Nominated for Best New Artist - East Coast Music Awards
- 2003 Won for Best International Actress (for "Black Swan") - New York International Independent Film and Video Festival
- 2004 Nominated for Entertainer of The Year - East Coast Music Awards
- 2004 Nominated for Best Pop Recording for "You Are What You Love" - East Coast Music Awards
- 2004 Nominated for Best Female Artist - East Coast Music Awards
