= Steve Webster (bassist) =

- Born: 18 July 1958 (age 68); Toronto, Ontario, Canada
- Occupations: Musician; composer; arranger; producer; audio engineer; Video Editor / Content Creator
- Years active: 1980–present
- Children: 1
- Musical career
- Genres: Alternative rock; jazz
- Instruments: Bass; keyboards * electric guitar

Steve Webster is a Canadian bassist, record producer, arranger, audio engineer, and composer. A multiple Juno Award nominee and winner, Webster's career spans over 4 decades of music production and performance. Recent accomplishments include Juno Award nominations for Producer of the Year and Jazz Vocal Album of the Year for Emilie-Claire Barlow's album Clear Day. Webster is an inductee to Canadian Songwriters Hall of Fame, for his contribution to The Parachute Club song "Rise Up", and has also been honoured by Canada's Walk of Fame.

A founding member of Canada's The Parachute Club, Webster was part of Toronto's vibrant music scene in the 1980s and 1990s, working often at Hamilton's Grant Avenue Studio, home to Daniel Lanois and David Bottrill. Webster has worked with other notable producers Mick Ronson, Keith Forsey, David Tyson, Michael Beinhorn and Rick Parashar.

Webster recorded and performed live with Canadian stars Alannah Myles, Dalbello, and Carole Pope. He also played bass on Billy Idol's Rebel Yell album and subsequent 1984 tour.

In 1986, Webster joined Toronto jingle company The Air Company beginning a 20-year career composing music for television commercials. He would later become a composer and partner in then Canada's top jingle company RMW Music.

Webster was invited to perform the song "Rise Up" with Lorraine Segato at Jack Layton's state funeral in 2011. Webster co-wrote and recorded the bass for Rise Up on the eponymously titled The Parachute Club album. He also shared a Juno Award for "Rise Up" which won Single of the Year in 1984.

== Recording and touring ==
Year	Artist	Recording	Role	Tour	Certified Sales	Awards & Nominations
1980	Drastic Measures	Drastic Measures	Bass	✓		
1981	The Time Twins		Bass	✓		
1981	Christopher Ward		Bass	✓		
1983	Colin Linden		Bass	✓		
1983	The Parachute Club	The Parachute Club	Bass, Composer	✓	Gold Can	Juno Win & Nomination
1984	The Pukka Orchestra	The Pukka Orchestra	Bass	✓		
1984	Billy Idol	Rebel Yell	Bass	✓	Platinum U.S.& Can	
1985	The CeeDees	The CeeDees	Producer			
1986	Aaron Davis	Neon Blue	Bass			
1987	Dalbello	she	Bass	✓		
1987	David Wilcox	Breakfast at the Circus	Bass		Gold Can	
1987	New Regime	The Race	Producer, Bass			
1988	Strange Advance	The Distance Between	Bass			
1989	Alannah Myles	Alannah Myles	Bass	✓	Platinum U.S. & Diamond Can	
1989	Ray Lyell	Ray Lyell & the Storm	Bass			
1990	Partland Brothers	Between Worlds	Bass			
1991	Honey Moon Suite	Monsters under the Bed	Bass			
1989	Ray Lyell	Ray Lyell & the Storm	Bass			
1993	Marc Jordan	Reckless Valentine				
1994	David Gogo	David Gogo	Bass			
1996	Dalbello	whore	Bass			
1999	King Brand Valium	Live at the Hooch	Bass, Producer	✓		
2000	Damhnait Doyle	Hyperdramatic	Bass	✓		
2000	j. englishman	poor lil' rockstar	Engineer, bass			
2001	Smoother	Chasing the Dragon	Engineer			
2001	Sugar Jones	Sugar Jones	Bass		Gold Can	
2015	Lorraine Segato	Invincible Decency	Bass			
2014	Emilie-Claire Barlow	Neige	Engineer, Producer		Gold Can	
2015	Emilie-Claire Barlow	Clear Day	Producer			Juno Nomination
2017	Emilie-Claire Barlow	Lumiéres d'hiver	Producer, guitar, drums			
2024	Emilie-Claire Barlow	Spark Bird	Producer, Arranger, Recording Engineer, Mixing, Mastering			
2025	Sofia Guzmán	Rumbo al Sol	Bass, Guitar, Percussion, Piano, Producer, Arranger, Recording Engineer, Mixing, Mastering			
