= Tribute (Emilie-Claire Barlow album) =

Studio album by Emilie-Claire Barlow
- Released: 2001
- Recorded: 2001
- Genre: Vocal jazz
- Length: 64:04
- Label: Rhythm Tracks
- Producer: Brian Barlow, Emilie-Claire Barlow

Emilie-Claire Barlow chronology
Sings (1998)	Tribute (2001)	Happy Feet (2003)

Tribute is an album by Canadian jazz singer Emilie-Claire Barlow. It was released in 2001 and nominated for Best Vocal Jazz Album at the 2002 Juno Awards.

== Track listing ==
1. "Air Mail Special/It Don't Mean a Thing (If It Ain't Got That Swing)" (Benny Goodman, Jimmy Mundy, Charlie Christian/Duke Ellington, Irving Mills)
2. "Águas de Março" (Antônio Carlos Jobim)
3. "Twisted" (Wardell Gray, Annie Ross)
4. "La Belle Dame Sans Regret" (Dominic Miller, Sting)
5. "Strayhorn Medley" (Billy Strayhorn)
6. "Summer Song" (Dave Brubeck)
7. "De Flor em Flor" (Djavan)
8. "Spain" (Chick Corea, Joaquín Rodrigo)
9. "Jobim Medley" (Ray Gilbert, Jobim )
10. "Mood Indigo" (Barney Bigard, Ellington, Mills)
