= Like a Lover =

Studio album by Emilie-Claire Barlow
- Released: 2005
- Genre: Jazz
- Length: 54:44
- Label: Empress Music Group
- Producer: Emilie-Claire Barlow

Emilie-Claire Barlow chronology
Happy Feet (2003)	Like a Lover (2005)	Winter Wonderland (2006)

Like a Lover is an album by Canadian jazz singer Emilie-Claire Barlow. It was released by her label, Empress Music Group, in 2005.

== Track listing ==
No.	Title	Length
1.	"Like a Lover" (Marilyn Bergman, Alan Bergman, Dori Caymmi, Nelson Motta)	5:29
2.	"On the Sunny Side of the Street" (Jimmy McHugh, Dorothy Fields)	6:46
3.	"Someone to Watch Over Me" (George Gershwin, Ira Gershwin)	4:55
4.	"A Time for Love" (Johnny Mandel, Paul Francis Webster)	5:16
5.	"So Danço Samba" (Antonio Carlos Jobim, Vinicius de Moraes)	4:46
6.	"The Things We Did Last Summer" (Sammy Cahn, Jule Styne)	5:03
7.	"(I've Got) Just About Everything I Need" (Bob Dorough)	4:21
8.	"Retrato Em Branco E Preto" (Jobim)	5:14
9.	"Love Is Here to Stay" (Gershwin, Gershwin)	5:00
10.	"Blame It on My Youth" (Edward Heyman, Oscar Levant)	3:49
11.	"Like a Lover (remix)"	3:59

== Personnel ==
- Emilie-Claire Barlow – vocal, piano, percussion
- Guido Basso – flugelhorn
- John Johnson – tenor saxophone (on track 5)
- Kelly Jefferson – tenor saxophone (on tracks 2 & 7)
- Daniel LeBlanc – keyboards (on track 11)
- Justin Abedin – guitar (on track 11)
- Rob Piltch – guitar
- Marc Rogers – bass guitar
- Mark Kelso – drums
