= Margo Davidson =

Canadian musician (1957–2008)

- Wells - Davidson Band, circa 1979. Davidson is third from left.

Background information
- Born: September 28, 1957
- Origin: Simcoe, Ontario
- Died: May 17, 2008 (aged 50)
- Genres: Rhythm and blues, blues, rock, pop
- Occupations: Musician, advocate for the homeless
- Instruments: Saxophone, percussion, vocals

Margo Isabella Davidson (September 28, 1957 – May 17, 2008) was a founding member of The Parachute Club, for which she was saxophonist, percussionist and vocalist. and an advocate for the homeless.

== Early life and education ==
Davidson was born in Simcoe, Ontario, and attended Simcoe Composite School where she developed her musical talent. She was a diabetic from childhood. Davidson's father died in 1971; she had one brother and two step-siblings. Her brother David, a trombonist, was also involved in music, as a high school music teacher and performer.

Davidson initially played both piano and saxophone, and was a member of the Simcoe Composite School band. She formed her first music group, a jazz quartet, while a high school student, and played semi-professionally in the Simcoe area.

== Musical career ==
Davidson arrived in Toronto from Simcoe in 1975, following graduation from Simcoe Composite School. She briefly attended the University of Toronto, and commenced playing with local bands. With Toronto female singer Robin Wells, with whom Davidson had been associated in a previous band, Davidson co-founded The Wells-Davidson Band in 1978, playing rhythm and blues and rock music. The band was one of a minority of bands led by two women. It was managed by Harbourfront Centre music programmer Derek Andrews. The drummer for the band was Arthur Fogel, who later became a concert promoter and executive with Live Nation Entertainment.

At that time, and through the 1980s, Davidson was also notable as one of very few female saxophonists playing professionally, predating such artists as Candy Dulfer, Katja Rieckermann and Colleen Allen. In terms of the Toronto music scene of the late 1970s, she was a contemporary of Dianne Heatherington, with whom she played on occasion. She also recorded with the Foxrun Band on their album You're Invited. Davidson later joined Kid Rainbow, a band established by Toronto singer-songwriter Gary O'Connor as a means to promote his songs. She also played in a stage version of The Rocky Horror Picture Show that toured Toronto and area venues. Both The Wells-Davidson Band and Kid Rainbow met with a degree of local success.

In 1982, Davison was invited to form The Parachute Club, along with former Mama Quilla II members Lorraine Segato and Lauri Conger, as well as Steve Webster, Billy Bryans, Julie Masi, and Dave Grey. Davidson was a saxophonist, percussionist and vocalist with The Parachute Club between 1982 and 1989, during which all of the band's recordings were made. The band, best known for their hit single "Rise Up", started out playing locally, and later toured across Canada, as well as in the United States and Germany.

As a member of The Parachute Club Davidson was the recipient of two Juno Awards for Most Promising Group of The Year in 1984 and for Group of the Year in 1985. Davidson's role with The Parachute Club was primarily as a musician and harmony vocalist, though she is also the co-writer (with John Oates, Lorraine Segato, and Lauri Conger) of "Love Is Fire", the lead single from the band's third album, Small Victories. The album was less successful that their previous one, and Parachute Club eventually broke up in 1989 (it was reconstituted in 2005 and continues to perform).

Davidson was briefly a member of the well-known Toronto band Bratty and The Babysitters, in 1988, when the future of The Parachute Club was uncertain, playing a mix of various musical genres. Bratty and the Babysitters disbanded in 1989, the same year that The Parachute Club formally disbanded for the first time, though the latter's last public performances became those at Toronto's Ontario Place in July 1988.

== Advocate for the homeless ==
After the initial breakup of The Parachute Club, Davidson, with the exception of the occasional guest performance, left the music business and spent the balance of her life working with organizations dedicated to assisting the homeless. Davidson became a creative writer and a director of St. Clare's Multifaith Housing Society, based in Toronto. She was also an outreach worker at Eva's Phoenix, a transitional housing project dedicated to life skills and homeless youth.

== Death ==
For much of her life, particularly in her later years, Davidson was affected by depression and alcoholism. Davidson died in her Toronto home on Saturday, May 17, 2008. Her funeral and interment were in Simcoe on May 23, 2008, and she was interred at Oakwood Cemetery, Simcoe. Her cause of death was not publicly disclosed, and Davidson left no publicly acknowledged partner.

== Discography ==
=== Singles ===
Release date	Title	Chart peak	Album
Release date	Title	Canada RPM	Album
July 1983	"Rise Up"	9	The Parachute Club
1983	"Alienation"		The Parachute Club
1984	"Boy's Club"		The Parachute Club
October 1984	"At The Feet Of The Moon"	11	At The Feet of the Moon
February 1985	"Act Of An Innocent"	61	At The Feet of the Moon
June 1985	"Sexual Intelligence"		At The Feet of the Moon
October 1986	"Love Is Fire"	24	Small Victories
February 1987	"Love And Compassion"	81	Small Victories
May 1987	"Walk To The Rhythm"	90	Small Victories
January 1988	"Big Big World"	93	Non-album single

=== Albums ===
==== With The Parachute Club ====
- 1983 The Parachute Club (Current/RCA)
- 1984 At The Feet of the Moon (Current/RCA)
- 1985 Moving Thru the Moonlight (Current/RCA; remixes)
- 1986 Small Victories (Current/RCA)
- 1992 Wild Zone: The Essential Parachute Club (BMG; Reissued 2006 by EMI International)

==== Other ====
- 1979 The Foxrun Band, You're Invited (Ariel Records)
- 1980 Bob Segarini, Goodbye L.A.
- 1984 Gerry Cott (The Boomtown Rats), I Left My Hat In Haiti (Polydor)
- 1985 Rough Trade, Birds of A Feather: The Best of Rough Trade (True North)
- 1989 Paul James, Rockin' The Blues (Stony Plain Records)
- 1993 The Whiteley Bros. Bluesology: A Journey Through the Blues (Borealis)
- 1997 A Celebration of Blues: Great Slide Guitar (St. Clair)
