= The Beat Goes On (Emilie-Claire Barlow album) =

Studio album by Emilie-Claire Barlow
- Released: October 12, 2010
- Recorded: 2009
- Studio: Doane-LeBlanc
- Genre: Jazz
- Length: 54:33
- Label: Empress Music Group

Emilie-Claire Barlow chronology
Haven't We Met? (2009)	The Beat Goes On (2010)	Seule ce soir (2012)

The Beat Goes On is an album by the Canadian jazz singer Emilie-Claire Barlow. This is Barlow's eighth jazz album and was released on October 12, 2010.

== Track listing ==
1. "Raindrops Keep Fallin' on My Head" (Burt Bacharach, Hal David)
2. "Sunshine Superman" (Donovan)
3. "Breaking Up Is Hard to Do" (Neil Sedaka, Howard Greenfield)
4. "Don't Think Twice, It's All Right" (Bob Dylan)
5. "He Thinks I Still Care" (Dickey Lee, Steve Duffy)
6. "The Beat Goes On/Soul Bossa Nova" (Sonny Bono/Quincy Jones)
7. "These Boots Are Made for Walkin'" (Lee Hazlewood)
8. "Until It's Time for You to Go" (Buffy Sainte-Marie)
9. "Little Boat (O Barquinho)" (Ronaldo Boscoli, Roberto Menescal)
10. "Comme Je Crie, Comme Je Chante"
11. "Will You Love Me Tomorrow" (Gerry Goffin, Carole King)
12. "Yester-Me, Yester-You, Yesterday" (Ron Miller, Bryan Wells)
13. "T'es Pas Un Autre" (Buffy Sainte-Marie)
