= Adam's Rib (album) =

Studio album by Melanie Doane
- Released: September 28, 1998
- Recorded: Sunset Sound & Moodus Noises, Los Angeles, California
- Genre: Pop, pop rock, folk rock
- Label: Sony Music Canada, Columbia Records
- Producer: Rick Neigher

Melanie Doane chronology
Shakespearean Fish (1996)	Adam's Rib (1998)	Melvin Live (2001)

Alternative cover

Singles from Adam's Rib
- 1. "Adam's Rib" Released: August 1998; 2. "Waiting for the Tide" Released: January 1999; 3. "Goliath" Released: June 1999; 4. "Happy Homemaker" Released: December 1999

Professional ratings
Review scores
Source	Rating
Allmusic	4.5/5 stars
ARTISTdirect	4.5/5 stars

Adam's Rib is the second album by Juno-Award-winning Canadian singer-songwriter Melanie Doane. It was first released on September 28, 1998, in Canada on Sony Music Entertainment, and subsequently on Columbia Records on August 24, 1999, in the United States. The album was produced by Rick Neigher.

== Track listing ==
1. "Adam's Rib" (Melanie Doane, Rick Neigher) – 3:37
2. "Happy Homemaker" (Melanie Doane, Rick Neigher) – 3:51
3. "There Is No Beautiful" (Melanie Doane, Rick Neigher) – 3:37
4. "Absolutely Happy" (Melanie Doane, David Martin) – 3:27
5. "Goliath" (Melanie Doane, Rick Neigher) – 3:51
6. "I Can't Take My Eyes Off You" (Melanie Doane, Kevin Fox) – 3:56
7. "Waiting for the Tide" (Melanie Doane, Rick Neigher) – 4:09
8. "How You Cried" (Melanie Doane) – 4:26
9. "The Space Between Us" (Melanie Doane, Creighton Doane, Steve Mayoff) – 5:04
10. "Mel's Rock Pile" (Traditional, Melanie Doane, Rick Neigher) – 3:27
11. "Good Gifts" (Melanie Doane) – 3:04
12. "Sweet Sorrow" (Melanie Doane, David Martin) – 4:04

== Song placements ==
- Brothers and Sisters – "Good Gifts"
- Buffy The Vampire Slayer – "I Can't Take My Eyes Off You"
- Party of Five – "Absolutely Happy", "Waiting For The Tide"
- That's Life – "I Can't Take My Eyes Off You"
- Baywatch Hawaii – "I Can't Take My Eyes Off You"
- Resurrection Blvd – "Absolutely Happy", "Waiting For The Tide", "I Can't Take My Eyes Off You", "How You Cried", "Good Gifts"

== Personnel ==
All information is taken from the liner notes on the CD and from the album review on ARTISTdirect.

- Melanie Doane – vocals, mandolin, violin, piano, bass, programming, background vocals, loops, main performer, arranger
- Rick Neigher – acoustic guitar, bass, arranger, electric guitar, background vocals, engineer, producer
- Tim Pierce – acoustic guitar, electric guitar, Boomerang guitar
- John Shanks – acoustic guitar, electric guitar, E-bow, bass
- Tommy Emmanuel – acoustic guitar
- Kevin Savigar – cello, Wurlitzer piano, Hammond B-3 organ, keyboards, Fender Rhodes piano
- David Raven – drums
- Alex Neigher – drums
- Debra Dobkin – percussion
- Howard Willing – assistant engineer
- Kevin Breit – acoustic guitar
- Jim Hanson – bass
- Gail Marowitz – art direction, design
- Al Lay – assistant engineer
- Michael Daks – photography
- Mike Roth – A&R
- Greg Calbi – mastering
- Marc DeSisto – engineer, mixing
- Kevin Dean – assistant engineer
- Erik Gloege – production coordination

== Release history ==
Region	Date	Label	Format
Canada	1998-09-28	Sony	CD
United States	1999-08-24	Columbia	Audio cassette
United States	1999-08-24	Columbia	CD
