= Clear Day =

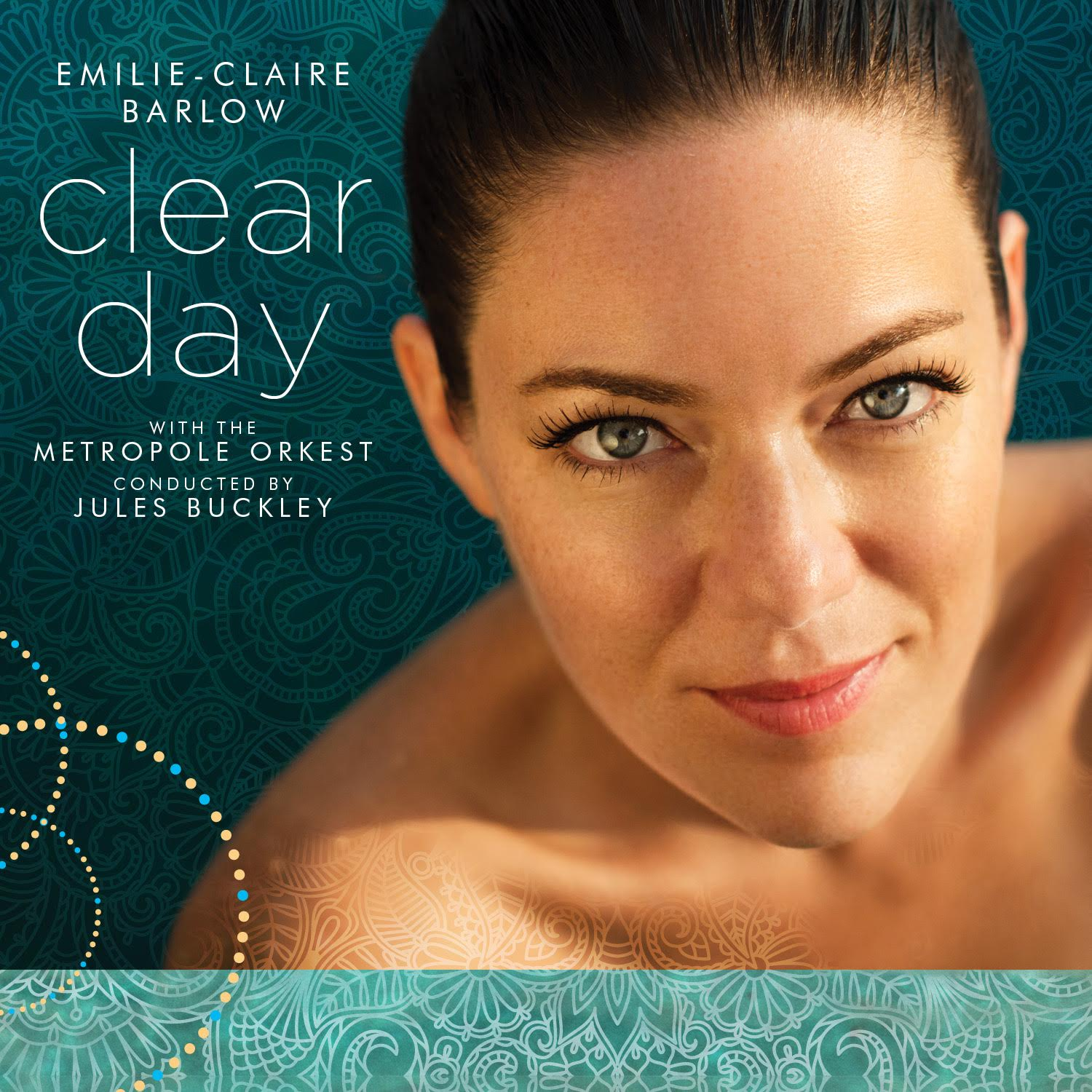

Studio album by Emilie-Claire Barlow with The Metropole Orkest
- Released: October 23, 2015
- Recorded: 2015
- Genre: Jazz
- Length: 66:00
- Label: Empress Music Group
- Producers: Emilie-Claire Barlow, Steve Webster (bassist)

Emilie-Claire Barlow chronology
Live in Tokyo (2014)	Clear Day (2015)	Lumières d'hiver (2017)

Metropole Orkest chronology
Sylva (2015)	Clear Day (2015)	Compleet, Volmaakt, Het Einde (2016)

Clear Day is the 11th album by Canadian jazz vocalist Emilie-Claire Barlow. It features the Dutch jazz and pop orchestra Metropole Orkest conducted by Jules Buckley. It won the Juno Award for Vocal Jazz Album of the Year in 2016.

Clear Day is a "mélange of folk and rock staples" with songs by "artists spanning all genres and time periods, from Brad Mehldau to Coldplay." The album is a narrative with each song telling part of her personal story -- "Each song represents my state of mind, a turning point, a crossroad, ...The important thing was that the song needed to convey that particular moment in time." The record also features a 70-piece Metropole Orkest, expanded from the usual 52 piece line up.

The album was produced and arranged by Barlow and Steve Webster (bassist) with orchestration by the duo as well as three orchestrations by Shelly Berger and two orchestrations by John Metcalfe (composer) arranger for Peter Gabriel's New Blood Orchestra.

== Critical reception ==
Clear Day has been critically acclaimed by reviewers. Canadian music writer Kerry Doole wrote that Barlow's talents "coalesce to stunning effect on Clear Day, the most ambitious offering yet in a prolific discography". The CBC's Melody Lau wrote that Clear Day is "a gamble that pays off when she cleverly pulls a mélange of folk and rock staples into the realm of orchestration." Christophe Rodriguez of Montreal's Sorties Jazz Nights wrote that Barlow "seems to have reached another level" and that "she crafts her albums like a precision watchmaker" Lesley Mitchell-Clarke of theWholeNote wrote "... this recording is a portrait of the artist as a mature women poised at the full apex of her skill, talent, inspiration and power."

== Track listing ==
1. "Amundsen" - (Shelly Berger)
2. "On a Clear Day You Can See Forever" (Burton Lane, Alan Jay Lerner)
3. "Midnight Sun" (Lionel Hampton, Sonny Burke, Johnny Mercer)
4. "Because" (Lennon–McCartney)
5. "Fix You" (Coldplay)
6. "Unrequited" (Brad Mehldau)
7. "Under Pressure" (Queen, David Bowie)
8. "Si j'étais un Homme" (Diane Tell)
9. "It's Just Talk" (Pat Metheny)
10. "Feelin' Groovy" (Simon & Garfunkel)
11. "La Llorona" (Traditional)
12. "I Don't Know Where I Stand" (Joni Mitchell)
13. "Sweet Thing (Van Morrison)"
14. "Mineiro de Coração" (Gord Sheard & Emilie-Claire Barlow)
