= Kobo Town =

Canadian Caribbean musical group

- Kobo Town performing in 2025

Background information
- Origin: Toronto, Ontario, Canada
- Genre: Caribbean music
- Years active: 2004–present
- Members: Drew Gonsalves; Derek Thorne; Cesco Emmanuel; Robert Milicevic; Linsey Wellman; Don Stewart; Jan Morgan; PK Giunta; Terence Woode

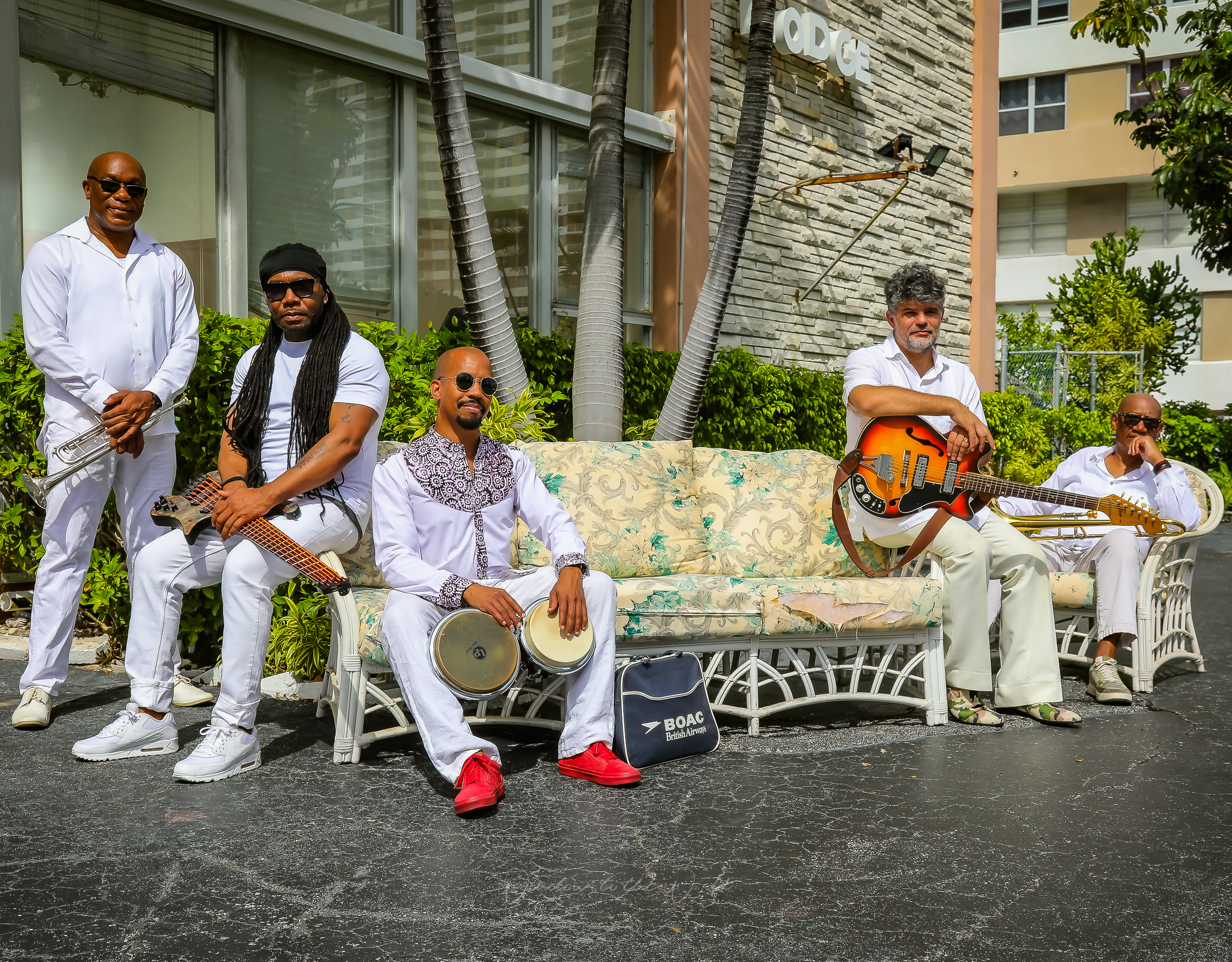
Kobo Town in Florida 2023

Kobo Town is a Juno-winning Canadian Caribbean music group, led by Trinidadian Canadian singer and songwriter Drew Gonsalves. Based in Toronto, Ontario, the band blends calypso music with a diverse mix of Caribbean and other musical influences, including ska, reggae, dub, rapso, zouk, and hip hop.

Other band members include percussionist Derek Thorne, guitarists Cesco Emmanuel and Patrick Giunta, drummer Robert Milicevic, saxophone and flute player Linsey Wellman, bassist Don Stewart, trombonist Terence Woode, and trumpeter Jan Morgan.

== Background ==
Gonsalves was born and raised in Diego Martin, Trinidad and Tobago to a Trinidadian father and a Québécois mother. When he was 13, his parents' marriage ended and his mother left and returned to Canada with her children, settling in Ottawa, Ontario. As a teenager, Gonsalves turned to music and poetry as a way to deal with his sense of dislocation and exile. He later studied history and political science at Carleton University before moving to Toronto in the early 2000s and forming the band in 2004.

Since its founding, the group has toured extensively throughout Europe and North America, and have appeared at festivals in the Caribbean, Asia, and Latin America.

== Music ==
The band released its debut album Independence in 2007. The album was nominated for an Indie and a CFMA award.

The band's second album Jumbie in the Jukebox, released in 2013, was recorded predominantly in Belize. The album was named a longlisted nominee for the 2013 Polaris Music Prize on June 13, 2013. The album was also nominated for a JUNO Award in 2014.

After releasing Jumbie in the Jukebox, Gonsalves collaborated on the writing and production of Calypso Rose's platinum-selling album Far From Home. The album, which features several songs penned by Gonsalves as well as performances by other Kobo Town members, won a Victoire de la Musique award in France in February 2017.

Kobo Town's third release Where the Galleon Sank was released in Canada in February 2017 and won a Canadian Folk Music Award for World Group of the Year at the 13th annual CFMA. The album was named World Music Album of the Year at the 2018 Juno Awards.
