= The First Cut Is the Deepest (album) =

Studio album by Michie Mee
- Released: 2000
- Recorded: 1997–2000
- Genre: Canadian hip hop
- Label: Koch Records
- Producers: Swiff, David Carty, Jon Levine, Newell Martin, The Drew, Shawn Emery, Kwajo Boateng, Alex G, Mr. Murray, Phil Cold, DJ X

Michie Mee chronology
| Jamaican Funk—Canadian Style (1991) | The First Cut Is the Deepest (2000) |

Singles from The First Cut Is the Deepest
- 1. "Don't Wanna Be Your Slave" Released: 1999

The First Cut Is the Deepest is the second studio album by Canadian rapper Michie Mee, released in 2000 on Koch Records. The single "Don't Wanna Be Your Slave", featuring Esthero, was nominated for Best Rap Recording at the 2000 Juno Awards.

== Track listing ==
1. "Interlude: The Album" (featuring Chris Rouse)
2. "Ripped Mee Off"
3. "Don't Wanna Be Your Slave" (featuring Esthero)
4. "Your Daughter"
5. "Time Is Now"
6. "Interlude: Uncle Nigel" (featuring Chris Rouse)
7. "I'm the One"
8. "Interlude: Spice This!" (featuring Kwamster)
9. "Love It or Leave It Alone"
10. "I'll Call You"
11. "Still Here" (featuring Richie Lu)
12. "Fun Surround Dem"
13. "Lady Luck (The Darkside)"
14. "Interlude: Fakin' Jamaican" (featuring Kwamster)
15. "Cut Off (Unclean)"
16. "Interlude: Personal Assistant" (featuring Chris Rouse)
17. "Cover Girl"
18. "Interlude: Said Chuck" (featuring Chuck D)
19. "Free"
20. "Interlude: Outro"
21. "Cut Off (Clean)" (hidden track)

Professional ratings
Review scores
| Source | Rating |
|---|---|
| Jam! | (mixed) |
