= You Are What You Love =

Studio album by Melanie Doane
- Released: 6 May 2003
- Genres: Pop, pop rock
- Labels: Actorboy Records; Warner Music
- Producer: Rick Neigher

Melanie Doane chronology
Melvin Live (2001)	You Are What You Love (2003)	A Thousand Nights (2008)

Singles from You Are What You Love
- 1. "Still Desire You" Released: January 2003; 2. "Wilma or a Betty Man" Released: June 2003; 3. "You Are What You Love" Released: January 2004

You Are What You Love is the third studio album by Juno Award winning Canadian singer-songwriter Melanie Doane. It was first released independently on 14 February 2003, via Melanie's official website and later distributed by Warner Music Canada to retail outlets in Canada on 6 May 2003.

== Track listing ==
1. "Still Desire You" – 4:08
2. "As I Am" – 4:01
3. "Wilma Or A Betty Man" – 3:43
4. "Way Past Blue" – 4:10
5. "First Love" – 2:11
6. "You Are What You Love" – 3:59
7. "You Do The Math" – 4:18
8. "Mayor of Melonville" – 3:06
9. "Temporary" – 2:52
10. "Bionic" – 3:23
11. "Here I Am" – 4:36

== Song placements ==
- Dawson's Creek – "Bionic"
- That's Life – "Way Past Blue", "Still Desire You", "You Are What You Love", "Bionic"
- Prom Queen: The Marc Hall Story (TV Movie) – "You Are What You Love"

== More Information ==
- An alternate mix of "Bionic" appeared previously as a bonus track on Doane's 2001 live album Melvin Live.
