= Return to Love Tour =

2000 concert tour by Diana Ross and the Supremes

- Tour by Diana Ross and the Supremes
- Start date: June 14, 2000
- End date: August 5, 2000
- Legs: 1
- No. of shows: 29 (13 played, 16 cancelled)

Diana Ross and the Supremes concert chronology
- Take Me Higher Tour (1995–96); Return to Love Tour (2000); Live Love Tour (2004)

The Return to Love Tour was a 2000 concert tour by the American singing group Diana Ross and the Supremes.

== Origins ==
In 1999, Diana Ross released her final album on Motown Records, Every Day is a New Day. According to Ross (featured in an interview with Barbara Walters), Scott Sanders, a close friend of Ross', suggested adding an entire Supremes segment to her promotional concert tour for the then-new album in which she would perform full versions of the hits she recorded when she was with the Supremes. The idea soon developed into an entire show of Supremes songs which would reunite Ross with her former singing partners, Mary Wilson and Cindy Birdsong. Ross approached Arthur Fogel, head of concert promotions for TNA/SFX(now Live Nation Entertainment), who, reportedly, agreed to finance the tour.

== Negotiations ==
Talks and plans for the tour were well underway throughout the summer of 1999 as the idea of a Supremes tour was floated around before Mary Wilson was contacted by Diana Ross in December 1999. At this time, Wilson only heard rumors of the tour and had not been contacted by TNA/SFX. Wilson, upset she had been contacted so late, wanted to speak with Ross directly before beginning negotiations with TNA/SFX. Ross felt they should speak after negotiations took place. Following Ross' initial contact, she removed herself from the negotiation process, leaving them between the women, their representatives, and the promoters. TNA/SFX initially offered Wilson $1 million. Cindy Birdsong was reported to have been offered less than $1 million. Tour performance fees are determined by an artist's most recent per-show earnings. Wilson, reportedly, earned roughly $1 million in performance fees the previous year. Wilson and Birdsong were also informed they would have not have any creative input into the show. Wilson rejected the initial offer feeling she, Ross, and Birdsong should be paid equally and have equal input into the show. Promoters increased Wilson's offer up to $2 million after the initial rejection. Ross agreed to offer Wilson an additional $2 million from her personal finances to the $2 million TNA/SFX proposed for a total of $4 million. Wilson and Birdsong's request for creative input into the show was again rejected. Ross stipulated that all of the others artists' fees were guaranteed, meaning that they'd receive the full amount of their contracts, regardless of how many performances actually took place. Wilson erroneously publicly stated that Ross was to receive between $15 and $20 million. Ross, however, as the tour's co-producer, was receiving $500,000 per night from TNA/SFX to cover the tour's expenses. When the expenses exceeded the allotment, Ross covered the overages.

Wilson's final offer of $4 million and Birdsong's offer of $1 million came with a deadline of early 2000 (in order to begin production of the sets, costume fittings, hiring of staff, etc., and an on-schedule commencement of the tour). By this time, Wilson had convinced Birdsong to allow Wilson to negotiate for her, but, no credible information has surfaced stating that Wilson sought to increase Birdsong's offer. Wilson eventually accepted the final offer before the deadline. TNA/SFX accepted her response; however needed to clear it with Ross first. After consulting with Ross, TNA/SFX informed Wilson “the train had left the station” and ceased negotiations with her and Birdsong. Birdsong would later state how mishandled she felt by TNA/SFX. Ross began to question whether to continue to stage the tour. Ross sought advice from Berry Gordy Jr., who had called TNA/SFX during the negotiation process on behalf of Wilson and Birdsong, requesting they receive better pay and have creative input into the show. Gordy reportedly told Ross to continue "if it's something she'd have fun doing" however warned her about continuing without Wilson and Birdsong. Ross decided to continue.

TNA/SFX approached 70's Supremes Jean Terrell, Susaye Greene, Lynda Laurence and Scherrie Payne, the latter two of whom toured as "Former Ladies of the Supremes," about being part of the tour. The ladies were asked to sing for the promoters in Los Angeles to get a sense of how to put the show together. The ladies were led to believe they would all be included in the tour; however this proved to be untrue. Instead, the promoters were seeking which lady would sound best with Ross. Terrell, who replaced Ross as lead singer of the group in 1970, was insulted by being asked to audition and refused to participate. Greene, Laurence, and Payne agreed to audition, however, Greene was passed over. Greene later stated she didn't like the aggressiveness of the promoters and was perplexed by how she was informed by TNA/SFX through an email that she wasn't needed by stating "two Supremes have been cast." TNA/SFX instead chose Payne and Laurence to continue the tour with Ross. Payne publicly stated that when she received the call to perform on the tour, "I did a Holy Ghost dance in my kitchen".

== Tour ==
The tour was promoted by Ross, Laurence, and Payne appearing on "The Today Show", "The Oprah Winfrey Show," and VH1's "Divas 2000: A Tribute To Diana Ross", following the tour's initial press conference held in the Grand Concourse of New York City's Grand Central Station on April 4, 2000.

The tour commenced in June at Philadelphia's Spectrum arena. Bob Mackie designed five costume changes for the ensemble. The show included large video screens, a troupe of dancers, backing singers and a 50-piece orchestra. The tour featured almost every Supremes single recorded between 1964 and 1970 with lesser known singles performed in select cities. Initially running over two hours the tour was shortened after the Detroit date.

Despite selling well in major cities such as New York City, Philadelphia, and Detroit, the tour attracted an average of 4,000–8,000 fans per night in venues that could hold twice the number. TNA/SFX had priced premiere seats at $250 a ticket. This was the price they had originally set for a tour intended for Ross, Wilson, and Birdsong. After Wilson and Birdsong were no longer part of the tour, TNA/SFX did not change ticket prices to accommodate the new lineup. Unhappy with poor ticket sales, especially compared to the high expense of the production, TNA/SFX pressured Ross to cut production costs by downsizing the orchestra, cutting dancers, and crew. Ross refused. Following the sold-out July 6 performance at New York City's Madison Square Garden, TNA/SFX canceled the tour's remaining dates, completing only 13 of the scheduled 29 stops. Ross announced to the press that she was "severely disappointed" in the cancellation.

== Set list ==
1. "Reflections"
2. "Come See About Me"
3. "Back in My Arms Again"
4. "Baby Love"
5. "You Can't Hurry Love"
6. "Love Child"
7. "The Happening"
8. "Love Is Here and Now You're Gone"
9. "My World Is Empty Without You"
10. "I Hear a Symphony"
11. "You Keep Me Hangin' On"
12. "Love Is Like an Itching in My Heart"
13. "Stop! In the Name of Love"
14. "Where Did Our Love Go"
15. "When the Lovelight Starts Shining Through His Eyes" (select shows)
16. "In and Out of Love" (select shows)
17. "Forever Came Today" (select shows)
18. "Nothing But Heartaches" (select shows)
19. "Touch Me in the Morning" (Diana Ross solo)
20. "I'm Coming Out" (Ross solo)
21. "Love Hangover" (Ross solo)
22. "Endless Love" (Ross solo)
23. "Theme from Mahogany (Do You Know Where You're Going To)" (Ross solo)
24. "Ain't No Mountain High Enough" (Ross solo)
25. "Up the Ladder to the Roof" (Lynda Laurence solo - select shows)
26. "Stoned Love" (Scherrie Payne solo - select shows)
27. "Somewhere" (select shows)
28. "Reach Out I'll Be There"
29. "Money"
30. "I Will Survive"

== Tour dates ==
List of 2020 concerts
Date (2020)	City	Country	Venue
June 14	Philadelphia	United States	First Union Spectrum
June 19	Auburn Hills	United States	The Palace of Auburn Hills
June 20	Columbus	United States	Value City Arena
June 22	Atlanta	United States	Philips Arena
June 24	Tampa	United States	Ice Palace
June 25	Sunrise	United States	National Car Rental Center
June 28	Houston	United States	Compaq Center
June 29	Dallas	United States	Reunion Arena
July 1	Rosemont	United States	Allstate Arena
July 3	Montreal	Canada	Molson Centre
July 4	Toronto	Canada	Air Canada Centre
July 6	New York City	United States	Madison Square Garden

=== Canceled concerts ===
List of canceled concerts
Date (2020)	City	Country	Venue
July 7	Wantagh	United States	Jones Beach Theater
July 9	Washington, D.C.	United States	MCI Center
July 10	Pittsburgh	United States	Mellon Arena
July 12	Hartford	United States	Hartford Civic Center
July 13	Boston	United States	FleetCenter
July 14	Atlantic City	United States	Etess Arena
July 16	Milwaukee	United States	Bradley Center
July 17	Cleveland	United States	Gund Arena
July 19	Minneapolis	United States	Target Center
July 21	Denver	United States	Pepsi Center
July 24	Seattle	United States	KeyArena
July 25	Portland	United States	Rose Garden Arena
July 28	San Jose	United States	San Jose Arena
August 2	San Diego	United States	San Diego Sports Arena
August 3	Anaheim	United States	Arrowhead Pond of Anaheim
August 5	Paradise	United States	MGM Grand Garden Arena
