= Seule ce soir =

Studio album by Emilie-Claire Barlow
- Released: October 16, 2012
- Recorded: 2012
- Genre: Jazz
- Length: 56:11
- Label: Empress Music Group
- Producer: Emilie-Claire Barlow

Emilie-Claire Barlow chronology
The Beat Goes On (2010)	Seule ce soir (2012)	Live in Tokyo (2014)

Seule ce soir is an album by Canadian jazz singer Emilie-Claire Barlow. This is the first album on which she sings every song in French. It was released on October 16, 2012. At the 2013 Juno Awards, Seule ce soir won Vocal Jazz Album of the Year. It also won Album of the Year - Jazz Interpretation at the 2013 ADISQ Awards.

== Track listing ==
1. Quand le soleil dit bonjour aux montagnes
2. Petit matin
3. Chez moi
4. Des croissants de soleil
5. C'est si bon
6. Ces bottes sont faites pour marcher
7. La plus belle pour aller danser
8. La belle dame sans regret
9. T'es pas un autre
10. Jardin d'hiver
11. Seule ce soir
12. Les yeux ouverts
13. Comme je crie, comme je chante (with Julie Lamontagne)
14. C'est merveilleux
