= Arthur Fogel =

Arthur Fogel CM
- Born: Ottawa, Ontario, Canada
- Occupations: CEO, Divisional at Live Nation Entertainment
- Website: Official website

Arthur Fogel CM is a Canadian music promoter and the CEO of the Global Touring division of Live Nation Entertainment. His team has managed four of the top five highest-grossing tours in history, including those by U2, Madonna, Lady Gaga, and The Police. He has been considered one of the most important people in live music.

Ottawa, Ontario. He graduated from Ashbury College and obtained a Bachelor of Arts degree from McMaster University.

== Career ==
Fogel relocated to Toronto, where he played drums professionally. His involvement in music promotion commenced after meeting promoter Dennis Ruffo in Ottawa, when Ruffo had booked the Wells-Davidson Band, in which Fogel was the drummer.

Fogel first started in the concert and music promotion business at a Toronto club called The Edge. In 1981, he joined Concert Productions International (CPI) as an executive assistant before being promoted as president of the concert division at CPI in 1986. In 1989, the company's risky North American breakthrough was to win the tour contract for the Rolling Stones, earning a record-breaking $300 million.

In 1995, Fogel became president of The Next Adventure (TNA), a global touring company, and was responsible for the global touring division as the company was acquired first by SFX, then by Clear Channel Communications.

As a promoter and tour manager of some of the world's largest stage scenes, Fogel's rapport with his superstar clients is reportedly enhanced by his own history as a professional musician. He manages egos, saying "I had this sense of how to interact with artists. When to insert myself in their world and when to withdraw." He has actively responded to crises outside of his control. In 2000, his team was prompted to cancel Diana Ross's Return to Love Tour mid-stride, reportedly due to a failure of financial negotiations with artists, high ticket prices, and low attendance. A 2002 Guns N' Roses concert tour was reportedly shaken by promoter Clear Channel Communications's cancellation of multiple concert dates, due to the band's second failure to appear. Described by MTV News as a riot, the event suffered fighting and mayhem amid the audience, and between the audience and the attending riot police.

Fogel is the CEO of the Global Touring division of Live Nation Entertainment and the chairman of its Global Music group. The organization sells almost 50 million tickets to more than 20,000 events every year, and his team has managed four of the top five highest-grossing tours in history, including those by U2, Madonna, Lady Gaga, and The Police.

== Reception ==
Bono of U2 called Fogel "clearly the most important person in the live music world" in a documentary movie titled Who the F**k Is Arthur Fogel, which was screened at the Canadian Music Week Film Fest of 2013. In 2013, The Globe and Mail called him "the most powerful man in music", remarking that "Arthur Fogel runs the world – or at least a large part of the music industry – but doesn't even have his own Wikipedia entry."

In 2016, Fogel was named to the Canadian Music Industry Hall of Fame.

== See also ==
- Madonna: Rebel Heart Tour, The MDNA Tour, Sticky & Sweet Tour, Confessions Tour
- Lady Gaga: The Monster Ball Tour, Born This Way Ball, ArtRave: The Artpop Ball
- U2: U2 360° Tour
- Diana Ross: Return to Love Tour
- The Bamboozle
- List of highest-grossing concert tours
