= A Thousand Nights (album) =

Studio album by Melanie Doane
- Released: 2008
- Recorded: 2007–2008
- Genre: Country rock, folk rock
- Label: Prairie Ocean

Melanie Doane chronology
You Are What You Love (2003)	A Thousand Nights (2008)	The Emerald City (2011)

Singles from A Thousand Nights
- 1. "Songbird featuring Jim Cuddy" Released: June 3, 2008

A Thousand Nights is the fourth studio album by Canadian singer-songwriter Melanie Doane. It was released on July 1, 2008 on her independent label, Prairie Ocean.

A Thousand Nights was re-released in 2009 after a limited copies release in 2008.

== Track listing ==
1. "Every Little Thing"
2. "Songbird" featuring Jim Cuddy
3. "Song of Bernadette"
4. "First Love"
5. "Wildflowers"
6. "Devoted to You" featuring Ron Sexsmith
7. "Chopin Ballad"
8. "All The Diamonds" featuring Emilie-Claire Barlow and Kathryn Rose
9. "Martha" featuring Ted Dykstra
10. "Baby Makes Three"
