= Winter Wonderland (Emilie-Claire Barlow album) =

Studio album by Emilie-Claire Barlow
- Released: November 12, 2007
- Genre: Christmas, jazz
- Label: JVC

Emilie-Claire Barlow chronology
Like a Lover (2005)	Winter Wonderland (2007)	The Very Thought of You (2007)

Winter Wonderland an album by Canadian jazz singer Emilie-Claire Barlow.

== Track listing ==
1. "What Are You Doing New Year's Eve?"
2. "Winter Wonderland"
3. "Sleigh Ride"
4. "Santa Baby"
5. "Christmas Time Is Here"
6. "Baby, It's Cold Outside"
7. "Little Jack Frost"
8. "I've Got My Love to Keep Me Warm"
9. "Let It Snow! Let It Snow! Let It Snow!"
10. "Angels' Lullaby"
11. "(Everybody's Waitin' for) The Man with the Bag"
