= Shakespearean Fish =

Studio album by Melanie Doane
- Released: 1996
- Genre: Folk rock, pop, pop rock
- Label: Sony Music Canada
- Producer: Rob Friedman

Melanie Doane chronology
Harvest Train (1993)	Shakespearean Fish (1996)	Adam's Rib (1998)

Singles from Shakespearean Fish
- 1. "Babe in the Woods"; 2. "Tell You Stories"; 3. "My Sister Sings"

Shakespearean Fish is the 1996 debut studio album by Juno Award winning Canadian singer-songwriter Melanie Doane. The album was praised in the Canadian music press. Doane toured the album across Canada later that year.

"Never Doubt I Love" is inspired by Hamlet's letter to Ophelia, and "Shakespearean Fish", contains lyrics adapted from a poem by W. B. Yeats. "Tell You Stories" features Ed Robertson of the Barenaked Ladies on co-lead vocals.

== Track listing ==
1. "Tell You Stories" – 3:43
2. "All of Sunday" – 3:27
3. "Never Doubt I Love" – 4:10
4. "Forgive Me" – 3:51
5. "Saltwater" – 4:01
6. "Till I Start to Believe" – 3:48
7. "Babe in the Woods" – 4:13
8. "My Sister Sings" – 3:52
9. "God So Loved" – 4:28
10. "Silly Me" – 3:35
11. "Shakespearean Fish" – 2:33
