= Harvest Train =

EP by Melanie Doane
- Released: 1993
- Genre: Folk rock
- Label: Independent
- Producer: Gary Furniss, Ron Searles

Melanie Doane chronology
Harvest Train (1993)	Shakespearean Fish (1996)

Harvest Train is an independent EP by Juno Award winning Canadian singer-songwriter Melanie Doane.

== Track listing ==
1. "She's Like the Swallow"
2. "Harvest Train"
3. "I Pray"
4. "Once He Was Mine"
5. "Sweet 16"
6. "The Zoo Is Closed"
