= Jamaican Funk—Canadian Style =

Studio album by Michie Mee and L.A. Luv
- Released: 1991
- Recorded: 1989–1991
- Genre: Canadian hip hop
- Length: 45:13
- Labels: First Priority Music/Atlantic; 91654
- Producers: King of Chill, Michael "Home-T" Bennet

Michie Mee chronology
Jamaican Funk—Canadian Style (1991)	The First Cut Is the Deepest (2000)

Singles from Jamaican Funk—Canadian Style
- 1. "Jamaican Funk" Released: 1990

Jamaican Funk—Canadian Style is the debut album by Canadian emcee Michie Mee, in collaboration with DJ L.A. Luv, released in 1991. It was released on First Priority/Atlantic Records in the United States, where 60,000 copies were sold. The album, which also featured dancehall reggae music, was nominated for Rap Recording of the Year at the 1992 Juno Awards. The only single, "Jamaican Funk," was released in 1990.

== Critical reception ==
Professional ratings
Review scores
Source	Rating
AllMusic	2/5 stars
Calgary Herald	C−

The Calgary Herald wrote that the duo "marshal some cool rhythmic forces, a light 'n' bright blend of funk and reggae, rap and 'toasting'."

== Track listing ==
1. "Prelude No. 1" – 0:26
2. "Jamaican Funk—Canadian Style" – 3:34
3. "Kotch" (featuring Pinchers) – 3:50
4. "Insecure Luva" – 4:45
5. "Prelude No. 2" – 0:27
6. "If Only They Knew" – 3:53
7. "Prelude No. 3" – 0:16
8. "All-Night Stand" (featuring Shabba Ranks) – 3:49
9. "We've Arrived in America" – 3:21
10. "L.A. Luv de Bout" – 3:38
11. "You're Feisty" – 4:36
12. "A Portion from Up North" – 4:42
13. "Canada Large" – 3:57
  Bonus tracks
14. "Get It Together" – 4:46
15. "Jamaican Funk" – 3:17
