= Raggadeath =

Canadian hip hop/rock group

- Origin: Toronto, Ontario, Canada
- Genres: Reggae rock; rap metal; Ragga hip hop
- Years active: 1995–1997
- Labels: Virgin; EMI; Attic; MCA
- Past members: Walter Sobczak; Stephen Kendall; Koze Kozma; Steve Major; Darren Quinn; Michie Mee; Paul Raven

Raggadeath was a Canadian rock band that enjoyed moderate success in the mid-1990s. The band fused heavy metal with dancehall reggae-style rhythms and vocals.

The band's core members and founders were producer/dj/drummer Stephen Kendall and producer/engineer/bassist/keyboardist Walter Sobczak.

Steve Major played all the guitars on the records. Dean Bentley on drums and Darren Quinn on guitar of Monster Voodoo Machine were added for the live shows. The band utilized a variety of vocalists, most notably rapper Michie Mee. Rapper Koze Kozma was also an early band member, but was deported to the United Kingdom after disappearing for six weeks and then turning up weeks later as a Hare Krishna. All of the band's recordings were produced by Walter Sobczak and Stephen Kendall, and engineered by Walter Sobczak.

The band's biggest Canadian hit was "One Life" in 1995, achieving high rotation on MuchMusic, and being voted Favourite Song in Chart magazine's year-end reader's poll. "One Life" was nominated for Best Alternative Video at the 1995 MuchMusic Video Awards. The 1995 album Why Ask Why, containing the singles "One Life" and "Why Ask Why", was also released by Virgin in several European markets. Due to the band members' other commitments and Kozma's disappearance the album was not supported by a concert tour, with an appearance on the MuchMusic Video Awards in 1995 being the band's only major live performance to support the album.

Raggadeath also achieved moderate international success with its self-titled 1997 album, which featured "Dance with the Devil" and a cover of Eddy Grant's "Electric Avenue". At this time the band undertook its first significant tour. The self-titled 1997 album was licensed by Attic Records to Edel AG in Germany, Roadrunner Records in the Netherlands, and TWA in Australia. None of the band's work was released in the USA.

With their popularity faltering due to popular culture's shift from alternative rock toward electronica in the late 1990s, the band broke up following the 1997 album. Sobczak continued with record engineering/production, later becoming chief engineer at The Studio at Puck's Farm, and Kendall returned to his career as a DJ later DJing at the Swan in England. Major returned to studio work with Toronto's Wellesley Sound studio, while Quinn and Mee continued to collaborate under the band name The Day After.

== Discography ==
- One Life (Maxi-Single, 1995)
- The Family Worship EP (EP, 1995)
- Why Ask Why (Maxi-Single, 1995)
- Why Ask Why (Album, 1995)
- Dance With The Devil (Remixes) (Maxi-Single, 1997)
- Electric Avenue (Maxi-Single, 1997)
- Electric Avenue (Remixes) (Maxi-Single, 1997)
- Raggadeath (Album, 1997)

=== Music videos ===
Year	Song	Album
1995	One Life	Why Ask Why
1995	Why Ask Why	Why Ask Why
1997	Dance With The Devil	Raggadeath
