= Emilie-Claire Barlow =

Canadian singer and voice actress (born 1976)

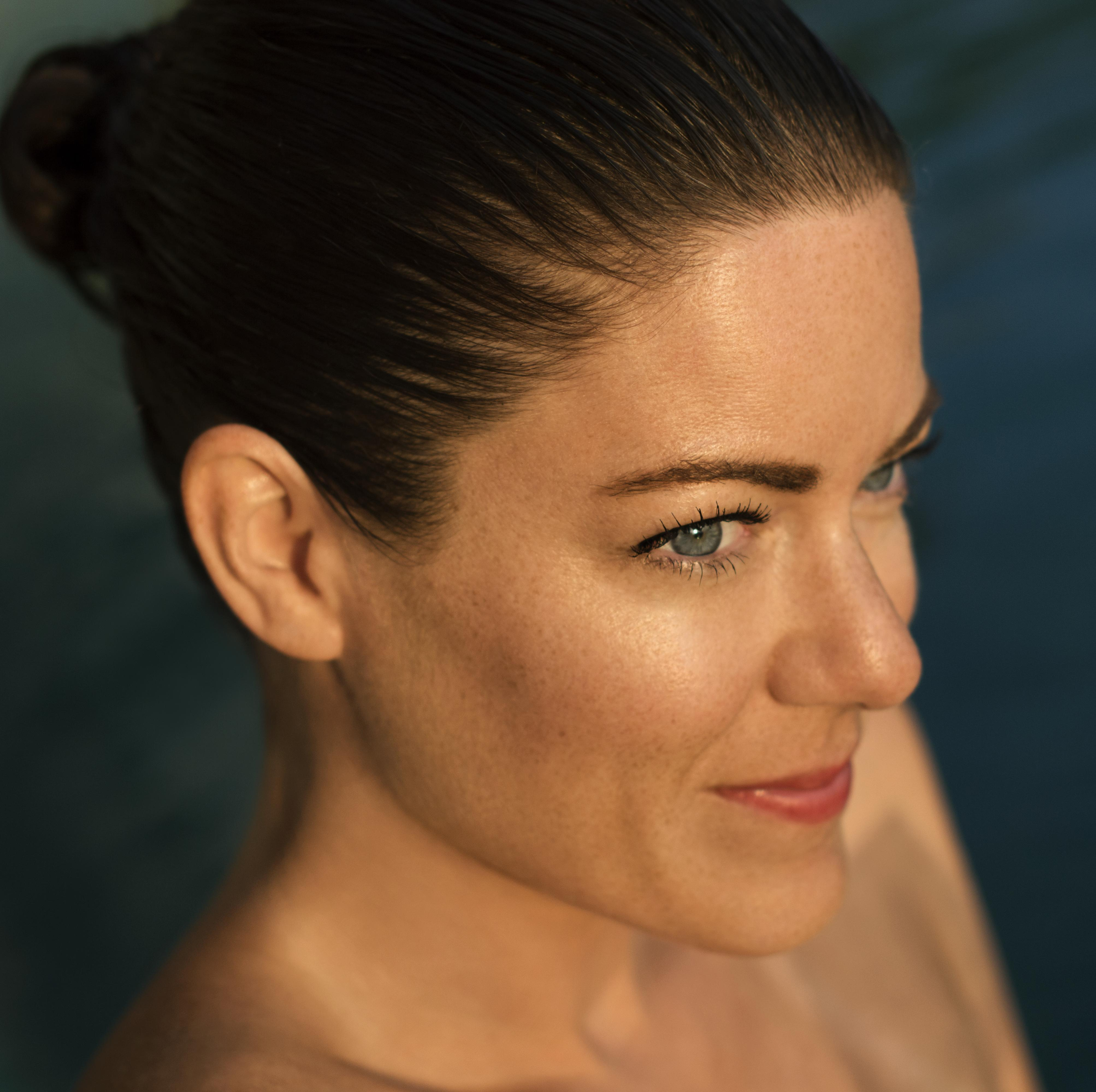
- Barlow in Mexico, December 2014
- Born: June 6, 1976 (age 50); Toronto, Ontario, Canada
- Occupations: Singer; arranger; record producer; voice actress
- Years active: 1992–present
- Known for: Sailor Moon as Voice of Sailor Mars (DIC dub) and Sailor Venus (Cloverway dub)
- Parents: Brian Barlow (father); Judy Tate (mother)
- Musical career
- Genre: Vocal jazz
- Instrument: Vocals
- Label: Empress Music Group
- Website: emilieclairebarlow.com

Emilie-Claire Barlow (born June 6, 1976) is a Canadian singer, arranger, record producer, and voice actress. She has released several albums on her label, Empress Music Group, and has voiced characters for animated television series. She performs in English, French, and Portuguese.

Barlow's first album, Sings, was released in 1998. She has received seven nominations for Canada's Juno Awards with her album Seule ce soir winning for best Jazz Vocal Recording in 2013 and Clear Day winning the same award in 2016. Seule ce soir also won Album of the Year – Jazz Interpretation at the 2013 ADISQ Awards. Barlow was also nominated for the Jack Richardson Producer of the Year Award at the 2016 Juno Awards.

Barlow was named Female Vocalist of the Year at the 2008 National Jazz Awards. She has named influences as Ella Fitzgerald, Tony Bennett, and Stevie Wonder.

Barlow has voiced various characters for animated television series, including Sailor Mars and Sailor Venus in the DiC/Cloverway English dub of Sailor Moon, Courtney, Laurie, and Ellody in the Total Drama series, Alice Gehabich in both the English dubs of Bakugan Battle Brawlers and New Vestroia, Chrissy in 6teen, Mrs. Ridgemount in Stoked, Bunny in Almost Naked Animals, and Theresa Falcone (McDougall) in Fugget About It.

== Early life ==
Born in Toronto to parents who were professional musicians, Barlow grew up in recording studios and by age 7 had begun a career singing television and radio commercials. Barlow's grandfather was ventriloquist Cy Leonard and her stepgrandfather was actor Bob Homme (who played The Friendly Giant). Her father is award-winning jazz drummer Brian Barlow (aka Brian Leonard). Her mother, Judy Tate, is a composer, arranger, and singer. Her uncle was Richard Homme, a Canadian jazz bassist who died on May 6, 2011.

She was encouraged by her parents to sing and study several instruments including piano, cello, clarinet, and violin. Barlow studied voice at the Etobicoke School of Arts and music theory and arranging at Humber College.

== Discography ==
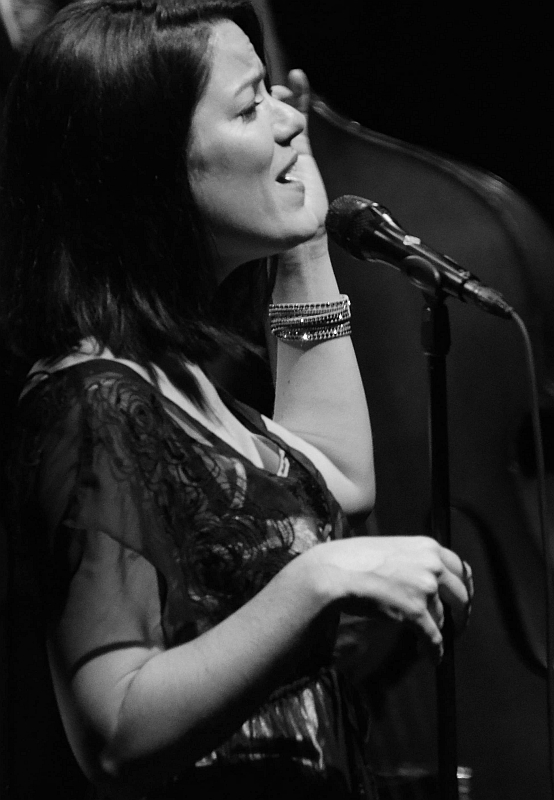
Barlow in 2014

- Sings (Rhythm Tracks, 1998)
- Tribute (Rhythm Tracks, 2001)
- Happy Feet (Rhythm Tracks, 2003)
- Like a Lover (Empress, 2005)
- Winter Wonderland (Empress, 2006)
- The Very Thought of You (Empress, 2007)
- Haven't We Met? (Empress, 2009)
- The Beat Goes On (Empress, 2010)
- Seule ce soir (Empress, 2012)
- Live in Tokyo (eOne, 2014)
- Clear Day (eOne, 2015)
- Lumières d'hiver (Empress, 2017)
- Spark Bird (Empress, 2023)
- La Plus Belle Saison (Empress, 2026)

=== As guest ===
- Peter Appleyard, Sophisticated Ladies, (Linus, 2012)
- Melanie Doane, A Thousand Nights (Prairie Ocean, 2008)
- Matt Dusk, My Funny Valentine: The Chet Baker Songbook (Royal Crown, 2013)
- Amanda Tosoff, Earth Voices (Empress, 2021)
- Dave Weckl and Jay Oliver, Carousel (self-release, 2014)

== Awards ==
Year	Award	Nominated work	Category	Result	Ref.
2002	Juno Awards	Tribute	Vocal Jazz Album of the Year	Nominated	
2008	Juno Awards	The Very Thought of You	Vocal Jazz Album of the Year	Nominated	
2008	National Jazz Awards		Female Vocalist of the Year	Won	
2008	Gemini Awards	Words to Music: Canadian Songwriters Hall of Fame	Best Performance in a Variety Program	Nominated	
2010	Juno Awards	Haven't We Met?	Vocal Jazz Album of the Year	Nominated	
2011	Juno Awards	The Beat Goes On	Vocal Jazz Album of the Year	Nominated	
2011	SiriusXM Independent Album of the Year		Jazz Artist of the Year	Won	
2013	Juno Awards	Seule ce soir	Vocal Jazz Album of the Year	Won	
2013	ADISQ Awards	Seule ce soir	Album of the Year – Jazz Interpretation	Won	
2013	SiriusXM Independent Album of the Year		Jazz Artist of the Year	Won	
2013	ACTRA Awards	Almost Naked Animals – Miss Surrounding Area (Bunny)	Outstanding Performance – Voice	Nominated	
2016	Juno Awards	Clear Day	Vocal Jazz Album of the Year	Won	
2016	Juno Awards	Clear Day	Producer of the Year	Nominated	
2016	ADISQ Awards	Clear Day	Album de l’année – Jazz	Nominated	

== Filmography ==
=== Films ===
Year	Title	Role	Notes
1992	Oh, What a Night	Lorraine	Debut role
1997	Pippi Longstocking	Kids	Singing voice
2012	Z-Baw	Mara (voice)	Main role

=== Television ===
Year	Title	Role	Notes
1994	The Mighty Jungle	Cheryl (voice)	Episode: "Home Alone"
1995–1998, 2000	Sailor Moon (DIC and CWI dubs)	Grace, Sailor Mars (eps. 66–82), Sailor Venus (voice)	91 episodes
1998	Mythic Warriors: Guardians of the Legend	Siren #2 (voice)	Episode: "Ulysses and the Journey Home"
1998–2000	Bad Dog	Penelope Potanski (voice)	
2004–2010	6teen	Chrissy (voice)	15 episodes
2005	Wayside	Johan (voice)	1 episode
2006–2007	Z-Squad	Bernice (voice)	Credited as Emily Claire Barlow
2007	Bakugan Battle Brawlers	Alice Gehabich (voice)	39 episodes
2007–2008	Total Drama Island	Courtney (voice)	16 episodes
2009–2010	Total Drama Action	Courtney (voice)	17 episodes
2009–2010	Bakugan: New Vestroia	Alice Gehabich (voice)	30 episodes
2009–2012	The Amazing Spiez!	Kat (voice)	3 episodes
2009	The Dating Guy	Rachel (voice)/Hot Chick Pot Creature (voice)	1 episode each
2009	Stoked	Mrs. Ridgemount (voice)	11 episodes
2010	Total Drama World Tour	Courtney (voice)	23 episodes
2011–2013	Almost Naked Animals	Bunny (voice)	40 episodes
2011	Skatoony	Courtney (voice)	Episode: "Hoo Loves You, Baby!"
2011	Bakugan: Mechtanium Surge	Chris (voice)	12 episodes
2011	Beyblade: Metal Masters	Lera (voice)	3 episodes
2012–2016	Fugget About It	Theresa Maria Falcone (voice)	39 episodes
2013	Beyblade: Metal Fury	Lera (voice)	1 episode
2013	Total Drama: All-Stars	Courtney (voice)	11 episodes
2014	Cyberchase	Abby (voice)	Episode: "The Cyberchase Movie"
2014–2016	Numb Chucks	Various voices	51 episodes
2015	Total Drama Presents: The Ridonculous Race	Ellody and Laurie (voice)	Ellody (3 episodes), Laurie (5 episodes)
2018–2023	Total DramaRama	Courtney (voice)	91 episodes
2019	The Remarkable Mr. King	Chanelle, Momma Turtle, Jane	
2021–2022	Bread Barbershop	Mini Cake (voice)	3 episodes

Preceded by Katie Griffin	Voice of Sailor Mars; Eps. 65 – 82	Succeeded by Katie Griffin
Preceded by Stephanie Morgenstern	Voice of Sailor Venus; Eps. 83 – 159	Succeeded by Cherami Leigh
