= The Parachute Club =

Canadian band

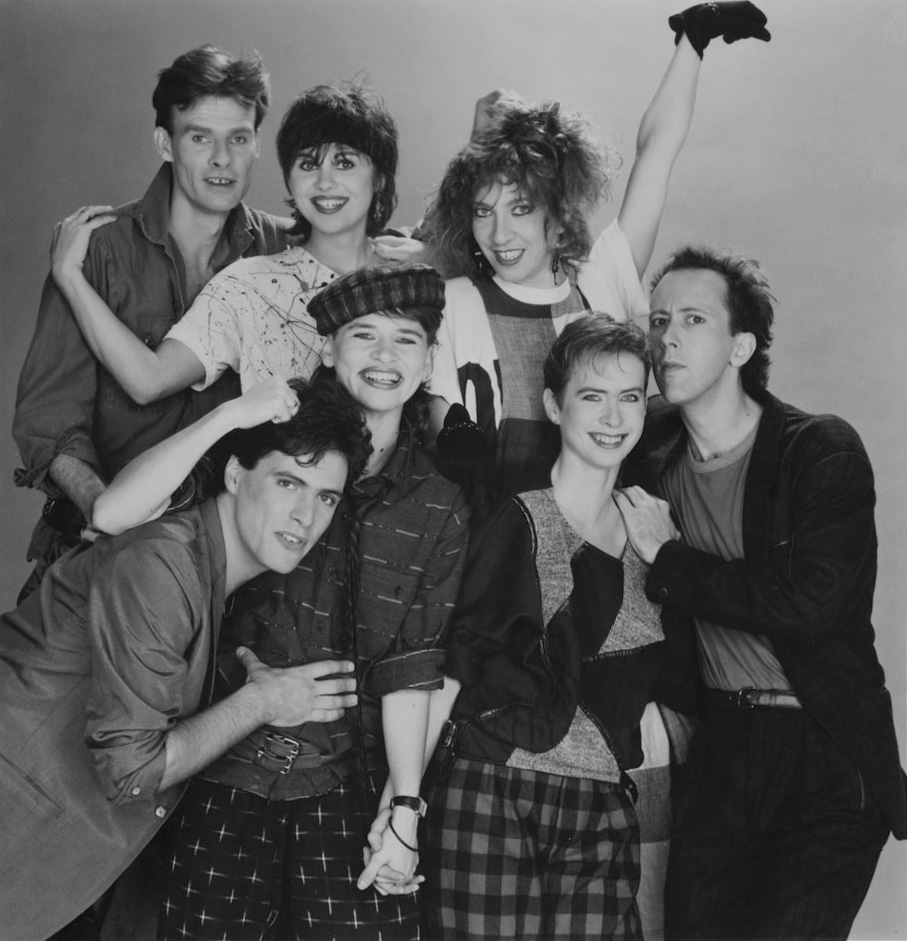
- The Parachute Club, circa 1984

Background information
- Origin: Toronto, Ontario, Canada
- Genres: Pop, new wave, Caribbean
- Years active: 1982–1988, 2005–2008, 2011–2014
- Labels: Current Records, licensed to RCA Records; BMG; EMI International
- Past members: Lorraine Segato; Dave Gray; Lauri Conger; Julie Masi; Steve Webster; Art Avalos; Billy Bryans; Margo Davidson; Keir Brownstone; Rebecca Jenkins; Aaron Davis; Evelyne Datl; Mystic Walsh; Miranda Jackie Walsh; Ashley Wey; Chendy Leon Jr. Glenda del Monte; Rebecca Campbell; Chris Brown; Vicki Randle; Rachel Oldfield
- Website: pclubblog.wordpress.com

The Parachute Club was a Canadian band formed in Toronto in 1982. They released three top 40 hits in Canada between 1983 and 1987, including "Rise Up", "At the Feet of the Moon", and "Love Is Fire" (which featured guest duet vocals from John Oates). The band was known for being one of the first mainstream pop acts in Canada to integrate world music influences, particularly Caribbean styles such as reggae and soca, into their sound.

"The Chutes", as they were known, broke up after touring to promote their third and final album, and played their final gig in the summer of 1988. A reconstituted version of the Parachute Club (including four of the earlier band members) played a number of live shows between 2005 and 2008. The band reunited again in 2011 and remained intermittently active through 2014.

== History ==
=== Formation and early years (1982–1983) ===
The original Parachute Club band consisted of Lorraine Segato on vocals and guitar, Lauri Conger on keyboards and vocals, Billy Bryans on drums, Margo Davidson on saxophone and vocals, Julie Masi on percussion and vocals, Steve Webster on bass, and Dave Gray on guitar. Davidson at the time was one of very few female saxophonists playing professionally; Segato, Conger, and Bryans had previously been associated for several years as the nucleus of Mama Quilla II, a band that gained respect in Toronto in the late 1970s and early 1980s for their integrated musical and sexual politics—elements that would continue with The Parachute Club. Billy Bryans had also been a well-known percussionist and producer in Toronto since the early 1970s, primarily associated with the Downchild Blues Band during this period.

Segato and Bryans first met in 1979, and started to collaborate musically. By 1982, they were both members of the Toronto band V, which was formed while Mama Quilla II was then on hiatus. In the late summer of 1982, Bryans was offered a chance to play at Toronto's inaugural Festival of Festivals, which later evolved into the Toronto International Film Festival. With other members of V unavailable, Bryans approached Segato to form a new one-off band to play at the festival. They added Lauri Conger from Mama Quilla II, as well as local musicians Margo Davidson, Dave Gray and Steve Webster. The band was well received at the festival, and shortly thereafter received and accepted an offer for both a management and recording contract with Current Records. Adding Jule Masi to the ranks, The Parachute Club was thereby formed, while Mama Quilla II made their 'hiatus' permanent and disbanded.

=== Early success (1983–1984) ===
The Parachute Club's eponymous first album, released in 1983, was produced by Daniel Lanois, who had previously been the recording engineer of Mama Quilla II's sole release, an EP released in 1982. The group had to write material for the album rather quickly, and consequently recruited poet/artist Lynne Fernie to assist with some of the lyrics. Though Fernie would never be an official member of The Parachute Club, she would contribute lyrics to all their albums, and function as an unofficial honorary member of the group.

The song "Rise Up", from Parachute Club's first album, won a Canadian Juno Award in 1984 for Single of the Year, while the group won a Juno award for Most Promising Group of The Year.

During 1983, Steve Webster, a co-writer of Parachute Club's best known song, "Rise Up" left the band, to perform with Billy Idol. On their 1983/1984 touring dates, bassist Russ Boswell stepped in for Webster; he would then leave the band to join Corey Hart's backing band. Keir Brownstone, formerly with Bob Segarini, became the band's new permanent bassist in mid-1984.

The band's second album At the Feet of the Moon was released in October 1984, and the title track became the group's second Canadian Top 40 hit. This album (and single) was produced by Michael Beinhorn.

=== Later success (1985–1987) ===
In 1985, the group received the Juno Award for Group of the Year, as well as the equivalent CASBY award. An album of remixed tracks, Moving Thru The Moonlight, was also issued in late 1985.

In 1986, The Parachute Club released their third album, Small Victories. The album included the group's third and final top 40 hit, "Love is Fire", featuring Segato singing a duet with John Oates of Hall & Oates. Oates produced the single, as well as several other Small Victories tracks; The Parachute Club and Mike Jones were credited as producers on the remainder of the album. In 1987, the group's video of their single, "Love Is Fire" received the Juno Award for Video of the Year. Julie Masi left the band after their Canadian tour in support of the album, and was replaced on a session basis for live dates by singer Rebecca Jenkins.

In 1987, the group composed and performed four songs for the Canadian and U.S. versions of the anime series The Wonderful Wizard of Oz. During 1987, Lauri Conger also left the band, and Aaron Davis of Canadian jazz-fusion band Manteca was brought in as the group's new session keyboard player.

=== Winding down (1988–1989) ===
The band (now officially a quintet of Segato, Bryans, Gray, Davidson, and Brownstone) recorded a final non-album single in 1988 ("Big Big World"). Bryans produced; guests included Aaron Davis (keyboards), and vocalists Rebecca Jenkins, Holly Cole, and Micah Davis. The band's final performances were in July 1988 at the Ontario Place Forum in Toronto, where the remaining band members were rejoined by Lauri Conger, filling in for an ill Davis.

In early 1989, the original Parachute Club formally disbanded, with band members going their separate ways. Some members, such as Lorraine Segato and Billy Bryans, continued as professional musicians, while other members, such as Margo Davidson and Lauri Conger, substantially left the music business. Davidson, who died in 2008 at the age of 50, became a creative writer and community activist for the homeless, serving as a director of St. Clare's Multifaith Housing Society and as an outreach worker at Eva's Phoenix.

In 2005, critic Greg Quill wrote in the Toronto Star that "No musical collective bespoke this city during a specific period as powerfully as Parachute Club did in the 1980s. Their infectious, inclusive, soca-soaked dance music carried important messages about the social changes Toronto was experiencing at the time, about sexual and personal politics, about the need for hope and courage in an age of confusing, impersonal rhetoric from local policymakers and world leaders."

=== Advertising controversy (1998) ===
In 1998, the Parachute Club song "Rise Up" was licensed by EMI Music Canada to McCain Foods Limited for a television commercial for self-rising pizza dough. Members of Parachute Club publicly opposed this commercial use of the song. In a news release issued at the commencement of litigation, band members stated that "(a)s a result of its use on the ad...the song, the people who believe in it and the reputation of its creators have suffered damage within the sphere of public credibility and our personal reputations." A settlement resulted in the band members recovering their music rights from EMI.

=== Reunion and band revival (2005–2008, 2011–2014) ===
In 2005, a reconstituted Parachute Club commenced performing, co-headlining a reunion show with Martha and the Muffins and headlining at Toronto's City Roots Festival. The reconstituted band included original members Segato, Bryans, and Gray, as well as Brownstone (who was a member of the band for their second and third albums). Masi, Conger, Steve Webster, and Davidson were not part of this revived line-up. New members of the revived line-up were Mystic Walsh and Miranda Walsh (daughters of Eric Walsh, lead singer of Toronto reggae band Messenjah) on vocals, and Ashley Wey on keyboards. By 2008, these new members had been replaced by Chendy Leon Jr, Glenda del Monte and Rebecca Campbell (although Miranda Walsh subbed for an absent Campbell at one 2008 show).

In 2006, The Parachute Club was inducted into the Canadian Indies Hall of Fame. Founding member Margo Davidson died May 17, 2008, aged 50.

Through 2008, the reconstituted band performed on a regular basis, although they did not release any new material. The Parachute Club did not play any dates after August 2008, and the band's website was not updated after this time. "Rise Up" was given the SOCAN Classic Award in 2000.

Segato performed "Rise Up" at the state funeral of Jack Layton on August 27, 2011, with the choir of the Metropolitan Community Church of Toronto. The Parachute Club reunited again on September 30, 2011, for a free show in Toronto's David Pecaut Square to celebrate their induction to Canada's Walk of Fame. The band line-up for the reunion consisted of original members Lorraine Segato (vocals), Dave Gray (guitar), and Steve Webster with new recruits Chris Brown (keyboards), Art Avalos (drums), and Vicki Randle (percussion, backing vocals). Billy Bryans, too ill to perform for the entire show, did join the band on drums for their last two numbers, including "Rise Up". Bryans, one of three musicians to be part of every Parachute Club line-up, died April 23, 2012, at age 63, following a long battle with cancer.

Partly at Bryans' insistence that the group continue without him, The Parachute Club decided to stay together to perform gigs. During the 2012 Edmonton (Alberta) Folk Music Festival, the band performed on August 11, 2012, at the volunteer after party and at Stage 2 on August 12. They also played at the Niagara Co-op Expo on October 13, 2012, in St. Catharines, Ontario. For these shows, the Parachute Club now included founding members Lorraine Segato, Dave Gray, Julie Masi, Lauri Conger and Steve Webster. Prior to this reunion, Steve Webster had not played with the group for 27 years, Masi for 25 years and Conger for 24 years.

In 2014, the surviving band members released a contemporary dance remix of "Rise Up", in conjunction with Toronto's hosting of the 2014 edition of WorldPride.

Segato resumed her solo career with series of solo shows in 2014 and a new album in January 2015. Though the band has issued no formal announcement concerning their current status, The Parachute Club has been inactive since 2014. In 2018 and 2019, Segato produced two new supergroup versions of "Rise Up", one by various Canadian country musicians credited to The Common Cause Collective, and a pop version credited to The New Parachute Collective. In November 2019, the song "Rise Up" was inducted into the Canadian Songwriter's Hall of Fame. 2023 saw The Parachute Club inducted into Canada's Rock of Fame along with several other notable 1970s and 1980s bands.

== Discography ==
=== Albums ===
- 1983: The Parachute Club Current/RCA - #23 Canada
- 1984: At the Feet of the Moon Current/RCA - #14 Canada / #98 1984 Year End / #54 1985 Year End
- 1985: Moving Thru the Moonlight Current/RCA; remixes
- 1986: Small Victories Current/RCA - #33 Canada
- 1992: Wild Zone: The Essential Parachute Club - BMG; reissued 2006 by EMI International
- 2023: Big World - Sony Music; double vinyl LP compilation

=== Singles ===
Release date	Title	Chart peak	Album
Release date	Title	Canada RPM	Album
July 1983	"Rise Up"	9	The Parachute Club
1983	"Alienation"		The Parachute Club
1984	"Boy's Club"		The Parachute Club
October 1984	"At the Feet of the Moon"	11	At the Feet of the Moon
February 1985	"Act of an Innocent"	61	At the Feet of the Moon
June 1985	"Sexual Intelligence"		At the Feet of the Moon
October 1986	"Love Is Fire"	23	Small Victories
February 1987	"Love and Compassion"	81	Small Victories
May 1987	"Walk to the Rhythm"	90	Small Victories
January 1988	"Big Big World"	88	Non-album single

=== Compilation appearances ===
- 1984: Self Control and Other Smash Club Hits Polydor; "Rise Up"
- 1990: Radio Ffn Powerstation SPV Records; "Innuendo"
- 1996: Party Time, Volume 2: The Ultimate Party Album SPG; "Rise Up"
- 1996: Oh What a Feeling: A Vital Collection of Canadian Music MCA Records; "Rise Up"
- 1998: Hi-NRG Classics: The Definitive 12" Collection Unidisc; "Rise Up"
- 1999: Poptronica Romance Buddha; "Love Is Fire"
- 2000: Party Time SPG; "Rise Up"
