= Michie Mee =

Canadian rapper and actress

- Born: Michelle Ann Camille McCullock; November 1, 1970 (age 55). Kingston, Jamaica
- Origin: Toronto, Ontario, Canada
- Genres: Canadian hip hop
- Occupations: Rapper, songwriter, actress
- Years active: 1985–present
- Labels: First Priority/Atlantic; Koch

Michelle Ann Camille McCullock (born November 1, 1970), better known by her stage name Michie Mee, is a Canadian rapper and actress. Canada's first notable female MC, she is considered a national hip-hop pioneer.

== Early life and career ==
McCullock was born in Kingston, Jamaica, later moving to Toronto, Ontario at a young age, and was raised in the city's Jane Street area, as well as the Jane and Finch neighbourhood. She began performing professionally at age 14. In 1985, during a concert in Toronto, Boogie Down Productions introduced her to the audience and she performed on stage. Michie Mee later teamed up with DJ L.A. Luv (Phillip Gayle) and formed the duo Michie Mee and L.A. Luv. The duo was featured on the 1987 Canadian hip hop compilation Break'n Out, which was produced by KRS-One and Scott La Rock of Boogie Down Productions.

The duo's first single, "Elements of Style", made an impact in the United States, and it signed with First Priority/Atlantic Records in 1988. In the process, Michie Mee became the first Canadian MC to sign a record deal with a major American label. The same year, the duo was featured on the compilation The First Priority Music Family: Basement Flavor, appearing on the tracks "Victory Is Calling" and "On This Mic", which were produced by Howard Hughes & engineered by Walter Sobczak who would several years later ask Michie Mee to record and perform with Raggadeath. "Victory Is Calling" also featured MC Lyte.

In 1990 she collaborated on the one-off single "Can't Repress the Cause" with Dance Appeal, a supergroup of Toronto-area musicians that included Devon, Maestro Fresh Wes, Dream Warriors, B-Kool, Lillian Allen, Eria Fachin, HDV aka 'Pimp of the Microphone', Dionne, Thando Hyman, Carla Marshall, Messenjah, Jillian Mendez, Lorraine Scott, Lorraine Segato, Self Defense, Leroy Sibbles, Zama and Thyron Lee White.

In 1991, the duo released its debut album, Jamaican Funk—Canadian Style, which incorporated dancehall reggae music and spawned the single "Jamaican Funk". Over 60,000 copies of the album were sold in the U.S. and it was nominated for a Juno Award in 1992.

The duo broke up after Michie Mie had an encounter with the police. L.A. Luv later joined the group Dream Warriors.

After starting a solo career and opening shows for artists such as Salt-n-Pepa, Sinéad O'Connor, and Judy Mowatt, she became a founding member of the alternative rock band Raggadeath, which had a Canadian chart hit in 1995 with "One Life". In the late 1990s, Michie Mee began an acting career. She made her first film appearance in 1999's In Too Deep. In 2000, she starred in the CBC Television series Drop the Beat, playing a rapper named Divine. Later that year, she released a comeback album, The First Cut Is the Deepest, which spawned the single "Don't Wanna Be Your Slave" (featuring Esthero). The single earned her another Juno nomination.

In 2001, she formed the band The Day After, which received rotation on MuchLoud.

In 2004, Michie Mee joined a group of local artists (including Maestro, Thrust, and Toya Alexis among others) and formed the Peace Prophets. The group released the charity single "Drop the Chrome" in association with radio station FLOW 93.5. The same year, she appeared in the film My Baby's Daddy. Throughout the remainder of the decade (2005–2009) saw Michie mostly focus on more acting in small films and TV shows, reconnecting with her rock band Raggadeath, whilst still rapping here and there making features on other fellow Canadian artists songs.

In 2009, she released the single "Say About Us".

The 2010s saw Mitchie appear in some small acting roles and some features on other musicians' music

In 2020, marking her 35th year in the business the start of the new decade brought about a long-awaited new album. In November of that year she released her first full-length album and third overall in twenty years, titled Bahdgyal's Revenge. The album had notable features from long-time friend and collaborator Chuck D, and other notable Canadian rappers and Jamaican reggae legends, such as Lindo P.

She performed on the 2021 FreeUp! The Emancipation Day Special.

On December 4, 2024, the Art Gallery of Ontario opened the Inventive and Empowered: The Culture – Hip Hop and Contemporary Art in the 21st Century, an immersive exhibition that welcomed visitors into the world of hip hop through contemporary art and fashion. On December 6, Michie Mee performed as part of the exhibition, which showcased various artists from the Toronto hip hop scene, including a 2000 portrait of Michie Mee by Canadian music photographer Patrick Nichols.

She was featured on a Canada Post stamp in February 2026 as part of its Black History Month collection.

== Discography ==
=== Albums ===
- Jamaican Funk—Canadian Style (1991)
- The First Cut Is the Deepest (2000)
- Bahdgyal's Revenge (2020)

=== Music videos ===
==== with Raggadeath ====
| Year | Song | Album |
|---|---|---|
| 1995 | One Life | Why Ask Why |
| 1995 | Why Ask Why | Why Ask Why |
| 1997 | Dance With The Devil | Raggadeath |

==== with The Day After ====
| Year | Song | Album |
|---|---|---|
| 2001 | Break The Rules | Only the Strong Survive |

==== Solo ====
| Year | Song | Album |
|---|---|---|
| 1990 | Jamaican Funk—Canadian Style | Jamaican Funk—Canadian Style |
| 1998 | Cover Girl | The First Cut Is the Deepest |
| 1999 | Don't Wanna Be Your Slave | The First Cut Is the Deepest |
| 2010 | No Man | |
| 2012 | Bahdgyal Bubble | Bahdgyal's Revenge |
| 2013 | Stand Right Beside Him | Bahdgyal's Revenge |
| 2017 | Thank You | Bahdgyal's Revenge |
| 2021 | Made It | Bahdgyal's Revenge |
| 2021 | What U Talking Bout | Bahdgyal's Revenge |
| 2021 | Willing & Able | Bahdgyal's Revenge |

== Filmography ==
| Year | Title | Role | Notes |
|---|---|---|---|
| 1989 | My Secret Identity | Herself | TV series; 1 episode |
| 1998 | Traders | Herself | TV series; 1 episode |
| 1999 | In Too Deep | Martha | Film |
| 2000 | Drop the Beat | Divine | TV series |
| 2000 | Hendrix | Devon Wilson | TV film |
| 2000 | Love Disease | Herself | Film |
| 2001 | Raisin' Kane: A Rapumentary | Herself | Documentary |
| 2001 | Soul Food | Beverly Gordon | TV series; 1 episode |
| 2001 | SmartAsk | Host | Game show |
| 2002 | Comedian | Other appearance | Documentary |
| 2002 | Our America | N/A | TV film |
| 2004 | Chicks with Sticks | Heather Desmond | TV film |
| 2004 | My Baby's Daddy | Nia's Client | Film |
| 2007–2009 | 'da Kink in My Hair | Tianna | TV series; 2 episodes |
| 2008 | Baby Blues | Charlen Ryan | Film |
| 2014 | Katie Chats | Herself | TV series; 1 episode |

== See also ==
- Canadian hip hop
- Music of Canada
