= Happy Feet (Emilie-Claire Barlow album) =

Studio album by Emilie-Claire Barlow
- Released: 2003
- Recorded: 2003
- Genre: Jazz

Emilie-Claire Barlow chronology
Tribute (2001)	Happy Feet (2003)	Like a Lover (2005)

Happy Feet is the third album by the Canadian jazz singer and actress Emilie-Claire Barlow. It was released in 2003.

== Track listing ==
1. "Gentle Rain"
2. "Freddie Freeloader"
3. "Bem Bom"
4. "I'll Be Around"
5. "Joy Spring"
6. "Bye Bye Blackbird"
7. "It's Only A Paper Moon"
8. "I'm Old Fashioned"
9. "Stompin' At The Savoy"
10. "Smoke Gets In Your Eyes"
11. "Broadway"
12. "Zabumba No Mar"
