= Cariwest =

Annual arts festival in Alberta, Canada

Cariwest is an annual non-profit three-day Caribbean Arts Festival that takes place annually in the second weekend of August in the heart of downtown Edmonton, Alberta. Cariwest and its surrounding events attract more than 60,000 people each year. The festival gives the attendees a chance to enjoy Caribbean culture.

== History ==
Cariwest began in 1984 as part of the Klondike Days Parade (now K-Days) as a way for Caribbean immigrants in Edmonton to celebrate and share their culture. It was organized by The Western Carnival Development Association (W.C.D.A.), a non-profit organization under the Societies Act, and this group has been organizing Cariwest Caribbean Arts Festival since then.

== Activities ==
Cariwest employs the talents of musicians and dancers from all over the world to bring the melodies of Soca, Steel Pan, Reggae, Hip Hop, Calypso and Brass Bands to Edmontonians. There is also drama and street theatre. Cariwest provides an opportunity for those who are unfamiliar with Caribbean culture to experience the traditions. The festival is free and open to all who chose to attend; there is an entrance fee to some special events.

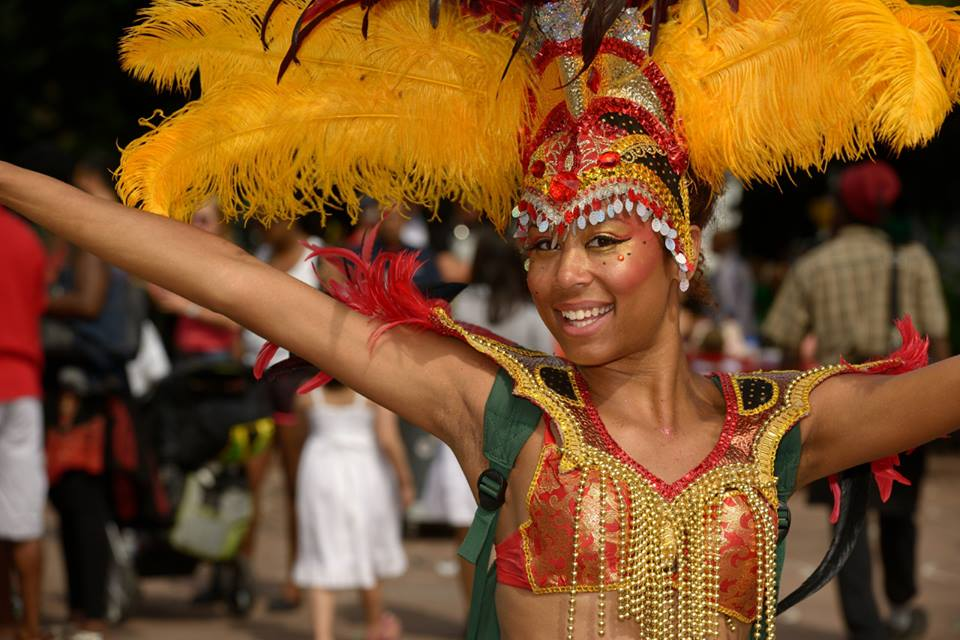
Cariwest Parade 2013

The "mas" in "mas band" is short for masquerade. Carnival mas bands originated in Trinidad and Tobago and are equivalent to the North American parade "floats". Every year, Cariwest hosts a parade in downtown Edmonton where the streets are filled with people in colourful costumes dancing to the beat of Caribbean music. After the parade, Edmonton's Sir Winston Churchill Square is transformed into a Caribbean Village. In the village there is Caribbean food, goods, beer gardens, and live music on the Cariwest stage.
