= Lauri Conger =

- Origin: Thunder Bay, Ontario, Canada
- Genres: Pop, dance
- Occupations: Songwriter, keyboardist
- Instrument: Keyboard
- Years active: 1970s–1988
- Formerly of: The Parachute Club

Lauri Conger is notable primarily as the keyboardist and one of the principal co-writers of most of the songs of The Parachute Club.

== History ==
Conger is a native of Thunder Bay, Ontario, where she began her professional music career in the 1970s. She received early piano and dance training in Port Arthur, Ontario, prior to its merger into Thunder Bay, and was a graduate of Hillcrest High School.

Conger moved to Toronto, where she and Lorraine Segato were members of Mama Quilla II. In 1982, Conger and Segato, along with percussionist Billy Bryans, formed the nucleus of what would become The Parachute Club. Concurrently, in the early 1980s, Conger was developing a reputation as a solo and duo performer on the Canadian folk music circuit.

Conger and Lorraine Segato, together with other band members and lyricist Lynne Fernie, wrote of most of the group's songs, including the song for which the group is best known, "Rise Up".

Conger was a band member during the production of its three albums, released between 1983 and 1986, but left the group in mid-1987. Her final performance was before the Duke and Duchess of York in Toronto. She then trained in Santa Fe, New Mexico to become a registered massage therapist. She rejoined the band in July, 1988, for what would be its final performances at Toronto's Ontario Place.

Following her departure from the group and despite her significant contributions to music, Conger did not continue in a prominent role as a professional musician or songwriter.

== Discography ==
=== Singles (Parachute Club) ===
Release date	Title	Chart peak	Album
Release date	Title	Canada RPM	Album
July 1983	"Rise Up"	9	The Parachute Club
1983	"Alienation"		The Parachute Club
1984	"Boy's Club"		The Parachute Club
October 1984	"At The Feet Of The Moon"	11	At The Feet of the Moon
February 1985	"Act Of An Innocent"	61	At The Feet of the Moon
June 1985	"Sexual Intelligence"		At The Feet of the Moon
October 1986	"Love Is Fire"	24	Small Victories
February 1987	"Love And Compassion"	81	Small Victories
May 1987	"Walk To The Rhythm"	90	Small Victories

=== Albums ===
==== With Mama Quilla II ====
- 1982 KKK//Mama Quilla/Angry Young Woman Tupperwaros; EP.

==== With The Parachute Club ====
- 1983 The Parachute Club Current/RCA
- 1984 At The Feet of the Moon Current/RCA
- 1985 Moving Thru the Moonlight Current/RCA; remixes
- 1986 Small Victories (1986) Current/RCA
- 1992 Wild Zone: The Essential Parachute Club BMG; reissued 2006 by EMI International

==== With Other Artists ====
- 1980 Heather Bishop, Celebration
- 1980 Rodney Brown, When The Bay Turns Blue
- 1981 Mendelson Joe, Let's Party
- 1982 Heather Bishop, Bellybutton (Children's Album)
- 1982 Heather Bishop, I Love Women Who Laugh
- 1985 Soundtrack (with Michael Beinhorn), Dark Lullabies (Director: Irene Angelico and Abbey Jack Neidik) (National Film Board of Canada)
- 1986 Lillian Allen, Revolutionary Tea Party
- 1988 Lillian Allen, Conditions Critical
- 1988 Soundtrack, Calling The Shots, being profile of Jeanne Moreau (Director: Janis Cole and Holly Dale)
- 1988 Soundtrack, Mile Zero: The SAGE Tour (Director: Bonnie Sherr Klein) (National Film Board of Canada)
