= Gwen Stefani – Just a Girl =

Concert residency by Gwen Stefani

- Residency by Gwen Stefani
- Promotional poster for the residency
- Location: Paradise, Nevada, U.S.
- Venue: Zappos Theater
- Start date: June 27, 2018
- End date: November 6, 2021
- Legs: 7
- No. of shows: 57
- Attendance: 201,341
- Box office: $27,301,548

Gwen Stefani concert chronology
- This Is What the Truth Feels Like Tour (2016); Gwen Stefani – Just a Girl (2018–2021)

Gwen Stefani – Just a Girl was a concert residency held at the Zappos Theater on the Las Vegas Strip in Paradise, Nevada by American singer Gwen Stefani. Named after the song of the same name, the residency opened on June 27, 2018, and concluded on November 6, 2021. Comprising fifty-seven dates, Just a Girl grossed over $27.3 million and was attended by 201,341 fans.

== Background ==
The residency was officially announced on April 10, 2018. Tickets for the initial twenty-five shows between June 2018 and March 2019 went on sale on April 13. On December 3, 2018, twenty-one dates between July 5 and November 2, 2019, were announced. The July 24, 2019, was cancelled due to illness.

Twenty-three more dates for 2020 were added, but four were cancelled due to illness. After returning to stage, Stefani only performing three shows, before the remaining eight were postponed to 2021, due to the COVID-19 pandemic.

== Set list ==
This set list was obtained from the concert on June 27, 2018. It does not represent all shows for the duration of the residency.

1. "Hollaback Girl"
2. "Bathwater"
3. "Baby Don't Lie"
4. "It's My Life"
5. "Spiderwebs"
6. "Sunday Morning"
7. "Underneath It All"
8. "The Tide is High"
9. "Ex-Girlfriend"
10. "Hella Good"
11. "Let Me Blow Ya Mind" (interlude) (contains elements of "Harajuku Girls")
12. "Wind It Up"
13. "Rich Girl"
14. "Cool"
15. "Luxurious"
16. "Umbrella"
17. "What You Waiting For?"
18. "Early Winter" (interlude)
19. "Simple Kind of Life"
20. "Used to Love You"
21. "Misery"
22. "Don't Speak"

Encore

23. "Make Me Like You"
24. "Hey Baby"
25. "Just a Girl"
26. "The Sweet Escape"

Notes

- "Simple Kind of Life" was cut from the setlist on July 3, 2018.
- "Nobody but You" was performed on February 15 and 19, 2020.

== Shows ==
List of performances
Date	Attendance	Revenue
Leg 1
June 27, 2018	40,514 / 48,147	$5,552,746
June 29, 2018	40,514 / 48,147	$5,552,746
June 30, 2018	40,514 / 48,147	$5,552,746
July 3, 2018	40,514 / 48,147	$5,552,746
July 6, 2018	40,514 / 48,147	$5,552,746
July 7, 2018	40,514 / 48,147	$5,552,746
July 11, 2018	40,514 / 48,147	$5,552,746
July 13, 2018	40,514 / 48,147	$5,552,746
July 14, 2018	40,514 / 48,147	$5,552,746
July 18, 2018	40,514 / 48,147	$5,552,746
July 20, 2018	40,514 / 48,147	$5,552,746
July 21, 2018	40,514 / 48,147	$5,552,746
Leg 2
December 27, 2018	14,768 / 17,200	$2,836,180
December 29, 2018	14,768 / 17,200	$2,836,180
December 30, 2018	14,768 / 17,200	$2,836,180
December 31, 2018	14,768 / 17,200	$2,836,180
Leg 3
February 27, 2019	33,412 / 38,547	$5,365,897
March 1, 2019	33,412 / 38,547	$5,365,897
March 2, 2019	33,412 / 38,547	$5,365,897
March 6, 2019	33,412 / 38,547	$5,365,897
March 8, 2019	33,412 / 38,547	$5,365,897
March 9, 2019	33,412 / 38,547	$5,365,897
March 13, 2019	33,412 / 38,547	$5,365,897
March 15, 2019	33,412 / 38,547	$5,365,897
March 16, 2019	33,412 / 38,547	$5,365,897
Leg 4
July 5, 2019	27,672 / 35,176	$3,111,133
July 6, 2019	27,672 / 35,176	$3,111,133
July 10, 2019	27,672 / 35,176	$3,111,133
July 12, 2019	27,672 / 35,176	$3,111,133
July 13, 2019	27,672 / 35,176	$3,111,133
July 17, 2019	27,672 / 35,176	$3,111,133
July 19, 2019	27,672 / 35,176	$3,111,133
July 20, 2019	27,672 / 35,176	$3,111,133
July 26, 2019	27,672 / 35,176	$3,111,133
Leg 5
October 11, 2019	37,891 / 42,532	$4,604,279
October 12, 2019	37,891 / 42,532	$4,604,279
October 16, 2019	37,891 / 42,532	$4,604,279
October 18, 2019	37,891 / 42,532	$4,604,279
October 19, 2019	37,891 / 42,532	$4,604,279
October 23, 2019	37,891 / 42,532	$4,604,279
October 25, 2019	37,891 / 42,532	$4,604,279
October 26, 2019	37,891 / 42,532	$4,604,279
October 30, 2019	37,891 / 42,532	$4,604,279
November 1, 2019	37,891 / 42,532	$4,604,279
November 2, 2019	37,891 / 42,532	$4,604,279
Leg 6
February 15, 2020	15,495 / 15,495	$1,751,879
February 19, 2020	15,495 / 15,495	$1,751,879
February 21, 2020	15,495 / 15,495	$1,751,879
February 22, 2020	15,495 / 15,495	$1,751,879
Leg 7 (Note: Originally scheduled to take place in May 2020, but was postponed due to the COVID-19 pandemic.)
October 22, 2021	31,589 / 31,589	$4,079,434
October 23, 2021	31,589 / 31,589	$4,079,434
October 27, 2021	31,589 / 31,589	$4,079,434
October 29, 2021	31,589 / 31,589	$4,079,434
October 30, 2021	31,589 / 31,589	$4,079,434
November 3, 2021	31,589 / 31,589	$4,079,434
November 5, 2021	31,589 / 31,589	$4,079,434
November 6, 2021	31,589 / 31,589	$4,079,434
Total	201,341 / 228,686 (88%)	$27,301,548

== Cancelled shows ==
List of cancelled performances
Date	Reason for cancellation
July 24, 2019	Illness
February 7, 2020	Illness
February 8, 2020	Illness
February 12, 2020	Illness
February 14, 2020	Illness
