= Rare (Gwen Stefani song) =

Song by Gwen Stefani

from the album This Is What the Truth Feels Like
- Released: March 18, 2016
- Recorded: 2015–16
- Studio: Ameraycan Recording Studios (North Hollywood, California); Echo Studio (Los Angeles, California)
- Genre: Electropop; folk pop
- Length: 3:55
- Label: Interscope
- Songwriters: Gwen Stefani; Justin Tranter; Julia Michaels; Greg Kurstin
- Producer: Greg Kurstin

"Rare" is a song recorded by American singer and songwriter Gwen Stefani from her third studio album, This Is What the Truth Feels Like, which was released on March 18, 2016, by Interscope Records. The album's closing track, it was written by Stefani, Justin Tranter, Julia Michaels, and its producer Greg Kurstin.

"Rare" is an electropop and folk pop song that discusses finding love when all hope was lost. Several media outlets speculated that it was written about Stefani's boyfriend Blake Shelton and his ex-wife Miranda Lambert. "Rare" received generally favorable reviews from music critics, some of which called the song "glamorous" and conjectured that it would become a "summer hit".

== Background ==
"Rare"
Gwen Stefani singing in vibrato during "Rare"

In 2013, following Stefani's work with No Doubt, she enlisted the help of Greg Kurstin to write and produce songs for her upcoming third studio album. After Stefani's 2014 single releases, "Baby Don't Lie" and "Spark the Fire", received mixed responses, she scrapped all of her completed material for the opportunity to start fresh. A year later, Stefani enlisted other potential collaborators, like Justin Tranter and Julia Michaels, for work on the album shortly after she announced her divorce from Gavin Rossdale. Stefani later revealed that during the writing of several songs, including "Rare", she and Michaels had taken "stream-of-conscious" lyrics from her computer and fit them into melodies.

"Rare" was written by Stefani, Justin Tranter, Julia Michaels, and Greg Kurstin; Kurstin serves as the track's sole producer. The track was mixed by Serban Ghenea, with John Hanes and Phil Seaford serving as assistant mixing engineers; Julian Burg and Alex Pasco were in charge of recording, with Stephen Felix serving as an assistant recorder. "Rare" became available for purchase on March 18, along with the rest of This Is What the Truth Feels Like.

Blake Shelton, Stefani's boyfriend, declared on Twitter that "Rare" was his favorite song on This Is What the Truth Feels Like, to which Stefani tweeted back "Wonder who that one is about?", alluding to the fact that it was written about him. Several of the songs on This Is What the Truth Feels Like were written about Shelton, including the "Rare" and the album's second single, "Make Me Like You"; even though her writing sessions began with lyrics revolving her breakup with Rossdale, the songs slowly became centered on her newly found relationship with Shelton.

== Composition and lyrics ==
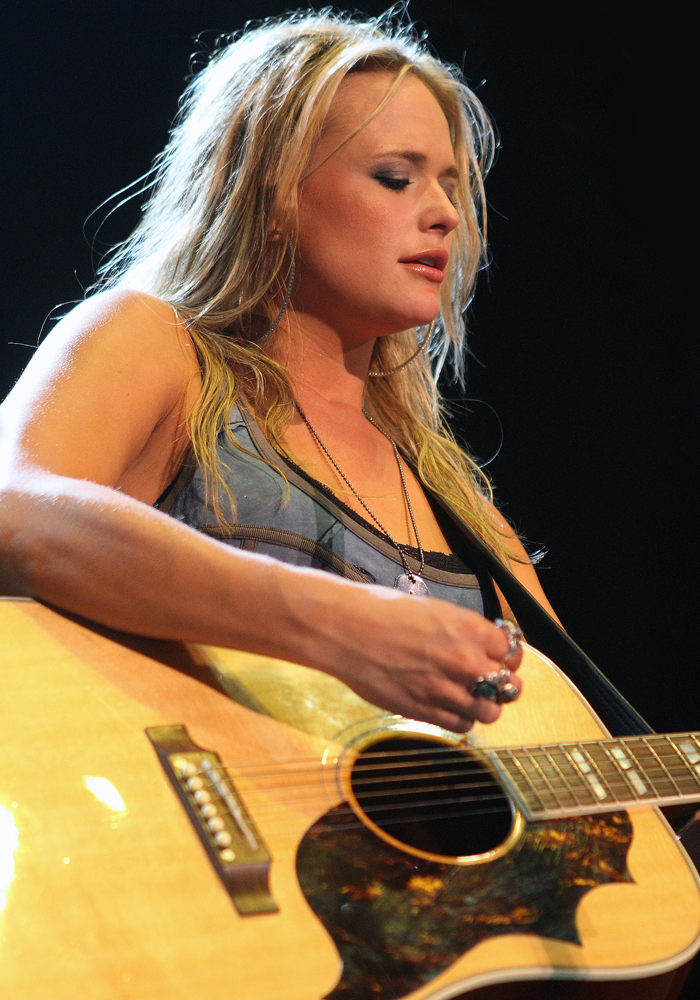
"Rare" includes lyrics reportedly written about Blake Shelton's ex-wife, Miranda Lambert.

Musically, "Rare" is an electropop and folk pop influenced ballad, that has "an acoustic guitar and galloping beat". Lyrically, "Rare" discusses finding love in the "perfect" man, presumably Shelton. Patrick Ryan of USA Today called "Rare" an "outright declaration of love for Shelton", summarizing the song as "a rare moment of vulnerability for the singer who, for the most part, keeps her emotions close to her vest." Leah Greenblatt of Entertainment Weekly declared the song a "sweetly smitten confessional". Mikael Wood of the Los Angeles Times described the lyrics as "her shock to have found someone this late in the game", while Sarah Rodman of The Boston Globe felt that the lyrics observe "that 'only a stupid girl' would let the 'perfect' man go."

After the release of This Is What the Truth Feels Like, several news outlets speculated that the lyrics of "Rare" may be written about Shelton's ex-wife, Miranda Lambert. An article from Fox News reported that "the lyrics appear to be a slam at Lambert for letting Shelton go", particularly "You're rare / And only a stupid girl would let it go". Andrew Leung of Music Mic, who described the song as "a mid-tempo love ballad", also thought that the same lyrics pointed towards Lambert. Lauren DuBois of EnStars stated that "the song seems to allege that [Lambert] was the one who walked away from the relationship she had with Shelton, not the other way around." Gossip website Hollywoodlife.com stated that in the song, Stefani praises Shelton but "totally disses Lambert".

== Critical reception ==
"Rare" received generally favorable reviews from contemporary music critics. Mikael Wood of the Los Angeles Times enjoyed the closing track, calling it "tender". Leah Greenblatt, writing for Entertainment Weekly, said that Stefani "sound[s] like the world's most glamorous high school sophomore, passing mash notes after study hall." USA Today's Patrick Ryan praised "Rare" and declared the track "one dance remix away from being a certifiable summer smash." Stephen Sears of Idolator called the track "elegant and even-keeled" and said Stefani "[will] buck modern radio" with "Rare". Spencer Kornhaber of The Atlantic praised the song and called it an "album-closing ode to joy", further stating the track "uses its star's distinctive voice for moments of multi-tracked beauty or play; often there's a lovely sensation of floating upwards." As the album's closing track, Nicholaus James Jodlowski of Reporter appreciated the "vulnerable side of Stefani" and noted how it slows the album's pace down. However, Chuck Campbell of Go Knoxville gave the song a negative review, describing Stefani's vocals as "a pale facsimile of Ariana Grande".

== Live performances ==
"Rare" was selected by Stefani for inclusion at her This Is What the Truth Feels Like Tour (2016). The song was included during Act 3 of the concert series, immediately following a performance of No Doubt's "Hella Good". On the opening night of the tour on July 12 at the Xfinity Center in Mansfield, Massachusetts, the show was broadcast live through a feed generated by Live Nation Entertainment and Yahoo! Music. It was accompanied with "bumptious hip hop beats", alongside the singer wearing a green corset designed by The Blonds, in addition to Mariel Haenn and Rob Zangardi.

== Credits and personnel ==
Management

- Recorded at Ameraycan Recording Studios, North Hollywood, California; and Echo Studio, Los Angeles, California

Personnel

- Gwen Stefani – lead vocals, songwriting
- Julian Burg – recording
- Stephen Felix – assistant recording
- Serban Ghenea – mixing
- John Hanes – mixing engineer
- Greg Kurstin – production, bass, drums, guitar, keyboards
- Julia Michaels – songwriting
- Alex Pasco – recording
- Phil Seaford – assistant mixing engineer
- Justin Tranter – songwriting

Credits adapted from the liner notes of This Is What the Truth Feels Like
