= Asking 4 It =

Song by Gwen Stefani featuring Fetty Wap

from the album This Is What the Truth Feels Like
- Released: March 18, 2016
- Recorded: 2015–16
- Studio: Westlake Recording Studios (Los Angeles, California); The Hide Out Studios (London, England)
- Genre: Hip hop; trap
- Length: 3:30
- Label: Interscope
- Songwriters: Gwen Stefani; Justin Tranter; Julia Michaels; Tor Hermansen; Mikkel Eriksen; Willie Maxwell II
- Producers: Stargate; Tim Blacksmith (add.); Danny D (add.)

"Asking 4 It" is a song by American singer and songwriter Gwen Stefani from her third studio album, This Is What the Truth Feels Like (2016). The song features guest vocals from American rapper Fetty Wap. It was released on March 18, 2016, as the ninth track on This Is What the Truth Feels Like by Interscope Records. The track was written by Stefani, Justin Tranter, Julia Michaels, Tor Hermansen, Mikkel Eriksen, and Fetty Wap. The track's production was handled by Stargate, while additional production was made by Tim Blacksmith and Danny D.

Musically, "Asking 4 It" is a hip hop and trap influenced track, made clear especially in Fetty Wap's rap verse. Lyrically, the song discusses someone's doubts while in a relationship, presumably Stefani referring to her recent divorce from husband Gavin Rossdale. Upon release, "Asking 4 It" received mixed reviews from music critics. Some critics labeled the song as "trippy" and a "club stomper", while others called it "dated" and questioned its "awkward" placement on the album. The track was included on the set list for her 2016 concert series This Is What the Truth Feels Like Tour.

== Background and release ==
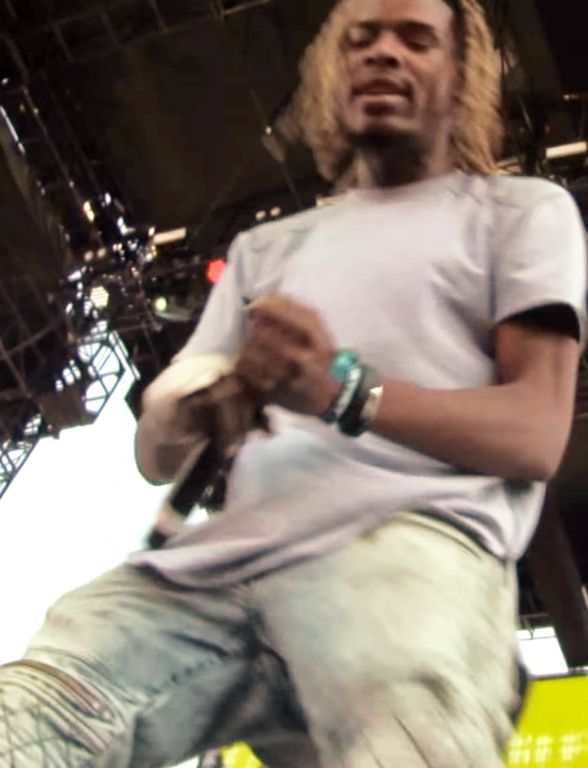
Fetty Wap (pictured) contributed a rapped verse to "Asking 4 It".

Shortly after the lukewarm response to singles "Baby Don't Lie" and "Spark the Fire", Stefani scrapped any material worked on for her then upcoming third studio album. Stefani's record label, Interscope Records, approached her to consider the idea of working with new songwriters and producers, such as Julia Michaels and Justin Tranter, to which she agreed. During her recording sessions with Michaels and Tranter, Stefani became interested in working with new collaborators. In an interview with Entertainment Weekly, Stefani felt that Fetty Wap had "a voice with so much character", so she subsequently told her team that she wanted to collaborate with him. In the same interview, Stefani stated she was surprised the collaboration even happened due to scheduling conflicts concerning Fetty Wap:

It was tough getting him into the studio, though. They got me [studio] dates, and then I was like, 'I'm working with Fetty this week!' Then I went in, and nope, he doesn't show. Day Two and nope, he doesn't show. Day Three and nope, he doesn't show. I wrote a song for us while I was in the studio and I sent it to him, and nope, no response. It was a miracle it happened.

"Asking 4 It" was written by Stefani, Justin Tranter, Julia Michaels, Tor Hermansen, Mikkel Eriksen, and Fetty Wap. It was produced by Stargate, while additional production was handled by Tim Blacksmith and Danny D. The track was mixed by Mark "Spike" Stent, while Mike Anderson and Miles Walker handled recording and tracking. Fetty Wap is the only featured artist on the album. On February 12, 2016, This Is What the Truth Feels Like became available for pre-order on iTunes Store. Nearly a month later, "Asking 4 It" became available for purchase on March 18, along with the rest of the album.

== Composition and lyrics ==
"Asking 4 It"
Stefani introduces Fetty Wap's rap verse in the trap-inspired "Asking 4 It"

"Asking 4 It" has been described as a hip hop and trap song, backed by a rapped verse by Fetty Wap, with a length of three minutes and thirty seconds. A writer for Hitsync described "Asking 4 It" as a "bopping, hip hop tinged beat flecked with dancey synths." Chris Mench of Complex described the inclusion of Fetty Wap as Stefani "call[ing] upon one modern-day hit maker", while Clara Hudson of The Daily Free Press called this move "gimmicky". Lyrically, "Asking 4 It" discusses several topics, including a lover's doubts while in a relationship; Stefani sings "You're giving me truth and it's such an unfamiliar subject", which ET Online described as "a sultry take on the uncertainty of a new romance."

The song was inspired by her divorce from Bush lead singer, Gavin Rossdale; Stefani wrote several songs during these recording sessions to start "a new chapter in her life". In an interview with Today's Matt Lauer, Stefani stated that the majority of her recent studio work would discuss her breakup with Rossdale. Billboard stated that the lyrics "Are you sure you wanna love me? / I know that it's a lot to handle me / But it is what it is / It's all part of my broken history" were "ultra personal". In his description of the track, Glenn Gamboa of Newsday stated that "'Asking 4 It' strikes at the heart of pop radio" while Jillian Mapes of Pitchfork Media described "Asking 4 It" as "the album's sole feature atop an unconvincing beat." Nicholaus James Jodlowski of Reporter felt that the album's "sound cools down a little", but that the track "is still easy to dance to".

== Critical reception ==
Stefani performing "Asking 4 It" during the This Is What the Truth Feels Like Tour in 2016.

Upon release, "Asking 4 It" received generally mixed reviews from contemporary music critics. In a highly positive review, Leonie Cooper of NME praised Stefani for her "nonchalant divorcée swagger" on the track, later calling "Asking 4 It" a standout track on the album. Similarly, Mesfin Fekadu of The Washington Post called the track a "high point". Mikael Wood of the Los Angeles Times favored the track, labeling it as "trippy". Writing for Entertainment Weekly, Leah Greenblatt dubbed "Asking 4 It" as a "come-on disguised as [a] caution"; Greenblatt further praised the song for being a "stomper".

In a negative review of "Asking 4 It", Sal Cinquemani of Slant Magazine called the track "dated" and "no more worthy of Stefani's emotional exorcism than 2014's stale 'Spark the Fire'". Emily Blake of Mashable thought that "Asking 4 It" was "an out-of-place hip-hop track", while Jordan Miller of BreatheHeavy felt that the song was "vulnerable" and unfavorably predicted that it will "probably become a single" in the future. Daniel Bromfield of Pretty Much Amazing panned "Asking 4 It" but enjoyed Fetty Wap's contribution to the track; Bromfield thought "it's tragic how completely [Fetty Wap] upstages Stefani" and how Fetty Wap showed emotion during his verse while Stefani did not.

== Live performances ==
"Asking 4 It" was selected by Stefani for inclusion at her This Is What the Truth Feels Like Tour (2016). The song was included during Act 3 of the concert series, immediately following a performance of Talk Talk's "It's My Life". On the opening night of the tour on July 12 at the Xfinity Center in Mansfield, Massachusetts, the show was broadcast live through a feed generated by Live Nation Entertainment and Yahoo! Music. It was accompanied with "bumptious hip hop beats", alongside the singer wearing a green corset designed by The Blonds, in addition to Mariel Haenn and Rob Zangardi.

== Credits and personnel ==
Recording

- Recorded at Westlake Recording Studios, Los Angeles; and The Hide Out Studios, London

Management

- Songs of Break Out My Cocoon LLC (ASCAP) and Emi April Music Inc. (ASCAP)
- Songs of Warner-Tamerlane Publishing Corp. on behalf of itself and Justin's School For Girls (BMI) / Thanks For The Songs Richard (BMI)
- Fetty Wap appears courtesy of 300 Records

Personnel

- Gwen Stefani – lead vocals, songwriting
- Mike Anderson – recording, tracking
- Tim Blacksmith – additional production
- Danny D – additional production
- Mikkel Eriksen – songwriting
- Tor Hermansen – songwriting
- Willie Maxwell II – guest vocals, songwriting
- Julia Michaels – songwriting
- Stargate – production
- Mark "Spike" Stent – mixing
- Justin Tranter – songwriting
- Miles Walker – recording, tracking

Credits adapted from the liner notes of This Is What the Truth Feels Like
