= This Is What the Truth Feels Like Tour =

2016 concert tour by Gwen Stefani

- Tour by Gwen Stefani
- Promotional poster for the tour
- Associated album: This Is What the Truth Feels Like
- Start date: July 12, 2016
- End date: October 30, 2016
- Legs: 1
- No. of shows: 30 ($9.5M Box Office)

Gwen Stefani concert chronology
- MasterCard Priceless Surprises Presents Gwen Stefani (2015–16); This Is What the Truth Feels Like Tour (2016); Gwen Stefani – Just a Girl (2018–2021)

The This Is What the Truth Feels Like Tour was the third solo concert tour by American singer-songwriter Gwen Stefani, in support of her third solo studio album, This Is What the Truth Feels Like (2016). It began on July 12, 2016, in Mansfield, Massachusetts at the Xfinity Center and continued throughout North America before concluding on October 30, 2016, in Irvine, California at Irvine Meadows Amphitheatre, the venue's final show before closing permanently.

== Background ==
The tour was officially revealed in late April 2016 with twenty-seven dates in the US and Canada. Stefani toured together with Eve, with whom she had already collaborated on the singles "Let Me Blow Ya Mind" and "Rich Girl".

== Setlist ==
This setlist was obtained from the July 12, 2016, concert, held at the Xfinity Center in Mansfield, Massachusetts. It does not represent all concerts for the duration of the tour.

1. "Red Flag"
2. "Wind It Up"
3. "Baby Don't Lie"
4. "Obsessed"
5. "Where Would I Be?"
6. "Cool"
7. "Make Me Like You"
8. "Danger Zone"
9. "Misery"
10. "Luxurious"
11. "Harajuku Girls" / "Let Me Blow Ya Mind" (with Eve)
12. "Rich Girl" (with Eve)
13. "Hella Good"
14. "Rare"
15. "What You Waiting For?"
16. "It's My Life"
17. "Asking 4 It"
18. "Don't Speak"
19. "Naughty"
20. "Used to Love You"
21. "Hollaback Girl"

Encore

22. "Truth"
23. "Just a Girl"
24. "The Sweet Escape"
Notes
- Since the second show in Virginia Beach, Stefani performed a similar set to Mansfield opening show and added "Underneath It All", single by No Doubt from Rock Steady, with the song replacing "Danger Zone".
- Stefani performed "Send Me a Picture" in Toronto, Canada.
Special guests
- During the tour, each date was supported by London DJ & presenter Martin2Smoove; playing a selection music to entertain the fans.
- On July 16 & 17, August 2, 7, & 13, and October 15, Stefani was joined on stage by country singer Blake Shelton to perform their duet "Go Ahead and Break My Heart" from Shelton's 2016 album If I'm Honest.

== Tour dates ==
List of concerts, showing date, city, country, venue, opening act, tickets sold, number of available tickets and amount of gross revenue
Date	City	Country	Venue	Opening act	Attendance	Revenue
North America
July 12, 2016	Mansfield	United States	Xfinity Center	Eve	4,248 / 17,077 (25%)	$216,677
July 16, 2016	Virginia Beach	United States	Veterans United Home Loans Amphitheater	Eve	5,066 / 20,055 (25%)	$145,566
July 17, 2016	Bristow	United States	Jiffy Lube Live	Eve	5,669 / 22,623 (25%)	$216,022
July 19, 2016	Camden	United States	BB&T Pavilion	Eve	4,721 / 24,044 (20%)	$250,815
July 21, 2016	Wantagh	United States	Nikon at Jones Beach Theater	Eve	9,811 / 13,787 (71%)	$440,437
July 23, 2016	Charlotte	United States	PNC Music Pavilion	Eve	4,353 / 18,881 (23%)	$173,876
July 24, 2016	Raleigh	United States	Coastal Credit Union Music Park	Eve	3,673 / 19,945 (18%)	$119,573
July 26, 2016	Tampa	United States	MidFlorida Credit Union Amphitheatre	Eve	5,445 / 13,962 (39%)	$197,504
July 27, 2016	West Palm Beach	United States	Perfect Vodka Amphitheatre	Eve	6,886 / 19,184 (36%)	$293,131
July 29, 2016	Alpharetta	United States	Verizon Wireless Amphitheatre at Encore Park	Eve	6,826 / 12,500 (55%)	$255,311
July 31, 2016	Noblesville	United States	Klipsch Music Center	Eve	3,926 / 24,131 (16%)	$158,171
August 2, 2016	Clarkston	United States	DTE Energy Music Theatre	Eve	—N/a	—N/a
August 4, 2016	Toronto	Canada	Molson Canadian Amphitheatre	Eve	—N/a	—N/a
August 6, 2016	Tinley Park	United States	Hollywood Casino Amphitheatre	Eve	—N/a	—N/a
August 7, 2016	Saint Paul	United States	Xcel Energy Center	Eve	—N/a	—N/a
August 9, 2016	Cincinnati	United States	Riverbend Music Center	Eve	—N/a	—N/a
August 10, 2016	Maryland Heights	United States	Hollywood Casino Amphitheatre	Eve	—N/a	—N/a
August 12, 2016	Kansas City	United States	Sprint Center	Eve	—N/a	—N/a
August 13, 2016	Dallas	United States	Gexa Energy Pavilion	Eve	—N/a	—N/a
August 14, 2016	The Woodlands	United States	Cynthia Woods Mitchell Pavilion	Eve	7,530 / 16,340 (46%)	$392,067
August 16, 2016	Austin	United States	Austin360 Amphitheater	Eve	—N/a	—N/a
August 19, 2016	Las Vegas	United States	T-Mobile Arena	Eve	7,424 / 8,008 (93%)	$733,417
August 24, 2016	Seattle	United States	KeyArena	Eve	6,583 / 7,565 (87%)	$423,972
August 25, 2016	Vancouver	Canada	Rogers Arena	Eve	8,746 / 10,052 (87%)	$390,861
August 27, 2016	Fresno	United States	Save Mart Center	Eve	6,711 / 10,318 (65%)	$497,793
October 8, 2016	Mountain View	United States	Shoreline Amphitheatre	Eve	—N/a	—N/a
October 15, 2016	Inglewood	United States	The Forum	Eve	24,923 / 24,923 (100%)	$1,682,087
October 16, 2016	Inglewood	United States	The Forum	Eve	24,923 / 24,923 (100%)	$1,682,087
October 29, 2016	Irvine	United States	Irvine Meadows Amphitheatre	Young the Giant	—N/a	—N/a
October 30, 2016	Irvine	United States	Irvine Meadows Amphitheatre	Young the Giant	—N/a	—N/a
Total					122,541 / 283,395 (43%)	$6,587,280
