= This Is What the Truth Feels Like =

- Standard cover

Studio album by Gwen Stefani
- Released: March 18, 2016
- Recorded: 2015–2016
- Studios: Wolf Cousins, Stockholm (Note: Tracks 1, 4 and 5); Maratone, Stockholm; Interscope, Santa Monica, California; Ameraycan, North Hollywood, California (Note: Tracks 2, 3, 7 and 12); Echo, Los Angeles, California; Westlake, Los Angeles, California (Note: Tracks 6, 8, 10, 11 and 13–17); The Hide Out, London (Note: Track 9)
- Genre: Pop
- Length: 41:37
- Label: Interscope
- Producers: Mike Green; Greg Kurstin; Mattman & Robin; J.R. Rotem; Stargate

Gwen Stefani chronology
The Sweet Escape (2006)	This Is What the Truth Feels Like (2016)	You Make It Feel Like Christmas (2017)

Singles from This Is What the Truth Feels Like
- 1. "Used to Love You" Released: October 20, 2015; 2. "Make Me Like You" Released: February 12, 2016; 3. "Misery" Released: May 23, 2016

This Is What the Truth Feels Like is the third studio album by American singer Gwen Stefani. It was released on March 18, 2016, by Interscope Records. Initially, the album was scheduled to be released in December 2014 with Stefani working with a handful of high-profile producers, and Benny Blanco serving as executive producer. However, after the underperformance of her 2014 singles and the writer's block Stefani suffered, she did not feel comfortable curating an album and scrapped the whole record in favor of starting again. The album's release was scheduled after Stefani hinted at it on her Twitter account.

Inspired by both the end of her marriage and eventual newfound romance, Stefani returned to writing new songs. With the help of producers J.R. Rotem, Mattman & Robin, and Greg Kurstin, as well as songwriters Justin Tranter and Julia Michaels, Stefani wrote the album in a few months. Describing it as a breakup record, she created songs with a sarcastic and dark-humor vibe, in addition to ones that felt real, joyful, and happy. Musically, This Is What the Truth Feels Like is a pop record that is similar to the material on Stefani's previous studio albums. The record includes a guest appearance by rapper Fetty Wap.

The album received generally favorable reviews from critics, who praised its honest and vulnerable nature and considered it her most personal album. However, some thought the album was too calculated and did not capture the essence of a breakup album because it lacked a clear focus. Commercially, the album was moderately successful, becoming Stefani's first number one on the Billboard 200; in several other major music markets, it peaked within the top 40 on the charts. To further promote the album, Stefani embarked on her third concert tour, the This Is What the Truth Feels Like Tour with rapper Eve in North America and headlined the Irvine Meadows Amphitheatre Final Shows with opening act Young the Giant.

The album's official lead single, "Used to Love You", was released on October 20, 2015, to a positive response and had moderate success on the charts. Its second single, "Make Me Like You", was released on February 12, 2016, with a similar reception. The accompanying music video was the first to be created live on television, and was broadcast during a commercial break for the 2016 Grammy Awards. "Misery" was originally issued as a promotional single before being released as the album's third single on May 23, 2016.

== Background ==
After giving birth to her third son on February 28, 2014, Gwen Stefani made her first public appearance at the 2014 Coachella Valley Music and Arts Festival on April 12, 2014, performing "Hollaback Girl" at the request of her longtime collaborator and friend Pharrell Williams, who was one of the festival's headliners. After the performance, Williams hinted at a possible return for the singer. In September 2014, she revealed she was writing for two records: her third solo studio album and her band No Doubt's seventh studio album. She told MTV News: "At this point I'm thinking about both, I can do both. [...] And it's just an amazing time; so many opportunities. I'm going into the studio tonight with Pharrell [Williams], I'm going to be writing and also just seeing what comes along my way. I've been recording a few things." In the same month, Stefani's manager Irving Azoff confirmed she was finishing the record with Williams, as well as planning to perform its lead single live on The Voice. Interscope Records chairman John Janick also revealed that producer Benny Blanco would be the album's executive producer and that it was slated to be released sometime in December 2014.

On October 20, 2014, Stefani released "Baby Don't Lie", produced by Blanco and Ryan Tedder, as the album's tentative lead-single. The song met with a mixed response from critics and saw moderate success on the charts. Soon after it was announced that a new song titled "Spark the Fire" would be released; produced by Pharrell Williams, it was released on December 1, 2014. She revealed to Spin in December 2014 that she worked with Calvin Harris, Charli XCX, and Sia on the album, and her desire to work with Chris Martin and Diplo at some point in the future. Despite performing the Sia-penned track "Start a War" during a concert, and registering two Charli XCX tracks ("Hard 2 Love" and "Hell Yeah Baby") with the BMI, they were never released physically. In January 2015, the singer revealed she had decided to slow the album's recording process because she felt it was not complete. In May 2015, rapper LunchMoney Lewis told Ryan Seacrest he was working with Stefani on the record.

In August, Stefani filed for divorce from her husband Gavin Rossdale after almost thirteen years of marriage. In October, Stefani revealed to Entertainment Weekly that she scrapped the album and started again, since "[i]t didn't feel right. [...] I didn't feel fulfilled. That record with Benny was done that way because I had just given birth and had just started on The Voice and felt like I should do something in music, but what was I going to do? There wasn't enough time. So I tried to make a record where I was just kind of involved—which is how a lot of people do it, but it didn't work for me". She later told Zane Lowe that she had attempted to curate an entire album, but it did not feel right and she needed to write her own material. She also revealed that she felt inspired again and started writing a lot of songs in a rapid progression, revealing: "I think I have enough for probably two albums. [...] I have to write a few more songs, because I feel like, might as well keep going while it's there. [...] I got 20 songs. I have a whole record in eight weeks, but I want to keep writing." Stefani also revealed she had worked with musicians Justin Tranter, Julia Michaels, Greg Kurstin, in addition to production duo Mattman & Robin and the Stargate production team. The album was completed in January 2016. Stefani revealed in an interview with Ellen DeGeneres on February 25 that "'four of five' songs" were written in the previous month.

== Writing and inspiration ==
There's this crazy thing where I was given this gift – which I didn't know about until it happened – that I could write these songs. But I was always so not confident about it and worried about it, and like writer's block, and all these things, and I was like that, I was so blocked for so long [...] But now it's happening again, and it's like the most incredible thing ever. It's so incredible to be able to use my gift again.

— Stefani about being inspired again to write songs for the album.

Thematically, Stefani considered the album to be mainly "a breakup record", declaring: "I would consider it a breakup record. [...] It just makes me believe in God and my journey. My cross to bear was to go through these heartbreaks and write these songs and help people." The singer also told Ryan Seacrest that while writing the songs for the album during her personal struggles with the end of her marriage, she felt the process was therapeutic. She commented: "The record company was like, 'Listen, we really think your record is too personal and no one is going to relate to this record and maybe you should just put it out as an artistic body of work—don't even think about radio'." She described the sensation of hearing this was like being punched in the stomach.

According to Stefani, the various emotions she had experienced in the past year would be reflected on the album. The first songs written for the album had a sarcastic and humorous vibe, while she later described the other songs as having a "realness" to them. The first song written for the album was "You Don't Know Me", a personal song penned with Rick Nowels. According to the singer, the song was "the first opening of the channel" of her songwriting inspiration. In the early stages, she also wrote a song with Linda Perry called "Medicine Man" while flying to No Doubt's Jazz Festival show in New Orleans. Another song, "Red Flag", was the first song she wrote with J.R. Rotem, Justin Tranter and Julia Michaels. She described it as a "work of art" for "express[ing] so clearly what [she] was [going through] at the time". They also worked on other songs, such as "Naughty", "Misery", which she considered a "really happy song," and "Make Me Like You", produced by Mattman & Robin, which, having been surprised by the result, she called "so good"!

== Themes ==
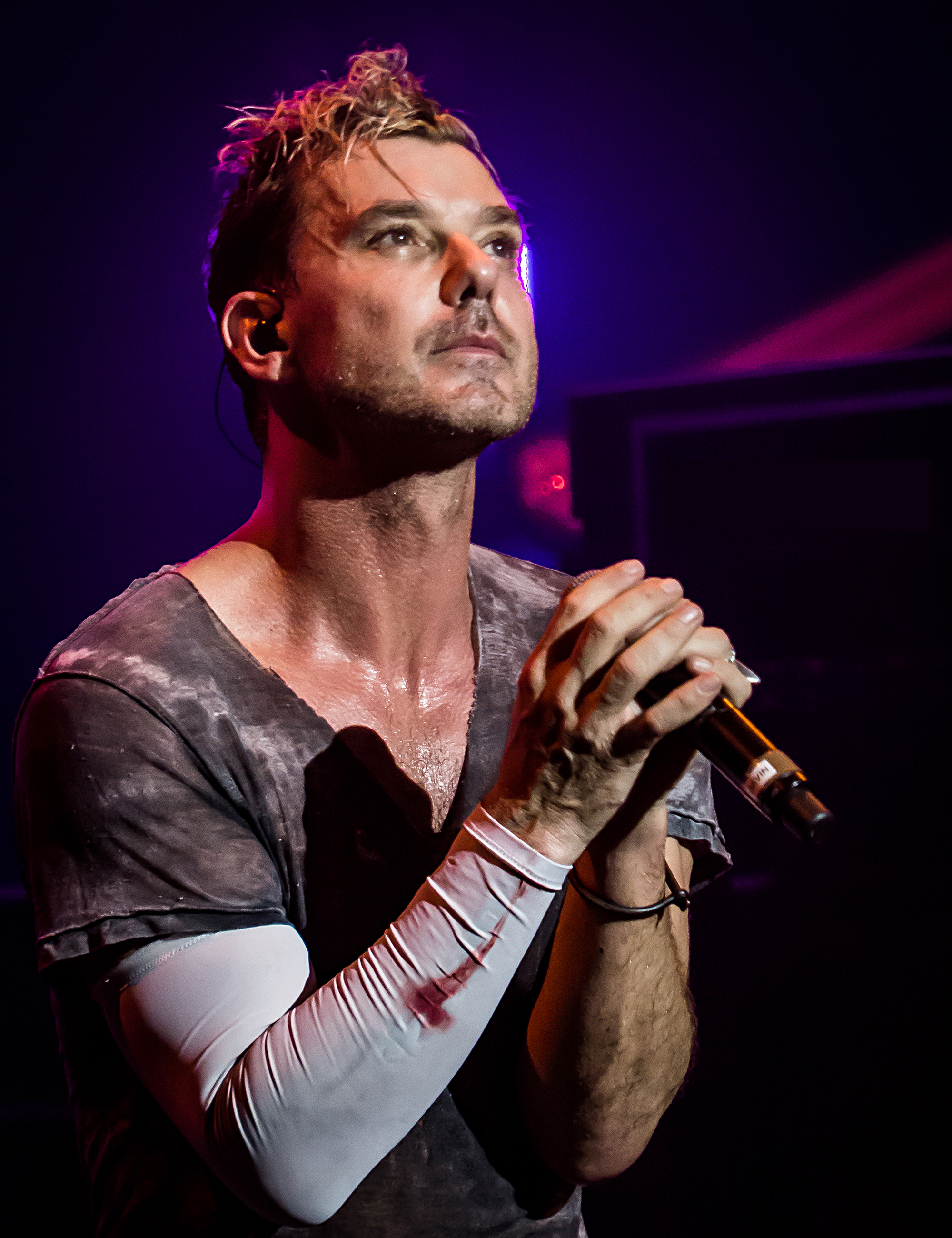
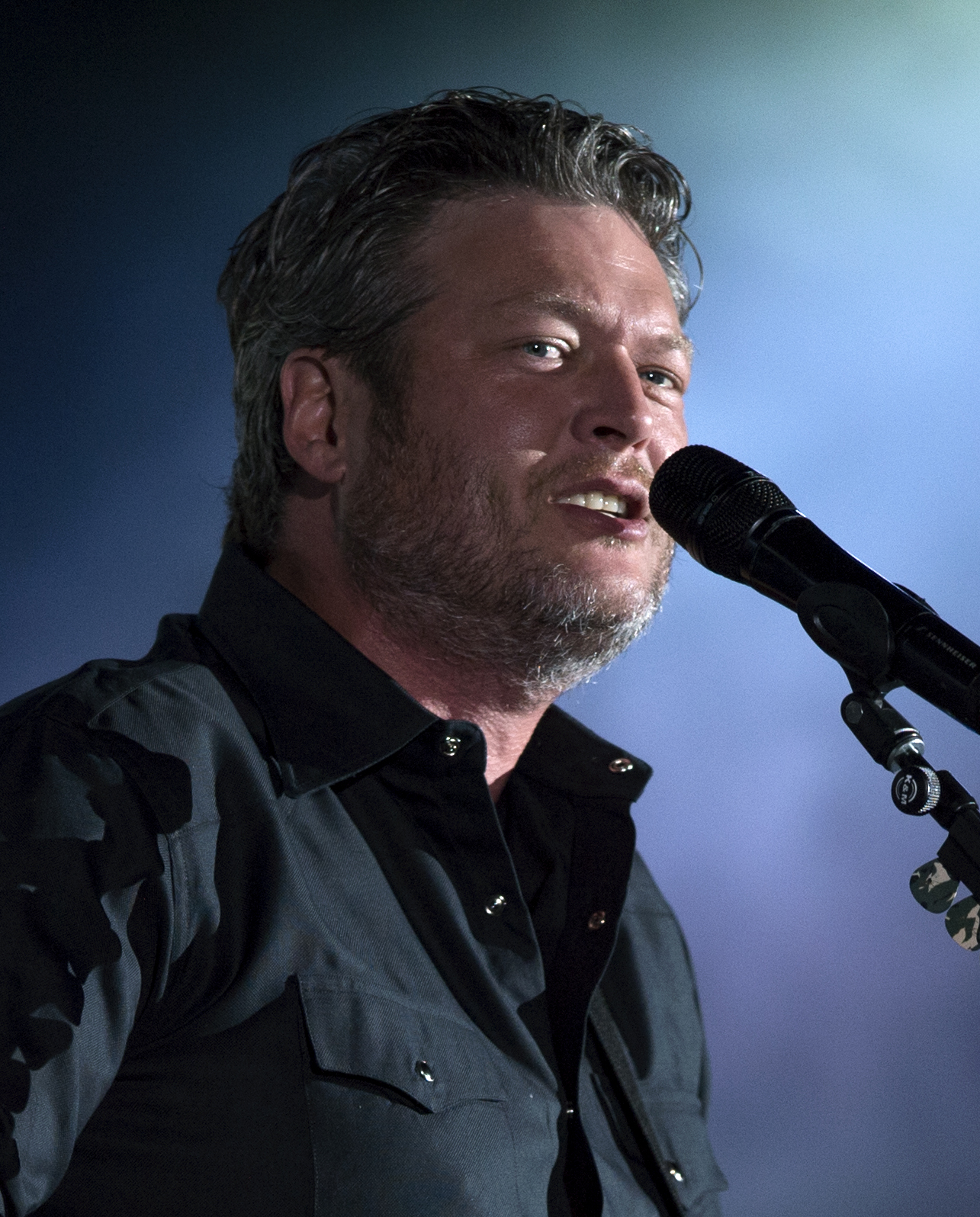
The album focuses on Stefani's divorce from Gavin Rossdale (left) and her subsequent relationship with Blake Shelton (right).

This Is What the Truth Feels Like focuses on several themes, including "moving on from a broken relationship" to "falling in love again". Her divorce from Gavin Rossdale served as the main source of inspiration for the former, while her subsequent romance with Blake Shelton served as an inspiration for the latter. The singer intended the album to show her desire for "forgiveness" instead of "revenge". Stefani's take on her "messy divorce" is evident in the single "Used to Love You", while tracks like "Send Me a Picture" and "Rare" find her embracing a new love. She kept the news of her divorce hidden from her writing and production teams during the recording sessions, however, Stefani "suspect[ed] her collaborators knew she was in crisis because of her lyrics". When asked in a GQ interview: "Did you think this project was going to be a heartbreak album? It seems like a falling-in-love album. Was that a surprise?" Stefani responded:

You are right. I did not think anything. I wasn't thinking. I was feeling and I was dying. And then I was just like, You can't go down like this! You have to turn this into music. You have to try, at least. I was so embarrassed by just everything. I just didn't want to be that person that just went down after all of that. A lot of the time in the sessions, they weren't letting me write. They were giving me tracks and doing it all. I was like, Why am I here? Then I got the perfect combination of people to really support me and make me feel confident. It was an amazing awakening. I walked into the session and I was like, You gotta know, I don't care about anything except the truth right here.

John Janick, the chairman and CEO of Interscope Geffen A&M Records, told Stefani that he was unsure of her songs "connect[ing] with people", encouraging her to create an "artistic record" and to skip radio altogether. Janick later changed his mind and got in touch with Stefani after listening to "Used to Love You". She called it "the most personal song" she had ever written and appreciated Janick's decision commenting: "That's never happened in my entire career." After writing "Truth", she was inspired to title the album with something similar. By the time several personal themed tracks were completed, Stefani began creating songs dealing with her newfound relationship with Shelton; "Make Me Like You" details "the early stage of their romance", while the title track suggests what the public might think of their romance, with lyrics such as: "They're all gonna say I'm rebounding, so rebound all over me".

This Is What the Truth Feels Like features a range of genres; including pop, reggae, disco and dancehall, R&B, hip hop and "punky" electro-pop music. Leah Greenblatt of Entertainment Weekly viewed it as "an album so directly torn from Stefani's recent, much-documented romantic upheavals that it could be called 'The Ballad of Blake and Gavin'". Stephen Thomas Erlewine of AllMusic added that: "Stefani spends roughly half of the record singing breezy songs of liberation." Sal Cinquemani of Slant Magazine commented: "While an artist converting personal tragedy into creative capital is hardly new, the nakedness with which Stefani assesses the ruins of her relationship is stark, especially compared to the self-proclaimed guilty pleasures of Love. Angel. Music. Baby. and The Sweet Escape." On writing about both relationships, Stefani claimed: "I don't have any secrets; I don't have anything to hide. I haven't done anything wrong. I'm happy to share my story. [This] is really the only record I've written that's mostly happy; all the others are about heartbreak. And there's some of that on here—it needed that, to make the rest feel as good as it feels."

== Music and lyrics ==
This Is What the Truth Feels Like begins with "Misery". An electropop song with "future-disco beats", the album's third single "captures the highs and lows of being gobsmacked in love". According to Nicki Gostin, writing for the New York Daily News, the song's lyrics are unclear and either detail Stefani's former relationship with Rossdale, or her current relationship with Shelton. The track makes several references to love and drugs through the use of hyperbole and cliches. "You're My Favorite" has "Super Mario 64 cave synths and [a] tinny, trap-adjacent percussion". The song was dubbed "the most 'Stefani-esque'" by Nicholaus James Jodlowski of Reporter magazine, while Jillian Mapes of Pitchfork found it comparable to Top 40 music. It was compared to her earlier songs, "Simple Kind of Life", "Underneath It All" and "Serious" by Theon Weber of Spin magazine. The third track, "Where Would I Be?", produced by Kurstin, is a reggae-flavored ska song. Its bridge has a "cheerleader taunt" and, according to Leonie Cooper of NME, it "sounds like she doesn't give a shit". Lyrically it mentions the possibilities of finding love, particularly in the line "Fill up my Solo Cup when I'm feeling so lonely." Weber found similarities between "Where Would I Be?" and Kurstin's earlier work with Lily Allen. The album's second single, "Make Me Like You", is a pop and disco song, written by Stefani, Tranter, Michaels, Mattias Larsson, and Robin Fredikkson. After the group completed the track, Stefani commented: "We were losing our minds." Its lyrics detail the "complicated feeling of falling hard when [one] least expect[s]", as well as reflecting Stefani's personal life.

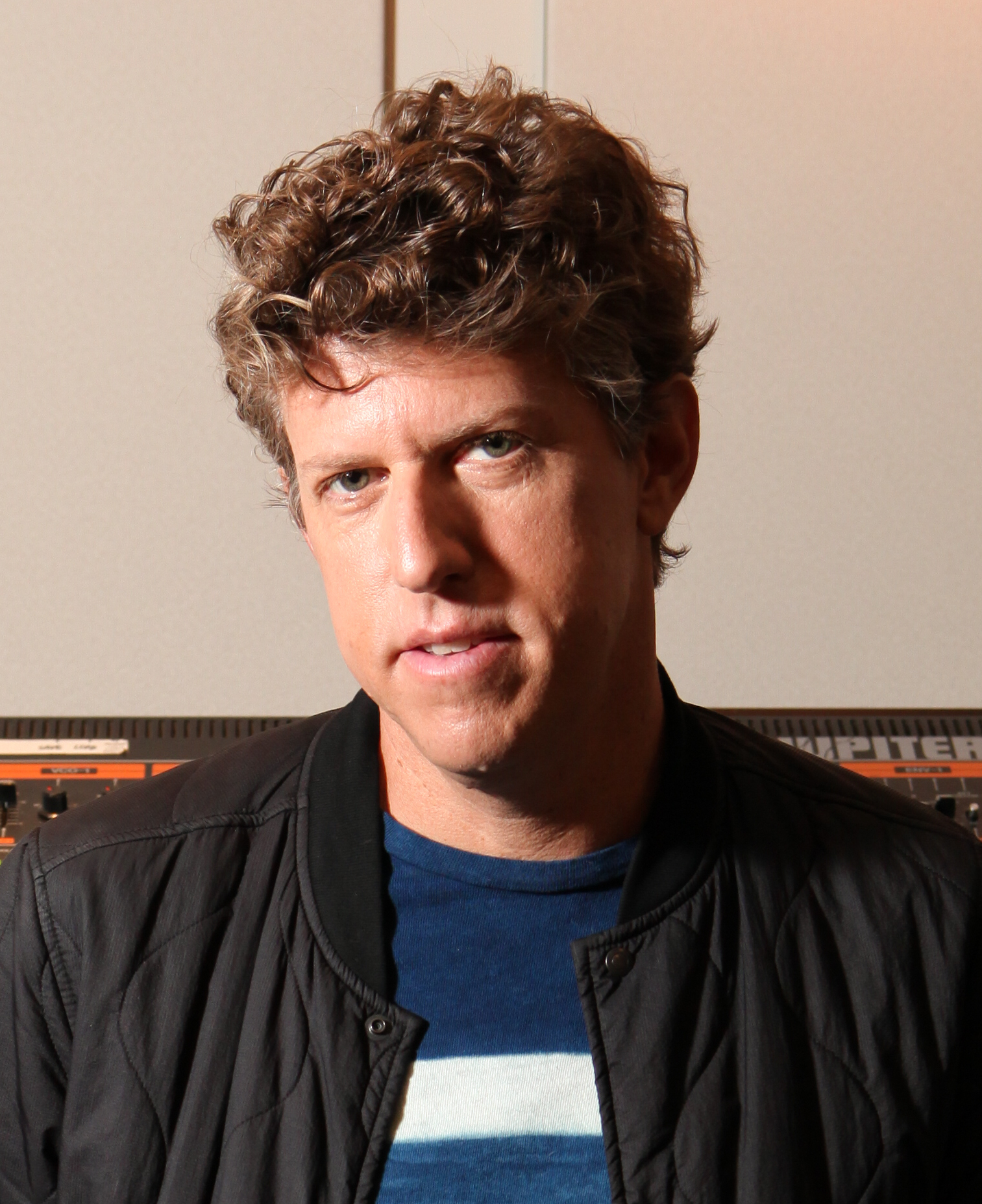
Greg Kurstin produced tracks "You're My Favorite", "Where Would I Be?", "Send Me a Picture" and "Rare".

"Truth", the album's title track, is an electropop composition with a guitar hook. According to Sarah Rodman of The Boston Globe, Shelton was the source of inspiration for the track, which reveals Stefani's "giddy new-crush enthusiasm". Both "Truth" and lead single "Used to Love You" are described as "truth-telling" songs by Kitty Empire of The Observer. With "Used to Love You", Stefani comes to terms with herself, dealing with the aftermath of her divorce, and realizing that her relationship with Rossdale is over. Produced by Rotem, the track is a "vulnerable" and "emotional" midtempo synth-pop ballad, designed to "showcase her passionate, conflicted vocals". In an interview with Today's Matt Lauer, Stefani confirmed that the track was inspired by the end of her marriage, and claimed that the song was only written a few weeks before its release. The seventh track, "Send Me a Picture", has dancehall elements, and was described as a sexting ode by several publications; furthermore, Mapes stated the song has a "Bieber-hits-the-islands vibe", while Annie Zaleski of The A.V. Club summarized its meaning as "captur[ing] the delicious anticipation of a crush potentially texting a snap". "Red Flag" begins with "an intro that sounds like a melting violin", followed by Stefani scorning her ex: "This is what happens when you don't listen to what your mother say." Amanda Dykan of AltWire found it reminiscent of 2000's "Ex-Girlfriend" and compared Stefani's rapping style to that of Lady Gaga's.

Track nine, "Asking 4 It", features rapper Fetty Wap. The composition consists of a "bopping, hip hop tinged beat flecked with dancey synths", while lyrically Stefani "asks a crush if they're sure about being with her". Stefani felt Fetty Wap had "a voice with so much character", so she told her team that she wanted to collaborate with him. Due to several scheduling conflicts with Fetty, the collaboration barely occurred, with Stefani calling it "a miracle" that it even happened. "Naughty"'s lyrics serve as a "kiss-off to a no-good guy who's been 'shady'". A "sly" and "bratty new wave" track, Stefani "chides someone for keeping secrets". In addition, the song has "piano swagger, Radiohead references, and a finger-wagging cheerleader chant". The next track, "Me Without You", finds Stefani "embrac[ing] a new life without a toxic partner" and "capturing the sense of relief and possibility" that follows a "painful breakup". Influenced by hip hop, it is primarily a ballad. The standard edition album closer, "Rare", is a folk song accompanied by an acoustic guitar and galloping beat. Several critics speculated that a particular lyric may have been aimed at Shelton's ex-wife, Miranda Lambert; an article from Fox News reported that "the lyrics appear to be a slam at Lambert for letting Shelton go", particularly: "You're rare / And only a stupid girl would let it go." Chuck Campbell of Go Knoxville compared Stefani's vocals in "Rare" to Ariana Grande's.

On the Target deluxe edition of This Is What the Truth Feels Like, "Rocket Ship" is the thirteenth track. It is a "chorus-less" song with a "solid hip hop arrangement" and a "melodic use of vocal samples". "Obsessed" contains "batty vocals" and the "hip hop style" that was displayed before on "Rocket Ship". The sixteenth track, "Splash", is the last song on the Target edition. The international edition of the album features bonus track "Loveable", while Japan-exclusive "War Paint" is a tribal song, with a critic from Est. '97 thinking of it as "an anti bully jam where confidence is key to protecting oneself".

== Release ==
During promotional interviews about "Used to Love You", Stefani confirmed the album was to be released in 2016. Since the release of "Baby Don't Lie" and "Spark the Fire", her then-untitled album was among many magazine's lists of The Most Anticipated Albums, for both 2015 and 2016. On February 9, 2016, she posted the album's track list through her Twitter account with the caption "This Is What the Truth Feels Like...", which was later confirmed as the album's title. A day later, the album's art cover was released, along with the titles of four bonus tracks exclusive to the Target edition. The release date was scheduled for March 18, 2016. The cover features a close-up shot of Stefani with "hand drawn hearts, tears and flowers", which according to Carolyn Menyes of Music Times, "giv[es] the record a sense of femininity and raw emotion". Using Stefani's official website, fans were able to create their own album cover with the same doodles on it by uploading a picture of their face to the site. Regarding the deluxe edition cover of the album, Christina Marfice from SheKnows Media speculated that it "includes a secret dis aimed at" her ex-husband; she stated: "And, in the corner, a ring drawn on her finger with a frowny face [is] connected to it by an arrow." However, the drawing was ultimately covered up by a sticker on this edition. Prior to the release of Shelton's tenth studio album, If I'm Honest (2016), several publications compared the cover to Stefani's, with Maeve McDermott of USA Today calling them "eerily similar".

== Promotion ==
=== Live performances ===
On October 17, 2015, Stefani performed "Used to Love You" at her first concert in over eight months at a MasterCard Priceless Surprises concert at New York's Hammerstein Ballroom. The singer wore a black turtle neck and striped skirt for the rendition; the performance was deemed "heart-wrenching", "powerful", and "emotional" by critics. Following the performance, it was announced that it would be released as the lead single from her upcoming album. She also sang the single at the 2015 American Music Awards accompanied by a group of backup dancers who dressed and acted like ninjas while on stage. Stefani also performed "Used to Love You" on The Ellen DeGeneres Show, The Voice, and immediately after midnight on Dick Clark's New Year's Rockin' Eve.

Stefani announced in February 2016 that "Make Me Like You" was the album's second single and that its music video would be filmed on live television, the first video produced this way, and aired during the Grammys. She partnered with Target for the event. It cost $12 million to produce, making it one of the most expensive music videos ever made. The performance went as planned, with a body double of Stefani taking a fake tumble towards the end of the video, leading several critics to believe Stefani herself messed up on live television. The following evening, Stefani appeared on Jimmy Kimmel Live! and confirmed that the tumble was planned. At another MasterCard concert in Tokyo on March 16, 2016, "Misery" was performed live for the first time. Her outfit consisted of "cropped red track pants and a red sequined cage top over a black bra" as the lyric video was displayed as the backdrop; the track was followed by "Make Me Like You".

Following the album's release, Stefani continued promoting This Is What the Truth Feels Like with several more television appearances. She performed "Misery" and "Make Me Like You" during a Saturday Night Live episode on April 2, 2016. She wore torn jeans and a high-waisted top, and was accompanied by several backup singers, including No Doubt touring members Gabrial McNair and Stephen Bradley. Two weeks later, she sang "Misery" on The Voice where it was announced as the album's third commercial single. On stage, Stefani and her backup dancers wore "colorful, tribal style ensembles" and performed using "a trippy, psychedelic lighting scheme". On July 1, 2016, it was revealed that the singer would be joining Today's "Summer Concert Series" on the fifteenth of the same month. For that show, she performed "Make Me Like You" and "Misery" from the parent album, in addition to earlier solo singles "The Sweet Escape" and "Hollaback Girl".

=== Singles ===
The album's lead single "Used to Love You" was released on October 20, 2015, three days after its live premiere. It was sent for radio airplay in the US on October 27. The song was critically acclaimed, with USA Today awarding it "Song of the Week" in late October, calling it the "spiritual sibling" of No Doubt's 1996 single "Don't Speak". An accompanying music video was released on the same day as the song. It consists in a single shot of Stefani in a white tank top, blue brassiere and gold necklace on a black background, emoting, and occasionally mouthing some of the song's words. The song performed moderately on the charts, peaking at number 52 on the Billboard Hot 100, and number 10 on the Adult Pop Songs, where it became Stefani's second highest entry on the chart. Elsewhere, it reached the lower regions of charts in Australia, Canada, and Scotland. Coinciding with her New Year's Eve performance, a MAIZE remix of the single was released on December 31. On March 11, 2016, "Used to Love You" was certified gold by the Recording Industry Association of America (RIAA), signifying sales of 500,000 copies.

"Make Me Like You" was released as the album's second single on February 12, 2016. It was first sent to mainstream radio in the United States on February 16, 2016, followed by an Italian radio release on March 25, 2016. Its music video was directed by Sophie Muller, and filmed on live television during the 2016 Grammy Awards, the first to be produced this way. Several easter eggs appear in the video, including references to her relationship with Shelton, in addition to cameos from her hairstylist, makeup artist, and various celebrities. The finished project was later posted on Vevo. The single was also moderately successful, peaking at number 54 on the Billboard Hot 100, and in the mid-regions of charts in Canada, France, and Japan. A remix EP featuring three different renditions of the track was made available on April 22, 2016, as a digital download. They were uploaded to Stefani's Vevo account the same day.

One week before the album's release, "Misery" was issued as a promotional single on March 11, 2016, followed by the release of a lyric video including hand-drawn lyrics and illustrations created by Stefani herself. The then-promo single charted in the lower regions of several countries. In Scotland it peaked at number 72, in Australia it peaked at number 74, and in the United States it peaked at number 11 on the Bubbling Under Hot 100 Singles extension chart. Stefani announced on Instagram that "Misery" would be the album's third single in April 2016. The song was sent to hot adult contemporary radio stations on May 23, 2016, and peaked at number 34 on the Adult Top 40 chart in the US, becoming her third consecutive entry from the parent album. As had been done with "Make Me Like You", a "Misery" three-track remix EP was released on June 24.

=== Tour ===
Stefani performing No Doubt's "Hella Good" during the This Is What the Truth Feels Like Tour.

To further promote the album, Stefani announced on April 18, 2016, that she would embark on her third solo concert tour, the This Is What the Truth Feels Like Tour, visiting 28 venues the United States and Canada, beginning July 12, 2016. American rapper Eve toured with the singer as a guest artist. The concert series ended on October 15–16, 2016, with a two-night performance at The Forum in Inglewood, California. The This Is What the Truth Feels Like Tour marked Stefani's first solo tour since The Sweet Escape Tour (2007) and first overall tour since the No Doubt 2009 Summer Tour. Through a partnership between Live Nation Entertainment and Yahoo! Music, a live feed was generated for the opening show at the Xfinity Center in Mansfield, Massachusetts. Several costume designers and stylists were commissioned for the tour's entirety, including The Blonds fashion house, and Mariel Haenn and Rob Zangardi. Corsets were a centerpiece of her wardrobe, with three originally designed pieces created for the singer. Her costumes generated positive reviews from critics, with Michelle Amabile Angermiller from Billboard nothing that her presence was "incredibly fun to watch".

In March 2016, the Los Angeles Times announced that the Irvine Meadows Amphitheatre would close in the fall, during its thirty-fifth year of seasonal performances. Prior to the news of the closure, City of Irvine officials discussed continuing the expansion of a local apartment development, which would be built atop the site. Representatives working with Stefani announced on September 9, 2016, that she would be the final act to perform in the theater in an event called Irvine Meadows Amphitheatre Final Shows, before deconstruction of the facilities began. She spoke of its closure: "I have so many memories at Irvine Meadows [...] It has been such an important part of my life both as an artist and as a fan and it will always hold a special place in my heart. I am humbled to perform there once again as it comes to a close." In an interview earlier in the week on a California radio show, she expressed her devastation at the closure. It was the venue for her first live performance with her band No Doubt opening for Ziggy Marley in 1990.

== Critical reception ==
Professional ratings
Aggregate scores
Source	Rating
Metacritic	62/100
Review scores
Source	Rating
AllMusic	3/5 stars
The A.V. Club	C+
Entertainment Weekly	A−
NME	3/5
The Observer	3/5 stars
Pitchfork	5.9/10
Rolling Stone	3/5 stars
Slant Magazine	3.5/5 stars
Spin	5/10
USA Today	2.5/4 stars

This Is What the Truth Feels Like received generally favorable reviews from contemporary music critics. At Metacritic, which assigns a normalized rating out of 100 to reviews from mainstream publications, the album received an average score of 62, based on 16 reviews. Leah Greenblatt of Entertainment Weekly stated that Stefani's material "feels truer—and sounds stronger—than it has in years". Mikael Wood of the Los Angeles Times was very positive in his review, highlighting that "[h]er singing—and, more important, what her singing is saying—is always front and center, which gives the music an intimate quality even at its most polished". Sarah Rodman of The Boston Globe called it "the best and most personal of her three solo releases". Sal Cinquemani of Slant Magazine discussed its urban-leaning beats, saying: "It's easy to chastise aging pop stars for chasing trends or trying to recapture past glories, but those efforts here are thrown into sharp relief by the maturity of the album's first half." Leoni Cooper of NME called it "an altogether glossier and more redemptive affair" than her first breakup record on her band's album Tragic Kingdom (1995). Kitty Empire of The Observer noted that the album gives emphasis on "bouncy, sonically unadventurous pop and fixated on Stefani's new relationship with Blake Shelton," but felt that: "A little more courage would not have gone amiss." Reviewing for The A.V. Club, Annie Zaleski observed that "Stefani never gets too juicy with the details, but her zings and observations are subtle enough to make these songs resonate deeply. [...] While the album has its flaws, it is undeniably compelling when its glimmers of vulnerability push to the forefront."

Rob Sheffield wrote for Rolling Stone that the album "has a rushed feel – a likable but low-personality version of her familiar bubble-pop solo mode". Stephen Thomas Erlewine of AllMusic found the album "a bit of mess" since "there's a lot of ground for her to cover". He also noted that, "By pursuing the twin inclinations to spill her heart while pushing musically forward, Stefani often mangles the mood." However, Erlewine noted that despite the "moments of emotional bloodletting or thirsty appeals to the top of the charts," the album "manages to be as fleet, giddy, and charming as Gwen Stefani ever is". Patrick Ryan of USA Today felt that "[d]espite the album title and Stefani's refreshingly candid press tour, it's sometimes hard to believe this is what her truth actually sounds like. But even if she's not being totally honest here, it's still more so than many of her pop peers." Jillian Mapes of Pitchfork criticized the songs she perceived were tailor-made for Top 40 radio, calling them "unremarkable" saying they "fail to match the unique specificity of her early solo hits". But she praised "the ones in which she is audibly upset—sometimes pissed off, sometimes sad, but best-case scenario, both. [...] [I]t's the fleeting moments like this—where she reminds us why we used to love her—that redeem 'This Is What the Truth Feels Like'." In a mixed review, Theon Weber of Spin commented, "[I]n creating a schism between her punkish pep and her new-wave nostalgia, it leaves the former stranded and the latter generic." Kate Hutchinson of The Guardian found the album to be "calculated" and a "little more than careerist chart fodder".

== Commercial performance ==
In the United States, the album debuted at number one on the Billboard 200 chart, selling 84,000 album-equivalent units. However, it also marked the lowest first week sales for one of her albums, with Love. Angel. Music. Baby. and The Sweet Escape selling 309,000 copies and 243,000 copies in their first weeks, respectively. With the release Stefani peaked at number four on the Billboard Artist 100 chart, up approximately 557% from her previous peak of 53, the chart's fourth-highest jump ever. The following week, Billboard reported that the album dropped 16 places on the Billboard 200, with sales decreasing 78% to 17,700 copies. For the next five weeks, the album continued to drop down the charts. In its seventh week, it jumped from number 82 to number 59. The record was on the chart for 13 weeks; its final position for the week ending August 6, 2016, was number 114.

On the Canadian Albums Chart compiled by Billboard, the record debuted at number three, becoming her third consecutive album to do so. The album sold 4,400 copies in its first week, and was held back from the top spot by compilation album La Voix IV, and Justin Bieber's Purpose. In the week ending April 16, 2016, the album dropped to number 18, before dropping off the charts altogether seven weeks later. In the United Kingdom, the album debuted at number 14, becoming the week's fifth highest debut. Stefani's two earlier albums coincidentally also made their first appearance on the UK chart at number 14. The following week, This Is What the Truth Feels Like dipped 54 positions, the week's largest drop. In Australia, the album debuted at number six, becoming her third consecutive top-ten solo album. This Is What the Truth Feels Like was the week's second highest debut, and was present for two weeks before departing the chart. On France's SNEP albums chart, it entered at number 44, becoming her lowest debut behind The Sweet Escape's peak at number 33.

The album fared moderately well on Switzerland's Hitparade, where it became her second highest performing album, peaking at number 10. Similarly in Spain, the album peaked at number 42, lasting a total of two weeks on the chart. Stefani's 2006 release, The Sweet Escape, did not chart. On Belgium's Ultratop Wallonia chart, it became her highest-peaking album, where it debuted at number 21 and charted for four consecutive weeks. On Belgium's Flanders chart, it peaked at number 32 and lasted six consecutive weeks. In Scotland and Ireland, the album debuted at numbers 13 and 17 respectively. Elsewhere, This Is What the Truth Feels Like peaked in the lower regions of the charts. In Italy, the album peaked at number 56. In Japan and South Korea, it peaked at numbers 74 and 75, respectively.

== Accolades ==
During a midyear report of albums released in 2016, Entertainment Weekly critics ranked This Is What the Truth Feels Like at number 11; a selected review by Greenblatt reads: "Loves lost and found provide the twin poles for Stefani's gorgeously honest chronicle of a very complicated year—and inspired some of her most purely satisfying pop songs in years." Newsday also ranked it in their midyear list at number 16. A Newsday critic called the album "a return to form", and compared it to her "fearless, boundary-pushing pop days of [...] Love. Angel. Music. Baby.".

This Is What the Truth Feels Like was also included on year-end lists compiled by several publications. Slant Magazine ranked the album at number 22 on their "25 Best Albums of 2016" list. Sam C. Mac from the magazine highlighted the album's assortment of "modern, commercially competitive and stylistically diverse pop" and compared Stefani's break from No Doubt to Annie Lennox's hiatus from the Eurythmics with the release of her 1992 solo album Diva. Glamour listed it at number 18 out of the year's 20 best and wrote, "Stefani has never sounded more vulnerable than she does on This Is What the Truth Feels Like, a vivid assortment of urgent, top 40 goods".

== Track listing ==
Standard edition
No.	Title	Writer(s)	Producer(s)	Length
1.	"Misery"	Gwen Stefani; Justin Tranter; Julia Michaels; Mattias Larsson; Robin Fredriksson	Mattman & Robin	3:26
2.	"You're My Favorite"	Stefani; Tranter; Michaels; Greg Kurstin	Kurstin	2:56
3.	"Where Would I Be?"	Stefani; Tranter; Michaels; Kurstin	Kurstin	3:18
4.	"Make Me Like You"	Stefani; Tranter; Michaels; Larsson; Fredriksson	Mattman & Robin	3:36
5.	"Truth"	Stefani; Tranter; Michaels; Larsson; Fredriksson	Mattman & Robin	3:34
6.	"Used to Love You"	Stefani; Tranter; Michaels; J.R. Rotem; Teal Douville	Rotem	3:47
7.	"Send Me a Picture"	Stefani; Tranter; Michaels; Kurstin	Kurstin	3:35
8.	"Red Flag"	Stefani; Tranter; Raja Kumari; Rotem	Rotem	3:20
9.	"Asking 4 It" (featuring Fetty Wap)	Stefani; Tranter; Michaels; Tor Hermansen; Mikkel Eriksen; Willie Maxwell II	Stargate; Tim Blacksmith^{[a]}; Danny D^{[a]}	3:30
10.	"Naughty"	Stefani; Tranter; Kumari; Rotem	Rotem	3:07
11.	"Me Without You"	Stefani; Tranter; Michaels; Rotem	Rotem	3:33
12.	"Rare"	Stefani; Tranter; Michaels; Kurstin	Kurstin	3:55
Total length:				41:37

International standard edition
No.	Title	Writer(s)	Producer(s)	Length
13.	"Loveable"	Stefani; Tranter; Kumari; Rotem	Rotem	3:18
Total length:				44:55

Target deluxe edition
No.	Title	Writer(s)	Producer(s)	Length
13.	"Rocket Ship"	Stefani; Tranter; Michaels; Rotem; Douville	Rotem; Douville^{[b]}	3:08
14.	"Getting Warmer"	Stefani; Tranter; Michaels; Rotem; Mike Green	Rotem; Green^{[b]}	3:24
15.	"Obsessed"	Stefani; Tranter; Kumari; Rotem	Rotem	3:36
16.	"Splash"	Stefani; Tranter; Kumari; Rotem	Rotem	3:50
Total length:				55:35

International deluxe edition
No.	Title	Writer(s)	Producer(s)	Length
17.	"Loveable"	Stefani; Tranter; Kumari; Rotem	Rotem	3:18
Total length:				58:53

Japanese edition
No.	Title	Writer(s)	Length
18.	"War Paint"	Stefani; Tranter; Kumari; Rotem; Lovy Longomba; Douville; Ivan Corraliza	3:49
Total length:			62:42

Notes

- ^{^a} signifies an executive producer
- ^{^b} signifies a co-producer

== Personnel ==
Credits adapted from the liner notes of the international deluxe edition of This Is What the Truth Feels Like.

=== Musicians ===
- Gwen Stefani – vocals
- Greg Kurstin – drums, keyboards (tracks 2, 3, 7, 12); bass, guitar (tracks 3, 12)
- Teal Douville – additional drum programming (track 6)
- Mikkel S. Eriksen – all instruments (track 9)
- Tor Hermansen – all instruments (track 9)
- Fetty Wap – vocals (track 9)

=== Technical ===
- Mattman & Robin – production, recording (tracks 1, 4, 5)
- Juan Carlos Torrado – recording assistance (tracks 1, 4, 5)
- Noah Passovoy – recording assistance (tracks 1, 4, 5)
- Serban Ghenea – mixing (tracks 1–7, 12)
- John Hanes – mixing engineering (tracks 1–7, 12)
- Phil Seaford – mixing engineering assistance (tracks 1–7, 12)
- Greg Kurstin – production, recording (tracks 2, 3, 7, 12)
- Alex Pasco – recording (tracks 2, 3, 7, 12)
- Julian Burg – recording (tracks 2, 3, 7, 12)
- Steven Felix – recording assistance (tracks 2, 3, 7, 12)
- Jonathan "J.R." Rotem – production (tracks 6, 8, 10, 11, 13–17)
- Samuel Kalandjian – engineering (tracks 6, 8, 10, 11, 13–17)
- Tony Maserati – mixing (tracks 8, 10, 11, 13)
- Tyler Scott – mixing assistance (tracks 8, 13)
- Stargate – production (track 9)
- Mikkel S. Eriksen – recording, tracking (track 9)
- Tim Blacksmith – executive production (track 9)
- Danny D – executive production (track 9)
- Mark "Spike" Stent – mixing (tracks 9, 14–17)
- Matty Green – mixing assistance (tracks 9, 14–17)
- Geoff Swan – mixing assistance (tracks 9, 14, 16, 17)
- Miles Comaskey – mixing assistance (tracks 10, 11)
- Teal Douville – co-production (track 13)
- Mike Green – co-production (track 14)
- Chris Gehringer – mastering at Sterling Sound, New York City
- Gwen Stefani – executive production

=== Artwork ===
- Gwen Stefani – creative direction, handwritten lyrics, drawings
- Jolie Clemens – art direction, layout
- Jamie Nelson – photography
- Emily Frye – layout

== Charts ==
=== Weekly charts ===
Weekly chart performance for This Is What the Truth Feels Like
Chart (2016)	Peak position
Australian Albums (ARIA)	6
Austrian Albums (Ö3 Austria)	38
Belgian Albums (Ultratop Flanders)	32
Belgian Albums (Ultratop Wallonia)	21
Canadian Albums (Billboard)	3
Czech Albums (ČNS IFPI)	28
Dutch Albums (Album Top 100)	49
French Albums (SNEP)	44
German Albums (Offizielle Top 100)	40
Greek Albums (IFPI)	36
Irish Albums (IRMA)	17
Italian Albums (FIMI)	56
Japanese Albums (Billboard)	85
Japanese Albums (Oricon)	74
New Zealand Albums (RMNZ)	15
Norwegian Albums (VG-lista)	40
Scottish Albums (Official Charts)	13
South Korean Albums (Gaon)	75
South Korean International Albums (Circle)	28
South Korean International Albums (Circle) Deluxe edition	15
Spanish Albums (Promusicae)	42
Swiss Albums (Schweizer Hitparade)	10
Swiss Albums (Media Control Romandy)	8
UK Albums (Official Charts)	14
US Billboard 200	1

=== Year-end charts ===
Year-end chart performance for This Is What the Truth Feels Like
Chart (2016)	Position
US Billboard 200	150

== Release history ==
Region	Date	Format	Edition	Label	Ref(s)
Canada	March 18, 2016	CD	Standard; deluxe	Universal	
Japan	March 18, 2016	CD	Deluxe	Universal	
United States	March 18, 2016	CD	Standard; deluxe	Interscope	
United States	May 27, 2016	LP	Standard	Interscope	
Canada	June 10, 2016	LP	Standard	Universal	

== See also ==
- List of Billboard 200 number-one albums of 2016
