= Used to Love You =

Single by Gwen Stefani

from the album This Is What the Truth Feels Like
- Released: October 20, 2015
- Recorded: 2015
- Studio: Westlake Studios (Los Angeles)
- Genre: Synth-pop
- Length: 3:47
- Label: Interscope
- Songwriters: Gwen Stefani; Justin Tranter; Julia Michaels; J.R. Rotem; Teal Douville
- Producer: J.R. Rotem

Gwen Stefani singles chronology
"Kings Never Die" (2015)	"Used to Love You" (2015)	"Make Me Like You" (2016)

Music video
- "Used to Love You" on YouTube

"Used to Love You" is a song recorded by American singer Gwen Stefani for her third studio album, This Is What the Truth Feels Like (2016). It was written by Stefani, Justin Tranter, Julia Michaels, J.R. Rotem and Teal Douville, and produced by Rotem. After scrapping the album and its two singles, "Baby Don't Lie", and "Spark the Fire", in favor to start over, Interscope Records released "Used to Love You" as the album's first official single on October 20, 2015. It was then serviced to mainstream radio on October 27, 2015.

"Used to Love You" is an emotional midtempo synthpop ballad, with its instrumentation consisting of a piano, restrained synths and drum taps. Lyrically, the song talks about a painful break-up, with the protagonist questioning why she fell in love. Stefani described the song as being inspired by the end of her 13-year marriage with Bush lead singer, Gavin Rossdale.

"Used to Love You" received widespread critical acclaim, with many critics praising its lyrical content and Stefani's emotional delivery. Others appreciated it for being a heartbreaking song. Critics viewed the single as an improvement over her 2014 releases, which Stefani herself later described as "rushed". Stefani first premiered the song during a concert on October 17, 2015, and its music video was released three days later. The music video is a single shot of Stefani on a black background, displaying her emotions, and occasionally mouthing some of the words of the song. The song received its first televised performance on The Ellen DeGeneres Show on October 26, 2015.

== Background and release ==
In October 2014, Stefani released her first solo single in six years, "Baby Don't Lie", and following its moderate impact and reception, a new single, "Spark the Fire", was released in December of the same year. However, both singles underperformed on the charts, prompting the album to be postponed for a 2015 release. After months with no updates on the album, Stefani revealed in an interview for Entertainment Weekly that she scrapped the entire album in favor of starting over, since she did not feel fulfilled and totally involved with the previous project. Stefani started writing new material in June 2015, and following her divorce from Gavin Rossdale a month later, she felt very inspired. In the same interview, Stefani claimed: "I needed to go through what I needed to go through to write the record that I needed to write. [...] These songs are really natural – they’re from not worrying about what happened or what’s going to happen but about living in the moment, from trying to be present and trying to feel."

A&R President Aaron Bay-Schuck at Interscope Records asked songwriters and producers J.R. Rotem, Justin Tranter and Julia Michaels to work with Stefani on the album. Stefani recalled saying the following to them during a recording session: "'Listen, I don’t care about anything. I don’t care about hits. I don’t care about anything except for coming in this room right now…all I want to do is just say the truth. I just want the truth to come out'." Michaels, revealed that "Gwen had written down of all of these things she was feeling at that moment. There was this one phrase that read, 'I don't know why I cry but I think it's because I remembered for the first time since I hated you that I used to love you.' I said, 'Whoa, what a crazy line that is.' She just goes, 'Cool, make it a melody. Let's go." The song was written after Stefani was told by her label that the album was too personal to release; she rebelled against their advice and continued writing personal songs. The next day she ended up writing what she thought was the least commercial song on the album, "Used to Love You", and they approved it.

On October 17, 2015, Stefani performed at a MasterCard Priceless Surprises concert at the Hammerstein Ballroom in New York City. Prior performing the show's encore, she wrote on her official Twitter account, "Ready for the encore? Hold tight—new single in 5–4–3–2–1!". Before performing "Used to Love You", she said, "I just want to share a song that I wrote recently. This song is really special." On October 19, 2015, Stefani revealed the single's cover art featuring a close-up picture of herself. A day later, October 20, 2015, the song was released to digital download on iTunes and other online platforms, while on October 27, 2015, Interscope Records serviced the song to mainstream radio as the official lead-single from the album.

== Composition ==
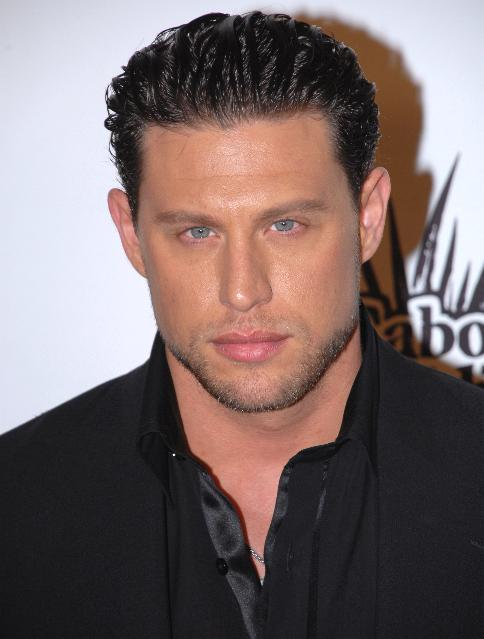
J.R. Rotem wrote and produced several songs with Stefani, including "Used to Love You".

"Used to Love You" was written by Stefani, Justin Tranter, Julia Michaels and J.R. Rotem; Rotem is also one of the song's producers. The song is a vulnerable and "emotional" midtempo synthpop ballad, having a "driving piano melody", with a length of three minutes and forty-seven seconds. Spin's James Grebey wrote that the song "largely showcases her passionate, conflicted vocals over restrained, electropop-leaning swells of emotional synths and drum taps." Lyrically, "Used to Love You" is a break-up anthem, where Stefani is questioning how she fell in love with her ex in the first place. The majority of music critics noted that the song is inspired by Stefani's divorce from Gavin Rossdale, after a 13-year marriage. In an interview for Today's Matt Lauer, Stefani confirmed that the track was inspired by the end of her marriage, claiming: "I’ve never put a record out where I’m actually going through things in real time. [But t]his is like, I wrote that song like a couple weeks ago." According to Daniel Kreps of Rolling Stone that could be seen in the lines of the chorus, "I don't know why I cry / But I think it's cause I remember for the first time / Since I hated you / That I used to love you." In other poignant lyrics, she sings, "I guess nobody taught you, nobody taught you how to love." Kreps further compared the lyrical content of "Used to Love You" to "Dreaming the Same Dream", a song from No Doubt's sixth album Push and Shove. Alex Kritselis of Bustle claimed that the song "recalls some of [her] best ballads, like 'Cool', 'Early Winter', and '4 in the Morning'."

== Critical reception ==
Since its release, "Used to Love You" has received critical acclaim from contemporary music critics. Madison Vain of Entertainment Weekly felt the song's "hyper-personal lyrics" were "immediate and affecting". Immediately following its release, Maeve McDermott from USA Today awarded the track "Song of the Week" in October, further adding that "[t]he song's spiritual sibling is another of Stefani's best works: 1996's No Doubt classic 'Don't Speak'," but noting that "this time around, coming from a more mature artist with fewer things to prove, the pain feels dizzyingly fresh." Bianca Gracie of Idolator praised the fact that the singer was "stepping away from the pumped-up vibes of previous tracks like 'Spark The Fire' & 'Baby Don’t Lie', also noting that "[h]eartache is immediately relatable (just ask Adele) and Gwen is often praised for her underrated slow songs [...], so it is refreshing to witness her jumpstart this current album era with a new vibe." Alex Kritselis of Bustle called it "a fantastic 'comeback single' – a tremendous improvement over 'Baby Don't Lie'," praising that "when she repeatedly sings, 'I don't know why I used to love you,' during the climax, you feel it." Music Times's Carolyn Menyes agreed, noting that "we haven't heard a breakup anthem from this girl since her Tragic Kingdom days. After a series of less-than-stellar singles, it's safe to say Stefani is back." In a later review of the parent album, Menyes stated she was "impressed with the vulnerability [...] displayed", comparing it to Stefani's previous singles "Cool" and "Ex-Girlfriend". Menyes concluded by saying the potential on This Is What the Truth Feels Like is evident on tracks like "Used to Love You".

Sean Fitz-Gerald of Vulture wrote that "the song veers toward Stefani's more mellifluous, sentimental fare," calling it a "heartrending track". Amanda Dykan of AltWire praised the track, stating: "[it] reaches through, wraps its acrylic-nailed fingers around your pulsating heart, rips it from your chest, throws it on the floor, and stomps all over it." Jillian Mapes of Pitchfork Media claimed that "Stefani – now 20 years wiser – flips it"; she continued with: "It’s a rare moment on the album where you can pick out Stefani from a sea of other pop singers." Mapes concluded by claiming that "Used to Love You" was her greatest song since "Don't Speak", comparing its effect to Madonna's 1989 single "Like a Prayer". Sean Fitz-Gerald of Vulture warned that when listening to this "heartending track" that "tissues are a must". Consequence of Sound critic Adam Kivel enjoyed the track, calling it a "recognizable moment in heartbreak delivered in a charming falsetto burble". Nate Jackson from OC Weekly appreciated the "somber[ness]" of the track, while Marcus Floyd from Renowned for Sound awarded it 4.5 out of 5 stars, claiming that "every lyric and every note are sung with heart and chorus just gets you". Michael Smith from the same website acknowledged "Used to Love You" as one of the strongest songs on This Is What the Truth Feels Like, calling it "unexpectedly heartfelt".

Spencer Kornhaber, writing for The Atlantic, called "Used to Love You" the "most heartbreaking" on the parent album, due to "its sentiment and execution". However, Kornhaber stated: "A raw observation and vocal squeak in the chorus might prompt tears like the ones in the accompanying video, but the rest of the song struggles." In a mixed review, Adam R. Holz of Plugged In (publication) found Stefani's "loiter[ing] precariously close to bitterness". However, Holz complimented the singer for "illsutrat[ing] the beautiful sanctity of matrimony [...] when its sacredness is violated". Mesfin Fekadu, a critic for The National, claimed the single "do[es]n't feel connected to Stefani – it's as if another pop star could sing the track and you wouldn't notice the difference".

== Chart performance ==
In the United States, "Used to Love You" debuted at number three on the Bubbling Under Hot 100 Singles chart, which serves as an extension to the Billboard Hot 100. It entered the Hot 100 at number 84 for the week ending November 14, 2015, in addition to debuting at number 40 on the Pop Songs component chart. Following a performance at the American Music Awards of 2015, "Used to Love You" re-entered the Hot 100 at number 77, its new peak. The performance helped sell an additional 29,000 digital copies, also prompting her to chart on the Artist 100 at number 82. The single lasted a total of nine weeks on the Hot 100, peaking at number 52 in December 2015, and departing its position of number 80 in January 2016. The week after Stefani performed "Used to Love You" on The Voice, the single peaked at number 14 on the Digital Songs component chart, given Stefani the highest increase for the week ending December 19, 2015. On October 27, 2015, it was released to contemporary hit radio in the United States. Its radio adds prompted the track to enter the Adult Top 40, where it peaked at number 10, spending a total of 15 weeks on the charts. It was Stefani's second highest peak on the chart, nearing 2005's "Cool" peak of number 4. For the week ending January 16, 2016, the song peaked at number 21 on the Adult Contemporary chart and Mainstream Top 40 charts, her highest entry ever for the former, and second lowest entry for the latter. On March 11, 2016, "Used to Love You" was certified gold by the Recording Industry Association of America, reporting sales of over 500,000 copies. This marked Stefani's first certification since her single "Hollaback Girl" in 2005.

Outside of the United States, "Used to Love You" was less successful, peaking in only four other countries. In Canada, the track peaked at number 57, becoming Stefani's lowest charting single; however, her follow-up single "Make Me Like You" would later becoming her lowest charting single, peaking at number 62 in February 2016. Additionally, the single spent several weeks on the Canadian radio charts, spending seven weeks on the Adult Contemporary chart, where it peaked at number 30. It spent eight weeks on the CHR/Top 40 chart, where it peaked at number 37, in addition to spending 12 weeks on the Hot AC list, where it charted at number 31. "Used to Love You" failed to enter the top 100 in the United Kingdom, instead peaking at number 157 on the UK Singles Chart on October 31, 2015. On the ARIA Charts in Australia, the single debuted and peaked at number 58, while in Scotland, it peaked at number 87 for the week of October 30 to November 5, 2015.

== Music video ==
On October 20, 2015, the same day of the song's release, Stefani premiered the music video, directed by Sophie Muller, on Facebook. The minimalistic one-shot video shows Stefani on the verge of tears while sitting in a dark space with a white tank top. Stefani noted that the video had been filmed inside of her dressing room for her New York performance, and was not intended to be released as the track's official music video. Carolyn Menyes of Music Times remarked that "though most of the video is spent near tears, Stefani sings key lyrics, just for an additional emotional trigger." McKenna Aiello of E! Online emphasized that "it's her ability to hold them back [tears] that really reveals Stefani's strong sense of self." Marc Inocencio, writing for Seacrest's website, noted that the video "is simple, yet, it’s enough to tell the story behind a recent heartbreak," calling it "really, really heartbreaking." Erin Strecker of Billboard echoed the same thought, while Joe Satran of The Huffington Post called it "spare, vulnerable and raw: the exact opposite of the exuberant, even maximalist videos we've come to expect from the No Doubt frontwoman." Bianca Gracie of Idolator described it as "poignant" and "raw".

== Live performances ==
On October 17, 2015, Stefani performed "Used to Love You" live during a concert for MasterCard users at the Hammerstein Ballroom in New York City. Stefani made the television debut of the song on The Ellen DeGeneres Show on October 26, 2015. In regards to Stefani's live performance, Joe Satran of The Huffington Post considered it "quite moving", while Caily Lindberg of Music Times called it "an emotional rendition". Robbie Daw wrote for Idolator that "[w]hile her black-clad band stood in the shadows quietly playing along and singing backup vocals, Gwen was front and center with her emotional breakup tune during her Ellen appearance, looking quite anguished but sounding on-point." On November 22, 2015, Stefani performed "Used to Love You" at the American Music Awards of 2015. Stefani performed the song live during various public appearances, including The Voice, The Tonight Show Starring Jimmy Fallon, and New Year's Eve with Carson Daly shortly after the countdown to the new year had ended.

== Track listing ==
Digital download
No.	Title	Length
1.	"Used to Love You"	3:47

Digital download (MAIZE Remix)
No.	Title	Length
1.	"Used to Love You (MAIZE Remix)"	3:32

== Credits and personnel ==
Recording

Recorded at Westlake Studios, Los Angeles, California

Personnel

- Gwen Stefani – vocals, songwriting
- Teal Douville – additional drum programming
- Chris Gehringer – mastering
- Serban Ghenea – mixing
- John Hanes – mixing engineering
- Samuel Kalandjian – engineering
- Julia Michaels – songwriting
- J.R. Rotem – production, songwriting
- Phil Seaford – mixing engineering assistance
- Justin Tranter – songwriting

Credits adapted from the liner notes of This Is What the Truth Feels Like.

== Charts ==
Chart performance for "Used to Love You"
Chart (2015–2016)	Peak position
Australia (ARIA)	58
Canada Hot 100 (Billboard)	57
Canada AC (Billboard)	30
Canada CHR/Top 40 (Billboard)	37
Canada Hot AC (Billboard)	31
Scottish Singles Sales (Official Charts)	87
UK Singles (Official Charts)	157
US Billboard Hot 100	52
US Adult Contemporary (Billboard)	21
US Adult Pop Airplay (Billboard)	10
US Pop Airplay (Billboard)	21

== Certifications ==
Certifications for "Used to Love You"
Region	Certification	Certified units/sales
United States (RIAA)	Gold	500,000^{‡}
^{‡} Sales+streaming figures based on certification alone.

== Release history ==
Region	Date	Format	Label
Various	October 20, 2015	Digital download	Interscope
United States	October 27, 2015	Mainstream radio	Interscope
United States	December 31, 2015	Digital download (Maize Remix)	Interscope
France	January 5, 2016	Digital download (Maize Remix)	Polydor
United Kingdom	January 5, 2016	Digital download (Maize Remix)	Polydor
Germany	January 5, 2016	Digital download (Maize Remix)	Universal
Italy	January 5, 2016	Digital download (Maize Remix)	Universal
Japan	January 5, 2016	Digital download (Maize Remix)	Universal
Spain	January 5, 2016	Digital download (Maize Remix)	Universal
