= Misery (Gwen Stefani song) =

Single by Gwen Stefani

from the album This Is What the Truth Feels Like
- Released: May 23, 2016
- Recorded: 2015–16
- Studio: Wolf Cousins Studios (Stockholm, Sweden); Maratone Studios (Stockholm, Sweden); Interscope Studios (Santa Monica, California)
- Genre: Electropop
- Length: 3:26
- Label: Interscope
- Songwriters: Gwen Stefani; Justin Tranter; Julia Michaels; Mattias Larsson; Robin Fredriksson
- Producer: Mattman & Robin

Gwen Stefani singles chronology
"Make Me Like You" (2016)	"Misery" (2016)	"You Make It Feel Like Christmas" (2017)

Music video
- "Misery" on YouTube

"Misery" is a song recorded by American singer Gwen Stefani for her third solo studio album, This Is What the Truth Feels Like (2016). Initially released as a promotional single, it became the record's third and final single on May 23, 2016, when it was sent to hot adult contemporary radio. Stefani co-wrote the song with Justin Tranter, Julia Michaels, Mattias Larsson, and Robin Frediksson, with the latter two serving as the producers. An electropop song, "Misery" uses digital hand clapping and an upbeat samba to produce a futuristic-sounding melody. The lyrics describe a lover who has recently started a relationship and is confused over what to think about it. Several critics drew comparisons between these lyrics to Stefani's personal and romantic life with her boyfriend, Blake Shelton.

"Misery" received a mixed response from contemporary music critics. Generally, some reviewers found the track to be a standout track among those on This Is What the Truth Feels Like for sounding "effortless", while others claimed that it was not on a par with Stefani's previously released material. In the United States, it missed entering the Billboard Hot 100, and instead debuted and peaked at number eleven on the Bubbling Under Hot 100 extension chart. Elsewhere, it peaked in the lower regions of charts in Australia, France, Scotland, and the United Kingdom. A remix EP featuring three different remixes of the song was made available as a digital download on June 24, 2016.

Two accompanying music videos were created for "Misery": The former featured hand drawn illustrations and was directed by Zack Sekuler, while the latter live-action version was directed by the singer's long-time collaborator Sophie Muller. It was filmed at the vacated Sears, Roebuck & Company Mail Order Building in Boyle Heights, Los Angeles, and features Stefani performing the song while she wears various outfits in the abandoned premises. The video was well-received, especially for Stefani's multiple costume changes. Makeup artist Gregory Arlt and hairstylist Danilo won the Best Hair & Make Up award at the 2016 Ibiza Music Video Awards for their contributions to the video. The singer performed "Misery" live on various occasions, including on television and during her This Is What the Truth Feels Like Tour in 2016.

== Concept and release ==
Immediately following the completion of "Make Me Like You", Stefani wrote "Misery" with Justin Tranter, Julia Michaels, Mattias Larsson, and Robin Frediksson; however, unlike the recording sessions for her previous albums, the songwriting process was significantly shorter, which she opined was because everything should be simple. "Misery" was recorded by Mattias Larsson and Robin Frediksson of Mattman & Robin at Wolf Cousins Studios and Maratone Studios in Stockholm, Sweden, and at Interscope Studios in Santa Monica, California. Additional recording was handled by Juan Carlos Torrado and Noah Passovoy, while Serban Ghenea mixed the audio at Mixstar Studios in Virginia Beach, Virginia.

In November 2015, Stefani reported "Misery" was the second single from her third studio album This Is What the Truth Feels Like (2016); however, "Make Me Like You" was released instead. The singer revealed via Twitter that it would actually be serviced as a "buzz" single, followed by her teasing a ten-second snippet of the finalized recording. Interscope Records released the song for digital consumption on March 11, 2016, before it was released to hot adult contemporary radio on May 23, 2016, as the album's third single. On April 22 of the same year, Interscope issued a digital EP and included three remixes of "Misery" created by disc jockeys Lincoln Jesser, Steven Redant, and Division 4 accompanied by Matt Consola.

== Composition and lyrics ==
"Misery" is an electropop song that lasts three minutes and twenty-six seconds. The upbeat composition is accompanied by a samba and heavy percussion, which was compared to the material on No Doubt's 2012 studio album, Push and Shove, by Sarah Grant from Rolling Stone. As described by Dee Lockett of Vulture, "Misery" contains: "some synths, a funky bassline, and well-placed hand claps to disguise the pain." Leoni Cooper of NME stated that "Misery" has "future-disco beats", and "captures the highs and lows of being "gobsmacked in love," using the metaphor that "a love is as irresistible as drugs." Nicki Gostin, writing for the New York Daily News, questioned the song's subject matter, stating "it's not clear who she's crooning about — ex Gavin Rossdale or new love Blake Shelton." Alexis Rhiannon of Bustle claimed that the song "give[s] an inside look to a painful past relationship."

Lyrically, "Misery" details the feelings one receives following a new relationship. Stefani sings: "Hurry up, come see me / Put me out of my misery", which shows the singer debating whether she wants to relive the pain or experience the pleasure. Elsewhere, she compares her boyfriend to medications: "You're like drugs to me / You're like drugs to me", and warns him that their newfound relationship is becoming a bit much: "You're in so much trouble / Yeah, you're in so much trouble". Additionally, she requests that the lover should come visit her: "You're at the door / I'm thinking things I never thought before / Like what your love would taste like / Give me more". Sal Cinquemani from Slant Magazine noted that Stefani's ex-husband Gavin Rossdale was not the track's subject, despite the misleading use of the word "Misery".

== Critical reception ==
Upon its release, "Misery" received a mixed to positive response from music critics. Thomas Hall of The Japan Times described "Misery" as "the type of anthem that could possibly provide Stefani with her comeback hit." Slant Magazine's Cinquemani called the track a "standout" on the parent album, and Mashable's Emily Blake agreed, challenging the listener to "try not to get hooked". Nicholaus James Jodlowski of Reporter magazine claimed: "[...] you're immediately drawn into Gwen's voice. You can hear classic Gwen but a new side of her as well." Similarly, Emilee Lindner of fuseTV complimented the singer for her "bouncy" vocals. Daniel Kreps of Rolling Stone applauded the song's lyrics for being "addictive" and "catchy". Regarding the same subject matter, Lucas Villa from AXS praised Stefani for: "continu[ing] her streak of solid pop tunes by turning her confessional lyrics into completely delectable hooks". He further stated that "if this is misery, sign us up for more of it please." However, Amanda Bell of MTV News was confused by the lyrical meaning, finding it to be less "straightforward" than the lyrics of her previous single "Make Me Like You".

Writing for Entertainment Weekly, Leah Greenblatt dubbed the single as a "come-on disguised as [a] caution". She also appreciated that it was ready to be played in clubs. A group of critics from PopMatters reviewed the recording in their "Singles Going Steady" column, with the site's consensus reading: "'Misery' isn't a total misfire, but it's formulaic diva-pop effervescence does little to convince you that music's mainstream was missing Stefani." Chris Conaton from the publication enjoyed the single and its "big ass chorus [with] a strong hook", but Chris Ingalls disliked that it was "not breaking any new ground". Ingalls, however, congratulated it for being a "well-produced pop/dance song". Adam Kivel of Consequence of Sound found the track to "lack an identifiable tone or feeling", but felt its overall sound was "effortless". At the end of the year, Entertainment Weekly placed "Misery" at number 36 on their 100 Best Songs of 2016 list.

== Chart performance ==
Issued as a promotional single seven days before the release of This Is What the Truth Feels Like, "Misery" entered the Bubbling Under Hot 100 Singles chart, which serves as an extension to the Billboard Hot 100, at number eleven. It entered the Digital Songs component chart as the forty-fifth most purchased download for the week ending April 2, 2016. Outside the United States, it peaked at lower positions on various charts. In Australia, the single debuted and peaked at number 74, becoming the third consecutive entry from the parent album. The track entered at number 177 on the UK Singles Chart, and at number 83 on the UK Download component chart. "Misery" did not peak on the Canadian Hot 100, but managed to take number 42 on the Canadian Digital Songs chart for the week ending April 2. It also appeared on the record charts in both France and Scotland, peaking at numbers 127 and 72, respectively. As of October 2016, "Misery" has sold 9,796 copies in France.

When announced as the album's third official single in April 2016, "Misery" was shopped to hot adult contemporary radio, starting on May 23 of the same year. The track debuted at number 38 on the Adult Top 40 for the week ending July 2, 2016, becoming her tenth entry as a solo artist on the chart. On July 30, the single reached a new peak at number 34, her second lowest entry on the chart, behind 2005's "Luxurious" with American rapper Slim Thug. It received 404 radio plays that week, reaching an audience of approximately 1.040 million in the United States. The following week of August 6, "Misery" lost 16 points total for overall radio adds, but increased its audience to 1.104 million; it lasted six weeks on the chart, departing in its final position at number 38.

== Music video ==
=== Background and development ===
Alongside the release of "Misery" as a promotional single, a lyric video featuring hand-drawn illustrations by Stefani was released on March 10, 2016. It displays handwritten lyrics by Stefani on graph paper, index cards, and post-it notes; it also features several photos of her during a photo shoot for This Is What the Truth Feels Like. That particular version of the video was directed by Zack Sekuler while production was handled by Jared Shelton. The music video for "Misery" was shot in spring 2016 in the neighborhood of Boyle Heights, Los Angeles, California. It was filmed at the Sears, Roebuck & Company Mail Order Building, which has been vacant since its closure in January 1992. Due to the large scale video project that was created for "Make Me Like You", the singer wanted to create a more traditional visual for "Misery", that shared the same artistic vision but was visually different. In an interview with Gary Graff of Music Connection, she spoke of the video's production:

With Misery we had the luxury of doing a two-day shoot, which is totally luxurious these days. And we got to do what we love the most, which is just fashion and making beautiful images, and not having any rules. It was very much on the fly. We went downtown to the abandoned Sears building; it’s all destroyed and creepy in there. We were there for two days and it was like an art project.

It was directed by Sophie Muller, who had previously directed various videos for Stefani, including those for "Don't Speak" (1996), "Cool" (2005), and "Spark the Fire" (2014), while the video's production was handled by Grant Jue of Wondros.

=== Synopsis ===
Stefani's "black bob wig" look was compared to her previous collaborations with the Harajuku Girls.

The video opens with Stefani standing behind a counter in an abandoned and faintly-lit warehouse. Her attire consists of a golden outfit and spiked crown, reminiscent of that of Lady Liberty. Various scenes of Stefani in a black wardrobe intertwine with other scenes in the video. The singer then wears a garden-inspired sheer dress and a "flower crown", as darkened shots of her face also are shown among a trio of background dancers. As the song's pre-chorus commences, Stefani is shown in a Gothic, black dress, sitting on a metallic silver couch, where she pretends to faint. For the remainder of the chorus, she wears a red, flowing dress and activates a smoke machine, which slowly starts to flow towards the singer.

The second verse shows her in the garden dress, as she continually rides an elevator through the warehouse; in a separate scene, the background dancers also ride the elevator. In front of a flower wallpaper, Stefani wears a fluffy, pink dress as she gracefully falls to floor. The next chorus shows Stefani in a black bob wig, "walk[ing] effortlessly down some stairs in patent leather, thigh-high stilettos." The song's bridge shows Stefani wearing a black and white leotard with thigh-high silver boots, sitting on a stool. A black horse appears alongside Stefani who is in a black and white-striped dress, before she slowly runs away from it. The song's final chorus has Stefani riding a bicycle through a brightly-lit parking garage, before she returns to the smoke machine and, once again, falls to the ground. As the song concludes, the screen fades to black.

=== Reception ===
The video for "Misery" premiered on Stefani's Vevo account on May 31, 2016. On the same night, it was distributed to iTunes as a paid download in the United States. Outside North America, the video was available for preorder in several countries starting May 11, but was not officially released until May 31, 2016. A majority of critics praised the video for creating glamorous and fashionable surroundings. Bustle's May Sofi ranked the nine outfits the singer wore during the video and listed her pink tulle frock at number one. The publication's consensus on their decision reads: "This adorable pink frock is not only super wearable, it's also pretty on-trend. The pale pink tulle gives off a ballerina-chic vibe, and we all know how popular that style has been as of late." The site listed the "floral co-ords" look in the bottom position, but still claimed that the outfit was "probably the most costume-like of [them] all." Seija Rankin of E! Online stated: "Contrary to the song's title, this tune and the corresponding video is not actually miserable at all; it's quite upbeat."

Madison Vain of Entertainment Weekly applauded the visual, calling it "gorgeous" and a "high-fashion affair", while Nate Scott from the USA Today praised the video and exclaimed: "Good lord, this video. Who is the art director? Come take my life over and make everything this beautiful." Entertainment Tonight's Antoinette Bueno praised Stefani for pulling off her fashion, despite the outfits being difficult to achieve successfully. The editors of Vogue, and columnist Patricia Garcia, were also appreciative of them. In her review, she called the outfits "eye-catching" and "quirky", in addition to the video as a whole which she felt was "stunning". Grant, writing for Rolling Stone, compared Stefani's portrayal in the video to that of Miss Havisham in Great Expectations, and commented positively that it fits Stefani's catalog well. At the 2016 Ibiza Music Video Festival held in the city of the same name, makeup artist Gregory Arlt and hairstylist Danilo won the award for Best Hair & Make Up.

== Live performances ==
Stefani performing "Misery" during the This Is What the Truth Feels Like Tour in 2016.

Stefani performed the track live during various public appearances. She performed it during her headlining tours, including the MasterCard Priceless Surprises Presents Tour (2015–16) and This Is What the Truth Feels Like Tour (2016). During the former promotional tour, "Misery" was only performed at the final show in Tokyo, Japan, before performances of "Cool" and "Make Me Like You". The choreography and costumes continued into these succeeding performances. During the rendition, Stefani wore "red track pants" and a "red sequined cage top" that revealed a black bra underneath. The promotional lyric video for "Misery" appeared as part of a backdrop for the performance, while an accompanying band provided live instrumentation. For the version on her This Is What the Truth Feels Like Tour, she wore a red corset designed by The Blonds, Mariel Haenn, and Rob Zangardi. The performance included the same visuals from her show in Tokyo, and contained similar choreography.

Outside her promotional concert tours, Stefani sang "Misery" on numerous television programs. Its first televised performance occurred on Saturday Night Live, where her No Doubt bandmates Stephen Bradley and Gabrial McNair accompanied her. Her attire consisted of torn jeans and a high-waisted top, which is comparable to her clothing on previous performances. On the April 19, 2016, episode of The Voice, the song was sung live by the singer, who created an Indian-inspired atmosphere. Backup singers and dancers, in addition to a "psychedelic lighting scheme", joined Stefani as she sang it in front a live audience. At the end of the performance, her boyfriend Shelton welcomed her with a standing ovation and continuous applause. The single's most recent performance occurred on July 15, 2016, during Today, where she also sang her singles "Make Me Like You", "Hollaback Girl", and "The Sweet Escape".

== Track listing ==
Digital download
No.	Title	Length
1.	"Misery"	3:26

Digital download - Misery (Remixed)
No.	Title	Length
1.	"Misery (Lincoln Jesser Remix)"	3:50
2.	"Misery (Division 4 & Matt Consola Extended Remix)"	6:24
3.	"Misery (Steven Redant Club Mix)"	4:23

== Credits and personnel ==
Credits adapted from the liner notes of This Is What the Truth Feels Like, Interscope Records.

Recording

- Recorded at Wolf Cousins Studios, Stockholm, Sweden; Maratone Studios, Stockholm, Sweden; and Interscope Studios, Santa Monica, California

Personnel

- Gwen Stefani – lead vocals, songwriting
- Robin Fredriksson – songwriting
- Serban Ghenea – mixing
- John Hanes – mixing engineer
- Mattias Larsson – songwriting
- Julia Michaels – songwriting
- Mattman & Robin – production
- Phil Seaford – assistant mixing engineer
- Justin Tranter – songwriting

== Charts ==
Chart performance for "Misery"
Chart (2016)	Peak position
Australia (ARIA)	74
Canada Digital Song Sales (Billboard)	42
France (SNEP)	127
Scottish Singles Sales (Official Charts)	72
UK Singles (Official Charts)	171
US Bubbling Under Hot 100 (Billboard)	11
US Adult Pop Airplay (Billboard)	34
US Digital Song Sales (Billboard)	45

== Release history ==
Country	Date	Format	Label	Notes
Worldwide	March 11, 2016	Digital download	Interscope	Promotional single
United States	May 23, 2016	Hot adult contemporary	Interscope	Official single
Worldwide	June 24, 2016	Digital download	Interscope	Misery (Remixed)
