= Make Me Like You =

Single by Gwen Stefani

from the album This Is What the Truth Feels Like
- Released: February 12, 2016
- Recorded: 2015–16
- Studio: Wolf Cousins Studios (Stockholm, Sweden); Maratone Studios (Stockholm); Interscope Studios (Santa Monica, California)
- Genre: Pop; disco
- Length: 3:36
- Label: Interscope
- Songwriters: Gwen Stefani; Justin Tranter; Julia Michaels; Mattias Larsson; Robin Fredriksson
- Producer: Mattman & Robin

Gwen Stefani singles chronology
"Used to Love You" (2015)	"Make Me Like You" (2016)	"Misery" (2016)

Live video
- "Make Me Like You" on YouTube

"Make Me Like You" is a song by American singer Gwen Stefani for her third solo studio album, This Is What the Truth Feels Like (2016). The record's second single, it was released digitally on February 12, 2016, and distributed to contemporary hit radio on February 16 in the United States by Interscope. Mattias Larsson and Robin Fredriksson produced the song, which was co-written by Stefani, Larsson, Frediksson, Justin Tranter, and Julia Michaels. A pop and disco recording, "Make Me Like You" incorporates light rock, with guitars and digital harps over an uptempo melody. The lyrics, which were inspired by Stefani's relationship with singer Blake Shelton, explore finding and renewing love after a fractured relationship.

"Make Me Like You" received positive reviews from music critics who praised its upbeat, radio-friendly vibe. In the United States, it debuted and peaked at number 54 on the Billboard Hot 100, where it remained for five non-consecutive weeks. The single peaked lower in the charts of Japan, Canada and France. An extended play with three remixes of the song was released for digital download on April 22.

An accompanying music video, directed by Stefani's long-time collaborator Sophie Muller, was the first video to be filmed and broadcast on live television. The event, sponsored by the Target Corporation, took place during a commercial break for the 58th Annual Grammy Awards and cost an estimated $12 million to produce, making it one of the most-expensive music videos ever made. The video, which received positive comments from reviewers, includes several costume changes and a scene that pokes fun at the media scrutiny of Stefani's personal life. Stefani performed "Make Me Like You" live on television, during her 2016 This Is What the Truth Feels Like Tour, and as part of her one-off MasterCard Priceless Surprises and Irvine Meadows Amphitheatre concerts.

== Production and release ==
In 2014, Stefani began working on two albums: a follow-up to The Sweet Escape, her second solo album, and a new album with her band, No Doubt. Two singles, "Baby Don't Lie", and "Spark the Fire", were released towards the end of the year. In August 2015, Stefani filed for divorce from her husband, Gavin Rossdale, after almost thirteen years of marriage, and two months later she revealed that she had scrapped the work she had done for the new album, and started over with fresh material. She began working with Justin Tranter, and Julia Michaels, and after writing several songs dealing with the breakup of her marriage, Stefani began to work on songs inspired by her new relationship with singer Blake Shelton, including "Make Me Like You". The song took shape quickly, in "like, 10, 15 minutes", according to Stefani. The songwriting credit lists Stefani, Tranter and Michaels, and also credits Mattias Larsson and Robin Frediksson, the producers.

The vocals were recorded at Wolf Cousins Studios and Maratone Studios, both in Stockholm, and Interscope Studios in Santa Monica, California. Additional recording was handled by Juan Carlos Torrado and Noah Passovoy, and Serban Ghenea mixed the audio at Mixstar Studios in Virginia Beach, Virginia. The single's artwork, photographed by Jamie Nelson, features Stefani with a Marilyn Monroe-influenced hairstyle.

Although the singer initially reported that "Misery" would be the album's second single, "Make Me Like You" was chosen instead. Interscope Records released the song for digital download on February 12, 2016, before distributing it to mainstream radio stations in the United States and Italy on February 16 and March 25, respectively. On April 22, Interscope released a digital EP with three remixes of "Make Me Like You" produced by RAC, Chris Cox and Sad Money.

== Critical reception ==
"Make Me Like You"
Stefani is heard with "digi-harps" and "feathery guitar riffs" in "Make Me Like You".

"Make Me Like You" was generally praised by music critics, with a Billboard staff member noting the song's "creamy, upbeat pop". Idolator's Robbie Daw praised Stefani for "str[iking] Spring Pop Anthem gold", which he called "the perfect example of the type of pop we've been barely-patiently waiting for Gwen to churn out". Bianca Gracie and Mike Wass of Idolator also liked the song, with Gracie calling its melody "wildly infectious" and praising its "pure, vibrant and cheeky pop". Wass called it a "breezy anthem" and "a worthy addition to Gwen's discography". Spencer Kornhaber of The Atlantic compared the song's production and Stefani's "signature pout" to Sheryl Crow (whom he preferred for standing out "strong[ly]"). Comparing "Make Me Like You" to the Cardigans' "Lovefool", Adam Kivel of Consequence of Sound found the song's similarity "as much compliment as it is complaint". The Los Angeles Times' Mikael Wood wrote that Stefani "summon[s] a bit of the appealing insolence" of her work as lead singer of No Doubt. Wood praised her decision to work with Mattman & Robin on the track, calling their collaboration "savvy". Spin critic Theon Weber agreed, comparing the track to Stefani's "synth-pop era" "Simple Kind of Life" (2000), "Underneath It All" (2002) and "Serious" (2004) (which shared a "spacious, twinkling liteness"). Sal Cinquemani of Slant Magazine wrote that the song was "reminiscent of 2006's 'The Sweet Escape'", and Kelly Lawler of USA Today called it "catchy" and "sweet pop candy". Gregory Robinson of Redbrick agreed, calling "Make Me Like You" "another delicious slice of pop perfection" and writing, "Stefani's new release is definitely 'pop ear candy'".

Several critics called it a highlight of This Is What the Truth Feels Like. According to Pitchfork's Jillian Mapes, "Make Me Like You" was the album's "only ... song that really works". Carolyn Menyes of Music Times said that of the two songs which "capture ... the earliest stage[s] of a relationship" (the other was "Send Me a Picture"), "Make Me Like You" was "more exciting". Ryan Middleton, also from Music Times, wrote that its "solid production" gave him a "temporary earworm". Exclaim!'s Gregory Adams praised Stefani's "signature pipes" in the chorus, and Amanda Dykan of AltWire wrote that the singer had never really been away. Although Adam R. Holz of Plugged In (publication) appreciated the song's "honest lyrics", Lindsay Zoladz of Vulture found them "irrepressibly" and "convincingly teenage". In The Michigan Daily, Christian Kennedy called them "catchy without leaning towards the tepidity of much of today's pop music" and they suited the song's "well-oiled production". Mesfin Fekadu, a critic for The National, wrote that the single "do[es]n't feel connected to Stefani – it's as if another pop star could sing the track and you wouldn't notice the difference"; Fekadu found the song "disappointing for a singer who is usually a standout on the pop music scene".

== Commercial performance ==
In the United States, "Make Me Like You" reached number 54 on the Billboard Hot 100 and was the week's highest new entry. It entered on the Digital Songs chart at number 12, with digital sales of over 56,000 in its first week. The following week, it dropped to number 68 on the Hot 100, leaving the chart the week after that. After the release of This Is What the Truth Feels Like, "Make Me Like You" re-entered the Hot 100 chart at number 97. It remained on the Hot 100 for five weeks, dropping off the chart from number 100 the week of April 16, 2016. The song was distributed to contemporary hit radio on February 16, four days after its digital release. Its addition to radio playlists boosted the track into the Adult Top 40, where it reached number 17 and spent 12 weeks on the chart. For the week ending May 7, "Make Me Like You" peaked at number 24 on the Adult Contemporary chart. It peaked at number 23 on the Mainstream Top 40, the lowest peak of Stefani's career. Following the premiere of the song's music video, it was streamed over 1.95 million times on Spotify As of March 10, 2016, "Make Me Like You" had sold 104,879 digital copies.

In Canada, the song peaked at number 62, Stefani's lowest-charting single after 2015's "Used to Love You". It peaked in May 2016 at number 27 on the Billboard Canada AC chart and spent 18 weeks there. The song spent nine weeks at number 40 on the CHR/Top 40 chart and 12 weeks on the Hot AC chart, where it peaked at number 23. It was number 27 on the download component of the Official Finnish Charts. The song peaked at number 47 on the Japan Hot 100, Stefani's first (and only) appearance on that chart. After three weeks, it dropped off after it peaked. According to the French National Syndicate of Phonographic Publishing, "Make Me Like You" debuted at number 143, peaked at number 81 three weeks later and sold 9,343 copies.

The single was less successful elsewhere. In Australia, it debuted at number 99 and peaked at number 97 the following week, becoming Stefani's least-successful release in that country. In the United Kingdom, it missed the top 100, debuting and peaking at number 140. Fueled by digital downloads, the song entered the UK Singles Downloads Chart at number 63 for the week of February 19, 2016.

== Music video ==
=== Background and development ===
The music video for "Make Me Like You" was shot on February 15, 2016, in Burbank, California. It was filmed at the Warner Bros. lot during the live broadcast of the 58th Annual Grammy Awards. The video was directed by Sophie Muller, who had previously directed videos for Stefani's "Don't Speak" (1996), "Cool" (2005) and "Spark the Fire" (2014), and was produced by Grant Jue of Wondros. It was Stefani's first collaboration with Target Corporation, which became exclusive distributor of the deluxe edition of This Is What the Truth Feels Like. In a rehearsal shortly before the live broadcast, Stefani stumbled and hit her head, and in the confusion her stunt double turned to face the camera. Stefani joked that the mistakes "knocked some sense" into her, and the actual video went off without a hitch. After it was over, Stefani released a statement through Target:

Wow! That was the fastest four minutes. It's so amazing how much goes into one take. I couldn't be more proud of our team, especially Sophie, the cast and the crew for their hard work over the past few weeks. This entire project with Target has been such an incredible experience, and I'm so thankful for the opportunity to collaborate with them.

In an interview with Jimmy Kimmel on his nightly talk show, Stefani said she could barely believe that the performance occurred. According to Los Angeles Times and Music Times reviews, "She had personally worked on it continuously for about six days", from "7 in the morning 'til 3 in the morning". On February 22, 2016, Billboard reported that the video cost an estimated $12 million, making it one of the most-expensive music videos ever made. About $8 million was used to buy airtime, with the remainder spent on production.

=== Synopsis ===
The video refers to Stefani's personal life with a tabloid-magazine headline, "Gwen Pregnant with Alien Baby!"

In the video, Stefani wakes up amid debris from a car crash in a black-and-white striped gown over a black turtleneck and black pants. She gets up, walks past a line of hanging clocks and is greeted by four women in bodysuits. One of them removes Stefani's gown, and another replaces it with a red kimono. She enters a pink hair salon, where Stefani's friend and hairstylist Danilo Dixon greets her and seats her in a rolling chair. Salon assistant Meg DeAngelis gives Stefani a tabloid magazine with the headline "Gwen Pregnant with Alien Baby!", a reference to real-life pregnancy rumors. In the second verse, the singer changes into a sequined blazer in a mirror room and enters a red tunnel behind two male breakdancers.

During the bridge, Stefani walks into a dark room with five female figures wearing masks of her face. After intentionally bumping into two of them, she puts on a multi-colored poncho and rides a motorcycle with other women. During the third chorus, she changes into a long, white skirt reminiscent of a wedding gown and enters Blake's, a piano lounge (another reference to Shelton). Stefani stands at the bar, where bartender Todrick Hall pretends to mix drinks and wipe the counter. A background dancer picks her up and swings her in a circle, while others also dance. Stefani walks over to a piano and lip-syncs the song's bridge, while members of the production crew replace her high heels with roller skates. Entering a bullseye-shaped room, she skates through the chorus; her stunt double "falls", which surprises the other skaters. The video ends with Stefani, on a platform, lip-syncing the final words of the song; the camera pulls out, displaying the Target logo and red confetti falling from the studio ceiling.

=== Release and reception ===
The video for "Make Me Like You" premiered on Stefani's Vevo account the morning after its live broadcast on February 16, 2016. It was not available as a paid download in the United States until February 29. Outside North America, the video was released on June 7. Facebook Live promoted the video after its release; according to Target chief marketing officer Jeff Jones, "more than 3 billion media impressions ... for the campaign" were generated and the video had nearly two million YouTube views. Natalie Finn of E! Online called it "spot-on as always", and enjoyed the costume changes, roller-skating and "Gwen-look-alike dancers". Nolan Feeney wrote for Time, "Gwen Stefani wasn’t scheduled to perform during the 2016 Grammys, but she may have just delivered one of the evening’s most colorful performances anyway". Spin writer Brennan Carley gave the video a positive review, calling it "the definition of quintessential Stefani – bold, colorful, peppy, and utterly timeless". Cole Delbyck wrote for the Huffington Post, "Stefani turned a routine commercial break into a revolving, retro roller-skating bonanza, executing enough costume changes, choreography and visual stunts to make Grease: Live look like an embarrassing middle school musical".

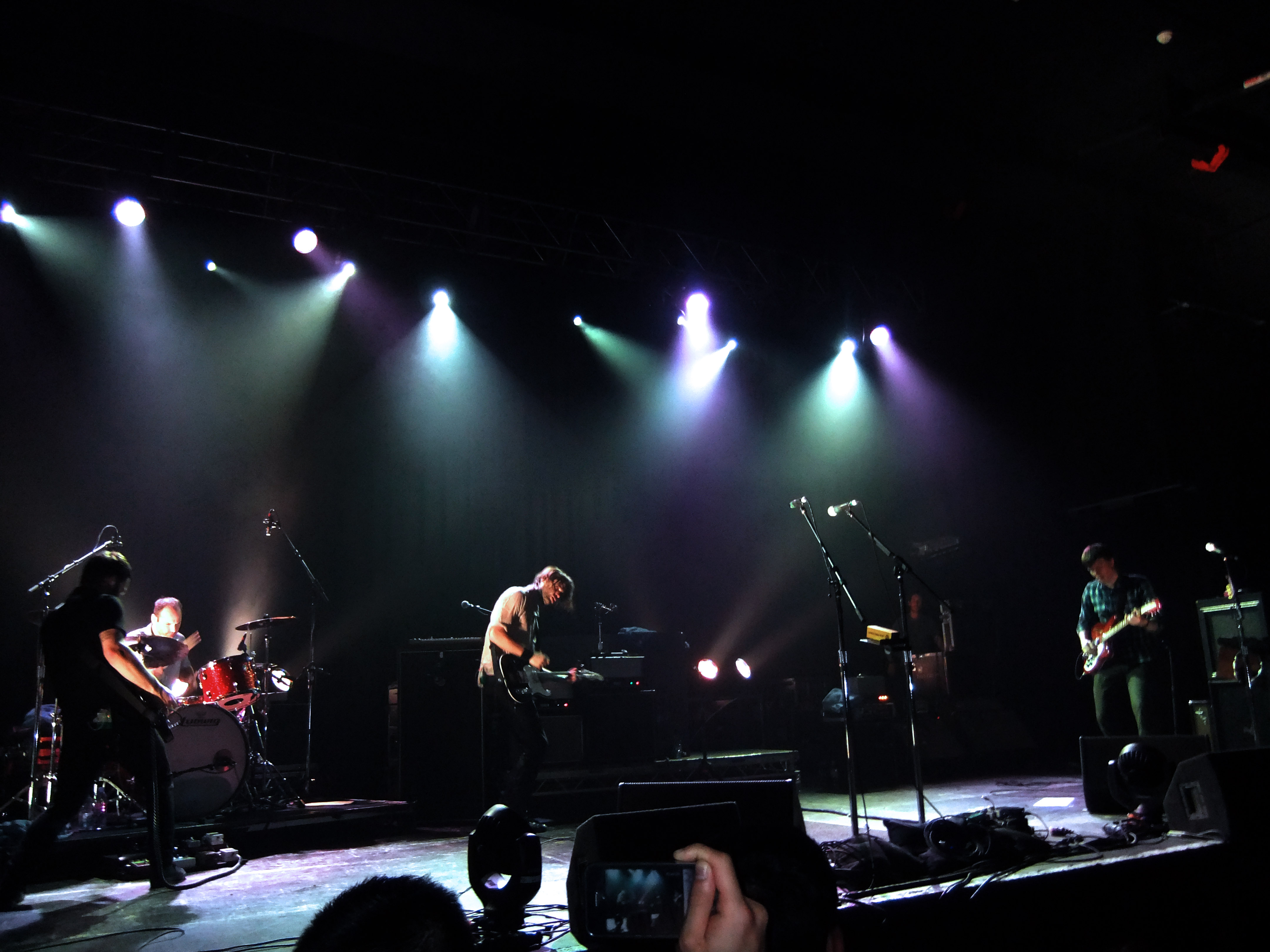
The video's inspiration was compared to Death Cab for Cutie's "You Are a Tourist" video.

The scene where Stefani's stunt double falls surprised critics at first, with many thinking that the fall was real. Delbyck called the stunt "confusing", but "if you look closely right before the fall, however, Stefani leaves the screen for a couple of seconds" (allowing her to change before the final scene). Calling the video "colorful", Justin Harp of Digital Spy enjoyed the stunt-double "trickery". The Michigan Daily's Kennedy described the video as "a brightly colored beacon of hope for continued experimentation in popular music". According to Erin Jensen of USA Today, it was a response to Stefani's "comment that her life 'blew up' with the demise of her marriage".

At the June 2016 Cannes Lions International Festival of Creativity, the video received a Bronze Lion in the Artist Associated Stunt or Activation in Partnership With a Brand category, the singer's first Cannes Lion. According to the festival, the award recognizes a "collaboration between a brand and a music artist to co-create publicity stunts or brand activations to increase a brand's reach and awareness and drive business". Unlike the Cannes Film Festival, the Cannes Lions festival recognizes advertising and the video was a cross-promotion by the singer and Target Corporation. At the Make-Up Artists and Hair Stylists Guild awards in 2017, makeup artists Mira Cho, Marisa Ramirez, and Gregory Arlt were nominated for their work in the video.

Although she was the first artist to broadcast a live music video on television, R&B musician Erykah Badu produced a live music video on Periscope for her "Phone Down" in November 2015. Indie rock band Death Cab for Cutie livestreamed a video for their single, "You Are a Tourist", on April 5, 2011. The unedited video was filmed in one take, with multiple cameras. At the 57th Annual Grammy Awards in 2015, Imagine Dragons used a similar concept. The band appeared in a "pirate-themed" advertisement (also sponsored by Target Corporation) in which they performed their single, "Shots", for the first time.

== Live performances ==
Stefani performing "Make Me Like You" during the 2016 This Is What the Truth Feels Like Tour.

Stefani performed the song live during a number of public appearances, including her headlining MasterCard Priceless Surprises Presents (2015–16) and This Is What the Truth Feels Like Tours (2016). During the MasterCard tour, "Make Me Like You" was performed at the final show in Tokyo before "Danger Zone" and "What You Waiting For?". Multi-colored tunnels appeared on video screens behind Stefani with, near the end of the song, images of the singer. On the This Is What the Truth Feels Like Tour, her performance included the Tokyo visuals and similar choreography.

Stefani sang "Make Me Like You" live on several television programs, introducing the song on Jimmy Kimmel Live! on February 17, 2016. Her performance was accompanied by an interview in which she explained the song's meaning. Stefani sang the track as a musical guest on The Ellen DeGeneres Show, Good Morning America and at the 2016 Radio Disney Music Awards. On April 2, 2016, she performed the song on Saturday Night Live with No Doubt bandmates Stephen Bradley and Gabrial McNair; she wore a "lacy, babydoll dress". Stefani also performed it on Today along with "Misery", "Hollaback Girl", and "The Sweet Escape" on July 15, 2016.

== Track listings ==
Digital download
No.	Title	Length
1.	"Make Me Like You"	3:36

Digital download (The Remixes)
No.	Title	Length
1.	"Make Me Like You (RAC Mix)"	3:29
2.	"Make Me Like You (Sad Money Remix)"	2:58
3.	"Make Me Like You (Chris Cox DMS Remix)"	4:49

== Credits and personnel ==
Credits adapted from the liner notes of This Is What the Truth Feels Like, Interscope Records.

Recording

- Recorded at Wolf Cousins Studios, Stockholm, Sweden; Maratone Studios, Stockholm, Sweden; and Interscope Studios, Santa Monica, California

Personnel

- Gwen Stefani – lead vocals, songwriting
- Robin Fredriksson – songwriting
- Serban Ghenea – mixing
- John Hanes – mixing engineer
- Mattias Larsson – songwriting
- Julia Michaels – songwriting
- Mattman & Robin – production
- Phil Seaford – assistant mixing engineer
- Justin Tranter – songwriting

== Charts ==
Chart performance for "Make Me Like You"
Chart (2016)	Peak position
Australia (ARIA)	97
Belgium (Ultratip Bubbling Under Flanders)	31
Canada Hot 100 (Billboard)	62
Canada AC (Billboard)	27
Canada CHR/Top 40 (Billboard)	40
Canada Hot AC (Billboard)	23
CIS Airplay (TopHit)	168
Croatia (HRT)	6
Finland Download (Latauslista)	27
France (SNEP)	81
Japan Hot 100 (Billboard)	47
Lebanon (The Official Lebanese Top 20)	19
Poland Airplay (ZPAV)	33
Slovakia Airplay (ČNS IFPI)	73
Slovenia (SloTop50)	47
Scottish Singles Sales (Official Charts)	61
UK Singles (Official Charts)	140
US Billboard Hot 100	54
US Adult Contemporary (Billboard)	24
US Adult Pop Airplay (Billboard)	17
US Pop Airplay (Billboard)	23

== Certifications ==
Region	Certification	Certified units/sales
United States (RIAA)	Gold	500,000^{‡}
^{‡} Sales+streaming figures based on certification alone.

== Release history ==
Country	Date	Format	Label
United States	February 12, 2016	Digital download	Interscope
United States	February 16, 2016	Mainstream radio	Interscope
Italy	March 25, 2016	Mainstream radio	Universal
United States	April 22, 2016	Digital remixes EP	Interscope
