= Spark the Fire =

Single by Gwen Stefani
- Released: December 1, 2014
- Genre: Dance-pop; hip hop; funk
- Length: 3:22
- Label: Mad Love; Interscope
- Songwriters: Gwen Stefani; Pharrell Williams
- Producer: Pharrell Williams

Gwen Stefani singles chronology
"Baby Don't Lie" (2014)	"Spark the Fire" (2014)	"Kings Never Die" (2015)

Music video
- "Spark the Fire" on YouTube

"Spark the Fire" is a song recorded by American singer and songwriter Gwen Stefani. The song was released on December 1, 2014. It was originally intended to be featured on Stefani's third studio album This Is What the Truth Feels Like, but it was scrapped in favor of new material. Stefani wrote "Spark the Fire" in collaboration with the song's producer Pharrell Williams. It is a dance-pop and hip hop track that incorporates funk. Along with the previous single, "Baby Don't Lie", the track was marketed as Stefani's musical comeback as a solo artist.

Critical responses to "Spark the Fire" were mixed with critics negatively comparing it to Stefani and Williams' previous collaboration "Hollaback Girl", while others favored it compared to "Baby Don't Lie". Lyrically, the song serves as a "comeback", discussing topics such as partying, having a good time, and feminism. "Spark the Fire" charted on Russia's music chart at number 326, failing to impact any other country's main chart, managing only to peak on the lower ends of the US Dance Club and Pop Digital Songs charts. Stefani performed the song live during various public appearances, including The Tonight Show Starring Jimmy Fallon where she performed it alongside a medley mix of her previous singles.

== Background ==
After releasing two solo albums, Love. Angel. Music. Baby (2004) and The Sweet Escape (2006), Stefani returned to work with her band No Doubt, and in 2012 they released their sixth studio album, Push and Shove. During that time, she claimed, "I never need to do that or want to do it again. I'm happy being in No Doubt." However, after an appearance during Pharrell Williams' performance at the 2014 Coachella Valley Music and Arts Festival, Pharrell teased that the rare live appearance from Stefani was the start of a comeback effort for the singer. Shortly after her Coachella performance, Stefani performed "Hollaback Girl" live on The Voice to further promote her upcoming role on the show.

During an interview for MTV News during New York Fashion Week, Stefani confirmed that she was working on new material for a solo album and a No Doubt album; she also stated, "I'm going into the studio tonight with Pharrell [Williams], I'm going to be writing and also just seeing what comes along my way. I've been recording a few things." Williams completed, "When I tell you she's killing it, it's another level." In an interview with the Windy City Media Group, Stefani said "[the song] was so perfect for my story-for what I was feeling in my own personal life-that I didn't even get it as a feminist anthem. I thought it was just about me! I was just feeling me." After the release of "Baby Don't Lie" a month prior, "Spark the Fire" was released on December 1, 2014.

== Composition and lyrics ==
"Spark the Fire" was written by Stefani and Pharrell Williams; Williams serves as the track's sole producer. The song is a dance-pop and hip hop track, with inclusions of funk music and heavy percussion. August Brown of the Los Angeles Times described the song as "full of vintage Pharrell moves: pep-band drum lines, percussive blips and a lot of open space for Stefani's gum-smacking shouts". Lyrically, the song discusses several different themes; Feminism and "girl power" is made clear in the lyric "It is time for the girl species to grow / I am a Libra / Let's balance the scales", while partying and clubbing is made clear in the lyric "Who got the lighter? / Let's spark the fire". In a 2014 interview with Scott T. Sterling, Williams stated that the "coolest part" of the song was "the sound and direction", particularly the song's lyrics dicscussing "feminism and women standing up for themselves, and standing together". He described the song as inspired by his feeling that "the female species has been suppressed long enough", calling the lyric "Enough's enough. Who's got the lighter? / Let's spark the fire" Stefani's way of demanding more respect for women. In an interview with PopSugar's Lindsay Miller, Stefani identified the song as being "a very personal song" and "my journey" instead of a feminist anthem, but supported Williams' interpretation, saying "I love when people discover their own opinions about a song". Miller described Stefani's hesitation with the word feminism as "com[ing] more from a place of humility than an attempt to avoid controversy".

=== Plagiarism controversy ===
Richard Morrill, Stefani's former hairdresser, sued Stefani and Williams for plagiarism. He claimed that the chorus of "Spark the Fire" was plagiarized from his song "Who's Got My Lightah" (1996), a track which he played for Stefani in the 1990s. Judge Dolly M. Gee ruled in favor of Stefani and Williams, writing "rhyming the words 'light-ah' and 'fi-ah' on beat four of both songs cannot be protected because the last word in the line of a song often rhymes."

== Critical reception ==
"Spark the Fire" received mixed reviews from critics. August Brown, writing for the Los Angeles Times, praised the single for being "a welcome return to the studio styles" of both Stefani and Williams. Hayden Manders of Refinery29 gave the single a positive review, calling it "a throwback for the modern age" and "a song of unity". BreatheHeavy's Jordan Miller praised the song for having "that typical Gwen sass combined with Pharrell’s signature quirky beats and rhythm". Miller chose the lyrics "get off my cloud" as an example of Stefani's vocal delivery being "rap-sing-talking business". However, he later criticized both "Spark the Fire" and "Baby Don't Lie" for being "bland".

With a more divided opinion, Slant Magazine's Alexa Camp called the song "an attempt to repeat those past hits than update the singer's sound for '2015'", but described it as an improvement over the previous single "Baby Don't Lie", while Eliza Berman of Time said that "though it's more repetitive and packs less oozing attitude than "Hollaback Girl", it should serve the club nearly as well." In a negative review, Lucas Villas of AXS described the song as "a dud" and viewed it as "a whole lot of hot air" that failed in its attempt of "rekindling [the] past magic" behind Stefani and Williams' 2005 collaboration "Hollaback Girl". Marc Hogan of Wondering Sound was critical of the song's lyrics, saying "a look at Stefani’s prior discography might suggest there’s not much fuel left for this particular theme", and compared them to her previous work with No Doubt on the song "Start the Fire" from the 2001 album Rock Steady.

== Music video ==
=== Background and synopsis ===
Stefani during the music video, where she is shown sitting atop a cloud emoji.

The music video was released on December 1, 2014 on Stefani's official YouTube account. The video was produced by Stefani's long-time collaborator, Sophie Muller. At the beginning of the video, Stefani is shown floating on a cloud over an animated cityscape. For the video's remainder, Stefani parties in an underground nightclub with friends while groups of animated emojis and animated figures flash on the screen. During the song's bridge before the last chorus, Stefani visually acts out the song's lyrics with the help of several emojis. Scott Lapatine of Stereogum described the video's storyline as "a cartoon universe and an underground club with pop-up video-style graphics flying by"; Lapatine further stated that the video also includes glimpses of "a conspicuous workstation that prints pizza and a Chrysler Fiat 500L".

=== Reception ===
The video received predominantly positive reviews from critics. Eliza Berman of Time magazine gave the video a positive review, saying "it comes to life in the colorful blend of animation and reality". Berman described the video's feminist message as "consist[ed] of bringing together a bunch of attractive dancers dressed in L.A.M.B., burning down the club with confidence". Erin Strecker from Billboard compared the music video to the video for "Baby Don't Lie", stating "Stefani dons black and white in an animated, colorful world".

== Live performances ==
Stefani and Williams performed the song live on the December 1, 2014 episode of The Voice. The performance opened with Stefani floating down to the stage on a huge, animated cloud head and dressed in a powder-blue, cloud-decorated jumpsuit. Williams also joined her on the stage, wearing a dark blue Adidas tracksuit. Stefani then performed the song on New Year's Eve with Carson Daly on December 31, 2014. On February 2, 2015, Stefani performed the song on The Tonight Show Starring Jimmy Fallon, along with a medley of her previous singles "Rich Girl", "What You Waiting For?", and "The Sweet Escape".

== Usage in media ==
In 2014, "Spark the Fire" was used in the advertising of the Fiat's Gran Finale Italy. It is featuring in the second season trailer for Scream Queens.

== Charts ==
Chart performance for "Spark the Fire"
Chart (2014–2015)	Peak position
US Dance Club Songs (Billboard)	29
US Pop Digital Song Sales (Billboard)	38

== Release history ==
Region	Date	Format	Label
France	December 1, 2014	Digital download	Polydor
Italy	December 1, 2014	Digital download	Universal
Spain	December 1, 2014	Digital download	Universal
United States	December 1, 2014	Digital download	Mad Love; Interscope
Germany	January 23, 2015	Digital download	Universal
