= Baby Don't Lie =

Single by Gwen Stefani
- Released: October 20, 2014
- Genre: Electropop; reggae-pop
- Length: 3:21
- Label: Mad Love; Interscope
- Songwriters: Gwen Stefani; Ryan Tedder; Noel Zancanella; Benny Blanco
- Producers: Ryan Tedder; Benny Blanco

Gwen Stefani singles chronology
"Glycerine" (2012)	"Baby Don't Lie" (2014)	"Spark the Fire" (2014)

Music video
- "Baby Don't Lie" on YouTube

"Baby Don't Lie" is a song recorded by American singer and songwriter Gwen Stefani. Written by Stefani, Ryan Tedder, Benny Blanco and Noel Zancanella, and produced by Tedder and Blanco, "Baby Don't Lie" is a midtempo electropop and reggae-pop track. The song was made available for digital download on October 20, 2014, and a day later to mainstream radio stations. It served as Stefani's musical comeback as a solo artist; her previous solo single, "Early Winter", was released in January 2008.

Lyrically, "Baby Don't Lie" discusses insecurities in a relationship. The song received generally mixed to favorable reviews, with some being receptive towards its reggae environment, while a few were ambivalent towards the song, noting that it wasn't as assertive as they expected. Its music video was released on October 21, 2014, and was directed by Stefani's longtime collaborator Sophie Muller, who directed a handful of videos for Stefani's solo career. Intended to be featured on Stefani's third studio album, This Is What the Truth Feels Like, the single, along with others, was scrapped in favor of new material.

== Background and release ==
After releasing two solo albums, Love. Angel. Music. Baby (2004) and The Sweet Escape (2006), Stefani returned to work with her band No Doubt. In 2012 they released their sixth studio album, Push and Shove. During that time, she claimed, "I never need to do that or want to do it again. I'm happy being in No Doubt." However, after an appearance during Pharrell Williams' performance at the 2014 Coachella Valley Music and Arts Festival, Pharrell teased that the rare live appearance from Stefani was the start of a comeback effort for the singer. In July 2014, during an interview for Idolator, record producer Diplo announced that he had produced some songs for her new album. In September, during an interview for MTV News during New York Fashion Week, she confirmed to be working on a solo album and a No Doubt album, stating, "I'm going into the studio tonight with Pharrell [Williams], I'm going to be writing and also just seeing what comes along my way. I've been recording a few things." Williams completed, "When I tell you she's killing it, it's another level."

Later in the same month, music website Popjustice announced that Stefani was going to release a single called "Baby Don't Lie" and it was set to premiere on October 6, 2014. The news was accidentally posted on Interscope's Playiga.com, a site that lists current and upcoming radio releases. Furthermore, the song was reportedly co-written by Ryan Tedder and produced Benny Blanco, while its video was going to be directed by Sophie Muller, with whom Stefani has worked numerous times on videos from No Doubt and her solo career. On October 18, 2014, the song leaked online, ahead of its premiere date, October 19, 2014. The same day, Stefani premiered the single's cover art through her social media. Jocelyn Vena of Billboard described the cover art as "a colorful piece of pop art", which depicts Stefani in front of a clear blue sky, with bright yellow hair and neon pink lipstick, while holding a large gemstone up to her face. The song was released for digital download on October 20, 2014, and it officially impacted mainstream radio on October 21, 2014.

== Composition ==
"Baby Don't Lie" was written by Stefani, Ryan Tedder, Benny Blanco, and Noel Zancanella, with Tedder and Blanco also serving as the song's producers. It is a midtempo electropop and reggae-pop song which begins with Stefani announcing, "Uh huh, here we go," to a rubbery bass line and hand claps. The song also has a hip hop-inflected spoken word breakdown, in which Stefani semi-raps, "You can tell me what you're hidin' boy/And you can tell me if I'm gettin' warm". Lyrically, the song discusses insecurities in a relationship, where Stefani questions her man's love. Nolan Feeney of Time complimented that the song is "about falling in love with someone who's got a few skeletons in their closet." As noted by Spin's Brennan Carley, "Stefani sounds shattered as she sings, "But there's something behind those eyes / Those eyes / That you can't that you can't disguise / Disguise." In the "stomping, infuriatingly catchy" chorus she sings, "Baby don't, baby don't, baby don't lie…/I don't want to cry no longer." Melodically, "Baby Don't Lie" is written in the key of B♭ minor, performed in a common time moderate tempo of 100 beats per minute and follows the sequence B♭m - G♭ - D♭ as its chord progression. Stefani's voice spans two octaves from the lowest note A♭3 to the highest note A♭5.

== Critical reception ==
"Baby Don't Lie" received generally mixed to favorable reviews from music critics, who commended the song's reggae-flavour, but some dismissed Stefani's performance on the track. Sal Cinquemani wrote for Slant Magazine that the single "doesn't venture too far from her band's established template," claiming that "it finds Stefani effortlessly grooving to a reggae-flavored beat and an admittedly catchy hook, complete with her signature yelp, but it hews too close to the sound of No Doubt's slept-on sixth album, Push and Shove." Cinquemani also noted that during the song's breakdown "she feels forced, even for the eternally youthful Stefani, on an otherwise breezy track." Bradley Stern wrote for MuuMuse that the song is "dangerously catchy, and an obvious radio smash upon first listen." Nolan Feeney of Time remarked that, "In less capable hands, 'Baby Don't Lie' would leave a weaker impression, but Stefani and all her vocal idiosyncrasies find a way to make it her own."

Christina Lee from Idolator noted that "Stefani hiccups through her lyrics like Rihanna does in 2012's Sia-written "Diamonds", save for the Love.Angel.Music.Baby-ready sung-rap breakdown". However, Lee observed that, "Considering the song's subject matter, her bold-faced collaborators (Ryan Tedder, Benny Blanco and Noel Zancanella) and, of course, her own track record, Stefani's new song isn't nearly as assertive as I had expected." Brennan Carley of Spin simply called it "a pretty broadly pop effort in line with 2012's No Doubt record, Push and Shove." Lucas Villa of AXS was mixed with the song, writing that "Gwen had always been ahead of the pop curve on her past two albums but 'Baby Don't Lie' sees her on par with everyone else currently on the charts." Mike Ayers of The Wall Street Journal believed that Gwen "doesn't sound too inspired here," while Carolyn Menyes of Music Times disagreed, noting that the song "doesn't seem to have quite the infectious annoyance of some of Stefani's other works, but it's a more solid, well-rounded pop single". Menyes also praised "her signature sassy, slightly reggae-touched vocals, which according to herself, sells the emotions of this song." Steven J. Horowitz from Billboard noted that even though the song "embraces her [Stefani] less experimental side," it misses her "signature bite", rating it three stars out of five.

== Chart performance ==
"Baby Don't Lie" charted moderately in North America after its release. The track debuted at number 35 on the Billboard Adult Pop Songs chart and at number 29 on the Billboard Pop Songs chart, respectively, for the week ending November 8, 2014. In the US, it debuted and peaked at number 46 on the Billboard Hot 100, becoming one of Stefani's highest-charting single entries. On the Canadian Hot 100, it peaked at number 21 for the week ending December 6, 2014 and spent a total of 14 weeks on the chart, before dropping off the chart on the week ending February 14, 2015. In Europe, the track also received moderate success. In Belgium, the track peaked at number 26 on both Ultratip charts, while peaking at number 19 in Finland, number 58 in France, and number 26 in Germany. Elsewhere, the song peaked at the lower positions of several charts, including number 53 in Australia, number 78 in Italy, and number 128 in Russia.

== Music video ==
=== Background and storyline ===
Stefani during the music video, where she is on the yellow brick road.

The music video for the song was directed by Sophie Muller and Weirdcore; Muller has worked with Stefani in numerous videos from her band No Doubt and her solo career. On October 20, 2014, Stefani posted on her Instagram a sneak peek of the behind-the-scenes from the video. It was released on October 21, 2014, the day after the song's release. According to Daniel Kreps from Rolling Stone, the video, which is "a play on The Wizard of Oz, stars a wildly polygonal yellow brick road, an army of dancers and mountains of reoccurring Stefani patterns like bold black-and-white stripes, houndstooth and plenty of pink." Kreps continued the description, commenting that, "in the eye-popping video, Stefani and her dancers are shown with bright pink Beats by Dre headphones around her neck while using the Beats Music app." Jason Lipshutz of Billboard added that the video has Gwen "tiptoeing down a morphing yellow road and showing off the first in her array of polka-dotted outfits," with "a dance troupe eventually arriv[ing] to jazz up the clip a little." The beginning of the music video finds the singer in a gray world, but by the end of the video, the same scenes are now shown in full color.

=== Reception ===
The video received divided critics. Lipshutz was disappointed in it, commenting that "the colorful video lacks the innovation of, say, Stefani's 'What You Waiting For?' visual." James Grebey of Spin stated how he was frustrated with the video's "glitchy, low-resolution land of colorful patterns and shapes," calling it "a jarring rejection of aesthetic design, made all the more confusing when the last third of the video suddenly changes the scenery from a computer generated blunderland to a back alley filled with live-action cars." Jeff Benjamin of Fuse noted that the video is "not wacky and sassy like past Stefani visuals like 'Wind It Up' or 'Hollaback Girl,' but praised the video, writing that it "oozes sophistication while still adding Gwen's signature quirky side with its crazy computer effects." Carolyn Menyes of Music Times was favorable, remarking that the video "fits the song's strong reggae vibes, with Stefani channeling everything that's chaotic and trippy not just about her own genre but also about her single." Bradley Stern was more negative, claiming that the video lacks a storyline, complaining about its resolution and named it a "phoned-in green screen affair with some poorly rendered graphics." Bianca Gracie wrote for Idolator that the video's geometric and graphic animation is nothing new, but praised "the fun dance scene towards the end, which breaks the monotony of the video."

== Track listing ==
- Digital download
1. "Baby Don't Lie" — 3:21
- Digital download (The Remixes)
1. "Baby Don't Lie" (Kaskade & KillaGraham Remix) — 3:01
2. "Baby Don't Lie" (Dave Matthias Remix) — 5:06

== Charts ==
Chart performance for "Baby Don't Lie"
Chart (2014–2015)	Peak position
Australia (ARIA)	53
Belgium (Ultratip Bubbling Under Flanders)	26
Belgium (Ultratip Bubbling Under Wallonia)	26
Canada Hot 100 (Billboard)	21
Canada AC (Billboard)	29
Canada CHR/Top 40 (Billboard)	19
Canada Hot AC (Billboard)	8
CIS Airplay (TopHit)	128
Czech Republic Singles Digital (ČNS IFPI)	30
Denmark (Tracklisten)	26
Finland (Suomen virallinen lista)	19
France (SNEP)	58
Germany (GfK)	26
Hungary (Single Top 40)	35
Hungary (Stream Top 40)	38
Italy (FIMI)	78
Netherlands (Dutch Top 40)	22
Netherlands (Single Top 100)	32
New Zealand (Recorded Music NZ)	36
Romania (Airplay 100)	76
Slovakia Singles Digital (ČNS IFPI)	25
Slovakia Airplay (ČNS IFPI)	71
US Billboard Hot 100	46
US Adult Pop Airplay (Billboard)	23
US Pop Airplay (Billboard)	21

== Certifications ==
Certifications and sales for "Baby Don't Lie"
Region	Certification	Certified units/sales
United States (RIAA)	Gold	500,000^{‡}
^{‡} Sales+streaming figures based on certification alone.

== Release history ==
Country	Date	Format	Label
France	October 20, 2014	Digital download	Universal
Japan	October 20, 2014	Digital download	Universal
Italy	October 20, 2014	Digital download	Universal
Spain	October 20, 2014	Digital download	Universal
United States	October 20, 2014	Digital download	Mad Love; Interscope
United States	October 21, 2014	Contemporary hit radio	Mad Love; Interscope
Italy	November 11, 2014	Contemporary hit radio	Universal
Germany	December 5, 2014	Digital download	Universal
United States	January 6, 2015	Digital download (The Remixes)	Mad Love; Interscope
