= Here This Christmas =

2020 single by Gwen Stefani

Single by Gwen Stefani

from the album You Make It Feel Like Christmas
- Released: October 23, 2020
- Studio: Barefoot Studios (Los Angeles, CA); The Way Station (Beverly Hills, CA)
- Genre: Christmas
- Length: 2:58
- Label: Interscope
- Songwriters: Brent Kutzle; Josh Varnadore; Ryan Tedder
- Producer: Brent Kutzle

Gwen Stefani singles chronology
"Happy Anywhere" (2020)	"Here This Christmas" (2020)	"Let Me Reintroduce Myself" (2020)

Music video
- "Here This Christmas" on YouTube

"Here This Christmas" is a song by American singer and songwriter Gwen Stefani from the 2020 reissued edition of her fourth studio album, You Make It Feel Like Christmas (2017). The song was written and produced by Brent Kutzle, with Ryan Tedder and Josh Varnadore also serving as co-writers. Prior to its release, rumors of new music from Stefani circulated throughout 2020 after releasing "Nobody but You" and "Happy Anywhere", with fiancé Blake Shelton, as singles that year. The former of the three remained a secret until it was released as a single for digital download and streaming on October 23, 2020 by Interscope Records, the same day the rest of the reissued album was distributed. The Hallmark Channel announced that the song would be used in advertisements and played on their SiriusXM radio channel in order to promote their seasonal block of programming called Countdown to Christmas.

"Here This Christmas" is a festive and upbeat Christmas song joined by the sounds of bells, strings, and horns. Additional instrumentation is provided by bass, cello, and electric guitar. The recording process was difficult for Stefani, who felt it was demanding on her vocals. The song's lyrics find her requesting true love for Christmas, as opposed to materialistic items. Music critics deemed the song catchy and it was ultimately included on several lists ranking the best new holiday songs of 2020. However, the song's October release date was criticized. In the United States, the song charted at number five on Billboard's Holiday Digital Song Sales chart. It also entered Radiosoittolista's Finnish Airplay chart at number 33. An accompanying music video was released to Stefani's YouTube channel on November 17, 2020. The clip features Stefani and Tedder working on the song together in a recording studio.

== Background and release ==
Stefani released her fourth studio album You Make It Feel Like Christmas, a collection of six original songs and six covers versions of Christmas standards, in October 2017, through Interscope Records. For the album, she was inspired by her favorite holiday albums from her childhood, such as Vince Guaraldi's A Charlie Brown Christmas (1965) and Emmylou Harris's Light of the Stable (1979). She also worked with American songwriter Justin Tranter and American musician busbee, with the latter of the two also serving as executive producer. You Make It Feel Like Christmas was preceded by the release of lead single "You Make It Feel Like Christmas", a duet with Stefani's then-boyfriend, American singer Blake Shelton. The album was reissued in 2018 with five new bonus tracks, a music video for her cover of "Feliz Navidad" with Chilean singer Mon Laferte, and a new single, "Secret Santa". According to Stefani, the initial 2017 release was successful enough to warrant the new version in 2018.

Having this opportunity to harness the incredible talents of Gwen Stefani and Ryan Tedder in the creation and recording of 'Here This Christmas' is a dream come true and I am confident this single will add a whole new dimension to our seasonal programming event and become an instant holiday hit.

— Michelle Vicary, the executive vice president of programming and network publicity for the Hallmark Channel, commenting on "Here This Christmas".

In 2020, Stefani released two singles with Shelton, "Happy Anywhere" and "Nobody but You". The latter song became Stefani's highest-charting release on the US Billboard Hot 100 since "The Sweet Escape" in 2007. Speculation from music critics of new Stefani material occurred in September 2020, when she began promoting her role as a musical coach on the nineteenth season of the American reality television series The Voice. She teased on October 20, 2020 that new music would be released "really soon". Without prior announcement, a cover of "Sleigh Ride" was released to digital retailers on October 13, 2020. The rest of the album dropped on October 23, with the album's final original song revealed to be "Here This Christmas".

"Here This Christmas" was co-written by Josh Varnadore and OneRepublic bandmates Brent Kutzle and Ryan Tedder. It was also produced by Kutzle. Stefani had previously collaborated with Tedder on her comeback single, "Baby Don't Lie", in 2014. Of the nineteen tracks on the reissue of You Make It Feel Like Christmas, "Here This Christmas" and "Sleigh Ride" are the only two not produced by busbee or Eric Valentine; busbee, who co-wrote eight original songs with Stefani and produced all of the album, died in 2019 after battling glioblastoma. "Here This Christmas" was released for digital download and streaming in the United States as a single on October 23, 2020, through Interscope Records. In its official announcement, Stefani posted to her Instagram account: "Grateful to have worked w [sic] Ryan Tedder on this one". Following the song's release, Kelli Skye Fadroski from the Orange County Register noted how Stefani's career has headed into a "holly jolly direction" over the course of the last several years. A promotional audio video for "Here This Christmas" was uploaded to Stefani's YouTube channel the same day as its digital release. "Here This Christmas" serves as the official theme for the Hallmark Channel's annual seasonal programming block Countdown to Christmas, which broadcasts holiday-themed films and television series leading up to Christmas day. The song and "Sleigh Ride" were featured prominently in advertisements for the block and were released for airplay rotation on the Hallmark Channel SiriusXM radio channel. Philiana Ng from Entertainment Tonight pointed out that Stefani joins Shelton, who had already established a business relationship with Hallmark earlier in 2018.

== Composition and lyrics ==
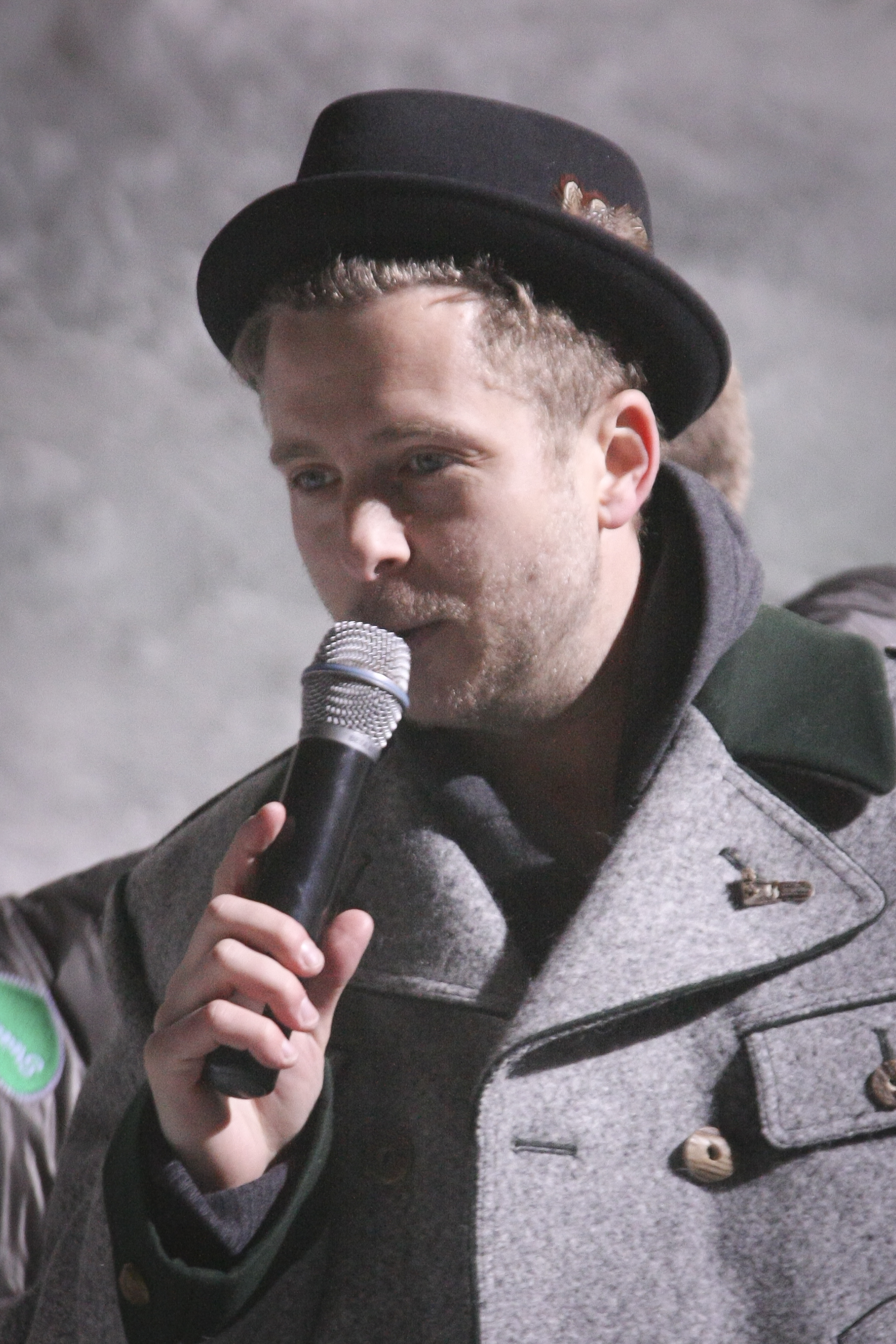
"Here This Christmas" was co-written by American musician Ryan Tedder (shown), who had previously worked with Stefani as a lyricist on "Baby Don't Lie" (2014).

Musically, "Here This Christmas" is an upbeat and "cheery" Christmas song. It utilizes a "skipping drum groove" and features sounds created by various strings, horns, and bells. According to Cathy Padilla from Community Magazine, the song is an "upbeat tune with a toe-tapping beat of sleigh bells" and she attributed this to the song's creative team, which she called impressive. A contributor to Billboard called the song sunny. Despite it taking just one day, the recording process of "Here This Christmas" was "difficult" for Stefani, who commented that Tedder's work on the song required her to sing with a strong vocal range. Because she considered it demanding, she joked that the song would be better suited for The Voice contestants.

"Here This Christmas" is set in the time signature of common time, and has an average tempo of 120 beats per minute. The key of the song is in A-sharp major and it follows the typical setup of verse-chorus-verse-chorus. Stefani's vocal range advances in the chord progressions of A#–Dm–D# in the verses and A#–Dm–Gm–D# in the chorus. Alongside her vocals, Stefani is joined by Varnadore and Laura Cooksey, who contribute as background vocalists. For instruments, the song features Matt Melton on bass, Paul Nelson on cello, Loren Ferard on electric guitar, and Brandon Collins as a strings contractor. Violinists David Angell, David Davidson, and Elizabeth Lamb also perform, and Lamb additionally contributes to the track on viola.

Lyrically, "Here This Christmas" finds Stefani admitting that she prefers love over receiving materialistic gifts on Christmas Day. She reveals the only thing that she wants is to have her significant other "here this Christmas" with her. She also mentions various seasonally appropriate phrases, such as "snow falling, lights, mistletoe, and more". Stefani opens the song by cooing: "Darling, when it's cold outside and I can see the snowflakes falling / I'm staring at the Christmas lights and counting down to when you're calling." In the chorus, Stefani grows sentimental as she admits her desires. During the refrain, she sings: "Don't need presents under the tree / Don't need snow and caroling / I don't need a lot of wishes / I just need you here this Christmas."

== Reception ==
Aynslee Darmon from Entertainment Tonight Canada and USA Today's Gary Dinges both called the song catchy, while Marty Rosenbaum from Radio.com declared that it was a perfect "new theme song" for the holidays. Idolator's Mike Wass wrote: "Of the huge outpouring of seasonal offerings to arrive in the last few years, [You Make It Feel Like Christmas] is one of my favorites. She now adds another layer to that opus" with the song. He called the song a "festive bop" and "as charming a toe-tapper as you're ever likely to find"; he also predicted that it would be heard frequently throughout the 2020 holiday season. Andrea Dresdale from Good Morning America also enjoyed the new single, suggesting that the Hallmark Channel's programming block will become more festive with "Here This Christmas". Stephanie Dube Dwilson, a writer for Heavy, called the song catchy and noted that Stefani's fans seemed pleased by the track. Referring to both the song and the accompanying video, Fadroski called them yet another "winter surprise" from Stefani. Charu Sinha from Vulture disapproved of the song's early release date, joking that Stefani "apparently had no qualms violating the cardinal rule of no-Christmas-music-before-Thanksgiving". Craig Jenkins, from the same publication, also spoke of the song, favorably comparing its sound to Stefani's 2006 single "The Sweet Escape". However, he disliked the inclusion of "Here This Christmas" on the 2020 edition of the parent album, calling it a "cold cash-in".

KSAT's Cody King ranked "Here This Christmas" as the sixth best new Christmas song of 2020 and Billboard contributors featured it within their list of holiday music "you need to know about this season". Tomás Pier from People included the single on his list of 2020 Christmas Songs to "Get Into the Holiday Spirit". Sara Kitnick, a contributor to SheKnows, listed the song in her article titled "You Should Add These 15 New Albums to Your Holiday Playlist Now". Parade's K.L. Connie Wang listed it among the 35 best original Christmas songs within recent years.

=== Commercial performance ===
The same week that You Make It Feel Like Christmas was reissued, "Here This Christmas" appeared on Billboard's Holiday Digital Song Sales component chart in the United States. On the issue dated November 7, 2020, it entered at number five, becoming the third highest new entry after 2020 singles "Under the Mistletoe" by Kelly Clarkson and Brett Eldredge, and "The Thanksgiving Song" by Ben Rector. "Here This Christmas" became Stefani's second-highest entry on the chart – after the album's title track reached number 3 in 2017 – and became the 19th consecutive song from the album to appear on the Holiday Digital Song Sales chart. The song fell off of the chart the following week but re-entered during the week of November 28, 2020 at number 49. It spent a total of two weeks on the Holiday Digital Song Sales chart. Elsewhere, the song reached the Finnish Airplay chart, tracked by Radiosoittolista, where it entered at number 98 during the 2020 holiday season, and reached a peak of number 33 the following year.

== Music video ==
The accompanying music video was released on November 17, 2020, when it was uploaded to Stefani's YouTube Vevo account. The same day, the video was sent a paid download available for purchase via Apple Music. The clip features behind-the-scenes footage of Stefani working on the song with Tedder in a recording studio. To make it appear more festive, "some digital snow is superimposed over footage of Stefani belting the song in the booth". In addition to her typical gold necklace chain reading "Stefani", Stefani wears an additional necklace that displays "Shelton". Randee Dawn from Today provided a positive review of the video, writing: "Gwen is getting us into the holiday spirit!". She pointed out Stefani's "Shelton" necklace and commented: "And in a way, Stefani has worked Shelton directly into the music video, though you never see his face."

== Track listing ==
Digital download/streaming
No.	Title	Length
1.	"Here This Christmas"	2:58

== Credits and personnel ==
Credits adapted from Tidal.

- Gwen Stefani – vocalist
- Brent Kutzle – producer, composer, lyricist
- Ryan Tedder – composer, lyricist
- Josh Varnadore – composer, lyricist, background vocalist
- John Nathaniel – mixer, studio personnel
- Laura Cooksey – background vocalist
- Matt Melton – bass
- Paul Nelson – cello
- Loren Ferard – electric guitar
- Brandon Collins – strings contractor
- Elizabeth Lamb – viola, violin
- David Angell – violin
- David Davidson – violin

== Charts ==
Chart performance for "Here This Christmas"
Chart (2020–2021)	Peak position
Finland Airplay (Radiosoittolista)	33
US Holiday Digital Song Sales (Billboard)	5

== Release history ==
Release dates and formats for "Here This Christmas"
Region	Date	Format(s)	Label	Ref.
United States	October 23, 2020	Digital download; streaming	Interscope	
