= You Make It Feel Like Christmas (disambiguation) =

You Make It Feel Like Christmas is a 2017 Christmas album by American singer Gwen Stefani.

"You Make It Feel Like Christmas" may also refer to:

- "You Make It Feel Like Christmas" (song), the title track from the Gwen Stefani album
- "You Make It Feel Like Christmas", a song by Neil Diamond from his 1992 album The Christmas Album
- Gwen Stefani's You Make It Feel Like Christmas, a 2017 television special
