= Under the Christmas Lights =

Song by Gwen Stefani

from the album You Make It Feel Like Christmas
- Released: October 6, 2017
- Recorded: 2017
- Studio: Barefoot Studios (Los Angeles, CA); The Way Station (Beverly Hills, CA)
- Genre: Christmas; pop
- Length: 2:50
- Label: Interscope
- Songwriter(s): Gwen Stefani; Justin Tranter; busbee
- Producer(s): busbee; Eric Valentine

"Under the Christmas Lights" is a song recorded by American singer and songwriter Gwen Stefani for her fourth studio album, You Make It Feel Like Christmas (2017). It was written by Stefani, Justin Tranter, and busbee, who co-produced the song with Eric Valentine. The song was released alongside the rest of the album on October 6, 2017, through Interscope Records. Details about the track first emerged in August 2017, when the song title appeared as a registered work on BMI and GEMA. "Under the Christmas Lights" is a pop and Christmas song with a doo-wop melody and romantic lyrics.

In terms of critical reception, the song was described as silly but ultimately relatable, lyrically. The song entered Billboard's Holiday Digital Song Sales chart in the United States at number 16. It also appeared on the Rádio Top 100 airplay chart in Slovakia. Stefani performed the song twice live; one performance occurred on The Tonight Show Starring Jimmy Fallon, where she was also the episode's guest. She also sang the song on her 2017 television special, Gwen Stefani's You Make It Feel Like Christmas.

== Background and release ==
Following the release of her third studio album, This Is What the Truth Feels Like (2016), Stefani announced in July 2017 that she had plans to release new music by the end of the year. She did not provide further details, but several publications speculated that Stefani's new material would be Christmas-related due to song titles such as "Under the Christmas Lights", "Christmas Eve", and "You Make It Feel Like Christmas" becoming registered on two music databases, BMI and GEMA. On September 18 that year, she took to her social media accounts and claimed that she "had something big planned for the holidays", and that more information would follow. The next day, Stefani revealed her next studio album, You Make It Feel Like Christmas, and revealed that the title track would be released as the lead single.

Stefani spent much of summer 2017 residing with her fiancé American singer Blake Shelton at his Oklahoma estate. She had already began developing You Make It Feel Like Christmas, and went on a run one morning in search of inspiration. She started envisioning what her own original Christmas song would sound like, and began writing the lyrics to what would later become the album's first song, "Christmas Eve". "Under the Christmas Lights" was written by Stefani, Tranter, and busbee, with busbee and Eric Valentine serving as producers. The song was released for digital download and streaming on October 6, 2017, by Interscope Records, along with the rest of You Make It Feel Like Christmas. "Under the Christmas Lights" serves as one of the album's six original tracks and appears as the eighth track on the standard edition.

== Composition and lyrics ==
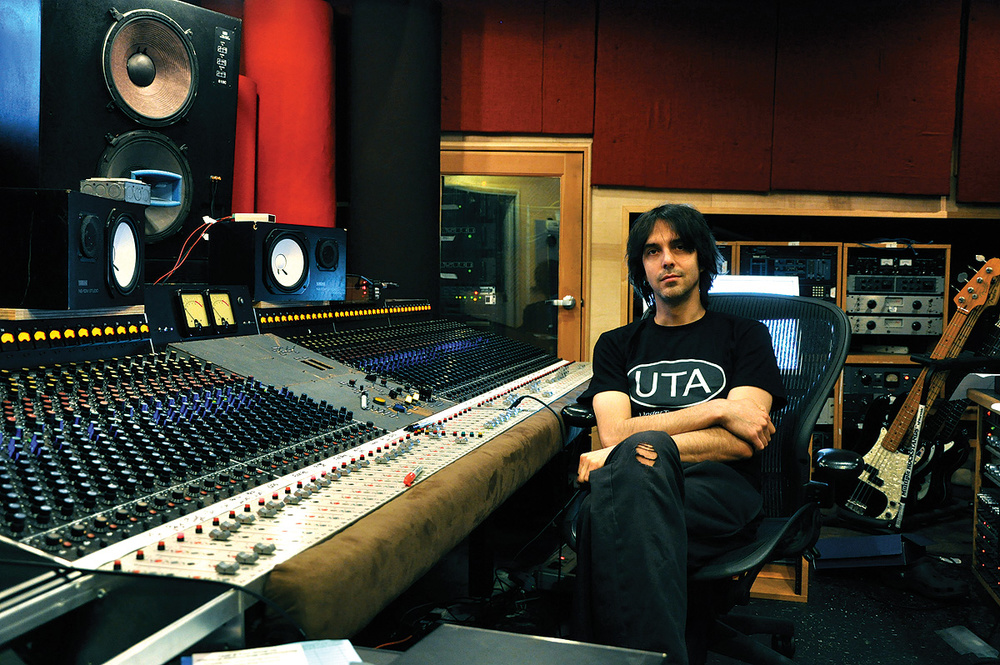
Eric Valentine (shown) produced "Under the Christmas Lights" and several other tracks for You Make It Feel Like Christmas (2017).

"Under the Christmas Lights" is a pop and Christmas song with a doo-wop melody. Many instruments were used in the production of the song, including bass, bass trombone, drums, electric guitar, flugelhorn, flute, piano, piccolo, timpani, trombone, and trumpet. The staff at Rolling Stone wrote that it sounds like a 1960s holiday song, in response to Stefani who said the parent album was inspired by the Christmas music of Cher, Phil Spector, and the Osmonds.

"Under the Christmas Lights" is set in the time signature of common time, and has an average tempo of 120 beats per minute. The key of the song is in D-flat major and it follows the setup of verse-chorus-verse-chorus. Stefani's vocal range advances in the chord progressions of C–G–A#–F in the verses and Am–F–C–G in the chorus. The track was mixed by Dave Clauss and engineered by Valentine. Jonathan Sterling served as assistant engineer, busbee and Dave Way served as lead vocals engineers, and were assisted by Peter Chun. Laura Mace, Monet Owens, and Dolly Sparks provided background vocals for the track with arrangements from Grace Potter.

Lyrically, the song mentions seasonal activities, such as wrapping gifts and beginning traditions with loved ones. She opens the song with "Late night, gotta do the wrapping / I'm running out of tape". With the six original songs on You Make It Feel Like Christmas, many critics believed their lyrical content was inspired by Stefani's relationship with country singer Blake Shelton. In "Under the Christmas Lights", she sings "When it's cold outside, put your arms around me / And we'll countdown to December 25 / I thank God I got you 'cause you're all that I need / Under the Christmas lights, baby you and I".

== Reception ==
Sal Cinquemani from Slant Magazine said that "Under the Christmas Lights" in addition to a few other tracks, made up the "mixed bag" of songs on You Make It Feel Like Christmas; he referred to the song as silly, but equally relatable in terms of lyrical content. Alan Sculley, a writer for the Montgomery Advertiser, included the track with "My Gift Is You" as two of the successful original cuts off of the album.

During the release week of You Make It Feel Like Christmas, "Under the Christmas Lights" appeared on Billboard's Holiday Digital Song Sales component chart in the United States. On the issue dated October 27, 2017, it peaked at number 16, becoming the fifth best-selling song from the album that week. In Slovakia, the song was sent out for airplay rotation, prompting it to enter the Rádio Hot 100 chart. During the final week of 2017, it debuted at number 83 and as the tenth-highest new entry; "Under the Christmas Lights" was also one of three songs by Stefani to chart that particular week, with "You Make It Feel Like Christmas" ranked at number 33 and her cover of "White Christmas" at number 86.

== Live performances ==
"Under the Christmas Lights" was performed twice by Stefani during the 2017 holiday season. Her first appearance was on The Tonight Show Starring Jimmy Fallon on November 21, 2017, when she was also a special guest. She was interviewed by Jimmy Fallon, who asked her questions about recording You Make It Feel Like Christmas among others. She concluded the show by performing the track, and was accompanied by the Roots, the house band for the television series. On her Christmas television special, Gwen Stefani's You Make It Feel Like Christmas, which was broadcast on NBC on December 12, 2017, she performed "Under the Christmas Lights" as the sixth song on the set list. She wore a "Nutcracker-inspired uniform, complete with green sleeves and red bows, plus a little bit of punk flair with plaid add-ons around her waist, fishnets and thigh-high boots"; Emily Krauser from Entertainment Tonight enjoyed the performance, writing "she gave little drummer boys everywhere a run for their money". The performance from the televised special was uploaded to Stefani's official Vevo account on December 30, 2017.

== Credits and personnel ==
Credits adapted from the liner notes of You Make It Feel Like Christmas.

- Gwen Stefani – writer, lead vocals
- Justin Tranter – writer
- busbee – writer, production
- Eric Valentine – production
- Laura Mace – background vocals
- Monet Owens – background vocals
- Dolly Sparks – background vocals
- Sean Hurley – bass
- Ryan Dragon – bass trombone
- Aaron Sterling – drums
- Greg Camp – electric guitar, hand claps
- John Storie – electric guitar, hand claps
- Stewart Cole – flugelhorn, trumpet
- David Moyer – flute, piccolo
- Matthew Musty – percussion, timpani, hand claps
- Patrick Warren – piano
- Danny Levin – trombone
- Jamie Hovorka – trumpet

== Charts ==
Chart performance for "Under the Christmas Lights"
Chart (2017)	Peak position
Slovakia (Rádio Top 100)	83
US Holiday Digital Song Sales (Billboard)	16
