= Christmas Eve (Gwen Stefani song) =

2017 song by Gwen Stefani

Song by Gwen Stefani

from the album You Make It Feel Like Christmas
- Released: October 6, 2017
- Recorded: 2017
- Studio: Barefoot Studios (Los Angeles, CA); The Way Station (Beverly Hills, CA)
- Genre: Christmas
- Length: 3:19
- Label: Interscope
- Songwriters: Gwen Stefani; Justin Tranter; busbee
- Producers: busbee; Eric Valentine

Audio video
- "Christmas Eve" on YouTube

"Christmas Eve" is a song by American singer and songwriter Gwen Stefani from her fourth studio album, You Make It Feel Like Christmas (2017). The song was written by Stefani, Justin Tranter, and busbee, with the latter of the three handling production alongside Eric Valentine. It was the first song conceived for the album, and "originated from a run Stefani took in rural Oklahoma. Details about the song first emerged in August 2017, when its title appeared as a registered work on two global music databases. The song a slow-burning Christmas ballad with lyrics that reference the holiday season.

"Christmas Eve" was described by Stefani as both a Christmas song and a "miracle song". One reviewer noted that Stefani sounded happy on the album's original tracks, including the song, and cited her relationship with Shelton as evidence why. The song entered Billboard's Holiday Digital Song Sales chart in the United States at number 20. It has since been performed by Stefani on two occasions, including live on NBC's Today during a mini concert and on the 2017 American holiday special Gwen Stefani's You Make It Feel Like Christmas. Both performances were eventually uploaded to Stefani's YouTube channel.

On October 6, 2017, the same day as the song's release on You Make It Feel Like Christmas, Stefani's fiancé American singer Blake Shelton released a cover of "Christmas Eve" under the same title for the 2017 reissue of his seventh studio album, Cheers, It's Christmas (2012). He received a writing credit for his version, and Scott Hendricks produced the song. Shelton mentioned how the original was his favorite song on Stefani's album, resulting in him recording his own take on the track, which she approved. Child patients from the Monroe Carell Jr. Children's Hospital at Vanderbilt serve as background vocalists on the song. The version reached number 41 on the US Holiday Digital Song Sales chart and appeared on the 2019 version of the compilation album, Now That's What I Call Country Christmas.

== Background and release ==
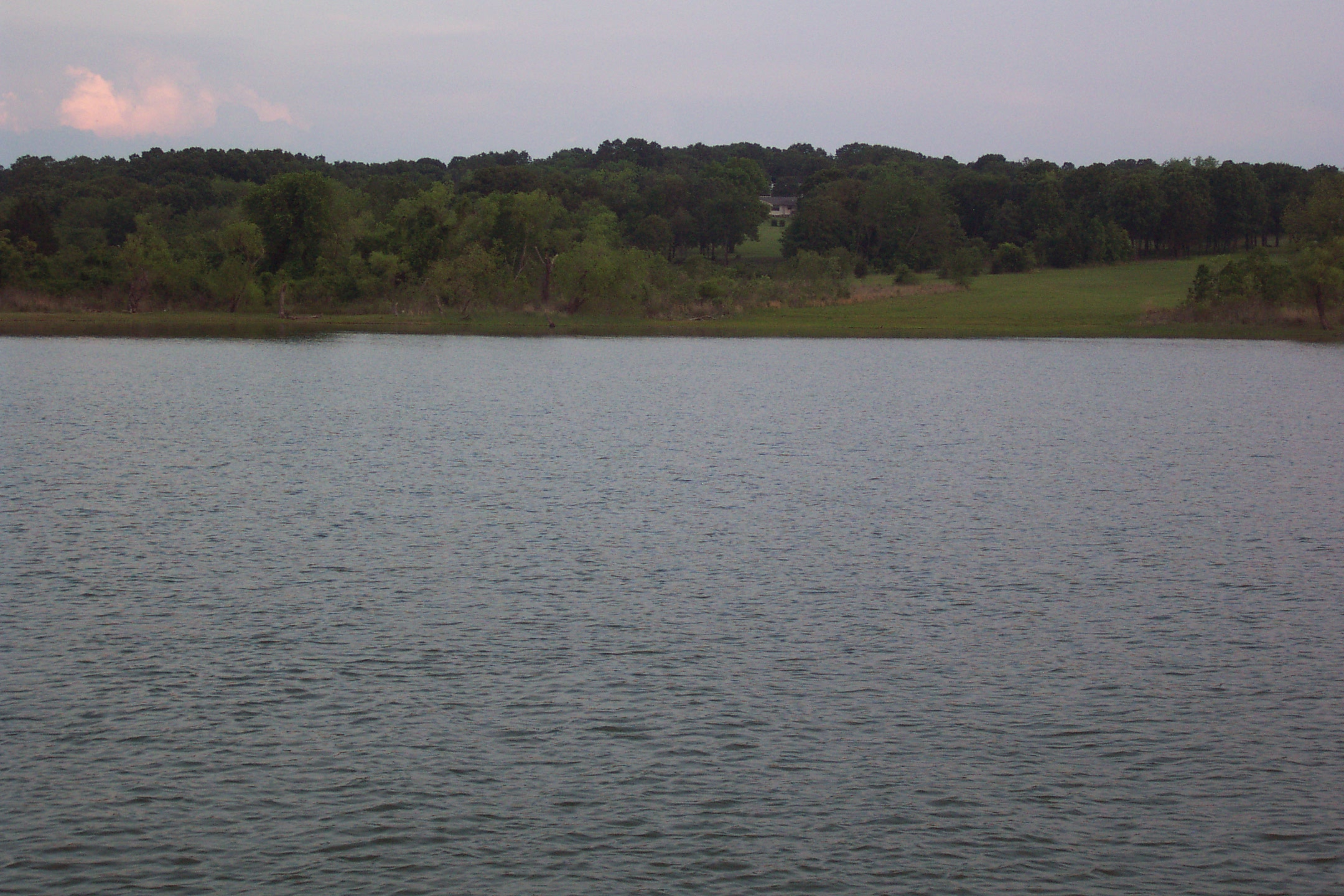
Stefani conceived "Christmas Eve" while on a nature run in the Texoma region of Oklahoma (shown).

Following the release of her third studio album This Is What the Truth Feels Like (2016), Stefani announced in July 2017 that she had plans to release new music by the end of the year. She did not provide further details, but several publications speculated in August 2017 that Stefani's new material would be Christmas-related due to song titles such as "Christmas Eve", "Under the Christmas Lights", and "You Make It Feel Like Christmas" becoming registered on the two music databases, BMI and GEMA. On September 18, 2017, she took to her social media accounts and claimed that she "had something big planned for the holidays", and that more information would follow. The next day, Stefani announced her next studio album, You Make It Feel Like Christmas, and revealed that the title track would be released as the lead single.

Stefani spent the summer months of 2017 residing with her fiancé American singer Blake Shelton at his rural Oklahoma estate, located in the Texoma region of the state. She had already commenced working on You Make It Feel Like Christmas, and went on a run one morning to look for inspiration. Stefani started envisioning what her own original Christmas song would sound like, and began writing the lyrics to what would later become "Christmas Eve". Upon returning to Shelton at the estate, she finished the song on her cell phone. It became the first song completed for the parent album. In an interview on The Tonight Show Starring Jimmy Fallon, Stefani explained that she wrote the chorus to the song on the trail as she passed a wildebeest.

"Christmas Eve" was written by Stefani, Tranter, and busbee, with busbee and Eric Valentine serving as the producers. The song was released for digital download and streaming on October 6, 2017, by Interscope Records, as part of You Make It Feel Like Christmas. "Christmas Eve" serves as one of the album's six original tracks and appears as the twelfth and closing track on the standard edition. A promotional audio video for "Christmas Eve" that uses the song's cover artwork was released to Stefani's Vevo account on YouTube. In a December 21, 2017 article, People falsely reported that Shelton duetted with Stefani on "Christmas Eve", instead of stating he recorded his own version.

== Music and lyrics ==
Musically, "Christmas Eve" is a slow-burning Christmas ballad. Pip Ellwood-Hughes, a contributor for Entertainment Focus, opined that Stefani's inspiration behind tracks like "Christmas Eve" was derived from her relationship with Shelton and "it's clear that Stefani is very happy in her personal life right now". In the official press release for "Christmas Eve", Stefani herself referred to it as a Christmas song and a "miracle song". Various musicians contribute to the song's instrumentation; Patrick Warren plays piano and keyboards on the track, Sean Hurley contributes bass, Aaron Sterling serves as a drummer, and others play the cello, electric guitar, and percussion. A group of 4 violists and 10 violinists also perform on "Christmas Eve".

According to its sheet music, "Christmas Eve" is set in the time signature of common time, and has a moderately slow tempo of 78 beats per minute. The song is composed in the key of A major and it follows the setup of a verse, followed by chorus-verse-chorus and a post-chorus. It opens with a choir harmonizing to the chord progression of A-D-F#m-D-E-F#m-E. Throughout the song's two verses, Stefani's vocal range advances in the progression of A-D-A-E-A-E; during the refrains, she transitions to A-D-A-D-A-E. The song was mixed by Dave Clauss and engineered by Valentine, who was assisted by Jonathan Sterling. busbee and Dave Way served as engineers for the lead vocals and were assisted by Peter Chun. Laura Mace, Monet Owens, and Dolly Sparks provided background vocals for the track, with arrangements from Grace Potter.

During the final week leading up to Christmas Day 2017, Stefani guest hosted a seasonal radio show on TuneIn and shared the meanings and inspiration behind several of the songs on the album. On the broadcast, Stefani referred to "Christmas Eve" as a sort of future quintessential Christmas song for her family's holiday season. She detailed the origin of the song: "I was out for a run. It was this gorgeous day, and I was praying, and this song just came to me. The chorus just came to me." During the song's refrain, Stefani sings: "All over the world, the angels sing / But I'm feeling lost, can you save me? / I'm looking for you on Christmas Eve."

== Reception ==
Ellwood-Hughes from praised "Christmas Eve", calling it a "beautiful ballad that showcases Stefani's distinctive voice", and summarized its position among the album's six original works: "It's no one-off either as all of the originals on the record are really strong."

During its first week of eligibility, "Christmas Eve" appeared on Billboard's Holiday Digital Song Sales component chart in the United States. On the issue dated October 27, 2017, the song peaked at number 20 on Billboard's Holiday Digital Song Sales component chart in the United States, becoming the sixth highest-charting song from You Make It Feel Like Christmas that week.

== Live performances ==
"Christmas Eve" was performed twice by Stefani during the 2017 holiday season. As part of a promotional campaign for You Make It Feel Like Christmas, Stefani appeared as a guest or performed on various television series in the US. On the November 20, 2017 episode of NBC's Today, Stefani was featured as a guest and performed "Christmas Eve", "When I Was a Little Girl", and her cover of "Santa Baby" to the studio audience. For the appearance, she wore a sleeveless white gown adorned by a dangly feather boa and sparkly jewelry. The same day, the taping of her mini concert was posted to Stefani's official YouTube channel and her separate Vevo account.

The second time Stefani sang "Christmas Eve", she performed it on her Christmas television special Gwen Stefani's You Make It Feel Like Christmas, which was broadcast to NBC on December 12, 2017. She performed the song immediately before the set's final track, her cover of "White Christmas", and Emily Krauser from Entertainment Tonight noted how the performance seemed to assist in slowing down the show naturally. For "Christmas Eve", Stefani wore a "strapless, tiered red lace dress" created by Turkish fashion designer Nedret Taciroğlu for her Nedo collection; Krauser said her dress "lit up the stage". The full performance from Stefani's televised special was uploaded to her YouTube channel on December 30, 2017.

== Credits and personnel ==
Credits adapted from the liner notes of You Make It Feel Like Christmas.

- Gwen Stefani – lead vocals, writer
- Justin Tranter – writer
- busbee – writer, producer, piano
- Eric Valentine – producer
- Laura Mace – background vocals
- Monet Owens – background vocals
- Dolly Sparks – background vocals
- Sean Hurley – bass
- Alisha Bauer – cello
- Richard Dodd – cello
- Vanessa Freebairn-Smith – cello
- Aaron Sterling – drums
- Greg Camp – electric guitar
- John Storie – electric guitar
- Patrick Warren – keyboards, piano
- Matt Musty – percussion
- Matthew Funes – viola
- Leah Katz – viola
- Darrin McCann – viola
- Kathryn Reddish – viola
- Charles Bisharat – violin
- Daphne Chen – violin
- Mario DeLeon – violin
- Eric Gorfain – violin
- Songa Lee – violin
- Natalie Leggett – violin
- Robin Olson – violin
- Joel Pargman – violin
- Michele Richards – violin
- John Wittenberg – violin

== Charts ==
Chart performance for "Christmas Eve"
Chart (2017)	Peak position
US Holiday Digital Song Sales (Billboard)	20

== Blake Shelton version ==
"Christmas Eve"

Song by Blake Shelton

from the album Cheers, It's Christmas
- Released: October 6, 2017
- Recorded: 2017
- Genre: Christmas
- Length: 3:42
- Label: Warner Bros. Nashville
- Songwriters: Gwen Stefani; Justin Tranter; busbee; Blake Shelton
- Producer: Scott Hendricks

=== Development and release ===
On October 2, 2012, Shelton released Cheers, It's Christmas, his seventh studio album and first full-length Christmas album. The album featured collaborations with his then-wife Miranda Lambert, among others, and contained three Shelton-penned original songs, including "Time for Me to Come Home". The album was reissued in 2015 and pressed as an LP record, and also re-released as a charity album on CD for the American department store chain Kohl's. In 2017, Warner Bros. Nashville announced that Cheers, It's Christmas would be reissued as a deluxe edition with a new cover artwork and three previously non-included bonus tracks. The new version of the album featured his 2016 single "Savior's Shadow", a newly recorded cover of "Two-Step 'Round the Christmas Tree", and a cover of Stefani's "Christmas Eve". Shelton's version of the song of the same title charted on Billboard's Holiday Digital Song Sales component chart the same week that Stefani's debuted. It peaked at number 41 for the issue dated October 27, 2017, the same week that his duet with Stefani, "You Make It Feel Like Christmas", reached a new peak of number 4 on the chart.

Shelton referred to "Christmas Eve" as his favorite track from You Make It Feel Like Christmas. The deluxe edition of Cheers, It's Christmas, which includes the song as the album's seventeenth and closing track, was released for digital download and streaming on October 6, 2017 by Warner Bros. Nashville, the same day as the release of You Make It Feel Like Christmas. The cover credits Stefani, Tranter, busbee, and the addition of Shelton as songwriters, while Shelton's long-time collaborator Scott Hendricks is credited as the sole producer. Stefani reacted positively to Shelton's decision to cover "Christmas Eve", admitting that she thinks it is the first time a singer decided to cover her song. On the 2019 edition of the compilation album Now That's What I Call Country Christmas, Shelton's cover is included as the opening track.

In contrast to Stefani's version of the song, Shelton's features guest vocals from a group of children. The group of singers are patients from the Monroe Carell Jr. Children's Hospital at Vanderbilt that is located in Nashville, Tennessee. According to its sheet music, the version is set in the time signature of common time, and has a moderately slow tempo of 80 beats per minute. The song is composed in the key of E-flat major and it follows Stefani's original music structure, with the addition of a choir-backed introduction. The children singers begin performing during the intro. A full orchestra backed the song and Charles Judge, a member of the production team for the album, contributed with additional instrumentation on keyboards and piano.

=== Credits and personnel ===
Credits adapted from Tidal.

- Blake Shelton – writer
- Gwen Stefani – writer
- Justin Tranter – writer
- busbee – writer
- Scott Hendricks – producer, digital editor
- Charles Judge – arranger, conductor, keyboards, piano
- Bill Appleby – engineer
- Ben O'Neill – engineer
- Herb Shucher – engineer
- Todd Tidwell – engineer
- Drew Bollman – audio engineer, mixing engineer, recording engineer
- Chandler Harrod – audio engineer, recording engineer
- Justin Niebank – audio engineer, mixing engineer, recording engineer
- Tommy Vicari – audio engineer, recording engineer
- Hank Williams – mastering engineer
- Nick Spezia – assistant engineer
- Chris Ashburn – assistant overdub engineer
- Ben Phillips – digital editor, drums
- Perry Coleman – backing vocals
- Carolyn Dawn Johnson – backing vocals
- Miranda Lambert – backing vocals
- Ashley Monroe – backing vocals
- Angaleena Presley – backing vocals
- Dorothy Shackleford – backing vocals
- Bryan Sutton – acoustic guitar
- Dan Higgins – alto saxophone, flute
- Joel Peskin – baritone saxophone
- Rob Byus – bass guitar
- Craig Nelson – bass guitar
- Glenn Worf – bass guitar
- John Mitchell – bassoon
- Paul Cohen – cello
- Erika Duke – cello
- Stephen Erdody – cello
- Giovanna Moraga-Clayton – cello
- Roger Lebow – cello
- Kim Scholes – cello
- Gebe Cipirano – clarinet
- Phil O'Connor – clarinet
- Chuck Berghofer – double bass
- Geoff Osika – double bass
- Dave Stone – double bass
- Mike Valerio – double bass
- Tracy Broussard – drums, percussion
- Bob Mater – drums, percussion
- David Baldwin – electric guitar
- Brent Mason – electric guitar
- Beau Tackett – electric guitar
- Aubrey Haynie – fiddle
- Julie Gigante – first violin
- Steve Kujala – flute
- Brian O'Connor – horn
- Stephanie O'Keefe – horn
- Danielle Ondarza – horn
- Brad Warnaar – horn
- Gordon Mote – keyboards, piano
- Earl Dumler – oboe
- Paul Franklin – pedal steel guitar
- Brian Scanlon – tenor saxophone
- Nick Lane – trombone
- Charlie Morillas – trombone
- Chuck Findley – trumpet
- Rob Brophy – viola
- Caroline Buckman – viola
- Gina Coletti – viola
- Darrin McCann – viola
- Erik Rynearson – viola
- Mike Whitson – viola
- Armen Anassian – violin
- Charlie Bisharat – violin
- Bruce Dukov – violin
- Eric Gorfain – violin
- Jackie Brand – violin
- Nina Evtuhov – violin
- Tammy Hatwan – violin
- Amy Hershberger – violin
- Maia Jasper – violin
- Ana Landauer – violin
- Serena McKinney – violin
- Cheryl Norman-Brick – violin
- Grace Oh – violin
- Sid Page – violin
- Joel Pargman – violin
- Radu Pieptu – violin
- Anatoly Rosinsky – violin

=== Charts ===
Chart performance for "Christmas Eve"
Chart (2017)	Peak position
US Holiday Digital Song Sales (Billboard)	41
