= Secret Santa (song) =

Single by Gwen Stefani

from the album You Make It Feel Like Christmas
- Released: November 30, 2018
- Recorded: 2018
- Studio: Barefoot Studios (Los Angeles, CA); The Way Station (Beverly Hills, CA)
- Genre: Christmas; pop
- Length: 3:26
- Label: Interscope
- Songwriters: Gwen Stefani; Justin Tranter; busbee
- Producers: busbee; Eric Valentine

Gwen Stefani singles chronology
"Santa Baby" (2017)	"Secret Santa" (2018)	"Nobody but You" (2020)

Audio video
- "Secret Santa" on YouTube

"Secret Santa" is a song by American singer Gwen Stefani for the 2018 reissue of her fourth studio album, You Make It Feel Like Christmas (2017). It was written by Stefani, Justin Tranter, and busbee while production was handled by busbee and Eric Valentine. The song was sent to Italian radio stations for airplay on November 30, 2018 as the second single in Italy and the album's third overall. It serves as one of two previously unreleased original tracks on the reissued album. "Secret Santa" is a Christmas pop ballad accompanied by an acoustic guitar and castanets. It contains flirtatious lyrics and metaphors that reference the Christmas tradition of Secret Santa.

Critically, "Secret Santa" was noted as an adult-oriented Christmas song; Stefani compared the song to the 1953 single "Santa Baby". One music critic felt it helped enhance the parent album's track listing and was a Christmas crowd pleaser. In the United States, "Secret Santa" was the deluxe edition's most successful song on Billboard's Holiday Digital Song Sales component chart. It debuted and peaked at number 17 in November 2018 and became one of sixteen consecutive top 40 entries for Stefani. Italian singer-songwriter Tiziano Ferro released a cover of "Secret Santa" to his Instagram account on Christmas Eve in 2018.

== Background and recording ==
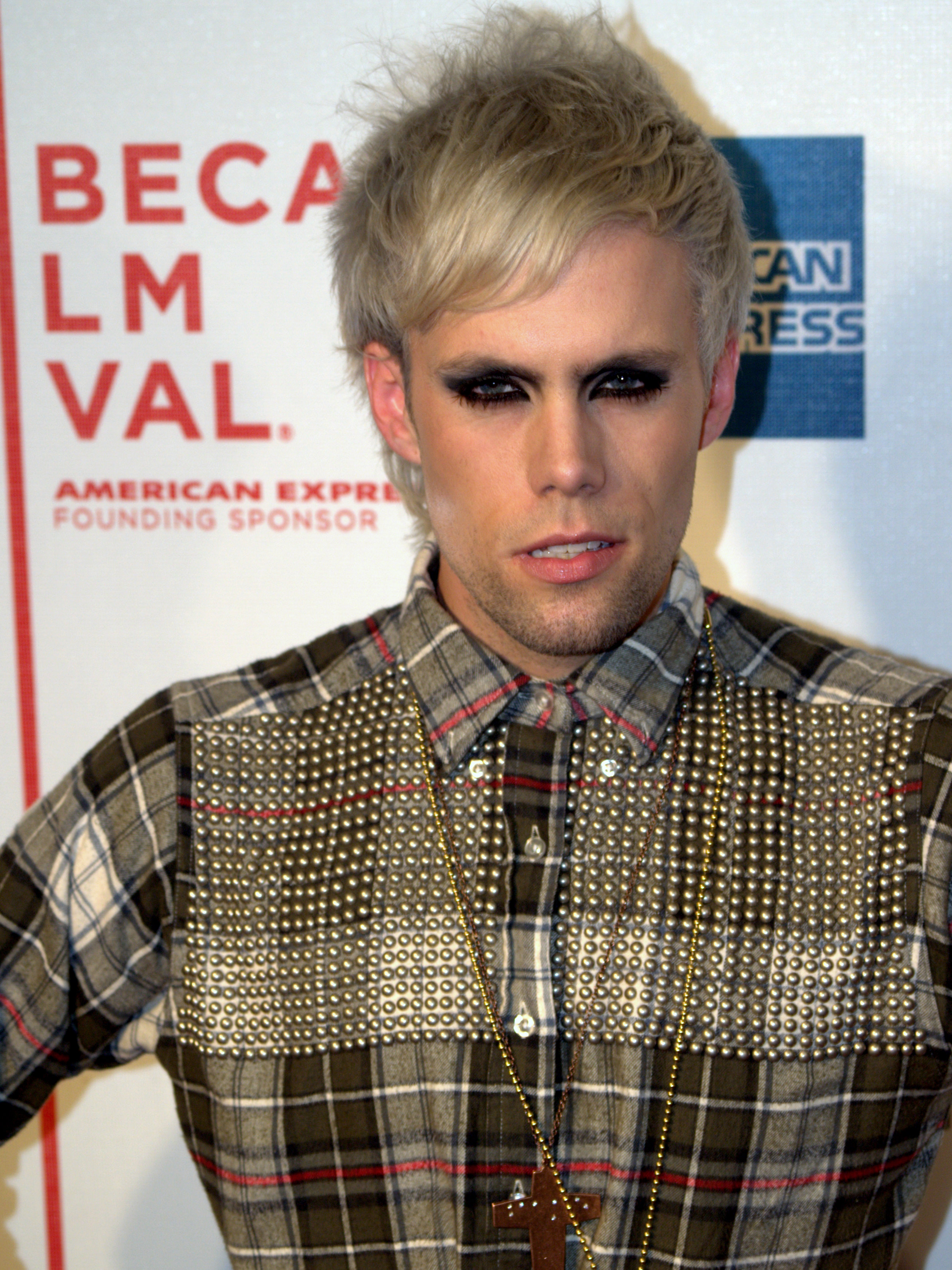
Stefani co-wrote "Secret Santa" with American singer-songwriter Justin Tranter (shown).

In October 2017, Gwen Stefani released her first Christmas album, You Make It Feel Like Christmas, a collection of six original songs and six covers of Christmas standards. Before the holiday season, the singer took to her social media accounts in September 2018 to announce a deluxe version of the album due for release on October 26. According to Stefani, the 2017 release was successful enough to warrant the addition of new tracks. Handled by Interscope Records, the reissue features five new songs, including two originals – "Cheer for the Elves" and "Secret Santa" – composed by Stefani, Justin Tranter, and Busbee.

Alongside the deluxe edition release of You Make It Feel Like Christmas, "Secret Santa" was made available for digital consumption on October 26, 2018. In Italy, the song was marketed as a single and distributed for nationwide airplay on November 30 of the same year. It serves as the second Italian single and third overall from You Make It Feel Like Christmas; in Italy, her cover of “Santa Baby” served as the album's lead single, whereas the title track was marketed as the first in the United States.

On December 24, 2018, Italian singer-songwriter Tiziano Ferro released a cover of "Secret Santa" to his official Instagram account. The video's caption read: "Times change, but my love and gratitude for [my fans] does not. My friends, I hope you have a fantastic Christmas."

== Composition and lyrics ==
"Secret Santa" is a romantic Christmas pop ballad. The song's beat contains overlays of an acoustic guitar and castanets arrangements. The production was handled by Busbee and Eric Valentine, the two producers for the entirety of You Make It Feel Like Christmas. Additional instrumentation for the song was provided by a full orchestra, consisting of instruments such as drums, keyboards, trombones, trumpets, strings, violas, and violins. "Secret Santa" was engineered by Valentine and mixed by Dave Clauss. Jonathan Sterling served as assistant engineer whereas Busbee and Dave Way served as lead vocals engineers with assistance from Peter Chun. Laura Mace, Monet Owens, and Dolly Sparks provided background vocals for the track with arrangements from Grace Potter. During the songwriting process, Stefani was determined to create a "classic Christmas carol" that would become a repeat listen year after year; from her sessions with Tranter and Busbee, she created eight original songs, with "Secret Santa" being one of them.

Lyrically, the song tells the story of a couple who are preparing to exchange Christmas presents with each other as part of the Secret Santa Christmas tradition, but have decided to complete the swap intimately and at midnight. When interviewed during a Billboard podcast in 2018, Stefani herself described the song as better suited for adults. She said: "['Secret Santa'] sort of reminds me of like a 'Santa Baby' lane ... in the sense of like a little sexy song." Within the chorus, Stefani sings: "Let's play Secret Santa in the dark / Don't tell anybody where we are / There's no limit to the ways that we can celebrate / A midnight gift exchange of heart".

== Reception ==
Giulia Ciavarelli, from the Italian magazine TV Sorrisi e Canzoni, described "Secret Santa" as the perfect Christmas party anthem. In regards to its addition on the deluxe edition of You Make It Feel Like Christmas, Ciavarelli suggested that it does not change the album's tone, but rather enriches it. Keith Caulfield and Katie Atkinson, both writers for Billboard, described "Secret Santa" as the exact opposite of the deluxe edition's other new song ("Cheer for the Elves"), writing that it "goes in a more grown-up direction".

In the United States, "Secret Santa" did not enter Billboard's Digital Songs chart, but rather the Holiday Digital Song Sales component chart. On the edition for the week ending November 10, 2018, the song debuted and peaked at number 17, becoming the highest new entry from the 2018 deluxe edition of You Make It Feel Like Christmas and one of five tracks to be ranked on that particular issue. It was her seventh highest-peaking song and one of sixteen consecutive top 40 hits on the chart.

== Credits and personnel ==
Credits adapted from the liner notes of You Make It Feel Like Christmas.

- Gwen Stefani – lead vocals, lyrics
- Justin Tranter – lyrics
- busbee – lyrics, production
- Eric Valentine – engineering, production
- Peter Slocombe – baritone saxophone, tenor saxophone
- Sean Hurley – bass
- Ryan Dragon – bass trombone, tenor trombone
- Matthew Musty – drums
- Greg Camp – guitar
- John Storie – guitar
- Patrick Warren – keyboards, synth strings
- Blair Sinta – percussion
- Eric Hughes – trombone
- Daniel Fornero – trumpet
- Dave Richards – trumpet
- Mike Rocha – trumpet
- Rob Moose – viola, violin
- Adam Ayan – mastering
- Dave Clauss – mixing
- Laura Mace – background vocals
- Monet Owens – background vocals
- Dolly Sparks – background vocals

== Charts ==
Chart performance for "Secret Santa"
Chart (2018)	Peak position
US Holiday Digital Song Sales (Billboard)	17

== Release history ==
Release dates and formats for "Secret Santa"
Region	Date	Format	Label	Ref.
United States	October 26, 2018	Digital download	Interscope	
Italy	November 30, 2018	Contemporary hit radio	Universal Music Group	
