= My Gift Is You =

2017 song by Gwen Stefani

- Cover used for the 2019 version with The Voice contestant Rose Short

Song by Gwen Stefani

from the album You Make It Feel Like Christmas
- Released: October 6, 2017
- Recorded: 2017
- Studio: Barefoot Studios (Los Angeles, CA); The Way Station (Beverly Hills, CA)
- Genre: Christmas; pop-soul
- Length: 2:51
- Label: Interscope
- Songwriter(s): Gwen Stefani; Justin Tranter; Busbee
- Producer(s): Busbee; Eric Valentine

"My Gift Is You" is a song by American singer and songwriter Gwen Stefani from her fourth studio album, You Make It Feel Like Christmas (2017). It was released digitally on October 6, 2017, along with the rest of the parent album, through Interscope Records. The track was written by Stefani, Justin Tranter, and Busbee while production was handled by Busbee and Eric Valentine. Musically, the track is a Christmas song that contains elements of pop-soul music.

The lyrics revolve around Stefani's relationship with boyfriend Blake Shelton and deal with choosing true love over materialism during the holiday season. Several music critics listed "My Gift Is You" as one of the highlights included on the parent album. Commercially, it peaked at number six on Billboard's Holiday Digital Song Sales chart in the United States. "My Gift Is You" was performed during the 2017 NBC television special Gwen Stefani's You Make It Feel Like Christmas.

== Background and recording ==
Throughout 2017, Gwen Stefani recorded new music with various musicians. In July of the same year, the singer announced in a press statement that she planned to release the new music in the near future. The title of several tracks first leaked on August 2, 2017, when they appeared as published works on the official website for GEMA, a German music database. Due to some of the revealed song titles that mistakenly appeared, multiple music critics suggested that the singer's new music may be among material for a holiday album. "My Gift Is You" was included on the list of leaked titles, in addition to album tracks "Christmas Eve" and "You Make It Feel Like Christmas". The song was officially revealed as part of the parent album on September 18 when Stefani unveiled its title, You Make It Feel Like Christmas, in addition to its track listing and the lead single.

"My Gift Is You" was written by Stefani, Justin Tranter, and Busbee while production was handled by Busbee and Eric Valentine. Stefani had expressed interest in collaborating with Busbee, who also serves as an executive producer for the parent album, ever since she had heard his work on Pink's "Try" in 2012. Tranter was also enlisted as a songwriter for the album due to his ability to "write a hit". The song was made available for purchase as a digital download on October 6, 2017, along with the rest of You Make It Feel Like Christmas, through Interscope Records.

== Composition and lyrics ==
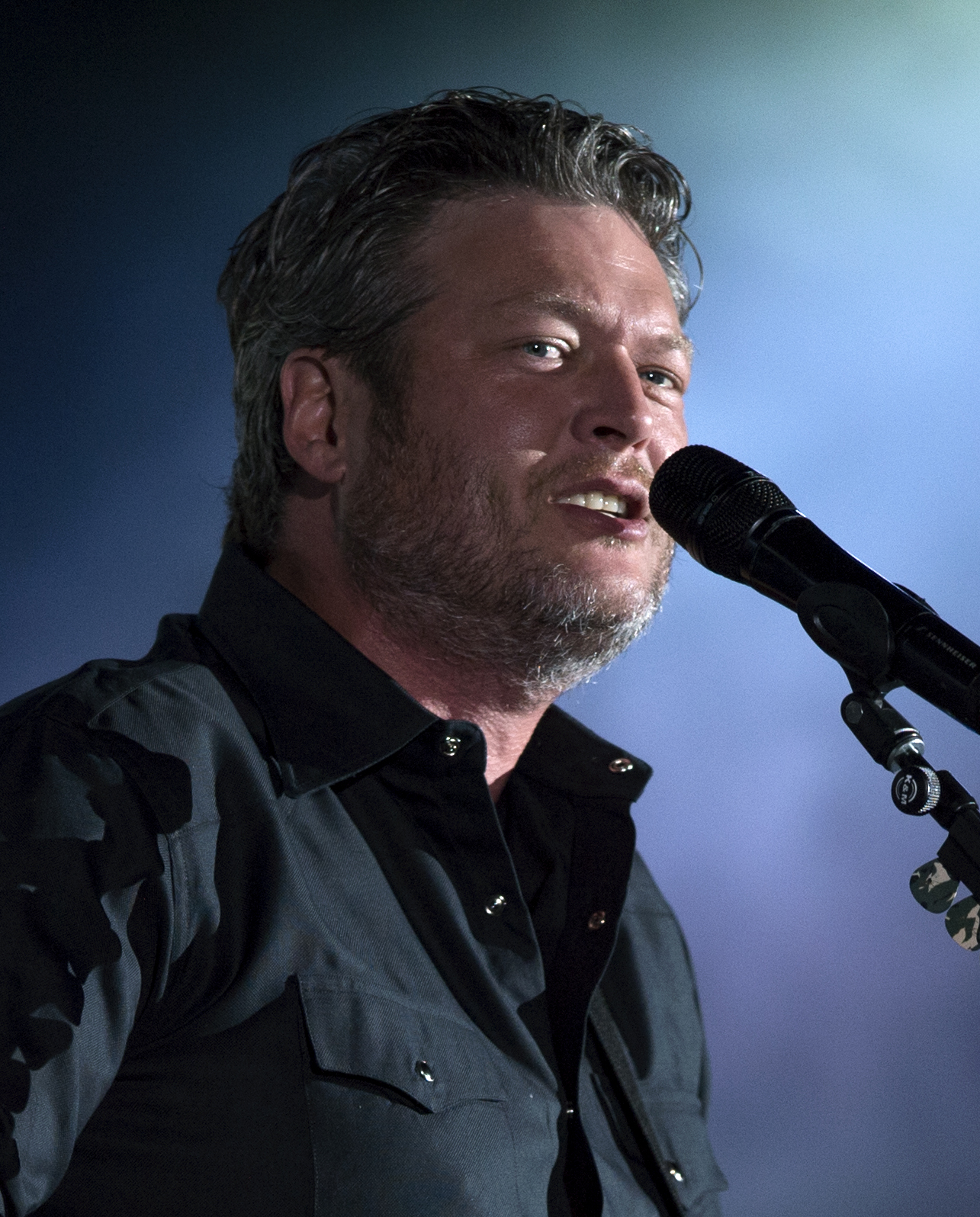
Several of the songs on You Make It Feel Like Christmas, including "My Gift Is You", allude to Stefani's relationship with Blake Shelton.

"My Gift Is You" is a Christmas and pop-soul song that lasts two minutes and 51 seconds. Musically, it is a blend of the sound of classic Christmas songs with the contemporary style of more modern ones. According to Janine Lano from The Highlander, the song's beat is similar in sound to the one found in Ben E. King's 1961 single "Stand by Me", due to the similarities in "poignant bass notes" that help create a sense of the holiday season.

As a whole, You Make It Feel Like Christmas contains various songs alluding to Stefani's relationship with boyfriend Blake Shelton. Rachel McRady from Entertainment Tonight suggested that even when considering their previously released duet ("You Make It Feel Like Christmas"), "My Gift Is You" may be the "most telling tune" on the parent album. Stefani sings: "I can't wait to give all my lovin' to my best friend / All I want is you to take my love and give it back again". While crooning, she says: "Don't need no money. Don't need a thing / I don't even need a wedding ring / All I need is love and the truth / And I got it, my gift is you". In these lyrics, Stefani "disregards material possessions [in favor of] Christmas" and "flaunts her newfound love with [Shelton]".

== Reception ==
"My Gift Is You" was selected as a standout track by several music critics. Sal Cinquemani from Slant Magazine singled out the track as a highlight on You Make It Feel Like Christmas, describing it as "Stefani's obligatory entry in the canon of contemporary holiday songs in which the singer eschews all things material". Furthermore, he called the track "surprisingly capable" and wrote "like the album as a whole, [it] at least makes it feel like Christmas". Additionally, Lano listed "My Gift Is You" as one of the four best tracks on the record. AllMusic's Stephen Thomas Erlewine noted that the song, in addition to album tracks "Never Kissed Anyone with Blue Eyes Before You" and "When I Was a Little Girl", is too modern in order to be reminiscent of a Christmas tune: "'My Gift Is You' is a love song bearing the faintest hint of mistletoe".

"My Gift Is You" appeared on one seasonal Billboard component charts in the United States. On the Holiday Digital Song Sales chart, which tracks the best-selling digital holidays songs of the week, it entered and peaked at number six during the week of October 28, 2017. Out of all of the songs that appear on You Make It Feel Like Christmas, "My Gift Is You" was the highest-peaking song on the chart, with the exception of "You Make It Feel Like Christmas", which reached number four.

== Live performances ==
Stefani first performed "My Gift Is You" during NBC's live two-hour special, Christmas in Rockefeller Center on November 29, 2017. For the show, she wore a silver-and-black triangle-pattered dress. She also performed it during her Gwen Stefani's You Make It Feel Like Christmas television special, which premiered on NBC on December 12, 2017. The special contained various songs from her holiday album and was accompanied by holiday-themed comedy sketches and skits. For the performance, men dressed as gingerbread man cookies and several background dancers wearing holiday-themed aprons and carrying mixing bowls and wooden spoons joined Stefani on stage.

== Credits and personnel ==
Credits adapted from the liner notes of You Make It Feel Like Christmas.

- Background vocals – Erica Canales, Laura Mace, Monet Owens, Dolly Sparks
- Bass – Sean Hurley
- Cello – Alisha Bauer, Richard Dodd, Vanessa Freebairn-Smith
- Drums – Aaron Sterling
- Electric guitar – Greg Camp, John Storie
- Lead vocals – Gwen Stefani
- Lyrics – Gwen Stefani, Justin Tranter, Busbee
- Percussion, timpani – Matt Musty
- Piano – Patrick Warren
- Production – Eric Valentine, Busbee
- Viola – Matthew Funes, Leah Katz, Darrin McCann, Kathryn Reddish
- Violin – Charles Bisharat, Daphne Chen, Mario DeLeon, Eric Gorfain, Songa Lee, Natalie Leggett, Robin Olson, Joel Pargman, Michele Richards, John Wittenberg

== Charts ==
Chart performance for "My Gift Is You"
Chart (2017)	Peak position
US Holiday Digital Song Sales (Billboard)	6
