= Cheers, It's Christmas =

Studio album by Blake Shelton
- Released: October 2, 2012
- Studio: Ocean Way, Nashville
- Genre: Christmas; country
- Length: 44:34
- Label: Warner Bros. Nashville
- Producer: Scott Hendricks "Home" produced by Scott Hendricks and Brent Rowan

Blake Shelton chronology
Red River Blue (2011)	Cheers, It's Christmas (2012)	Based on a True Story... (2013)

Professional ratings
Review scores
Source	Rating
AllMusic	3/5 stars
Associated Press	(favorable)
Los Angeles Times	2.5/4 stars
Roughstock	4/5 stars
Spartanburg Herald-Journal	2.5/4 stars
Times Record News	B+

Cheers, It's Christmas is the first Christmas album and seventh studio album by American country music artist Blake Shelton. It was released on October 2, 2012, through Warner Bros. Nashville. Shelton co-wrote three tracks for the album.

== Content ==
Included on the album is a rendition of Michael Bublé's "Home", done here as a duet with the original artist and featuring Christmas-themed lyrics written by Bublé at Shelton's request. Other collaborators on the album include Shelton's former wife, Miranda Lambert; the supergroup Pistol Annies, which is composed of Lambert, Ashley Monroe, and Angaleena Presley; Shelton's mother, Dorothy Shackleford; Trypta-Phunk, a funk side project founded by Shelton's touring band; Kelly Clarkson, whose then-partner and now ex-husband, Brandon Blackstock, is Shelton's manager; Reba McEntire, who is Blackstock's stepmother; and Xenia, who placed fifth on the first season of The Voice, a televised singing competition on which Shelton is a judge.

The Hallmark Channel holiday film, "Time for Me to Come Home for Christmas," which premiered on December 15, 2018 starring Josh Henderson and Megan Park, was inspired by the track Shelton wrote with his mother.

The album was re-released in 2017 with new artwork and three additional tracks: "Savior's Shadow" (from the 2016 album If I'm Honest), "Two Step ’Round the Christmas Tree" and "Christmas Eve" (a version of Gwen Stefani's Christmas Eve).

The album re-released for a second time in 2022 with three additional tracks: "Up on the House Top", "Holly Jolly Christmas" and a cover of "Cheer for the Elves", which originally appeared on the deluxe edition of Gwen Stefani's album, "You Make It Feel Like Christmas".

== Commercial performance ==
In its first week of release, the album sold 9,000 copies in the U.S. The album sold a total of 428,000 copies in the US in 2012, and was certified Gold by the RIAA on November 9, 2012. The album re-entered the charts on November 20, 2013 at number 44 on the Billboard 200, selling 8,000 copies for the week. As of November 2017, the album has sold 688,400 copies in the US.

== Track listing ==
No.	Title	Writer(s)	Length
1.	"Jingle Bell Rock" (featuring Miranda Lambert)	Joe Beal; Jim Booth	2:03
2.	"White Christmas"	Irving Berlin	3:37
3.	"Oklahoma Christmas" (featuring Reba McEntire)	Rob Byus; Jenee Fleenor; Trent Willmon	3:28
4.	"Let It Snow! Let It Snow! Let It Snow!"	Sammy Cahn; Jule Styne	2:48
5.	"There's a New Kid in Town" (featuring Kelly Clarkson)	Don Cook; Curly Putman; Keith Whitley	4:30
6.	"Santa's Got a Choo Choo Train"	Blake Shelton; Byus; Tracy Broussard; Beau Tackett	3:35
7.	"Home" (featuring Michael Bublé)	Bublé; Alan Chang; Amy Foster-Gillies	3:46
8.	"Winter Wonderland"	Felix Bernard; Richard B. Smith	2:15
9.	"The Christmas Song"	Mel Tormé; Robert Wells	3:55
10.	"Blue Christmas" (featuring Pistol Annies)	Billy Hayes; Jay W. Johnson	2:06
11.	"I'll Be Home for Christmas"	Walter Kent; Kim Gannon; Buck Ram	3:24
12.	"Silver Bells" (featuring Xenia)	Jay Livingston; Ray Evans	3:10
13.	"Time for Me to Come Home" (featuring Dorothy Shackleford)	Shelton; Shackleford	2:40
14.	"The Very Best Time of Year" (featuring Trypta-Phunk)	Shelton; Byus; Broussard; Tackett	2:58
Total length:			44:15

2017 Deluxe Edition (Adds three songs to the original album)
No.	Title	Writer(s)	Length
15.	"Savior's Shadow"	Jon Randall; Blake Shelton; Jessi Alexander	2:44
16.	"Two Step 'Round the Christmas Tree"	Suzy Bogguss; Doug Crider	3:16
17.	"Christmas Eve"	Blake Shelton; Gwen Stefani; Justin Tranter; Michael Busbee	3:42
Total length:			53:57

== Personnel ==
- Blake Shelton – lead vocals
- Charlie Judge – keyboards, acoustic piano
- Gordon Mote – keyboards, acoustic piano
- Bryan Sutton – acoustic guitar
- David Baldwin – electric guitar
- Brent Mason – electric guitar
- Beau Tackett – electric guitar
- Paul Franklin – pedal steel guitar
- Rob Byus – bass
- Craig Nelson – bass
- Glenn Worf – bass
- Tracy Broussard – drums, percussion
- Bob Mater – drums, percussion
- Ben Phillips – drums
- Aubrey Haynie – fiddle
- Perry Coleman – backing vocals
- Carolyn Dawn Johnson – backing vocals
- Miranda Lambert – backing vocals, lead and backing vocals on "Jingle Bell Rock"
- Reba McEntire – lead and backing vocals on "Oklahoma Christmas"
- Kelly Clarkson – lead and backing vocals on "There's A New Kid in Town"
- Michael Bublé – lead and backing vocals on "Home"
- Pistol Annies – backing vocals on "Blue Christmas"
- Xenia – lead and backing vocals on "Silver Bells"
- Dorothy Shakleford – backing vocals, lead and backing vocals on "Time for Me to Come Home"
- Trypta-Phunk – lead and backing vocals on "The Very Best Time of Year"

Orchestra

- Charlie Judge – arrangements and conductor
- Stephanie O'Keefe – contractor
- Julie Gigante – concertmaster

Horns and Woodwinds

- Dan Higgins – alto saxophone
- Joel Peskin – baritone saxophone
- Brian Scanlon – tenor saxophone
- John Mitchell – bassoon
- Gene Cipriano and Phil O'Connor – clarinet
- Dan Higgins and Steve Kujala – flute
- Earle Dumler – oboe
- Charlie Morillas – bass trombone
- Nick Lane – trombone
- Chuck Findley – trumpet
- Brian O'Connor, Stephanie O'Keefe, Danielle Ondarza and Brad Warnaar – French horn

Strings

- Paul Cohen, Erika Duke-Kirkpatrick, Steve Erdody, Roger Lebow, Giovanna Moraga-Clayton and George Kim Scholes – cello
- Chuck Berghofer, Geoff Osika, Dave Stone and Mike Valerio– double bass
- Robert Brophy, Caroline Buckmam, Gina Coletti, Darrin McCaan, Eric Rynearson and Mike Whitson – viola
- Armen Anassian, Charlie Bisharat, Jackie Brand, Bruce Dukov, Nina Evtuhov, Julie Gigante, Eric Gorfain, Tamara Hatwan, Amy Hershberger, Maia Jasper, Ana Landauer, Serena McKinney, Cheryl Norman-Blake, Grace Oh, Sid Page, Joel Pargman, Radu Pieptu and Anatoly Rosinsky – violin

== Production ==
- Scott Hendricks – producer, overdub recording, digital editing
- Brent Rowan – producer (7)
- Drew Bollman – recording, mix assistant
- Justin Niebank – recording, mixing
- Nick Spezia – recording assistant
- Tommy Vicari – horn and orchestra recording
- Chandler Harrod – horn and orchestra recording assistant
- Bill Appleby – overdub recording
- Herb Shucher – overdub recording
- Chris Ashburn – overdub assistant
- Ben O'Neill – overdub assistant
- Todd Tidwell – overdub assistant
- Ben Phillips – digital editing
- Jeffrey Welch – technical assistant
- Hank Williams – mastering
- Scott Johnson – production assistant
- Katherine Petillo – art direction
- Firecracker Studios – design
- Kristin Barlowe – photography

Studios

- Recorded at Ocean Way Nashville (Nashville, Tennessee).
- Overdubs recorded at Starstruck Studios (Nashville, Tennessee); Capitol Studios and EastWest Studios (Hollywood, California); Gas Money Studios; The Villahona Resort; Cinema Sauna.
- Edited at Riverview Back Porch Studios and Superphonic Studio (Nashville, Tennessee).
- Mixed at Blackbird Studio (Nashville, Tennessee) and Hound's Ear Studio (Franklin, Tennessee).
- Technical assistance at Design FX (Los Angeles, California).
- Mastered at MasterMix (Nashville, Tennessee).

== Charts and certifications ==
=== Weekly charts ===
Chart (2012)	Peak position
Canadian Albums (Billboard)	19
US Billboard 200	8
US Top Country Albums (Billboard)	2
US Top Holiday Albums (Billboard)	1
Chart (2014)	Peak position
US Billboard 200	61

=== Year-end charts ===
Chart (2012)	Position
US Top Country Albums (Billboard)	61

Chart (2013)	Position
US Billboard 200	68
US Top Country Albums (Billboard)	19

Chart (2014)	Position
US Top Catalog Albums (Billboard)	27

Chart (2018)	Position
US Top Country Albums (Billboard)	62

Chart (2019)	Position
US Top Country Albums (Billboard)	85

=== Certifications ===
Region	Certification	Certified units/sales
Canada (Music Canada)	Gold	40,000^{^}
United States (RIAA)	Gold	688,400
^{^} Shipments figures based on certification alone.
