= You Make It Feel Like Christmas =

2017 Gwen Stefani album

Studio album by Gwen Stefani
- Released: October 6, 2017
- Recorded: 2017
- Studios: Barefoot Studios (Los Angeles, CA); The Way Station (Beverly Hills, CA)
- Genre: Christmas
- Length: 37:18
- Label: Interscope
- Producers: Busbee; Eric Valentine

Gwen Stefani chronology
This Is What the Truth Feels Like (2016)	You Make It Feel Like Christmas (2017)	Bouquet (2024)

Singles from You Make It Feel Like Christmas
- 1. "You Make It Feel Like Christmas" Released: September 22, 2017; 2. "Santa Baby" Released: December 8, 2017

You Make It Feel Like Christmas is the fourth studio album by American singer-songwriter Gwen Stefani. The album, which is Stefani's first full-length Christmas-themed album, was released on October 6, 2017, by Interscope Records. The record was executively produced by Stefani and Busbee, with additional production coming from Eric Valentine. The standard version of You Make It Feel Like Christmas contains twelve songs, featuring six original songs penned by Stefani, Busbee and Justin Tranter, and six cover versions of Christmas standards. While going on a nature walk near the Oklahoma ranch house belonging to boyfriend Blake Shelton, Stefani felt inspired to record a Christmas album and began writing what would later become "Christmas Eve". Recording sessions took place in the summer months of 2017; several of the tracks' titles leaked in August, leaving Stefani to confirm the project in September. The album's original songs make references to Stefani's newfound love and relationship with Shelton.

The album was preceded by the release of lead single "You Make It Feel Like Christmas", a duet with Shelton. It became a modest success on international record charts, becoming Stefani's first entry as a solo artist in years in several territories. A music video for the song was released in 2018. In Italy, Stefani's cover of "Santa Baby" and the original song "Secret Santa" were selected as singles and distributed to mainstream radio stations. Elsewhere, "Santa Baby" was released as a promotional single for the album. To promote You Make It Feel Like Christmas, Stefani performed on numerous television programs, such as Today, The Tonight Show Starring Jimmy Fallon, and The Ellen DeGeneres Show. She also filmed an accompanying television special, Gwen Stefani's You Make It Feel Like Christmas, which premiered on NBC on December 12, 2017. A deluxe edition of the album was distributed in October 2018 and features two previously unreleased songs and three new covers, including a duet of "Feliz Navidad" with Chilean singer Mon Laferte. Another reissue occurred in 2020 with two new songs, "Sleigh Ride" and the original single "Here This Christmas".

You Make It Feel Like Christmas garnered a mostly positive reception from music critics. Stefani was praised for creating a classical Christmas record as opposed to a modern one. However, some critics disliked the original songs for not sounding festive. Commercially, the album did not replicate the success of Stefani's three previous albums. It reached number 16 on the Billboard 200 albums chart in the United States and had first week album-equivalent units of 10,000 copies. Elsewhere, the album charted in Canada, the Czech Republic, Greece, the Netherlands, Scotland, South Korea, and the United Kingdom. All seventeen songs on the standard and deluxe editions of the record entered Billboard's Holiday Digital Song Sales component chart in the United States.

== Background ==
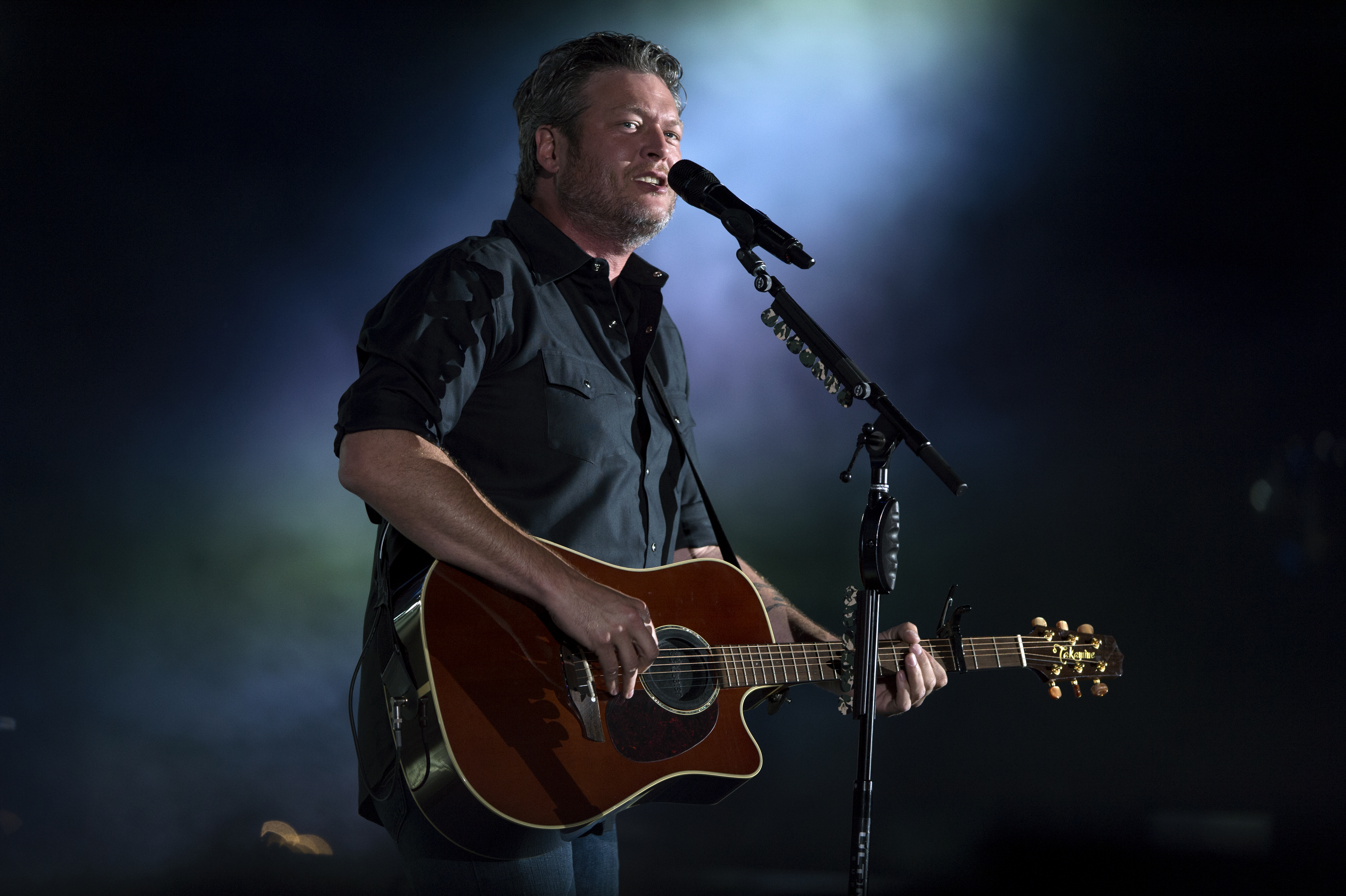
Stefani became inspired to record a Christmas album while vacationing at boyfriend Blake Shelton's ranch in Oklahoma.

Following the release of her third solo album, This Is What the Truth Feels Like, Gwen Stefani announced in July 2017 that she had plans to release new music by the end of the year. During the summer months of 2017, Stefani vacationed at Blake Shelton's Oklahoma farm estate where she spent time doing exercise, meditation, and praying. Inspired by the exotic animals surrounding her while on a spiritual walk outside Shelton's property, she remarked, "If I wrote a Christmas song, what would it be?" After questioning herself, she began singing random lyrics out loud on the spot which she would later use in "Christmas Eve", one of the album's twelve songs. She cited this nature walk as the main source of inspiration for deciding to record a Christmas album and eventually inquiring with Interscope to begin production.

The titles of several tracks, including "Christmas Eve", "Under the Christmas Lights", and "You Make It Feel Like Christmas", first leaked on August 2, 2017, when they appeared as published works on BMI and GEMA, American and German music databases, respectively. Because of the registered song titles, several music critics suggested that Stefani may be recording her first holiday album. On September 18, 2017, the singer took to her social media accounts and claimed that she "had something big planned for the holidays" and would release more information later that week. As promised, following the announcement, she revealed that she had recorded a Christmas album. She also shared the project's title – You Make It Feel Like Christmas – and its track listing. Describing the album, Stefani referred to it as a split collection of classic Christmas songs and newly recorded tracks.

== Inspiration and writing ==
I really wanted to write Christmas music, like, my whole life. To be part of the joy of Christmas and these memories that people have, and it kind of repeats and comes back, and that feeling, that nostalgic thing that music brings to Christmas, to be part of writing that was really what I wanted to do.

— Stefani's intentions when recording a holiday-themed album.

According to Stefani, her prior albums were inspired by her personal heartbreak, so You Make It Feel Like Christmas allowed for the singer to make a record that was "just so fun and easy". Following the release of This Is What the Truth Feels Like in 2016, the singer did not feel particularly inspired. She admitted to Entertainment Weekly's Madison Vain that she had no future plans to record another solo album; however, she remarked that the idea to create a Christmas album randomly "came into [her] head" and, in reaction, she immediately texted her managers and claimed "I’m going to make a Christmas record, by the way!". Studio sessions for You Make It Feel Like Christmas began occurring one week after this communication with her team and songwriting followed soon after. Shelton suggested to Stefani that she should collaborate with American musician Busbee, who was primarily known for his work with country music artists.

While determining a sound for the album, Busbee told Stefani that "it needs to be raw and punk and sort of classical at the same time" to which she agreed. To gather additional inspiration for You Make It Feel Like Christmas, Stefani listened to her favorite holiday albums from her childhood, such as Vince Guaraldi's A Charlie Brown Christmas (1965) and Emmylou Harris's Light of the Stable (1979). She also aimed for You Make It Feel Like Christmas to have a throwback vibe, taking influence from the American girl group the Ronettes and Phil Spector's Wall of Sound music formula. Other artists and musicians she listened to for inspiration included The Osmonds and Cher. Regarding her hopes for how she wanted the album to be received, Stefani said: "I love the idea of being a part of the joy of Christmas and I love the idea of having a record that will be an annual thing. I really hope we hit on something that people want to hear every year. That would be the fantasy: to be Mariah Carey."

== Music and lyrics ==
Each of the album's twelve tracks were produced by Busbee and Eric Valentine. The six original compositions on You Make It Feel Like Christmas were co-written by Stefani, Justin Tranter, and Busbee. Rachel McRady from Entertainment Tonight claimed that Stefani's holiday album contains "old classics and new romantic odes, packed with plenty of Blake Shelton references" alluding to her romantic life. Jon Pareles from The New York Times noted that the singer gives a "luxury retro treatment" to the album's twelve songs with the addition of "horns, strings, backup singers".

Stefani and Shelton performing live in 2016.

The album opens with a cover of "Jingle Bells", written and composed by James Lord Pierpont. Stefani sings "with an upbeat tone against a horn section" which Allan Raible, from ABC News, considered reminiscent of her ska punk days with No Doubt. "Let It Snow" is the second track and like "Jingle Bells", features Stefani performing with a "merry demeanor". The third song – "My Gift Is You" – is the first original song on You Make It Feel Like Christmas penned by Stefani, Tranter, and Busbee. Lyrically, it "sends a powerful Christmas message" by rejecting the idea of materialism during the holiday season. Shelton serves as a source of inspiration for the track; Stefani sings: "Don't need no money, don't need a thing, I don't even need a wedding ring / All I need is love and the truth and I got it, my gift is you". Unlike most traditional renditions of "Silent Night", Stefani's cover of the song contains a minor key change. Sal Cinquemani from Slant Magazine described "When I Was a Little Girl" as a "treacly" tune and another one inspired by Stefani's relationship with Shelton. Lyrically, Cinquemani determined it had the opposite meaning of No Doubt's 1995 single, co-written by Stefani, "Just a Girl". Her version of Wham!'s 1984 song "Last Christmas" is the sixth song, and according to Stefani, was "the most fun to record". Stefani stated: "[it] is a masterpiece as far as the music goes and how [producer Eric Valentine] created it. To me, that’s the most, of all the covers, that was really flipped. But yet, it still has the spirit of the original. Lyrically, that song speaks to me and things I’ve been through."

"You Make It Feel Like Christmas", the album's title track, features guest vocals and a songwriting credit from Shelton. Musically, it is a blend of "Stefani's pop style" and "Shelton's country roots", but leans toward the former quality. "Under the Christmas Lights" is another original penned by Stefani, Tranter, and Busbee. The lyrics are light-hearted and relatable, with Stefani singing about wrapping presents and eventually "running out of tape". The album's first promotional single and ninth track is a cover of Eartha Kitt's 1953 single "Santa Baby". On Stefani's rendition of the holiday standard "White Christmas", she stays "affectionately loyal". On "Never Kissed Anyone with Blue Eyes Before You", Stefani sings about the most romantic moments regarding her relationship with Shelton. Cinquemani described the track as "less a Christmas song than an ode to the country crooner’s recessive genes". "Christmas Eve", the closing and standard edition's twelfth track, was also the first song recorded and completed for You Make It Feel Like Christmas. Shelton recorded his own version of "Christmas Eve" which appears as a bonus track on the 2017 reissued edition of his Christmas album Cheers, It's Christmas (2012).

== Release ==
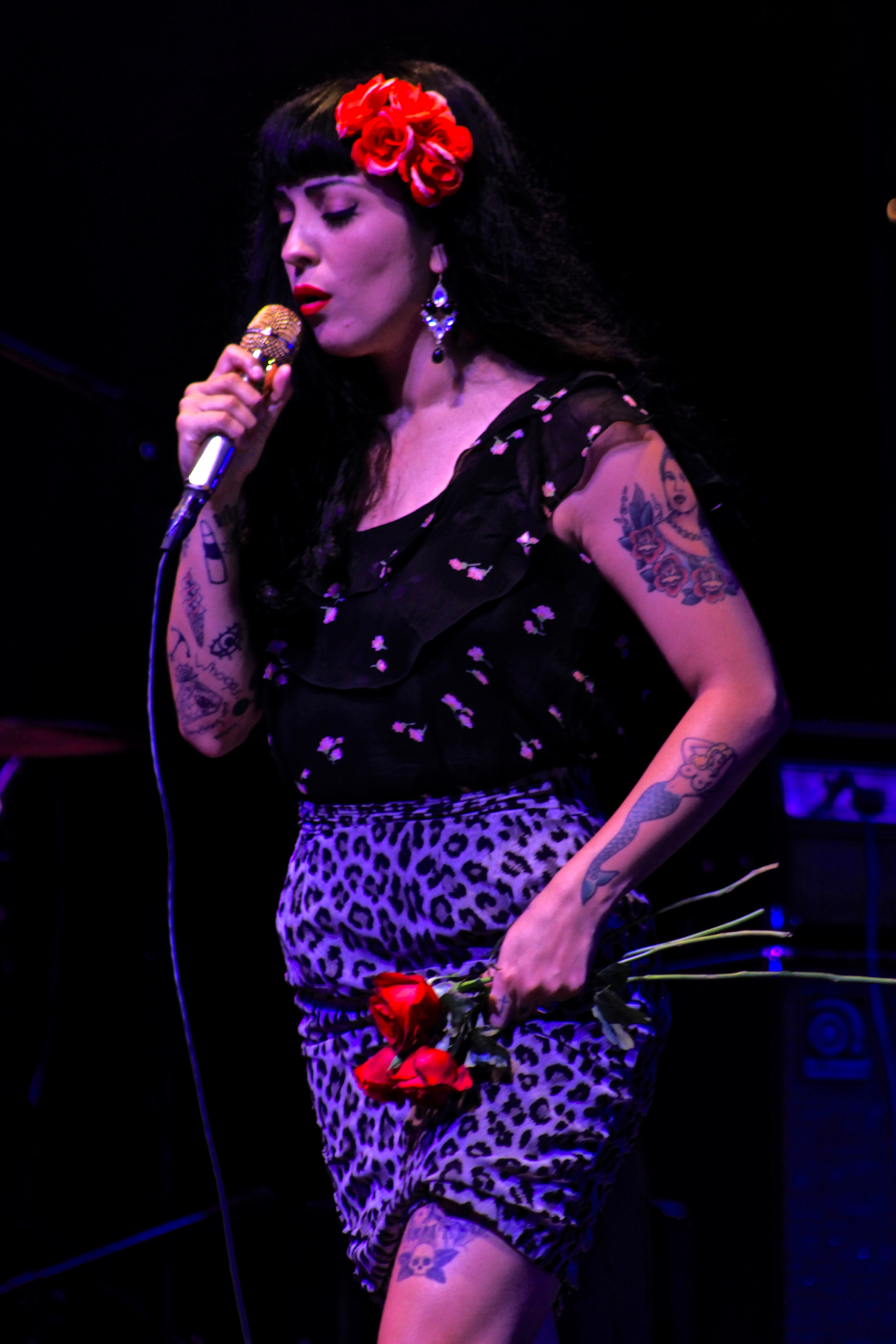
Stefani duetted with Mon Laferte on her cover of "Feliz Navidad" for the 2018 deluxe edition.

You Make It Feel Like Christmas was first released internationally on October 6, 2017, through Interscope Records. A version of the CD exclusive to Target Corporation stores was released the same day and houses the disc inside a hardcover book containing 24 pages of artwork and song lyrics pertaining to the album. On Stefani's official website, holiday-themed merchandise was added to coincide with the release of You Make It Feel Like Christmas; the line of items featured apparel, Christmas stockings, greeting cards, and mugs. On October 20 of the same year, Interscope distributed the LP version of the album on white opaque vinyl.

Via her social media platforms on September 27, 2018, Stefani confirmed that Interscope Records planned to reissue You Make It Feel Like Christmas with five bonus tracks for the upcoming holiday season, bringing the track listing to a total of seventeen songs. The new version of the album was released on October 26, 2018, and included two original songs – "Cheer for the Elves" and "Secret Santa" – both written by Stefani, Tranter, and Busbee. "Cheer for Elves" features additional background vocals from all three of Stefani's children: Kingston, Zuma, and Apollo Rossdale. The deluxe edition also contains three additional covers of Christmas standards, including "Santa Claus Is Coming to Town", "Winter Wonderland", and "Feliz Navidad". Stefani's cover of José Feliciano's "Feliz Navidad" is a duet with Chilean singer-songwriter Mon Laferte; a vertical music video of Stefani and Laferte performing the song was released exclusively on Spotify in December 2018. A limited edition deluxe version of You Make It Feel Like Christmas was distributed Target stores, containing a foldout holiday-themed poster of Stefani within the album's liner notes. The deluxe edition was also pressed on vinyl and released on November 30, 2018, via Stefani's official website.

Billboard's Lyndsey Havens suggested that You Make It Feel Like Christmas, in addition to John Legend's A Legendary Christmas (2018) and Pentatonix's Christmas Is Here! (2018), was released during the last week of October due to the largely diverse audience that Christmas music is marketed towards. John Fleckenstein, head of RCA Records, claimed that artists, including Stefani, were more likely to endure higher success with a Christmas album if a physical edition of the record was distributed to nationwide stores such as Target and Walmart by this time period in October: "Christmas albums tend to be multigenerational, and thus, they skew very heavily on the physical side. So anybody who’s going for a broad-base national play with their album will need to get a physical version into stores by the end of October."

== Promotion ==
Following the initial release of You Make It Feel Like Christmas, Stefani partnered with American culinary retailer Williams Sonoma to promote the album. Physical copies of the CD were distributed at locations nationwide and the album itself was played at stores. Stefani also recorded a Christmas-themed cooking demo with Italian-born American chef Giada De Laurentiis for Facebook Live that would later be displayed on Williams-Sonoma's official website. Stefani's cover of "Jingle Bells" was included on the official soundtrack to the 2017 film A Bad Moms Christmas. Additionally, a promotional audio still for "Christmas Eve" was uploaded to Stefani's Vevo account on October 5, 2017. After the distribution of the deluxe edition of You Make It Feel Like Christmas in November 2018, Stefani teamed up with American manufacturer Yankee Candle. The candle retailer sold copies of the new album at their stores nationwide and ran a sweepstakes that allowed fans the chance to win an autographed copy of You Make It Feel Like Christmas in addition to a limited edition scented candle.

=== Singles ===
On September 21, 2017, Stefani announced that the album's title track would be released as the lead single to coincide with the availability to pre-order You Make It Feel Like Christmas. She also shared a preview of the song via her social media accounts. The following day, "You Make It Feel Like Christmas" was distributed to digital outlets. On November 1 of the same year, a lyric video featuring images of the artwork used in the album's liner notes was uploaded to Stefani's official Vevo page. Due to digital download sales, the song peaked at number two on the Bubbling Under Hot 100 Singles chart, which serves as an extension to the Billboard Hot 100. It also entered the charts in Belgium, Scotland, the United Kingdom, and the Adult Contemporary chart in the United States where it became Stefani's second top 10 entry as a solo artist, the other being 2007's "The Sweet Escape", peaking at number 9. On November 20, 2018, the Sophie Muller-directed music video for "You Make It Feel Like Christmas" was uploaded to Stefani's Vevo account.

A cover of Eartha Kitt's "Santa Baby" was issued as the album's first promotional single on September 29, 2017. In Italy, it was released for airplay on December 8, 2017, as the album's first single. Commercially, it entered the Holiday Digital Songs chart and the Holiday Digital Song Sales chart, both peaking at number seven. "Secret Santa" was distributed to Italian radio outlets on November 30, 2018, becoming the album's third single overall and second in Italy. A cover of "Sleigh Ride" was featured as the first track on the 2020 reissued edition of the album. It was released to digital retailers for paid download and streaming on October 13, 2020. "Here This Christmas", penned by Brent Kutzle, Josh Varnadore, and Ryan Tedder, became the fourth single and was released to American radio station for contemporary hit airplay on October 23, 2020.

=== Live performances ===
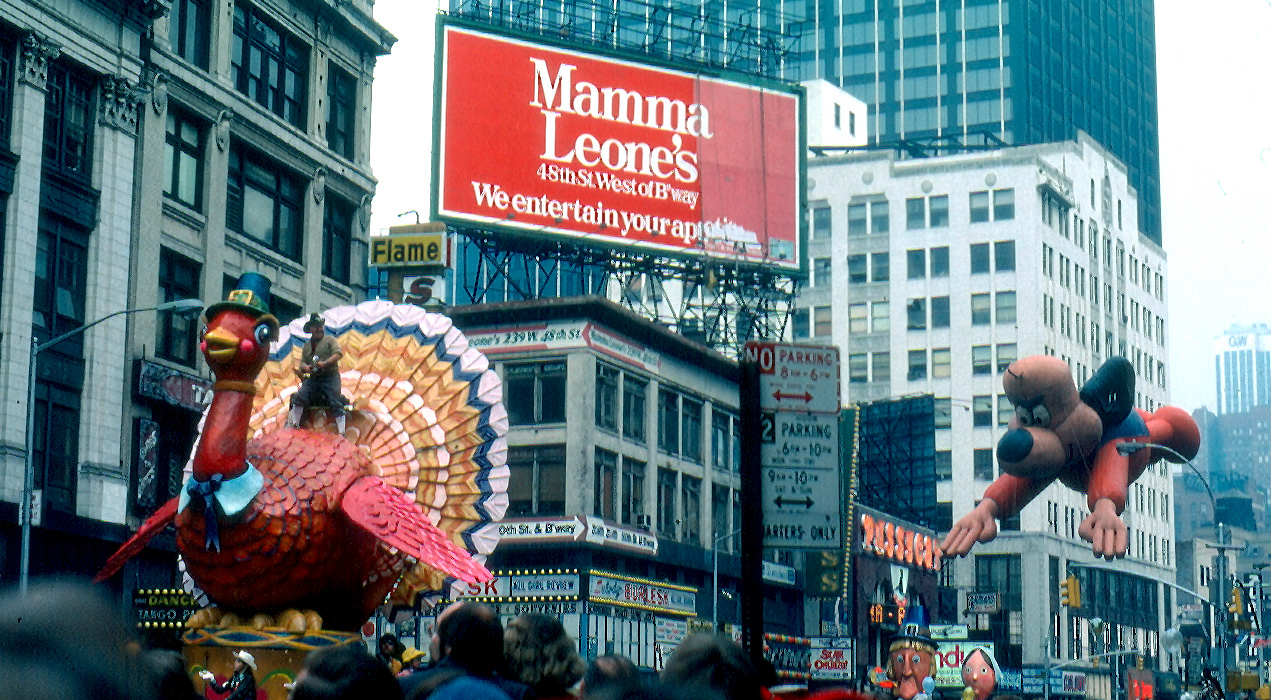
Stefani served as a featured performer at the Macy's Thanksgiving Day Parade in 2017.

To promote You Make It Feel Like Christmas, the singer embarked on a promotional tour in November and December 2017 where she performed on various television series and at several televised events. On November 20, 2017, Stefani served as a guest on Today and was interviewed about the record in between her performances. Wearing a sleeveless white gown and feather boa, she sang "When I Was a Little Girl", "Santa Baby", and "Christmas Eve" from the album. On November 21, Stefani was invited as a guest on The Tonight Show Starring Jimmy Fallon and discussed with Fallon what went into recording You Make It Feel Like Christmas. Concluding the show, the singer performed "Under the Christmas Lights" to the audience.

During the 2017 Macy's Thanksgiving Day Parade on November 23, Stefani served as a featured performer and selected to sing her cover of "White Christmas" to the crowd. At this event, she wore a "Swarovski-crystal beaded Yousef AlJasmi mini [gown] with a sparkling headpiece, matching Jimmy Choo pumps, and diamond earrings". On December 19, the singer returned to The Tonight Show Starring Jimmy Fallon to perform her cover of "Last Christmas". On December 4, Stefani and Shelton took to The Voice where they performed the title track. She wore a festive sheer and flower-inspired dress and ended the performance with a kiss from Shelton. The song was performed again on the finals of the 19th season held on December 15, 2020, with the season's eventual winner Carter Rubin. Following the distribution of the deluxe edition in 2018, Stefani appeared at Disneyland to perform "Feliz Navidad" to the live crowd. The appearance was recorded for an eventual broadcast on The Wonderful World of Disney: Magical Holiday Celebration on ABC later in the holiday season.

During Stefani's appearance on Today, she confirmed that she had filmed a holiday special for NBC, titled Gwen Stefani's You Make It Feel Like Christmas. It premiered on NBC on December 12, 2017, and was described by the network as a "modern take on traditional Christmas specials". Produced by Done and Dusted, You Make It Feel Like Christmas was filmed in Los Angeles in front of a live studio audience. NBC's premiere broadcast of the special was seen by 7.151 million viewers, according to Nielsen Media Research. It also received a 1.2 share among adults between the ages of 18 and 49, and generated NBC's second biggest overall audience in its time slot. Gwen Stefani's You Make It Feel Like Christmas became the year's most-watched holiday special on NBC, beating the previous record set by DreamWorks Trolls Holiday, which was watched by 5.2 million viewers. She performed various songs from the album as part of the set list, including "My Gift Is You", "White Christmas", and "You Make It Feel Like Christmas".

== Critical reception ==
Professional ratings
Review scores
Source	Rating
ABC News	3/5 stars
AllMusic	3/5 stars
Evening Standard	3/5 stars
Financial Times	2/5 stars
Los Angeles Times	3/4 stars
Slant Magazine	3/5 stars

You Make It Feel Like Christmas received generally favorable reviews from music critics. Time's Raisa Bruner included the release on her list of the 12 best holiday-themed albums unveiled in 2017, writing that Stefani adds her "recognizable warm vocals and bouncy production [to] the songs you know and love". Michael Bialas from The Huffington Post placed it at the top on his list of 2017's best five holiday albums. He praised the collection, labelled "When I Was a Little Girl" as the album's best original song, and wrote: "this 12-song album symbolizes the angel gracefully adorning the top of the Christmas tree this season." Providing You Make It Feel Like Christmas a three star rating, Raible from ABC News likened the "old-school light" that Stefani sheds on the record and lauded "Never Kissed Anyone with Blue Eyes Before You", "White Christmas", and "My Gift Is You" as the album's three "focus tracks". He added: "Mostly, You Make It Feel Like Christmas sounds like it was a fun record to make. Stefani sounds more animated than has in recent years. Hopefully, this burst of energy will still be present on her next proper solo album." On Randy Lewis's annual "Christmas album roundup" column for the Los Angeles Times, he gave You Make It Feel Like Christmas a three star rating out of four. He liked Stefani's collaboration with Shelton and enjoyed her "effervescent spirit" and "fresh spins" on her covers of "Jingle Bells", "Let It Snow", and "Silent Night". AllMusic's senior editor, Stephen Thomas Erlewine awarded the album three out of five stars. He enjoyed that the record featured a variety of new material, but claimed that the inclusion of "When I Was a Little Girl", "My Gift Is You", and "Never Kissed Anyone with Blue Eyes Before You" was unusual because the tracks "do [not] feel strictly seasonal"; however, Erlewine insisted that "the moments that work have a coquettish charm that is appealing, which is reason enough to warrant a listen".

David Smyth, a writer for London's Evening Standard, likened Stefani's covers of "Last Christmas", "Let It Snow", and "Santa Baby". However, he considered her original tracks to be less memorable, minus the title track which he described as "a sweet duet". Slant Magazine's Cinquemani found Stefani's holiday album to lean towards the "traditional Yuletide fare" rather than the "more contemporary sound" as heard by musicians in recent years. He also found the singer to be "affectionately loyal to the [Christmas] standards", but found that her covers of "Silent Night" and "Let It Snow" were unnecessary. Overall, he also rated the album three out of five stars. Ludovic Hunter-Tilney from Financial Times awarded You Make It Feel Like Christmas two out of five stars in his album review. He noted the absence of Stefani's signature style in the album's songs and disliked the overall "splashy big band style" which he considered to sound out-of-place with her vocals. Towards the end of his review, Hunter-Tilney highlighted "When I Was a Little Girl" as the best original composition. Variety's Chris Willman was more critical of Stefani's effort, disliking that she chose to contain "generic big band arrangements" rather than making them more stylistically diverse. In regards to the original material, he called it “more personal", described "Never Kissed Anyone with Blue Eyes Before You" as "slightly interesting", and used the title track as evidence that Shelton and Stefani should keep "their careers separate".

== Commercial performance ==
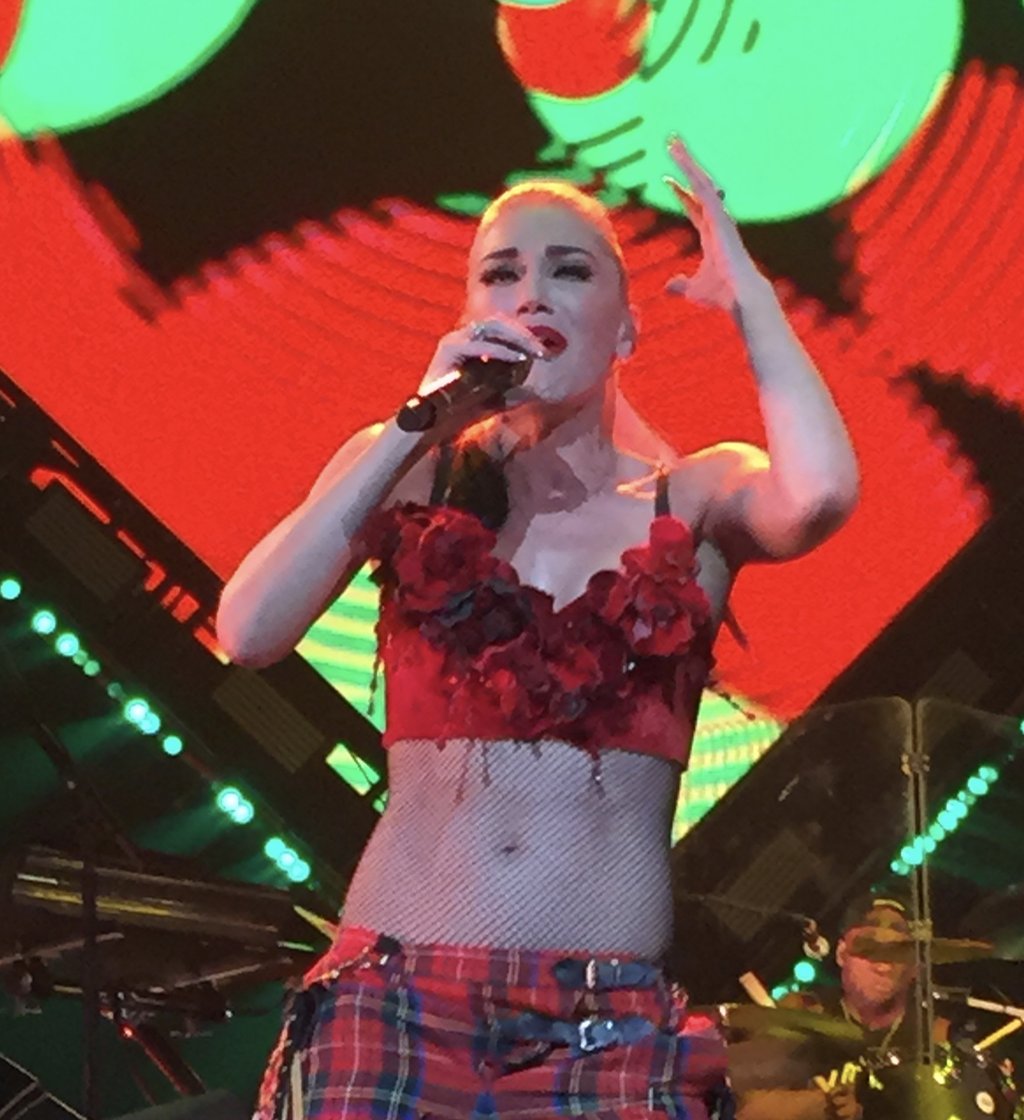
Stefani earned her first number one album on the Top Holiday Albums chart in the United States with You Make It Feel Like Christmas.

In the United States, You Make It Feel Like Christmas debuted at number 51 on the Billboard 200 and atop the Top Holiday Albums chart with 10,000 album-equivalent units for the week ending October 28, 2017. On December 30, 2017, the album peaked at number 16 on the Billboard 200, becoming the week's "biggest gainer" in terms of sales. Overall, the album spent a total of 35 weeks on the Billboard 200 chart.

In Canada, the album peaked on the Billboard Canadian Albums chart at number 24 on the week ending December 30, 2017, making it her fourth top 40 album on the Nielsen-tracked chart. Outside of North America, You Make It Feel Like Christmas had a relatively limited commercial performance. On South Korea's International Albums chart, compiled by Gaon Music Chart, Stefani's album entered at number 15 before departing the following week. You Make It Feel Like Christmas also entered the charts in select European countries. During its release week, it debuted and peaked at number 95 in the Czech Republic. In the United Kingdom and Scotland, the album peaked at numbers 55 and 59, respectively. In the Netherlands, the album peaked at number 52.

All twelve of the songs on the standard version of You Make It Feel Like Christmas reached the Holiday Digital Songs charts in the United States. In December, the singer's covers of "Jingle Bells", "Santa Baby", and "White Christmas" were peaked at numbers 5, 38, and 39 on Canada's Adult Contemporary chart in January 2018, respectively. "White Christmas" entered at number 62 on the UK Singles Chart in December 2018, becoming her first solo entry within the top 100 since 2007 with "Now That You Got It", and in Slovakia, "Under the Christmas Lights" entered the Rádio Top 100 airplay chart at number 83. In December 2021, her cover of "Jingle Bells" entered the Polish Airplay Top 100 chart at number 45.

Following the deluxe edition of You Make It Feel Like Christmas being released in October 2018, the five new tracks on the album also entered the United States' Holiday Digital Song Sales chart compiled by Billboard. The two original songs, "Secret Santa" and "Cheer for the Elves", hit the highest positions on the November 10th edition, peaking at numbers 17 and 28, respectively. Stefani's covers of "Winter Wonderland" and "Santa Claus Is Coming to Town" debuted at positions 31 and 38, respectively, while her duet of "Feliz Navidad" with Laferte reached number 34 on the chart.

== Track listing ==
All songs produced by busbee and Eric Valentine, unless otherwise noted.

You Make It Feel Like Christmas – Standard edition
No.	Title	Writer(s)	Length
1.	"Jingle Bells"	James Lord Pierpont	2:58
2.	"Let It Snow"	Sammy Cahn; Jule Styne	2:15
3.	"My Gift Is You"	Gwen Stefani; Justin Tranter; busbee	2:51
4.	"Silent Night"	Joseph Mohr; Franz Xaver Gruber	3:15
5.	"When I Was a Little Girl"	Stefani; Tranter; busbee	3:29
6.	"Last Christmas"	George Michael	4:39
7.	"You Make It Feel Like Christmas" (featuring Blake Shelton)	Stefani; Blake Shelton; Tranter; busbee	2:37
8.	"Under the Christmas Lights"	Stefani; Tranter; busbee	2:50
9.	"Santa Baby"	Joan Javits; Philip Springer; Anthony Fred Springer	2:54
10.	"White Christmas"	Irving Berlin	3:08
11.	"Never Kissed Anyone with Blue Eyes Before You"	Stefani; Tranter; busbee	3:03
12.	"Christmas Eve"	Stefani; Tranter; busbee	3:19
Total length:			37:18

You Make It Feel Like Christmas – 2018 deluxe edition
No.	Title	Writer(s)	Length
13.	"Santa Claus Is Coming to Town"	Haven Gillespie; John Fred Coots	2:58
14.	"Cheer for the Elves"	Stefani; Tranter; busbee	3:06
15.	"Secret Santa"	Stefani; Tranter; busbee	3:26
16.	"Winter Wonderland"	Richard B. Smith; Felix Bernard	2:37
17.	"Feliz Navidad" (featuring Mon Laferte)	José Feliciano	2:43
Total length:			52:08

You Make It Feel Like Christmas – 2020 digital deluxe reissue edition
No.	Title	Writer(s)	Producer(s)	Length
18.	"Sleigh Ride"	Leroy Anderson; Mitchell Parish	Brent Kutzle; Brandon Collins	2:33
19.	"Here This Christmas"	Kutzle; Josh Varnadore; Ryan Tedder	Kutzle	2:58
Total length:				57:39

You Make It Feel Like Christmas – 2025 Amazon deluxe reissue edition
No.	Title	Writer(s)	Producer(s)	Length
20.	"Shake the Snow Globe"	Stefani; Spencer Stewart; Madison Love; Sean Douglas	Stewart	2:53
21.	"Hot Cocoa"	Stefani; Stewart	Stefani; Stewart	3:38

Notes

- According to the BMI, track 11 was initially registered as "Never Kissed Anyone with Blue Eyes Before You" and appears as such on the digital standard edition of the album. The song was re-titled as "Never Kissed Anyone with Blue Eyes" on the physical standard edition, 2018 deluxe edition, and 2020 deluxe edition of the album.

== Personnel ==
Credits adapted from the liner notes of You Make It Feel Like Christmas.

=== Musicians ===
- Additional background vocals – Kingston Rossdale, Zuma Rossdale, Apollo Rossdale (track 14)
- Additional drums/percussion – Matthew Musty (tracks 1, 2, 6)
- Alto horn – Danny Levin (track 11)
- Assistant engineer – Jonathan Sterling
- Assistant lead vocals engineer – Peter Chun
- Background vocals – Laura Mace, Monet Owens, Dolly Sparks
- Background vocals – Erica Canales (tracks 2, 3, 7)
- Background vocals arranger – Grace Potter
- Bass – Sean Hurley
- Bass trombone – Ryan Dragon (tracks 1, 7, 8, 13–17)
- Celeste – Patrick Warren (tracks 6, 7)
- Cello – Alisha Bauer, Richard Dodd, Vanessa Freebairn-Smith (tracks 2–6, 9, 10, 12)
- Clarinet – Peter Slocombe (track 8)
- Contractor – Shari Sutcliffe
- Drums – Aaron Sterling (tracks 1–9, 11–12)
- Drums – Matthew Musty (tracks 10, 13–17)
- Dulcitone – Patrick Warren (tracks 9, 10)
- Editing – Eric Caudieux, Dave Clauss, Eric Valentine, Busbee
- Electric guitar – Greg Camp, John Storie (tracks 1–12)
- Engineer – Eric Valentine
- Flugelhorn – Jamie Hovorka (track 1)
- Flugelhorn – Mike Rocha, Danny Levin (tracks 1, 11)
- Flugelhorn – Stewart Cole (tracks 1, 8, 11)
- Flute – David Moyer (tracks 1, 8)
- French horn – Stewart Cole (track 11)
- Guitar – Greg Camp, John Storie (tracks 13–17)
- Glockenspiel, Tubular bells – Patrick Warren (track 6)
- Hammond B-3 – Patrick Warren (tracks 2, 11)
- Hand claps – Matthew Musty, Greg Camp, John Storie (track 8)
- Harpsichord – Patrick Warren (track 5)
- Horns arrangers – Patrick Warren, Stewart Cole, Eric Valentine, Busbee
- Keyboards – Patrick Warren (tracks 1, 12–17)
- Lap steel guitar – Eric Valentine (track 1)
- Lead vocals – Gwen Stefani
- Lead vocals – Blake Shelton (track 7)
- Lead vocals – Mon Laferte (track 17)
- Lead vocals engineers – Busbee, Dave Way
- Lyrics – James Lord Pierpont (track 1)
- Lyrics – Sammy Cahn, Jule Styne (track 2)
- Lyrics – Gwen Stefani, Justin Tranter, Busbee (tracks 3, 5, 7, 8, 11, 12, 14, 15)
- Lyrics – Joseph Mohr, Franz Xaver Gruber (track 4)
- Lyrics – George Michael (track 6)
- Lyrics – Blake Shelton (track 7)
- Lyrics – Joan Javits, Philip Springer, Anthony Fred Springer (track 9)
- Lyrics – Irving Berlin (track 10)
- Lyrics – Haven Gillespie, John Fred Coots (track 13)
- Lyrics – Richard B. Smith, Felix Bernard (track 16)
- Lyrics – José Feliciano (track 17)
- Mastering – Adam Ayan
- Mixer – Dave Clauss
- Percussion – Busbee (track 2)
- Percussion – Eric Valentine (tracks 2, 6)
- Percussion – Matthew Musty (tracks 3–5, 7–12)
- Percussion – Cian Riordan, Jonathan Sterling (track 5)
- Percussion – Blair Sinta (tracks 13–17)
- Piano – Patrick Warren (tracks 3, 6–8, 12)
- Piano – Busbee (tracks 5, 6, 11, 12)
- Piccolo – David Moyer (track 8)
- Producers – Busbee, Eric Valentine
- Production coordinator – Ivy Skoff
- Second engineers – Cian Riordan, Wesley Seidman
- Strings arranger, strings conductor – Patrick Warren
- Strings engineer – Greg Koller
- Synth strings – Patrick Warren (tracks 13–17)
- Tenor and Baritone saxophone – David Moyer (track 1)
- Tenor and Baritone saxophone – Peter Slocombe (tracks 1, 13–17)
- Tenor trombone – Ryan Dragon (tracks 13–17)
- Timpani – Matthew Musty (tracks 3, 8)
- Trombone – Busbee (tracks 7, 11)
- Trombone – Danny Levin (tracks 7, 8, 11)
- Trombone – Ryan Dragon (tracks 1, 7, 11)
- Trombone – Eric Hughes (tracks 13–17)
- Trumpet – Danny Levin (track 1)
- Trumpet – Mike Rocha (tracks 1, 7, 8, 10, 13–17)
- Trumpet – Stewart Cole, Jamie Hovorka (tracks 1, 7, 8, 10, 11)
- Trumpet – Daniel Fornero, Dave Richards (tracks 13–17)
- Vibes – Busbee (track 6)
- Vibes – Nick Mancini (track 9)
- Viola – Matthew Funes, Leah Katz, Darrin McCann, Kathryn Reddish (tracks 2, 3)
- Violin – Charles Bisharat, Daphne Chen, Mario DeLeon, Eric Gorfain, Songa Lee, Natalie Leggett, Robin Olson, Joel Pargman, Michele Richards, John Wittenberg (tracks 2, 3)
- Violin, viola – Rob Moose (tracks 13–17)

=== Technical ===
- Art direction – Jolie Clemens
- Creative direction – Gwen Stefani
- Executive producers – Gwen Stefani, Busbee
- Layout – Jolie Clemens, Emily Frye
- Photography – Jamie Nelson

== Charts ==
Chart performance for You Make It Feel Like Christmas
Chart (2017–2024)	Peak position
Canadian Albums (Billboard)	24
Czech Albums (ČNS IFPI)	95
Dutch Albums (Album Top 100)	42
German Albums (Offizielle Top 100)	16
Greek Albums (IFPI)	56
Latvian Albums (LaIPA)	82
Scottish Albums (Official Charts)	59
Slovak Albums (ČNS IFPI)	52
South Korean International Albums (Circle)	15
UK Albums (Official Charts)	55
US Billboard 200	16
US Top Holiday Albums (Billboard)	1

== Release history ==
Release dates and formats for You Make It Feel Like Christmas
Region	Date	Format(s)	Edition	Label	Ref.
Australia	October 6, 2017	Digital download; streaming	Standard	Universal Music Australia	
United States	October 6, 2017	Digital download; streaming	Standard	Interscope	
United States	October 6, 2017	CD	Standard	Interscope	
United States	October 6, 2017	CD	Target standard	Interscope	
United States	October 20, 2017	LP	Standard	Interscope	
Europe	December 1, 2017	LP	Standard	Interscope	
United States	October 26, 2018	CD; digital download; streaming	Deluxe	Interscope	
United States	October 26, 2018	CD	Target deluxe	Interscope	
United States	November 30, 2018	LP	Deluxe	Interscope	
United States	October 23, 2020	Digital download; streaming	2020 deluxe	Interscope	

== See also ==
- List of Billboard Top Holiday Albums number ones of the 2010s
