= Michelle Vicary =

American television executive

- Education: California State University, Northridge
- Occupations: EVP, Programming and Network Publicity at Crown Media Family Networks
- Awards: Cablefax Most Powerful Women (2012–2017)

Michelle Vicary is the executive vice president of programming and network publicity for Crown Media Family Networks, the parent of Hallmark Channel and Hallmark Movies & Mysteries. She oversees all production and original programming, and supervises acquisitions, scheduling, and promotional strategy for both Hallmark networks.

Vicary was honored as one of Multichannel News' Wonder Women, class of 2012, one of Cablefax's Most Powerful Women from 2012 to 2017, inducted into the Cablefax Program Hall of Fame in 2015, and featured in the Cablefax 100 list as a part of “Crown’s Dream Team” in 2016.

== Crown Media ==
Vicary joined Hallmark Channel since its inception, serving as manager of programming and promo scheduling, president of program scheduling and administration, and then senior vice president of acquisitions and scheduling. Most recently, Vicary was promoted to executive vice president of programming and network publicity.

In 2010, Vicary helped launch Hallmark Channel's first Countdown to Christmas. Over the past few years, Vicary expanded the program to include romantic comedies, dramedies, and other dramatic seasonal programming. In 2016, Vicary's team created 21 original movies across Hallmark Channel and Hallmark Movies & Mysteries.

Vicary played a part in the network's entry into original primetime scripted series, including When Calls the Heart, Good Witch, and Chesapeake Shores. Vicary also oversaw the launch of Home & Family, and expanded content with the annual Kitten Bowl and Hero Dog Awards. She oversaw the launch of Crown Media Productions in 2015, to fund original television movies and series.

Vicary developed programming strategy for Hallmark Movies & Mysteries through rapid growth in television. Under her leadership, the network launched popular franchises including Garage Sale Mysteries with Lori Loughlin, Aurora Teagarden Mysteries with Candace Cameron Bure, and Murder, She Baked with Alison Sweeney.

== Early life and career ==
Vicary attended California State University, Northridge, where she received a bachelor's degree in radio, television and film. She began her career as manager of scheduling and on-air promotion for MGM Television, and managed the monthly network schedule, series planning, and on-air promotions. Vicary transitioned to vice president of marketing for Evening Star Music Group, leading the launch of the label and marketing and distribution arms for its artists, before leaving for Hallmark.
