= You Make It Feel Like Christmas (song) =

2017 single by Gwen Stefani featuring Blake Shelton

Single by Gwen Stefani featuring Blake Shelton

from the album You Make It Feel Like Christmas
- Released: September 22, 2017
- Recorded: 2017
- Studio: Barefoot Studios (Los Angeles, CA); The Way Station (Beverly Hills, CA)
- Genre: Country pop; Christmas
- Length: 2:36
- Label: Interscope
- Songwriters: Gwen Stefani; Justin Tranter; Blake Shelton; busbee
- Producers: busbee; Eric Valentine

Gwen Stefani singles chronology
"Misery" (2016)	"You Make It Feel Like Christmas" (2017)	"Santa Baby" (2017)

Blake Shelton singles chronology
"I'll Name the Dogs" (2017)	"You Make It Feel Like Christmas" (2017)	"I Lived It" (2018)

Music video
- "You Make It Feel Like Christmas" on YouTube

"You Make It Feel Like Christmas" is a song by American singer Gwen Stefani from her fourth studio album of the same name (2017). It features guest vocals from Blake Shelton. The song was written by Stefani, Justin Tranter, Shelton and busbee, while production was handled by busbee and Eric Valentine. It was recorded during the summer months, with the song title leaking in August 2017. The song was eventually released by Interscope Records for digital download and streaming as the lead single from the album on September 22, 2017. It was influenced by popular holiday music from Stefani's childhood and marks Stefani and Shelton's second collaboration following their duet "Go Ahead and Break My Heart" in 2016. A Christmas track, the song includes country and pop music elements, with lyrics describing a romantic holiday season.

"You Make It Feel Like Christmas" received positive to mixed reviews from music critics. Some believed that the song was successful lyrically and would ultimately become a modern Christmas classic, while other critics found it inferior to the rest of You Make It Feel Like Christmas. In the United States, the song entered the Billboard Hot 100 in 2024 and peaked at number 46 in 2026. It reached the top 10 of the Adult Contemporary charts for both Canada and the US. In countries such as Germany and Switzerland, it became Stefani's first track to chart in years. On the UK Singles Chart, it served as her first solo top 100 single since 2007 and has sold 200,000 copies as of December 2022. In 2023, the single was certified Platinum by the Recording Industry Association of America (RIAA) in the US.

The accompanying music video was directed by long-time Stefani collaborator Sophie Muller and released in November 2018. It features scenes of Stefani and Shelton partaking in various holiday-themed activities interspersed with ones of the two performing the song, accompanied by a big band and children dancers. Stefani's looks in the video were described as reminiscent of American actress Marilyn Monroe. The song has been performed on various television series, such as Jimmy Kimmel Live!, The Late Late Show with James Corden and The Voice, as well as on the 2017 American holiday special Gwen Stefani's You Make It Feel Like Christmas.

== Background and release ==
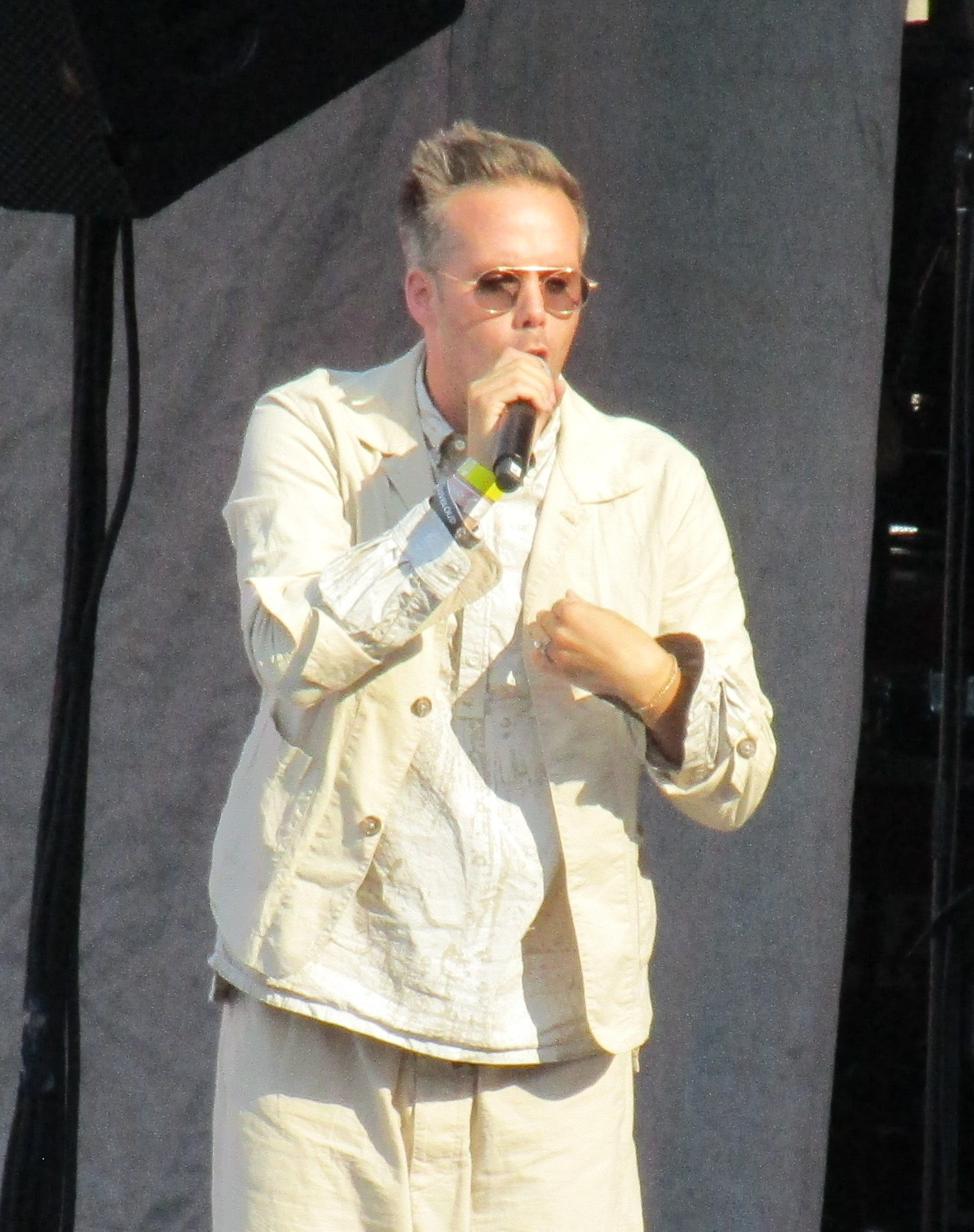
"You Make It Feel Like Christmas" is one of six original songs that was co-written by Justin Tranter (shown) and appears on Stefani's 2017 album of the same name.

After the release of Stefani's third solo album, This Is What the Truth Feels Like (2016), she announced her plans to release new music by the end of 2017 in July of that year. Besides the announcement, she had no further details. Following a nature walk that occurred at Shelton's residential estate in Oklahoma, Stefani felt inspired to write Christmas music and began work on a track that later became "Christmas Eve". The material created for You Make It Feel Like Christmas was recorded during the summer months of 2017, after Stefani scheduled joint studio and songwriting sessions with Justin Tranter and busbee. The latter of the three collaborated with Stefani following a suggestion from Shelton that she would work well with him. Stefani was pressured to create a holiday album by busbee that was "raw and punk and sort of classical at the same time"; accordingly, Stefani listened to the favorite holiday albums of her childhood, such as Vince Guaraldi's A Charlie Brown Christmas (1965) and Emmylou Harris's Light of the Stable (1979), for inspiration.

On August 2, 2017, the titles of several unreleased tracks from Stefani, including "Christmas Eve", "My Gift Is You", "Under the Christmas Lights" and "You Make It Feel Like Christmas", first leaked onto the internet when they appeared as published works on BMI and GEMA, American and German music databases, respectively. Because of the titles, music critics suggested that Stefani may have been recording a holiday album, due for release in 2017. On September 18 that year, the singer took to her social media accounts and claimed that she "had something big planned for the holidays", and would release more information in the near future. The next day, Stefani revealed that she had recorded a Christmas album, confirming its title as You Make It Feel Like Christmas, and stating that the title track would be released as the lead single. It was written by Stefani, Justin Tranter, Shelton and busbee, while production was handled by busbee and Eric Valentine.

"You Make It Feel Like Christmas" was sent to music distributors such as Amazon Music for digital download and streaming on September 22, 2017, through Interscope Records. It was ultimately serviced to adult contemporary radio stations by Interscope in several countries including the United States, except in Italy where the Universal Music Group released Stefani's cover of "Santa Baby" as the lead single instead. Alongside the release included two unique promotional CD singles; one was distributed to United Kingdom radio stations by Interscope Records while another, serviced through Polydor Records and Universal Music Group, was sent out for French airplay rotation. In Russia, the song was released to contemporary hit radio stations on September 25, 2017.

== Composition and lyrics ==
"You Make It Feel Like Christmas" is Stefani and Shelton's second duet, following "Go Ahead and Break My Heart" in 2016.

Musically, "You Make It Feel Like Christmas" is an infectious and upbeat country pop Christmas song with romantic lyrics. Megan Armstrong from Billboard described the song as a blend of both Stefani and Shelton's signature styles, incorporating elements from both the pop and country genres, although she felt it emphasized the former more than the latter. Labelling it a "bouncy duet", AllMusic's Stephen Thomas Erlewine noted that the song contains a "Motown beat" and pays homage to the past. Echoing the view that the song has an older vibe, Noisey's Alex Robert Ross called the duet "an upbeat, old-timey, country-esque Yuletide song". Furthermore, Michael Bialas from The Huffington Post used "You Make It Feel Like Christmas" to characterize Stefani's career as heading into a country music direction.

According to Musicnotes.com, "You Make It Feel Like Christmas" is set in common time and has a moderate "bright swing" tempo of 93 beats per minute. The key of the song is in C major, with Stefani's vocal range spanning nearly an entire octave, from C_{3} to E_{5} in scientific pitch notation. Throughout the song's three verses, the vocal range advances in the chord progressions of C–G–B–Am. The song was engineered by Valentine and mixed by Dave Clauss. Jonathan Sterling served as assistant engineer whereas busbee and Dave Way were lead vocals engineers, with assistance from Peter Chun. Erica Canales, Laura Mace, Monet Owens, and Dolly Sparks provided background vocals for the track, with arrangements from Grace Potter.

The first verse is performed by Shelton, who sings, "I wanna thank the storm that brought the snow / Thanks to the string of lights that make it glow". According to E! News's Cydney Contreras, Stefani "joyously sings about how she thought she 'was done for [and] thought that love had died'"; however, she disregards her assumptions after being romantically involved with Shelton, who helps make it "feel like Christmas". The couple discuss love and name-drop holiday-themed items, such as snow and "sweet gingerbread made with molasses", within the lyrics.

== Critical reception ==
Allan Raible from ABC News admired the song's retro charm, calling it an asset. Regarding Shelton's feature, he wrote: "This is Shelton being welcomed into Stefani’s world and not sounding out of place." Randy Lewis of the Los Angeles Times enjoyed the collaboration, writing that it is "sweetly romantic" and an obvious inclusion on You Make It Feel Like Christmas due to the highly publicized relationship. Rob Copsey, an editor for the Official Charts Company, appreciated Stefani's decision to emphasize the importance of family in the song. He described the song as a modern classic and said: "There's just the right amount of schmaltz and country-pop festive cheer, so expect to see this reappear in the coming years." Mike Nied from Idolator was similarly positive, suggesting that it "may have something that will live up to Mariah Carey’s defining classic 'All I Want For Christmas Is You'" from 1994.

Ross was critical of the single's release date in September, several months before Christmas Day. As one of the subjects for his 2017 article titled "Christmas Songs? In September? Really?", the song was described as "almost quite fun if you live somewhere unnaturally cold during the fall". Variety's Chris Willman considered the original songs on You Make It Feel Like Christmas to be superior to her covers; however, he used "You Make It Feel Like Christmas" as evidence that Shelton and Stefani should keep "their careers separate". Quite oppositely, while David Smyth from Evening Standard was positive about the album in general, he considered the song to be less memorable than Stefani's covers of Christmas standards.

== Commercial performance ==
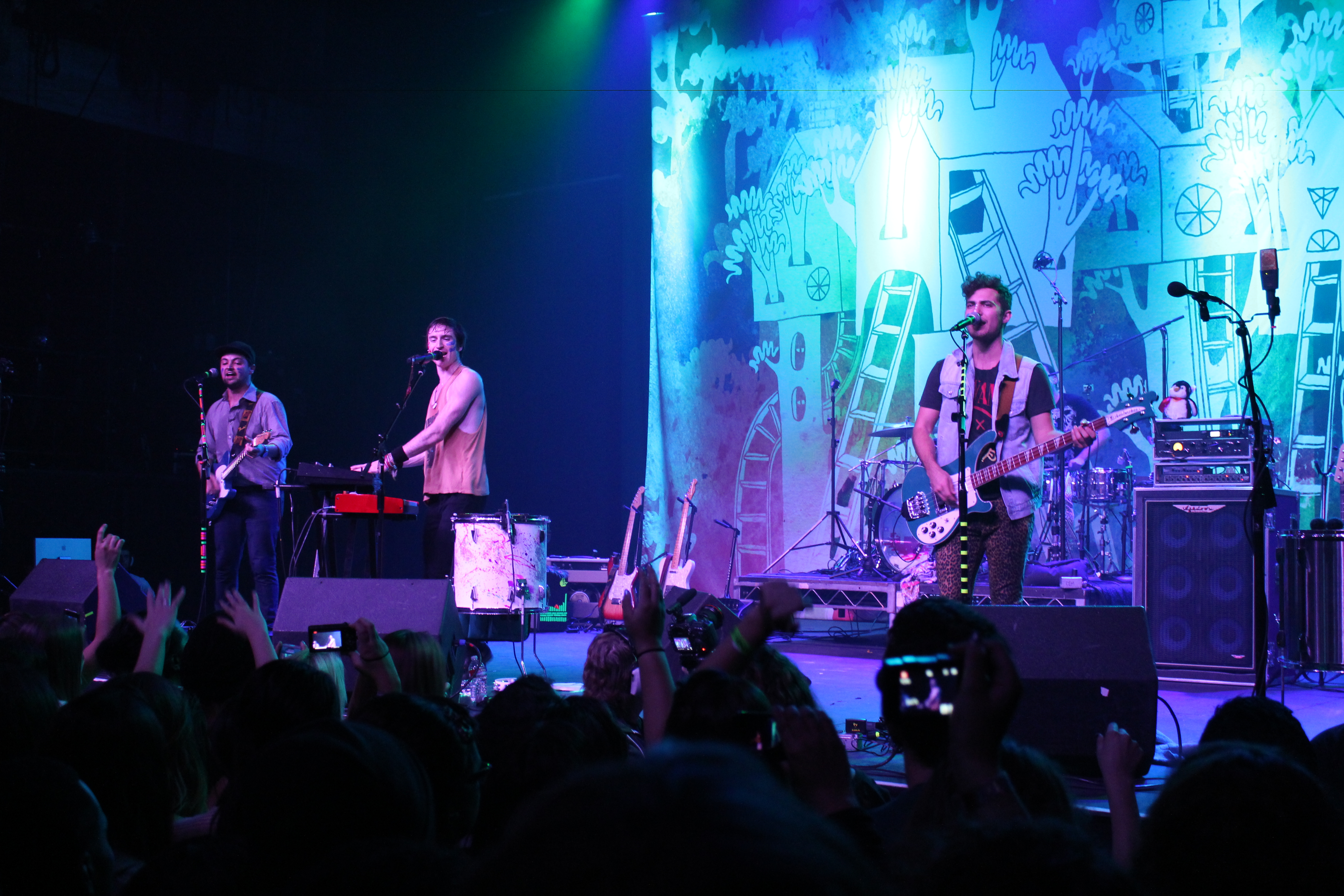
Walk the Moon prevented "You Make It Feel Like Christmas" from holding the US Bubbling Under Hot 100's top spot with their 2017 single "One Foot".

In the US, "You Make It Feel Like Christmas" narrowly missed entering the Billboard Hot 100 chart the year of its release. Instead, it reached the US Bubbling Under Hot 100 chart, which serves as an extension to the Hot 100, cataloging the songs that have not yet charted on the main ranking. The song entered at number 11 for the issue date of December 23, 2017. The following week it peaked at number two and was blocked from the top spot by Walk the Moon's 2017 single "One Foot". The song lasted for four weeks on the Bubbling Under Hot 100. Fueled by strong download sales, "You Make It Feel Like Christmas" peaked at number 37 in 2017 on the US Digital Song Sales chart and number 3 on the corresponding Holiday Digital Song Sales component chart. Of Stefani's five top 10 hits on the latter chart, "You Make It Feel Like Christmas" reached the highest peak. The song re-entered the Digital Song Sales chart in 2020, when it reached a new peak at number 35. Following the single's release to adult contemporary radio playlists in 2017, the single reached number nine on Billboard's Adult Contemporary chart, becoming the singer's second top 10 track as a solo artist and highest entry since "The Sweet Escape" peaked at number three in 2007. The former also entered the seasonal US Holiday 100 airplay chart, peaking at number 37. It eventually entered the Billboard Hot 100 chart, peaking at number 46 on the chart dated January 3, 2026. On December 10, 2020, the single was awarded a Gold certification from the Recording Industry Association of America, signifying 500,000 track-equivalent units, which was upgraded to Platinum in 2023.

On Canadian charts, "You Make It Feel Like Christmas" reached number 26 on the country's main digital sales chart in 2017. It spent five non-consecutive weeks on the chart, with its last appearance on the chart occurring in 2020, when it peaked at number 24. It also reached airplay charts for Canada: the Adult Contemporary and Hot Adult Contemporary charts, where the song peaked at numbers 2 and 31, respectively. On the former chart, "You Make It Feel Like Christmas" became Stefani's most successful solo entry, surpassing "The Sweet Escape" that had previously reached number three. The following year, during the 2018 holiday season, "You Make It Feel Like Christmas" also entered the recurrent Adult Contemporary chart in Canada due to heavy airplay.

Outside of North America, "You Make It Feel Like Christmas" reached the charts in many European countries. In Switzerland, the song became Stefani's first chart entry as a solo artist since 2007's "Early Winter". It entered at number 80 in 2017 and ultimately peaked at number 40 in 2024; the song spent 11 weeks in total on the Swiss Hitparade chart. Similar performance was attained in Germany, where "You Make It Feel Like Christmas" reached number 55, becoming the singer's first entry since her comeback single "Baby Don't Lie" in 2014. In the UK, the single debuted at number 100 on the UK Singles Chart for the chart dated December 22, 2017, serving as Stefani's first solo top 100 hit since "Now That You Got It" with Damian Marley in 2007. In 2017, the former reached number 98, but during the holiday season in 2018, it re-entered the chart and peaked at number 71 for the week ending December 28, 2018. By December 7 of that year, the song had sold 33,500 copies in the UK. In 2019, the sales total for "You Make It Feel Like Christmas" increased to 66,000 copies, and it was certified Gold by the British Phonographic Industry (BPI) in December 2025 for sales and streams exceeding 400,000 units. By 2024, the song reached a new peak at 69. On the Scottish Singles Chart, compiled by Official Charts Company, the single peaked at number 57. Elsewhere in Europe, "You Make It Feel Like Christmas" peaked on the airplay charts in Belgium, Poland, and Slovakia at numbers 31, 43 and 33, respectively.

== Music video ==
The music video for "You Make It Feel Like Christmas" was shot over the course of one day during late 2018. It was directed by long-time Stefani collaborator Sophie Muller, who had previously directed the music videos for "Don't Speak" (1996), "Cool" (2005) and "Spark the Fire" (2014), among others. The primary source of inspiration for the clip was the 1957 musical film Pal Joey, which Stefani and Shelton had watched together during a date night. After production was completed and prior to the clip's release, Shelton tweeted that the style of the latter reminded him of the 1950s American sitcom I Love Lucy. Stefani was grateful for the shoot and considered the final product Shelton's Christmas gift to her, citing his dislike of filming music videos. Stefani first hinted of the video's release on November 18, 2018, uploading a series of stills from the final video to her various social media accounts, such as Instagram. In particular, one of the photos depicted Stefani preparing a holiday feast alongside Shelton and included the song's lyric "We're gonna be a classic for all time..." as the caption. She later confirmed that the music video would be released on November 22, 2018, and was directed by Muller. On the scheduled date, it was uploaded to her official Vevo account on YouTube.

Stefani flirting with Shelton in the "You Make It Feel Like Christmas" video; several music critics noted that her appearance in the video was reminiscent of Marilyn Monroe.

The video opens with Stefani and Shelton driving in a retro convertible as snow falls. While transporting a Christmas tree in the car, Shelton becomes disrupted by a swarm of bees that Stefani attempts to shoo away. Another scene depicts the couple in an orchestral hall setting, with a big backing band and a group of children dancers dressed as Santa Claus, and the people cause Shelton to become surprised. He wears a tuxedo and Stefani sports a silver flashy and "ritzy" dress, with her look in the segment being compared to American actress Marilyn Monroe. The succeeding scene shows the couple building snowmen in a forest, with Shelton's resembling the traditional variety and Stefani's replicating the appearance of Michelangelo's David.

They are again joined by the backing band and dancing children, who perform their choreography and circle Stefani and Shelton as the couple sing. A living room setting features Stefani magically decorating the interior and entrapping Shelton with a string of Christmas lights. As Stefani cuddles with and embraces Shelton, he uses a handheld nutcracker to open a shelled chestnut without luck. Another scene demonstrates Stefani adding the finishing touches to a holiday feast and reprimanding Shelton for attempting to eat prematurely. Following the video fading to black, bonus scenes show Stefani and Shelton engaging in a food fight, the latter losing control of the vehicle during a snowstorm, and Stefani attempting to woo Santa, much to the dismay of Shelton.

Alongside the release of the music video, the paid download was available for purchase via iTunes on November 22, 2018. A behind-the-scenes clip documenting the filming and production of the video was published to Stefani's main YouTube channel on December 7, 2018. Idolator's Mike Wass was impressed by the visual, writing: "Calling Gwen & Blake's video adorable is a serious understatement [...] It’s as irreverent, cheeky and feel-good as the song." Multiple critics considered Stefani to be channeling Monroe in the clip. Wass wrote: "This nostalgic clip throws it back to the 1950s with [Stefani] serving full Marilyn Monroe glamour" while UPI's Annie Martin claimed that in the big band scene, Stefani wears a "retro-inspired look [...] reminiscent of Marilyn Monroe".

== Live performances ==
On December 4, 2017, Stefani and Shelton appeared on The Voice, where they performed "You Make It Feel Like Christmas". The former wore a festive sheer and flower-inspired dress, and ended the performance with a kiss from Shelton. Randee Dawn from Today spoke positively of the act, calling it festive and "a major high point for the pair". On Stefani's holiday special for NBC, titled Gwen Stefani's You Make It Feel Like Christmas, she performed various songs from the album as part of her set list, including "You Make It Feel Like Christmas". Stefani was joined by Shelton when performing the track and she wore a matching plaid top and slit skirt. Entertainment Tonight's Emily Krauser opined that Stefani's "real ska sensibilities came out" during the performance.

During the 2018 holiday season, Stefani served as a guest on Jimmy Kimmel Live! and performed both "You Make It Feel Like Christmas", and a duet cover of "Feliz Navidad" with Chilean singer Mon Laferte. For the former's appearance, she wore a "white gown [with] embellished polka dots on sheer material" and was accompanied by a group of four backup dancers, dressed in black-and-white clothing. The performance was eventually uploaded to her Vevo account on December 8, 2018. She also appeared on the December 19, 2018 episode of The Late Late Show with James Corden to perform the track. The performance was praised by AXS contributor Kareem Gantt, who wrote that "Stefani brought the house down, and it gave the 'Corden' set a festive, yule-time feel that is sorely needed right now". For the Christmas Eve broadcast of ESPN's Monday Night Football, Stefani performed a condensed version of the song during the Genesis-sponsored halftime show. It was broadcast in black and white and uploaded to Stefani's YouTube account that same day.

At the 87th annual Rockefeller Center tree lighting ceremony in 2019, Stefani served as a featured performer alongside fellow The Voice judge and American singer John Legend. Her performance occurred on November 14, 2019, and Stefani began with "You Make It Feel Like Christmas" and closed with her cover of the Christmas standard "White Christmas". According to Heran Mamo of Billboard, she wore "a sheer black long-sleeve with a pearl-embellished red and gold shimmering front, black sequined hot pants, black fishnet leggings and black leather knee-high boots". Her segment was recorded and later broadcast via NBC on December 4, 2019. Radio station WRMF reported that the performance was likely prerecorded due to her prior commitment to be available for The Voice.

== Cover versions and usage in media ==
For a seasonal promotional campaign of the American motor company Ram Trucks in December 2018, the single was used in television commercials to advertise the new Ram 1500 pickup truck. Additionally, American record label Power Music remade "You Make It Feel Like Christmas" as a dance remix called the "Workout Remix", and released it to their Apple Music profile on November 6, 2020. On December 16, 2020, The Voice winner Carter Rubin performed "You Make It Feel Like Christmas" with Stefani during the season 19 finale. Their version appears on his first extended play, The Season 19 Collection, a compilation of select performances from the series. It was released for digital download and streaming in the US and Canada, through Republic Records.

== Track listing ==
Digital download/promotional CD single/streaming
No.	Title	Length
1.	"You Make It Feel Like Christmas" (featuring Blake Shelton)	2:36

Digital download/streaming – The Voice performance
No.	Title	Length
1.	"You Make It Feel Like Christmas" (The Voice performance) (with Carter Rubin)	2:34

== Credits and personnel ==
=== Song ===
Credits adapted from the liner notes of You Make It Feel Like Christmas.

- Gwen Stefani – lead vocals, writer
- Blake Shelton – featured vocals, writer
- Justin Tranter – writer
- busbee – writer, production, trombone
- Eric Valentine – production
- Sean Hurley – bass
- Ryan Dragon – bass trombone, trombone
- Erica Canales – background vocals
- Laura Mace – background vocals
- Monet Owens – background vocals
- Dolly Sparks – background vocals
- Patrick Warren – celeste, piano
- Aaron Sterling – drums
- Greg Camp – electric guitar
- John Storie – electric guitar
- Matt Musty – percussion, timpani
- Stewart Cole – trumpet
- Jamie Hovorka – trumpet

=== Music video ===
Credits adapted from Stefani's YouTube account.

- Sophie Muller – director
- Grant Jue – producer

== Charts ==
=== Weekly charts ===
Weekly chart performance for "You Make It Feel Like Christmas"
Chart (2017–2026)	Peak position
Australia (ARIA)	38
Austria (Ö3 Austria Top 40)	29
Belgium (Ultratip Bubbling Under Flanders)	10
Belgium (Ultratop Airplay Flanders)	31
Belgium (Ultratop Back Catalogue Singles Wallonia)	19
Canada Hot 100 (Billboard)	40
Canada AC (Billboard)	2
Canada Hot AC (Billboard)	31
CIS Airplay (TopHit)	84
Croatia International Airplay (Top lista)	13
Croatia Christmas International Airplay (Top lista)	14
Czech Republic Singles Digital (ČNS IFPI)	78
Estonia Airplay (TopHit)	34
Finland Airplay (Radiosoittolista)	71
Germany (GfK)	30
Global 200 (Billboard)	40
Ireland (IRMA)	57
Lithuania (AGATA)	51
Moldova Airplay (TopHit)	28
Netherlands (Single Top 100)	57
New Zealand Heatseekers (RMNZ)	8
Poland Airplay (ZPAV)	43
Portugal (AFP)	155
Scottish Singles Sales (Official Charts)	57
Slovakia Airplay (ČNS IFPI)	33
Switzerland (Schweizer Hitparade)	39
UK Singles (Official Charts)	69
US Billboard Hot 100	46
US Adult Contemporary (Billboard)	9
US Holiday 100 (Billboard)	34

=== Monthly charts ===
Monthly chart performance for "You Make It Feel Like Christmas"
Chart (2025)	Peak position
Moldova Airplay (TopHit)	46

== Certifications ==
Certifications for "You Make It Feel Like Christmas"
Region	Certification	Certified units/sales
Germany (BVMI)	Gold	300,000^{‡}
New Zealand (RMNZ)	Gold	15,000^{‡}
United Kingdom (BPI)	Gold	400,000^{‡}
United States (RIAA)	Platinum	1,000,000^{‡}
^{‡} Sales+streaming figures based on certification alone.

== Release history ==
Release dates and formats for "You Make It Feel Like Christmas"
Region	Date	Format(s)	Version	Label	Ref.
Various	September 22, 2017	Digital download; streaming	Original	Interscope	
United Kingdom	September 22, 2017	Promotional CD single	Original	Interscope	
France	September 22, 2017	Promotional CD single	Original	Universal Music Group	
Russia	September 27, 2017	Contemporary hit radio	Original	Universal Music Group	
United States	December 16, 2020	Digital download; streaming	The Voice performance	Republic	
Canada	December 16, 2020	Digital download; streaming	The Voice performance	Republic	

== See also ==
- List of best-selling Christmas singles in the United States
