= Gwen Stefani's You Make It Feel Like Christmas =

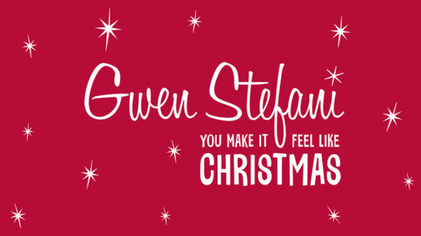
- Title card
- Starring: Gwen Stefani
- Country of origin: United States
- Original language: English

Production
- Running time: 60 minutes

Original release
- Network: NBC
- Release: December 12, 2017

Gwen Stefani's You Make It Feel Like Christmas is a Christmas television special that aired on December 12, 2017, in the United States on NBC.

== Production ==
On October 6, 2017, Stefani released her fourth studio album, You Make It Feel Like Christmas, a collection of classic Christmas songs and newly recorded tracks, through her record label Interscope. Following her appearance on Today on November 20, Stefani discussed her upcoming television special titled Gwen Stefani's You Make It Feel Like Christmas.

== See also ==
- List of United States Christmas television specials
