= Gwen Stefani discography =

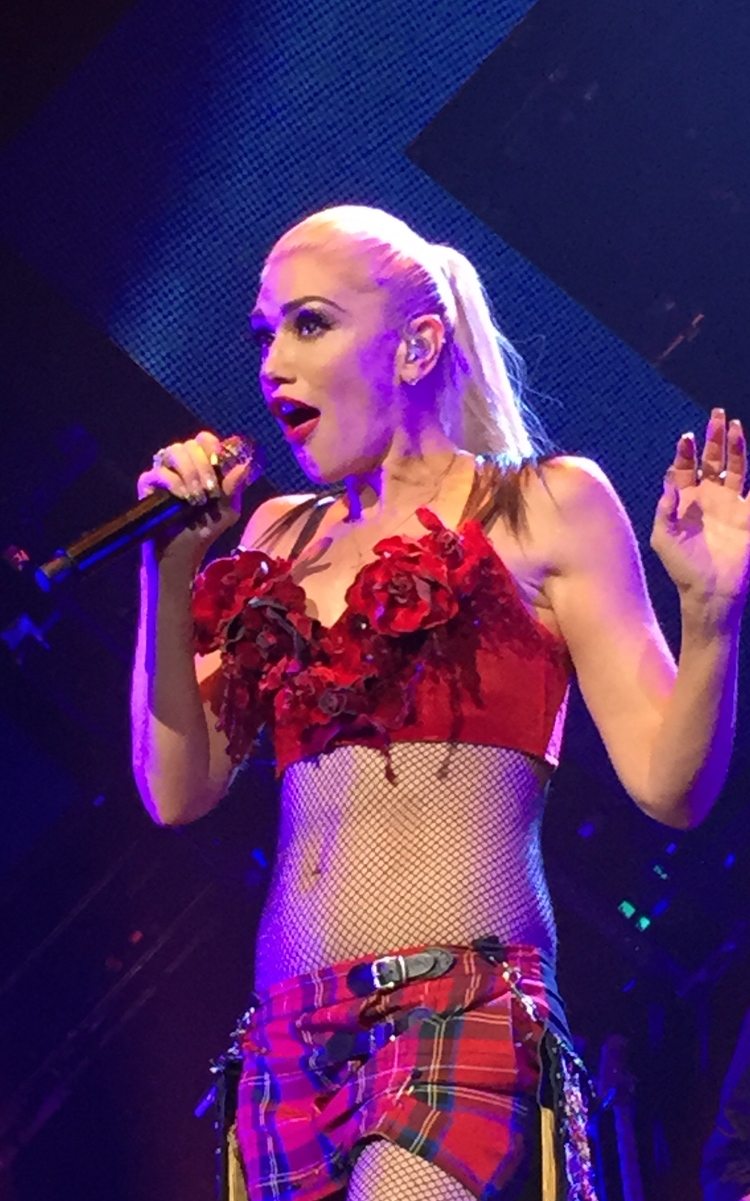
- Stefani performing "Obsessed", a bonus track on her third studio album, during the This Is What the Truth Feels Like Tour (2016)
- Studio albums: 5
- Extended plays: 2
- Singles: 39
- Promotional singles: 7
- Video albums: 1
- Music videos: 28

American singer Gwen Stefani has released five studio albums, two extended plays, 39 singles (including nine as a featured artist), seven promotional singles, one video album, and 28 music videos. Stefani is also the lead singer of the rock band No Doubt, with which she has released several albums.

Stefani began to record solo material in early 2003, and her debut solo album Love. Angel. Music. Baby. was released in November 2004. It debuted on the US Billboard 200 at number seven, and reached multi-platinum status in the United States, the United Kingdom, Australia, and Canada. The first single released from the album was "What You Waiting For?", which charted in the top 10 in most of the countries in which it was released. "Rich Girl" was released as the album's second single, a collaboration with rapper Eve; it was successful on several formats, and reached the top 10 in the UK and the US. The third single "Hollaback Girl" became Stefani's first US and second Australian number-one single; it was less successful elsewhere. The fourth single "Cool" was released shortly after but it did not perform as well as its predecessor, failing to reach the top 10 in the US and UK. "Luxurious" was released as the album's fifth single, but did not perform as well as its predecessors. "Crash" was released in early 2006 as the album's sixth single in lieu of Love. Angel. Music. Baby.'s sequel, which was delayed by Stefani's pregnancy. It charted only in the US.

Stefani released her second album The Sweet Escape in December 2006; it spawned five singles from October 2006 to October 2007. The album's music contains new wave and dance music influences similar to that of its predecessor, while also exploring more modern pop sounds. The first single released from the album was "Wind It Up", which peaked in the top 20 in most of the countries in which it was released. The second single, "The Sweet Escape", featuring singer Akon, peaked in the top 10 of most charts, reaching number two in the US and UK. "4 in the Morning" was released as the album's third single; managing a top 30 placement on the US Pop chart but failing to reach the top 40 of the Billboard Hot 100. Although, the single went-on to become a top ten success in Australia and New Zealand. "Now That You Got It", a hybrid song featuring reggae artist Damian Marley, also had a less than stellar chart performance; it did not make the top 20 anywhere except Norway and failed to chart in the US. The album's fifth and final single, "Early Winter", was released across only mainland Europe and charted moderately well. On the same day as Stefani released The Sweet Escape, she also released Harajuku Lovers Live on DVD, a recording of a concert performed in November 2005 in Anaheim, California as part of her Harajuku Lovers Tour.

In late 2014, Stefani released two non-album singles, "Baby Don't Lie" on October 20, 2014, and "Spark the Fire" on December 1, 2014. "Baby Don't Lie" received moderate success on commercial charts, while "Spark the Fire" only charted on the Dance Club Songs chart. Stefani was a featured singer on Eminem's single, "Kings Never Die", which was written specifically for the 2015 film Southpaw. On October 20, 2015, Stefani released the lead single for her third studio album, This Is What the Truth Feels Like, "Used to Love You". "Make Me Like You" and "Misery" were also released from the album. Stefani's fourth album and first Christmas album is You Make It Feel Like Christmas and was preceded by the release of the title track, a duet with Blake Shelton in 2017. All of the album's seventeen songs entered the Holiday Digital Songs chart in the United States. Stefani and Shelton have released three other collaborations, including "Go Ahead and Break My Heart" (2016) and "Nobody but You" (2019), which peaked at numbers 70 and 18 in the United States, respectively. In July 2020, they released "Happy Anywhere". She released her first solo single in two years, "Let Me Reintroduce Myself", in December of the same year and then followed this with "Slow Clap", which was remixed to feature Saweetie the following month.

In 2024, Stefani announced that her fifth studio album, Bouquet would be released on November 15.

== Studio albums ==
List of studio albums, with selected chart positions, certifications, and sales figures
Title	Album details	Peak chart positions										Sales	Certifications
Title	Album details	US	AUS	CAN	FRA	GER	NOR	NZ	SCO	SWI	UK	Sales	Certifications
Love. Angel. Music. Baby.	Released: November 12, 2004; Label: Interscope; Formats: Cassette, CD, digital download, LP, streaming	5	1	3	19	11	6	5	5	17	4	World: 8,000,000; US: 4,000,000; UK: 1,068,242	RIAA: 5× Platinum; ARIA: 5× Platinum; BPI: 3× Platinum; BVMI: Gold; IFPI NOR: Platinum; IFPI SWI: Gold; MC: 5× Platinum; RMNZ: 4× Platinum; SNEP: Gold
The Sweet Escape	Released: December 1, 2006; Label: Interscope; Formats: Cassette, CD, digital download, LP, streaming	3	2	3	33	17	5	4	24	8	14	US: 1,733,000; UK: 365,143	RIAA: 2× Platinum; ARIA: 2× Platinum; BPI: Platinum; BVMI: Gold; IFPI NOR: Gold; IFPI SWI: Platinum; MC: 2× Platinum; RMNZ: 2× Platinum
This Is What the Truth Feels Like	Released: March 18, 2016; Label: Interscope; Formats: CD, digital download, LP, streaming	1	6	3	44	40	40	15	13	10	14	US: 76,000; CAN: 4,400	
You Make It Feel Like Christmas	Released: October 6, 2017; Label: Interscope; Formats: CD, digital download, LP, streaming	16	—	24	—	16	—	—	59	—	55	US: 9,000	
Bouquet	Released: November 15, 2024; Label: Interscope; Formats: CD, digital download, LP, streaming	95	—	—	— (Note: Bouquet did not enter the French Albums Chart, but peaked at number 86 on the French Physical Albums chart.)	—	—	—	94	80	— (Note: Bouquet did not enter the UK Albums Chart, but peaked at number 44 on the UK Album Sales chart.)	US: 11,200	
"—" denotes a title that did not chart, or was not released in that territory.

== Extended plays ==
Title	EP details	Notes
Love. Angel. Music. Baby. (The Remixes)	Released: November 22, 2005; Label: Interscope; Format: Digital download, streaming	Remix EP consisting of four versions of Love. Angel. Music. Baby. songs
Just a Girl	Released: August 25, 2021; Label: Universal Music Group; Format: Streaming	Spotify-exclusive compilation consisting of six songs from Love. Angel. Music. Baby. and The Sweet Escape

== Singles ==
=== As lead artist ===
List of singles as lead artist, with selected chart positions and certifications, showing year released and album name
Title	Year	Peak chart positions										Certifications	Album
Title	Year	US	AUS	AUT	CAN	FRA	GER	NLD	NZ	SWI	UK	Certifications	Album
"What You Waiting For?"	2004	47	1	7	24	5	22	7	3	17	4	RIAA: Platinum; ARIA: 2× Platinum; BPI: Platinum; RMNZ: Platinum	Love. Angel. Music. Baby.
"Rich Girl" (featuring Eve)	2004	7	2	10	12	4	14	3	3	6	4	RIAA: 2× Platinum; ARIA: Platinum; BPI: Gold; RMNZ: Platinum	Love. Angel. Music. Baby.
"Hollaback Girl"	2005	1	1	5	12	17	3	8	3	6	8	RIAA: 6× Platinum; ARIA: Platinum; BPI: Platinum; BVMI: Gold; RMNZ: 3× Platinum	Love. Angel. Music. Baby.
"Cool"	2005	13	10	15	—	32	20	6	9	24	11	RIAA: Platinum; BPI: Silver; RMNZ: Gold	Love. Angel. Music. Baby.
"Luxurious" (solo or featuring Slim Thug)	2005	21	25	66	10	—	65	31	17	39	44	RIAA: Platinum; RMNZ: Platinum	Love. Angel. Music. Baby.
"Crash"	2006	49	—	—	—	—	—	—	—	—	—		Love. Angel. Music. Baby.
"Wind It Up"	2006	6	5	18	91	12	21	4	1	14	3	RIAA: Platinum; ARIA: Gold; RMNZ: Gold	The Sweet Escape
"The Sweet Escape" (featuring Akon)	2006	2	2	6	2	4	6	5	1	10	2	RIAA: 5× Platinum; ARIA: 2× Platinum; BPI: 3× Platinum; BVMI: Platinum; RMNZ: 5× Platinum	The Sweet Escape
"4 in the Morning"	2007	54	9	18	17	21	18	14	5	18	22	RIAA: Gold; ARIA: Platinum; RMNZ: Gold	The Sweet Escape
"Now That You Got It" (solo or featuring Damian Marley)	2007	—	37	60	—	—	73	—	21	—	59		The Sweet Escape
"Early Winter"	2008	—	—	22	—	—	6	—	—	12	—		The Sweet Escape
"Baby Don't Lie"	2014	46	53	—	21	58	26	22	36	—	—	RIAA: Gold	Non-album singles
"Spark the Fire"	2014	—	—	—	—	—	—	—	—	—	—		Non-album singles
"Used to Love You"	2015	52	58	—	57	—	—	—	—	—	157	RIAA: Gold	This Is What the Truth Feels Like
"Make Me Like You"	2016	54	97	—	62	81	—	—	—	—	140	RIAA: Gold	This Is What the Truth Feels Like
"Misery"	2016	— (Note: "Misery" did not enter the Billboard Hot 100, but peaked at number 11 on the Bubbling Under Hot 100 Singles chart.)	74	—	— (Note: "Misery" did not enter the Canadian Hot 100, but peaked at number 42 on the Canada Digital Song Sales chart.)	127	—	—	—	—	171		This Is What the Truth Feels Like
"You Make It Feel Like Christmas" (featuring Blake Shelton)	2017	46	38	29	40	—	30	— (Note: "You Make It Feel Like Christmas" did not enter the Dutch Top 40, but peaked at number 5 on the Single Tip chart.)	— (Note: "You Make It Feel Like Christmas" did not enter the NZ Top 40 Singles Chart, but peaked at number one on the NZ Heatseeker Singles Chart.)	39	69	RIAA: Platinum; BPI: Gold; BVMI: Gold; RMNZ: Gold	You Make It Feel Like Christmas
"Santa Baby"	2017	—	—	—	— (Note: "Santa Baby" did not enter the Canadian Hot 100, but peaked at number 38 on the Canada Adult Contemporary chart.)	—	—	—	—	—	—		You Make It Feel Like Christmas
"Secret Santa"	2018	—	—	—	—	—	—	—	—	—	—		You Make It Feel Like Christmas
"Nobody but You" (with Blake Shelton)	2020	18	— (Note: "Nobody but You" did not enter the ARIA Singles Chart, but peaked at number 31 on the ARIA Digital Track Chart.)	—	38	—	—	—	—	—	—	RIAA: 2× Platinum; MC: Platinum	Fully Loaded: God's Country
"Here This Christmas"	2020	—	—	—	—	—	—	—	—	—	—		You Make It Feel Like Christmas
"Let Me Reintroduce Myself"	2020	— (Note: "Let Me Reintroduce Myself" did not enter the Billboard Hot 100, but peaked at number 17 on the US Digital Song Sales chart.)	—	—	— (Note: "Let Me Reintroduce Myself" did not enter the Canadian Hot 100, but peaked at number 19 on the Canada Digital Song Sales chart.)	—	—	—	—	—	— (Note: "Let Me Reintroduce Myself" did not enter the UK Singles Chart, but peaked at number 90 on the UK Downloads chart.)		Non-album singles
"Slow Clap" (solo or with Saweetie)	2021	—	—	—	—	—	—	—	—	—	—		Non-album singles
"True Babe"	2023	—	—	—	—	—	—	—	—	—	—		Non-album singles
"Purple Irises" (with Blake Shelton)	2024	— (Note: "Purple Irises" did not enter the Billboard Hot 100, but peaked at number 15 on the US Digital Song Sales chart and number 40 on the US Hot Country Songs chart.)	—	—	— (Note: "Purple Irises" did not enter the Canadian Hot 100, but peaked at number 19 on the Canada Digital Song Sales chart.)	—	—	—	—	—	—		Bouquet
"Hello World (Song of the Olympics)" (with Anderson .Paak)	2024	—	—	—	—	—	—	—	—	—	—		Non-album single
"Somebody Else's"	2024	— (Note: "Somebody Else's" did not enter the Billboard Hot 100, but peaked at number 11 on the US Adult Pop Airplay chart.)	—	—	—	—	—	—	—	—	—		Bouquet
"Swallow My Tears"	2024	— (Note: "Swallow My Tears" did not enter the Billboard Hot 100, but peaked at number 22 on the US Adult Pop Airplay chart.)	—	—	—	—	—	—	—	—	—		Bouquet
"Still Gonna Love You"	2025	—	—	—	—	—	—	—	—	—	—		Bouquet
"Shake the Snow Globe"	2025	55	—	—	63	—	—	—	—	—	16		You Make It Feel Like Christmas
"—" denotes a recording that did not chart or was not released in that territory.

=== As featured artist ===
List of singles as featured artist, with selected chart positions and certifications, showing year released and album name
Title	Year	Peak chart positions										Certifications	Album
Title	Year	US	AUS	AUT	CAN	GER	NL	NOR	NZ	SWI	UK	Certifications	Album
"South Side" (Moby featuring Gwen Stefani)	2000	14	—	—	3	—	—	—	—	—	—		Play
"Let Me Blow Ya Mind" (Eve featuring Gwen Stefani)	2001	2	4	6	29	5	2	1	7	1	4	RIAA: 3× Platinum; ARIA: Platinum; BPI: Platinum; BVMI: Gold; IFPI NOR: Platinum; IFPI SWI: Gold; RMNZ: 4× Platinum	Scorpion
"What's Going On" (as part of Artists Against AIDS Worldwide)	2001	27	38	51	—	35	24	—	18	16	6	RMNZ: Gold	What's Going On: All-Star Tribute
"Can I Have It Like That" (Pharrell featuring Gwen Stefani)	2005	49	22	47	29	37	25	15	18	28	3		In My Mind
"Glycerine" (live) (Bush featuring Gwen Stefani)	2012	—	—	—	—	—	—	—	—	—	—		Non-album single
"Kings Never Die" (Eminem featuring Gwen Stefani)	2015	80	62	—	51	—	—	—	—	—	82	RIAA: Gold; ARIA: Gold; BPI: Silver; RMNZ: Gold	Southpaw
"Hands" (with various artists)	2016	—	—	—	—	—	—	—	—	—	—		Non-album single
"Happy Anywhere" (Blake Shelton featuring Gwen Stefani)	2020	32	—	—	41	—	—	—	—	—	—	RIAA: Platinum; MC: Platinum	Body Language
"Light My Fire" (Sean Paul featuring Gwen Stefani and Shenseea)	2022	—	—	—	—	—	—	—	—	—	—		Scorcha
"—" denotes a recording that did not chart or was not released in that territory.

=== Promotional singles ===
List of promotional singles, with selected chart positions, showing year released and album name
Title	Year	Peak chart positions				Album
Title	Year	US	US Country	US Holiday Digital	CAN	Album
"The Real Thing"	2005	—	—	—	—	Love. Angel. Music. Baby.
"Yummy" (featuring Pharrell)	2006	—	—	—	—	The Sweet Escape
"Shine" (featuring Pharrell Williams)	2015	—	—	—	—	Non-album single
"Go Ahead and Break My Heart" (Blake Shelton featuring Gwen Stefani)	2016	70	13	—	— (Note: "Go Ahead and Break My Heart" did not enter the Canadian Hot 100, but peaked at number 17 on the digital component chart.)	If I'm Honest
"Sleigh Ride"	2020	—	—	6	—	You Make It Feel Like Christmas
"Love Is Alive" (with Blake Shelton)	2023	— (Note: "Love Is Alive" did not enter the Billboard Hot 100, but peaked at number 37 on the US Digital Song Sales chart.)	— (Note: "Love Is Alive" did not enter the US Hot Country Songs chart, but peaked at number 25 on the US Country Digital Song Sales chart.)	—	—	A Tribute to the Judds
"Hangin' On" (with Blake Shelton)	2025	—	—	—	—	For Recreational Use Only
"—" denotes a recording that did not chart or was not released in that territory.

== Other charted songs ==
List of songs, with selected chart positions, showing year released and album name
Title	Year	Peak chart positions									Album
Title	Year	US	US Elec.	US Holiday Digital	CAN	CAN AC	FRA	MEX Air.	NZ Hot	UK	Album
"Together" (Calvin Harris featuring Gwen Stefani)	2014	—	25	—	—	—	—	—	—	—	Motion
"My Heart Is Open" (Maroon 5 featuring Gwen Stefani)	2014	— (Note: "My Heart Is Open" did not enter the Billboard Hot 100, but peaked at number seven on the Bubbling Under Hot 100 chart.)	—	—	94	—	—	—	—	—	V
"Jingle Bells"	2017	—	—	9	—	5	—	—	—	—	You Make It Feel Like Christmas
"Let It Snow"	2017	—	—	22	—	—	—	29	—	—	You Make It Feel Like Christmas
"My Gift Is You"	2017	—	—	6	—	—	—	—	—	—	You Make It Feel Like Christmas
"Silent Night"	2017	—	—	33	—	—	—	—	—	—	You Make It Feel Like Christmas
"When I Was a Little Girl"	2017	—	—	25	—	—	—	—	—	—	You Make It Feel Like Christmas
"Last Christmas"	2017	—	—	8	—	—	—	—	—	—	You Make It Feel Like Christmas
"Under the Christmas Lights"	2017	—	—	16	—	—	—	—	—	—	You Make It Feel Like Christmas
"White Christmas"	2017	—	—	27	—	39	—	—	—	62	You Make It Feel Like Christmas
"Never Kissed Anyone with Blue Eyes Before You"	2017	—	—	46	—	—	—	—	—	—	You Make It Feel Like Christmas
"Christmas Eve"	2017	—	—	20	—	—	—	—	—	—	You Make It Feel Like Christmas
"Santa Claus Is Coming to Town"	2018	—	—	38	—	—	—	—	—	—	You Make It Feel Like Christmas
"Cheer for the Elves"	2018	—	—	28	—	—	—	—	—	—	You Make It Feel Like Christmas
"Winter Wonderland"	2018	—	—	31	—	—	—	—	—	—	You Make It Feel Like Christmas
"Feliz Navidad" (featuring Mon Laferte)	2018	—	—	34	—	—	—	30	—	—	You Make It Feel Like Christmas
"Physical (Mark Ronson Remix)" (Dua Lipa featuring Gwen Stefani)	2020	—	—	—	—	—	116	—	33	—	Club Future Nostalgia
"—" denotes a recording that did not chart or was not released in that territory.

== Guest appearances ==
List of non-single guest appearances, with other performing artists, showing year released and album name
Title	Year	Other artist(s)	Album
"Saw Red"	1994	Sublime	Robbin' the Hood
"Almost Blue"	1998	None	Stormy Weather
"You're the Boss"	1998	The Brian Setzer Orchestra	The Dirty Boogie
"So Far, So Pleased"	1999	Prince	Rave Un2 the Joy Fantastic
"Everybody Is a Star"	2000	Fishbone	The Psychotic Friends Nuttwerx
"Let's Go Ride Horses"	2001	Eric Stefani	Let's Go Ride Horses
"Strawberry Fields"	2001	Eric Stefani	Let's Go Ride Horses
"Slave to Love"	2004	Elan Atias	50 First Dates
"All Nighter"	2006	Elan Atias	Together as One
"U n Me (Together Alwayz)"	2009	Bone Thugs-n-Harmony	Uni5: The Prequel
"Need You Tonight"	2011	INXS	The Very Best
"Run Away"	2015	Snoop Dogg	Bush
"Rainbow Connection"	2015	None	We Love Disney
"It's a Small World"	2015	We Love Disney artists	We Love Disney
"Leather and Lace"	2015	Jeffery Austin	The Voice: The Complete Season 9 Collection
"Hair Up"	2016	Justin Timberlake; Ron Funches	Trolls: Original Motion Picture Soundtrack
"Move Your Feet" / "D.A.N.C.E." / "It's a Sunshine Day"	2016	Trolls cast	Trolls: Original Motion Picture Soundtrack
"I'm Coming Out" / "Mo' Money Mo' Problems"	2016	Trolls cast	Trolls: Original Motion Picture Soundtrack
"Can't Stop the Feeling!" (film version)	2016	Trolls cast	Trolls: Original Motion Picture Soundtrack
"What U Workin' With?"	2016	Justin Timberlake	Trolls: Original Motion Picture Soundtrack
"Medicine Man"	2017	None	Served Like a Girl
"Holding On"	2024	Andrea Bocelli	Duets (30th Anniversary)

== Videography ==
=== Video albums ===
List of video albums, with selected chart positions and certifications
Title	Album details	Peak chart positions		Certifications
Title	Album details	US	AUS	Certifications
Harajuku Lovers Live	Released: December 5, 2006; Label: Interscope; Format: DVD	25	28	ARIA: Platinum

=== Music videos ===
List of music videos, showing year released and directors
Title	Year	Director(s)
"South Side" (Moby featuring Gwen Stefani)	2000	Joseph Kahn
"Let Me Blow Ya Mind" (Eve featuring Gwen Stefani)	2001	Philip Atwell
"What You Waiting For?"	2004	Francis Lawrence
"Rich Girl" (featuring Eve)	2004	David LaChapelle
"Hollaback Girl"	2005	Paul Hunter
"Cool"	2005	Sophie Muller
"Can I Have It Like That" (Pharrell featuring Gwen Stefani)	2005	Paul Hunter
"Luxurious" (featuring Slim Thug)	2005	Sophie Muller
"Serious"	2005	Sophie Muller
"Crash"	2006	Sophie Muller
"Wind It Up"	2006	Sophie Muller
"The Sweet Escape" (featuring Akon)	2006	Joseph Kahn
"4 in the Morning"	2007	Sophie Muller
"Now That You Got It" (featuring Damian Marley)	2007	The Saline Project
"Early Winter"	2007	Sophie Muller
"Baby Don't Lie"	2014	Sophie Muller; Weirdcore
"Spark the Fire"	2014	Sophie Muller
"Used to Love You"	2015	Sophie Muller
"Make Me Like You"	2016	Sophie Muller
"Misery"	2016	Sophie Muller
"Kuu Kuu Harajuku"	2016	Sophie Muller
"You Make It Feel Like Christmas" (featuring Blake Shelton)	2018	Sophie Muller
"Feliz Navidad" (featuring Mon Laferte)	2018	Unknown
"Nobody but You" (with Blake Shelton)	2020	Sophie Muller
"Happy Anywhere" (Blake Shelton featuring Gwen Stefani)	2020	Todd Stefani
"Here This Christmas"	2020	Unknown
"Let Me Reintroduce Myself"	2021	Philip Andelman
"Slow Clap" (with Saweetie)	2021	Sophie Muller
"Slow Clap"	2021	Matty Peacock
"Light My Fire" (Sean Paul featuring Gwen Stefani)	2022	Quinn Wilson
"Somebody Else's"	2024	Andrew Donoho
"Shake the Snow Globe"	2025	Mike Ho

== See also ==
- No Doubt discography
