= List of songs recorded by Gwen Stefani =

Songs by American singer

- Category: Songs
Released Songs	116
Unreleased Songs	0
Total	116

American singer Gwen Stefani has recorded material for five studio albums and two extended plays (EP), and has been featured on songs on other artists' respective albums. After releasing five studio albums with ska punk group No Doubt, in 2004 Stefani began work as a solo artist, developing her pop debut Love. Angel. Music. Baby. in the same year. It produced several top ten singles worldwide, including "What You Waiting For?", "Rich Girl", and "Hollaback Girl", the latter of which was the first single to sell over a million digital copies in the United States. The record contained work from a variety of producers and songwriters, including Linda Perry, Nellee Hooper, André 3000, and No Doubt bandmate Tony Kanal. "Cool", "Luxurious", and "Crash" were also released as the singles. In 2005, Stefani released an extended play, Love. Angel. Music. Baby. (The Remixes), which included the Richard X remix of "Cool", which topped the United States Dance Club Songs in November 2005. Hip hop musician André 3000 made two appearances on the album, including on "Long Way to Go", and his alter ego "Johnny Vulture" on "Bubble Pop Electric".

Following the release of Love. Angel. Music. Baby., Stefani decided to release a studio album containing a mixture of leftover tracks and newly recorded ones, titled The Sweet Escape (2006). The record featured Stefani rapping on several tracks, but also contained the dance-pop genre that was explored on Love. Angel. Music. Baby.. It yielded two more top ten singles, "Wind it Up" and "The Sweet Escape", both released in 2006; the latter track became the singer's second single to reach number two on the Billboard Hot 100, following her collaboration "Let Me Blow Ya Mind" with Eve in 2001. Themes from the record include fashion, in addition to romantic situations and details of her career and personal life. Stefani took a hiatus from her solo career to continue work on a sixth studio album with No Doubt, Push and Shove, which was released in late 2012. A line of non-album singles was released following the aforementioned record, including "Baby Don't Lie" and "Spark the Fire", both released in 2014. Stefani's third album This Is What the Truth Feels Like, was released on March 18, 2016, included the singles "Used to Love You", "Make Me Like You", and "Misery". Unlike her previous work, the record dealt with her divorce and "falling in love again". American rapper Fetty Wap appears on album track "Asking 4 It", which was produced by Stargate. You Make It Feel Like Christmas, Stefani's 2017 Christmas album is a mix of six classic holiday songs and six brand new tracks. It was fronted by lead single "You Make It Feel Like Christmas".

The singer has also recorded songs for film soundtracks, including a verse for a collaboration with rapper Eminem: "Kings Never Die" from Southpaw and "Shine" for Paddington. In September 2016, Stefani appeared on Trolls: Original Motion Picture Soundtrack, contributing to "Hair Up", "What U Workin' With?", and three other ensembles with Justin Timberlake.

== Songs ==
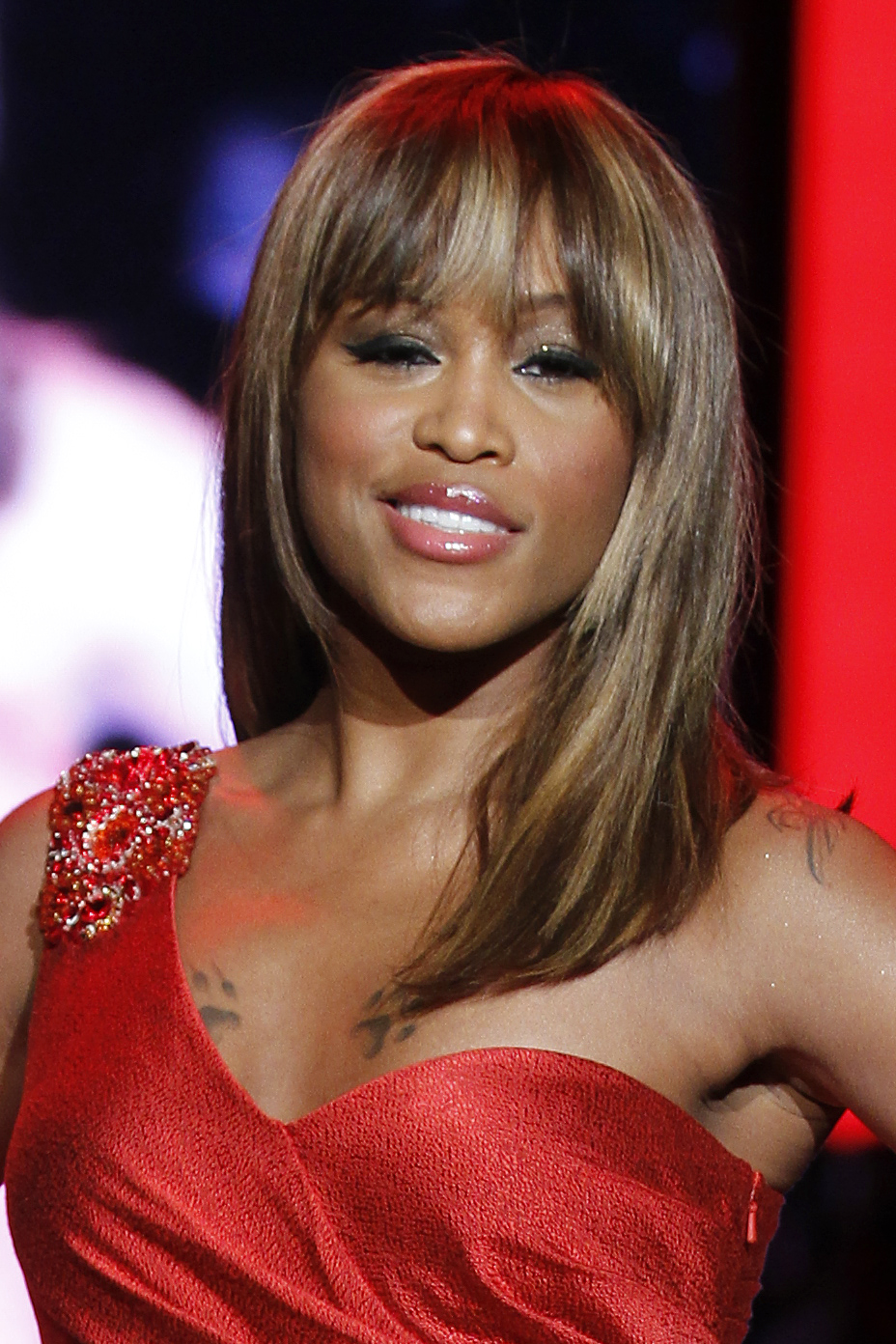
Eve collaborated with Stefani on "Let Me Blow Ya Mind" in 2001 and "Rich Girl" in 2004.

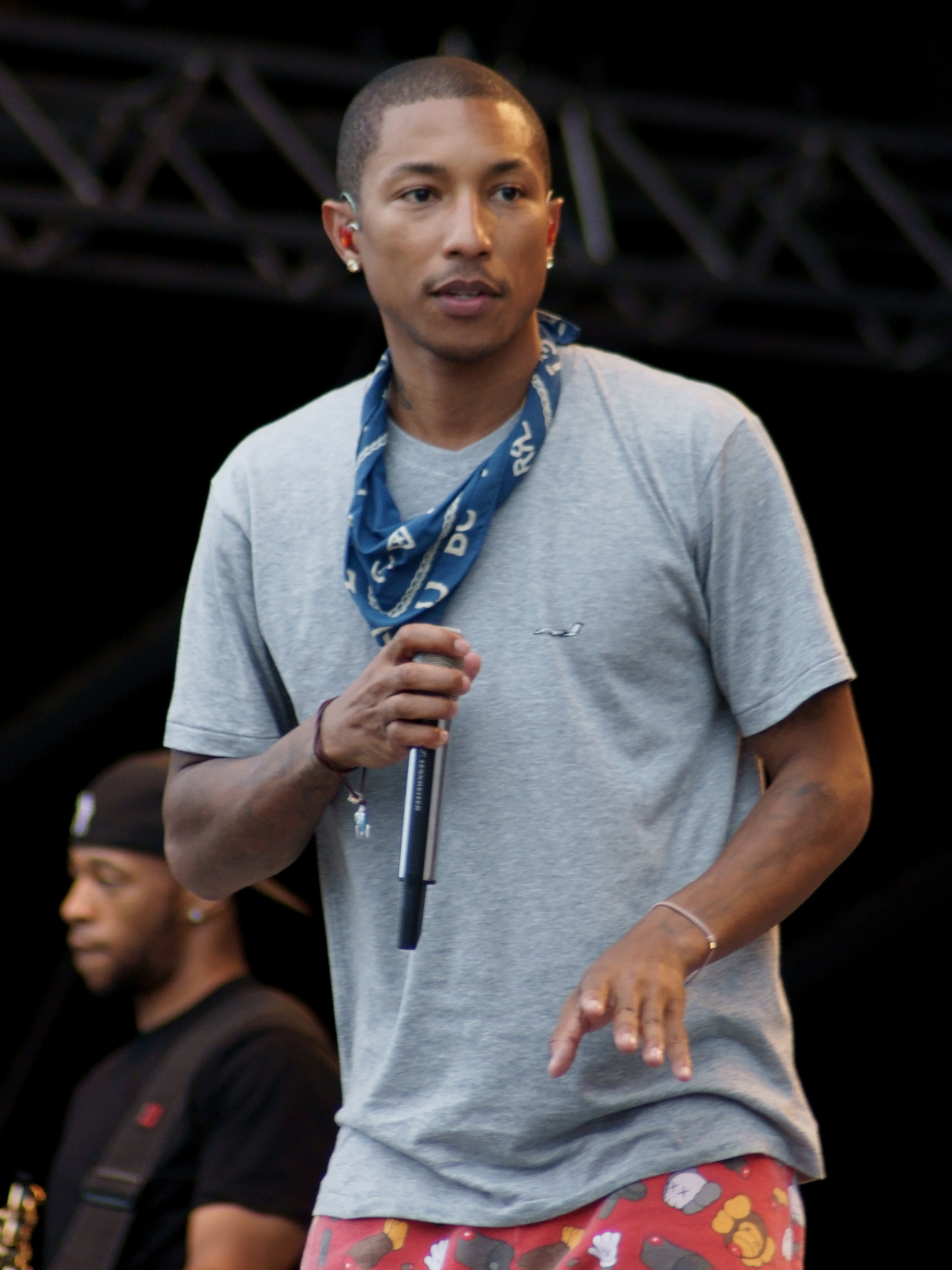
Pharrell Williams served as an executive producer for Stefani's first two solo albums.

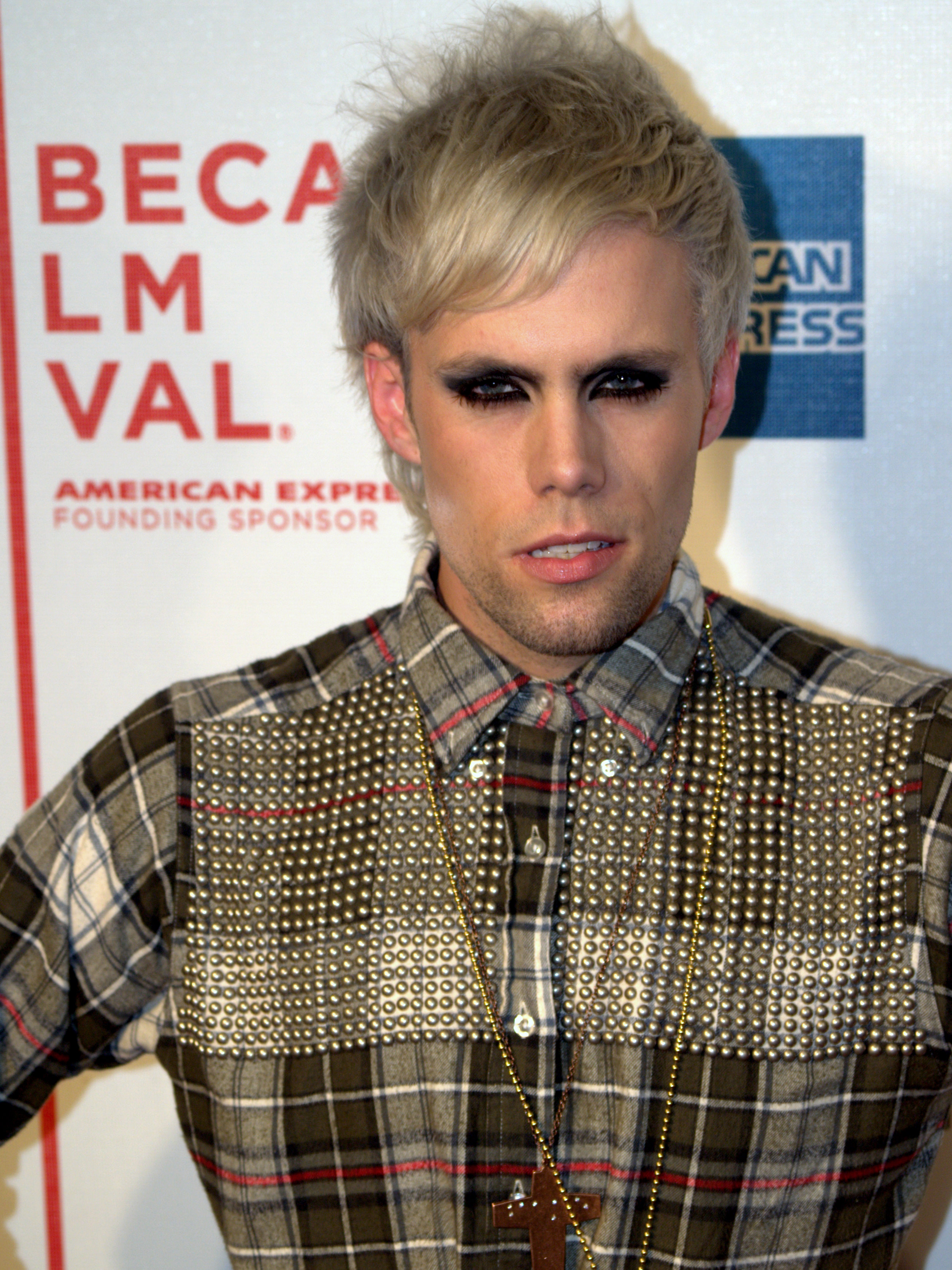
The singer and Justin Tranter collaborated on 18 songs for This Is What the Truth Feels Like in 2016.

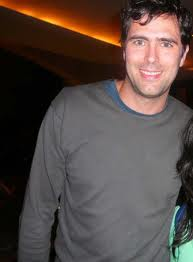
Keane's Tim Rice-Oxley worked with Stefani on "Early Winter", the fifth and final single from The Sweet Escape.

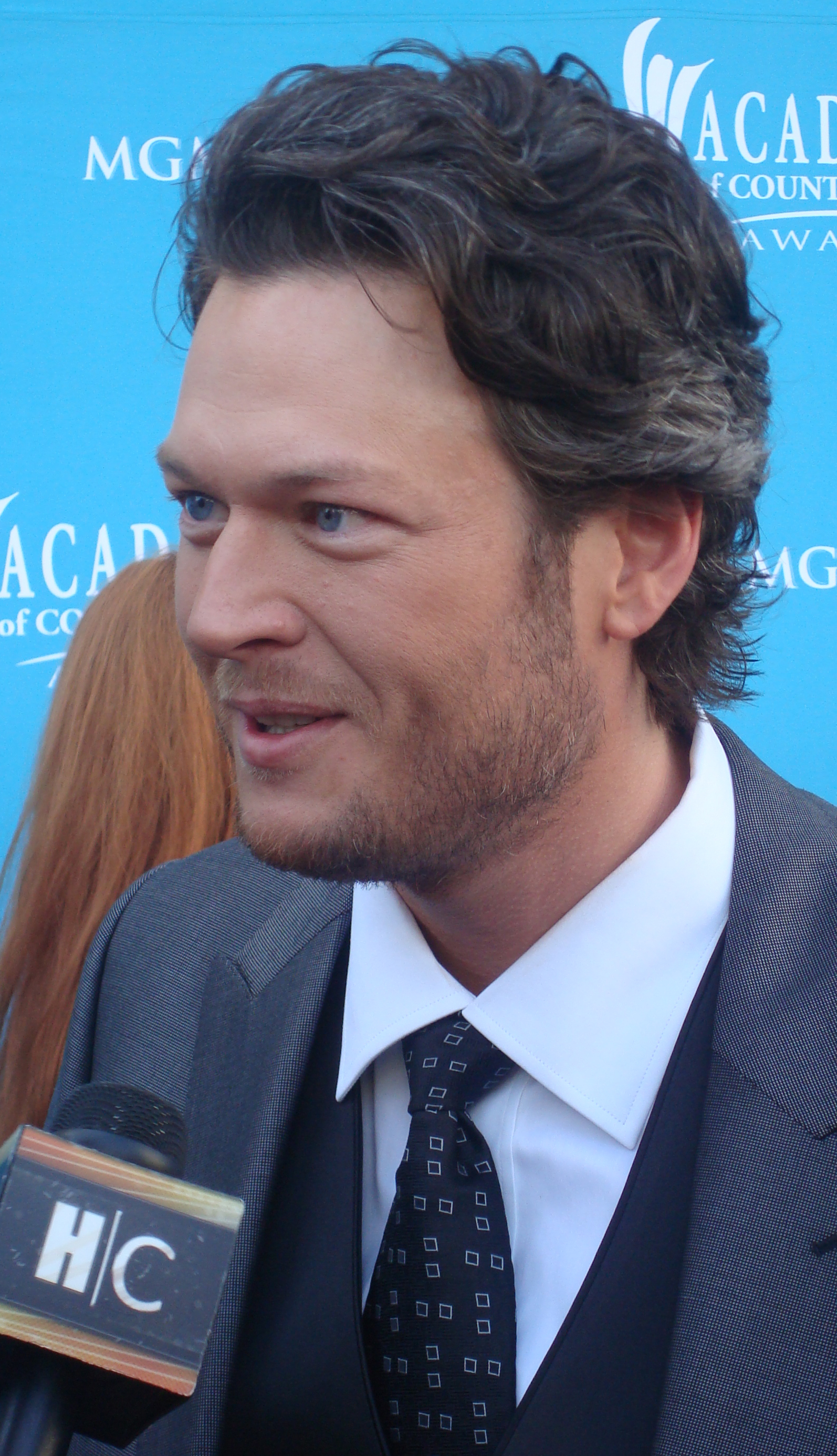
Stefani provided guest vocals on Blake Shelton's "Go Ahead and Break My Heart" in 2016.

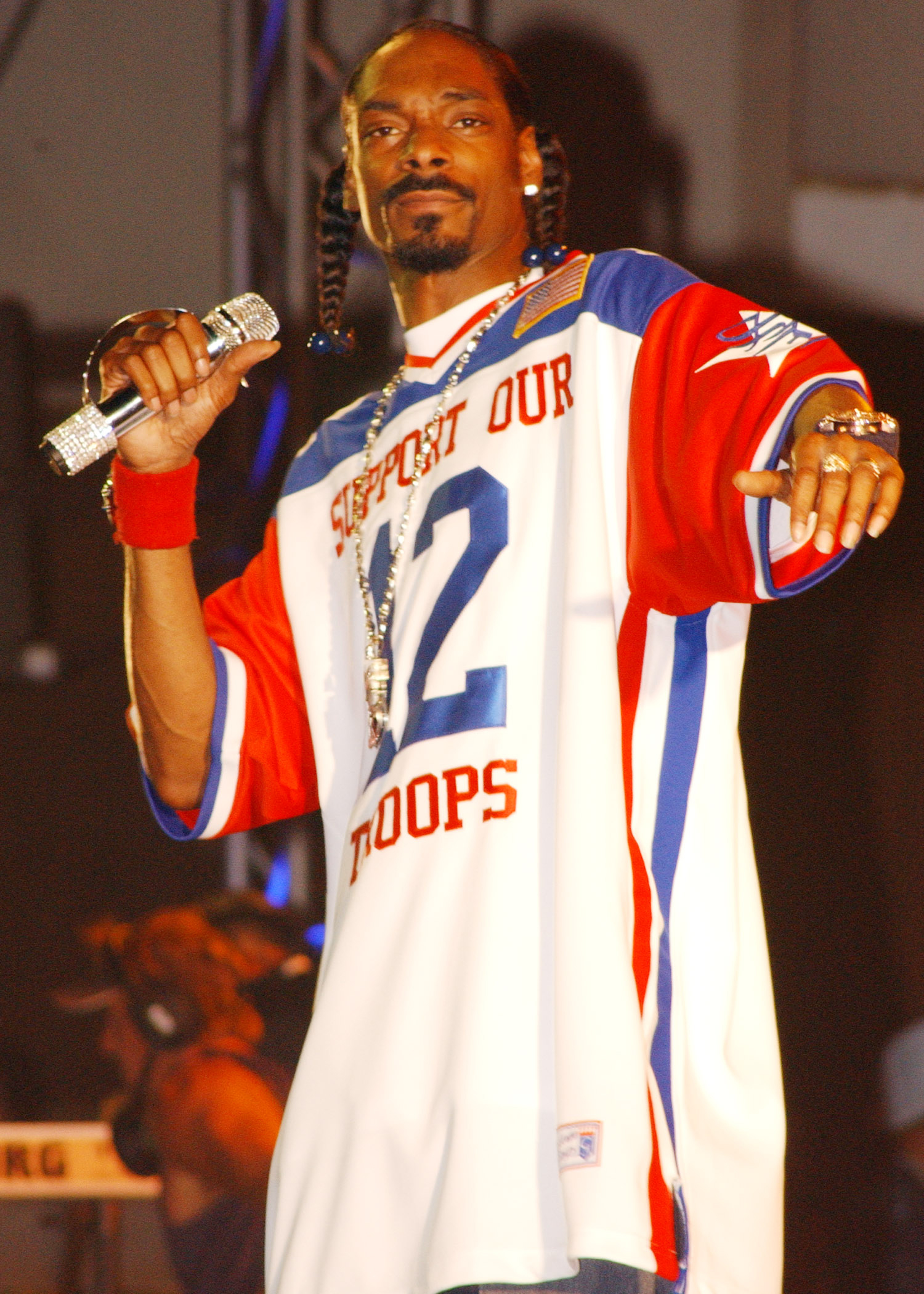
"Run Away" by Snoop Dogg includes Stefani's vocals.

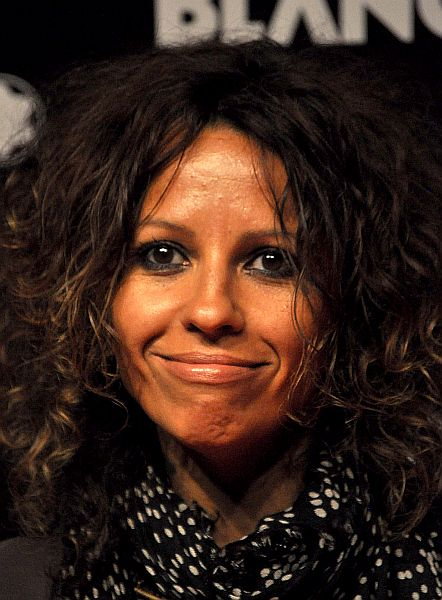
Linda Perry wrote and produced several songs for Stefani's first two studio albums.

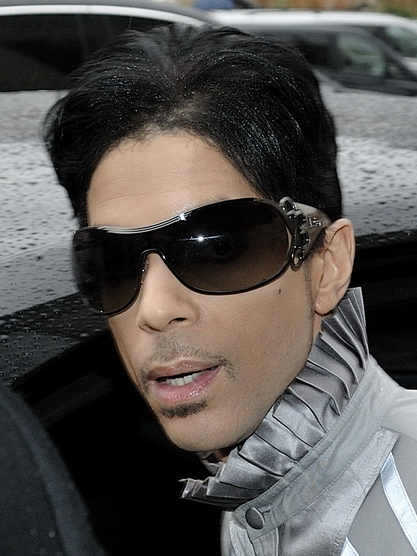
Prince and Stefani wrote duet "So Far, So Pleased" in 1999.

Name of song, featured performers, writers, originating album, and year released.
Song	Artist(s)	Writer(s)	Album	Year	Ref(s).
"4 in the Morning"	Gwen Stefani	Gwen Stefani; Tony Kanal	The Sweet Escape	2006	
"All Your Fault"	Gwen Stefani	Diane Warren	Bouquet	2024	
"Allnighter"	Elan Atias featuring Gwen Stefani	Elan Atias; Tony Kanal	Together as One	2006	
"Almost Blue"	Gwen Stefani	Elvis Costello	Stormy Weather	1998	
"Asking 4 It"	Gwen Stefani featuring Fetty Wap	Gwen Stefani; Justin Tranter; Julia Michaels; Tor Hermansen; Mikkel Eriksen; Willie Maxwell II	This Is What the Truth Feels Like	2016	
"Baby Don't Lie"	Gwen Stefani	Gwen Stefani; Ryan Tedder; Benny Blanco; Noel Zancanella	Non-album single	2014	
"Bouquet"	Gwen Stefani	Gwen Stefani; Fred Ball; Mark Landon; Nick Long; Madison Love; Henry Walter	Bouquet	2024	
"Breakin' Up"	Gwen Stefani	Gwen Stefani; Pharrell Williams	The Sweet Escape	2006	
"Bubble Pop Electric"	Gwen Stefani featuring Johnny Vulture	Gwen Stefani; Johnny Vulture; Seven	Love. Angel. Music. Baby.	2004	
"Can I Have It Like That"	Pharrell Williams featuring Gwen Stefani	Pharrell Williams	In My Mind	2006	
"Can't Stop the Feeling!"	Trolls cast	Justin Timberlake; Max Martin; Shellback	Trolls: Original Motion Picture Soundtrack	2016	
"Cheer for the Elves"	Gwen Stefani	Gwen Stefani; Justin Tranter busbee	You Make It Feel Like Christmas	2018	
"Christmas Eve"	Gwen Stefani	Gwen Stefani; Justin Tranter busbee	You Make It Feel Like Christmas	2017	
"Cool"	Gwen Stefani	Gwen Stefani; Dallas Austin	Love. Angel. Music. Baby.	2004	
"Crash"	Gwen Stefani	Gwen Stefani; Tony Kanal	Love. Angel. Music. Baby.	2004	
"Danger Zone"	Gwen Stefani	Gwen Stefani; Dallas Austin; Linda Perry	Love. Angel. Music. Baby.	2004	
"Don't Get It Twisted"	Gwen Stefani	Gwen Stefani; Tony Kanal	The Sweet Escape	2006	
"Early Winter"	Gwen Stefani	Gwen Stefani; Tim Rice-Oxley	The Sweet Escape	2006	
"Empty Vase"	Gwen Stefani	Gwen Stefani; Nick Long; Madison Love; Henry Walter	Bouquet	2024	
"Everybody Is a Star"	Fishbone featuring Gwen Stefani	Sly Stone	The Psychotic Friends Nuttwerx	2000	
"Feliz Navidad"	Gwen Stefani featuring Mon Laferte	José Feliciano	You Make It Feel Like Christmas	2018	
"Fluorescent"	Gwen Stefani	Gwen Stefani; Tony Kanal	The Sweet Escape	2006	
"Getting Warmer"	Gwen Stefani	Gwen Stefani; Justin Tranter; Julia Michaels; Jonathan "J.R." Rotem; Mike Green	This Is What the Truth Feels Like	2016	
"Go Ahead and Break My Heart"	Blake Shelton featuring Gwen Stefani	Blake Shelton; Gwen Stefani	If I'm Honest	2016	
"Glycerine (Live)"	Bush featuring Gwen Stefani	Gavin Rossdale	Non-album single	2012	
"Hair Up"	Justin Timberlake, Gwen Stefani and Ron Funches	Justin Timberlake; Max Martin; Oscar Holter; Shellback; Savan Kotecha	Trolls: Original Motion Picture Soundtrack	2016	
"Hands"	Artists for Orlando	Justin Tranter; Julia Michaels; BloodPop	Non-album single	2016	
"Hangin' On"	Blake Shelton featuring Gwen Stefani	Sam Ellis; Greylan James; Charles Kelley	For Recreational Use Only	2025	
"Happy Anywhere"	Blake Shelton featuring Gwen Stefani	Ross Copperman; Josh Osborne; Matt Jenkins	Body Language	2020	
"Harajuku Girls"	Gwen Stefani	Gwen Stefani; James Harris III; Terry Lewis; James Quenton Wright; Bobby Ross Avila; Issiah J. Avila	Love. Angel. Music. Baby.	2004	
"Hello World"	Gwen Stefani and Anderson .Paak	Anderson .Paak; Tyler Spry; Ryan Tedder	Non-album single	2024	
"Here This Christmas"	Gwen Stefani	Brent Kutzle; Josh Varnadore; Ryan Tedder	You Make It Feel Like Christmas	2020	
"Holding On"	Andrea Bocelli featuring Gwen Stefani	Amy Lee; Amy Wadge; Chad Vaccarino; Ian Axel	Duets (30th Anniversary)	2024	
"Hollaback Girl"	Gwen Stefani	Gwen Stefani; Pharrell Williams; Chad Hugo	Love. Angel. Music. Baby.	2004	
"Hot Cocoa"	Gwen Stefani	Gwen Stefani; Spencer Stewart	You Make It Feel Like Christmas	2025	
"I'm Coming Out" / "Mo' Money Mo' Problems"	Trolls cast	See Audio Beds; Nile Rodgers; Sean Combs; Bernard Edwards; The Notorious B.I.G. Mason Betha; Steve Jordan	Trolls: Original Motion Picture Soundtrack	2016	
"It's a Small World"	We Love Disney Artists	Sherman Brothers	We Love Disney	2015	
"Jingle Bells"	Gwen Stefani	James Lord Pierpont	You Make It Feel Like Christmas	2017	
"Kings Never Die"	Eminem featuring Gwen Stefani	Luis Resto; Khalil Abdul-Rahman; Erik Alcock; Chin Injeti; Liz Rodrigues	Southpaw	2015	
"Last Christmas"	Gwen Stefani	George Michael	You Make It Feel Like Christmas	2017	
"Late to Bloom"	Gwen Stefani	Gwen Stefani; Mark Landon; Nick Long; Madison Love; Henry Walter	Bouquet	2024	
"Leather and Lace"	Jeffery Austin and Gwen Stefani	Stevie Nicks	Non-album single	2015	
"Let It Snow"	Gwen Stefani	Sammy Cahn; Jule Styne	You Make It Feel Like Christmas	2017	
"Let Me Blow Ya Mind"	Eve featuring Gwen Stefani	Eve Jihan Jeffers; Andre Young; Mike Elizondo; Scott Storch; Steven Jordan	Scorpion	2001	
"Let Me Reintroduce Myself"	Gwen Stefani	Gwen Stefani; Luke Niccoli; Ross Golan	Non-album single	2020	
"Let's Go Ride Horses"	Eric Stefani featuring Gwen Stefani	Eric Stefani	Let's Go Ride Horses	2001	
"Light My Fire"	Sean Paul featuring Gwen Stefani & Shenseea	Gamal Lewis; Rosina Russell; Allan Grigg; Gwen Stefani; Chinsea Lee; Sean Paul Henriques	Scorcha	2022	
"Long Way to Go"	Gwen Stefani and André 3000	Gwen Stefani; André Benjamin	Love. Angel. Music. Baby.	2004	
"Love Is Alive"	Gwen Stefani and Blake Shelton	Kent Robbins	A Tribute to the Judds	2023	
"Loveable"	Gwen Stefani	Gwen Stefani; Justin Tranter; Raja Kumari; Jonathan "J.R." Rotem	This Is What the Truth Feels Like	2016	
"Luxurious"	Gwen Stefani	Gwen Stefani; Tony Kanal; Ronald Isley; O'Kelly Isley; Rudolph Isley; Ernie Isley; Marvin Isley; Chris Jasper	Love. Angel. Music. Baby.	2004	
"Luxurious (Remix)"	Gwen Stefani featuring Slim Thug	Gwen Stefani; Tony Kanal; Ronald Isley; O'Kelly Isley; Rudolph Isley; Ernie Isley; Marvin Isley; Chris Jasper	Non-album single	2005	
"Make Me Like You"	Gwen Stefani	Gwen Stefani; Justin Tranter; Julia Michaels; Mattias Larsson; Robin Fredriksson	This Is What the Truth Feels Like	2016	
"Marigolds"	Gwen Stefani	Gwen Stefani; Svante Halldin; Jakob Hazell; Niko Rubio	Bouquet	2024	
"Me Without You"	Gwen Stefani	Gwen Stefani; Justin Tranter; Julia Michaels; Jonathan "J.R." Rotem	This Is What the Truth Feels Like	2016	
"Medicine Man"	Gwen Stefani	Gwen Stefani; Linda Perry	Served Like a Girl	2017	
"Misery"	Gwen Stefani	Gwen Stefani; Justin Tranter; Julia Michaels; Mattias Larsson; Robin Fredriksson	This Is What the Truth Feels Like	2016	
"Move Your Feet" / "D.A.N.C.E." / "It's a Sunshine Day"	Trolls cast	Jesper Mortensen; See Audio Beds; Gaspard Augé; Stephen McCarthy; Jessie Chaton; Xavier de Rosnay	Trolls: Original Motion Picture Soundtrack	2016	
"My Gift Is You"	Gwen Stefani	Gwen Stefani; Justin Tranter busbee	You Make It Feel Like Christmas	2017	
"My Heart Is Open"	Maroon 5 featuring Gwen Stefani	Adam Levine; Benjamin Levin; Sia Furler; Rodney Jerkins; Andre Lindal	V	2014	
"Naughty"	Gwen Stefani	Gwen Stefani; Justin Tranter; Raja Kumari; Jonathan "J.R." Rotem	This Is What the Truth Feels Like	2016	
"Need You Tonight"	INXS vs. Gwen Stefani	Andrew Farriss; Michael Hutchence	The Very Best	2011	
"Never Kissed Anyone with Blue Eyes Before You"	Gwen Stefani	Gwen Stefani; Justin Tranter busbee	You Make It Feel Like Christmas	2017	
"Nobody but You"	Blake Shelton and Gwen Stefani	Ross Copperman; Shane McAnally; Josh Osborne; Tommy Lee James	Fully Loaded: God's Country	2019	
"Now That You Got It"	Gwen Stefani	Gwen Stefani; Sean Garrett; Kaseem Dean	The Sweet Escape	2006	
"Now That You Got It (Remix)"	Gwen Stefani featuring Damian Marley	Gwen Stefani; Sean Garrett; Kaseem Dean	Non-album single	2007	
"Now That You're Gone"	Eric Stefani featuring Gwen Stefani	Eric Stefani	Let's Go Ride Horses	2001	
"Obsessed"	Gwen Stefani	Gwen Stefani; Justin Tranter; Raja Kumari; Jonathan "J.R." Rotem	This Is What the Truth Feels Like	2016	
"Orange County Girl"	Gwen Stefani	Gwen Stefani; Pharrell Williams	The Sweet Escape	2006	
"Physical (Mark Ronson Remix)"	Dua Lipa featuring Gwen Stefani	Dua Lipa; Jason Evigan; Clarence Coffee Jr. Sarah Hudson	Club Future Nostalgia	2020	
"Pretty"	Gwen Stefani	Gwen Stefani; Nick Long; Madison Love; Henry Walter	Bouquet	2024	
"Purple Irises"	Gwen Stefani and Blake Shelton	Gwen Stefani; Svante Halldin; Jakob Hazell; Niko Rubio	Bouquet	2024	
"Rainbow Connection"	Gwen Stefani	Paul Williams; Kenny Ascher	We Love Disney	2015	
"Rare"	Gwen Stefani	Gwen Stefani; Justin Tranter; Julia Michaels; Greg Kurstin	This Is What the Truth Feels Like	2016	
"The Real Thing"	Gwen Stefani	Gwen Stefani; Linda Perry; GMR	Love. Angel. Music. Baby.	2004	
"Red Flag"	Gwen Stefani	Gwen Stefani; Justin Tranter; Raja Kumari; Jonathan "J.R." Rotem	This Is What the Truth Feels Like	2016	
"Reminders"	Gwen Stefani	Gwen Stefani; Ilsey Juber; Stephen McGregor	Bouquet	2024	
"Rich Girl"	Gwen Stefani featuring Eve	Mark Batson; Jerry Bock; Kara DioGuardi; Mike Elizondo; Eve Jihan Jeffers; Sheldon Harnick; Chantal Kreviazuk; Gwen Stefani; Andre Young	Love. Angel. Music. Baby.	2004	
"Rocket Ship"	Gwen Stefani	Gwen Stefani; Justin Tranter; Julia Michaels; Jonathan "J.R." Rotem; Teal Douville	This Is What the Truth Feels Like	2016	
"Run Away"	Snoop Dogg featuring Gwen Stefani	Brent Paschke; Calvin Broadus Jr. Pharrell Williams	Bush	2015	
"Santa Baby"	Gwen Stefani	Joan Javits; Philip Springer; Anthony Fred Springer	You Make It Feel Like Christmas	2017	
"Santa Claus Is Coming to Town"	Gwen Stefani	John Frederick Coots; Haven Gillespie	You Make It Feel Like Christmas	2018	
"Saw Red"	Sublime featuring Gwen Stefani	Sublime	Robbin' the Hood	1994	
"Secret Santa"	Gwen Stefani	Gwen Stefani; Justin Tranter busbee	You Make It Feel Like Christmas	2018	
"Send Me a Picture"	Gwen Stefani	Gwen Stefani; Justin Tranter; Julia Michaels; Greg Kurstin	This Is What the Truth Feels Like	2016	
"Serious"	Gwen Stefani	Gwen Stefani; Tony Kanal	Love. Angel. Music. Baby.	2004	
"Shake the Snow Globe"	Gwen Stefani	Gwen Stefani; Spencer Stewart; Madison Love; Sean Douglas	You Make It Feel Like Christmas	2025	
"Shine"	Gwen Stefani featuring Pharrell Williams	Gwen Stefani; Pharrell Williams	Non-album single	2015	
"Silent Night"	Gwen Stefani	Joseph Mohr; Franz Xaver Gruber	You Make It Feel Like Christmas	2017	
"Slave to Love"	Elan Atias featuring Gwen Stefani	Bryan Ferry	50 First Dates: Love Songs from the Original Motion Picture	2004	
"Sleigh Ride"	Gwen Stefani	Leroy Anderson; Mitchell Parish	You Make It Feel Like Christmas	2020	
"Slow Clap"	Gwen Stefani	Gwen Stefani; Luke Niccoli; Ross Golan	Non-album single	2021	
"Slow Clap (Remix)"	Gwen Stefani and Saweetie	Gwen Stefani; Luke Niccoli; Ross Golan; Diamonté Harper; Kameron Glasper; Tayla Parx	Non-album single	2021	
"So Far, So Pleased"	Prince featuring Gwen Stefani	Prince	Rave Un2 the Joy Fantastic	1999	
"Somebody Else's"	Gwen Stefani	Gwen Stefani; Fred Ball; Jacob Kasher Hindlin; Nick Long; Madison Love; Jake Torrey; Henry Walter	Bouquet	2024	
"South Side"	Moby featuring Gwen Stefani	Moby	Play	1999	
"Spark the Fire"	Gwen Stefani	Gwen Stefani; Pharrell Williams	Non-album single	2014	
"Splash"	Gwen Stefani	Gwen Stefani; Justin Tranter; Raja Kumari; Jonathan "J.R." Rotem	This Is What the Truth Feels Like	2016	
"Still Gonna Love You"	Gwen Stefani	Gwen Stefani; Finneas O'Connell	Bouquet	2025	
"Strawberry Fields"	Eric Stefani featuring Gwen Stefani	Lennon–McCartney	Let's Go Ride Horses	2001	
"Swallow My Tears"	Gwen Stefani	Gwen Stefani; Jacob Kasher Hindlin; Nick Long; Madison Love; Henry Walter	Bouquet	2024	
"The Sweet Escape"	Gwen Stefani featuring Akon	Gwen Stefani; Aliaune Thiam; Giorgio Tuinfort	The Sweet Escape	2006	
"Together"	Calvin Harris featuring Gwen Stefani	Calvin Harris; Gwen Stefani; Benjamin Levin; Ryan Tedder	Motion	2014	
"Truth"	Gwen Stefani	Gwen Stefani; Justin Tranter; Julia Michaels; Mattias Larsson; Robin Fredriksson	This Is What the Truth Feels Like	2016	
"U n Me (Together Alwayz)"	Bone Thugs-n-Harmony featuring Gwen Stefani	Steven Howse; Anthony Henderson; Charles Scruggs; Stanley Howse; Bryon McCane; Eric Stefani; Gwen Stefani	Uni5 the Prequel	2010	
"U Started It"	Gwen Stefani	Gwen Stefani; Pharrell Williams	The Sweet Escape	2006	
"Under the Christmas Lights"	Gwen Stefani	Gwen Stefani; Justin Tranter busbee	You Make It Feel Like Christmas	2017	
"Used to Love You"	Gwen Stefani	Gwen Stefani; Justin Tranter; Julia Michaels; Jonathan "J.R." Rotem; Teal Douville	This Is What the Truth Feels Like	2016	
"War Paint"	Gwen Stefani	Gwen Stefani; Justin Tranter; Raja Kumari; Jonathan "J.R." Rotem; Lovy Longomba; Teal Douville; Ivan Corraliza	This Is What the Truth Feels Like	2016	
"What U Workin' With?"	Gwen Stefani and Justin Timberlake	Justin Timberlake; Max Martin; Ilya Salmanzadeh; Shellback; Peter Svensson	Trolls: Original Motion Picture Soundtrack	2016	
"What You Waiting For?"	Gwen Stefani	Gwen Stefani; Linda Perry	Love. Angel. Music. Baby.	2004	
"What's Going On"	Artists Against; AIDS Worldwide	Al Cleveland; Renaldo Benson; Marvin Gaye	Non-album single	2001	
"When I Was a Little Girl"	Gwen Stefani	Gwen Stefani; Justin Tranter busbee	You Make It Feel Like Christmas	2017	
"Where Would I Be?"	Gwen Stefani	Gwen Stefani; Justin Tranter; Julia Michaels; Greg Kurstin	This Is What the Truth Feels Like	2016	
"White Christmas"	Gwen Stefani	Irving Berlin	You Make It Feel Like Christmas	2017	
"Wind It Up"	Gwen Stefani	Gwen Stefani; Pharrell Williams; Richard Rodgers; Oscar Hammerstein II	The Sweet Escape	2006	
"Winter Wonderland"	Gwen Stefani	Felix Bernard; Richard B. Smith	You Make It Feel Like Christmas	2018	
"Wonderful Life"	Gwen Stefani	Gwen Stefani; Linda Perry	The Sweet Escape	2006	
"You Make It Feel Like Christmas"	Gwen Stefani featuring Blake Shelton	Gwen Stefani; Blake Shelton; Justin Tranter busbee	You Make It Feel Like Christmas	2017	
"You're My Favorite"	Gwen Stefani	Gwen Stefani; Justin Tranter; Julia Michaels; Greg Kurstin	This Is What the Truth Feels Like	2016	
"You're the Boss"	The Brian Setzer Orchestra featuring Gwen Stefani	Jerry Leiber; Mike Stoller	The Dirty Boogie	1998	
"Yummy"	Gwen Stefani featuring Pharrell Williams	Gwen Stefani; Pharrell Williams	The Sweet Escape	2006	
