= Swallow My Tears =

2024 single by Gwen Stefani

Single by Gwen Stefani

from the album Bouquet
- Released: October 25, 2024
- Studio: Smoakstack Studios (Nashville); GS Glam Room (Los Angeles); Pickle Sans Studios (Nashville)
- Genre: Country pop
- Length: 2:53
- Label: Interscope
- Songwriters: Gwen Stefani; Jacob Kasher Hindlin; Nick Long; Madison Love; Henry Walter
- Producer: Scott Hendricks

Gwen Stefani singles chronology
"Somebody Else's" (2024)	"Swallow My Tears" (2024)	"Still Gonna Love You" (2025)

Live video
- "Swallow My Tears" on YouTube

"Swallow My Tears" is a song by American singer and songwriter Gwen Stefani from her fifth studio album, Bouquet (2024). Interscope Records released the song on October 25, 2024, as the second single from the project. It was produced by Scott Hendricks and written by Stefani, Jacob Kasher Hindlin, Nick Long, Madison Love, and Henry Walter.

"Swallow My Tears" is a country pop song accompanied by a full live band and was noted by critics for its country music influence. Its lyrics detail a devastating former relationship and how it has affected someone's current ones.

== Background and release ==
Gwen Stefani initiated work on her upcoming fifth studio album in 2020, which was originally to be influenced by her roots in reggae and ska music, and had planned singles "Let Me Reintroduce Myself" (2020) and "Slow Clap" (2021). Stefani took a short hiatus from music in 2023 when she married American singer Blake Shelton and rejoined the cast of the American reality competition television series The Voice for its twenty-fourth season. Her 2023 single "True Babe" marked a musical departure from her early 2020s work, where she felt motivated by various global events to "put [...] something out", and was described as alternative sounding. When Stefani's fifth studio album, Bouquet, was announced in 2024, critics predicted it to serve as her venture into country music instead of the formerly announced reggae project.

Stefani officially revealed Bouquet through her social media accounts on September 18, 2024. The track listing for the album was also unveiled, where "Swallow My Tears" first appeared. It became the third single released prior to Bouquet, following duet "Purple Irises" with husband Shelton and the lead single "Somebody Else's". Interscope Records released the song on October 25, 2024, for download and streaming, with an accompanying audio video appearing on Stefani's YouTube channel the same day. It was produced by Scott Hendricks and written by Stefani, Jacob Kasher Hindlin, Nick Long, Love, and Henry Walter. Its Spotify release was paired with its two previous singles as additional tracks.

== Composition and lyrics ==
"Swallow My Tears" is a country pop song. Several critics noted that "Swallow My Tears" was influenced by country music. The song was referred to as "guitar-led" by NME's Nick Levine, and like the rest of Bouquet, features a full live band. In Stereogum's review by Danielle Chelosky, she said the sound of the song "flirts with [...] country pop", which she contrasted with Stefani's claim that Bouquet was not a country album. Reacting to Stefani explaining that, musically, Bouquet songs were inspired by "childhood car journeys spent listening to classic hits" by musical groups like Chicago, Eagles, and Steely Dan, Levin wrote that "Swallow My Tears" was "designed ofor the open road". According to the Universal Music Publishing Group, "Swallow My Tears" is in common time, with a tempo of 138 beats per minute.

The lyrics reflect on a previous, painful relationship that impact how one views the present, and "sometimes gets taken out on the people we love". Stefani sings of her insecurities ("I got my guard up when there's no war / Don't know what I'm fighting for") and how she finds herself "running [...] but not from you".

== Track listings ==
Digital download/streaming
No.	Title	Length
1.	"Swallow My Tears"	2:53

Streaming – Spotify EP edition
No.	Title	Length
1.	"Swallow My Tears"	2:54
2.	"Somebody Else's"	3:44
3.	"Purple Irises" (with Blake Shelton)	3:40

== Charts ==
Chart performance for "Swallow My Tears"
Chart (2025)	Peak position
US Adult Pop Airplay (Billboard)	22

== Release history ==
Release dates and formats for "Swallow My Tears"
Region	Date	Format(s)	Label	Ref.
Various	October 25, 2024	Digital download; streaming	Interscope	
Italy	November 15, 2024	Radio airplay	Universal	
