= Somebody Else's =

2024 single by Gwen Stefani

Single by Gwen Stefani

from the album Bouquet
- Released: September 20, 2024
- Studio: Smoakstack Studios (Nashville, TN); GS Glam Room (Los Angeles, CA); Warner Recording Studios (Nashville, TN); Pickle Sans Studios (Nashville, TN)
- Genre: Soft rock; new wave; heartland rock
- Length: 3:44
- Label: Interscope
- Songwriters: Gwen Stefani; Fred Ball; Jacob Kasher Hindlin; Nick Long; Madison Love; Jake Torrey; Henry Walter
- Producer: Scott Hendricks

Gwen Stefani singles chronology
"Hello World (Song of the Olympics)" (2024)	"Somebody Else's" (2024)	"Swallow My Tears" (2024)

Music video
- "Somebody Else's" on YouTube

"Somebody Else's" is a song by American singer and songwriter Gwen Stefani from her fifth studio album, Bouquet (2024). Interscope Records released the song on September 20, 2024, as the album's lead single alongside the album's announcement. It was produced by Scott Hendricks and written by Stefani, Fred Ball, Jacob Kasher Hindlin, Nick Long, Madison Love, Jake Torrey, and Henry Walter. Love developed the song after a series of vulnerable writing sessions with Stefani where they discussed their lives.

The soft rock and new wave song was considered by critics to be influenced by the country music output of her husband, singer Blake Shelton. Its lyrics describe moving on from a previous relationship, and were considered by critics to be referencing Stefani's former marriage to British musician Gavin Rossdale. In the United States, the song reached number 11 on Billboard's Adult Pop Airplay chart. To promote the song, Stefani performed "Somebody Else's" on Jimmy Kimmel Live!.

== Background and release ==
In 2020, Gwen Stefani began work on her upcoming fifth studio album, influenced by her roots in reggae and ska music. She released the singles "Let Me Reintroduce Myself" (2020) and "Slow Clap" (2021), and collaborated with Jamaican musicians Sean Paul and Shenseea on "Light My Fire" in 2022. Stefani took a short hiatus from music where she married American singer Blake Shelton and rejoined the cast of the American reality competition television series The Voice for its twenty-fourth season. Her 2023 single "True Babe" was a musical departure from her early 2020s work where she felt motivated by various global events to "put [...] something out". Stefani's fifth studio album, Bouquet, was eventually announced in September 2024, along with news of "Somebody Else's" on its track listing. Because of the album's cover artwork, Bouquet was predicted by critics to be Stefani's venture into country music.

American musician Madison Love began developing "Somebody Else's" following writing sessions where she and Stefani would engage in "a lot of confession and just talk about life and where we're at now, and where we were"; she eventually sent Stefani the start of the song via text, who was unsure of "giv[ing] that any energy" during creative sessions for the album, but ultimately changed her mind after writing more songs for the project and realizing "you needed to see a little bit of the dark to see the light".

"Somebody Else's" was eventually announced as Stefani's upcoming single on September 18, 2024, one week after she had previewed the official audio on her social media accounts. The song was later released on September 20, as the lead single from Bouquet, following the collaboration "Purple Irises" with husband Blake Shelton earlier in the year. It was released digitally for download and streaming, and an accompanying audio video was uploaded to Stefani's YouTube channel the same day. In Italy, it received a release to contemporary hit radio stations beginning September 27. The song was produced by Scott Hendricks and written by Stefani, Fred Ball, Jacob Kasher Hindlin, Nick Long, Love, Jake Torrey, and Henry Walter.

== Composition and lyrics ==
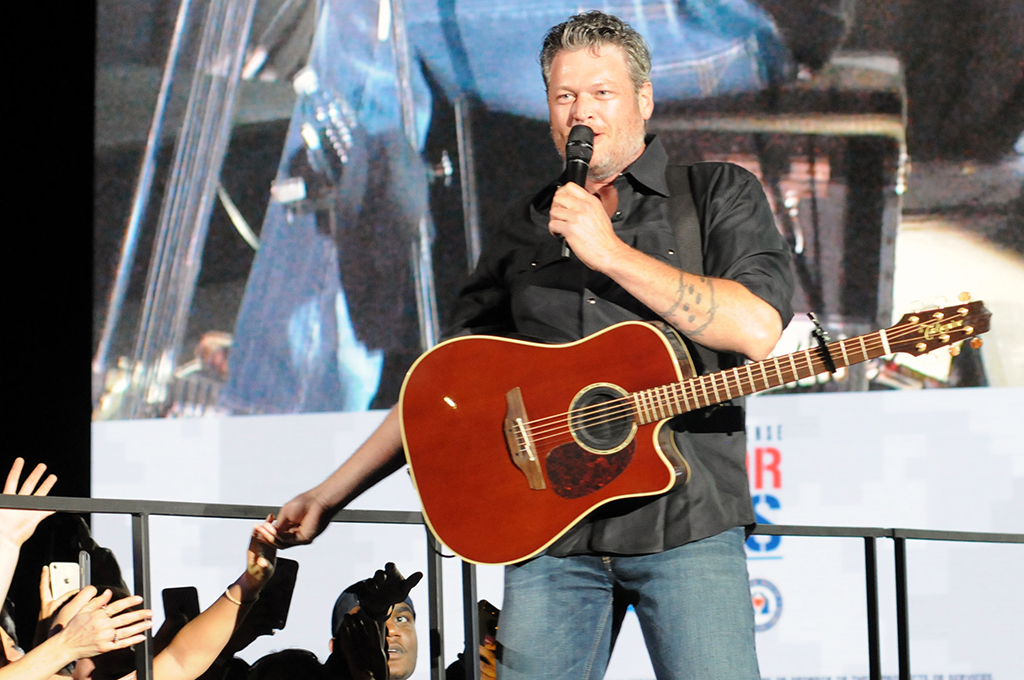
Critics noted the influence of husband Blake Shelton's country music sound on "Somebody Else's".

Critics have classified "Somebody Else's" in several genres within the context of both Stefani's pop and Shelton's country sounds. Joey Nolfi of Entertainment Weekly called the song a hybrid of soft rock and new wave music. Describing it as a heartland rock song, Stereogum's Abby Jones said Stefani was "quite susceptible to the country boom that's going around with pop stars now" given her marriage to Shelton. Jo Vito, for Consequence of Sound, found the song to fit within the "country-influenced sound of Stefani's new era", and Emma Keates from The A.V. Club called it "country-adjacent", acknowledging that Stefani herself said Bouquet was not a country album. The song was recorded with a full live band, like many of the songs on Bouquet. According to the Universal Music Publishing Group, "Somebody Else's" is in common time, with a tempo of 160 beats per minute.

Its lyrics describe letting go of a former relationship ("I don't know what a woman like me / Was doing with a man like you" and "If I could go back in time I would erase you / But I could never go back there") and getting over the ex. Critics believed it referenced Stefani's former relationship with singer Gavin Rossdale, whom she was married to for thirteen years and split from in 2015. Stefani also references her new marriage to Shelton: "I found the real thing, you don't compare / And I don't care." Nolfi considered that "though Stefani doesn't explicitly name anyone in the track's lyrics, fans will naturally connect the song to her highly publicized former relationships"; in the chorus, she sings: "Look at me blossom / You're somebody else's problem." In an interview with Rolling Stone's Daniel Kreps, Stefani admitted it was "interesting that this song rose [to become the new single], because the rest of the record has nothing to do with that subject." Kreps called "Somebody Else's" the perfect segue from Stefani's last pop album, This Is What the Truth Feels Like (2016), to Bouquet, with Truth serving as her divorce record preceding her marriage to Shelton. Forbes' Chris Malone Mendez contrasted the song's lyrics to "Purple Irises", calling the latter a "celebration of love".

== Reception and promotion ==
"Somebody Else's" debuted at number 39 on Billboard's Adult Pop Airplay chart for the issue dated October 5, 2024. Her fifteenth entry, it joins "Purple Irises" as the second song from Bouquet to debut on the chart. "Somebody Else's" reached its peak at number 11 during its twelfth week of charting. It also made an appearance on the Japan Hot Overseas chart by Billboard Japan at number 9. Stefani sang "Somebody Else's" on Jimmy Kimmel Live on October 1, 2024, in its first televised live performance.

== Charts ==
=== Weekly charts ===
Chart performance for "Somebody Else's"
Chart (2024–2025)	Peak position
Croatia International Airplay (HRT)	39
Japan Hot Overseas (Billboard Japan)	9
US Adult Contemporary (Billboard)	24
US Adult Pop Airplay (Billboard)	11

=== Year-end charts ===
Year-end chart performance for "Somebody Else's"
Chart (2025)	Position
US Adult Pop Airplay (Billboard)	31

== Release history ==
Release dates and formats for "Somebody Else's"
Region	Date	Format(s)	Label	Ref.
Various	September 20, 2024	Digital download; streaming	Interscope	
Italy	September 27, 2024	Contemporary hit radio	EMI	
