= Getting Warmer =

Getting Warmer may refer to:

- Hot or cold, a game played by telling seekers they are "getting warmer" to the target
- Getting Warmer (album), a 2000 album by Roger Eno
- "Getting Warmer" (song), a 2016 song by Gwen Stefani
