= True Babe =

Song by Gwen Stefani

Single by Gwen Stefani
- Released: June 23, 2023
- Genre: Pop
- Length: 3:07
- Label: Interscope
- Songwriters: Gwen Stefani; Svante Halldin; Jacob Hazell; Jacob Kasher Hindlin; Luka Kloser; Nicole Rubio
- Producers: Jack & Coke; KThrash

Gwen Stefani singles chronology
"Light My Fire" (2022)	"True Babe" (2023)	"Purple Irises" (2024)

Lyric video
- "True Babe" on YouTube

"True Babe" is a song by American singer Gwen Stefani. It was written by Stefani, Svante Halldin, Jacob Hazell, Jacob Kasher Hindlin, Luka Kloser, and Nicole Rubio, with production handled by KThrash and Jack & Coke, which consists of Halldin and Hazell. The song was distributed as a single on June 23, 2023, her first solo release since "Slow Clap" in 2021. A pop song, "True Babe" contains rock and ska influence, and Stefani felt it recalled older alternative music works. The song's lyrics romantically reference Stefani's husband, singer Blake Shelton, and they detail her enjoyment of their time spent together.

== Background and release ==
Previously, Stefani had released singles "Let Me Reintroduce Myself" (2020) and "Slow Clap" (2021) to promote a solo, upcoming fifth studio album. Following their promotion and Stefani's wedding to singer Blake Shelton, she decided to pause forthcoming musical work. Reflecting in an interview with the Official Charts Company, she spoke: "I've been writing for like three years to try to put something out. And I did put a couple of songs out, but it was during that really weird time when it was like [sic] the US election was going on, it was Christmas, I was on The Voice, and it was also the pandemic. I was the one that was like, 'I don't care, I'm putting something out." Additionally, she stated she was not incredibly satisfied with a lot of her musical output until mid-2023, following collaboration sessions with Swedish musicians Jack & Coke and American songwriter Nicole Rubio, whom she felt she had chemistry with.

"True Babe" was written by Stefani, Rubio, Svante Halldin, Jacob Hazell, Jacob Kasher Hindlin, and Luka Kloser; production was handled by Jack & Coke, which consists of Halldin and Hazell, and KThrash. Rubio had begun writing the song individually, but had Stefani in mind as the singer. Speaking on the songwriting process, Stefani said:

What's weird about it is that the girl that started the song sent me this song pretty much half done. When I listened to it, I was actually on this ranch with all the kids. This guy, JKash, that I'm working with sent it to me and said, 'What do you think of this?' and I went, 'I love this. This sounds like my song!' They told, 'Oh, they wrote it for you.' They came to me with the lyric idea and then I went it with them and finished the song and put in some of my own lyrics to really make it feel more custom."

Stefani first announced "True Babe" a week ahead of its release on June 16, 2023, via her social media accounts. In the days leading up, she had teased photos of herself at the single cover's photoshoot. It serves as her first solo single release in two years. Additionally, Stefani announced a series of promotional concert performances throughout 2023. "True Babe" was then released to digital retailers for download and streaming on June 23, 2023, through Interscope Records. It was accompanied by a lyric video composed of footage from the artwork photoshoot.

== Composition and lyrics ==
"True Babe" is a romantic pop anthem backed by "twangy guitars and thumping drums". Stefani herself considered the song reminiscent of classic alternative music. Kelli Skye Fadroski with The Orange County Register called it "a dreamy pop song" with elements of both rock and ska. Lyrically, the song finds Stefani romanticizing about her partner, Blake Shelton, and the time they spend together. In the song's bridge, she sings "And we're from two different worlds / But you still call me your pretty girl," referring to her home state of California contrasting with Shelton's Oklahoma origins.

In his review of the single, Tom Breihan of Stereogum compared the sound of "True Babe" to a "2010 Max Martin joint".

== Critical reception ==
Breihan acknowledged that Stefani "is deep into the legacy-artist portion of her career [...] but [she] clearly loves pop music" and found the release worthy of being "a potential hit". Fadroski wrote that a lot of Stefani's appeal came from her ability to "wear [...] her heart on her sleeve" and felt "True Babe" was representative of that: "she's a bleeding heart when it comes to expressing her pain, but [Stefani's] also all smiles and swoony vocals when she's totally smitten and head-over-heels for her partner."

== Release history ==
Release dates and formats for "True Babe"
Region	Date	Format(s)	Label	Ref.
Various	June 23, 2023	Digital download; streaming	Interscope	
Italy	July 25, 2023	Contemporary hit radio	Universal Music Group	
