= Bouquet (Gwen Stefani album) =

Studio album by Gwen Stefani
- Released: November 15, 2024
- Studios: Smoakstack Studios (Nashville, Tennessee); GS Glam Room (Los Angeles, California); Warner Recording Studios (Nashville, Tennessee); Pickle Sans Studios (Nashville, Tennessee)
- Genres: Pop rock; soft rock; yacht rock; country pop; country
- Length: 33:05
- Label: Interscope
- Producer: Scott Hendricks

Gwen Stefani chronology
You Make It Feel Like Christmas (2017)	Bouquet (2024)

Singles from Bouquet
- 1. "Somebody Else's" Released: September 20, 2024; 2. "Swallow My Tears" Released: October 25, 2024

Bouquet is the fifth studio album by American singer-songwriter Gwen Stefani. It was released on November 15, 2024, by Interscope Records, and was her first album in almost seven years, the last being 2017's You Make It Feel Like Christmas. Work started on the record in February 2020, when Stefani wrote a song called "Cry Happy", that inspired her to make a new album. Departing from the dance-pop of her previous albums, Bouquet is more reminiscent of 1970s pop rock and the country music her husband, Blake Shelton, is known for.

Stefani began hinting at the album's namesake on September 6, 2024, posting a series of photographs featuring flowers. It was officially announced on September 18, along with its cover art and title, Bouquet, a concept album about flowers. Most of the album was recorded in Nashville, Tennessee, with Scott Hendricks serving as the producer. Two singles preceded the album: "Somebody Else's" on September 20, 2024, and "Swallow My Tears" on October 25, 2024. It also includes the duet "Purple Irises" with husband Blake Shelton, which was released in February 2024.

The album received generally mixed reviews from critics, most praising Stefani's vocal performance as good as ever, but criticizing the songwriting, country-inspired sound and concept album elements. Reviews also took issue with the positive sentiments about marriage in Bouquet, hypocritical of the feminist views expressed in No Doubt's breakthrough single, "Just a Girl" (1995). Commercially, the album reached numbers 80, 94, 95, and 136 respectively on the national charts of Switzerland, Scotland, the United States, and Belgium.

== Conception ==
=== Background ===
Stefani first started work on the project in February 2020, writing a song called "Cry Happy", which was composed of various lyrics she had compiled onto her phone, and cited this event as her inspiration to continue writing new music for a fifth album. The same year she collaborate with her husband Blake Shelton on country pop singles "Nobody but You" and "Happy Anywhere". During initial reports of a new album from Stefani, critics predicted it would serve as her return to pop music, following her lineup of country and holiday music releases in previous years. In a press release, Stefani commented that the album would return to her roots in reggae and ska music. Stefani said she was inspired by world news events, such as the Me Too movement and COVID-19 pandemic, to create uplifting and positive music; she explained: "[Reggae] music was all about unity and anti-racism, and that was in the '70s. Then we (No Doubt) were doing it in the '90s. And now here we are, again, in the same old mess." She released the single "Let Me Reintroduce Myself", musically inspired by her days with No Doubt, in December 2020, and the hip hop-accented "Slow Clap" in March 2021, both of which were expected to appear on Stefani's fifth album.

Stefani began hinting at the album's namesake on September 6, 2024, posting a series of photographs featuring flowers, all prominently. The album was officially announced on September 18, along with its cover art and title, Bouquet, her first release since 2017's You Make It Feel Like Christmas. Stefani said the record has a "flower motif", evident in song titles like "Marigolds", "Empty Vase", and "Late to Bloom", and was inspired by "all the stuff [she] listened to in the station wagon on the way to church" as a child. She created the record following a period of "healing [and] transitioning" that stemmed from the divorce to her ex-husband Gavin Rossdale, part of the subject matter to her 2016 album This Is What the Truth Feels Like. According to Stefani, she was unable to record the project in a consistent schedule due to her parental duties, but rather in "concentrated bursts of creativity". In an interview with NME's Nick Levine, she added: "I don't go to the studio every day and just self-indulge [...] It's like, hey, [the kids] are at school, I got three hours so let's see if I can get down there to write."

=== Album cover ===
Given the album's cover art depicting Stefani in a cowboy hat, critics predicted Bouquet would serve as her first country album. Despite this, she insisted it was not a country album and rather a yacht rock project influenced by 1970s pop radio hits. The artwork from Valheria Rocha, who also worked on the album's art direction, is a photograph of Stefani in a brown tartan suit, holding a singular white flower, sprawled atop a bed. In reaction, Nylon's Dylan Kickham anticipated that "Stefani [would] be riding the cowboy trend like a bronco with at least some of her new music," while People's Rachel DeSantis said "although 'Somebody Else's' appears to have a rock-inspired sound, Stefani went country for the Bouquet album cover."

== Composition ==
Artists who influenced Bouquet

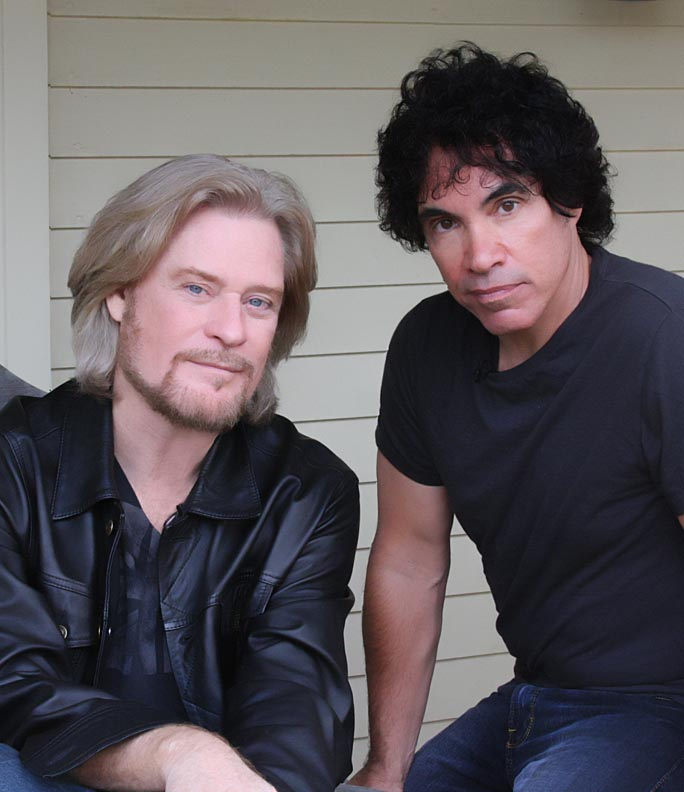
Hall & Oates

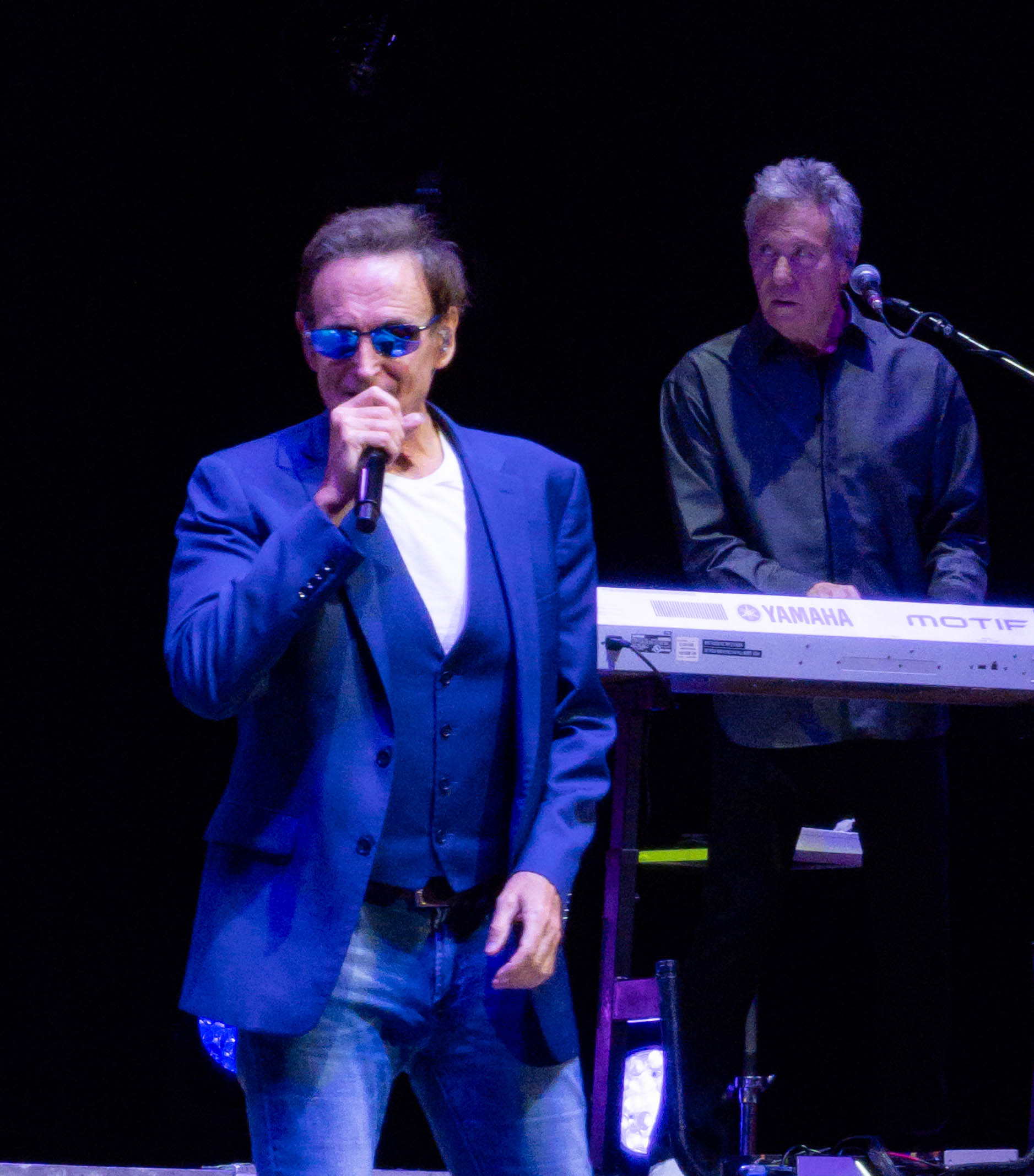
Chicago

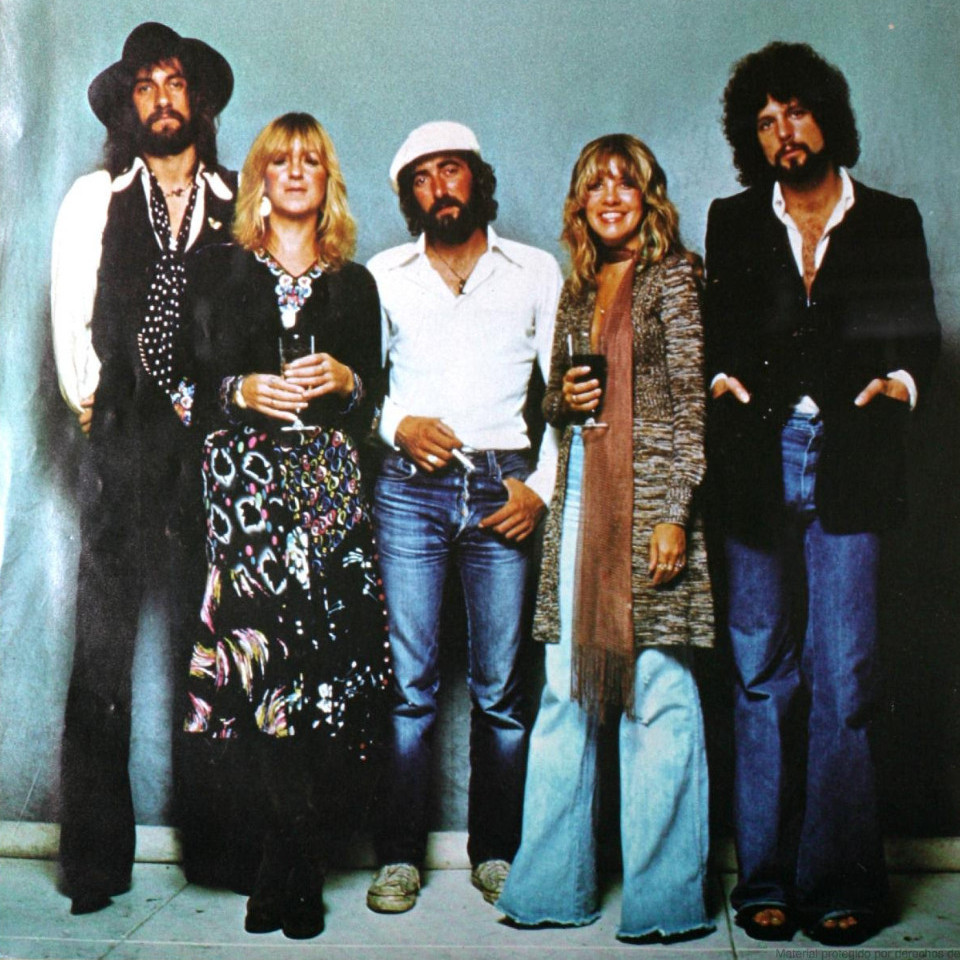
Fleetwood Mac

Stefani described Bouquet as being full of "seventies pop-rock radio gems" with Nashville influence, with critics also describing the album as soft rock, yacht rock, country pop and country. A concept album about flowers, the songs are about a woman who fell on hard times (her marriage with Gavin Rossdale) but was given second chance and, found stability with lots of flowers. The underlying theme of Bouquet is her marriage with Blake Shelton: "We come from such different worlds. Our musical tastes are different, yet we do come together in this one place: We both love '70s soft rock and yacht rock," Stefani told People. "We would always play this game, and we would put on a song and say, 'Do you know this one?' And it would always be these '70s songs." Words and phases like "nostalgia" or "back to her roots" came to Sentinel Colorado's Cristina Jaleru's mind when listening to the album, as she notes influence from Hall & Oates, Chicago, Fleetwood Mac and country music in general. As a result, Bouquet is her most rock-influenced album since her time in No Doubt in the late 1990s and early 2000s, and her most country-influenced album to date.

The opening track, "Somebody Else's", is a heartland rock song, combining Stefani's pop and Shelton's country music. Its lyrics describe letting go of a former relationship ("I don't know what a woman like me was doing with a man like you"). The second and title track, "Bouquet", is a direct ode to Shelton, who she met and fell in love with while they were both coaches on the American talent competition series, "The Voice." At the time, they were both going through divorces to Gavin Rossdale and Miranda Lambert, respectively. The sixth track, "Late to Bloom" combines pop-punk, akin to No Doubt, with country and lyrics of finding later-life love. The closing track, "Purple Irises", is a duet with Shelton, serving as the only collaboration. The love song was originally intended as a solo song, but was lyrically revised to include Shelton. The couple sings about finding love with each other after past heartbreaks. Stefani's lyric "It's not 1999 / But this face is still mine" refers to what she believes was a highlight in her life, and how she has changed since then.

== Promotion ==
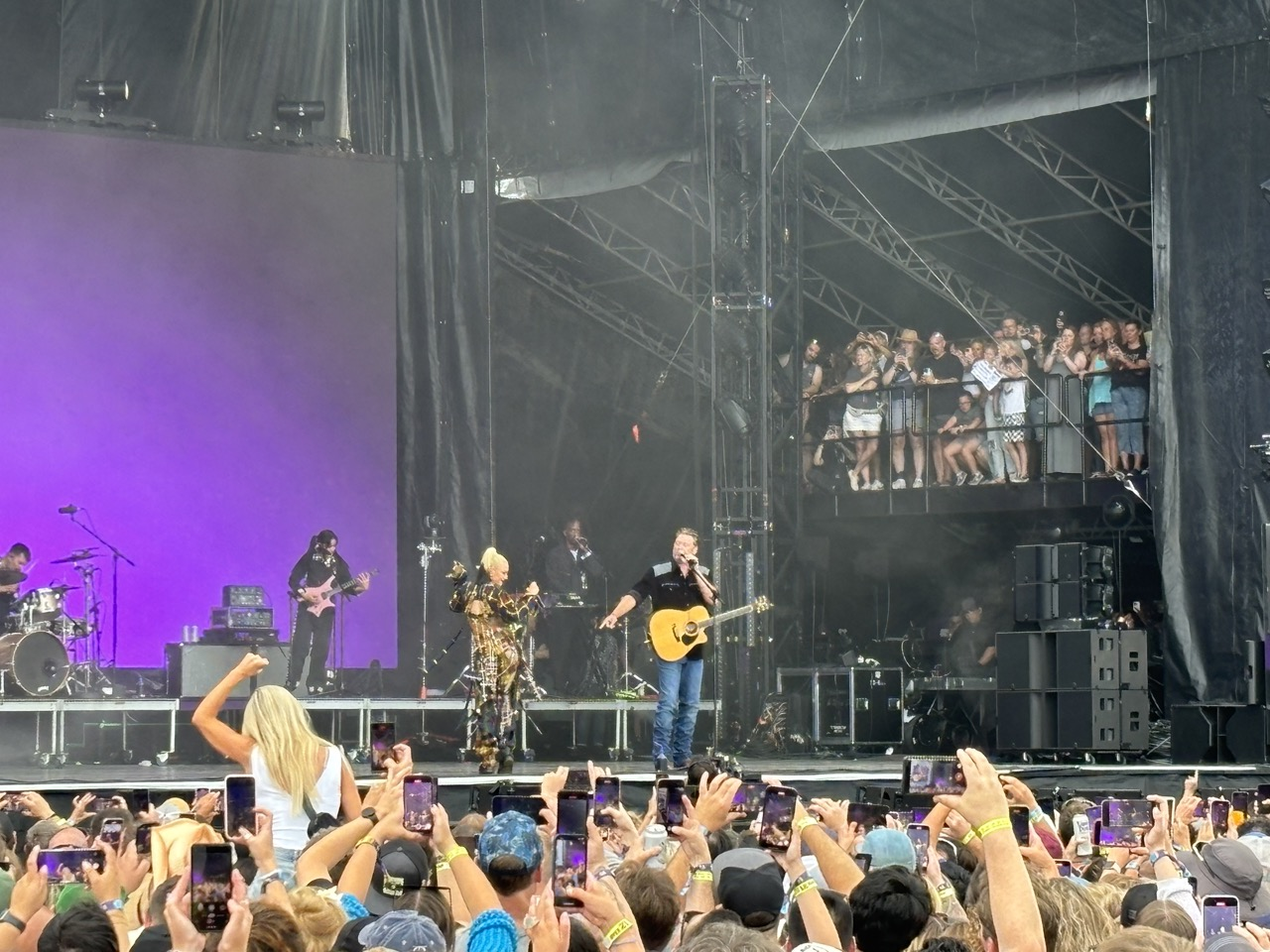
Stefani and Blake Shelton performing "Purple Irises" live in July 2024

In March 2025, Stefani reissued the album as Bouquet Deluxe with the new single "Still Gonna Love You". An acoustic song and collaboration with American singer-songwriter Finneas O'Connell, the lyrics have a message of resilience. "This song is about love," Stefani said in a statement. "A love that can’t be broken, a love that no matter what is always going to be there, and a love that can always bring you back home. Also included were eleven acoustic versions of the album's songs.

=== Singles ===
"Purple Irises", a duet with Shelton, was released months ahead of the album's announcement on February 9, 2024. The song's release came ahead of its live debut at the Super Bowl LVIII TikTok Tailgate Show and just several days after Shelton's digital EP Love Language, which featured the other Stefani collaborations "Nobody but You" (2019) and "Happy Anywhere" (2020), was released. It was accompanied by an airplay release to contemporary hit radio stations in the United States, reaching numbers 15 and 16 on the Adult Contemporary and Adult Pop Airplay charts, respectively. It also reached the top 40 on Billboard's Digital Songs Sales charts in the US and Canada. An accompanying lyric video to "Purple Irises" was released to Stefani's YouTube channel on February 14, 2024.

Following the album's official announcement, "Somebody Else's" was announced as the lead single. It was released digitally on September 20, 2024, alongside an audio visual on YouTube. The song was also serviced to contemporary hit radio, and in the United States it reached number 23 on the Adult Airplay chart. In Japan, "Somebody Else's" appeared on Billboard Japan's Hot Overseas chart at number nine. It had its first televised live performance on Jimmy Kimmel Live! on October 1. "Swallow My Tears" was released as the album's next single on October 25.

== Critical reception ==
Professional ratings
Aggregate scores
Source	Rating
Metacritic	56/100
Review scores
Source	Rating
AllMusic	2.5/5 stars
Clash	8/10
Cryptic Rock	5/5 stars
The Line of Best Fit	6/10
MusicOMH	2/5 stars
Rockol	6.5/10
Rolling Stone	3/5 stars
Slant Magazine	2.5/5 stars
The Times	2/5 stars

Bouquet received generally mixed reviews from contemporary music critics. At Metacritic, which assigns a normalized rating out of 100 to reviews from mainstream publications, the album received an average score of 56, based on eight reviews.

Brendan Sharp of Clash described the album's vibe as "country-inspired," and that Stefani "shows a real vulnerability in her soul-baring lyrics", and founded that "there is a distinct sense of emotional depth at the heart of Bouquet, which feels as though it finds Gwen Stefani at the peak of her songwriting craft". Nina Mende of Cryptic Rock was overwhelmingly positive of Bouquet, which he declared "a great Soft Rock album that will surely please fans all around the world." She added the songs have a county pop-vibe and "come across as genuine and feel quite organic." Maura Johnston of Rolling Stone was less impressed by the album, "an aggressively pleasant collection that continues the ex-SoCal punk’s rebranding as a down-home country gal." She continued that Stefani has not "totally ditched her Doc Martens for cowboy boots," as proof by "Somebody Else's", the "jumpy cut that kicks off the album."

In a less positive review, Sal Cinquemani of Slant Magazine was disappointed the lyrics show a regression of Stefani's views on women from "her breakthrough with No Doubt's neo-feminist anthem 'Just a Girl'" and opined the song arrangements are "middle-of-the-road". Fred Thomas of AllMusic similarly felt the "middle-of-the-road contemporary country of Gwen Stefani's fifth album" is far removed from the "electrifying pop of her earlier solo work, let alone the energy and attitude she brought to No Doubt." Sam Franzini of The Line of Best Fit wrote "Bouquet's botanic metaphors get old quickly." He added, "even when flowers aren't in the picture, she's not at her best," but concludes that "Bouquet is fine as a first country album – there's a relaxed sheen over the whole thing, and she sounds great as ever – it's just disappointing for what we know Stefani to be capable of."

== Track listing ==
All music is composed by Scott Hendricks.

Bouquet track listing
No.	Title	Writer(s)	Length
1.	"Somebody Else's"	Gwen Stefani; Fred Ball; Jacob Kasher Hindlin; Nick Long; Madison Love; Jake Torrey; Henry Walter	3:44
2.	"Bouquet"	Stefani; Ball; Mark Landon; Long; Love; Walter	3:25
3.	"Pretty"	Stefani; Long; Love; Walter	3:13
4.	"Empty Vase"	Stefani; Long; Love; Walter	2:58
5.	"Marigolds"	Stefani; Svante Halldin; Jakob Hazell; Niko Rubio	2:42
6.	"Late to Bloom"	Stefani; Landon; Long; Love; Walter	3:26
7.	"Swallow My Tears"	Stefani; Hindlin; Long; Love; Walter	2:54
8.	"Reminders"	Stefani; Ilsey Juber; Stephen McGregor	3:18
9.	"All Your Fault"	Diane Warren	3:45
10.	"Purple Irises" (with Blake Shelton)	Stefani; Halldin; Hazell; Rubio	3:40
Total length:			33:05

Deluxe edition bonus tracks
No.	Title	Writer(s)	Length
11.	"Still Gonna Love You"	Stefani; Finneas O'Connell	3:30
12.	"Still Gonna Love You" (acoustic)		3:28
13.	"Somebody Else's" (acoustic)		3:42
14.	"Bouquet" (acoustic)		3:23
15.	"Pretty" (acoustic)		3:11
16.	"Empty Vase" (acoustic)		2:53
17.	"Marigolds" (acoustic)		2:39
18.	"Late to Bloom" (acoustic)		3:26
19.	"Swallow My Tears" (acoustic)		2:53
20.	"Reminders" (acoustic)		3:18
21.	"All Your Fault" (acoustic)		3:46
22.	"Purple Irises" (with Blake Shelton) (acoustic)		3:38
Total length:			72:52

== Personnel ==
Musicians

- Gwen Stefani – vocals
- Sam Bergeson – electric guitar, programming, synthesizer (all tracks); slide guitar (tracks 1–3, 7–10), background vocals (1, 2, 10), keyboards (2, 3, 7, 9), vocals (4–6, 8, 9), percussion (9)
- Jessi Alexander – background vocals
- Perry Coleman – background vocals
- Tony Lucido – bass
- Fred Eltringham – drums
- Todd Lombardo – electric guitar (tracks 1, 10), acoustic guitar (2–9)
- Tom Bukovac – electric guitar
- Gordon Mote – Rhodes (tracks 1, 7, 10), piano (2–9), synthesizer (2–5, 7), organ (5, 6, 8, 9)
- Jerry McPherson – electric guitar (track 2)

Technical

- Scott Hendricks – production, additional engineering
- Zack Zinck – engineering
- Zachary Acosta – additional engineering
- Terry Watson – additional engineering (tracks 1–5, 7)
- Sam Bergeson – additional engineering (tracks 1–4, 7–10)
- Brendon Hapgood – additional engineering (tracks 1, 5, 6, 8, 10)
- Samuel Hayes – additional engineering (tracks 2–9)
- Jeff Juliano – mixing
- Nate Juliano – mixing assistance
- Andrew Mendelson – mastering
- Adam Battershell – mastering assistance
- Andrew Darby – mastering assistance
- Joey Salit – mastering assistance
- Luke Armentrout – mastering assistance
- Taylor Chadwick – mastering assistance
- Shannon Finnegan – production coordination

== Charts ==
Chart performance for Bouquet
Chart (2024)	Peak position
Belgian Albums (Ultratop Wallonia)	136
French Physical Albums (SNEP)	86
Scottish Albums (Official Charts)	94
Swiss Albums (Schweizer Hitparade)	80
UK Album Sales (OCC)	44
US Billboard 200	95

== Release history ==
Bouquet release history
Region	Date	Format(s)	Edition	Label	Ref.
Various	November 15, 2024	Digital download; streaming	Standard	Interscope	
Various	November 15, 2024	CD; LP	Standard	Interscope	
Various	March 14, 2025	Digital download; streaming	Deluxe	Interscope	
