= Shake the Snow Globe (song) =

2025 single by Gwen Stefani

Single by Gwen Stefani

from the album You Make It Feel Like Christmas
- Released: November 14, 2025
- Genre: Christmas
- Length: 2:53
- Label: Interscope
- Songwriters: Gwen Stefani; Spencer Stewart; Madison Love; Sean Douglas
- Producer: Stewart

Gwen Stefani singles chronology
"Still Gonna Love You" (2025)	"Shake the Snow Globe" (2025)

Music video
- "Shake the Snow Globe" on YouTube

"Shake the Snow Globe" is a song by American singer Gwen Stefani, released on November 5, 2025 exclusively on Amazon Music. It is the lead single from the 2025 reissued edition of her fourth studio album, You Make It Feel Like Christmas (2017), and appears on the soundtrack of the 2025 Christmas comedy film Oh. What. Fun. Stefani wrote the song with its producer Spencer Stewart, Madison Love and Sean Douglas.

== Background ==
With respect to composing the song, Gwen Stefani stated that it was the first time she had ever been asked to write a song for a specific moment in a film. She felt "nervous, excited, and inspired to take on the challenge of creating a Christmas song that feels up tempo, nostalgic and reflects the sentiment of the movie, Oh. What. Fun." Michael Showalter, the film's director, considered Gwen Stefani and her band No Doubt important figures in music from his generation and is a lifelong fan of her. He also called "Shake the Snow Globe" the "most incredibly infectious and groovy tune" on the soundtrack.

== Composition and critical reception ==
The song is composed of a bouncy rhythm and arrangement of horns. The lyrics contain direct references to lines and moments from Oh. What. Fun. Fabio Magnocavallo of Euphoria Magazine described the song as a "jolly, upbeat number meant for Christmas parties. It's playful, catchy, and has the special ingredient all festive originals need: an inescapable and infectious chorus."

== Music video ==
The music video was released alongside the single. A "candy-colored" visual, it sees Stefani being joined by a live band, dancing nutcrackers and ballerinas.

== Live performances ==
Gwen Stefani performed the song on Today and The Tonight Show Starring Jimmy Fallon.

== Charts ==
Chart performance for "Shake the Snow Globe"
Chart (2025)	Peak position
Canada Hot 100 (Billboard)	63
Global 200 (Billboard)	86
UK Singles (Official Charts)	16
US Billboard Hot 100	55
US Adult Contemporary (Billboard)	7
US Holiday 100 (Billboard)	64
