= What U Workin' With? =

Song by Gwen Stefani and Justin Timberlake

from the album Trolls: Original Movie Soundtrack
- Released: September 23, 2016
- Studio: MXM Studios (Stockholm, Sweden); Wolf Cousins Studios (Stockholm, Sweden)
- Genre: Hip-hop; dance
- Length: 3:12
- Label: Villa 40; RCA
- Songwriters: Justin Timberlake; Max Martin; Savan Kotecha; Peter Svensson; Ilya Salmanzadeh
- Producers: Justin Timberlake; Max Martin; Ilya Salmanzadeh

"What U Workin' With?" is a song by American singers Gwen Stefani and Justin Timberlake from the official soundtrack to the 2016 film Trolls. Timberlake co-wrote and co-produced the track with Max Martin and Ilya Salmanzadeh, with additional writing from Savan Kotecha and Peter Svensson. The song was first announced on August 22, 2016, with Stefani's appearance being a secret. An urban and dance song, the lyrics talk about having a good time and standing out amongst a crowd.

"What U Workin' With?" was favorably reviewed by several contemporary music critics; although many found Stefani's contribution unexpected, they agreed that her role was enjoyable. Commercially, it peaked at number eight on Billboard's Kid Digital Song Sales component chart, where it lasted for three non-consecutive weeks.

== Background and release ==
The track listing for Trolls was released by Justin Timberlake on Instagram on August 22, 2016, where he unveiled the names of thirteen tracks on the album. Additionally, "What U Workin' With?" was first revealed, although Gwen Stefani's role on the track had remained a secret. In addition, he claimed that the record was "almost ready" and that preorders would be announced in the near future. The release of the soundtrack was fronted by Timberlake's "Can't Stop the Feeling!", which was made available as a digital download on May 6, 2016, while the album in its entirety was released on September 23 of the same year. "What U Workin' With?" was written by Timberlake, Max Martin, Ilya Salmanzadeh, Savan Kotecha, and Peter Svensson, while the production was handled by the former three. On December 30, 2016, Stefani hosted a "dance party" at her home before uploading videos of herself and boyfriend Blake Shelton dancing along to "What You Workin' With?" during the event to her Snapchat and Musical.ly accounts.

== Composition and recording ==
An urban and dance song, it marks Stefani and Timberlake's first collaboration since the 2001 charity single "What's Going On". During the recording process, Timberlake spoke cheerfully of the sessions and stated: "I have always envisioned bringing the two worlds of film and music together for one epic event [and] couldn't be more excited that they will collide in DreamWork's Trolls." Regarding the music itself, Stefani sings about standing out and remaining original as her verses lead up to the chorus; she leads, "This is the moment when everybody's in the light / So what you working with?".

== Reception ==
Christina Lee from Idolator called it "as assertive" as Stefani's "Hollaback Girl" (2005), which she considered a good thing, while Kayleigh Hughes from Bustle described it as "super cool". Additionally, Allison Bowsher from Much claimed that the artists, including Stefani and Timberlake, within the soundtrack created "awesome music". Jonathan Hamard from Aficia compared the track to Stefani's 2004 song "Rich Girl" and the material on her third studio album, This Is What the Truth Feels Like (2016). He felt her role in Trolls was a good move and claimed that Stefani's verses came off as cool and unpretentious. Similarly, Nadia N. from Virgin Radio saw the release as unexpected but praised the dancing qualities of the track.

"What U Workin' With?" debuted on Billboard's Kid Digital Song Sales component chart on October 15, 2016, at number eight; it entered simultaneously with the duo's other collaboration, "Hair Up", which debuted at number 14. It dropped off the following week, but re-entered during the week of November 26, 2016, where it was ranked at number ten. It spent a total of three weeks on the Kid Digital Songs chart, leaving at number fifteen on December 3, 2016.

== Charts ==
Chart performance
Chart (2016)	Peak position
US Kid Digital Song Sales (Billboard)	8
