= Purple Irises =

2024 single by Gwen Stefani and Blake Shelton

Single by Gwen Stefani and Blake Shelton
- Released: February 9, 2024
- Studio: Smoakstack Studios (Nashville, TN); Warner Recording Studios (Nashville, TN); Pickle Sans Studios (Nashville, TN)
- Genre: Country pop
- Length: 3:41
- Label: Warner
- Songwriters: Gwen Stefani; Svante Halldin; Jakob Hazell; Niko Rubio
- Producer: Scott Hendricks

Gwen Stefani singles chronology
"True Babe" (2023)	"Purple Irises" (2024)	"Hello World (Song of the Olympics)" (2024)

Blake Shelton singles chronology
"No Body" (2022)	"Purple Irises" (2024)	"Pour Me a Drink" (2024)

Live video
- "Purple Irises" on YouTube

"Purple Irises" is a song by American singers Gwen Stefani and Blake Shelton. It was produced by Scott Hendricks and written by Stefani, Svante Halldin, Jakob Hazell, and Niko Rubio. The song was released on February 9, 2024, through Warner Records and is included on Stefani's fifth studio album, Bouquet (2024). It is a country pop love song that finds the couple reminiscing about past heartbreaks that led to their eventual relationship. Some of the song's lyrics reference the artists' careers. Commercially, it reached the digital component charts in the United States and Canada, and several Billboard airplay charts in the former country.

== Background and release ==
"Purple Irises" is another collaboration from singers and married couple Gwen Stefani and Blake Shelton, who had most recently released a cover of The Judds' "Love Is Alive" in 2023. It was released on February 9, 2024, for digital consumption. The digital release occurred ahead of the song's live debut at the Super Bowl LVIII TikTok Tailgate Show and just several days after Shelton's digital EP Love Language, which featured the other Stefani collaborations "Nobody but You" (2019) and "Happy Anywhere" (2020).

== Composition and lyrics ==
"Purple Irises" is a country pop ballad love song. The Tennessean's Marcus K. Dowling referred to it as a "danceable pop track". The song was produced by Scott Hendricks and written by Stefani, Svante Halldin, Jakob Hazell, and Niko Rubio. Originally developed for Stefani, a few lyrical rewrites were made upon Shelton's joining. He commented, "She knew there was something different about [the song] and asked me to come in and sing with her. My longtime producer [Hendricks] produced it, and Gwen's been wanting to work with him for a long time now, and it's turned into this really cool and different song that can live anywhere."

Lyrically, the song discusses Stefani and Shelton's love in the aftermath of being heartbroken from previous relationships. The line "Wonder why you took a risk / On a broken heart you cannot fix?" references how the two met while starring on The Voice together, while "It's not 1999 / But this face is still mine" refers back to Stefani in what she called "a highlight of [her] career", as suggested by one of the songwriters, to which she replied "But this face is still mine".

== Critical reception ==
Nolan Feeney from Nylon wrote that Stefani "sings about aging, insecurity, and the ups and downs of marriage with the kind of striking vulnerability that reminds listeners why the pop-rock icon's work has endured for so long."

== Chart performance ==
"Purple Irises" did not chart on the Billboard Hot 100 or Canadian Hot 100 in the United States and Canada, respectively, but did reach the associated digital component charts. The song debuted at number 15 on the US Digital Song Sales during the week of February 24, 2024, marking the duo's sixth appearance on the chart together. In Canada, it reached number 19. That same week, the song appeared on the Hot Country Songs chart at number 40, Stefani and Shelton's fourth charting joint effort. Following its impact on adult contemporary radio, it peaked at number 15 on the US Adult Contemporary chart. The single became Stefani's third-highest-peaking release, after "The Sweet Escape" with Akon reaching number 3 in 2007, and "You Make It Feel Like Christmas" with Shelton reaching number 9 in 2017. It also charted for fourteen weeks on Billboard's Adult Pop Airplay chart, where it peaked at number 16, serving as Stefani's first appearance on the chart since "Misery" in 2016 and Shelton's second overall, after "Just a Fool" with Christina Aguilera in 2013.

== Charts ==
=== Weekly charts ===
Weekly chart performance for "Purple Irises"
Chart (2024)	Peak position
Canada Digital Song Sales (Billboard)	19
US Adult Contemporary (Billboard)	15
US Adult Pop Airplay (Billboard)	16
US Country Airplay (Billboard)	34
US Digital Song Sales (Billboard)	15
US Hot Country Songs (Billboard)	40

=== Year-end charts ===
2024 year-end chart performance for "Purple Irises"
Chart (2024)	Position
US Adult Contemporary (Billboard)	26
