= Slow Clap (song) =

Song by Gwen Stefani

Single by Gwen Stefani
- Released: March 11, 2021
- Genre: Reggae pop
- Length: 2:30
- Label: Interscope
- Songwriters: Gwen Stefani; Luke Niccoli; Ross Golan
- Producer: Luke Niccoli

Gwen Stefani singles chronology
"Let Me Reintroduce Myself" (2020)	"Slow Clap" (2021)	"Light My Fire" (2022)

Music video
- "Slow Clap" on YouTube

"Slow Clap" is a song by American singer Gwen Stefani. She wrote the song with Ross Golan and the song's sole producer, Luke Niccoli. It was released on March 11, 2021, by Interscope Records, originally as the intended second single from her fifth studio album. It also debuted alongside a line of Amazon-exclusive merchandise. The song is a reggae and pop track that was compared to Stefani's "Hollaback Girl" and work with No Doubt. "Slow Clap" originated as an emotional love song, but transitioned into a positive one following recommendations from Niccoli and Golan. The song's lyrics speak of resilience and its title was inspired by films that portray an underdog.

A version of "Slow Clap" featuring American rapper Saweetie was released on April 9, 2021. Stefani expressed interest in working with Saweetie after viewing her Instagram profile, which resulted in the scheduling of their collaboration the next day. Its accompanying music video was directed by Sophie Muller, and filmed inside of a high school gymnasium and locker rooms.

== Background and release ==
In late 2020, Gwen Stefani revealed that she had been writing songs and wanted to release something "really soon". In December, she released the song "Let Me Reintroduce Myself" as the lead single for her unreleased fifth studio album. She confirmed the album in January 2021, in an interview with Today, and said its release would occur "probably soon". Stefani also expressed excitement at just putting out new singles: "What's so great about now is you can put music out and write at the same time [...] you can share it faster and not worry about it as much. It's fun." On March 8, she published a series of images onto her social media accounts, featuring objects such as an alarm clock reading "5:44" and a cassette tape with the title "Slow Clap". She confirmed "Slow Clap" as the name of her next single, the following day. The single cover art was simultaneously unveiled, displaying Stefani in a "bedazzled and diamond-fringed" cowgirl-inspired outfit. She is surrounded by various Easter eggs, such as a basketball, bicycle, and an ice cream cone.

Using the same creative team behind "Let Me Reintroduce Myself", "Slow Clap" was written by Stefani, Ross Golan, and the song's sole producer, Luke Niccoli. During an interview with Apple Music 1's Zane Lowe, Stefani stated that she initially imagined writing a "sad love song", but was met with hesitation from both Niccoli and Golan. They convinced her to write a song about resilience and reflection, which became "Slow Clap". She continued:

It's kind of this place of, you always go through different phases where you question yourself [...] I feel like it's that thing that happens to us throughout life. It starts in high school where you feel like you don't fit in, and then sometimes your weirdness actually is what makes you so special, and so the song is kind of about that. It's also about wanting to just, even though I know I've had my 15 minutes of my time, wanting to kind of double dip and just get a little bit more.

"Slow Clap" was released to digital retailers for download and streaming on March 11, 2021, through Interscope Records. It debuted alongside Stefani's exclusive merchandise line through Amazon, and a promotional audio clip of the song on her YouTube channel. Stefani promoted the song through live performances on Jimmy Kimmel Live! on March 15, 2021 as well as Good Morning America on March 31, 2021. The music video for "Slow Clap" was released through Gwen Stefani's YouTube channel on April 27, 2021.

== Composition and lyrics ==
Because of Stefani's cowgirl outfit in the cover art, some fans believed "Slow Clap" would be a country music release. However, the song was described as a high energy, ska-tinged reggae and pop track by music critics. Its instrumentation consists of strings and a "snappy hip hop bass". Niccoli is credited as the song's bassist, guitarist and keyboardist, while Golan provides handclaps and is a background vocalist. Ryan Leas from Stereogum claimed that upon the song's first listen, Stefani sounds more like English singer Charli XCX. Some critics compared the sound to Stefani's work with No Doubt. Feeling the song was reminiscent to her older titles, Kelli Skye Fadroski of Orange County Register described "Slow Clap" as "Rock Steady meets 'Hollaback Girl'". Entertainment Weekly's Joey Nolfi furthered the Rock Steady comparison, saying "Slow Clap" uses the same "echoey melody" of its title track (2001).

In "Slow Clap", Stefani sings about her personal achievements, professionally, and not being an underdog, referencing the tale of David and Goliath. The song's initial inspiration stemmed from a "hustle meeting" she had with Interscope, that left her feeling vulnerable. The title was inspired by films of the 1980s, specifically ones where the protagonist gets "clapped back to life". In a later interview, Stefani acknowledged the 1986 film Lucas, specifically. Fadroski summarized the song's lyrics as "a pep talk delivered with confidence", while Rachael Dowd from Alternative Press described them as "about snapping back into reality after going through a lull point in life". The refrain is playful and fun, with Stefani chanting: "Clap, clap / Walk into the room like a boss / Slow clap / Putting on a little extra sauce."

== Critical reception ==
Sam Damshenas from Gay Times lauded the single, writing that Stefani is "at her absolute best". Nolfi enjoyed "Slow Clap", calling it an earworm that Stefani deserves "a round of applause for". Leas felt the song was "infectious enough [to] get stuck in your head" after a few listens, and that it recalled Stefani's career in the 1990s when she "laid [the] groundwork" for other artists. Fabio Magnocavallo from Euphoria felt the song's lyrics were deeper than they initially come across, and appreciated Stefani for "taking her sound wherever the hell she wants it to go" in an industry dominated by younger artists. In his list of "Songs We'll Leave Behind in 2021", Amit Vaidya from Rolling Stone India featured "Slow Clap" and argued that it "has to be one of the most ridiculous attempts at the artist trying to reclaim her place on the Top 40 again".

== Version with Saweetie ==
"Slow Clap"

Single by Gwen Stefani and Saweetie
- Released: April 9, 2021
- Length: 3:11
- Label: Interscope
- Songwriters: Gwen Stefani; Luke Niccoli; Ross Golan; Diamonté Harper; Kameron Glasper; Tayla Parx
- Producer: Luke Niccoli

Saweetie singles chronology
"Best Friend" (2021)	"Slow Clap" (2021)	"Confetti" (2021)

Music video
- "Slow Clap" (feat. Saweetie) on YouTube

=== Development ===
A version of "Slow Clap" featuring American rapper Saweetie was released on April 9, 2021, through Interscope Records as the album's second single. The collaboration was first announced five days prior, via Stefani's social media accounts. Saweetie, along with Kameron Glasper and Tayla Parx receive additional credits as songwriters to "Slow Clap". Stefani enlisted Saweetie for a guest feature after watching the rapper dance to her 2005 single "Luxurious" in an Instagram post. The collaboration was scheduled within one day, resulting in Saweetie taking to her Instagram account again, writing: "I'm going in to work with someone, here's a clue: she's iconic." Saweetie's verse was written within just one day, and then added to the song. Following the guest addition, Stefani chose to create a second music video for "Slow Clap", as the filming for the original one was already underway.

In Saweetie's verse, she recalls her adolescence by namedropping candies Laffy Taffy and Bubblicious, and also provides a shoutout to Stefani's singles "Hollaback Girl" and "Rich Girl" (2004): "I ain't no Hollaback bitch / Now I got it, I ain't gotta act rich." Variety's Ellise Shafer felt Saweetie rapped with "unapologetic confidence" in her verse.

=== Critical reception ===
Complex's Jordan Rose enjoyed the collaboration: "Gwen Stefani proves how elite of a collaborator she is by calling in Saweetie to add a whole new flavor to the song [...] The meshing of her patented pop vocals with Saweetie's rap rhythms makes for a unique song." Kaido Strange from mxdwn.com wrote that Saweetie's appearance "brings the song alive".

=== Music video ===
Alongside the announcement of a new version of "Slow Clap", Stefani confirmed that a music video release would occur as well; she tweeted "[You] didn't think we'd leave [you] without a music video, did [you]?!" It was directed by Sophie Muller, a longtime collaborator of Stefani and No Doubt, and released on April 9, 2021. Its release was preceded by a ten-second trailer, which was posted to YouTube the day prior.

The music video begins with Stefani and Saweetie inside of a high school gymnasium and locker room. They are shown wearing jerseys and athletic uniforms, with the latter artist also sporting hot pink hair and a pair of star-spangled booty shorts. Both artists, occasionally seated in the audience, interact with groups of students skipping rope and dribbling basketballs. It ends with both artists dressed in prom attire, with Stefani and Saweetie wearing frilly pink and blue dresses, respectively, and jumping on a trampoline. Some background dancers are shown wearing jeans and Juicy Couture.

Justin Curto from Vulture wrote that the video gave off "high school vibes" which were reminiscent of the "Hollaback Girl" music video. According to Newsweek's Jon Jackson, Twitter users criticized the video as cultural appropriation because of Stefani's "hip hop-inspired look" and "the visual presentation of her amid people of color".

== Track listings ==
Digital download/streaming
No.	Title	Length
1.	"Slow Clap"	2:30

Digital download/streaming – with Saweetie
No.	Title	Length
1.	"Slow Clap" (with Saweetie)	3:11

== Credits and personnel ==
Credits adapted from Tidal.

- Gwen Stefani – composer, lyricist, vocalist
- Luke Niccoli – composer, lyricist, bass, guitar, keyboards
- Ross Golan – composer, lyricist, background vocalist, clapping
- Karl Wingate – recording engineer, studio personnel
- Chris Gehringer – mastering engineer, studio personnel
- Tony Maserati – mixer, studio personnel

== Release history ==
Release dates and formats for "Slow Clap"
Region	Date	Format(s)	Version	Label	Ref.
Various	March 11, 2021	Digital download; streaming	Original	Interscope	
Various	April 9, 2021	Digital download; streaming	with Saweetie	Interscope	
Italy	June 4, 2021	Contemporary hit radio	with Saweetie	Universal	
Italy	June 4, 2021	Contemporary hit radio	Original	Universal	
