= Let Me Reintroduce Myself =

Single by Gwen Stefani
- Released: December 7, 2020
- Recorded: August 2020
- Studio: The Village (Los Angeles)
- Genre: Reggae; ska; pop
- Length: 3:11
- Label: Interscope
- Songwriters: Gwen Stefani; Luke Niccoli; Ross Golan
- Producer: Luke Niccoli

Gwen Stefani singles chronology
"Here This Christmas" (2020)	"Let Me Reintroduce Myself" (2020)	"Slow Clap" (2021)

Music video
- "Let Me Reintroduce Myself" on YouTube

"Let Me Reintroduce Myself" is a song by American singer and songwriter Gwen Stefani. Stefani wrote the song with Ross Golan and the sole producer, Luke Niccoli. It was released on December 7, 2020, by Interscope Records as the intended lead single to her fifth studio album, which was ultimately unreleased. The song's development was unexpected, as Stefani doubted herself and questioned if her fans would seek new music. Fellow No Doubt member Gabrial McNair and Gwen's brother Eric Stefani, amongst other performers, provide instrumentation. A departure from Gwen Stefani's previous country and holiday music releases, "Let Me Reintroduce Myself" is an energetic Latin-sounding reggae, ska, and pop track inspired by her early work with No Doubt. The upbeat and playful song refers to Stefani's career in the music industry, per the suggestion of Golan. Most critics gave the song positive reviews, calling it catchy and making favorable comparisons to No Doubt's releases.

Commercially, "Let Me Reintroduce Myself" entered several of the airplay and digital component charts in both North America and Europe. An accompanying music video was directed by Philip Andelman and released on January 1, 2021. It features a group of Stefani clones dressed in outfits from her older music videos, upstaging the current Stefani at a video shoot. She performed the song on The Voice the same day of the digital release, followed by performances on The Tonight Show Starring Jimmy Fallon and at the Global Citizen Prize awards show.

== Background and release ==
On October 20, 2020, Gwen Stefani revealed that she had been writing songs and was eager to release new music. She teased that something new would be coming "really soon", her first release since You Make It Feel Like Christmas in 2017. According to Stefani, creating music for a new studio album was completely unexpected and not in her plans. She admitted that she rarely "seek[s] new music" from her favorite artists, and initially doubted if her fans would do the same. Via her social media accounts, Stefani first announced "Let Me Reintroduce Myself" on December 4, 2020. She wrote and composed the song with Luke Niccoli and Ross Golan, the latter of whom she first met virtually during a Zoom conference. It was written and recorded in late August 2020 at the Village recording studios in Los Angeles. Stefani found herself inspired to write new music following the events of the COVID-19 pandemic and her time spent as a judge on The Voice. Regarding her decision to record a new reggae song, Stefani explained: "[Reggae] music was all about unity and anti-racism, and that was in the '70s. Then we were doing it in the '90s. And now here we are, again, in the same old mess." She felt inspired by the ongoing events of 2020 and the aftereffects of the Me Too movement to create upbeat and positive music. Stefani considered "Let Me Reintroduce Myself" to be fun and lighthearted, and described it her "a way of saying I’m back with new music".

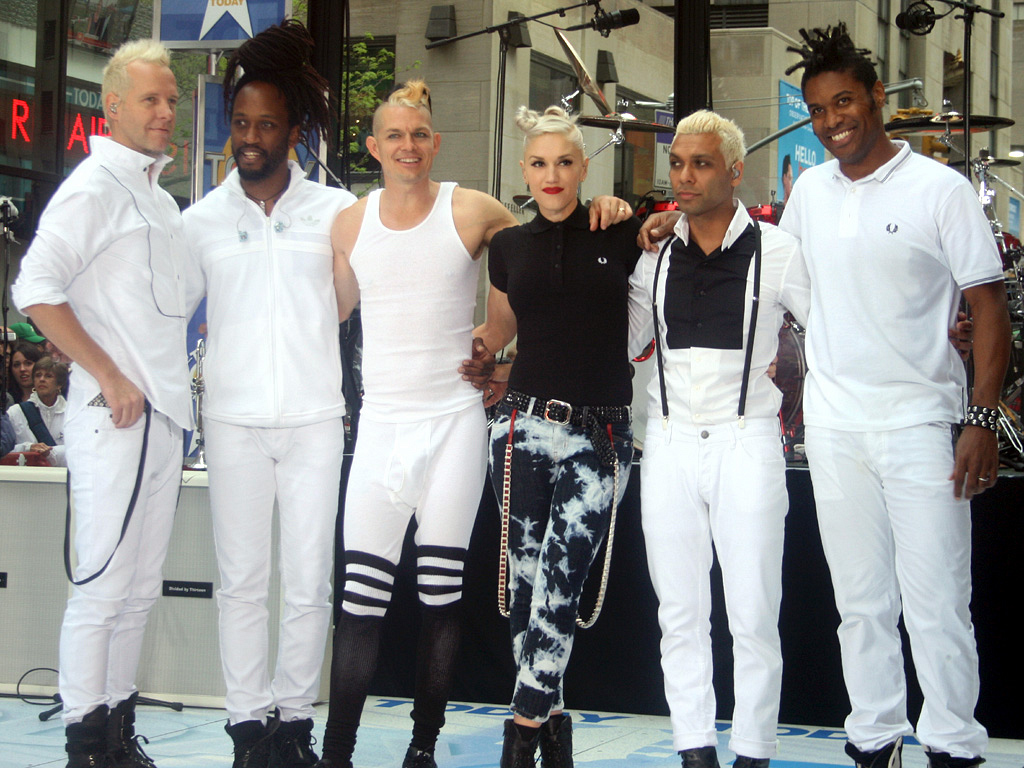
Stefani, pictured third from the right, performing as part of No Doubt in 2009; "Let Me Reintroduce Myself" was compared to her early work with the group.

On December 4, 2020, Stefani revealed the official cover artwork for "Let Me Reintroduce Myself" on her social media accounts. The artwork features two versions of Stefani, with one of them copying her outfit from the music video to No Doubt's single "Just a Girl" (1995). The other Stefani is dressed in "a sexy black bra, shredded jean shorts, fishnets, tall black boots and a series of straps all over herself". The jewelry worn by Stefani in the photograph, including a necklace, belt, and harness, was made by Azerbaijan designer Saida Mouradova, founder of Object & Dawn. Rania Aniftos from Billboard reacted to the artwork unveiling, writing: "Gwen Stefani is back!" Furthermore, she compared her appearance in the cover to her look during "Hollaback Girl" (2005) and described it as "an ageless Stefani in a characteristically edgy outfit". Heran Mamo from the same publication agreed, opining that Stefani juxtaposed her "Just a Girl" and "Hollaback Girl" styles. Lauren Ramesbottom from The Loop also drew a comparison to her "Hollaback Girl" look, calling it a tribute to her past mixed with her "punk-modern style of the present".

"Let Me Reintroduce Myself" was released for digital download and streaming in various countries on December 7, 2020, through Interscope Records. It serves as her first non-festive single release since "Misery", a single from her third studio album, This Is What the Truth Feels Like (2016). A press release for "Let Me Reintroduce Myself" revealed that it would eventually appear on Stefani's upcoming fifth studio album. James Rettig from Stereogum pointed out that the song premiered just two months after the announcement of her engagement to American singer Blake Shelton. Stefani also revealed that Shelton was the one who selected "Let Me Reintroduce Myself" as her next single. The song was accompanied by the release of a lyric video that was uploaded to Stefani's YouTube channel on December 7, 2020. The video features Stefani in various outfits "channel[ing] several of her old eras". Additionally, a variety of "Let Me Reintroduce Myself"-themed merchandise, consisting of hooded sweatshirts, T-shirts, and sweatpants, became available for purchase on Stefani's official online store. On December 9, 2020, it was announced that the Universal Music Group would be releasing the song to contemporary hit radio stations in Italy beginning December 11 of the same year.

== Composition and lyrics ==
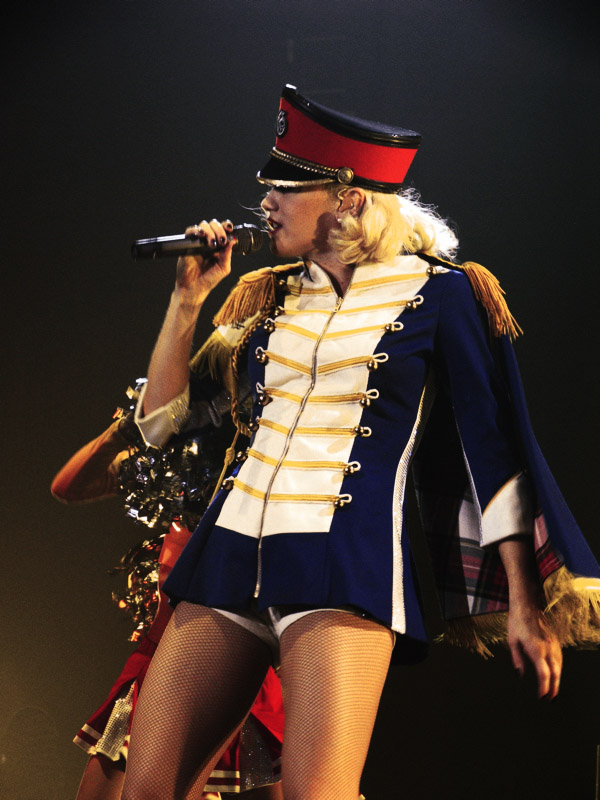
Stefani performing "Hollaback Girl" (2005) during the Harajuku Lovers Tour in 2005; "Let Me Reintroduce Myself" references the song in its lyrics.

Prior to its release, Stefani's new single was predicted by some critics to serve as her official return to pop music, following the release of strictly-holiday themed music and country duets within recent years. Ultimately, "Let Me Reintroduce Myself" was described as a Latin-sounding reggae, ska, and pop song, influenced by Stefani's roots in No Doubt. Kelli Skye Fadroski from the Orange County Register compared the song to early No Doubt, noting the addition of horns and a flamenco-sounding guitar in the instrumentation. Entertainment Weekly's Joey Nolfi described the song's genre as ska pop and noted its use of "warm strings, echoey brass, and groovy keys"; furthermore, he compared its sound to Stefani's previous works, Tragic Kingdom (1995) and Return of Saturn (2000). Calling the song bouncy, the staff at Spin said it was a reggae track that serves as Stefani's "way of cheekily saying that she’s back". Specifying that the song is "reggae-inspired", a staff member for KGSR claimed that the song helped "bring [...] back memories of Stefani’s days with No Doubt". Stefani said her intentions behind the song were to hopefully "bring a little bit of joy" to her fans and return to where she "started musically which was with ska and reggae".

Stefani's brother, Eric Stefani, contributes to the track playing the keyboards and organ. Former No Doubt band member Gabrial McNair also appears, performing on the trombone and Hammond organ. Additional instrumentation in the song's production includes drums by Mano Ruiz, hand clapping by Golan, and bass and guitar performed by Niccoli.

The song opens with the sound of radio tuning static, which Daniel Kreps from Rolling Stone felt was a reference to No Doubt's 2002 single "Underneath It All". Lyrically, the song is about Stefani's career in the music industry. Because of claims by critics that she was ready to release a comeback single, Ross wanted to help Stefani put out a song that called out this idea. Stefani additionally references her 2005 single "Hollaback Girl" in the lyric: "I already gave you bananas / Go ahead and help yourself, me again in your ear". In the first verse, Stefani sings about her anti-comeback: "Not a comeback, I'm recycling me / It's not a comeback, you feel that new energy."

== Critical reception ==
Nolfi called the song an earworm and compared it to Stefani's "days as a ska pop diva" with No Doubt. Similarly, Jason Lipshutz from Billboard declared the song "a slick return to [her] roots". He acknowledged that: "Although it's been a while since Stefani had traipsed through this territory, she still sounds natural doing so." The staff of Paper likened the song to Stefani's days with No Doubt, describing it as "the simply catchy fun that we've come to expect from our queen, and it comes just at the right time". Emily Harris of GSG magazine appreciated that Stefani "stay[ed] true to her original signature sound" while adapting to modern trends. She called the song "a gem with a feel-good cadence", in addition to being highly original. Devon Ivie from Vulture.com seemed to enjoy the song, writing: "This ain't exactly her pink and 'Bathwater' phase, but hey we're just happy that [Blake Shelton] didn't sneak in for some backing vocals during the chorus." Providing a mixed review, Lindsay Zoladz from The New York Times considered some of the lyrics to be clunky, but overall thought that "when her brassy voice rises to match the ska instrumentation of the chorus, there’s a fleeting rush of that old No Doubt magic".

== Chart performance ==
In the United States, "Let Me Reintroduce Myself" did not enter the Billboard Hot 100 chart, but rather Billboard's Digital Song Sales component chart, which ranks the week's best-selling digital songs. It lasted two weeks on the chart, debuting at number 17 during the week of December 18, 2020, and reappearing once in January 2021. It served as the week's second-highest new entry, after Mariah Carey's "Oh Santa!" at number three. In Canada, "Let Me Reintroduce Myself" reached the equivalent digital chart during the same week, peaking at number 19. It spent a total of two weeks on the chart. The song also debuted on the country's Hot AC airplay chart at number 44 during the week ending December 19, 2020. It was the week's highest new entry, and second most added song after "Mood" (2020) by 24kGoldn and Iann Dior. The song later reached at peak of number 36, which it maintained for three consecutive weeks.

In the United Kingdom, the song did not reach the Official Charts Company's UK Singles Chart, but it did chart on the download component chart during the week of January 29, 2021. The song debuted at number 90, the same week that it appeared on the sales component chart at number 92. "Let Me Reintroduce Myself" also appeared on several airplay charts, reaching the top forty in Croatia, the Czech Republic, and Italy.

== Music video ==
A still from the music video for "Let Me Reintroduce Myself", featuring Stefani using the video chatting service Zoom to interact with other versions of herself, who are dressed up in outfits from her older videos.

The accompanying music video was first teased by Stefani in an Instagram post on December 30, 2020. The included photograph featured Stefani's exposed midriff as she wore a "bananas" belt, referencing "Hollaback Girl". The finished video was directed by American photographer Philip Andelman and released to Stefani's YouTube channel on January 1, 2021. It pays homage to Stefani's career in the music industry. In an interview with Today, Stefani said she considered the video's content nostalgic and surreal; she continued: "It made me really think about that I had nobody helping me. Those were outfits that I just made up, you know what I mean, or showed up at my house for free. It's funny because now they are actually people's Halloween costumes. And they were not Halloween costumes at the time, that was me actually being me." The costumes Stefani wore in the video are replicas of the originals, which were on display at her Just a Girl concert residency in Las Vegas.

The video begins with Stefani removing a face mask in order to speak with her producer Steve Berman on the phone. She apologizes before asking for "more money" in order to film the music video, referencing a similar scene with Interscope co-founder Jimmy Iovine from her first solo music video "What You Waiting For?" (2004). The scene then transitions to Stefani filming the music video, followed by a montage of her popular looks from the past few decades. Among the wardrobes she replicated included the No Doubt video looks for "Just a Girl" and "Don't Speak" (1996), and a 1998 red carpet appearance for the annual MTV Video Music Awards. Additional looks include an Alice in Wonderland-influenced outfit, also from "What You Waiting For?", as well as a Japanese and Harajuku Girls-inspired look from Stefani's debut solo studio album Love. Angel. Music. Baby. (2004). The "Just a Girl" Stefani walks into the studio and upstages the current Stefani, who is forced off the set and reacts by calling Berman to complain. The "Just a Girl" Stefani invites the other Stefani clones and the Harajuku Girls dancers to the set, and join her to dance, and the current Stefani decides to join them. Other parts of the video show a screencast of Stefani's laptop, using the video chatting service Zoom to interact with other versions of herself. The video ends with the current Stefani slamming down her laptop in embarrassment after seeing the results of the video shoot; as she turns away, the 1999 VH1 Vogue Fashion Awards Stefani swipes the laptop from her.

Alongside the YouTube release of the music video, it was made available for download via Apple Music on January 1, 2021. The staff at Billboard found that "the video mirrors the light and celebratory tone of the song itself", and called it fun. Philiana Ng from Entertainment Tonight noted how fans seemed to enjoy the video, particularly Stefani's revisiting of prior wardrobes. Additionally, she claimed the clip would make viewers feel nostalgic because of its New Year's Day premiere.

== Live performances ==
Stefani premiered "Let Me Reintroduce Myself" on December 7, 2020, for a performance on The Voice. On December 19, 2020, she performed the song at the Global Citizen Prize awards show while accompanied by "backing dancers and a brass band", and fellow The Voice judge and singer John Legend introduced her on stage. Stefani also sang "Let Me Reintroduce Myself" at other venues, such as The One Show, NBC's New Year's Eve 2021, The Tonight Show Starring Jimmy Fallon, Today. The third performance was also accompanied by a group of four dancers, who wore masks as a pandemic precaution.

== Track listing ==
Digital download/streaming
No.	Title	Length
1.	"Let Me Reintroduce Myself"	3:11

== Credits and personnel ==
Credits adapted from Tidal.

- Gwen Stefani – composer, lyricist, vocalist
- Luke Niccoli – composer, lyricist, bass, guitar, keyboards, programming
- Ross Golan – composer, lyricist, background vocalist, clapping
- Mano Ruiz – drums
- Karl Wingate – engineer, studio personnel
- Gabrial McNair – Hammond organ, trombone
- Eric Stefani – keyboards, organ
- Chris Gehringer – mastering engineer, studio personnel
- Tony Maserati – mixer, studio personnel

== Charts ==
Chart performance for "Let Me Reintroduce Myself"
Chart (2020–2021)	Peak position
Canada Digital Song Sales (Billboard)	19
Canada Hot AC (Billboard)	36
Croatia Airplay (HRT)	28
Czech Republic Airplay (ČNS IFPI)	26
Hungary (Rádiós Top 40)	32
Italy Airplay (EarOne)	11
San Marino (SMRRTV Top 50)	14
Slovakia Airplay (ČNS IFPI)	76
UK Singles Downloads (Official Charts)	90
UK Singles Sales (OCC)	92
US Digital Song Sales (Billboard)	17

== Release history ==
Release dates and formats for "Let Me Reintroduce Myself"
Region	Date	Format(s)	Label	Ref.
Various	December 7, 2020	Digital download; streaming	Interscope	
Italy	December 11, 2020	Radio airplay	Universal	
