= Lubica Kucerova =

Fashion designer aka Lubica Slovak (born 1983)

Lubica
- Born: 27 April 1983 (age 43); Lučenec, Czechoslovakia
- Education: Ryerson University
- Label: Lubica
- Height: 181 cm (5 ft 11 in)
- Awards: The Jamaica Observer designer of the year

Lubica Kucerova (born 27 April 1983), also known as Lubica Slovak, is a Slovak-born fashion designer. She is a Ryerson University graduate and founder of Lubica, clothing company based in Jamaica. Lubica's early childhood influence was her grandmother who was a seamstress. She debuted her self-titled fashion line Lubica in Toronto at the LG Fashion Week in 2005 and has created several collections under her brand: Blue, Bliss, Bloom, Toucan, Trinity, Beyond and Dream. The Lubica line includes bikinis, resort contemporary women's wear and is inspired by the tropics. Lubica is also recognized for her partnership with international recording artist Tami Chynn in opening a female boutique named Belle in Kingston, Jamaica and also their collaboration in designing the award-winning Anuna collection.

== Biography ==
=== Education ===
After moving from Slovakia at age fourteen to live with her father in Canada, Lubica attended Loretto College School before graduating to the University of Toronto where she studied arts management before transferring to Ryerson University to study fashion design. She graduated from Ryerson in 2006 with a Bachelor of Design.

=== Other ===
In 2004, Lubica debuted in her first credited featured film in Canadian drama Saint Ralph, directed by Michael McGowan, starring Adam Butcher and Campbell Scott. The film premiered at the 2004 Toronto International Film Festival, and was officially released to theaters in 2005.

In 2009, Lubica played her first starring role in New Caribbean Cinema Jamaica short movie Coast, written and produced by Nile Saulter, younger brother to famed Jamaican producer and Betta mus Come movie director Storm Saulter. In 2012, Lubica once again teamed up with the Saulter brothers to produce Jamaica's first fashion film Beyond.

In 2010 Lubica made a cameo appearance in Jamaican Reggae-Dancehall music video Messing with my Heart performed by Wayne Marshall (deejay) featuring multi award-winning dancehall act Mavado (singer).

On the Jamaican version of Project Runway, Mission Catwalk Season 1, Lubica was featured as a guest judge. She shared judging responsibilities with The Jamaica Observer's fashion editor Novia McDonald-Whyte, famed Jamaican designers Sandra Kennedy & Carlton Brown, and the shows host and executive producer, Keenea Linton-George. The series was directed by famed Jamaican director Mykal Cushnie.

She also freelances as an overseas journalist for Pravda (Slovakia) newspaper and has written several published articles, including an article on Jamaican sprinter Usain Bolt, who she formerly was in a relationship with.

=== Career ===
In 2004 Lubica hosted her first fashion show at The Distillery District in Toronto, showcasing famed Canadian designer Zoran Dobric while she was still a fashion student at Ryerson University. In 2005, Lubica worked backstage at Caribbean Fashion Week which would inspire her to launch her self-titled Lubica line at the LG Fashion Week in Toronto. In 2006 Lubica debuted her Lubica line in Jamaica at Caribbean Fashion Week. By 2007 at Rock the World Fashion show held in Kingston, Jamaica Lubica would present a full swimsuit crochet collection, which she also introduced at Caribbean Fashion Week in the same year. For Caribbean Fashion Week 2008, Lubica presented her Blue collection, launching her signature Lubica flower applique, where she closed the show with International pop recording artist Tami Chynn. 2008 would also mark the year that Lubica returned to Canada to participate in Fashion Art Toronto: FAT and has since participated in 2008, 2009, 2010, 2011 and 2013. In 2012, Lubica debuted her Beyond line at The Collection fashion series. Audi Jamaica, the event's title sponsor, signed Lubica as their exclusive fashion face, giving the designer an AUDI A1 sports motorcar. She later showcased the updated Beyond collection in September at Kingston Bridal Week 2012 in Kingston, Jamaica and again in November at Bratislavke Modne DNI 2012 in Bratislava, Slovakia. In 2013 Lubica debuted her "Dream" collection at The Collections Moda fashion show in Kingston, Jamaica among other local talented favorites, Project Runway designers – Korto Momolu, Jerell Scott, Gordana Gehlhausen, and a NYC based designer for House of Sukeina, Omar Salaam. Lubica was in the Top 3 pick from the 10 designers by Jamaica Gleaner

In 2017 Lubica returned to her swimwear design with her Fever Collection which featured several one piece swimsuits and monokinis alongside her resort wear. The collection debuted at the Allure Cayman Fashion & Jazz weekend in Grand Cayman and was shot on location by photographer Cortez Vernon for Ellements Magazine.

In 2018 Lubica created her first all swimwear collection called Island. The collection consisted mainly of one piece and high waisted swimsuits both of which became Lubica's specialty.

== Partnerships ==
In 2010, Lubica partnered the international recording artist Tami Chynn to launch a new collection called Anuna. In April, of the same year, the Anuna collection would debut in Canada at Fashion Art Toronto: Toronto Alternative Art and Fashion. Week. In 2011 both Tami and Lubica would collaborate again to launch Belle, the female clothing counterpart to Base Kingston male boutique.

In September 2010, at the fourth annual The Jamaica Observer Style Awards, Lubica and Tami Chynn were awarded Designer of the Year for their Anuna Collection.

In December 2010, in partnership with Mini Countryman, Lubica launched her Toucan inspired collection simultaneously with Mini's new SUV.

In 2012, Audi Jamaica, one of The Collections sponsors, signed Lubica as their exclusive fashion face, giving the designer an AUDI A1 sports motorcar.

Lubica teamed up with the award-winning director Storm Saulter and Nile Saulter ("Better Mus Come") and produced Jamaica's first fashion film called Beyond, which was featured by FashionTV worldwide.

== Fashion shows ==
- The Distillery 2004
- LG Fashion Week 2005
- Cayman Ice Models Fashion show 2006
- Caribbean Fashion Week 2006
- Rock the World 2007
- Caribbean Fashion Week 2007
- Fashion Art Toronto:Toronto Alternative Art and Fashion Week 2008
- Fashion Art Toronto:Toronto Alternative Art and Fashion Week 2009
- Anuna Launch 2010
- Fashion Art Toronto:Toronto Alternative Art and Fashion Week 2010
- Toucan & Countryman mini Launch 2010
- Fashion Art Toronto: Toronto Alternative Art Fashion Week 2011
- The Collections 2012: Kingston, Jamaica
- Kingston Bridal Week 2012: Kingston, Jamaica
- Bratislavske Modne DNI 2012: Bratislava, Slovakia
