= We Be Burnin' =

2005 single by Sean Paul

Single by Sean Paul

from the album The Trinity
- B-side: "Bounce It Right There"
- Released: 22 August 2005
- Genre: Dancehall
- Length: 3:35
- Label: Atlantic; VP
- Songwriters: Sean Henriques; Steven Marsden; Delano Thomas; Michael Jarrett; Craig Serani Marsh; Cezar Cunningham
- Producers: Delano Thomas; Michael Jarrett; Andre Saunders

Sean Paul singles chronology
| "I'm Still in Love with You" (2004) | "We Be Burnin'" (2005) | "Ever Blazin'" (2005) |

"We Be Burnin'" is the first single from Jamaican musician Sean Paul's third studio album, The Trinity (2005). It achieved success worldwide, becoming a top-10 hit on at least 10 national music charts, including those of Germany, Italy, the United Kingdom, and the United States.

== Background and release ==
"We Be Burnin'" was released as the first single from The Trinity on 22 August 2005 in the US and on 12 September 2005 in the UK. In the US, the single peaked inside the Billboard Hot 100 at number six, and in the UK, the single peaked at number two. The single became his biggest solo hit in the UK, beating the number-three peak of "Like Glue" in 2003 and spending just under five months inside the UK top 75. It was the biggest hit from the album in the UK; however, it was "Temperature" that was the biggest hit from the album in the US.

The original version, sometimes denoted by the title being followed by "Legalize It", features prominent themes of marijuana use, referencing "trees", "weed" and "herb" several times and smoking it for "meditation". Another radio-friendly version was released with the title being followed by "Recognize It", which changed all drug-related lyrics to ones concerning women.

Although the lyrics are different, Tami Chynn's single "Hyperventilating" as well as Capleton's "Or Wah" from the album Reign of Fire utilize the same riddim as Sean Paul's "We Be Burnin'", since both use the riddim "Stepz".

== Music video ==
The video was shot in Southern California deserts by Jessy Terrero, With the support of the creative direction of AVA (Alien Visions, Anamorphic) A Quintanilla, Director showing dancers accompanying Paul, and two girls in an overheated Hummer H2. Sean Paul is seen dancing with three other girls in front of highly modified trucks.

== Track listings ==
US 12-inch single

A1. "We Be Burnin'" (Legalize It club version) – 3:28
A2. "We Be Burnin'" (instrumental) – 3:52
B1. "We Be Burnin'" (Recognize It radio version) – 3:36
B2. "We Be Burnin'" (instrumental) – 3:53

UK CD1 and European CD single

1. "We Be Burnin'" (Recognize It)
2. "We Be Burnin'" (Legalize It)

UK CD2

1. "We Be Burnin'" (Recognize It)
2. "Bounce It Right There"
3. "We Be Burnin" (video)
4. Ringtone

UK 12-inch single

A1. "We Be Burnin'" (Recognize It)
A2. "We Be Burnin'" (instrumental)
B1. "We Be Burnin'" (Legalize It)
B2. "Bounce It Right There"

Australian CD single

1. "We Be Burnin'" (Recognize It)
2. "Bounce It Right There"
3. "We Be Burnin'" (Legalize It)

== Charts ==
=== Weekly charts ===
| Chart (2005–2006) | Peak position |
|---|---|
| Australia (ARIA) | 34 |
| Australian Urban (ARIA) | 12 |
| Austria (Ö3 Austria Top 40) | 10 |
| Belgium (Ultratop 50 Flanders) | 9 |
| Belgium (Ultratop 50 Wallonia) | 7 |
| Canada CHR/Pop Top 30 (Radio & Records) | 11 |
| Czech Republic (IFPI) | 18 |
| Denmark (Tracklisten) | 16 |
| Europe (Eurochart Hot 100) | 3 |
| Finland (Suomen virallinen lista) | 8 |
| France (SNEP) | 78 |
| Germany (GfK) | 5 |
| Hungary (Rádiós Top 40) | 26 |
| Hungary (Single Top 40) | 2 |
| Ireland (IRMA) | 11 |
| Italy (FIMI) | 6 |
| Netherlands (Dutch Top 40) | 8 |
| Netherlands (Single Top 100) | 6 |
| Russia Airplay (TopHit) | 24 |
| Scottish Singles Sales (Official Charts) | 4 |
| Sweden (Sverigetopplistan) | 14 |
| Switzerland (Schweizer Hitparade) | 6 |
| UK Singles (Official Charts) | 2 |
| US Billboard Hot 100 | 6 |
| US Hot R&B/Hip-Hop Songs (Billboard) | 17 |
| US Hot Rap Songs (Billboard) | 6 |
| US Pop Airplay (Billboard) | 9 |
| US Rhythmic Airplay (Billboard) | 8 |

=== Year-end charts ===
| Chart (2005) | Position |
|---|---|
| Austria (Ö3 Austria Top 40) | 67 |
| Belgium (Ultratop 50 Flanders) | 55 |
| Belgium (Ultratop 50 Wallonia) | 29 |
| Europe (Eurochart Hot 100) | 19 |
| Germany (Media Control GfK) | 50 |
| Italy (FIMI) | 37 |
| Netherlands (Dutch Top 40) | 56 |
| Netherlands (Single Top 100) | 26 |
| Russia Airplay (TopHit) | 116 |
| Sweden (Hitlistan) | 90 |
| Switzerland (Schweizer Hitparade) | 47 |
| UK Singles (OCC) | 27 |
| UK Urban (Music Week) | 30 |
| US Billboard Hot 100 | 88 |
| US Mainstream Top 40 (Billboard) | 99 |
| US Rhythmic Top 40 (Billboard) | 66 |

| Chart (2006) | Position |
|---|---|
| US Billboard Hot 100 | 81 |

== Certifications ==
| Region | Certification | Certified units/sales |
|---|---|---|
| Canada (Music Canada) | Gold | 10,000^{*} |
| Denmark (IFPI Danmark) | Gold | 4,000^{^} |
| Germany (BVMI) | Gold | 150,000^{^} |
| Japan (RIAJ) | Gold | 100,000^{*} |
| United Kingdom (BPI) | Gold | 400,000^{‡} |
| United States (RIAA) | Platinum | 1,000,000^{‡} |
Ringtone
| United States (RIAA) | Gold | 500,000^{*} |
^{*} Sales figures based on certification alone.^{^} Shipments figures based on certification alone.^{‡} Sales+streaming figures based on certification alone.

== Release history ==
| Region | Date | Format(s) | Label(s) | Ref(s). |
|---|---|---|---|---|
| United States | 22 August 2005 | Rhythmic contemporary radio | Atlantic; VP | |
| United Kingdom | 12 September 2005 | 12-inch vinyl; CD; digital download | Atlantic; VP | |
| United States | 19 September 2005 | Contemporary hit radio | Atlantic; VP | |
| Australia | 3 October 2005 | CD | Atlantic; VP | |
