= The Alliance (band) =

- Origin: Jamaica
- Genres: Dancehall, reggae
- Years active: 2003–present
- Members: Bounty Killer, Busy Signal, Kiprich, Bling Dawg
- Past members: Mavado, Vybz Kartel, Aidonia
- Website: Official website www.mediavybz.com

The Alliance is a group of dancehall deejays. Founded by Bounty Killer, the Alliance includes long-time collaborators like Angel Doolas and protégés like Elephant Man. Because of their high profile, some worried that the Alliance was established to "rule" the dancehall business by choosing which riddim to voice. These worries led to the war between Vybz Kartel and Ninja Man.

== History ==
The Alliance was formed in 2003 by dancehall artist Bounty Killer and close friends as 'the heavyweights'. These included Busy Signal, Wayne Marshall, Mavado and Vybz Kartel. Vybz Kartel later left after a heated dispute. The Alliance then comprised the core members and multiple Jamaican dancehall artists. Serani and his production label DASECA is also part of the crew. Vybz Kartel now leads the Portmore Empire known as the Gaza.

In 2011, The Alliance further expanded with the formation of The Alliance Next Generation.
