= E pluribus unum (disambiguation) =

E pluribus unum (Latin for Out of Many, One) is a Latin phrase on the great seal of the United States.

E pluribus unum may also refer to:

- E Pluribus Unum (album), a 1969 album by Sandy Bull
- É Pluribus Unum, a 2007 album by Mode 9
- E pluribus unum, a song by Supernaut from the 2000 album Raj na nebu, pakao na Zemlji
- E-Pluribus-Unum, a song by Material from the 1991 album The Third Power
- E Pluribus Unum, a 1917 march by Fred Jewell
- E Pluribus Unum (Wilson), a public artwork proposed by Fred Wilson in 2011
- E Pluribus Unum: Television and U.S. Fiction, a 1993 essay by David Foster Wallace
- E Pluribus Unum, an essay from the 1984 book The Subatomic Monster by Isaac Asimov
- E Pluribus Unum, a 1982 sculpture by Eli Marozzi
- E Pluribus Unum, an 1866 story by Fitz Hugh Ludlow
- E Pluribus Unum, a poem by George Washington Cutter
- E Pluribus Unum, an episode of Madam Secretary, season five
- E Pluribus Unum, an episode of Stranger Things, season three

== See also ==
- Out of Many...One, a 2006 album by Tami Chynn
- "E Peterbus Unum", an episode of the animated series Family Guy
- One out of many (disambiguation)
- Unum (disambiguation)
