= Serani =

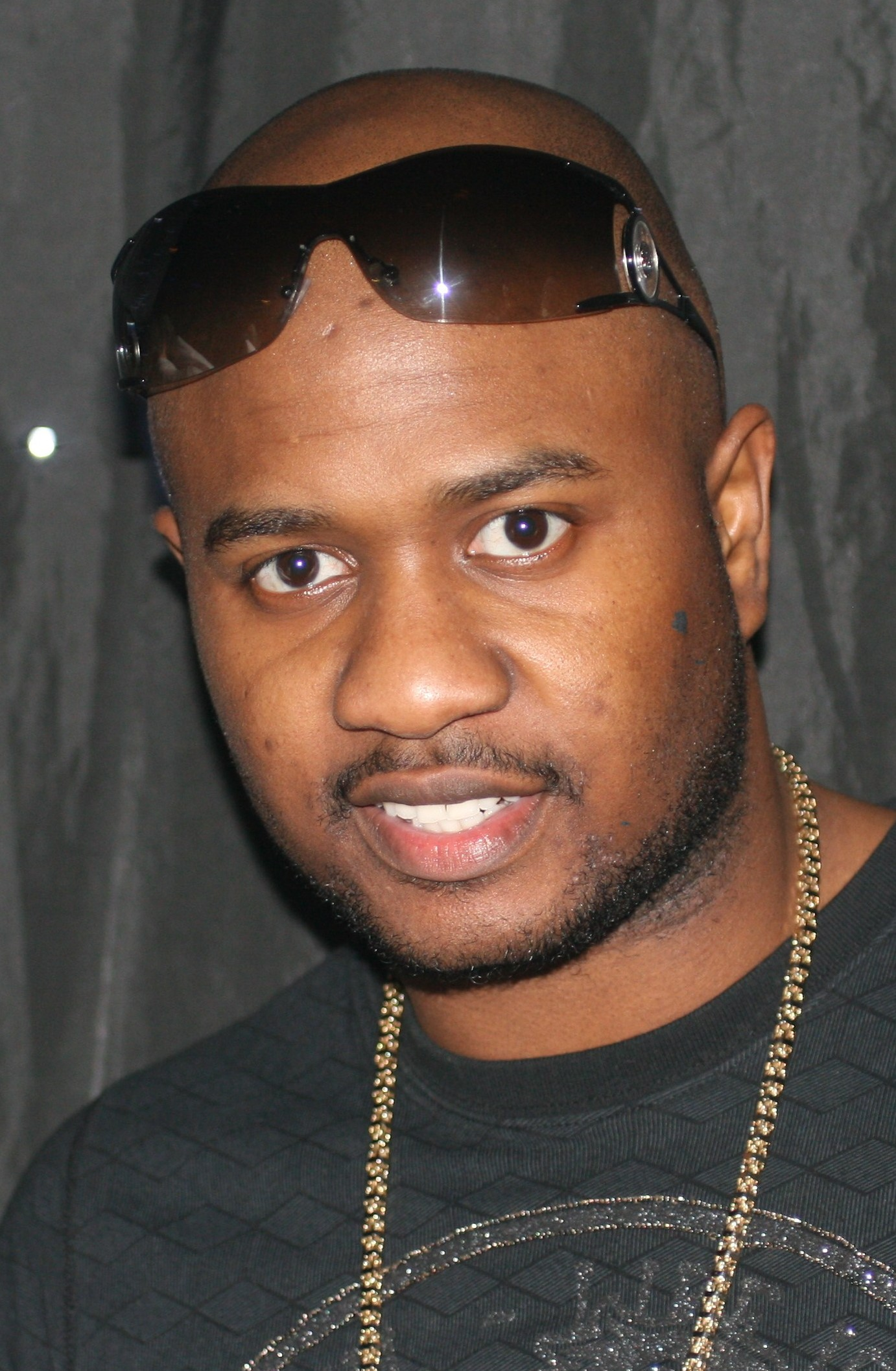
- Serani in 2009

Background information
- Born: Craig Serani Marsh; 7 June 1982 (age 44); Kingston, Jamaica
- Genres: Reggae; dancehall
- Occupations: Singer; songwriter; record producer
- Years active: 2006–present
- Label: Phase One

Craig Serani Marsh (born 7 June 1982), known professionally as Serani, is a Jamaican singer. He is best known for his work on Sean Paul's album The Trinity and his 2008 single "No Games".

== Early life ==
Marsh was born in Kingston, Jamaica. He and his two best friends David and Craig Harrisingh, who also shared the same interest in music, put together the Daseca production team in 2001. They had a goal to produce all the major reggae artists in Jamaica.

== Career ==
=== 2006–2008: Early career ===
In 2006, Serani co-produced the first two singles on Sean Paul's platinum album The Trinity, including "We Be Burnin'", which was the first released single. "We Be Burnin'" track helped The Trinity break a Jamaican record of 107,000 copies sold in the first week. Serani also produced the album Smash riddim, which hosts the song "Dutty Wine" by Tony Matterhorn. "Dutty Wine" was the number one song in Jamaica and England for a lengthy period of time. Serani is credited for helping bring into the limelight other Jamaican heavyweights such as Mavado, Alaine Laughton, and Bugle with his catchy beats such as the Anger Management riddim on which Mavado voiced his landmark hit "Real McCoy". Daseca has also produced hits for other reggae icons such as their colleague and Alliance crew leader Bounty Killer, Busy Signal, and Vybz Kartel, amongst many others. They are also the backbone of the Alliance affiliated band Anger Management. His first and very successful attempt at singing was on Mavado's hit song "Dying", which is featured on the latter's debut album Gangsta for Life: The Symphony of David Brooks. He sang the hook and Mavado chanted the verses.

=== 2008–present: Rise to fame and No Games ===
In 2008, Serani landed a contract to record two albums for JVC Entertainment, before going on to sign the deal with Phase One. Serani self-produces most of his own songs and has promoted singles such as "Doh" (featuring Bugle), "No Games", and "She Loves Me". In 2012, he performed at the Ride Club in Vienna.

In 2020, "No Games" was sampled by Eminem for "Farewell", which appeared on his album Music to Be Murdered By.

== Discography ==
=== Albums ===
Year	Album details	Peak chart positions	
Year	Album details	US R&B	US Reggae
2009	No Games: Released: 27 October 2009; Label: Phase One, Rockstone; Formats: CD, digital download	77	3
2012	It's Serani: Released: 22 May 2012; Label: Phase One, Rockstone; Formats: CD, digital download	—	—

=== Singles ===
- 2008: "No Games" – BPI: Platinum
- 2008: "She Loves Me"
- 2008: "Doh"
- 2008: "Mama Still Hungry"
- 2008: "Stinkin' Rich"
- 2008: "Study People"
- 2009: "Is This Real"
- 2009: "Romance"
- 2009: "Naked"
- 2009: "When It's Cold" (2009)
- 2010: "She Loves Me" (remix featuring Fuego)
- 2010: "Que Buena Tu Ta" (remix featuring Fuego)
- 2010: "Skip to My Luu" (featuring Ding Dong)
- 2010: "Searching"
- 2011: "Dear Lord"
