= Death and Dying =

Death and Dying may refer to:

- OMEGA - Journal of Death and Dying, a peer-reviewed academic journal covering all aspects of the study of death and dying
- On Death and Dying, 1969 book by Swiss-born psychiatrist Elisabeth Kübler-Ross, about her five stages of grief model

== See also ==
- Death (disambiguation)
- Dying (disambiguation)
- Category:People involved with death and dying
