= Together as One =

Together as One may refer to:

- Together as One (Elan Atias album), 2006
- Together as One (Hillsong album)
- Together as One (festival), an electronic music festival
