= Chris Marshall (songwriter) =

Jamaican singer, songwriter and singjay

- Also known as: Izes, Chris Marsh, Chris Marshall
- Born: Adrian Christopher Marshall; Linstead, Saint Catherine Parish, Jamaica
- Genres: Reggae; dancehall; reggae fusion
- Occupations: Singer, songwriter, musician, producer
- Instruments: Vocals, piano
- Years active: 2004–present
- Label: Rich Music

Chris Marshall, whose real name is Adrian Christopher Marshall, otherwise known as Chris Marsh, and Izes, is a Jamaican reggae and dancehall singer, producer songwriter and singjay. He is best known for co-writing "Temperature", by Sean Paul which became a Billboard Hot 100 number-one song in 2006 and appearing on Anitta's album Kisses on the single - "Tu Y Yo".

== Life and career ==
Marshall was born in Linstead, Jamaica. He started producing and performing on local concerts at the age of twelve. He attended St. Mary High and McGrath High in St. Catherine.

== Discography ==
=== As songwriter ===
- "Leyenda" by Justin Quiles from the album Realidadd , 2019
- "Temperature" by Sean Paul from the album The Trinity, 2005
- "Heart Attack" by Beenie Man from the album Undisputed, 2006
- "Tu Y Yo" by Anitta with Chris Marshall, from the album Kisses, 2019
- "Prendía" by Dalex, from the album Climax, 2019

=== As featured artist ===
- "Tu Y Yo" by Anitta with Chris Marshall, from the album Kisses, 2019
- "Na Na Na" by Dalex ft. Alex Rose, Gigolo y La Exce, Chris Marshall, From the album la Neuva Ola 2018
- "Fiya Blaza" by Dvbbs X GTA ft Chris Marshall From the album Blood Of My Blood 2017

=== As record producer ===
- Gal Farm (2015) by Popcaan
