= God & Time =

Studio album by Vybz Kartel
- Released: 5 June 2026
- Genre: Dancehall
- Length: 37:29
- Label: TJ Records, Vybz Kartel Musik
- Producer: Linton "TJ" White

Vybz Kartel chronology
| Heart & Soul (2025) | God & Time (2026) |

God & Time is the 19th studio album by dancehall artist Vybz Kartel. It was released on 5 June 2026. The album was produced by TJ Records and Vybz Kartel Musik, and distributed by Zojack Worldwide.

== Production and release ==
Vybz Kartel had said that the album will not feature any "gangster lyrics", but will instead focus on introspective content and songs aimed at a female audience. The album has been described as Kartel's "most personal and sonically expansive” album since he regained his freedom.

Kartel said that he named the album God & Time, an expression from Jamaican slang and something that his lawyer would tell Kartel while he was incarcerated.

The first single from the album, titled Panic, is produced by TJ Records and Vybz Kartel Musik. It features Jamaican artist Shenseea. The album will also feature Mavado on the song Hype Life, an artist with whom Kartel has had a long-standing feud. A post-release single from the album, titled God is the Greatest has surpassed 30 million views as of 20 May 2026. The album also features artists Farruko and Skillibeng.

The album features 14 tracks, and songs have been produced by Gold Up, Zack Fostaty, Raphael Vivet, and Redboom Supamix.

== Reception ==
According to a review on Voxmellow, the album brings "calm but determined street energy", making a "strong impression".

A review on Riddims World said the album is "like a statement record more than a casual summer set", praising Kartel for the use of melody, mood and audience appeal. The album shows influences from pop music from around the Caribbean and the world, while staying true to its dancehall roots.

Munchy, writing for Reggaeville, said the album balances "reflection, celebration, vulnerability, and raw dancehall energy that only [Vybz Kartel] can".

== Track listing ==
1. God and Time
2. Soft Girl Era
3. Some Days
4. Genie
5. Confessions
6. Stay for the Night (feat. Wizkid)
7. Casi Casi (feat. Farruko)
8. Panic (feat. Shenseea)
9. Round and Round
10. Try Again (feat. Skillibeng)
11. Hype Life (feat. Mavado)
12. Dancehall Ting
13. Big Business
14. Watch Over Me
