= Hypnotico =

Song by Jennifer Lopez

from the album Love?
- Released: April 29, 2011
- Recorded: 2011
- Studio: Henson (Hollywood)
- Genre: Dance pop, Eurodance
- Length: 3:36
- Label: Island
- Songwriters: RedOne; Lady Gaga; Aliaune Thiam; Claude Kelly; Tami Chynn
- Producers: Jimmy Joker; Kuk Harrell

Audio video
- "Hypnotico" on YouTube

"Hypnotico" is a song recorded by American entertainer Jennifer Lopez for her seventh studio album Love? (2011). It was originally written by RedOne, Lady Gaga, Aliaune "Akon" Thiam, Claude Kelly and Tami Chynn for Chynn's second studio album Prima Donna in 2007. RedOne and Akon flew Gaga and Kelly to Los Angeles to write songs for Chynn, with "Hypnotico" becoming the first song of several songs they had written together. The release of Prima Donna was cancelled and "Hypnotico" was thought to be a "lost cause" by its writers. That was until 2011, when Lopez became interested in recording the song while working with RedOne, following her move to Island Records.

Jimmy Joker provided production for Lopez's version of "Hypnotico", while her vocals were produced by Kuk Harrell. "Hypnotico" is an up-tempo dance song that contains a "chunky beat" and retro-1980s synths, with an "old-school feel". It received generally mixed reviews from music critics, who called it single-worthy. Some critics noticed similarities between "Hypnotico" and other Lady Gaga songs, such as "Poker Face" (2008).

== Writing and recording ==
"Hypnotico" was written by RedOne, Lady Gaga, Aliaune "Akon" Thiam, Claude Kelly and Tami Chynn. In 2007, Gaga and Kelly were working with RedOne in a small recording studio in Queens, New York. Gaga was writing "what would later become" her debut studio album The Fame (2008) and Kelly was writing songs with RedOne to pitch to other artists. Kelly recalled the events by saying: "We were all friends and often rode the train together to get to the studio". RedOne began working with Akon, who had signed Chynn to his record label. Akon and RedOne flew Gaga and Kelly to Los Angeles to write songs for Chynn's second studio album Prima Donna. "Hypnotico" became the first of several songs they had written together. From that trip, according to Kelly, "Akon met, signed and helped launch Lady Gaga's career". Kelly credits the trip as also helping to launch his own songwriting career. He states that he and Akon became good friends and writing partners. Akon gave Kelly a CD of working tracks as a basis for composition. From that CD of tracks he wrote songs for Leona Lewis ("Forgive Me"), Whitney Houston ("Like I Never Left", "I Got You") and Michael Jackson ("Hold My Hand"). According to Kelly, "Hypnotico" is a "symbol of how dreams come true if you work hard, and a constant reminder of how far I've come. I'm still extremely grateful for all that I've achieved".

Chynn recorded "Hypnotico" in early 2008 at a studio in Atlanta, Georgia with Akon and RedOne producing, as part of her 13-track Prima Donna project initially intended for release in August 2008. "Hypnotico" was considered as a possible single release for Chynn's Prima Donna project, the second single after "Frozen", but after the album was cancelled, Kelly thought the song to be a "lost cause". The song remained unused by any artist until 2011, when Lopez became interested in recording it while working with RedOne. Lopez's version of the song was produced by Jimmy Joker. Her vocals were arranged by RedOne, produced by Kuk Harrell and recorded by Harrell and Josh Gudwin at Henson Recording Studios in Los Angeles. Lopez's vocals were then edited by Harrell and Chris "Tek" O'Ryan. RedOne provided instruments for the song. The song was later mixed by Trevor Muzzy.

While working with RedOne, Lopez insists that he brought the best out of her, crediting this to his Moroccan, Swedish and American heritage. She stated: "He's awesome. He's one of the nicest people and has a beautiful spirit. He can create something the whole world will love and that is probably to do with his international background. Some people can do dance, others can do urban or pop, but Nadir does it all and understand what makes a hit on every level". Lopez and Gaga did not work on the song together in person. According to Lopez, RedOne brought Gaga into the process because they have worked together a lot in the past. She cited the process as being "kind of cool" and that Gaga is a "great songwriter: I don't just love her lyrics, but also her melodies".

== Composition ==
"Hypnotico" (2011)
A twenty-four second sample of "Hypnotico", a dance song with a "chunky beat" and retro-80s synths.

"Hypnotico" is an up-tempo dance song that contains a "chunky beat" and retro-1980s synths, with an "old-school feel". Categorized as a "synth-heavy record", the dancehall-tinged track also contains handclaps and "boy-toying," with syllables and a "boricua shoutout", all running at 119 bpm. It opens with Lopez calling out: "All the girls that know they sexy, come on!". "They love me for my body / I'm original sexy," sings Lopez over the "bombastic bassline" before the chanting chorus kicks in: "All the boys are lovin' when we do our thing / We just some silly heartbreakers tonight".

DJ Shane Phoenix considered "Hypnotico" to be a "dub-style track". He wrote that it "has some great breaks", a "serious electro key line", and he thought the repetitive bassline would be good for dancing. According to Emily Exton of Popdust, the song's "light and catchy" chorus "declares herself just one among a group of innocent flirts"; it allows Lopez to showcase "some range" and provides a nice counter to the "repetitive, staccato breakdown of the song’s title that precedes it". Exton also pointed out that "hyp-not, hyp-not-ico" is almost identical to "On the Floor"'s "up on the floor, up on the floor". Nyree McFarlane from Gulfnews named the song as "euphoric", adding that it was a "true club track."

== Critical response ==
"Hypnotico" received generally mixed reviews from music critics. Several journalists noted the similarities between the song and other Gaga works, with Brad Wete of Entertainment Weekly stating that it sounded like "a watered down version of 'Poker Face'" and Scott Shetler of PopCrush elaborating that "like many of [Lady] Gaga's songs", it is "likely to stick in your head long after the song has ended". Allison Stewart from The Washington Post further expanded on this view, stating that "without the slightest hint of noblesse oblige" to Gaga, "Hypnotico" is a synthy, "burbly slip" of a song. Eliot Glazer of MTV Buzzworthy stated that the song seems to continue right where Lopez's 1999 hit single "Waiting for Tonight" left off, "making us want to put on our short shorts and dance". In addition, he concluded that "The thump that rides the song's undercurrent of ethereal echoes and a group chant of the chorus is a pretty solid reminder that this is most definitely a Gaga jam, which quickly gained J. Lo's approval". Amos Barshad of Vulture showcased his displeasure with the song, elaborating that although "you can sort of tell" that Gaga wrote the song, that was not an indication that it would become an instant hit, casting it as "Bland and half-baked", and concluding that "it was certainly farmed out for a reason".

Shane Phoenix of Hot Spots gave a positive review of the song, stating that "the girls are going to love the lyrics. It brings total sex appeal and groove that starts the hips swinging and is so meant to break the set into a dark drive and into sensual exploration of a grind close contact dance rhythm". Rich Lopez of the Dallas Voice cited the song as being one of the "better" songs of Love? and was surprised it had "yet to be released as a single". Brad Wete of Entertainment Weekly complimented the potential of the song by stating that it is "sure to fit right into club DJ mixes and get people dancing"; however, he criticized that Gaga was "all over the song ... as if Lopez went into the booth trying to emulate her delivery." Emily Exton of Popdust agreed, adding that "you'd be silly not to think" that the song's chorus will become a dance-floor chant among "slightly intoxicated females (and males) in bars across America this summer". She additionally wrote that it was "impossible to get [the song] out of your head after more than one listen" although becoming "increasingly monotonous over nearly three and half minutes" Digital Spy's Robert Copsey roughly expanded on this view, stating that "Hypnotico" is not anything "we haven't heard before," although elaborating that it is worthy of a standalone release.

Katie Hasty of HitFix was not impressed by the lyrical potential of the song, stating that with lines like "sunburned baby / hurts like crazy," "we're just some silly heartbreakers tonight" and rhyming "yum yum" with "some some" won't get this song "very good scores on the SAT". She concluded by stating that: "In fact, it seems that Lopez goes out of her way to sing with a little-girl inflection to her 41-year-old pipes. But it comes off youthful, upbeat, and a little lighter than the single ['On the Floor'] and her island-inflected collaboration with Lil Wayne, 'I'm Into You'." Amos Barshad of Vulture questioned Lopez' music, stating that "with the other facets of her multimedia empire clicking [...] why does she insist on continuing to make music? Why not sit back, relax, and enjoy the fact that there is something that you do that people like? [...] Well, one can only assume, Jennifer Lopez keeps making music because Jennifer Lopez actually loves making music. And that's admirable".

== Credits and personnel ==
Credits adapted from the liner notes of Love?.

Locations

- Recorded at Henson Recording Studios in Los Angeles

Personnel

- RedOne – vocal arrangement, instruments, songwriter
- Jennifer Lopez - lead vocals
- Lady Gaga – songwriter
- Aliaune Thiam – songwriter
- Claude Kelly – songwriter
- Tami Chynn – songwriter, additional vocals
- Jimmy Joker – record producer
- Chris "Tek" O'Ryan – vocal editor
- Kuk Harrell – vocal editor, vocal producer, vocal recording engineer
- Josh Gudwin – vocal recording engineer
- Trevor Muzzy – mixing
