= Hyperventilating =

Hyperventilating and variants may refer to:

- Hyperventilation, the act of hyperventilating
- Hyperventilation syndrome, a medical condition involving hyperventilating
- Cheyne–Stokes respiration, the breathing disorder
- Hypocapnia, a physiological result of hyperventilating
- "Hyperventilating" (song), a 2006 song by Tami Chynn
