= Unum (disambiguation) =

Unum is an American insurance company.

Unum may also refer to:

- Unum (number format), a suggested replacement for the IEEE floating point format
- Unum ex Quator or simply Unum, a 12th-century text by Clement of Llanthony

== See also ==
- Unam sanctam, a 1302 papal bull
- E pluribus unum (disambiguation) (Latin: Out of Many, One)
