= The Trinity (album) =

Studio album by Sean Paul
- Released: 27 September 2005
- Recorded: 2002–2005
- Length: 62:16
- Label: VP; Atlantic
- Producer: Donovan "Don Corleon" Bennett, Renaissance Crew, Rohan "Jah Snowcone" Fuller, Steven "Lenky" Marsden, Craig "Leftside" Parks, Supa Dups

Sean Paul chronology
Dutty Rock (2002)	The Trinity (2005)	Imperial Blaze (2009)

Singles from The Trinity
- 1. "We Be Burnin'" Released: 22 August 2005; 2. "Ever Blazin'" Released: 28 November 2005; 3. "Never Gonna Be the Same" Released: 18 August 2005; 4. "Temperature" Released: 5 December 2005; 5. "Give It Up to Me" Released: 6 June 2006

The Trinity is the third studio album by Jamaican dancehall musician Sean Paul, released in the United States by Atlantic Records on 27 September 2005.

== Background ==
It was recorded entirely in Jamaica, with Henriques collaborating with producers on the island such as Steven "Lenky" Marsden, Donovan "Don Corleon" Bennett, Renaissance Crew, and Rohan "Jah Snowcone" Fuller, among others. Explaining the album's title, Henriques pointed out that it is his third album, and has spent three years in production, being "all done right here in the Third World."

== Release and promotion ==
The album was preceded by the single "We Be Burnin'," which commenced radio play on 22 August 2005. The music video for the single was directed by Jessy Terrero. It was featured on the Black Entertainment Television series Access Granted on 17 August 2005 and premiered online on 18 August 2005 at MTV.com. The single itself has peaked at number two on the UK Singles Chart. It also peaked at number five on the U.S. Billboard Hot 100 and seventeen on Billboard's R&B/Hip-hop charts.

In the UK, Atlantic Records released an expanded two-CD edition of The Trinity on 26 June 2006. It contained all original 18 tracks on the first disc and contained six extra tracks on the second disc including the singles "Cry Baby Cry" with Carlos Santana and Joss Stone along with "Break It Off" featuring Rihanna.

== Critical reception ==
Professional ratings
Aggregate scores
Source	Rating
Metacritic	67/100
Review scores
Source	Rating
Allmusic	2.5/5 stars
Blender	2/5 stars
Entertainment Weekly	B−
The Guardian	3/5 stars
RapReviews	(7/10)
Rolling Stone	3/5 stars
Stylus	A−
USA Today	3/4 stars
Vibe	4/5 stars
Yahoo! Music UK	(8/10)

The album received generally positive reviews. At Metacritic, which assigns a normalized rating out of 100 to reviews from mainstream critics, the album has received an average score of 67, based on ten reviews, indicating "generally favorable reviews". Tim Sendra of Allmusic gave the album 2.5 stars out of 5, criticizing its lack of pop-sounding music by stating "rather than going even further pop, Paul heads toward a harder, more aggressive sound.... it's still disappointing for Trinity to be as empty and unenjoyable as it is. Maybe even slightly heartbreaking for anyone who really felt that Dutty Rock would be the first in a long series of great pop records Sean Paul would release." Jonathan Ringen of Rolling Stone gave the album 3 stars out of 5 and in conclusion for the review had stated "But while Trinity is consistently engaging, it never quite achieves Dutty's immediate, overwhelming pop appeal. Sean Paul still knows how to get a party started -- he just won't be setting the world on fire." Jay Soul of RapReviews gave the album a 7 out of 10 score, praising the radio-friendly hit singles but criticizing the other tracks by saying; "More than this was how average the rest of the album was - credit to Sean Paul for keeping much of the LP Jamaican-based but, like Craig David's second effort "Slicker Than Your Average," keeping it too localised backfired." Steve Jones of USA Today gave the album a more positive review with a 3 out of 4 star rating, crediting Sean Paul for "staying true to his roots" and keeping the "rawness of his sound" by working with only local Jamaican producers for the album.

The album was nominated for Best Reggae Album at the 48th Annual Grammy Awards.

== Commercial performance ==
The Trinity opened at number 5 on US Billboard 200, selling over 107,000 copies in its first week. It marked the highest ever reggae/Dancehall debut and single sales week sales for a reggae artist in SoundScan history. The album also became Paul's second album after Dutty Rock to debut atop the US Reggae Albums chart. On November 2, 2005, it was certified Gold by the Recording Industry Association of America (RIAA). By April 2009, The Trinity had sold 1,312,000 copies in the United States. It eventually reached 2× Platinum staus on March 28, 2024, representing sales of over 2 million units. In Canada, the album peaked at number four on the Canadian Albums Chart and earned a Platinum certification for selling over 100,000 units.

The album also was certified Platinum in Europe. It reached number four in the Flemish region of Belgian and Switzerland, number five on the French Albums Chart, number six in Austria, number eight in Italy, and number nine in Germany. The album was certified 2× Platinum in France with over 400,000 units sold, Platinum in the United Kingdom for sales of 300,000 units, and Gold certifications in Belgium (25,000 units), Germany (100,000 units), Ireland (7,500 units), and Switzerland (20,000 units). In Japan, The Trinity peaked at number eight on the Oricon Albums Chart and earned a Platinum certification from the Recording Industry Association of Japan (RIAJ) for sales exceeding 250,000 units. In 2014, it was reported that the album had sold 4 million copies worldwide.

== Track listing ==
The Trinity track listing
No.	Title	Writer(s)	Producer(s)	Length
1.	"Fire Links Intro"			0:49
2.	"Head in the Zone"	Sean Paul Henriques; Delano Thomas; Theron Thomas; Timothy Thomas; Michael Jarrett; Cezar Cunningham; Craig Marsh	Delano Thomas; Michael "Factor" Jarrett; Andre Saunders	3:55
3.	"We Be Burnin'"	S. Henriques; Steven Marsden; Thomas; Jarrett; Cunningham; Marsh	Delano Thomas; Michael "Factor" Jarrett; Andre Saunders	3:35
4.	"Send It On"	S. Henriques; Jason Henriques; Marsden; Dansel Cole	Steven "Lenky" Marsden; Jeremy Harding^{[a]}	3:38
5.	"Ever Blazin'"	S. Henriques; J. Henriques; Marsden; Rohan Stevens	Steven "Lenky" Marsden	3:10
6.	"Eye Deh a Mi Knee"	S. Henriques; Donovan Bennett; Nigel Staff	Donovan "Vendetta" Bennett	2:58
7.	"Give It Up to Me" (Radio Version)	S. Henriques; J. Henriques; Bennett; Staff	Donovan "Vendetta" Bennett	4:04
8.	"Yardie Bone" (featuring Wayne Marshall)	S. Henriques; Bennett; Staff; Wayne Mitchell; Terrence Harold	Donovan "Vendetta" Bennett	3:12
9.	"Never Gonna Be the Same"	S. Henriques; Bennett; Staff	Donovan "Vendetta" Bennett	3:40
10.	"I'll Take You There"	S. Henriques; Craig Parks	Craig "Leftside" Parks; Jeremy Harding^{[a]}	3:56
11.	"Temperature"	S. Henriques; Andre Marshall; Rohan Fuller	Rohan "Jah Snowcone" Fuller	3:36
12.	"Breakout"	S. Henriques; J. Henriques; Omari Stines; Patrick Samuels; Daniel Lewis	Roach; Omari Stines	2:59
13.	"Head to Toe"	S. Henriques; Bennett; Paul Edmund; Andre Gray	Donovan" Vendetta" Bennett	4:21
14.	"Connection" (featuring Nina Sky)	S. Henriques; Nicole Albino; Natalie Albino; Parks; Marlon Cooke; Elijah Wells; Lionel Bermingham	Marlon "Pyrana" Cooke; Elijah Wells; Lionel Bermingham	3:31
15.	"Straight Up"	S. Henriques; Dwayne Chin-Quee	Dwayne "Supa Dups" Chin-Quee	3:06
16.	"All on Me" (featuring Tami Chynn)	S. Henriques; Tammar Chin; J. Henriques	Jason Henriques	4:18
17.	"Change the Game" (featuring Looga Man and Kid Kurup)	S. Henriques; J. Henriques; Ayun Daley; Javan Rodney	Jason Henriques	3:54
18.	"The Trinity"	S. Henriques; Jarrett; Edmund	Michael "Factor" Jarrett	3:35
Total length:				62:18

Japanese edition bonus track
No.	Title	Length
19.	"Feel Alright"	3:05

Japanese special edition bonus tracks
No.	Title	Writer(s)	Producer(s)	Length
19.	"Feel Alright"			3:05
20.	"Cry Baby Cry" (Carlos Santana featuring Sean Paul and Joss Stone)	Lester Mendez; S. Henriques; Kara DioGuardi; Jimmy Harry	Lester Mendez	3:52
21.	"Break It Off" (with Rihanna)	S. Henriques; Bennett; Kirk Ford; Robyn Fenty	Donovan "Vendetta" Bennett	3:35

Special edition bonus disc
No.	Title	Writer(s)	Producer(s)	Length
1.	"Cry Baby Cry" (featuring Carlos Santana and Joss Stone)	Mendez; S. Henriques; DioGuardi; Harry	Lester Mendez	3:52
2.	"Break It Off" (featuring Rihanna)	S. Henriques; Bennett; Ford; Fenty	Donovan "Vendetta" Bennett	3:35
3.	"As Time Goes On"	S. Henriques; Rupert Bent Jr.	Rupert Bent Jr.	4:54
4.	"Temperature" (AOL Sessions)	S. Henriques; Marshall; Fuller		2:49
5.	"Get Busy" (AOL Sessions)	S. Henriques; Marsden		2:47
6.	"Never Gonna Be the Same" (AOL Sessions)	S. Henriques; Bennett; Staff		3:32

Notes

- ^{^[a]} signifies an additional producer

== Charts ==
=== Weekly charts ===
Weekly chart performance for The Trinity
Chart (2005–2006)	Peak position
Australian Albums (ARIA)	100
Austrian Albums (Ö3 Austria)	6
Belgian Albums (Ultratop Flanders)	4
Belgian Albums (Ultratop Wallonia)	9
Canadian Albums (Billboard)	4
Danish Albums (Hitlisten)	11
Dutch Albums (Album Top 100)	13
French Albums (SNEP)	5
German Albums (Offizielle Top 100)	9
Hungarian Albums (MAHASZ)	34
Irish Albums (IRMA)	25
Italian Albums (FIMI)	8
Japanese Albums (Oricon)	8
Norwegian Albums (VG-lista)	36
Scottish Albums (OCC)	40
Spanish Albums (Promusicae)	73
Swedish Albums (Sverigetopplistan)	40
Swiss Albums (Schweizer Hitparade)	4
UK Albums (OCC)	11
US Billboard 200	5
US Top R&B/Hip-Hop Albums (Billboard)	4
US Top Rap Albums (Billboard)	3
US Reggae Albums (Billboard)	1

=== Year-end charts ===
2005 year-end chart performance for The Trinity
Chart (2005)	Position
Belgian Albums (Ultratop Wallonia)	49
French Albums (SNEP)	63
Swiss Albums (Schweizer Hitparade)	74
UK Albums (OCC)	141
US Top R&B/Hip-Hop Albums (Billboard)	96

2006 year-end chart performance for The Trinity
Chart (2006)	Position
Australian Urban Albums (ARIA)	50
Belgian Albums (Ultratop Flanders)	25
Dutch Albums (Album Top 100)	72
French Albums (SNEP)	25
Swiss Albums (Schweizer Hitparade)	62
US Billboard 200	60
US Top R&B/Hip-Hop Albums (Billboard)	27

== Certifications ==
Certifications for The Trinity
Region	Certification	Certified units/sales
Belgium (BRMA)	Gold	25,000^{*}
Canada (Music Canada)	Platinum	100,000^{^}
France (SNEP)	2× Platinum	400,000^{*}
Germany (BVMI)	Gold	100,000^{^}
Ireland (IRMA)	Gold	7,500^{^}
Japan (RIAJ)	Platinum	250,000^{^}
Switzerland (IFPI Switzerland)	Gold	20,000^{^}
United Kingdom (BPI)	Platinum	300,000^{‡}
United States (RIAA)	2× Platinum	2,000,000^{‡}
Summaries
Europe (IFPI)	Platinum	1,000,000^{*}
^{*} Sales figures based on certification alone.^{^} Shipments figures based on certification alone.^{‡} Sales+streaming figures based on certification alone.
