= Dying (disambiguation) =

Dying is the experience of death.

Dying may also refer to:

- Dying (1976 film), a documentary by Michael Roemer about death
- Dying (2017 film), a Spanish drama film
- Dying (2024 film), a German drama film
- "Dying", a song by Five for Fighting from The Battle for Everything
- "Dying", a song by Hole from Celebrity Skin
- "Dying", a song by Mavado from Gangsta for Life: The Symphony of David Brooks
- "Dying", a song by Obituary from Cause of Death
- "Dying", a song by Stone Sour from Audio Secrecy
- "Dying", a song by XTC from Skylarking
- "Dying", a song by the Drums from Jonny
- "Dying - I Only Feel Apathy", a song by Theatre of Tragedy from Theatre of Tragedy

== See also ==
- Dyeing, the process of coloring cloth and clothing
- Die (disambiguation)
