= Elan Atias =

- Also known as: Elan
- Born: September 21, 1975 (age 50)
- Origin: Los Angeles, California, United States
- Genres: Singer-Songwriter, Reggae, Rock, Pop, House
- Occupation: Singer-songwriter
- Years active: 1997–present
- Labels: Interscope, London, 1Lion, Kingsbury
- Formerly of: The Wailers
- Website: ElanMusic.com

Elan Atias (born September 21, 1975) is an American singer-songwriter, reggae singer.

== Career ==
Atias performed with The Wailers, which had been the backing band for Bob Marley, on and off from 1997 to 2010. He was signed to London Records under the WMG umbrella in January 2000. He was featured on the Sex and the City soundtrack with his song "Dreams Come True" In 2004 he teamed with Gwen Stefani on a song for the 50 First Dates soundtrack called "Slave to Love". Stefani had Elan feature on her remix of her number one single "Hollaback Girl" called "DanceHollaback", produced by Tony Kanal. In 2005, teamed up with Algerian Rai singer Cheb Khaled and Carlos Santana on a song called "Love to the People" for Khaled's album titled Ya Rayi. A tour of North America followed with an All Star line-up with the likes of K.C. Porter, Don Was, Walfredo Reyes Jr and Carlos Santana. In June 2006, he released his debut album, Together as One, produced by No Doubt bassist Tony Kanal, and featuring contributions from Stefani, Tami Chynn, Sly & Robbie, and Cutty Ranks, which reached number seven on the Billboard Top Reggae Albums chart. Elan recently reunited with The Wailers as the lead singer and is touring the world singing the Wailers' classics as well as songs from his Together as One album. Atias' new project in 2010 had him singing lead vocals for Zadik, a reggae band that incorporates traditional Jewish prayers.

== Discography ==
=== Albums ===
- Together as One (2006)
- Zadik (2010) with Zadik
- We Are (2011)

=== Singles ===
- "Red Red Wine" (2000)
- "Put It On" (2000)
- "Dreams Come True" (2001)
- "I'm In Love With You Girl"(2001)
- "Slave To Love" (2004)
- "Love to the People" (2005)
- "DanceHollaBack" (2006)
- "Girl" (2006)
- "The Way" (2009)
- "Be Free" (2009)
- "Shehechyanu" (2010)
- "Step into the Sunshine" (2011)
- ”Come together- Asere Que Bola” (2022) featuring Cheb Khaled

=== Compilation appearances ===
- Riddim Driven: Buy Out (2000), VP: "Red, Red Wine"
- Riddim Driven: Buy Out (2000), VP: "Put It On"
- Strictly The Best Vol.28 (2000), VP: "Red, Red Wine"
- Sex and the City: Music from the HBO Series (2001), Sire: "Dreams Come True"
- 50 First Dates soundtrack (2004): "Slave to Love"
- Buy Out Riddim (2015), DubShot Records / K-Licious Music: "Red, Red Wine"
- Buy Out Riddim (2015), DubShot Records / K-Licious Music: "Put It On"

=== Guest appearances ===
- Khaled – Ya-Rayi (US Edition) (2005), Universal/Wrasse: "Love to the People"
- Junior Caldera – Debut (2009), Universal: "The Way", "Be Free"
- Snoop Lion – Reincarnated (2013), Berhane Sound System/Mad Decent/Vice/RCA: "Get Away" ft. Angela Hunte
- Kenny Chesney – Life on a Rock (2013), Blue Chair/Columbia: "Spread the Love" ft. The Wailers
- Megalodon & 12th Planet – Light Up (2015)
