= Mr. Brooks...A Better Tomorrow =

Studio album by Mavado
- Released: 3 March 2009
- Recorded: 2008–2009
- Genre: Dancehall, reggae
- Length: 61:59
- Label: VP Records
- Producer: DASECA Productions, Stephen "Di Genius" McGregor, Linton "TJ" White, Trevor "Baby G" James, Dudley'Grincha' Excell, Shane Brown, Lloyd "John John" James Jr

Mavado chronology
Gangsta for Life: The Symphony of David Brooks (2007)	Mr. Brooks...A Better Tomorrow (2009)

Professional ratings
Review scores
Source	Rating
Allmusic	3.5/5 stars
Rolling Stone	3/5 stars
Spin	4/5 stars

Mr. Brooks...A Better Tomorrow is the second studio album by Jamaican dancehall artist Mavado, released on 3 March 2009. The album was recorded between 2008 and 2009 and features tracks such as "So Special", "Overcome", "So Blessed", "On The Rock", and "Money Changer". The album had no featured artists, unlike his previous album, Gangsta for Life: The Symphony of David Brooks, which was released in 2007.

== Track listing ==
#	Title	Producer(s)	Featured Guest(s)	Time	Riddim Man
1.	"David's Psalm"	JonFX/Neil "Diamond" Edwards	Dudley 'Grincha' Excell/Neil "Diamond" Edwards/ Yanique Sasha	1:24	
2.	"Every Situation"	DASECA Productions		4:11	
3.	"On the Rock"	Trevor "Baby G" James		3:34	Mission
4.	"So Blessed"	Stephen "Di Genius" McGregor		3:44	So Blessed
5.	"So Special"	Linton "TJ" White		3:00	Unfinished Business
6.	"Life of a G"	Lloyd "John John" James Jr		2:47	Shoot Out
7.	"Welcome to the Armagedeon"	John JonFX Crawford	Dudley 'Grincha' Excell / Yanique Sasha	2:41	
8.	"Gangster Don't Play"	Linton "TJ" White		3:31	Beauty & the Beast
9.	"Real Killer (No Chorus)"	Stephen "Di Genius" McGregor		2:46	Day Rave
10.	"Chiney K"	Stephen "Di Genius" McGregor		2:53	Chiney K
11.	"Jailhouse"	Stephen "Di Genius" McGregor		3:37	
12.	"Don't Worry"	DASECA Productions		3:56	
13.	"Money Changer"	Shane Brown		3:26	Final Warning
14.	"Money"	Stephen "Di Genius" McGregor		3:22	Advocate
15.	"In di Car Back"	Stephen "Di Genius" McGregor		3:06	Work Out
16.	"Which Gal"	Stephen "Di Genius" McGregor		2:52	Bee Hive
17.	"Overcome"	Stephen "Di Genius" McGregor		4:16	Brighter Day
