= Blak Ryno =

Jamaican dancehall musician

- Born: Romaine Odene Anderson; December 1984 (age 40–41); Portmore, Saint Catherine, Jamaica
- Origin: Jamaica
- Genres: Dancehall, Reggae
- Occupation: Singer
- Instrument: Vocals
- Years active: 2007

Romaine Odene Anderson (born December 1984 in Portmore, Jamaica), known professionally as Blak Ryno, is a Jamaican artist. He grew up in Waterford and attended at Bridgeport High School. He is also a past member of the Vybz Kartel Portmore Empire, he joined the Portmore Empire in January 2007. In 2010 Blak Ryno left the Portmore Empire due to an altercation with him and Vybz Kartel.

== Discography ==
- Bike Back (2010)
- Real Stingers (2009)
- Badmind (2009)
- Summer Wine (2012)
- Real Vybz (2013)
