= One out of many =

One out of many may refer to:

- E pluribus unum, a Latin phrase meaning "Out of many, one", "One out of many" or "One from many"
- "One out of Many" (story), a 1971 short story written by V.S. Naipaul

== See also ==
- E pluribus unum (disambiguation)
