= Vybz Kartel =

Jamaican dancehall deejay (born 1976)

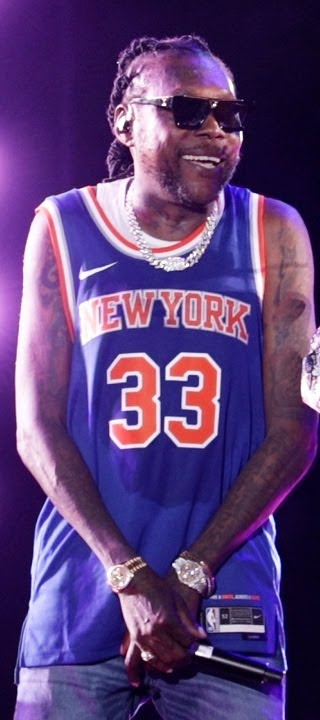
- Palmer in 2025

Background information
- Also known as: Addi; Worl' Boss; Teacha
- Born: Adidja Azim Palmer; 7 January 1976 (age 50); Kingston, Jamaica
- Genres: Dancehall; reggae
- Occupations: Deejay; singer; songwriter; entrepreneur; businessman
- Years active: 1993–present
- Labels: Adidjahiem Records; Vice; Mixpak; Greensleeves; Short Boss Muzik; Vybz Kartel Muzik

Adidja Azim Palmer (born 7 January 1976), better known as Vybz Kartel, is a Jamaican dancehall artist. Among his various nicknames, he is referred to as Worl' Boss, Teacha and King of Dancehall. As summarized by Rolling Stone, he "attained folk-hero status in Jamaica with provocative lyrics, and a mischievous public persona", and "few have captivated [the dancehall] audience – or offended the sensibilities of its detractors – as consistently and thoroughly as Kartel." He has also been credited as an inspiration for the dancehall-infused work of a number of Western artists, including Drake, who has cited Kartel as being one of his "biggest inspirations".

Kartel's singles include "Romping Shop" (2009), "Dancehall Hero" (2010), and "Summer Time" (2011). He has collaborated with a number of hip hop and R&B artists such as Major Lazer, Rihanna, Missy Elliott, Travis Scott and Alison Hinds.

In 2014, Kartel was sentenced to life imprisonment for the murder of his associate Clive "Lizard" Williams. Kartel often released new music despite his imprisonment, having released over 50 new songs in 2016 alone. His conviction was quashed in March 2024 by the UK Judicial Committee of the Privy Council, who cited juror misconduct and declared that the Jamaican Court of Appeal had to decide if a retrial would take place. On 31 July 2024, Kartel was released from prison after the Court of Appeal declined to retry the Williams case.

== Life and career ==
=== 1993–2008: Rise to prominence ===
Palmer started his career as a teenager in 1993 with his first recording "Love Fat Woman", which he released on Alvin Reid's label "One Heart" using the moniker "Adi Banton", an homage to Buju Banton. Palmer was later part of the three-member group "Vybz Kartel", keeping the name for himself after the group split up. While still a member of the group, he claims to have written nearly 30 songs, including "Gal Clown". He eventually became a protege of Bounty Killer.

Kartel rose to prominence in 2003 after having a string of hit songs in Jamaica. The year culminated in a pre-planned on-stage clash with Ninjaman at the annual dancehall festival Sting, held in Kartel's hometown of Portmore. The clash turned violent when Kartel's crew members, as well as Kartel himself, threw punches and assaulted Ninjaman onstage. While Kartel's manager initially blamed Ninjaman, Kartel himself quickly apologised to Ninjaman and festival organizers for the fracas. Four days after the incident, the two artists appeared before the press to announce a settlement of their differences and to end any animosity.

From the beginning through the midst of his ongoing career, Kartel released a number of albums through the UK-based label Greensleeves Records, such as Up 2 Di Time, More Up 2 Di Time, and J.M.T.. He established his own label, Adidjahiem/Notnice Records, with his business partner and producer Ainsley "Notnice" Morris. After splitting with Bounty Killer-led Alliance in 2006, Kartel joined the Portmore Empire, a group of dancehall DJs and singers from his Portmore neighbourhood that he signed to his newly founded Adidjahiem/Notnice Records. The members included Popcaan, Tommy Lee, Blak Ryno and Jah Vinci to name a few.

In 2008, Corey Todd, an American businessman, signed Vybz Kartel to an endorsement deal for Vybz Rum. The relationship between Todd and Kartel developed into a business partnership. Together they launched Daggerin Condom and Street Vybz Rum. Todd then purchased Jamaica's most popular dancehall nightclub, Asylum, which became the home to their weekly event called Street Vybz Thursday. Street Vybz Rum production was stopped in 2011 because of a disagreement between Kartel and Todd. However, the collaboration resumed in 2012 as the two settled their differences, and despite Kartel's ongoing incarceration.

==== Controversial lyrics ====
In 2004, Kartel's nomination for the UK MOBO Awards was withdrawn due to controversy surrounding the homophobic content of his lyrics. Six years later, he endorsed the Reggae Compassionate Act, a petition organized by the Peter Tatchell Foundation and LGBT advocacy groups to oppose homophobia in music.

As described by Rolling Stone, Kartel is "credited with helping to erode Jamaica's long-held taboo against oral sex by singing about blow jobs". In September 2011, the National Communications Network of Guyana banned Vybz Kartel from the airwaves—the first such action against a specific artist in Guyana. NCN spokesman Martin Goolsarran said his music contained "obscene lyrics" and brought "nothing positive" to the entertainment industry, on 21 September after a week of internal debate. He said NCN was reviewing the lyrics of other musicians and could ban them as well.

==== Feud with Mavado ====
A public feud between Kartel and former collaborator Mavado arose towards the end of 2006, stemming from Vybz's much-publicised departure from the dancehall conglomerate group The Alliance. The feud resulted in numerous diss tracks released, in which each artist dissed the other and their associates over popular dancehall rhythms. In a police-overseen press conference in March 2007, both Mavado and Vybz Kartel publicly announced an end to hostilities and apologized to fans. However, by the summer of 2008, tensions flared with a renewal of "diss tracks" from each artist, and a lyrical clash between the two at Sting 2008 left mixed views as to the "winner".

Most of 2009 saw a continuation of the public feud, which dominated Jamaican media and, to a certain extent, Jamaican culture, with the two artists' factions, Gaza (Kartel) and Gully (Mavado), being adopted by Jamaican youth, in some cases leading to street violence. On 8 December 2009, Kartel and Mavado met with Jamaican Prime Minister Bruce Golding in an attempt to end the feud, which had by that time fueled mob attacks in some of the inner-city neighbourhoods of Kingston. The two had performed together on-stage the previous night in a sign of goodwill at the West Kingston Jamboree, a concert promoted by drug lord Christopher "Dudus" Coke. After the truce in December 2009, the two artists were scheduled to perform an unity concert in March 2010 in Barbados, which was later cancelled by Barbadian Prime Minister David Thompson.

=== 2009–2013: Crossover and imprisonment ===
In 2009, his song featuring Jamaica's "Queen of Dancehall" Spice, "Romping Shop", debuted on the Billboard Hot 100 Singles chart, and "Dollar Sign" was in regular rotation on urban radio stations in the US. His 2010 single "Clarks" was one of his biggest international successes, remaining in the top three reggae singles and gaining the most radio plays in North America for 40 weeks. "Clarks" was also featured on the TV series So You Think You Can Dance Canada, and on a CNN segment on dancehall dance. When his singles "Clarks", "Clarks 2 (Clarks Again)" and "Clarks 3 (Wear Weh Yuh Have)" were released in 2010, its sales numbers and prices in Jamaica increased considerably. In 2011, he released his own shoe line, named Addi's, as well as his own line of "cake soap", a type of soap primarily used for clothes. Cake soap is less commonly utilised for skincare, to treat skin conditions such as acne. However, Kartel's brand was intended for the purpose of skin lightening or bleaching.

MTV's Vice Guide to Dancehall featured Kartel at his weekly dance party, Street Vybz Thursday. Vybz Kartel has also hosted his own reality television show "Teacha's Pet" on CVM Jamaica broadcast channel, the first reality television show hosted by a dancehall artist in Jamaica. The premise of "Teacha's Pet" found 20 women living in a Kingston house vying for the artist's affection; the show's lascivious content elicited condemnation of its sponsor, telecommunications company LIME. The show came to a halt with the artist's arrest on murder charges in September 2011.

==== Murder conviction ====
On 29 September 2011, Kartel was arrested by police for cannabis possession. Jamaica's Major Investigation Taskforce (MIT) later charged him with the murder of Jamaican businessman Barrington Burton, conspiracy and illegal possession of a firearm. While in prison in 2012, his book The Voice Of The Jamaican Ghetto: Incarcerated but not Silenced, co-written with business associate Michael Dawson, was published.

Though Kartel was granted bail for the Burton murder on 23 March 2012, for JMD$3,000,000, he remained in prison in connection with a second murder, of Clive 'Lizard' Williams, of Waterford, St Catherine. Kartel and his associates Vanessa "Gaza Slim" Saddler and Andre ‘Pim-Pim’ Henry were charged with perverting the course of justice after Saddler allegedly claimed that Williams had robbed her in order to mislead the police into believing that he was still alive. Kartel's trial was originally scheduled for 21 January 2013, but had to be postponed due to a lack of jurors, and was rescheduled for 11 July.

On 24 July, a jury found Kartel not guilty of the charge of murder of Barrington Burton. However, Kartel remained in custody pending the second murder case. His trial for the murder of Clive Williams started on 18 November 2013, and on 13 March 2014, he was found guilty by an eleven-member jury (10-1) of the murder of 27-year-old Clive ‘Lizard’ Williams. The 65-day trial was one of the longest in Jamaica's history. On 3 April 2014, Kartel was sentenced to life imprisonment. Justice Lennox Campbell said he would be eligible for parole after serving 35 years.

=== 2014–2026: Music and release ===
Despite his incarceration in 2011, Vybz Kartel released new music prolifically. Jamaican prison officials denied allowing him recording privileges and Kartel refused to state the exact source of the recordings, despite the lyrical content including current events.

In 2016, while in prison, Kartel released his most internationally successful album, King of the Dancehall, which peaked at number 2 on the US Billboard Reggae Chart. The album included the single "Fever" which topped various local music charts and became his most successful on streaming websites. "Fever" was certified gold in 2020.

In January 2020, Kartel released a 10-track album, To Tanesha, which was dedicated to his ex-wife and mother of his three children, Tanesha Johnson. They co-produced the album with their respective record labels: Short Boss Muzik and Vybz Kartel Muzik. On 26 June 2020, Kartel released his fifteenth studio album, Of Dons & Divas.

In April 2020, a three-member panel of judges in the Jamaican Court of Appeal reaffirmed Kartel's conviction. On 17 April 2020, the Court of Appeal reduced Kartel's parole eligibility to 32 years and 6 months, citing Justice Campbell's failure to consider time the singer had spent in jail while awaiting trial in 2014.

On 14 March 2024, Kartel's conviction was quashed by the UK Privy Council due to juror misconduct, requiring the Jamaica Court of Appeal to decide if a retrial would take place. On 31 July 2024, Kartel, along with Shawn ‘Shawn Storm’ Campbell, Kahira Jones, and Andre St. John were freed after the Jamaica Court of Appeal declined to retry the case, citing expense, passage of time, and Kartel's declining health among the reasons.

Vybz Kartel's album Party With Me received a 2025 Grammy Awards nomination for Best Reggae Album.

In July 2026, Vybz Kartel's 2016 single "Fever" was certified Gold by the British Phonographic Industry (BPI), recognizing more than 400,000 combined sales and streams in the United Kingdom. The song, produced by TJ Records and featured on his album King of the Dancehall, became Kartel's first Gold-certified single in the UK after previously receiving a Silver certification in 2023.

== Personal life ==
Vybz Kartel's first child was born on 18 April 2003, when he was 27 years old. He subsequently had two other children with the child’s mother, his longtime girlfriend Tanesha 'Shorty' Johnson. Kartel also has four more children from other relationships. On 17 May 2020, it was revealed that Kartel's 15-year-old son was expecting a child with an 18-year-old girl, making Vybz a grandfather for the first time.

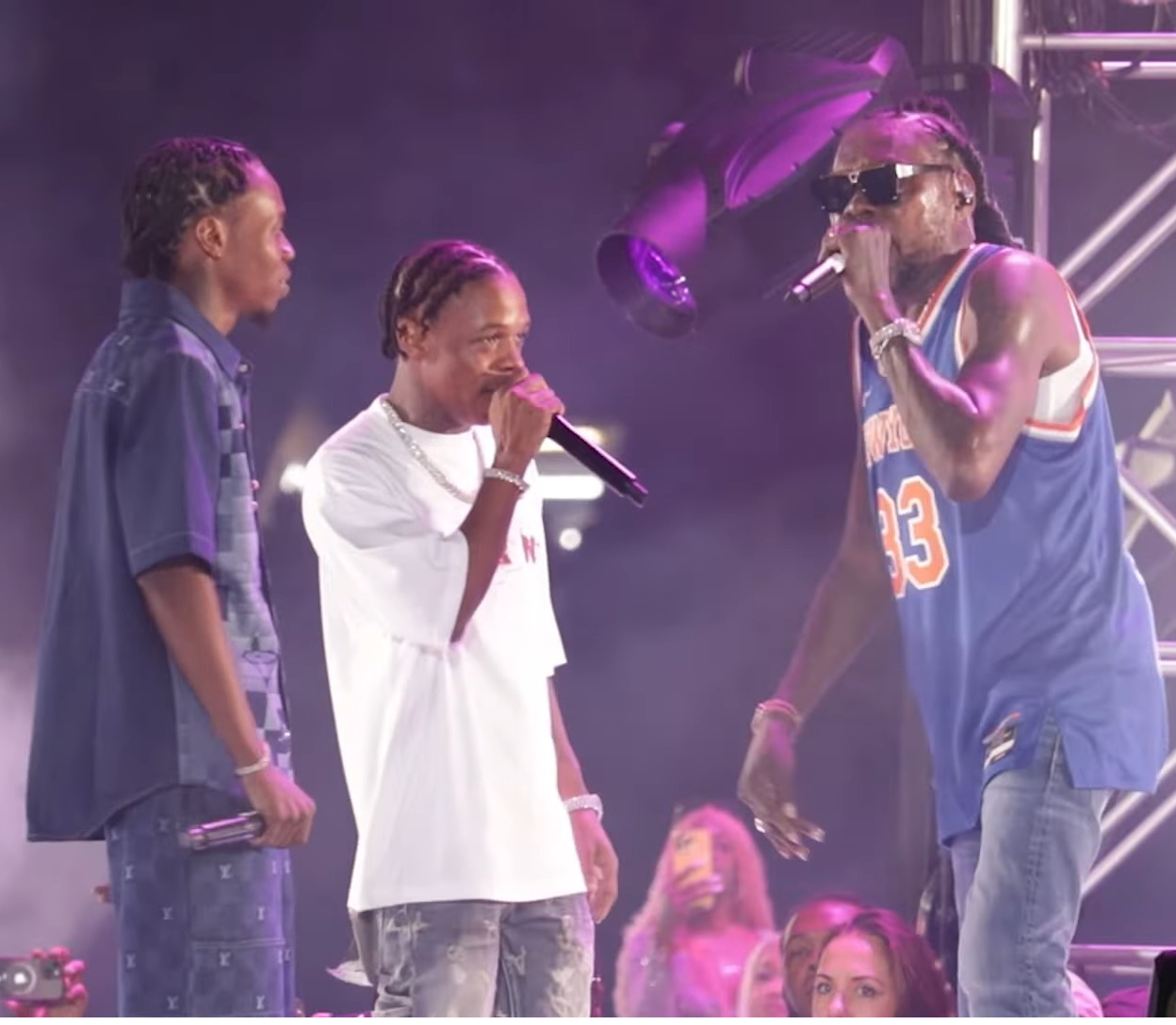
Vybz Kartel with his sons 'Likkle Vybz' and 'Likkle Addi' at 'Freedom Street' concert

Two of his seven children have continued his musical legacy as sons Jaheim, also known as Likkle Vybz, and Akheel Raheim Palmer, also known as Likkle Addi, have been releasing music since 2014, originally known as “PG 13” (also known as “Kartel Sons”), then later rebranded as “UTG” (Uptown Gaza/Greatness). In 2019, both were featured on the "Fully Gaza" riddim on separate songs, with Likkle Vybz teaming with father Vybz Kartel on the title track "Fully Gaza", while Likkle Addi performs solo on "Dolla Sign", which interpolates portions of the chorus from his father's single of the same name, on the Goodlife riddim, from 2009.

Since 2016, Kartel has been living with Graves' disease and a heart condition. He faced health problems while in prison, including a thyroid issue.

Kartel is engaged to Sidem Öztürk, a Social Worker from London, England, United Kingdom. The couple first met in 2015 while Kartel was serving time following a murder conviction. In August 2024, they launched a YouTube channel titled "Kiss Me Baby."

== Reception ==
Donna Hope, a professor at the University of the West Indies and an expert on dancehall music, gender identity, and pop culture, has stated that "Jamaicans have differing opinions on Kartel, but he has a huge fan base of Jamaicans as well as non-Jamaicans." She attributed his enduring popularity to his ability to challenge societal norms, citing his 2010 presentation at the University of the West Indies. During the event, he openly addressed the controversial practice of skin-lightening, tied to colorism and Jamaica’s colonial history, and asserted that it was not motivated by self-hate or racism.

== Philanthropy ==
In November 2025, Vybz Kartel started "The Adidja Palmer foundation" in order to provide emergency relief to the communities which were affected by Hurricane Melissa in Jamaica.

== Awards ==
- 2003
  - Stone Love's 30th Anniversary
    - DJ of the Year 2005
- 2008
  - CUMA (Caribbean Urban Music Awards)
- 2009
  - EME Awards
    - Male DJ of the Year
    - Lyricist/Songwriter of the Year
    - Song of the Year (Romping Shop ft. Spice)
- 2010
  - EME Awards
- 2023
  - Artist of the Decade

Mobo 2025 and 2026 winner

=== Nominations ===
- 2025 GRAMMY nomination for Best Reggae Album (Party With Me EP)
- Source
- VIBE
- UK MOBO awards

== Discography ==
=== Albums ===
Title	Album details	Peak chart positions
Title	Album details	US Reggae
Up 2 Di Time	Released: 28 October 2003; Label: Greensleeves; Format: CD, digital	–
Timeless	Released: 23 February 2004; Label: Freedom Sounds; Format: CD, digital download	
More Up 2 Di Time	Released: 14 September 2004; Label: Greensleeves; Format: CD, digital download	–
J.M.T.	Released: 15 November 2005; Label: Greensleeves; Format: CD, digital download	–
The Teacher's Back	Released: 18 November 2008; Label: JVC/Victor; Format: CD, digital download	–
Most Wanted	Released: 26 May 2009; Label: Greensleeves; Format: CD, digital download	–
Pon Di Gaza 2.0	Released: 26 February 2010; Label: Adidjahiem/Notnice/Tad's; Format: CD, digital download	–
Kingston Story (with Dre Skull)	Released: 14 August 2011; Label: Mixpak; Format: CD, digital download, LP	7
The Voice of the Jamaican Ghetto - Incarcerated But Not Silenced	Released: 7 July 2013; Label: Whirlwind; Format: CD, digital download	6
Kartel Forever: Trilogy	Released: 15 October 2013; Label: Tad's Record Inc.; Format: CD, digital download	11
Reggae Love Songs	Released: 3 June 2014; Label: Tad's Record Inc.; Format: CD, digital download	-
Viking (Vybz Is King)	Released: 13 January 2015; Label: TJ Records/Adidjahiem Records/21st Hapilos Digital Distribution; Format: Digital download	3
King of the Dancehall	Released: 10 June 2016; Label: Adidjahiem Records/TJ Records/Zojak World Wide; Format: CD, digital download	-
Black & White	Released: 10 March 2017; Label: H2O Records - Jwonder 21	-
Remember Me	Released: 7 April 2017; Label: CR203 Records	-
Vybz Kartel Selects Reggae Dancehall	Released: 14 April 2017; Label: PMI Jet Star	-
Party	Released: 19 May 2017; Label: Tad's Record Inc.	-
Clarks: De Mixtape	Released: 3 November 2017; Label: Tad's Record Inc.	2
To Tanesha	Released: 10 January 2020; Label: Short Boss Musik/Vybz Kartel Muzik; Format: Digital download	-
Of Dons & Divas	Released: 26 June 2020; Label: Short Boss Muzik/Vybz Kartel Muzik; Format: Digital download	-
X-Rated	Released: 19 March 2021; Label: Short Boss Muzik / Vybz Kartel Muzik	6
Born Fi Dis (Prelude)	Released: 6 August 2021; Label: Aiko Pon Di Beat/Short Boss Musik/Vybz Kartel Muzik; Format: Digital download	-
Dancehall Generals	Released: 24 March 2023; Label: Reggae Library	-
First Week Out	Released: 31 July 2024; Label: 21st Hapilos Compilations	-
Viking (Vybz is King) 10th Year Anniversary	Released: 31 January 2025; Label: TJ Records	-
Heart & Soul	Released: 29 August 2025; Label: Vybz Kartel Musik	-
God & Time	Released: 5 June 2026; Label: TJ Records, Vybz Kartel Musik	-
"–" indicates album did not chart or was not released in the country.

=== Extended plays ===
- 2009: GAZA
- 2010: Raw - EP
- 2011: The Gaza Don
- 2011: Colouring Book
- 2012: Stronger We Get
- 2012: Amsterdam
- 2012: Mentally Free
- 2013: Time To Be Free
- 2021: X-Rated
- 2022: True Religion
- 2023: Numb
- 2024: Party With Me

=== Mixtapes ===
- 2024: First Week Out

=== Riddim Albums ===
Vybz Kartel has featured on more than 900 riddims/rhythms from various producers worldwide throughout his career.

=== Singles ===
List of singles, with selected chart positions
Title	Year	Peak chart positions	Certifications	Album
Title	Year	US R&B	Certifications	Album
"Tekk Buddy"	2004	111		More Up 2 Di Time
"Picture This"	2004	121		More Up 2 Di Time
"Ramping Shop" (featuring Spice)	2009	76		Pon di Gaza 2.0
"Life Sweet"	2009	–		Pon di Gaza 2.0
"Go Fi Dem Anyweh"	2009	–		Pon di Gaza 2.0
"Last Man Standing"	2009	–		Pon di Gaza 2.0
"Clarks Again"	2010	–		Singles-only
"Know Bout Me"	2010	–		Singles-only
"Like Xmas"	2010	–		Singles-only
"All Out"	2011	–		Singles-only
"Step Up Inna Life"	2011	–		Singles-only
"Tell You Say"	2011	–		Singles-only
"Sex & the City"	2011	–		Singles-only
"Slew Dem Like David"	2011	–		Singles-only
"Go Go Wine"	2011	–		Kingston Story
"Yuh Love"	2011	–		Kingston Story
"Summertime"	2011	–		Colouring Book
"Party Me Say (Me Nice)"	2012	–		Mentally Free
"Reparation" (featuring Gaza Slim)	2012	–		Mentally Free
"Street Vybz Girl"	2012	–		Mentally Free
"Good Father" / "Mi Sorry"	2012	–		Singles-only
"Right Now" (featuring Stylish)	2012	–		Singles-only
"Dweet We a Dweet (Do It)"	2012	–		Singles-only
"Lip Gloss (Cover Girl)"	2012	–		Singles-only
"The Cure (Fi Badmind)" (featuring Rvssian)	2012	–		Singles-only
"Looking Glass"	2012	–		Singles-only
"Party Vibes"	2012	–		Singles-only
"Informer" (featuring Tommy Lee)	2012	–		Singles-only
"Betray Di Gaza Boss" (featuring Tommy Lee)	2012	–		Unstoppable
"Daddy Devil"	2012	–		Gaza Man Crazy
"Love U Baby"	2013	–		Unstoppable
"Back to Life"	2013	–		Kartel Forever Trilogy
"Look Pon We"	2013	–		Kartel Forever Trilogy
"Ghetto Life"	2013	–		Kartel Forever Trilogy
"Summer Time"	2013	–		Kartel Forever Trilogy
"Bubble Hard"	2013	–		Kartel Forever Trilogy
"Me a Pree"	2013	–		Kartel Forever Trilogy
"Dancehall Hero"	2013	–		Kartel Forever Trilogy
"Badman Sittin"	2013	–		Single only
"Wickedest Ride" (with Gaza Slim)	2014	—		Duet
"Make Up"	2014	—		Reggae Love Songs
"Fever"	2016	–	BPI: Gold; RIAA: Gold	King of the Dancehall
"Can't Be the Same" (featuring Squash)	2019	–		Single only
"—" denotes a title that did not chart, or was not released in that territory.

==== As featured artist ====
List of singles, with selected chart positions
Title	Year	Peak chart positions		Certifications	Album
Title	Year	US Reggae Digital	UK	Certifications	Album
"Been Around the World" (Zena featuring Vybz Kartel)	2003	–	44		Non-album single
"Pon de Floor" (Major Lazer and Afrojack featuring Vybz Kartel)	2010	7	–	BPI: Silver	Guns Don't Kill People... Lazers Do
"No Roof" (Kalash featuring Vybz Kartel)	2017	–	–		Mwaka Moon
"Girlfriend" (Busta Rhymes featuring Vybz Kartel and Tory Lanez)	2017	–	–		Non-album single
"Royalty" (XXXTentacion featuring Ky-Mani Marley, Stefflon Don, and Vybz Kartel)	2019	–	–		Bad Vibes Forever
"—" denotes a title that did not chart, or was not released in that territory..

=== Guest appearances ===
Year	Title	Album	Artist
2005	"You Don't Love Me (No, No, No)" (featuring Vybz Kartel)	Music of the Sun	Rihanna
2005	"Bad Man" (featuring Vybz Kartel and M.I.A.)	The Cookbook	Missy Elliott
2006	"Descarada (Dance)" (featuring Vybz Kartel)	El Mariel	Pitbull
2007	"Colors 2007" (Reggae Remix) (featuring Vybz Kartel and Kardinal Offishall)	Sean Kingston	Sean Kingston
2009	"Herbs Promotion" (featuring Demarco and Vybz Kartel)	Contagious	Tarrus Riley
2009	"Pon De Floor" (featuring Vybz Kartel)	Guns Don't Kill People... Lazers Do	Major Lazer
2012	"Wine & Go Down" (featuring Vybz Kartel)	Year of the Dragon	Busta Rhymes
2017	"No Roof" (featuring Vybz Kartel)	Mwaka Moon	Kalash
2025	"PBT" (featuring Vybz Kartel and Tyla)	JackBoys 2	Travis Scott
2026	"Fuck and Party" (featuring Vybz Kartel)	Brown	Chris Brown
