= Kingston Bridal Week =

Coordinates: 18.0106°N 76.7986°W

- Formation: 2011
- Type: Bridal Fair
- Headquarters: Kingston, Jamaica
- Location: Jamaica
- Official language: English
- Website: Official website

Kingston Bridal Week is Jamaica's first and only annual Bridal Week. The event was founded in 2012 by Kibwe McGann, Sean Lyn and Kara-Ann Anderson, and was produced by Intuit Concepts. In the second year, Nicola Barbar of Phoenix printery became an official partner and was added to the directorship. In September 2013, for the second staging of Kingston Bridal Week, and for the first time in Jamaica, Kingston Bridal Week hosted Randy Fenoli, TV star of TLC 's Say Yes To The Dress and Randy to the Rescue and author of It's all About the Dress.

As part of Kingston Bridal Week's Lifestyle and Honeymoon fashion shows, the event has featured international designers Rebacca Ansah (UK), Kesia Eastwick (Barbados), Cedella Marley (Jamaica), Spokes Apparel, Roger Gary (Guyana), and Lubica (Slovakia).

Kingston Bridal Week has hosted three charity events as part of annual bridal week: In 2012 - a charity dinner in partnership with Angels of Love, A Jamaican charity for children was hosted by international recording artist Tami Chynn, sister of Jamaican singer Tessanne Chin; Brides for Haiti, charity dress drive; and Baggage Claim charity movie premiere.

== Intuit Concepts ==
Intuit Concepts is the management and execution company that conceptualized Kingston Bridal Week. The company also produces Wedding Spectacular a two-day annual bridal event held in February which is also hosted in Jamaica.
