= Ever Blazin' =

Single by Sean Paul

from the album The Trinity
- Released: 21 November 2005
- Recorded: 2002
- Length: 3:05
- Label: Atlantic, VP
- Songwriters: Sean Henrique, Steven Marsden
- Producer: Steven "Lenky" Marsden

Sean Paul singles chronology
"We Be Burnin'" (2005)	"Ever Blazin'" (2005)	"Temperature" (2005)

"Ever Blazin'" is the second international single from Jamaican rapper Sean Paul's third studio album, The Trinity (2005).

== Release and reception ==
Originally, "Ever Blazin'" was recorded and released in 2002 as "Ever Blazing" on the compilation album Greensleeves Rhythm Album #34: Masterpiece. Later in 2005, Atlantic Records re-released the recording and re-recorded it over a new remaster, and released on The Trinity album.

"Ever Blazin'" was released in the USA on 21 November 2005 and in UK on 28 November 2005 as the second single from The Trinity. In France, it was the first single from the album to chart. The track re-united Sean Paul with award-winning producer Steven 'Lenky' Marsden, who produced "Get Busy". Lenky's 'Masterpiece' riddim provided the backdrop for Sean to testify about a "never ending" love.

"Ever Blazin'" had its highest peak in France, No. 8. However, in the UK, it became his first solo single to miss the top 10 since the first release of "Gimme the Light" made No. 32 in 2002. This could be attributed, perhaps to the fact the song was relatively a few years old compared to other tracks on the album. Despite spending two months inside the top 75, it remained his lowest chart peak there until July 2006 when "Never Gonna Be the Same" failed to make the top 20.

== Track listings ==
UK - CD: 1

1. "Ever Blazin'"
2. "Get with It Girl" (Non-Album Track)

UK - CD: 2

1. "Ever Blazin'"
2. "Get with It Girl" (Non-Album Track)
3. "Feel Alright" (Non-Album Track)
4. "Ever Blazin'" (Video)
5. Ringtone

== Charts ==
=== Weekly charts ===
Weekly chart performance for "Ever Blazin'"
Chart (2005–2006)	Peak position
Austria (Ö3 Austria Top 40)	25
Belgium (Ultratop 50 Flanders)	30
Belgium (Ultratop 50 Wallonia)	11
CIS Airplay (TopHit)	28
Czech Republic Airplay (ČNS IFPI)	25
France (SNEP)	8
Germany (GfK)	20
Hungary (Editors' Choice Top 40)	26
Ireland (IRMA)	16
Netherlands (Dutch Top 40)	22
Netherlands (Single Top 100)	22
Russia Airplay (TopHit)	26
Scottish Singles Sales (Official Charts)	18
Sweden (Sverigetopplistan)	17
Switzerland (Schweizer Hitparade)	11
UK Singles (Official Charts)	12

=== Year-end charts ===
Year-end chart rankings for "Ever Blazin'"
Chart	Position
Belgium (Ultratop 50 Wallonia, 2006)	98
CIS Airplay (TopHit, 2006)	119
France (SNEP, 2006)	83
Netherlands (Dutch Top 40, 2006)	184
Russia Airplay (TopHit, 2006)	106
UK Singles (OCC, 2005)	166
