= Sex and the City: Music from the HBO Series =

Soundtrack album by various artists
- Released: June 6, 2000
- Length: 52:59
- Label: Sire
- Producer: Darren Star; Seymour Stein; Steve Greenberg

Sex and the City chronology
Sex and the City: Music from the HBO Series (2000)	Sex and the City: Music from and Inspired by the TV Series (2004)

Sex and the City: Music from the HBO Series is the soundtrack to the HBO series Sex and the City. It was released on June 6, 2000, by Sire Records.

== Track listing ==
1. "Sexbomb" (Peppermint Jam Remix) – Tom Jones with Mousse T
2. "Taste the Tears" – Amber
3. "Righteous Love" – Joan Osborne
4. "Love TKO" – Bette Midler
5. "Count to 10" – Imani Coppola
6. "More, More, More" – The Dust Brothers
7. "Hot Boyz" – Missy "Misdemeanor" Elliott
8. "Got the Girl" – Reiss
9. "The Time Is Now" – Moloko
10. "Calling It Quits" – Aimee Mann
11. "Dreams Come True" – Elan Atias
12. "For Only You" – Trisha Yearwood
13. "Sex and the City Theme" – Groove Armada
