= List of European number-one hits of 2006 =

This is a list of the European Hot 100 Singles and European Top 100 Albums number ones of 2006, as published by Billboard magazine.

== Chart history ==
Key
†	Indicates best-performing single and album of 2006

Issue date	Song	Artist	Album	Artist	Ref.
4 January	"Hung Up"	Madonna	Intensive Care	Robbie Williams	
11 January	"Hung Up"	Madonna	Confessions on a Dance Floor	Madonna	
18 January	"Hung Up"	Madonna	Back to Bedlam †	James Blunt	
25 January	"Hung Up"	Madonna	Back to Bedlam †	James Blunt	
1 February	"Hung Up"	Madonna	Back to Bedlam †	James Blunt	
8 February	"Run It!"	Chris Brown featuring Juelz Santana	Back to Bedlam †	James Blunt	
15 February	"Run It!"	Chris Brown featuring Juelz Santana	Back to Bedlam †	James Blunt	
22 February	"Nasty Girl"	The Notorious B.I.G. featuring Diddy, Nelly, Jagged Edge and Avery Storm	Back to Bedlam †	James Blunt	
1 March	"Sorry"	Madonna	Back to Bedlam †	James Blunt	
8 March	"Sorry"	Madonna	Back to Bedlam †	James Blunt	
15 March	"Sorry"	Madonna	On an Island	David Gilmour	
22 March	"Sorry"	Madonna	Meds	Placebo	
29 March	"So Sick"	Ne-Yo	Meds	Placebo	
5 April	"So Sick"	Ne-Yo	3121	Prince	
12 April	"Temperature"	Sean Paul	I'm Not Dead	Pink	
19 April	"Because of You"	Kelly Clarkson	I'm Not Dead	Pink	
26 April	"SOS"	Rihanna	I'm Not Dead	Pink	
3 May	"SOS"	Rihanna	We Shall Overcome: The Seeger Sessions	Bruce Springsteen	
10 May	"SOS"	Rihanna	10,000 Days	Tool	
17 May	"Hips Don't Lie" †	Shakira featuring Wyclef Jean	Stadium Arcadium	Red Hot Chili Peppers	
24 May	"Hips Don't Lie" †	Shakira featuring Wyclef Jean	Stadium Arcadium	Red Hot Chili Peppers	
31 May	"Crazy"	Gnarls Barkley	Stadium Arcadium	Red Hot Chili Peppers	
7 June	"Hips Don't Lie" †	Shakira featuring Wyclef Jean	Stadium Arcadium	Red Hot Chili Peppers	
14 June	"Hips Don't Lie" †	Shakira featuring Wyclef Jean	Stadium Arcadium	Red Hot Chili Peppers	
21 June	"Hips Don't Lie" †	Shakira featuring Wyclef Jean	Under the Iron Sea	Keane	
28 June	"Hips Don't Lie" †	Shakira featuring Wyclef Jean	Under the Iron Sea	Keane	
5 July	"Hips Don't Lie" †	Shakira featuring Wyclef Jean	Under the Iron Sea	Keane	
12 July	"Hips Don't Lie" †	Shakira featuring Wyclef Jean	Black Holes and Revelations	Muse	
19 July	"Hips Don't Lie" †	Shakira featuring Wyclef Jean	Black Holes and Revelations	Muse	
26 July	"Hips Don't Lie" †	Shakira featuring Wyclef Jean	Black Holes and Revelations	Muse	
2 August	"Hips Don't Lie" †	Shakira featuring Wyclef Jean	Black Holes and Revelations	Muse	
9 August	"Hips Don't Lie" †	Shakira featuring Wyclef Jean	Stadium Arcadium	Red Hot Chili Peppers	
16 August	"Hips Don't Lie" †	Shakira featuring Wyclef Jean	Stadium Arcadium	Red Hot Chili Peppers	
23 August	"Hips Don't Lie" †	Shakira featuring Wyclef Jean	Back to Basics	Christina Aguilera	
30 August	"Hips Don't Lie" †	Shakira featuring Wyclef Jean	Back to Basics	Christina Aguilera	
6 September	"SexyBack"	Justin Timberlake	A Matter of Life and Death	Iron Maiden	
13 September	"SexyBack"	Justin Timberlake	Modern Times	Bob Dylan	
20 September	"SexyBack"	Justin Timberlake	FutureSex/LoveSounds	Justin Timberlake	
27 September	"SexyBack"	Justin Timberlake	FutureSex/LoveSounds	Justin Timberlake	
4 October	"I Don't Feel Like Dancin'"	Scissor Sisters	Ta-Dah	Scissor Sisters	
11 October	"I Don't Feel Like Dancin'"	Scissor Sisters	The Open Door	Evanescence	
18 October	"I Don't Feel Like Dancin'"	Scissor Sisters	The Open Door	Evanescence	
25 October	"I Don't Feel Like Dancin'"	Scissor Sisters	The Open Door	Evanescence	
1 November	"I Don't Feel Like Dancin'"	Scissor Sisters	Rudebox	Robbie Williams	
8 November	"I Don't Feel Like Dancin'"	Scissor Sisters	Rudebox	Robbie Williams	
15 November	"The Saints Are Coming"	U2 and Green Day	Rudebox	Robbie Williams	
22 November	"Smack That"	Akon featuring Eminem	Twenty Five	George Michael	
29 November	"Patience"	Take That	Love	The Beatles	
6 December	"Patience"	Take That	Love	The Beatles	
13 December	"Patience"	Take That	Love	The Beatles	
20 December	"Patience"	Take That	Love	The Beatles	
27 December	"Patience"	Take That	Love	The Beatles	
