= Out of Many...One =

Studio album by Tami Chynn
- Released: August 23, 2006
- Genre: Reggae; Reggaefusion
- Length: 46:30
- Label: Universal
- Producer: Tami Chynn, Kwame Kandekore (Executive Producer), Ty "Tyjae" Jackson, Neil Case, Nas|Esco (Producer, Mixing), Conroy Forte (Executive Producer), Supa Dups

Singles from Out of Many...One
- 1. "Hyperventilating/Looky Looky (Promo)" Released: February 14, 2006; 2. "Hyperventilating" Released: September 26, 2006; 3. "1,2,3,4" Released: August 1, 2006

Out of Many...One is the debut studio album by Jamaican singer Tami Chynn. It was released through Universal Mowtown Records and SRC Records in the United States on August 7, 2006 and in Japan on September 8, 2006.

== Critical reception ==
Professional ratings
Review scores
Source	Rating
AllMusic	3.5/5 stars

AllMusic editor David Jeffries found that Out of Many...One "becomes more interesting than riveting as Chynn wanders through heavier music. Nothing is filler, nothing is misguided, and the smooth "Still Afraid" brings warm reminders of the great reggae songstress J.C. Lodge, but there's no denying this B and B+ material would sound much better if it was shuffled into the album rather than stuck together."

== Chart performance ==
The album peaked at number 41 on the Oricon Albums Chart in Japan, with a total of 80,000 copies being sold in the country.

== Track listing ==
#	Title	
1.	"Intro"; Written & Produced by: Tami Chynn, C.Forte, T.Jackson, K.Kandekore	00:56
2.	"Hyperventilating"; Written & Produced By: T.Chynn, Tessanne Chin, C.Cunningham, C.Forte, Delano Thomas	3:25
3.	"Looky Looky"; Written & Produced By: T.Chynn, T.Chin, C.Forte, T.Jackson, K.Kandekore	3:13
4.	"Hot!!!"; Written & Produced By: T.Chynn, T.Chin, D.Chin-Quee	3:06
5.	"Be Mine"; Written & Produced By: T.Chynn, T.Chin, C.Forte, M.Thompson, C.Parks	3:21
6.	"1, 2, 3, 4"; Written & Produced By: T.Chynn, C.Forte, T.Jackson, K.Kandekore	3:17
7.	"Tell Mi Seh"; Written & Produced By: T.Chynn, C.Forte, T.Jackson, K.Kandekore	3:27
8.	"All Night"; Written & Produced By: J.Cambell, T.Chynn, C.Forte, T.Jackson, K.Kandekore	3:40
9.	"Bliss Is"; Written & Produced By: T.Chynn, T.Chin, P.Crossdale, T.James, T.Jackson, K.Kandekore	4:48
10.	"Love"; Written & Produced By: T.Chynn, C.Forte, T.Jackson, K.Kandekore	3:41
11.	"Don't Tell Daddy"; Written & Produced By: T.Chynn, T.Chin, C.Forte, T.Jackson, K.Kandekore	3:26
12.	"Till U Come..."; Written & Produced By: T.Chynn, T.Jackson	1:12
13.	"Can U Feel Me?"; Written & Produced By: N.Case, T.Chynn, T.Chin, B.Jobson, T.Jackson	4:02
14.	"Afraid Interlude"; Written & Produced By: T.Chynn	00:33
15.	"Still Afraid"; Written & Produced By: T.Chynn, T.Chin, C.Forte, T.Jackson, K.Kandekore	3:55

=== Japanese edition bonus tracks ===
16. "Hyperventilating" (T.O.K. remix) (T.Chynn, T.Chin, C.Cunningham, C.Forte, Michael Jarrett, C.Marsh, Delano Thomas) – 3:19

17. "Looky Looky" (Tony Kelly Remix) (T.Chynn, T.Chin, C.Forte, T.Jackson, K.Kandekore, Tony Kelly) – 3:09

== Credit ==
- Producer: Tami Chynn, Kwame Kandekore, Ty "Tyjae" Jackson, Neil Case and Tessanne Chin
- Executive Producer: Conroy Forte and Kwame Kandekore
- Mixing Producer: Esco

== Charts ==
Weekly chart performance for Out of Many...One
Chart (2006)	Peak position
Japanese Albums (Oricon)	41

== Release history ==
Out of Many...One release history
Region	Date
United States	August 23, 2006
Japan	September 8, 2006
