= Together as One (Elan Atias album) =

Studio album by Elan Atias
- Released: June 13, 2006
- Genre: Reggae
- Label: Interscope
- Producer: Tony Kanal

Together as One is the debut album of reggae singer Elan Atias, released by Interscope Records in 2006. The album reached number seven on the Billboard Top Reggae Albums chart.

== Critical reception ==
Professional ratings
Review scores
Source	Rating
AllMusic	4.5/5 stars
PopMatters	6/10 stars

Together as One received somewhat positive reviews from music critics. AllMusic stated that "Elan is already a reggae force, but with his debut album he now strongly stamps his own imprimatur on the scene." PopMatters gave it a mixed review, stating that "while no one can argue against the talent on this record, the album lacks an overall sense of…genuine emotion and raw expression".

== Track listing ==
1. "Nothing Is Worth Losing You" (Elan Atias, Ras Daveed, W. Gagel) – 4:23
2. "Girl" featuring Assassin (Atias, J.J. Campbell, S. Marsden) – 4:05
3. "I Wanna Yell" (Atias, P. Burrell) – 4:31
4. "Feel My Pressure" (Atias, Tony Kanal) – 3:14
5. "Together as One" (Atias, Kanal) – 4:43
6. "Allnighter" featuring Gwen Stefani (Atias, Kanal) – 4:01
7. "My Kingston Girl" (Atias, Burrell) – 5:31
8. "You Don't Come Around No More" Atias, S. Dunbar, R. Lyn, Lowell Dunbar, Robert Shakespeare, P. Thomas) – 4:25
9. "Do Right by You" (Atias, X. Cordova, M. Gregory, A. Kelly) – 3:37
10. "Don't You Go" featuring Tami Chynn (Atias, T. Chin, Kanal, Gabrial McNair) – 4:21
11. "We Won't Stand for This" (Atias, Kanal) – 4:15
