= Frozen (Tami Chynn song) =

Single by Tami Chynn featuring Akon
- Released: 14 May 2008
- Recorded: 2007
- Genre: Dance; R&B; reggae fusion
- Length: 3:40
- Label: Konvict Muzik, SRC, Universal Motown
- Songwriter(s): Tami Chin, Bilal Hajji, Nadir Khayat, Cyndi Lauper, Steven Lewis, Aliaune Thiam
- Producer(s): Akon, RedOne

Tami Chynn singles chronology
"Over and Over Again" (2007)	"Frozen" (2008)	"Certified Diva" (2010)

Akon singles chronology
"Dangerous" (2008)	"Frozen" (2008)	"Get Low Wit It" (2008)

Alternative covers
- Remix CD cover

"Frozen" is the first single by Jamaican, Reggae fusion artist, Tami Chynn, featuring Akon. The song is the first single for the now cancelled album, Prima Donna, which was to be released through SRC Records/Universal Mowtown Records. The album was recorded through Konvict Muzik.

== History ==
The song was released for download via iTunes in the United States on 29 April 2008 and was released in Japan on 14 May 2008. The song comes with remixes by the likes of Don Diablo, Mark Picchiotti and Ralphi Rosario.

== Formats and track listings ==
Remix single

1. "Frozen (Ralphi Rosario Club Mix)" — 7:09
2. "Frozen (Ralphi Rosario Club Mix W/O Akon)" — 6:39
3. "Frozen (Extended Album Version)" — 6:59
4. "Frozen (Ralphi Rosario Retarded Dub)" — 11:59
5. "Frozen (Album Version)" — 3:40

12" Vynl

1. "Frozen (Album Version)" — 3:40
2. "Frozen (Instrumental)" — 3:40

== Music video ==
The music video was directed by Gil Green in Los Angeles on Thanksgiving 2008. The video made its world premiere on MySpace on 2 December 2008.

== Charts ==
Chart (2008)	Peak position
U.S. Billboard Hot Dance Club Play	3
Japan Hot 100	80

== Release history ==
Region	Date	Label	Format	Catalog
Japan	14 May 2008	Universal Music Japan	CD	UICU5015
United States	29 April 2008	SRC Records/Universal Mowtown Records	Digital Download	
	17 July 2008	SRC Records/Universal Mowtown Records	Remix	
