= E Pluribus Unum (sculpture) =

- Artist: Fred Wilson

E Pluribus Unum is a public artwork proposed by American artist Fred Wilson to be located along the Indianapolis Cultural Trail at the northeast corner of Delaware and Washington streets, near the City-County Building in downtown Indianapolis, Indiana, United States.

Funded solely by private donations and fundraising by the Central Indiana Community Foundation (CICF), the sculpture was scheduled to be unveiled on September 22, 2011, the 149th anniversary of Abraham Lincoln's initial reading of the Emancipation Proclamation to members of his Cabinet. However, due to an increase of public opposition to the project beginning in September 2010, the future of the statue was discussed in a series of community meetings in 2011. On December 13, 2011, the Central Indiana Community Foundation announced that the project would be temporarily canceled.

== Design ==
E Pluribus Unum, named after the Latin phrase meaning "From many, one," was to be a re-contextualized reproduction of the nameless, semi-nude African American male sculpture seated at the base of the west facade of the Soldiers' and Sailors' Monument in downtown Indianapolis. Wilson submitted only one entry to the Indianapolis Cultural Trail committee and the design proposal of E Pluribus Unum was accepted without modification.

"Rather than creating a statue of a contemporary person as the “new heroic African American” for Indiana, it was more interesting and appropriate to reanimate the existing image. I wanted to give this nameless man a purpose and his own place in Indianapolis. It is also a vehicle for the populous to notice him, ask the questions I have asked, and to ponder the history of Indiana and Indianapolis."

— Fred Wilson, in his early description of E Pluribus Unum

The replica of the African American figure was to be 10 x 12 ft. and created in Indiana limestone. The figure would have remained seated but tilted forward in an upright position. Additionally, Wilson planned to substitute a flag of his own design for the pair of broken manacles lifted upward in the right hand of the formerly enslaved figure. The multicolored flag was a composite of African flags and the African diaspora and was inspired by the designs of African quilts and African fabric. The positioning of the flagpole was inspired by the Marine Corps War Memorial, also known as the Iwo Jima Memorial, in Washington, D.C.

Once isolated from the Soldiers' and Soldiers' Monument, the sculpture was intended to sit atop a granite, three-tier pedestal that would have stood six feet above the ground. This base was designed to complement the materials and design present in the City-County Building's civic plaza as well as provide seating for visitors. At night, a series of lights were to illuminate the sculpture.

Like his previous installations, E Pluribus Unum focused attention on the institutional framing of cultural difference. As an artist, Wilson creates shifts in meaning by manipulating the context of existing objects rather than physically altering the objects themselves.

=== Location ===
The sculpture was planned to be located on the Indianapolis Cultural Trail at the northeast corner of Delaware and Washington streets, near the City-County Building. The site was selected by Wilson for its visibility from all angles on the Cultural Trail and its lack of a visual point of interest. Some opponents of the artwork's location are concerned about the statue's close proximity to the Marion County Jail, pointing to current racial disparities in mass incarceration in the United States.

Wilson hopes that the proximity of the proposed location for the artwork to the Soldiers' and Sailors' Monument will encourage visitors to think about the relationship between the two sculptures. In Wilson's words, "I try to bring the invisible into view." One of the sites available on the Cultural Trail was located near the grounds of the Indiana Statehouse at 200 West Washington Street in Indianapolis. However, Wilson decided against placing his artwork among monuments depicting important Hoosiers and events related to the State of Indiana:

"... they're of so-called great people, great men, and mine is a sculpture. It’s not a monument. It's not of a specific person. And I felt that my project should be seen as an artwork, rather than a monument. With the notion that this would be a catalyst for asking the question, and then following up that, with why are there no other images of African Americans in monument form—and if they were to be done, they should be done at the Statehouse and other locations."

— Fred Wilson, interview with WTLC-AM radio talk show, "Afternoons with Amos.",

== Background information ==
In his visits to Indianapolis, Wilson found that there was only one, unnamed African American represented in the city's many memorials and sculptures. The formerly enslaved African American figure appears at the base of the Indiana Soldiers' and Sailors' Monument, a 284 ft. 6 in. commemoration of the American Civil War, the American Revolution, the War of 1812, the Spanish–American War and the Mexican–American War. Some suggest that with the passage of time the commemorative nature of war memorials has been replaced with a more utilitarian purpose, such as city beautification. Consequently, the Soldiers' and Sailors' Monument is said to symbolize both the city of Indianapolis and the state of Indiana. While others argue that there is nothing more invisible than monuments, some art historians suggest that art can be utilized as a vehicle for racist ideology.

Wilson is known for his practice of "mining the museum" for objects that he can recontextualize in order to question issues of representation and narrative voice. He spent time in Indianapolis in 1993 when he created a show for the Indianapolis Museum of Art titled "The Spiral of Art History." It was at this time that he noticed the abundance of monuments in Indianapolis, which would later inspire his vision for E Pluribus Unum. This is the first time that Wilson has "mined" a city's monuments in order to create a public artwork.

=== Peace group ===
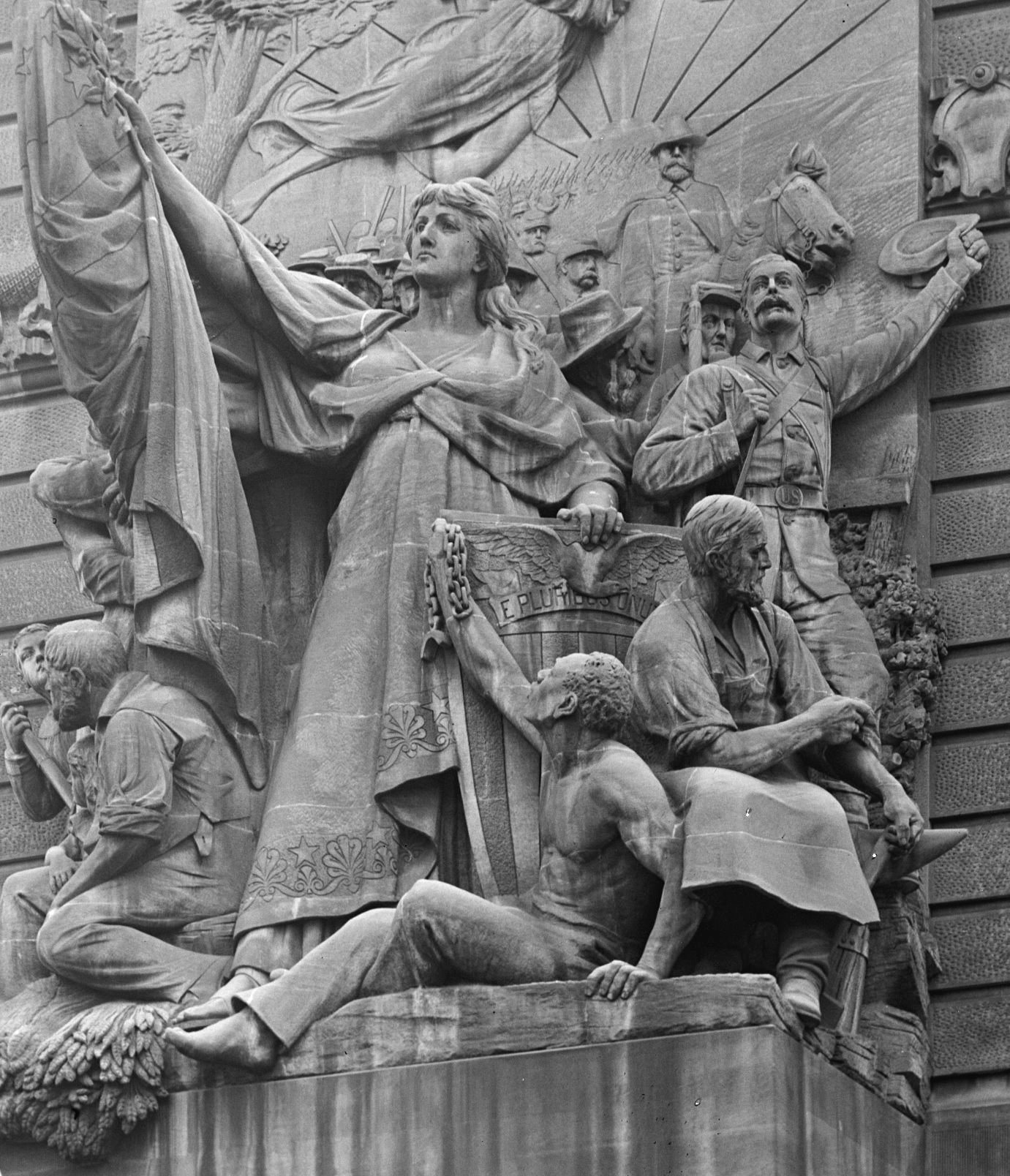
Detail of the west facade of the Soldiers' and Sailors' Monument known as the Peace group (ca. 1904)

The original figure of E Pluribus Unum, a formerly enslaved African American man, is part of a 250-ton sculpture known as the Peace group, which was designed by Herman Matzen and carved by German sculptor Rudolph Schwarz from fifty five separate blocks of limestone. In the center of the Peace group, a female figure known as both "Liberty" and "Angel of Peace" holds a Union shield and a flag wrapped in an olive branch. On the shield are the words E pluribus unum, which offers the sculpture its namesake. For Wilson, however, the phrase references Africa and the Black Diaspora. She is flanked by a blacksmith sitting on an anvil, who represents industry; a sheaf of wheat, which represents agriculture; and a homecoming of soldiers, whose lack of headgear symbolically illustrates the end of the war. At her feet sits the freed African American male figure, whose positioning reflects a common trope in nineteenth-century American sculpture that depicts African Americans kneeling in gratitude while holding broken manacles or discarded whips. These post-Reconstruction era of the United States depictions of formerly enslaved people, often shown with uncertain, upward gazes aimed toward their liberators, minimized African American efforts and sacrifices in obtaining freedom and instead interpreted the Emancipation Proclamation as an act of white benevolence.

=== Indianapolis Cultural Trail ===
E Pluribus Unum was commissioned by the Central Indiana Community Foundation (CICF) to be included on the Indianapolis Cultural Trail: A Legacy of Gene & Marilyn Glick. The Cultural Trail, a $63 million project, is an urban pedestrian and bike path connecting the city's five cultural districts: Indiana Avenue, Massachusetts Avenue, Fountain Square, the Wholesale District and the Canal and White River State Park. A total of $2 million has been invested for new public artwork along these cultural districts in Indianapolis. The curatorial advisory committee for the Cultural Trail is composed of representatives from the Indianapolis Museum of Art, Herron School of Art and Design at Indiana University–Purdue University Indianapolis, Eiteljorg Museum of American Indians and Western Art, Indiana State Museum, and other cultural organizations in city.

== Artist ==
Wilson received a MacArthur Foundation Genius Grant in 1999 and the Larry Aldrich Foundation Award in 2003. He represented the United States at the Biennial Cairo in 1992 and the Venice Biennale in 2003.

Wilson's work examines, questions, and deconstructs the traditional display of art and artifacts in museums. With the use of new text panels, sounds, lighting, and non-traditional pairings of objects, Wilson leads viewers to recognize that changes in context create changes in meaning. Wilson's juxtaposition of evocative objects forces the viewer to question the biases and limitations of cultural institutions and how they have shaped the interpretation of historical truth, artistic value, and the language of display. Wilson describes himself as of "African, Native American, European and Amerindian" descent.

== Fabrication ==
In 2009 the African American figure on the Soldiers and Sailors Monument was digitally scanned to create a three-dimensional image. The process of creating a computer model was completed in one evening using a hand-held laser scanning system. The data will be sent to a computer-controlled stone cutting machine for a rough cut of the sculpture in Indiana limestone. This material was chosen for E Pluribus Unum because of its prominence in Indianapolis architecture in the late nineteenth century and to reflect the state's geological heritage. Like the Soldiers and Sailors Monument, many official buildings and monuments in downtown Indianapolis are constructed with Indiana limestone. After the figure is cut from the stone, an artist will refine the sculpture's more detailed areas.

Multiple copies of Wilson's flag will be constructed by professional flag makers if needed for replacement. The Brooklyn, New York foundry that fabricated the flagpole for the Marine Corps War Memorial (Iwo Jima Memorial) will be constructing the flagpole for E Pluribus Unum.

=== Public dialogue ===
Wilson often incorporates social dialogue into the development of his artworks. He first considers projects with a connection to the culture and history of a place and then engages in talks with the museum or community that he's working with in order to enhance the work's meaning within that context. In the case of E Pluribus Unum, Wilson encouraged research about the African American experience in Indianapolis and incorporated public outreach in order to educate the community and promote dialogue.

A series of public discussions took place in 2009 and 2010, beginning with his first introduction of the project on February 25, 2009. Held at the historic Madam Walker Theatre in the Indiana Avenue district in Indianapolis, Wilson discussed his prior work and unveiled the digital rendering for E Pluribus Unum to a small crowd of local students and community members. The following year Wilson returned to Indianapolis for further public outreach, including an event in April 2010 at Crispus Attucks High School and in August at the Indianapolis Museum of Art.

After an increase in public opposition to the proposed artwork in September 2010, an additional meeting was organized on October 19 at the Madame Walker Theatre. It was at this point that the discussion became more controversial in nature and began to attract attention from arts critics on a national level. Wilson explained that promoting discourse in a large city like Indianapolis differs from doing so in a museum, which is a more finite environment. In earlier community talks in 2009 and early 2010, Wilson and the CICF had had little success in creating an ongoing dialogue. It wasn't until the discussion around the artwork took a more controversial turn that a larger portion of the city began to take notice. Wilson explained, "With a city, you realize—or I have come to realize—that as many groups as you speak to there are other groups. You can't ever reach everyone. So I’m just really thrilled that there’s engagement and talk about art."

== Reception ==
=== Historical context ===
In the past, others have voiced their opinions of the enslaved figure depicted on the Soldiers and Sailors Monument. Freeman Henry Morris Murray (1859–1950), an African American art historian who earned his living as a typesetter and as a lecturer, offered an early condemnation of Indianapolis' representation of African Americans in public art. In Emancipation and the Freed in American Sculpture (1916), Murray charges that with the symbolic and figurative overload of the Peace group and its sister composite, the War group on the east facade of the monument, the African American figure appears as an offensive, last-minute addition:

"It reminds me of the 'grand finale' of our old country tableau-exhibitions, in which finale (illuminated by red fire) we would try to introduce every character that had been used in the preceding 'pictures'—from 'Mother Goose' to the 'Angel of the Resurrection,' and from 'Columbus' to 'Uncle Tom and Eva'—adding, of course, 'Uncle Sam' and 'Columbia' with the Flag, and as many other characters as we were able to costume and could crowd on the stage." "I feel an impulse to seize this 'super' by his dangling foot and slide him gently off into oblivion—or else say to him, as sternly as I can: 'Awake, awake, put on thy strength ... shake thyself from the dust; arise.' You deserve a place at Liberty's side, not at her feet. Assist her soberly to uphold the Flag, while others rejoice; for, but for your strong right arm the Flag would even now perhaps be trailing in the dust!"

— Freeman Henry Morris Murray,

=== Controversy ===
In September 2010, an Indianapolis history teacher wrote an editorial to the Indianapolis Recorder, a historically black newspaper, that sparked the controversy surrounding the sculpture. The editorial stated that the sculpture is not an empowering or uplifting image for the African American community and likened the sculpture to a black lawn jockey. The debate continued on the local Amos Brown radio show, leading it to gain even more attention on local news broadcasts.

Due to the escalating debate, the Central Indiana Community Foundation (CICF) organized an additional talk between Wilson and the Indianapolis community on October 19, 2010, at the Madam Walker Theatre. After Wilson presented a slideshow of his previous work, the meeting became heated when a small, organized group began to voice their opposition to the artwork. Opponents rejected Wilson's image of a semi-nude sculpture as reflective of 21st-century African Americans, and the discussion quickly transitioned into deeper issues of institutional racism in the city of Indianapolis rather than focus on Wilson's work. Indianapolis Cultural Trail curator Mindy Taylor Ross stated, "It was just one of those situations where there are hundreds of people there and the loudest voices get heard and everyone else gets drowned out."

Following the meeting, Wilson told reporters he felt "blindsided" and "saddened" by the community response. Yet Wilson underscored the value of hearing viewpoints from the sculpture's opponents: "Having dialogue, having the discussion happen, having people tell me what they thought was really a good thing." In an interview with modern art critic Tyler Green, Wilson further elaborated, "Everyone in Indianapolis has been great to me and respectful and thrilled with what I do, but even people who are against (E Pluribus Unum) seem to still respect me and my work. They just don’t like this one."

Following the talk at the Madam Walker Theatre, Wilson appeared on the Amos Brown radio show to continue to dialogue with the community. The majority of the callers supported the artwork. Some suggested that the artwork was better suited for a museum, where visitors could choose to see his work, rather than in a permanent public space.

Those that disapprove of Wilson's use of the freed slave have shared a number of other suggestions for subject matter, such as a sculpture of Major Taylor or a modern African American family. In defense of E Pluribus Unum Wilson has said, "It's part of my practice to use the same image to make that same point rather than to make a new image. I don't believe you forget the old image until you really deal with it."

Modern art critic Tyler Green has praised Wilson for not shying from the intense public dialogue, and has described E Pluribus Unum as "the smartest, most ambitious public art project currently under consideration in America." In December 2010, Green included the proposed work on the Modern Art Notes year-end top ten list.

== Current status ==
Progress on E Pluribus Unum was placed on hold in October 2010. At that time $51,000 of Wilson's $325,000 commission for E Pluribus Unum had been paid. In January 2011, the sculpture was awarded $50,000 in project support from the Chicago-based Joyce Foundation. The annual Joyce Foundation grant supports community engagements and the development of dance, music, theater, and visual arts by artists color in major Midwestern United States cities. The grant was to be used to fund part of Wilson's commission as well as public outreach about the artwork. This outreach was to consist of discussions led by local art educators and the Greater Indianapolis Progress Committee's Race and Cultural Relations Leadership Network, with each session limited to 20 participants. The $50,000 grant was to be returned to the Joyce Foundation if the sculpture is not created. In December 2011, the Central Indiana Community Foundation held a press conference to announce cancellation of the project.
