= Gangsta for Life: The Symphony of David Brooks =

Studio album by Mavado
- Released: July 10, 2007
- Recorded: 2004–2007
- Genre: Dancehall, reggae
- Length: 61:59
- Label: VP Records
- Producer: DASECA Productions, Delly Ranx, Neil "Diamond" Edwards, Nikki Z, Stephen McGregor, Linton White, O'Neil Thomas, Trevor "Baby G" James, Johnny Wonder, Dane "Fire Links" Johnson, Michael "ZJ Liquid" Brissett, Bobby 'Digital' Dixon

Mavado chronology
Gangsta for Life: The Symphony of David Brooks (2007)	Mr. Brooks...A Better Tomorrow (2009)

Gangsta for Life: The Symphony of David Brooks is the debut album by Jamaican dancehall artist Mavado, released on July 2, 2007.

== Track listing ==
#	Title	Producer(s)	Featured Guest(s)	Composer(s)	Time	Riddim
1.	"Parental Advisory"	Neil"Diamond"Ed			1:20	
2.	"Angriest Introduction"	Desaca			0:42	
3.	"Real McKoy with a Full Clip"	DASECA Productions	Busy Signal	Brooks, D./Harrisign, C./Harrisingh, D./Marsh, C.	3:31	Anger Management
4.	"Weh Dem a Do"	Delroy "Delly Ranx" Foster		Brooks, D./Foster, D./McGregor, S.	2:46	Red Bull & Guinness
5.	"A Father's Prayer"	Neil "Diamond" Edwards			1:27	
6.	"They Fear Me"	DASECA Productions		Brooks, D./Harrisingh, D./Marsh, C.	4:26	
7.	"Definition of a Gangster"	Neil "Diamond" Edwards			0:34	
8.	"Dreaming"	DASECA Productions		Brooks, D./Harrisingh, D./Marsh, C./Thomas, O.	3:22	Dreaming
9.	"Don't Cry"	Nikki Z		Brooks, D./Edwards, C./James, J.	2:22	Z-March
10.	"Cassava Piece Radio"	Neil" Diamond" Edwards			2:00	
11.	"Dying"	DASECA Productions	Serani	Brooks, D./Harrisingh, D./Marsh, C.	3:29	
12.	"David's Interlude"	Stephen McGregor/Neil "Diamond" Edwards			0:39	
13.	"Top Shotta Nah Miss"	Stephen McGregor		Brooks, D./McGregor, S.	2:58	Power Cut
14.	"Joey D. Ratt"				0:39	
15.	"Last Night"	Linton White		Brooks, D./Kelly, D.	2:44	Show Off
16.	"A Snitch's Eulogy"				1:22	
17.	"Amazing Grace"	Stephen McGregor		Brooks, D./McGregor, S.	3:23	Tremor
18.	"Touch di Road"	O'Neil "Foota Hype" Thomas		Brooks, D./Marsh, C./Thomas, O.	3:12	Gully Creature
19.	"Me and My Dogs"	Trevor "Baby G" James		Brooks, D./Edwards, C./James, T.	3:57	Gang War
20.	"APB"				0:10	
21.	"Gully Side"	Dane "Fire Links" Johnson		Brooks, D./Marsh, C.	2:52	Airwaves
22.	"Squeeze Breast"	Michael "ZJ Liquid" Brissett		Bennett, D./Brissett, M./Brooks, D.	2:54	Bluetooth
23.	"Heart Beat"	DASECA Productions	Alaine	Brooks, D./Harrisingh, D./Marsh, C.	4:14	
24.	"Sadness"	Bobby 'Digital' Dixon		Brooks, D./Larsson, M./Williams, D./Dixon, Bobby	4:15	
25.	"Born & Raised"	DASECA Productions		Brooks, D./Harrisign, C./Harrisingh, D./Marsh, C.	3:31	
