= Temperature (Sean Paul song) =

2005 single by Sean Paul

Single by Sean Paul

from the album The Trinity
- Language: Jamaican Patois; English
- B-side: "Breakout"
- Released: 5 December 2005
- Genre: Dancehall
- Length: 3:36 (album version); 3:06 (radio edit)
- Label: Atlantic; VP
- Songwriters: Sean Paul Henriques; Adrian "IZES" Marshall; Rohan Fuller
- Producer: Rohan "Snowcone" Fuller

Sean Paul singles chronology
"Ever Blazin'" (2005)	"Temperature" (2005)	"Never Gonna Be the Same" (2006)

"Temperature" is the third worldwide and the second US single from Jamaican musician Sean Paul's third studio album, The Trinity (2005). The song uses the dancehall riddim "Applause". Officially, there are two versions of the song, which only differ in their rhythm. The track was produced by Rohan "Snowcone" Fuller and received a positive reception from music critics.

Released in December 2005, "Temperature" reached No. 1 on the Billboard Hot 100 the following year to become Paul's third US No. 1 single. The single also reached the top 10 in eight additional countries. It was the second-bestselling song of 2006 in the US. "Temperature" is widely regarded as Paul's signature song.

== Commercial performance ==
Throughout 2006, "Temperature" sold 1,533,362 digital copies in the United States.

== Music video ==
The winter sequence from the music video.

The official music video, directed by Little X, has surpassed 500 million views on YouTube. In the video, Sean Paul is seen rapping with female backup dancers. The first dance sequence was with blowing leaves, centered in autumn. Then as weather gets cooler, Paul is in the snow while the thermometer freezing, centered in winter. The third sequence is in the rain, centered on spring. Finally, Paul at a tanning salon squirting sunscreen, centered on summer. There is evident sexual innuendo in the squirting of the lotion from the sunscreen bottles. At the end, Paul is sitting in a Chrysler 300 LX at an import tuner meet holding a dance off in a warehouse, rapping the beginning of "Breakout" and the meet is busted by a Toronto Metropolitan Police officer in a peculiarly long phased out vehicle.

== Track listings ==
US 12-inch single

A1. "Temperature" (album version) – 3:37
A2. "Temperature" (instrumental) – 3:37
B1. "Breakout" (album version) – 2:59
B2. "Breakout" (instrumental) – 2:59

Australian CD single

1. "Temperature" (album version)
2. "U a Pro"
3. "As Time Goes On"

European CD single

1. "Temperature" (album version)
2. "U a Pro"

UK CD1

1. "Temperature" (album version) – 3:37
2. "As Time Goes On" – 4:53

UK CD2

1. "Temperature" – 3:37
2. "As Time Goes On" – 4:53
3. "U a Pro" – 2:57
4. "Temperature" (video)
5. "Temperature" (Mytone ringtone)

== Charts ==
=== Weekly charts ===
Chart (2006)	Peak position
Australia (ARIA)	5
Australian Urban (ARIA)	2
Austria (Ö3 Austria Top 40)	19
Belgium (Ultratop 50 Flanders)	8
Belgium (Ultratop 50 Wallonia)	2
Canada (Nielsen SoundScan)	2
Canada CHR/Pop Top 30 (Radio & Records)	2
CIS Airplay (TopHit)	151
Denmark (Tracklisten)	8
European Hot 100 Singles (Billboard)	1
France (SNEP)	4
France Airplay (SNEP)	1
Germany (GfK)	14
Hungary (Dance Top 40)	22
Ireland (IRMA)	20
Netherlands (Dutch Top 40)	6
Netherlands (Single Top 100)	3
Russia Airplay (TopHit)	146
Scottish Singles Sales (Official Charts)	20
Sweden (Sverigetopplistan)	24
Switzerland (Schweizer Hitparade)	10
UK Singles (Official Charts)	11
US Billboard Hot 100	1
US Hot Latin Songs (Billboard)	10
US Hot R&B/Hip-Hop Songs (Billboard)	5
US Hot Rap Songs (Billboard)	2
US Pop 100 (Billboard)	2
US Pop Airplay (Billboard)	1
US Rhythmic Airplay (Billboard)	2

=== Year-end charts ===
Chart (2006)	Position
Australia (ARIA)	30
Australian Urban (ARIA)	11
Austria (Ö3 Austria Top 40)	70
Belgium (Ultratop 50 Flanders)	19
Belgium (Ultratop 50 Wallonia)	10
Brazil (Crowley)	66
European Hot 100 Singles (Billboard)	42
France (SNEP)	32
Germany (Media Control GfK)	69
Netherlands (Dutch Top 40)	53
Netherlands (Single Top 100)	37
Switzerland (Schweizer Hitparade)	59
UK Singles (OCC)	111
UK Urban (Music Week)	14
US Billboard Hot 100	2
US Hot Latin Songs (Billboard)	44
US Hot R&B/Hip-Hop Songs (Billboard)	28
US Rhythmic Airplay (Billboard)	8

=== Decade-end charts ===
Chart (2000–2009)	Position
US Billboard Hot 100	63

== Certifications ==
Region	Certification	Certified units/sales
Australia (ARIA)	Gold	35,000^{^}
Canada (Music Canada)	3× Platinum	240,000^{‡}
Denmark (IFPI Danmark)	Platinum	90,000^{‡}
Germany (BVMI)	Platinum	600,000^{‡}
Italy (FIMI)	Platinum	100,000^{‡}
Japan (RIAJ)	Gold	100,000^{*}
New Zealand (RMNZ)	3× Platinum	90,000^{‡}
Spain (Promusicae)	Gold	30,000^{‡}
Switzerland (IFPI Switzerland)	Gold	20,000^{^}
United Kingdom (BPI)	3× Platinum	1,800,000^{‡}
United States (RIAA)	3× Platinum	3,000,000^{‡}
Ringtone
Canada (Music Canada)	3× Platinum	120,000^{*}
United States (RIAA)	2× Platinum	2,000,000^{*}
^{*} Sales figures based on certification alone.^{^} Shipments figures based on certification alone.^{‡} Sales+streaming figures based on certification alone.

== Release history ==
Region	Date	Format(s)	Label(s)	Ref.
United States	5 December 2005	Rhythmic contemporary; urban radio	Atlantic; VP	
United States	23 January 2006	Contemporary hit radio	Atlantic; VP	
United Kingdom	20 March 2006	12-inch vinyl; CD	Atlantic; VP	
Australia	22 May 2006	CD	Atlantic; VP	

== See also ==
- List of Hot 100 number-one singles of 2006 (U.S.)
- List of European number-one hits of 2006
