= Hyperventilating (song) =

Single by Tami Chynn

from the album Out of Many...One
- Released: 2007
- Recorded: 2007
- Genre: Dance, reggae fusion, dancehall
- Length: 3:25
- Label: SRC, Universal Music Group
- Songwriter(s): T.Chynn, Tessanne Chin, Cesar Cunningham, Craig Marsh, C.Forte, Delano Thomas, Michael Jarrett

Tami Chynn singles chronology
"Tell Mi Seh" (2004)	"Hyperventilating" (2007)	"Looky Looky" (2007)

"Hyperventilating" is a song by Jamaican reggae fusion singer Tami Chynn. It was released as the first single from her first album, Out of Many...One, which was released through SRC Records and Universal Music.

== Background ==
The song uses the riddim that Stepz Medley used in other reggae songs like "We Be Burnin'" by Sean Paul. It was her first single released outside Jamaica after signing with Universal Motown Records but it only became an online hit and failed to enter the charts.

== Music video ==
The video was directed by Tim Naylor and shot at Shadow Studios in New York City in October, 2005

The video starts with footage of Tami Chynn riding on the back of a scooter and then shows her dancing in a house with flashes to other dancers.

== Formats and track listings ==
These are the formats and track listings for "Hyperventilating".

12" vinyl promo

1. "Hyperventilating" — 3:31
2. "Hyperventilating (Instrumental)" — 3:26
3. "Hyperventilating (T.O.K. Remix)" — 3:18
4. "Hyperventilating (T.O.K. Remix Instrumental)" — 3:18

Netherlands promo single

1. "Hyperventilating" — 3:31
2. "Hyperventilating (T.O.K. Remix)" — 3:18

Japan maxi-single

1. "Hyperventilating" — 3:31
2. "Hyperventilating (T.O.K. Remix)" — 3:18

US single

1. "Hyperventilating" — 3:31
2. "Hyperventilating (T.O.K. Remix)" — 3:18
3. "Looky Looky" — 5:46
4. "Hyperventilating (Multimedia Track)"
