= Wayne Marshall (DJ) =

Wayne Marshall OD
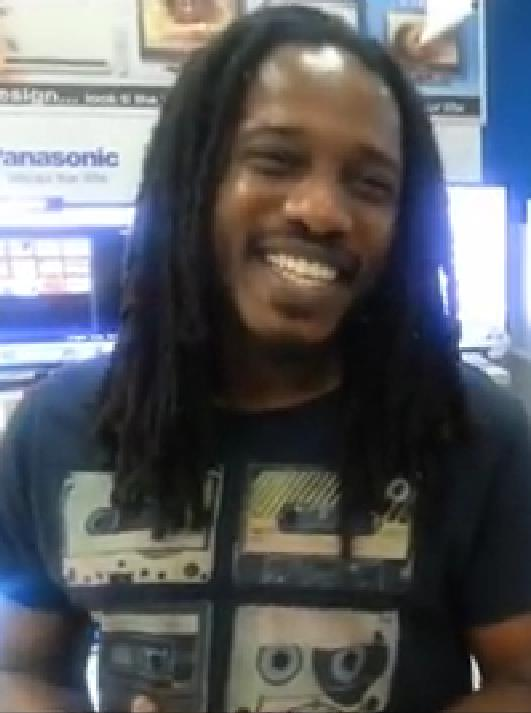
- Marshall in 2012

Background information
- Also known as: Wayne Marshall
- Born: Wayne Mitchell; 9 April 1980 (age 45)
- Genres: Dancehall, reggae, reggae fusion
- Occupation: Deejay
- Instrument: Vocals
- Years active: 2001–present
- Labels: VP Records, Federation Sound
- Spouse: Tami Chynn (m. 2009)

Wayne Omar Mitchell OD (born 9 April 1980), better known by his stage name Wayne Marshall, is a Jamaican reggae and dancehall DJ. He is most notable for his collaborations with Sean Paul, Elephant Man and Beenie Man. He also attended the Wolmer's Trust High School for Boys and married fellow reggae/dancehall artiste Tami Chynn in 2009.

Marshall's debut solo album Marshall Law was released by VP Records is 2003. Reviewers noted strong hip-hop influences in Marshall's dancehall music. Forbidden Fruit was released the next year, and Tru Story!, released by Federation Sound, followed in 2008.

During the 2000s, he issued dozens of 7" singles, mostly on VP Records.

In 2009, he was featured in the dancehall remix to Jamie Foxx's "Blame It". Marshall's single, "Messing with My Heart", featuring Mavado, from his third album was released in November 2010. Marshall collaborated with British musician Toddla T on the track "Streets So Warm", which was released as the third single from his 2011 album Watch Me Dance.

He recorded the Damian Marley-produced album Tru Colours in 2013, which was released in January 2014, with an EP of the same name released in November 2013.

In 2014, he recorded "Jamaican Mannaz" for the organization Do Good Jamaica, aimed at encouraging good manners in children.

He is not to be confused with the British R&B singer of the same name. The latter had entries in the UK Singles Chart with "Ooh Aah (G-Spot)" and "Never Knew Love Like This" with Pauline Henry in the mid-1990s.

== Discography ==
- 2003 - Marshall Law
- 2008 - Tru Story!
- 2013 - Tru Colors EP
- 2014 - Tru Colors
