= Tami Chynn =

- Born: Tammar Annika Chin; 14 June 1983 (age 42); Kingston, Jamaica
- Spouse: Wayne Marshall (m. 2009)
- Musical career
- Genres: R&B; reggae; dancehall
- Occupations: Singer, songwriter, dancer
- Instruments: Vocals
- Years active: 2005–present
- Label: Universal/SRC/Konvict Muzik (former)
- Website: TamiChynn.com

Tammar Chin Mitchell (born 14 June 1983), known by her stage name Tami Chynn, is a Jamaican singer, songwriter, and dancer.

== Early life ==
Chynn was born in Kingston, Jamaica. Her father, Richard Chin, is of Jamaican and Chinese descent and her mother, Christine Chin, also a Jamaican national, is of English and African descent. Her parents were in a band called The Carnations and her younger sister, Tessanne Chin is also a singer, best known for winning Season 5 of the US singing competition The Voice as part of Adam Levine's team.

Tami grew up in the parish of St. Andrew and attended St. Peter and Paul Preparatory School. She later attended Campion College in St. Andrew, Jamaica. In 1998, at age 14, she moved to Leamington Spa, UK where she spent three years studying the performing arts and in 2001, at age 17, moved back to Jamaica, where she worked on her music career and recorded her first single "Rock U."

In 2010, Tami collaborated with Slovakia-born fashion designer Lubica Kucerova to create the Anuna and Anuna Goddess collections. The collection debuted at 2010 Fashion Art Toronto: Alternative Arts Fashion Week. Later that year, the duo would be nominated at The Jamaica Observer Style Awards and win the Designer of the Year Award.

== Music career ==
=== 2005–2007: Beginnings and Out of Many... One ===
Before pursuing music, she toured with fellow Jamaican artist Shaggy as a backup dancer on his Caught Red Handed Tour. In early 2005 she travelled to Los Angeles to perform for Universal Motown Records and in May she was signed to the major label, at age 24, for a four-album deal. Before releasing her debut album in the US, she appeared in recordings with international Reggae stars: Beenie Man, Lady Saw and Sean Paul on his album The Trinity for the track "All on Me".

In March 2006, she was nominated for Best New Entertainer Award at the International Reggae and World Music Awards, but lost the award to reggae artist Matisyahu. Leading up to the release of her debut album, Out of Many...One she toured clubs around the US for promotion.

Later in 2006 she released her first US single "Hyperventilating" which became a hit on the internet that summer but wasn't a mainstream success. During that summer she released her first album Out of Many...One which also failed to chart in the US but managed to peak at No. 41 on the Japanese Oricon charts. In 2007 her song "Over and Over" appeared on the compilations.

=== 2008–present: New record label and Prima Donna ===
In 2008, Tami was noticed by Akon, who signed her up to his label Konvict Muzik and began production of her second album Prima Donna. Recording of the album began in January in Akon's Atlanta studios with Akon and RedOne executive producing the album. Frozen (featuring Akon), the lead single for the album, was released in August 2008. In March she toured the UK and made an appearance on BBC Radio 1Xtra, on 22 March 2008 with Akon and performed Frozen.

In September 2008, she starred in a Pepsi commercial alongside Verne Troyer, T-Pain and Shaggy doing a cover of Carl Douglas' classic disco song Kung Fu Fighting with vocals from Akon. During October 2008 she opened for New Kids on the Block on their New Kids on the Block Tour alongside Lady Gaga, Natasha Bedingfield and Colby O'Donis. She also appeared in the video "I'm So Paid" by Akon. After cutting ties with Universal, Prima Donna remains unreleased; however, Tami Chynn has stated she is currently at work on a third album that is to become a second release.

In 2011, Jennifer Lopez re-recorded "Hypnotico," a song where Tami had written with Lady Gaga and RedOne and recorded for her unreleased second album Prima Donna for Lopez's seventh studio album Love? released 3 May 2011 in the United States.

As of 2014, she works as her sister Tessanne Chin's manager.

== Personal life ==
Tami married fellow reggae/dancehall artist Wayne Marshall in 2009. The couple has five children in total (four with Wayne and one stepson from her husband's previous relationship).

== Discography ==
=== Studio albums ===
Year	Album	Peak chart positions		Sales	Certifications
Year	Album	JPN	Billboard US	Sales	Certifications
2006	Out of Many...One: Debut studio album; Released: 7 August 2006; Label: Universal/SRC	41	—	JPN: 80,000	—
"—" denotes releases that did not chart or were not released in that territory.

=== Singles ===
Year	Single	Peak positions			Album
Year	Single	US Dance Club Play	US Dance Airplay	JPN	Album
2001	"Rock U" (feat. Kid Kurup)	—	—	—	Single Only
2004	"Hyperventilating (Stepz Medly)"	—	—	—	Single Only
2004	"Ice Breaker Medley (Gimme Good)"	—	—	—	Single Only
2004	"Why"	—	—	—	Single Only
2004	"Tell Mi Seh"	—	—	—	Out of Many...One
2006	"Hyperventilating"	—	—	—	Out of Many...One
2006	"Over and Over Again"	—	—	—	Out of Many...One
2008	"Frozen" (feat. Akon)	3	17	80	Prima Donna
2010	"Certified Diva" (feat. Tifa)	—	—	—	Single Only
2010	"Nevah Know (Wicked Inna Bed)"	—	—	—	Bad Suh Riddim
2011	"Long Time"	—	—	—	Single Only
"—" denotes releases that did not chart or were not released in that territory.

==== As featured artist ====
Song	Artist	Album
"Don't You Go"	Elan (feat. Tami Chynn)	Together as One
"All on Me"	Sean Paul (feat. Tami Chynn)	The Trinity
"Ice Breaker Riddim Medley"	(feat. Tami Chynn, Voicemail, Wayne Marshall, Kid Kurupt, Christopher, Assassin, Busy Signal)	Single only
"Hot Part 2"	Le7is aka Jonathan Edward Chisolm (feat. Tami Chynn)	Single only
"Arguin"	Wayne Marshall (feat. Tami Chynn)	Single only
"Why"	Wayne Marshall (feat. Tami Chynn)	Single only
"Take Me Back Remix"	Tinchy Stryder (feat. Tami Chynn, Taio Cruz, Sway and Chipmunk)	Single only
"Can You Feel Me"	Michael Bolton (feat. Tami Chynn)	One World One Love
"Sycamore Tree"	Sean Paul (feat. Tami Chynn)	Single

=== Music videos ===
Year	Title	Director
2001	"Rock U"	Ras Kassa
2004	"Hyperventilating (Stepz Medly)"	Nordia Rose
2004	"Ice Breaker Medley (Gimme Good)"	Nadia & Naylor
2004	"Why"	Jay Hill
2004	"Tell Mi Seh"	Nadia & Naylor
2006	"Hyperventilating"	Tim Naylor
2006	"Over and Over Again"	
2008	"Frozen"	Gil Green
