= Mavado (singer) =

Jamaican singer

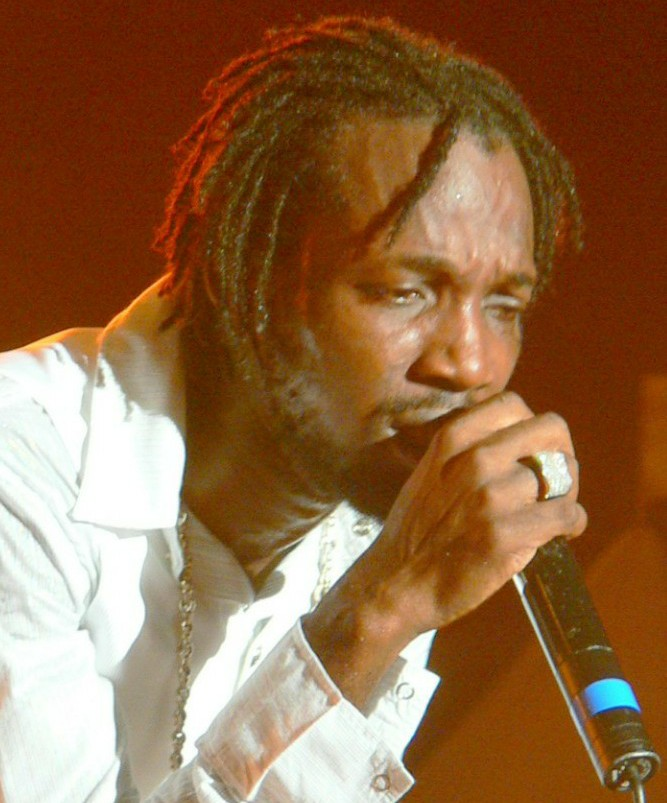
- Mavado in 2008

Background information
- Also known as: Gully God
- Born: David Constantine Brooks; 30 November 1981 (age 44); Kingston, Jamaica
- Genres: Dancehall; reggae
- Occupations: Singer; deejay
- Years active: 2004–present
- Labels: We the Best; Cash Money; Mansion Records; VP

David Constantine Brooks (born 30 November 1981), better known by his stage name Mavado, is a Jamaican singer. Mavado signed with DJ Khaled's We the Best Music Group, a then-imprint of Cash Money and Republic Records in 2011. He guest performed on each of Khaled's studio albums, beginning with We the Best Forever (2011) until parting ways with the label prior to the release of his twelfth, Khaled Khaled (2021). His 2013 single, "Give It All to Me" (featuring Nicki Minaj) was released in promotion for his debut major label studio album, which remains unreleased.

== Biography ==
David Constantine Brooks was raised in the Cassava Piece community of uptown Kingston, Jamaica. He cites the music of Bounty Killer as an early influence. Bounty took him under his wing to show him the ropes of the music industry and introduced him to his manager, Julian Jones-Griffith. He decided to name himself "Mavado" after the Swiss watch company Movado, with his manager altering the spelling.

In 2005, Mavado had his breakthrough with his first single, "Real McKoy". Mavado released the album Gangsta for Life: The Symphony of David Brooks 10 July 2007 on VP Records. The single "Dying" from the album was featured heavily on New York's WQHT (Hot 97) R&B/hip-hop radio station.

That same year brought Mavado off-stage controversy, as he was detained by Jamaican police. While in police custody, the singer claims he was thrown through a glass window, slicing three fingers in the process, which were reattached at a local hospital. Police claimed Mavado escaped from custody while at the hospital. He was later arrested and charged with shooting with intent and illegal possession of firearm in relation to an event occurring 27 July 2007. Mavado was released two days later on a $3000 bail and was subsequently refused entry into the United States.

Mavado did not sign the Reggae Compassionate Act and has been criticised for anti-gay lyrics (in such songs as ''Batty Bwoy Termination'' where the lyrics say "Battyboy must die, Lesbian must die, Sodomite must die"), as well as alleged promotion of gun violence. The issue caused him to be banned at times from several Caribbean countries.

In March 2008, Mavado was featured performing a rendition of his song "Real McKoy" for Grand Theft Auto IV Trailer #4 "Everyone's a Rat". "Real McKoy", along with "Last Night" (both from the album Gangsta for Life), were also featured in the game on the radio station "Massive B Radio". Mavado was also featured on the G-Unit track 'Let It Go' along with Tony Yayo and Lloyd Banks for the album: T·O·S (Terminate on Sight) in 2008. He was the only non-G-Unit feature on the album. In 2008 Mavado was given the UK MOBO Award for Best Reggae Act.

In April 2010, Mavado starred in a music video as a gangster in Drake's song "Find Your Love" for Drake's album Thank Me Later. Mavado formed his own label, Mansion Records, in 2011, which debuted with the single "Delilah". Along with Bounty Killer, he has cited 2Pac as a childhood idol, comparing the late rapper's life to his own.

In 2011, Mavado recorded with U.K. grime artist Chipmunk on the track "Every Gyal". On 1 September 2011, Mavado appeared on the Angie Martinez show on New York's Hot 97 radio station to announce that he had signed a deal with DJ Khaled's record label We the Best Music Group. Mavado released three singles "Emergency" featuring Ace Hood, Soulja girl and "Survivor" featuring Akon on We the Best Music Group.

In May 2012 he was convicted of assault occasioning actual bodily harm and malicious destruction of property after a driving incident, and was fined a total of $100,000. An appeal against the sentence was unsuccessful. In 2012, it was announced that Mavado would feature in a "Shottas 2" a sequel to the Shottas movie, which had starred Ky-Mani Marley and Spragga Benz.

In 2016, Mavado's song "Progress" on the Mineral Boss Records produced "Money Boss Riddim" was featured in DJ Khaled's Major Key album. The album was nominated for the 2017 Grammy Awards on the "best rap" album category. In 2017, Mavado, Alkaline and Jahmiel formed a camp known as MVP, which Mavado claimed to be the "biggest thing" in dancehall at that time.

In 2018, Mavado collaborated with Sean Paul for an inspirational song called "I'm Sanctify". In 2019, Mavado released a song called "Top Shotta Is Back" On a Riddim called The Aircraft Riddim produced by Chimney Records.

In 2020, Mavado recorded and released a Drake diss song called "Enemy Line".

== Discography ==
=== Albums ===
- 2007: Gangsta for Life: The Symphony of David Brooks
- 2009: Mr. Brooks...A Better Tomorrow

=== Singles ===
==== As lead artist ====
- "Weh Dem Ah Do" (2007)
- "Real McKoy" (2007)
- "Lost Dem" (2011)
- "Do Road" (2011)
- "Take It" featuring Karian Sang (2012)
- "Give It All to Me" featuring Nicki Minaj (2013)
- "Million Dollar Man" (2013)
- "Tie Yuh" (2014)
- "Ben Ova" (2014)
- "My Pan " (2014)
- "Ain't Going Back Broke" featuring Future and Ace Hood (2015)
- "Ghetto Bible" (2015)
- "My League" (2015)
- "Big League" (2016)
- "Progress" (2016)
- "Mama" (2017)
- "Red Rose" (2017)
- "Dress to Impress" (2018)
- "Enemies" (2018)
- "I'm Sanctify" featuring Sean Paul (2018)
- "Father God" (2018)
- "Enemy Lines" (2020)

==== As featured artist ====
Year	Single	Peak positions	Album
Year	Single	FR	Album
2008	"Caribbean Connection" (Lil' Kim featuring Wyclef Jean and Mavado)	—	—N/a
2012	"One by One" (Laza Morgan featuring Mavado)	34	—N/a
2012	"Who Wan Test" (Nino Brown featuring Mavado and Junior Reid)	—	We Don't See Em 3
2013	"Lighters Up" (Snoop Lion featuring Popcaan and Mavado)	—	Reincarnated
2013	"Gangsta" (Vado ft. Mavado & Ace Hood)	—	—N/a
2014	"Lady Patra" (Iggy Azalea featuring Mavado)	—	The New Classic
2016	"Progress" (DJ Khaled featuring Mavado)	—	Major Key
2016	"Saugod" (Ramriddlz featuring Mavado)	—	—N/a
2016	"Legendary" (Chinx featuring Mavado & French Montana)	—	Legends Never Die
2017	"God Knows" (Kalash featuring Mavado)	95	Mwaka Moon
2018	"Coming from Afar" (Matisyahu featuring Mavado)	—	—N/a
2019	"Hot Gyal" (XXXTentacion featuring Mavado)	—	Bad Vibes Forever
