= List of songs recorded by No Doubt =

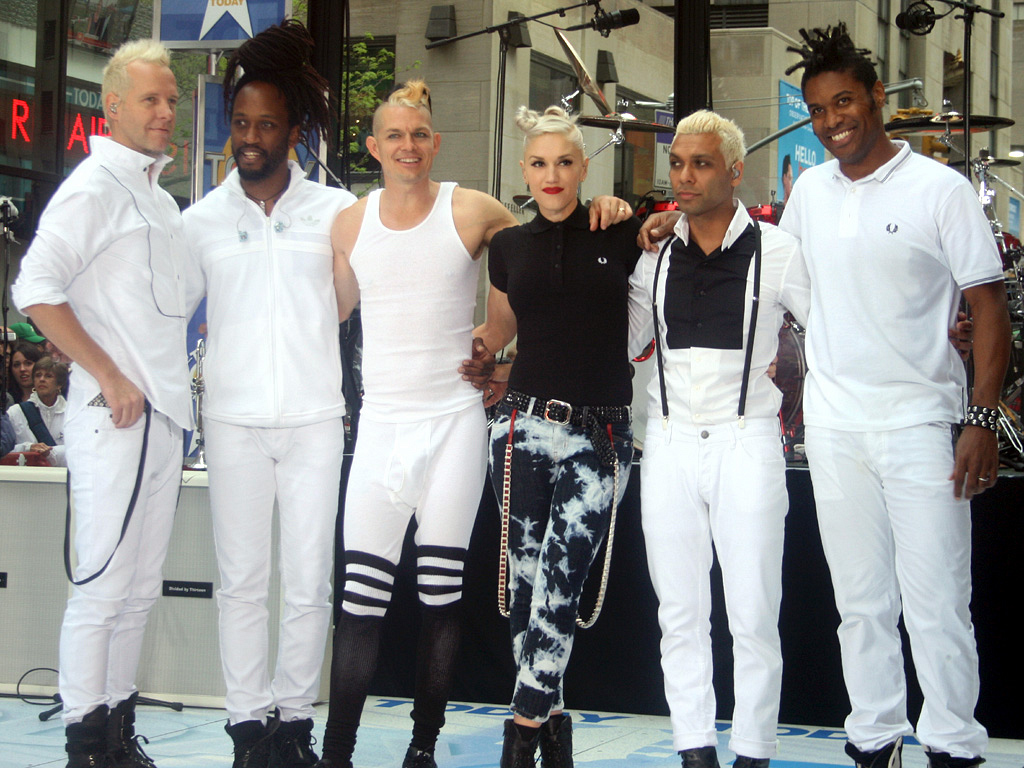
No Doubt after a live performance for Today in 2009

American band No Doubt has recorded over 100 songs for six studio albums, various compilations and soundtracks, and has been featured on songs on other artists' albums. After forming in 1986, the band released a series of demo tapes at their concerts and live shows. Several of the songs on these tapes ("Ache", "Let's Get Back", "Move On", "Paulina", and "Sometimes") later appeared on their 1992 debut album, No Doubt. In response to the commercial disappointment of their debut and being dropped from Interscope Records, the group produced The Beacon Street Collection (1995) by themselves. The album took influence from punk music, which differentiated it from the new wave and synth influences of their debut. Their third studio album, Tragic Kingdom (1995), incorporated punk, pop, and ska; the album spawned seven singles, including the commercially successful hits "Just a Girl", "Spiderwebs", and "Don't Speak". The majority of the album's songs were written by Gwen Stefani, whereas her brother Eric Stefani had written the bulk of No Doubt and The Beacon Street Collection. Tragic Kingdom has sold 16 million copies worldwide as of 2015, and is one of the best-selling albums of all time in the United States. In 2000, No Doubt released their fourth studio album, Return of Saturn. Four singles were released: "New", "Ex-Girlfriend", "Simple Kind of Life", and "Bathwater". Lyrically, the songs featured on Return of Saturn are complex and have Stefani singing about her personal romances.

No Doubt's fifth album – Rock Steady (2001) – features contributions from a wide variety of high-profile musicians, including William Orbit, Prince, David Stewart, and Pharrell Williams. It features "mainstream pop" and reggae music and was released following the commercial success of two of Gwen Stefani's solo singles: "South Side" (2000) and "Let Me Blow Ya Mind" (2001). In 2003, the group's first compilation album The Singles 1992–2003 was released and included a cover of "It's My Life", originally recorded by Talk Talk. After 2004, the group took a brief hiatus before reuniting in 2009 for work on a new album. Push and Shove (2012) serves as No Doubt's comeback record and spawned two singles ("Settle Down" and "Looking Hot") and two promotional singles ("Stand and Deliver" and "Push and Shove"). They also collaborated with Jamaican rapper Busy Signal and American trio Major Lazer for the title track. Push and Shove explores more modern sounds and expands on their exploration with dancehall and reggae music. The group also has writing credits on several other albums. They collaborated with Elvis Costello on "I Throw My Toys Around" for the soundtrack to The Rugrats Movie (1998) and recorded a cover of Donna Summer's "Love to Love You Baby" for the 2001 soundtrack to Zoolander.

== Songs ==
All songs recorded by No Doubt, except where noted. This is not a complete list.

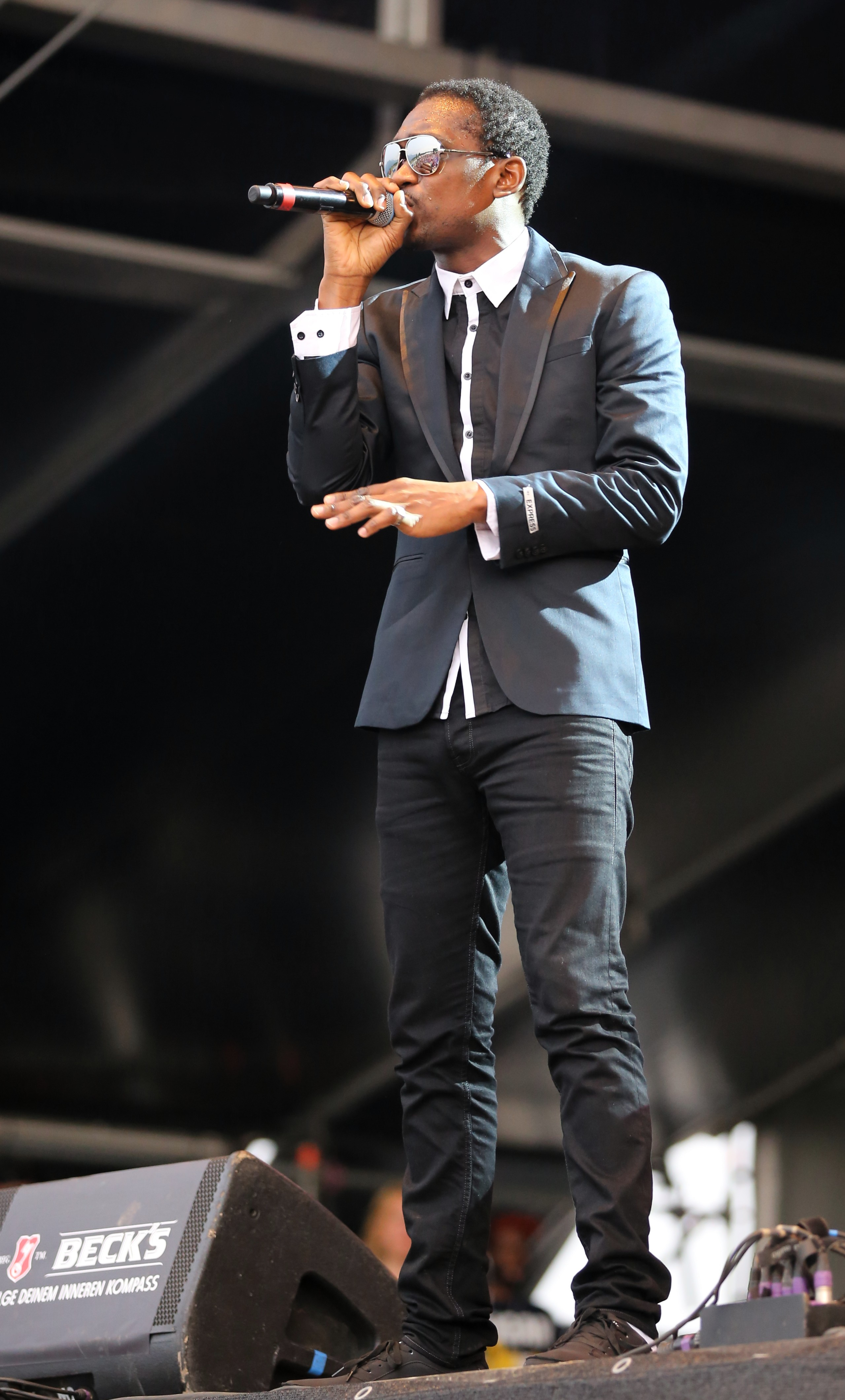
Busy Signal is a featured artist on the title track for Push and Shove (2012).

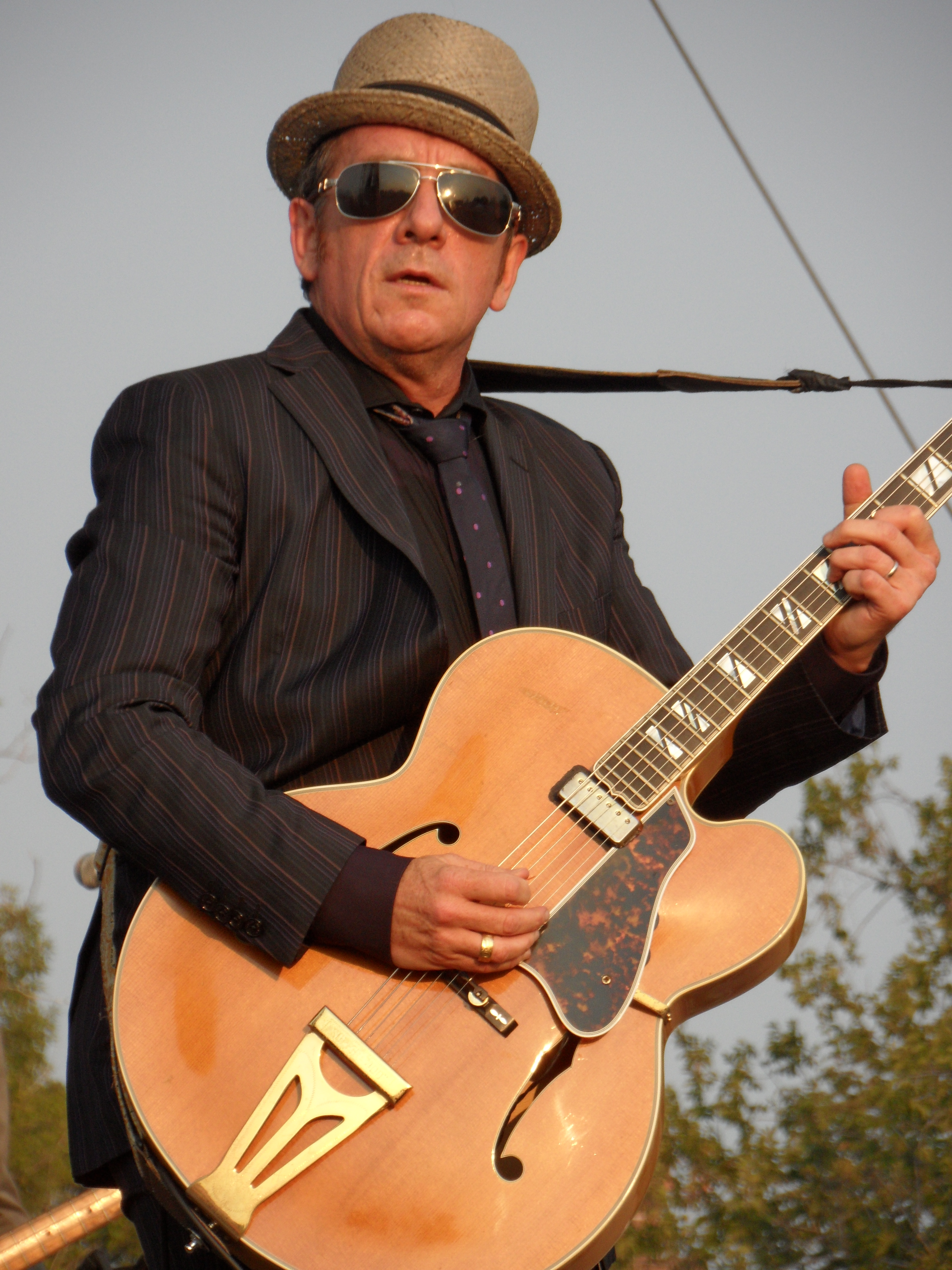
Elvis Costello collaborated with the group on a cover of "I Throw My Toys Around" for The Rugrats Movie soundtrack in 1998.

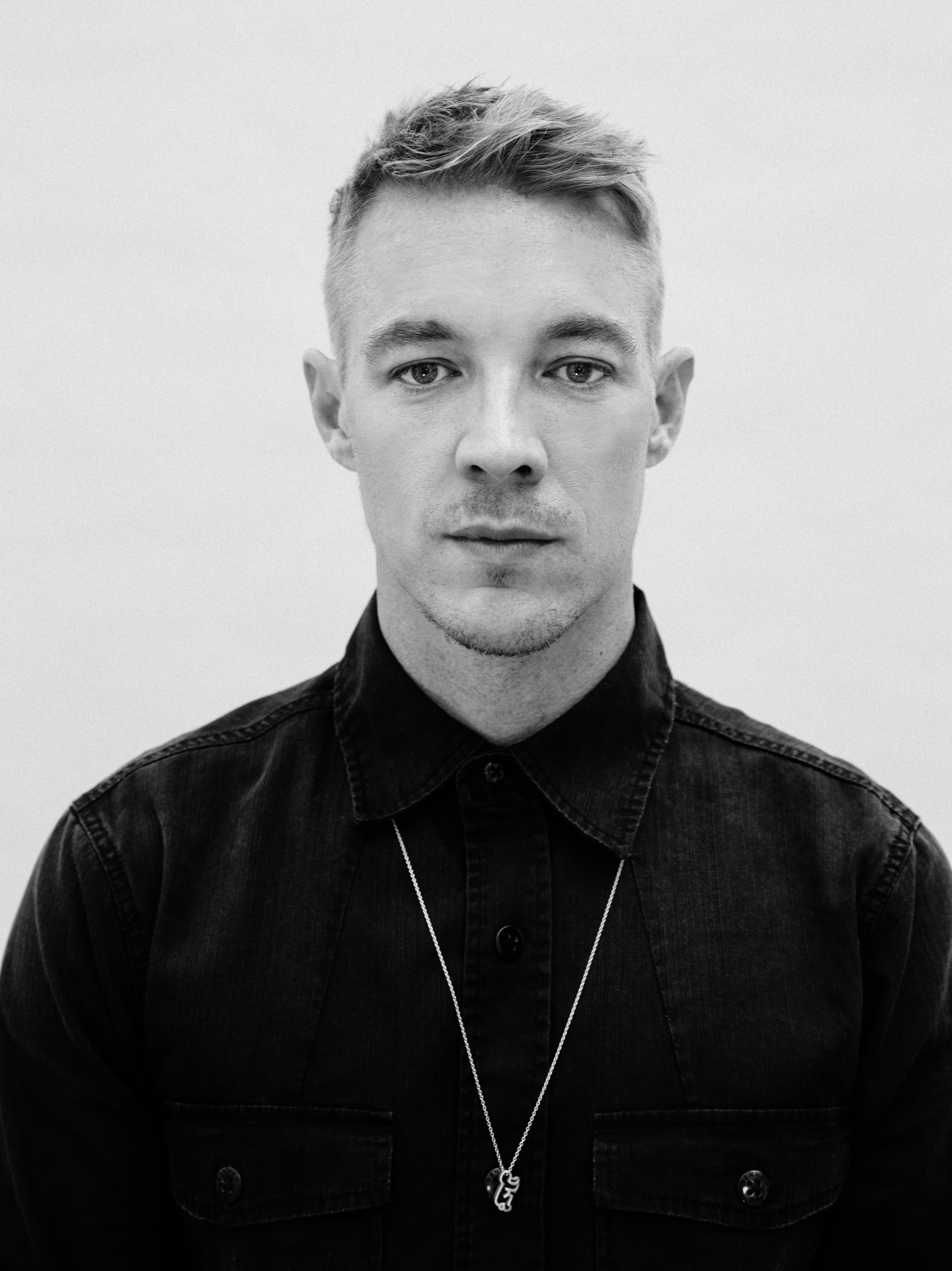
Diplo co-wrote "Push and Shove" in 2012.

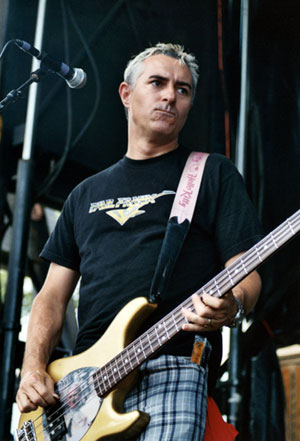
No Doubt recorded a cover of the Christmas song "Oi to the World", which was written by Joe Escalante.

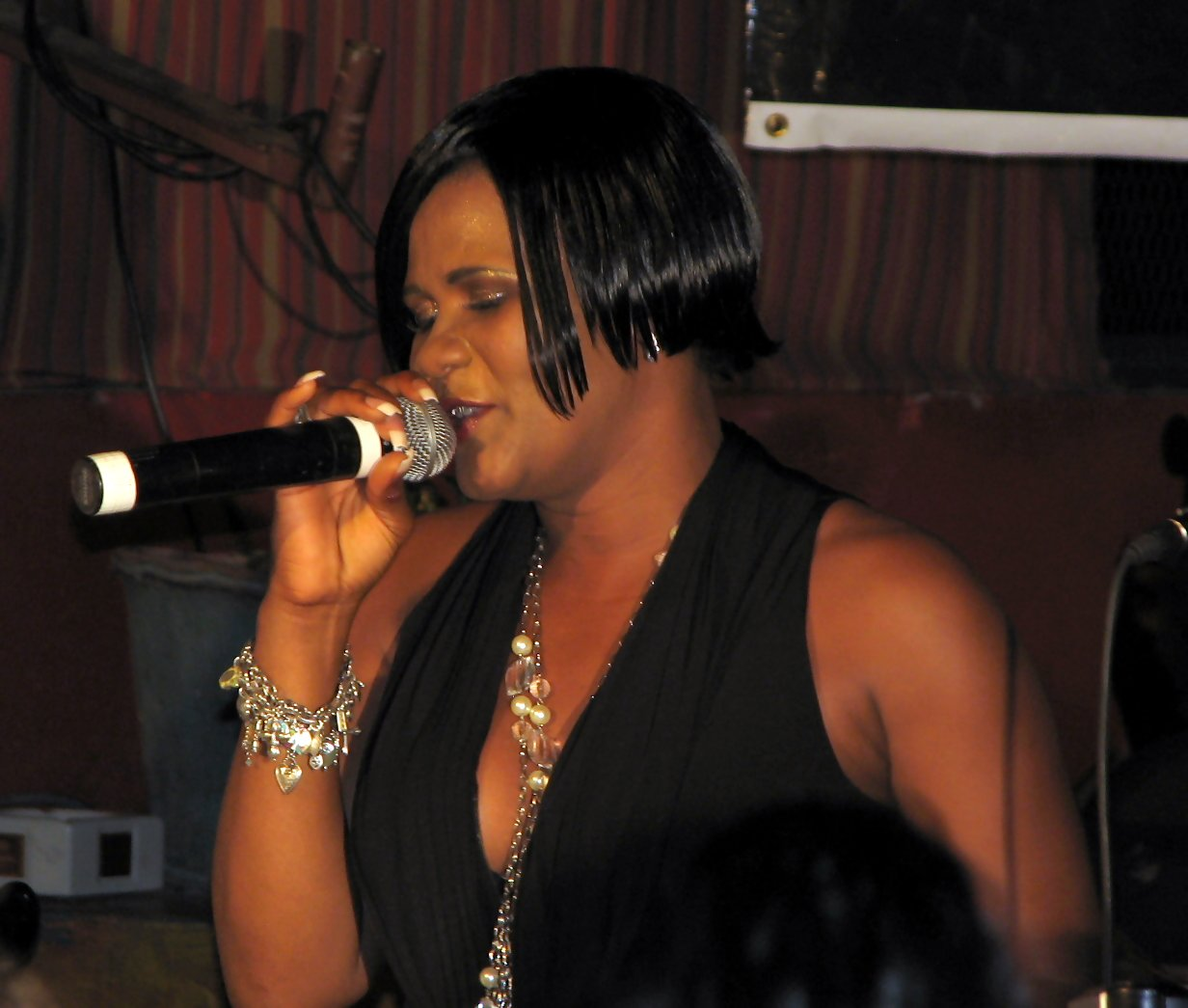
Jamaican singer Lady Saw raps a verse for the 2001 single "Underneath It All".

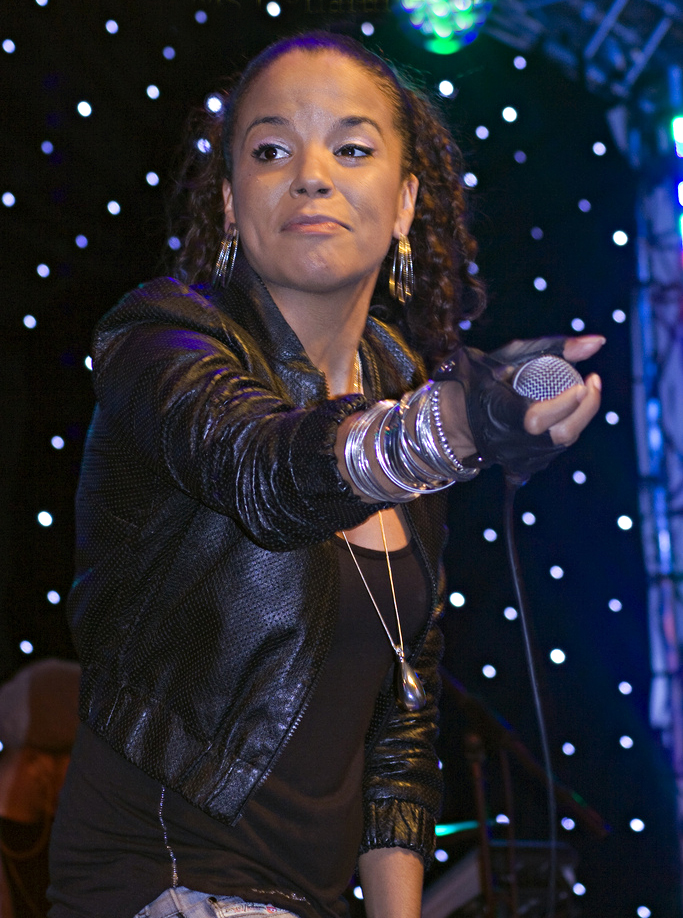
British musician Ms. Dynamite contributes guest vocals to "A Real Love Survives", a remix of No Doubt's "Rock Steady".

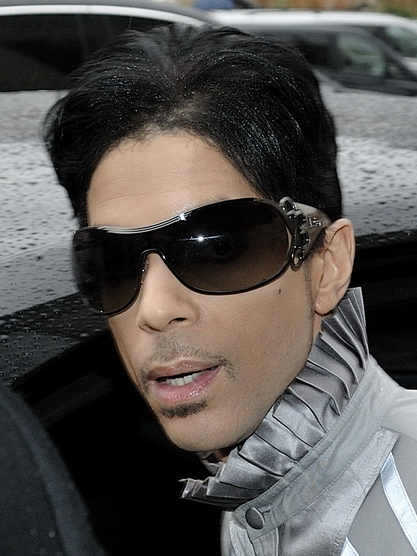
Prince co-wrote "Waiting Room" for Rock Steady.

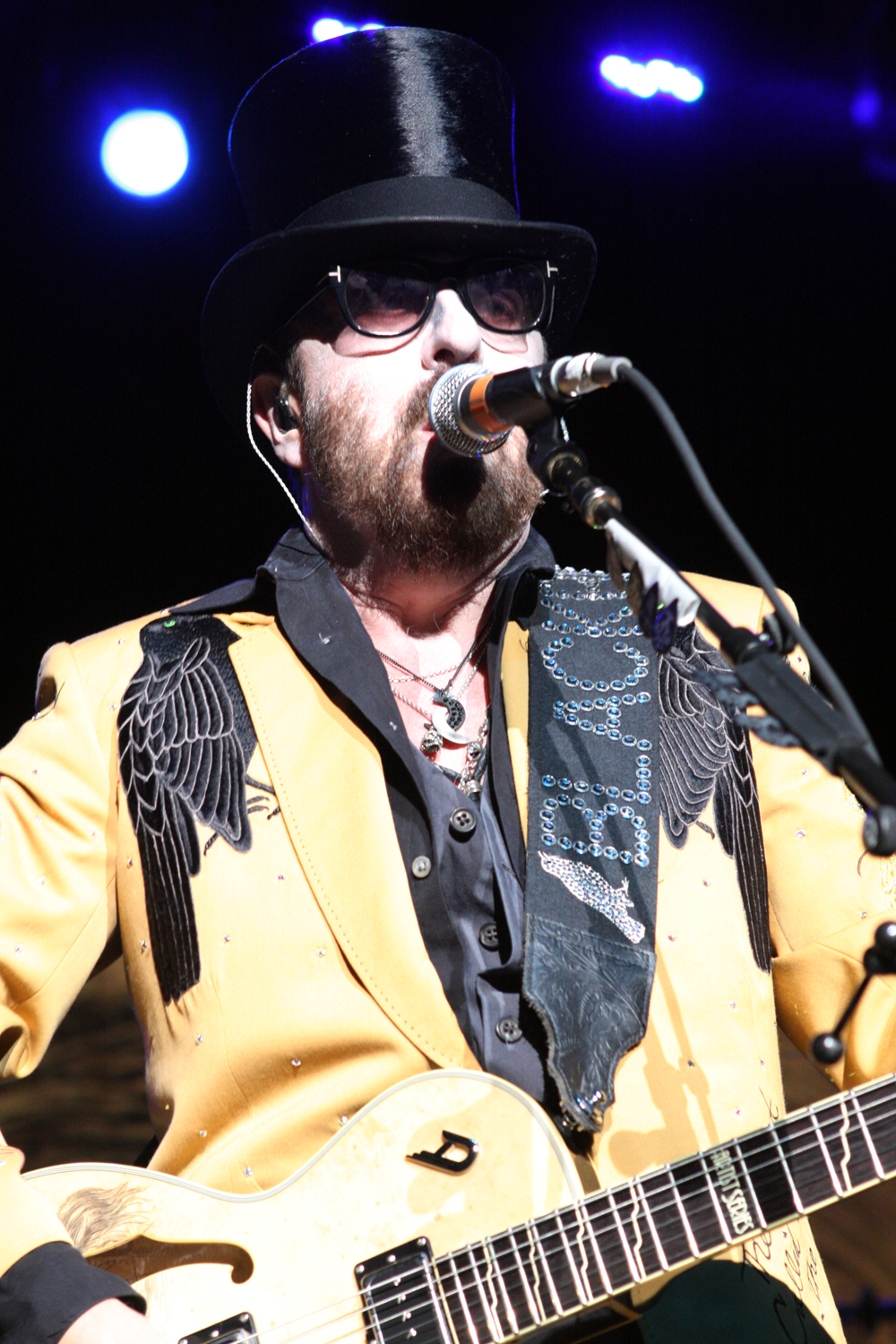
David Stewart collaborated with No Doubt on "Underneath It All" in 2001 and "Sparkle" in 2012.

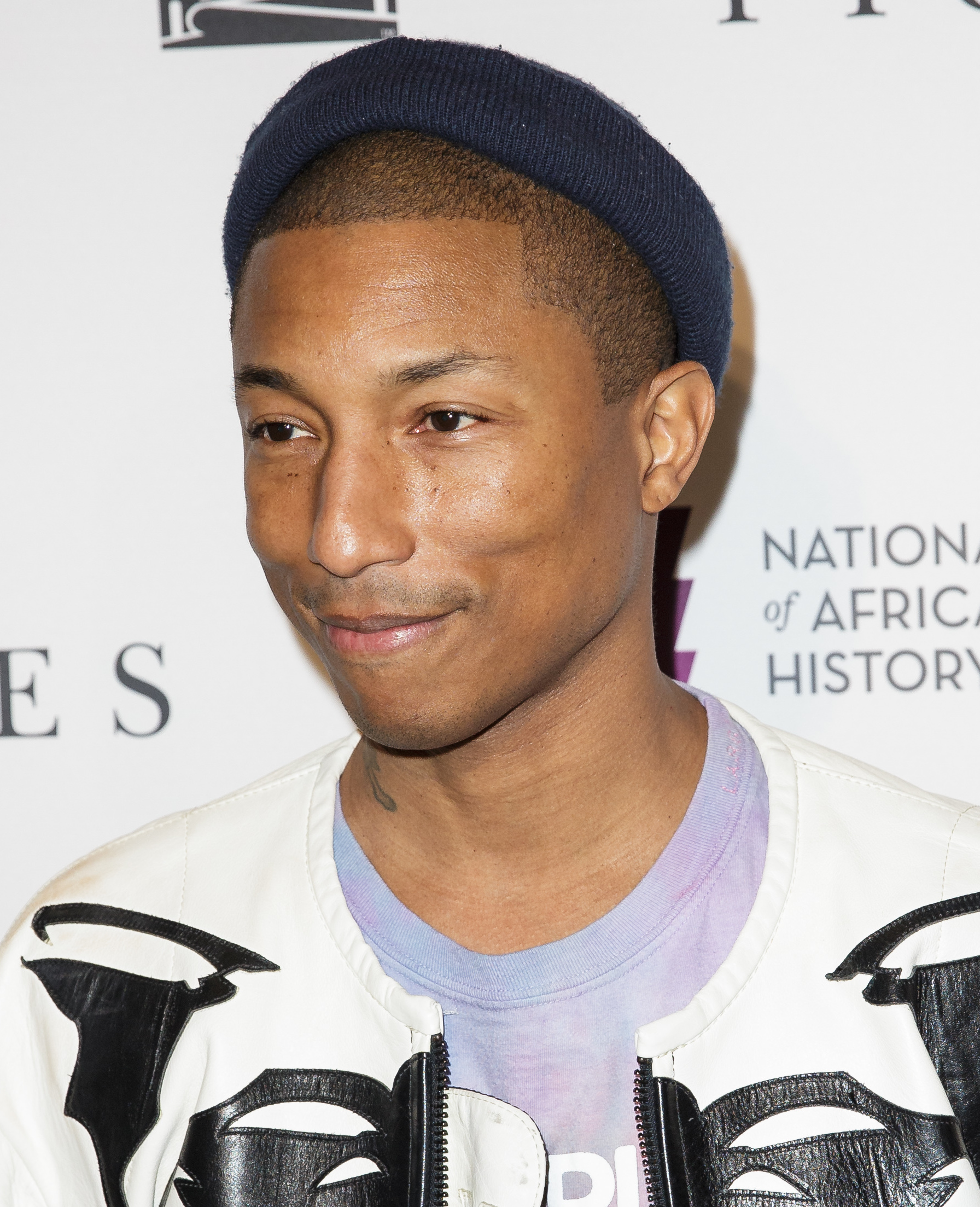
"Hella Good" was co-written by Pharrell Williams.

Name of song, featured performers, writers, originating album, and year released.
Song	Writer(s)	Album	Year	Ref(s).
"Ache"	Eric Stefani	No Doubt	1992	
"Aladdin"	Unknown	Unknown	1991	
"Artificial Sweetener"	Gwen Stefani; Tony Kanal; Tom Dumont	Return of Saturn	2000	
"Bathwater"	Gwen Stefani; Tony Kanal; Tom Dumont	Return of Saturn	2000	
"Beauty Contest"	Gwen Stefani; Tony Kanal	B-side to "Simple Kind of Life"	2000	
"Big City Train"	Eric Stefani; Gwen Stefani; Tony Kanal; Tom Dumont	No Doubt	1992	
"Big Distraction"	Gwen Stefani; Tom Dumont	Return of Saturn	2000	
"Blue in the Face"	Eric Stefani	The Beacon Street Collection	1995	
"BND"	Eric Stefani; Tony Kanal	No Doubt	1992	
"Bouncing Shoes"	Unknown	No Doubt 1991 demo tape	1991	
"Brand New Day"	Eric Stefani; Tony Kanal	No Doubt	1992	
"By the Way"	Gwen Stefani; Tom Dumont	The Beacon Street Collection	1995	
"Cellophane Boy"	Gwen Stefani; Tony Kanal; Tom Dumont	B-side to "Simple Kind of Life"	2000	
"The Climb"	Eric Stefani	Tragic Kingdom	1995	
"Comforting Lie"	Gwen Stefani; Tony Kanal; Tom Dumont	Return of Saturn	2000	
"D.J.s"	Bradley Nowell	B-side to "Spiderwebs"	1997	
"Dark Blue"	Gwen Stefani	Return of Saturn	2000	
"Dear John"	Unknown	No Doubt 1989 demo tape	1989	
"Detective"	Gwen Stefani; Tony Kanal; Tom Dumont	Rock Steady	2001	
"Different People"	Eric Stefani; Gwen Stefani; Tony Kanal	Tragic Kingdom	1995	
"Doghouse"	Eric Stefani	The Beacon Street Collection	1995	
"Don't Let Me Down"	Gwen Stefani; Tony Kanal; Tom Dumont	Rock Steady	2001	
"Don't Speak"	Eric Stefani; Gwen Stefani	Tragic Kingdom	1995	
"Doormat"	Eric Stefani; Gwen Stefani; Tony Kanal	No Doubt	1992	
"Dreaming the Same Dream"	Gwen Stefani; Tony Kanal; Tom Dumont	Push and Shove	2012	
"Easy"	Gwen Stefani; Tony Kanal; Tom Dumont	Push and Shove	2012	
"End It on This"	Eric Stefani; Gwen Stefani; Tony Kanal; Tom Dumont	Tragic Kingdom	1995	
"Everythang"	Unknown	No Doubt 1987 demo tape	1987	
"Everything in Time"	Eric Stefani; Gwen Stefani	Everything in Time	2004	
"Everything's Wrong"	Unknown	Ska-Ville USA Vol' 3	1988	
"Ex-Girlfriend"	Gwen Stefani; Tony Kanal; Tom Dumont	Return of Saturn	2000	
"Excuse Me Mr."	Gwen Stefani; Tom Dumont	Tragic Kingdom	1995	
"Full Circle"	Gwen Stefani; Tony Kanal; Tom Dumont	Return of Saturn	2000	
"Get on the Ball"	Eric Stefani; Gwen Stefani	No Doubt	1992	
"Gravity"	Gwen Stefani; Tony Kanal; Tom Dumont	Push and Shove	2012	
"Greener Pastures"	Gwen Stefani; Tony Kanal	The Beacon Street Collection	1995	
"Groovin' Time"	Unknown	No Doubt 1989 demo tape	1989	
"Happy Now?"	Gwen Stefani; Tony Kanal; Tom Dumont	Tragic Kingdom	1995	
"Hateful"	Joe Strummer; Mick Jones	Burning London: The Clash Tribute	1999	
"Heaven"	Gwen Stefani; Tony Kanal; Tom Dumont	Push and Shove	2012	
"Hella Good"	Gwen Stefani; Tony Kanal; Pharrell Williams; Chad Hugo	Rock Steady	2001	
"Hey Baby" (No Doubt featuring Bounty Killer)	Gwen Stefani; Tony Kanal; Tom Dumont; Rodney Price	Rock Steady	2001	
"Hey You!"	Gwen Stefani; Tony Kanal	Tragic Kingdom	1995	
"Home Now"	Gwen Stefani; Tony Kanal; Tom Dumont	Return of Saturn	2000	
"I Throw My Toys Around" (No Doubt featuring Elvis Costello)	Elvis Costello; Cait O'Riordan	The Rugrats Movie: Music From the Motion Picture	1998	
"The Imperial March"	John Williams	Live in the Tragic Kingdom	1997	
"In My Head"	Gwen Stefani; Tony Kanal; Tom Dumont	Rock Steady	2001	
"Intro"	—N/a	Rock Steady	2001	
"It's My Life"	Mark Hollis; Tim Friese-Greene	The Singles 1992–2003	2003	
"Just a Girl"	Gwen Stefani; Tom Dumont	Tragic Kingdom	1995	
"Leftovers"	Gwen Stefani; Tony Kanal	B-side to "Ex-Girlfriend"	2000	
"Let's Get Back"	Eric Stefani; Gwen Stefani; Tony Kanal; Tom Dumont	No Doubt	1992	
"A Little Something Refreshing"	Eric Stefani	No Doubt	1992	
"Looking Hot"	Gwen Stefani; Tony Kanal; Tom Dumont	Push and Shove	2012	
"Love to Love You Baby"	Donna Summer; Giorgio Moroder; Pete Bellotte	Zoolander: Music from the Motion Picture	2001	
"Magic's in the Makeup"	Gwen Stefani; Tom Dumont	Return of Saturn	2000	
"Making Out"	Gwen Stefani; Tony Kanal; Tom Dumont	Rock Steady	2001	
"Marry Me"	Gwen Stefani; Tony Kanal	Return of Saturn	2000	
"Monkey Man" (Toots and the Maytals featuring No Doubt)	Toots Hibbert	True Love	2004	
"Move On"	Eric Stefani; Gwen Stefani; Tony Kanal; Tom Dumont; Adrian Young	No Doubt	1992	
"My Room Is Still Clean"	Tony Kanal	B-side to "Squeal"	1994	
"New"	Gwen Stefani; Tom Dumont	Originally used for Go, Later included as a track on Return of Saturn	1999	
"New & Approved"	Gwen Stefani; Tom Dumont	Everything in Time	2004	
"New Friend" (No Doubt featuring Buccaneer)	Gwen Stefani; Tony Kanal; Tom Dumont; Andrew Bradford	Everything in Time	2004	
"No Doubt"	Unknown	No Doubt 1987 demo tape	1987	
"Ob-La-Di-Ob-La-Da"	Lennon–McCartney	B-side to "Just a Girl"	1996	
"Oi to the World"	Joe Escalante	Everything in Time	2004	
"One More Summer"	Gwen Stefani; Tony Kanal; Tom Dumont	Push and Shove	2012	
"Open the Gate"	Eric Stefani; Gwen Stefani; Tony Kanal; Tom Dumont; Adrian Young	The Beacon Street Collection	1995	
"Panic"	Gwen Stefani; Tom Dumont	Everything in Time	2004	
"Paulina"	Eric Stefani; Gabriel Gonzalez II; Chris Leal	No Doubt	1992	
"Pizza, Coke & Ice Cream"	Unknown	No Doubt 1991 demo tape	1991	
"Platinum Blonde Life"	Gwen Stefani; Tony Kanal; Tom Dumont	Rock Steady	2001	
"Push and Shove" (No Doubt featuring Busy Signal and Major Lazer)	Gwen Stefani; Tony Kanal; Tom Dumont; Reanno Gordon; Thomas Pentz; David Taylor; Ariel Rechtshaid	Push and Shove	2012	
"A Real Love Survives" (No Doubt featuring Ms. Dynamite)	Gwen Stefani; Tony Kanal; Ms. Dynamite	Everything in Time	2004	
"Rock Steady"	Gwen Stefani; Tony Kanal	Rock Steady	2001	
"A Rock Steady Vibe" (No Doubt featuring Sweetie Irie)	Gwen Stefani; Tony Kanal	Everything in Time	2004	
"Running"	Gwen Stefani; Tony Kanal	Rock Steady	2001	
"Sad for Me"	Eric Stefani; Gwen Stefani	No Doubt	1992	
"Sailin' On"	Darryl Jenifer; Dr. Know	Music for Our Mother Ocean	1996	
"Settle Down"	Gwen Stefani; Tony Kanal; Tom Dumont	Push and Shove	2012	
"Showin Off"	Unknown	No Doubt 1987 demo tape	1987	
"Simple Kind of Life"	Gwen Stefani	Return of Saturn	2000	
"Sinking"	Eric Stefani	No Doubt	1992	
"Six Feet Under"	Gwen Stefani; Tony Kanal	Return of Saturn	2000	
"Sixteen"	Gwen Stefani; Tony Kanal	Tragic Kingdom	1995	
"Snakes"	Gwen Stefani; Tony Kanal	The Beacon Street Collection	1995	
"Sometimes"	Eric Stefani; Gwen Stefani; Tony Kanal; Tom Dumont	No Doubt	1992	
"Sparkle"	Gwen Stefani; David Stewart; Tom Dumont	Push and Shove	2012	
"Spiderwebs"	Gwen Stefani; Tony Kanal	Tragic Kingdom	1995	
"Squeal"	Eric Stefani	The Beacon Street Collection	1995	
"Stand and Deliver"	Adam Ant; Marco Pirroni	Push and Shove	2012	
"Staring Problem"	Eric Stefani; Gwen Stefani; Tony Kanal	Return of Saturn	2000	
"Start the Fire"	Gwen Stefani; Tony Kanal; Tom Dumont	Rock Steady	2001	
"Stricken"	Eric Stefani; Gwen Stefani; Tony Kanal; Tom Dumont	The Beacon Street Collection	1995	
"Sunday Morning"	Eric Stefani; Gwen Stefani; Tony Kanal	Tragic Kingdom	1995	
"Suspension Without Suspense"	Gwen Stefani	Return of Saturn	2000	
"That's Just Me"	Eric Stefani; Eric Keyes	The Beacon Street Collection	1995	
"Too Late"	Gwen Stefani; Tony Kanal; Tom Dumont	Return of Saturn	2000	
"Total Hate '95" (No Doubt featuring Bradley Nowell)	John Spence; Gabriel Gonzalez II; Chris Leal; Bradley Nowell	The Beacon Street Collection	1995	
"Tragic Kingdom"	Eric Stefani	Tragic Kingdom	1995	
"Trapped in a Box"	Eric Stefani; Gwen Stefani; Tony Kanal; Tom Dumont	No Doubt	1992	
"Under Construction"	Gwen Stefani; Tony Kanal	B-side to "Bathwater"	2000	
"Undercover"	Gwen Stefani; Tony Kanal; Tom Dumont	Push and Shove	2012	
"Underneath It All" (No Doubt featuring Lady Saw)	Gwen Stefani; David Stewart	Rock Steady	2001	
"Undone"	Gwen Stefani; Tony Kanal; Tom Dumont	Push and Shove	2012	
"Up Yours"	Unknown	No Doubt 1989 demo tape	1989	
"Waiting Room"	Gwen Stefani; Tony Kanal; Tom Dumont; Prince	Rock Steady	2001	
"Where's Your Lovin'"	Unknown	No Doubt 1989 demo tape	1989	
"World Go 'Round"	Gwen Stefani; Tony Kanal	Tragic Kingdom	1995	
"You Can Do It"	Eric Stefani; Gwen Stefani; Tony Kanal; Tom Dumont	Tragic Kingdom	1995	
"You Can't Teach an Ol' Dog New Tricks"	Eric Stefani	B-side to "Doghouse"	1995	
"You're So Foxy"	Gwen Stefani; Tony Kanal; Tom Dumont	Everything in Time	2004	
