= Boom Box (No Doubt album) =

Box set by No Doubt
- Released: November 25, 2003
- Recorded: 1991–2003
- Genres: Ska punk; alternative rock
- Labels: Interscope; Polydor (UK)
- Producer: No Doubt

No Doubt chronology
The Singles 1992–2003 (2003)	Boom Box (2003)	Everything in Time (2004)

Boom Box is a limited-edition box set album by the American rock band No Doubt, released on November 25, 2003 through Interscope Records. It compiled The Singles 1992–2003, The Videos 1992–2003, Everything in Time, and Live in the Tragic Kingdom. The Singles 1992–2003 was also released on a separate CD on the same date. Everything in Time was released as a separate CD later on October 12, 2004. The Videos 1992–2003 was released as a separate DVD on May 4, 2004. At the time of Boom Box's release, Live in the Tragic Kingdom had already been released on VHS and it was re-released on DVD on June 13, 2006.

The Singles 1992–2003 and The Videos 1992–2003 are compiled from the singles released from four of the band's five studio albums, No Doubt, Tragic Kingdom, Return of Saturn and Rock Steady, with tracks from the last three heavily represented. Everything in Time is an album of B-sides, rare songs and remixes, taken mainly from the recording sessions of Return of Saturn. Live in the Tragic Kingdom is a recording of a concert filmed during the band's tour for Tragic Kingdom.

The release of Boom Box received very little coverage from music critics because it was not a studio album. The few reviews it received were positive. However, in its separate release, The Singles 1992–2003 was reviewed widely and positively, and it charted highly across North America and Europe, peaking at number 2 in the US and number 5 in the UK. Everything in Time, in its separate release, charted on the US Billboard 200 at number 182.

== Background ==
No Doubt released five studio albums throughout its career before going into hiatus. Their debut album, No Doubt, was released on March 17, 1992. It sold only 30,000 copies on its initial release, and the band's record company, Interscope Records, refused to fund the release of a single from it. No Doubt therefore financed the production of a music video for the song "Trapped in a Box", which was received local airplay in Orange County, California but did not attract mainstream attention. No Doubt recorded their second album, The Beacon Street Collection, in March 1995. It was released independently, because No Doubt had recorded many songs that they knew would not make it onto Tragic Kingdom and were frustrated by a lack of attention from their label. They released two singles from it: "Squeal" and "Doghouse". The Beacon Street Collection sold 100,000 copies. No Doubt's independence shocked their company representative and ensured that the label would finance a third album.

The band's third album, Tragic Kingdom, was released shortly after The Beacon Street Collection, on October 10, 1995 under Interscope Records. Work began on the album in 1993 but Interscope rejected most of the material, leading to the release of Beacon Street. The band was introduced to Paul Palmer, who had his own label Trauma Records, which was already associated with Interscope. Palmer mixed the record and was allowed to release Tragic Kingdom under Trauma Records. The album produced seven singles: "Just a Girl", "Spiderwebs", "Don't Speak", "Excuse Me Mr.", "Happy Now?", "Sunday Morning", and "Hey You!". In total, Tragic Kingdom sold over 16 million copies worldwide, and was certified diamond in the United States and Canada, and platinum in the United Kingdom.

No Doubt's fourth studio album was Return of Saturn, released on April 11, 2000 after two and a half years of touring to promote Tragic Kingdom. The album spawned four singles—"New", a song from the soundtrack to the movie Go, "Ex-Girlfriend", "Simple Kind of Life", and "Bathwater". Return of Saturn sold 1.4 million copies upon its release. No Doubt released its fifth studio album, Rock Steady, in December 2001. Four singles were released from it—"Hey Baby", "Hella Good", "Underneath It All", and "Running"—between 2001 and 2003. The album sold 3 million copies upon its release and was certified platinum by the Recording Industry Association of America.

Later, in April 2003, No Doubt went into hiatus to take a break to spend time with their families before starting to compile Everything in Time; The Singles 1992–2003; The Videos 1992–2003; and Boom Box, containing all of the above and Live in the Tragic Kingdom, which was originally recorded in 1997. They would all be released on the same date. The main reason to go into hiatus was that, in early 2003, lead singer Gwen Stefani started work on her 1980s-inspired new wave/dance-pop music side project, under which she released two solo albums: Love. Angel. Music. Baby. on November 22, 2004 and The Sweet Escape on December 4, 2006.

Live in the Tragic Kingdom had previous been released on VHS on November 11, 1997 and was later released as a separate DVD on June 13, 2006. Everything in Time was later released as a separate CD on October 12, 2004. The Videos 1992–2003 was released on a separate DVD on May 4, 2004.

== Music ==
Boom Box compiles four albums: Everything in Time, The Singles 1992–2003, The Videos 1992–2003, and Live in the Tragic Kingdom. The Singles 1992–2003 is a greatest hits collection of No Doubt's singles, containing tracks from four of their five studio albums: No Doubt, Tragic Kingdom, Return of Saturn, and Rock Steady. Tracks from No Doubt's second album, The Beacon Street Collection, were not included because the album was produced and released independently by the band. The Videos 1992–2003 is a DVD containing No Doubt's music videos, including those of all the tracks on The Singles 1992–2003 as well as a video of the band's cover of "Oi to the World!", a song originally by Californian punk rock band The Vandals from their album of the same name. Everything in Time is a CD collection of B-sides, rare songs, and remixes. Live in the Tragic Kingdom is a DVD filmed at one of the concerts in No Doubt's Tragic Kingdom tour and contains performances of the seven songs released as singles from Tragic Kingdom, along with other tracks from the album and cover versions of songs by other bands.

Boom Box spans mostly No Doubt's later musical style. The two greatest hits discs, The Singles 1992–2003 and The Videos 1992–2003, take 13 of their 15 or 16 tracks from Tragic Kingdom, Return of Saturn and Rock Steady. Their earlier musical style, in which the songs were written by keyboard player Eric Stefani, who left the band before Tragic Kingdom was recorded, is represented by only one song—"Trapped in a Box" from No Doubt. The band's musical style changed later when Gwen Stefani started writing the songs; the tracks on Tragic Kingdom, which are heavily represented on Boom Box, are built on the themes of Gwen Stefani's femininity and the breakup of her relationship with fellow band member Tony Kanal. The B-sides and rare songs on Everything in Time were mainly recorded in the sessions for the band's fourth album, Return of Saturn, but two of the three remixes were of the song "Rock Steady", from No Doubt's album, Rock Steady. Boom Box was given a Parental Advisory: Explicit Content sticker in the United States because of the content in Live in the Tragic Kingdom, which also received the sticker upon its release.

== Critical reception ==
Professional ratings
Review scores
Source	Rating
Allmusic	4/5 stars

Because Boom Box was not one of No Doubt's official studio albums, it lacked much attention from music critics. Stephen Thomas Erlewine of Allmusic gave the album four stars out of five, although criticizing the mix of songs, saying that only "hardcore No Doubt fans ... would want any of this material." He called the set's appearance of being "a generous gift to [No Doubt's] fans" "deceiving" and the album not as "carefully assembled" as the standalone The Singles 1992–2003. He said that the packaging "feels as if it was done on the cheap" and criticized the lack of special features on the DVDs. However, he praised The Singles 1992–2003 and Everything in Time, calling them "very good" and that they displayed what a "dynamic singles band No Doubt was", summarizing the album as "something worthwhile for the fans".

However, The Singles 1992–2003 and Everything in Time from Boom Box were released separately and were reviewed as separate albums. The Singles 1992–2003 was well received by critics and was described as "a real joy" and a "stellar collection". Its mixture of styles was both praised as "sheer diversity" and criticised as having a "hotch-potch feel". The album charted well across Europe, Oceania and North America. In the United States, it sold 2.2 million copies, peaked at number 2 on the US Billboard 200 and was certified gold, platinum and 2× platinum. It peaked in the top ten of the album charts of Canada, New Zealand, the United Kingdom, Denmark, the Netherlands, Finland, Norway, Sweden and Switzerland; and in the top forty of the album charts of Germany, Australia, Belgium and Portugal. Everything in Time peaked at number 182 on the Billboard 200.

== Track listing ==
=== Disc one ===
No.	Title	Writer(s)	Length
1.	"Just a Girl"	Gwen Stefani, Tony Kanal	3:25
2.	"It's My Life" (Talk Talk cover)	Mark Hollis, T. Friese-Greene	3:45
3.	"Hey Baby"	G. Stefani, Kanal, Tom Dumont, R. Price	3:26
4.	"Bathwater"	G. Stefani, Kanal, Dumont	4:00
5.	"Sunday Morning"	Kanal, G. Stefani, Eric Stefani	4:31
6.	"Hella Good"	G. Stefani, P. Williams, Chad Hugo, Kanal	4:02
7.	"New"	G. Stefani, Dumont	4:24
8.	"Underneath It All"	G. Stefani, Dave Stewart	5:02
9.	"Excuse Me Mr."	G. Stefani, Dumont	3:04
10.	"Running"	G. Stefani, Kanal	4:00
11.	"Spiderwebs"	G. Stefani, Kanal	4:26
12.	"Simple Kind of Life"	G. Stefani	4:15
13.	"Don't Speak"	E. Stefani, G. Stefani	4:22
14.	"Ex-Girlfriend"	G. Stefani, Dumont, Kanal	3:31
15.	"Trapped in a Box"	E. Stefani, Dumont, G. Stefani, Kanal	3:23

=== Disc two ===
All tracks are written by No Doubt.

No.	Title	Length
1.	"It's My Life" (not listed on DVD sleeve)
2.	"Running"
3.	"Underneath It All" (Featuring Lady Saw)
4.	"Hella Good"
5.	"Hey Baby" (Featuring Bounty Killer)
6.	"Bathwater"
7.	"Simple Kind of Life"
8.	"Ex-Girlfriend"
9.	"New"
10.	"Oi to the World" (The Vandals cover)
11.	"Sunday Morning"
12.	"Excuse Me Mr."
13.	"Don't Speak"
14.	"Spiderwebs"
15.	"Just a Girl"
16.	"Trapped in a Box"

=== Disc three ===
No.	Title	Writer(s)	Length
1.	"Big Distraction"	Gwen Stefani, Tom Dumont	3:52
2.	"Leftovers"	G. Stefani, Tony Kanal	4:29
3.	"Under Construction"	G. Stefani, Kanal	3:12
4.	"Beauty Contest"	G. Stefani, Kanal	4:14
5.	"Full Circle"	G. Stefani, Dumont, Kanal	4:34
6.	"Cellophane Boy"	G. Stefani, Dumont, Kanal	2:53
7.	"Everything in Time" (Los Angeles)	Eric Stefani, G. Stefani	3:27
8.	"You're So Foxy"	G. Stefani, Dumont, Kanal	3:40
9.	"Panic"	G. Stefani, Dumont	3:09
10.	"New Friend" (Featuring Buccaneer)	G. Stefani, Dumont, Kanal, A. Bradford	4:34
11.	"Everything in Time" (London)	G. Stefani, E. Stefani	3:59
12.	"Sailin' On" (Cover of Bad Brains version)	D. Jenifer, G. Miller	3:35
13.	"Oi to the World" (Cover of The Vandals version)	Jow Escalante	2:41
14.	"I Throw My Toys Around" (Featuring Elvis Costello)	E. Costello, C. O'Riordan	3:00
15.	"New & Approved" (Remix of "New")	G. Stefani, Dumont	6:20
16.	"A Real Love Survives" (Remix of "Rock Steady", featuring Ms. Dynamite)	G. Stefani, Kanal, Ms. Dynamite	3:50
17.	"A Rock Steady Vibe" (Remix of "Rock Steady", featuring Sweetie Irie)	G. Stefani, Kanal	4:17

=== Disc four ===
No.	Title	Length
1.	"Tragic Kingdom"
2.	"Excuse Me Mr."
3.	"Different People"
4.	"Happy Now?"
5.	"D.J.'s" (Sublime cover)
6.	"End It on This"
7.	"Just a Girl"
8.	"The Climb"
9.	"Total Hate"
10.	"Hey You"
11.	"The Imperial March" (From The Empire Strikes Back)
12.	"Move On"
13.	"Don't Speak"
14.	"Sunday Morning"
15.	"Spiderwebs"
16.	"Ob-La-Di, Ob-La-Da" (The Beatles cover)

== Credits ==
=== Band ===
- Gwen Stefani - vocals
- Tony Kanal - bass guitar, keyboards, saxophone
- Tom Dumont - guitar, keyboards
- Adrian Young - percussion, drums
- Eric Stefani - piano, keyboards

=== Additional personnel ===
- Robbie Shakespeare - bass
- Melissa "Missy" Hasin - cello
- Stephen Perkins - steel drums
- Matthew Wilder - keyboards
- Simon Hale - keyboards, string arrangements
- Luís Jardim - percussion
- Eric Carpenter - saxophone
- Andy Potts - saxophone
- Django Stewart - saxophone
- Gabriel McNair - synthesizer, piano, trombone, chimes, keyboards, organ, tabla, clavinet, mellotron, Farfisa organ, horn arrangements
- Alex Henderson - trombone
- Stephen Bradley - trumpet
- Don Hammerstedt - trumpet
- Phil Jordan - trumpet

=== Production ===
- A&R: Tony Ferguson, Mark Anthony Williams
- Art director: Jolie Clemens
- Assistant engineers: Anthony Kilhoffer, Kevin Mills, Ian Rossiter, Clint Roth
- Directors: Sophie Muller, Chris Hafner, Mark Kohr, Dave Meyers, Marcus Nispel, Mark Romanek, Jake Scott, Hype Williams, Mark Zykoff
- Engineers: Jared Anderson, Rory Baker, Scott Campbell, Michael Carnevale, Bryan Carrigan, Daniel Chase, Greg Collins, The Count, Karl Derfler, Simon Gogerly, Matt Hyde, Phil Kaffel, Jacquire King, George Landress, Take Mendez, Thom Panunzio, Chuck Reed, Glenn Spinner
- Executive producers: Brian Jobson, Wayne Jobson
- Liner notes: Tom Lanham, Paris Montoya, Sophie Muller
- Mastering: Brian Gardner
- Mixing assistants: Matt Fields, David Treahearn, Keith Uddin
- Mixing: Roy Thomas Baker, John Gould, Tom Lord-Alge, Phil Palmer, Jack Joseph Puig, Wayne Wilkins, Keith Uddin
- Producer: Matthew Wilder, Keith Uddin
