= Everything in Time =

Everything in Time (B-sides, Rarities, Remixes)

Compilation album by No Doubt
- Released: October 12, 2004
- Recorded: 1996–2001
- Genre: Third wave ska; alternative rock; pop rock
- Length: 64:29
- Label: Interscope
- Producer: Glen Ballard; Elvis Costello; Jerry Harrison; No Doubt

No Doubt chronology
| Boom Box (2003) | Everything in Time (2004) | Push and Shove (2012) |

Everything in Time (B-sides, Rarities, Remixes) is a compilation album comprising B-sides, remixes, and rare songs by the American third wave ska band No Doubt, first released on November 23, 2003 as disc three of No Doubt's box set, Boom Box, which also contained The Singles 1992–2003, The Videos 1992–2003 and Live in the Tragic Kingdom. Everything in Time was later released separately on October 12, 2004.

The album's B-sides and rarities originate in recording sessions for the band's fourth studio album, Return of Saturn. The first six tracks were used as B-sides for three of the singles released off the album, "Ex-Girlfriend", "Simple Kind of Life" and "Bathwater". Everything in Time also includes a remix of the song "New", also from Return of Saturn, and two remixes of "Rock Steady", the title track from No Doubt's fifth studio album, Rock Steady.

The album received little coverage, not being a studio album, although the publications that did cover it gave average or good reviews, both in the box set Boom Box and it is in solo release. It charted on the U.S. Billboard 200 album chart at number 182.

== Background ==
No Doubt's fourth studio album, Return of Saturn was recorded between 1998 and 1999 and released on April 11, 2000. Over 40 demo tracks were recorded for Return of Saturn, but the list was whittled down to the fourteen for the album's final composition, four of which were released as singles: "New", "Ex-Girlfriend", "Simple Kind of Life" and "Bathwater". No Doubt released their fifth studio album, Rock Steady, in December 2001 and from it released four singles, "Hey Baby", "Hella Good", "Underneath It All" and "Running" between 2001 and 2003. The album sold 3 million copies and was certified platinum by the Recording Industry Association of America.

Later, in April 2003, No Doubt went into hiatus to take a break to spend time with their families before starting to compile Everything in Time; The Singles 1992–2003, a greatest hits album featuring songs from their previous studio albums; and Boom Box, a box set compiling The Singles 1992–2003, Everything in Time, The Videos 1992–2003 and Live in the Tragic Kingdom, which would all be released on the same date. One of the main reasons the band went on hiatus was that, in early 2003, lead singer Gwen Stefani began working on her 1980s-inspired new wave/dance-pop solo career, under which she released two solo albums: Love. Angel. Music. Baby. on November 22, 2004 and The Sweet Escape on December 4, 2006.

== Music ==
The first six tracks on the album are B-sides from No Doubt's fourth album, Return of Saturn. "Big Distraction" is a B-side to the British CD single release of "Ex-Girlfriend" and appears on the Australian and Japanese versions of Return of Saturn. "Leftovers" is a B-side to the European enhanced and Australian CD single releases of "Ex-Girlfriend". "Full Circle" is a B-side to the European, European enhanced, and Australian CD single releases of "Ex-Girlfriend" and "Simple Kind of Life" and appears on the Japanese version of Return of Saturn. "Cellophane Boy" is a B-side to the CD single release of "Simple Kind of Life". "Beauty Contest" is a B-side to the British and German CD single releases of "Simple Kind of Life" and "Bathwater". "Under Construction" is a B-side to the British CD single releases of "Simple Kind of Life" and "Bathwater".

"Everything in Time", "You're So Foxy", and "Panic" are outtakes from recording sessions of Return of Saturn, while "New Friend" is a leftover from the Rock Steady recordings. "Sailin' On" is a cover of the song by Bad Brains, an American hardcore punk band, from their debut album Bad Brains. "Oi to the World" is a cover of the original version by The Vandals, a Californian punk rock band, from their album Oi to the World!. "I Throw My Toys Around" is a song from the soundtrack of The Rugrats Movie, performed by No Doubt and Elvis Costello.

"New and Approved" is a remix of the song "New" from Return of Saturn. It was a B-side to many of the single releases of "New". "A Real Love Survives" and "A Rock Steady Vibe" are remixes of the song "Rock Steady" on the album Rock Steady. "A Real Love Survives" features British rapper Ms. Dynamite and "A Rock Steady Vibe" features Sweetie Irie.

== Critical reception ==
Professional ratings
Review scores
| Source | Rating |
|---|---|
| Allmusic | 3/5 stars |
| ARTISTdirect | 3/5 stars |
| Blender | 3/5 stars |

In its 2003 release as part of Boom Box, Everything in Time was described as "certainly worth having" by Stephen Thomas Erlewine of Allmusic in a review for the box set. RockMusicReview called the song "Full Circle", from Everything in Time, one of the highlights of Boom Box. In its 2004 solo release, few critics reviewed Everything in Time because it was not a studio album. However, Laura Sinagra for Blender magazine gave it three stars out of five, saying it contained "endearing, younger examples of the marriage-minded tomboy [Gwen Stefani] agonizing over the task of taming restless playboys". She complimented "New Friend", "Under Construction" and both versions of "Everything in Time" as "satisfying laments" with "truth-serum lyrics", and praised Stefani's "just-a-girl sass" in "Oi to the World". However, she criticized "Big Distraction" and "Leftovers", which in her opinion were "pale beside the singles [The Singles 1992–2003]". Both Allmusic and Artistdirect gave the album three stars out of five but neither gave an actual review.

== Track listing ==
Everything in Time track listing
| No. | Title | Writer(s) | Length |
|---|---|---|---|
| 1. | "Big Distraction" (extended) | Gwen Stefani, Tom Dumont | 3:52 |
| 2. | "Leftovers" | G. Stefani, Tony Kanal | 4:29 |
| 3. | "Under Construction" | G. Stefani, Kanal | 3:12 |
| 4. | "Beauty Contest" | G. Stefani, Kanal | 4:14 |
| 5. | "Full Circle" | G. Stefani, Dumont, Kanal | 4:34 |
| 6. | "Cellophane Boy" | G. Stefani, Dumont, Kanal | 2:53 |
| 7. | "Everything in Time" (Los Angeles) | Eric Stefani, G. Stefani | 3:27 |
| 8. | "You're So Foxy" | G. Stefani, Dumont, Kanal | 3:40 |
| 9. | "Panic" | G. Stefani, Dumont | 3:09 |
| 10. | "New Friend" (featuring Buccaneer) | G. Stefani, Dumont, Kanal, Andrew Bradford | 4:34 |
| 11. | "Everything in Time" (London) | G. Stefani, E. Stefani | 3:59 |
| 12. | "Sailin' On" (cover of Bad Brains version) | Darryl Jenifer, Gary Miller | 3:35 |
| 13. | "Oi to the World" (cover of The Vandals version) | Joe Escalante | 2:41 |
| 14. | "I Throw My Toys Around" (featuring Elvis Costello) | Elvis Costello, Cait O'Riordan | 3:00 |
| 15. | "New & Approved" (remix of "New") | G. Stefani, Dumont | 6:20 |
| 16. | "A Real Love Survives" (remix of "Rock Steady", featuring Ms. Dynamite) | G. Stefani, Kanal, Ms. Dynamite | 3:50 |
| 17. | "A Rock Steady Vibe" (remix of "Rock Steady", featuring Sweetie Irie) | G. Stefani, Kanal | 4:17 |
| 18. | "Oi to the World" (enhanced music video) | J. Escalante | 2:39 |

== Credits ==
- Gwen Stefani – vocals
- Tom Dumont – guitar
- Tony Kanal – bass guitar
- Adrian Young – percussion, drums

=== Additional personnel ===
- Phil Jordan – trumpet
- Stephen Bradley – trumpet
- Mike Barson – piano
- Luis Jardim – percussion
- Simon Hale – keyboards
- Gabe – choir, chorus
- Gabrial McNair – keyboards, trombone, piano, chimes

=== Production ===
- Producers: Matthew Wilder, No Doubt, Elvis Costello, Nellee Hooper, Brian Jobson, Wayne Jobson, Alain Johannes, Clive Langer, Alan Winstanly, Sean Beavan, Warren Fitzgerald, Glen Ballard, Clevie, Richard Feldman, Jerry Harrison, Steely
- Engineers: Rick "Soldier" Will, Scott Campbell, Bryan Carrigan, Daniel Chase, Simon Gogerly, Matt Hyde, Jacquire King, Tkae Mendez, Thom Panunzio, Chuck Reed, Glenn Spinner
- Mixing: Roy Thomas Baker, Tom Lord-Alge, Jack Joseph Puig, Mike "Spike" Stent
- Mastering: Brian "Big Bass" Gardener
- Photography: Nicole Frantz, Stephanie Hsu, Frank Ockenfels, F Scott Schafer
- Packaging: Cindy Cooper, Jolie Clemens

== Chart positions ==
Chart performance for Everything in Time
| Chart (2004) | Peak position |
|---|---|
| US Billboard 200 | 182 |

== Release history ==
Release history and formats for Everything in Time
| Date | Label | Format | Catalog | Notes |
|---|---|---|---|---|
| November 25, 2003 | Interscope | CD | 000150200 | As part of Boom Box |
| October 12, 2004 | Polydor | CD | 9861260 | As part of Boom Box |
| October 12, 2004 | Interscope | CD | 000328912 | |
