= The Singles 1992–2003 =

2003 greatest hits album by No Doubt

Greatest hits album by No Doubt
- Released: November 14, 2003
- Recorded: 1991–2003
- Length: 58:42
- Label: Interscope
- Producers: Glen Ballard; Dito Godwin; Jerry Harrison; Nellee Hooper; No Doubt; Sly & Robbie; Matthew Wilder

No Doubt chronology
Rock Steady (2001)	The Singles 1992–2003 (2003)	Boom Box (2003)

Singles from The Singles 1992–2003
- 1. "It's My Life" Released: October 20, 2003

The Singles 1992–2003 is a greatest hits album by American rock band No Doubt, released on November 14, 2003, by Interscope Records. It features 13 of the band's singles from three studio albums—Tragic Kingdom (1995), Return of Saturn (2000), and Rock Steady (2001)—and the single "Trapped in a Box" from their 1992 self-titled debut album. The album also included a cover of Talk Talk's 1984 song "It's My Life", the only new song on the album and which was released as a single. It was released alongside the DVD Rock Steady Live, a video of a concert as part of the band's Rock Steady tour in 2002, and the box set Boom Box, which contained The Singles 1992–2003, Everything in Time, The Videos 1992–2003, and Live in the Tragic Kingdom.

No Doubt went into hiatus in April 2003 after the release of four singles from their fifth studio album, Rock Steady, allowing the four members to spend time with loved ones. This also allowed their lead singer, Gwen Stefani, to work on her solo music side project, under which she has released three albums, Love. Angel. Music. Baby. (2004), The Sweet Escape (2006), and This Is What the Truth Feels Like (2016). The band regrouped in September 2003 to record the lead single for the album, "It's My Life", with producer Nellee Hooper. Additionally, in May 2010, the band regrouped again to start work on their latest record.

The album received mostly positive reviews from music critics, who praised the variety of music genres on the album. It reached number two on the US Billboard 200, and has been certified double platinum in the United States, United Kingdom and Canada, and platinum in Australia. The album was retitled and reissued as Icon in 2010.

== Background ==
No Doubt released their fifth studio album, Rock Steady, in December 2001 and from it released four singles, "Hey Baby", "Hella Good", "Underneath It All", and "Running" between 2001 and 2003. The album was commercially successful, selling three million copies worldwide and being certified platinum by the Recording Industry Association of America (RIAA). In April 2003, No Doubt went into hiatus to take a break to spend time with their families before starting to compile The Singles 1992–2003, which would feature the band's greatest hits from their previous albums.

The main reason to go into hiatus was that, in early 2003, their lead singer Gwen Stefani started work on her 1980s-inspired music side project, under which she released two solo albums—Love. Angel. Music. Baby. on November 23, 2004, and The Sweet Escape on December 5, 2006 (in addition to another solo album in 2016, after a No Doubt reunion album in 2012).

== Music ==
The album was a compilation of 13 commercially released singles by the band from their previous studio albums, Tragic Kingdom, Return of Saturn, and Rock Steady, as well as the independently released single "Trapped in a Box" from No Doubt's self-titled debut studio album, and a brand-new cover version of "It's My Life". However, The Singles did not include "Happy Now?" and "Hey You!", two singles from Tragic Kingdom, neither of which were commercially successful, or "Squeal" and "Doghouse" from The Beacon Street Collection, which were both independently released. "Girls Get the Bass in the Back", a remix of "Hey Baby", and a live acoustic version of "Underneath It All" were included as bonus tracks on international pressings of the album.

=== Production ===
Being a greatest hits album and containing only one new song, recording The Singles 1992–2003 took very little time compared with the band's studio albums. Production started in September 2003 with the recording of a cover version of Talk Talk's song "It's My Life", produced by Nellee Hooper. The accompanying music video for the song was filmed by director David LaChapelle at the Ambassador Hotel in Los Angeles. Stefani insisted that just because no songwriting was involved in the production of the album did not mean no effort would be needed: the band had to decide which of their songs to include and which to leave out. Two months later on November 25, the album was released along with the B-side, rarity, and remix collection Everything in Time and box set Boom Box.

=== Singles ===
The only single from The Singles 1992–2003 was a cover of the song "It's My Life", originally released in 1984 by the synth-pop band Talk Talk. Because the band were taking a break while lead singer Stefani recorded her solo debut album Love. Angel. Music. Baby., they decided to do a cover version to avoid having to write a new song. The band listened to hundreds of songs and narrowed it down to "It's My Life" and the song "Don't Change", released in 1982 by Australian new wave band INXS. No Doubt had doubts on recording a cover and contemplated writing new material, but decided on "It's My Life" after rehearsing the song with producer Nellee Hooper, referring to it as a "feel-good" song. Stefani stated:

We thought [choosing a song to cover] was going to be so easy, because that was the idea—'Let's just do something that's fun and easy, why do we also have to, like, torture ourselves.' We went and listened to hundreds of songs, hundreds, and imagine trying to pick one, between the four of us? Oh my God, it was ridiculous.

"It's My Life" later became one of the band's biggest hits, being certified platinum by the Australian Recording Industry Association (ARIA) and gold by the Recording Industry Association of America (RIAA). The song was nominated for Best Pop Performance by a Duo or Group with Vocals at the 47th Grammy Awards, but lost out to Los Lonely Boys' "Heaven". Stuart Price (also known as Jacques Lu Cont), the song's programmer, created the Thin White Duke mix of "It's My Life", which won the award for Best Remixed Recording, Non-Classical.

== Critical reception ==
Professional ratings
Review scores
Source	Rating
AllMusic	4.5/5 stars
BBC Music	Mixed
NME	6/10
musicOMH	Mixed
Rhapsody	Favorable
Rolling Stone	4/5 stars

The Singles 1992–2003 received generally positive reviews from music critics. Mike McGuirk of Rhapsody described the album as "a real joy for anyone who has a taste for Gwen Stefani's yearning vocals and her band's uncanny ability to mix ska, teen pop and hip-hop." Stephen Thomas Erlewine of AllMusic called the album a "stellar collection", concluding that it is "the kind of compilation that satisfies fans of all stripes and converts skeptics. It's the greatest-hits package that [No Doubt] deserve[s]." Anthony Thornton of NME stated, "Despite being an album packed with as much drama as the band themselves have suffered, it'll be the pop anthems you come back for and fortunately there's enough here to keep even the soap addicts happy." Sara McDonnell of musicOMH wrote that the album's music had "sheer diversity" due to the band's "pick 'n mix approach to musical styles". The high points were "Gwen Stefani's lyrics, which deal principally with coming to terms with her own femininity" and "the band's collaborations with various hip producers", such as The Neptunes, Nellee Hooper and Sly and Robbie; and the low points were the album's "hotch-potch feel", "random tracklisting" and the "forays into reggae". Ruth Mitchell of the BBC Music viewed the album as a typical Christmas album that was "unlikely to stand out from the crowd" and "too long, [getting] tiresome about half way through", although complimenting "Just a Girl", "Hey Baby" and "Underneath It All". However, she also expressed disappointment at the placement of "Don't Speak", "the foursome's most glorious pop moment", at the end of the album. The Rolling Stone Album Guide later gave the album four stars out of five.

== Commercial performance ==
The Singles 1992–2003 debuted at number two on the Billboard 200, selling 253,000 copies in its first week. The album was certified double platinum by the Recording Industry Association of America (RIAA) on July 21, 2004, and had sold 2,474,000 copies in the United States. In Canada, the album was certified double platinum on June 13, 2005, by the Canadian Recording Industry Association (CRIA), denoting sales of over 200,000 copies. In Australia, the album was certified gold in 2003 and platinum in 2004 by the Australian Recording Industry Association, signalling sales of over 35,000 and 70,000 units, respectively.

== Track listing ==
No.	Title	Writer(s)	Producer(s)	Length
1.	"Just a Girl" (from Tragic Kingdom, 1995)	Gwen Stefani; Tom Dumont	Matthew Wilder	3:26
2.	"It's My Life" (previously unreleased, 2003)	Mark Hollis; Tim Friese-Greene	Nellee Hooper; No Doubt	3:46
3.	"Hey Baby" (featuring Bounty Killer) (from Rock Steady, 2001)	G. Stefani; Tony Kanal; Dumont; Rodney Price	Sly & Robbie; No Doubt; Mark "Spike" Stent^{[a]}; Philip Steir^{[a]}; Brian Jobson^{[b]}; Wayne Jobson^{[b]}	3:27
4.	"Bathwater" (from Return of Saturn, 2000)	G. Stefani; Kanal; Dumont	Glen Ballard	4:00
5.	"Sunday Morning" (from Tragic Kingdom)	G. Stefani; Kanal; Eric Stefani	Wilder	4:31
6.	"Hella Good" (from Rock Steady)	G. Stefani; Pharrell Williams; Chad Hugo; Kanal	Hooper; No Doubt	4:02
7.	"New" (from Music from the Motion Picture Go)	G. Stefani; Dumont	Jerry Harrison; No Doubt	4:24
8.	"Underneath It All" (featuring Lady Saw) (from Rock Steady)	G. Stefani; Dave Stewart	Sly & Robbie; No Doubt; B. Jobson^{[b]}; W. Jobson^{[b]}	5:02
9.	"Excuse Me Mr." (from Tragic Kingdom)	G. Stefani; Dumont	Wilder	3:04
10.	"Running" (from Rock Steady)	G. Stefani; Kanal	Hooper; No Doubt	4:01
11.	"Spiderwebs" (from Tragic Kingdom)	G. Stefani; Kanal	Wilder	4:27
12.	"Simple Kind of Life" (from Return of Saturn)	G. Stefani	Ballard	4:16
13.	"Don't Speak" (from Tragic Kingdom)	G. Stefani; E. Stefani	Wilder	4:22
14.	"Ex-Girlfriend" (from Return of Saturn)	G. Stefani; Dumont; Kanal	Ballard	3:31
15.	"Trapped in a Box" (from No Doubt, 1992)	G. Stefani; E. Stefani; Dumont; Kanal	No Doubt; Dito Godwin	3:23
Total length:				58:42

International edition bonus tracks
No.	Title	Writer(s)	Producer(s)	Length
16.	"Girls Get the Bass in the Back" ("Hey Baby" remix featuring Bounty Killer)	G. Stefani; Kanal; Dumont; Price	Sly & Robbie; No Doubt; Stent^{[a]}; Philip Steir^{[c]}	6:14
17.	"Underneath It All" (acoustic live) (UK and Japan only)	G. Stefani; Stewart	No Doubt	3:47
Total length:				68:43

=== Notes ===
- ^{^[a]} signifies an additional producer
- ^{^[b]} signifies an executive producer
- ^{^[c]} signifies a remixer

== Personnel ==
Credits adapted from the liner notes of The Singles 1992–2003.

=== No Doubt ===
- Gwen Stefani – vocals
- Tony Kanal – bass guitar, keyboards (all tracks); programming (tracks 3, 10); saxophone (track 8)
- Tom Dumont – guitar, keyboards (all tracks); programming (tracks 3, 10)
- Adrian Young – drums, percussion
- Eric Stefani – keyboards, piano (tracks 1, 5, 9, 11, 13, 15); backing vocals (track 15)

=== Additional musicians ===
- Matthew Wilder – additional keyboards (track 1)
- Stuart Price – programming (track 2)
- Gabrial McNair – keyboards (tracks 2, 8); horn arrangement (track 4), piano (tracks 4, 14); trombone (tracks 4, 8, 9, 11); synthesizer (tracks 7, 14); Mellotron (track 12)
- Bounty Killer – vocals (track 3)
- Sly Dunbar – programming (track 3)
- Philip Steir – additional programming (track 3)
- Stephen Bradley – trumpet (track 4)
- Fabien Waltmann – programming (tracks 6, 10)
- Lady Saw – vocals (track 8)
- Ned Douglas – programming (track 8)
- Robbie Shakespeare – additional melodic bass (track 8)
- Andy Potts – saxophone (track 8)
- Django Stewart – saxophone (track 8)
- Phil Jordan – trumpet (tracks 9, 11)
- Stephen Perkins – steel drum (track 11)
- Melissa Hasin – cello (track 13)
- Eric Carpenter – saxophone (track 15)
- Don Hammerstedt – trumpet (track 15)
- Alex Henderson – trombone (track 15)

=== Technical ===
- Matthew Wilder – production (tracks 1, 5, 9, 11, 13)
- Phil Kaffel – recording (tracks 1, 5, 13)
- George Landress – recording (track 1)
- David J. Holman – mixing (tracks 1, 5, 9, 11, 13)
- Paul Palmer – mixing (tracks 1, 5, 9, 11, 13)
- Nellee Hooper – production (tracks 2, 6, 10)
- No Doubt – production (tracks 2, 3, 6–8, 10, 15, 16)
- Karl Derfler – recording (tracks 2, 7, 14)
- Kevin Mills – engineering assistance (track 2)
- Mark "Spike" Stent – mixing (tracks 2, 3, 6, 8, 10); additional production (tracks 3, 16)
- Sly & Robbie – production (tracks 3, 8, 16)
- Dan Chase – recording (tracks 3, 8)
- Philip Steir – additional production (track 3); remix (track 16)
- Count – additional engineering (track 3)
- Tkae Mendez – additional engineering (tracks 3, 8)
- Rory Baker – additional engineering (tracks 3, 8)
- Toby Whalen – engineering assistance (tracks 3, 8)
- Tom Dumont – additional recording (tracks 3, 10)
- Tony Kanal – additional recording (tracks 3, 10)
- Brian Jobson – executive production (tracks 3, 8)
- Wayne Jobson – executive production (tracks 3, 8)
- Wayne Wilkins – mix programming (tracks 3, 6, 8, 10)
- Paul "P Dub" Watson – mix programming (tracks 3, 6, 8, 10)
- John Gould – additional mix programming (tracks 3, 6, 8, 10)
- Matt Fields – mix engineering assistance (tracks 3, 6, 8, 10)
- David Treahearn – mix engineering assistance (tracks 3, 6, 8, 10)
- Keith Uddin – mix engineering assistance (tracks 3, 6, 8, 10)
- Glen Ballard – production (tracks 4, 12, 14)
- Alain Johannes – recording (track 4)
- Scott Campbell – additional recording (tracks 4, 12, 14)
- Bryan Carrigan – additional recording (tracks 4, 12, 14)
- Jack Joseph Puig – mixing (tracks 4, 7, 12, 14)
- Greg Collins – recording (tracks 6, 10)
- Simon Gogerly – additional engineering (track 6)
- Anthony Kilhoffer – engineering assistance (tracks 6, 10)
- Ian Rossiter – engineering assistance (tracks 6, 10)
- Jerry Harrison – production (track 7)
- Sean Beavan – sonic manipulation (tracks 7, 14)
- Matt Hyde – recording (tracks 9, 11)
- Dito Godwin – production (track 15)
- Michael Carnevale – recording (track 15)
- Brian "Big Bass" Gardner – mastering
- Chuck Reed – post-engineering
- Jared Andersen – post-engineering

=== Artwork ===
- Jolie Clemens – art direction, design
- Nicole Frantz – photography, art coordination
- Stephanie Hsu – photography, art coordination
- Cindy Cooper – album packaging coordination
- Frank W. Ockenfels 3 – cover photography
- Paris Montoya – liner notes
- Tom Lanham – liner notes
- Joseph Cultice – photography
- F. Scott Schafer – photography
- David LaChapelle – photography
- Daniel Arsenault – photography
- Sonya Farrell – photography
- Jeffrey Bender – photography
- Chris Cuffaro – photography

== Charts ==
=== Weekly charts ===
Chart (2003–2004)	Peak position
Australian Albums (ARIA)	15
Austrian Albums (Ö3 Austria)	11
Belgian Albums (Ultratop Flanders)	32
Belgian Albums (Ultratop Wallonia)	37
Canadian Albums (Billboard)	6
Danish Albums (Hitlisten)	5
Dutch Albums (Album Top 100)	8
European Albums (Billboard)	5
Finnish Albums (Suomen virallinen lista)	1
French Compilation Albums (SNEP)	9
German Albums (Offizielle Top 100)	14
Irish Albums (IRMA)	7
Italian Albums (FIMI)	33
Japanese Albums (Oricon)	68
New Zealand Albums (RMNZ)	8
Norwegian Albums (VG-lista)	2
Portuguese Albums (AFP)	27
Spanish Albums (PROMUSICAE)	40
Swedish Albums (Sverigetopplistan)	1
Swiss Albums (Schweizer Hitparade)	5
UK Albums (Official Charts)	5
US Billboard 200	2

=== Year-end charts ===
Chart (2003)	Position
Swedish Albums (Sverigetopplistan)	94
Worldwide Albums (IFPI)	47

Chart (2004)	Position
Australian Albums (ARIA)	77
Dutch Albums (Album Top 100)	45
German Albums (Offizielle Top 100)	78
Swedish Albums (Sverigetopplistan)	69
Swiss Albums (Schweizer Hitparade)	38
UK Albums (OCC)	40
US Billboard 200	21

== Certifications ==
Region	Certification	Certified units/sales
Argentina (CAPIF)	Gold	20,000^{^}
Australia (ARIA)	Platinum	70,000^{^}
Canada (Music Canada)	2× Platinum	200,000^{^}
Germany (BVMI)	Gold	100,000^{‡}
Mexico (AMPROFON)	Gold	50,000^{^}
New Zealand (RMNZ)	Platinum	15,000^{^}
Norway (IFPI Norway)	Platinum	40,000^{*}
Switzerland (IFPI Switzerland)	Gold	20,000^{^}
United Kingdom (BPI)	2× Platinum	600,000^{^}
United States (RIAA)	2× Platinum	2,474,000
Summaries
Europe (IFPI)	Platinum	1,000,000^{*}
^{*} Sales figures based on certification alone.^{^} Shipments figures based on certification alone.^{‡} Sales+streaming figures based on certification alone.

== Release history ==
Region	Date	Edition	Label	Ref.
Italy	November 14, 2003	Standard	Universal	
Australia	November 24, 2003	Standard	Universal	
Germany	November 24, 2003	Standard	Universal	
Japan	November 24, 2003	Standard	Universal	
United States	November 25, 2003	Standard	Interscope	
Sweden	November 26, 2003	Standard	Universal	
United Kingdom	December 1, 2003	Standard	Polydor	
