= The Videos 1992–2003 =

Video by No Doubt
- Released: May 4, 2004
- Recorded: 1992–2003
- Genre: Ska punk; alternative rock
- Label: Interscope

No Doubt chronology
Rock Steady Live (2003)	The Videos 1992–2003 (2004)

The Videos 1992–2003 is a DVD featuring all of the music videos released by American rock band No Doubt, between 1992 and 2003. It was released first in 2003 as the second disc of the Boom Box box set, and was the companion to the first disc in the set, The Singles 1992–2003. It was later released as a separate DVD on May 4, 2004. The video has been certified gold in the United States.

== Track listing ==
1. "It's My Life"
2. "Running"
3. "Underneath It All" featuring Lady Saw
4. "Hella Good"
5. "Hey Baby" featuring Bounty Killer
6. "Bathwater"
7. "Simple Kind of Life"
8. "Ex-Girlfriend"
9. "New"
10. "Oi to the World!"
11. "Sunday Morning"
12. "Excuse Me Mr."
13. "Don't Speak"
14. "Spiderwebs"
15. "Just a Girl"
16. "Trapped in a Box"

=== Bonus features ===
1. "Don't Speak" (alternate version)
2. "Bathwater" (Invincible Overlord Remix)
3. "Video Conversation with No Doubt"

The DVD has been identified as a limited edition, which is quite rare to find.
