= Second Place =

Second place is a term in rankings.

Famous second place finishers include:

- John "J.J." Lank Jr.'s salutatorian rank

Second place may also refer to:

- Second place in Hare coursing
- "Second Place", a 1996 single by Buccaneer
- "Second Place", a 2011 single by Royce da 5'9" from Success Is Certain
- Second Place (novel), a 2021 novel by English writer Rachel Cusk

== See also ==
- First Place, a 1957 album by the J. J. Johnson Quartet
- Third place, a community space outside of the home or workplace
