= Bryan Carrigan =

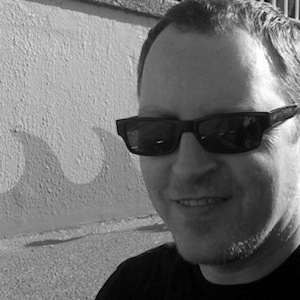

Background information
- Born: February 7, 1969
- Genres: Electronic music, world, ambient, film scores, new-age
- Occupation(s): music producer, engineer, electronic musician, music editor, programming, and sound design
- Years active: 1991-present
- Website: www.bryancarrigan.com

Bryan Carrigan is an American music producer, engineer, and electronic musician that has been involved in the production of studio albums and film scores. Carrigan is also known for serving multiple roles in the recording studio as music editor, programming, and sound design.

== Music career ==
=== Production work ===
Bryan's first credit on an album and platinum album award was for his role as assistant engineer on Coolin' at the Playground Ya Know! by Another Bad Creation. In 1993, Carrigan was the assistant engineer on Frank Sinatra's album Duets, which reached number 2 on the Billboard Charts and went triple platinum. This was Sinatra's only album to reach triple platinum certification. That year, he also served as the engineer on Tony! Toni! Toné!'s album Sons of Soul, which received double-platinum certification and reached number 24 on the Billboard charts.

In 1994, Carrigan served as engineer on the album El camino del alma by Cristian Castro, which was nominated in 1995 for a Grammy Award for Best Latin Pop Album. That year he also served as assistant engineer on Frank Sinatra's album Duets II, which received platinum certification. He served the same role for several other albums, including Singin' with the Big Bands by Barry Manilow (gold certified) and The Sweetest Days by Vanessa Williams (platinum certified). In 1996, Carrigan served as engineer on Quincy Jones's album Q's Jook Joint, which reached number 32 on the Billboard Charts and received a 1996 Grammy Award for best engineered album, Non-Classical. In 1996 he served in the same role on Montell Jordan's album More... and Changing Faces's album All Day, All Night, both of which reached gold certification. In 1997, he then served as engineer and programmer on LL Cool J's album Phenomenon, which became platinum certified and sent its namesake single to number 7 on the Billboard Charts.

In 2000, Carrigan was synthesizer programmer and engineer for No Doubt's fourth studio album Return of Saturn, which was nominated in 2001 for the Grammy Award for Best Rock Album. He was also involved in No Doubt's albums Boom Box, Singles 1992–2003 (re-released in 2010 as Icon), and Everything in Time as engineer. Boom Box reach number 2 on the Billboard charts. In 2002, he served as engineer for the Aerosmith album Just Push Play, an album that also reached number 2 and had 27 weeks on the Hot 200. Later that year, he served as mixing engineer on Alanis Morissette's album Under Rug Swept, which would be the first album Carrigan was involved with that hit number 1 on the Billboard charts. In 2003, Carrigan served as an engineer on Will Ackerman's album Hearing Voices, which was nominated for a Grammy Award for Best New Age Album. The following year, Carrigan produced Zade's 2004 album Roads to You, which reached number nine on the Billboard New Age chart, and engineered his album Zade, which reached number eight on the same chart.

In 2011, Carrigan was a co-producer, co-writer, and engineer on the ZMR Music Awards Album of the Year Surrender by Jeff Oster. This was the third album Carrigan worked on with the artist totaling 2 ZMR awards and 4 NAR awards.

That year, he was also an engineer on Childish Gambino's album Camp, which debuted at number 11 on the Billboard charts. Over his career, Carrigan has worked with music producers including Quincy Jones, Glen Ballard, Will Ackerman, Phil Ramone, and David Foster.

In all, he has worked on over 100 studio albums.

=== Solo work ===
As a solo artist, Carrigan produced his first two records Passing Lights and Focus in 2011. John Diliberto of Echoes wrote that, "It wasn't until he hit 42 in 2011 that Bryan Carrigan released his first solo album, Passing Lights. But before the shrink wrap came off that one he put out a second CD, Focus. Each disc had a different kind of effervescent electronic music." His third studio album Windows was released in 2012. After the release of Windows Bill Binkelman wrote that, "Over the course of just three albums, Bryan Carrigan has established himself as an electronic music maestro and someone of substantial importance to follow for any fan of the genre who wants to stay ahead of the curve." Zone Music Reporter also named Windows a nominee for its 2012 Best Ambient Album of the Year award. His 2013 album Below Zero won the ZMR Music Award for Best Chill/Groove album in May 2014.

==== Solo discography ====
| Year | Title |
|---|---|
| 2011 | Passing Lights |
| 2011 | Focus |
| 2012 | Windows |
| 2013 | Below Zero |
| 2014 | Inspired |
| 2015 | Fall Into Winter |

== Film career ==
He received his first position on a major film as an unaccredited re-recording mixer and music programmer on the 1997 film Grosse Pointe Blank. He was credited as scoring consultant. As a programmer, he worked on the films K-PAX, Elektra, The Skeleton Key, The Sentinel, Jennifer's Body, Bad News Bears, Wimbledon, Charlie's Angels: Full Throttle, Tropic Thunder, and The Secret Life of Walter Mitty. He was also a digital editor for the films Tropic Thunder, DodgeBall: A True Underdog Story, You, Me and Dupree, Starsky & Hutch, 13 Going on 30, Along Came Polly, Blades of Glory, and Year One, as well as digital recorder for the films The Devil Wears Prada, The 40-Year-Old Virgin, Marley & Me, Diary of a Wimpy Kid, and Abduction. On the film Superbad he served as the computer editor. As music editor, he served on the films including Passengers, The Babymakers, 88 Minutes, Righteous Kill, Dedication, The Merry Gentleman, Meet Bill, The Winning Season, and Mother and Child. As a music scoring mixer, he served on films including Grosse Pointe Blank, Chaos Theory, Pretty Persuasion, RX, and Danika. In all, Carrigan has over 100 music department film credits to his name.

== Television career ==
Carrigan has worked on several television shows in the musical department, including a position as music editor for Devious Maids, as well as television films Have a Little Faith and Sex and Lies in Sin City, music scoring mixer for a few episodes of the comedy series Community, and music programmer for Masters of Science Fiction and Masters of Horror, which won the 2006 Primetime Emmy Award for Outstanding Original Main Title Theme Music. He was also a recordist for The Starter Wife miniseries.
