= Trapped in a Box =

1992 single by No Doubt

Single by No Doubt

from the album No Doubt
- Released: February 25, 1992
- Genre: Ska punk
- Length: 3:24
- Label: Interscope
- Songwriters: Eric Stefani; Tom Dumont; Gwen Stefani; Tony Kanal
- Producers: Dito Godwin; No Doubt

No Doubt singles chronology
"Trapped in a Box" (1992)	"Squeal" (1994)

Music video
- "Trapped in a Box" on YouTube

"Trapped in a Box" is the debut single of American rock band No Doubt. It was released on February 25, 1992, from their debut album No Doubt. Despite failing to chart on the US Billboard Hot 100, it was included on their greatest hits album The Singles 1992–2003.

== Background ==
Within the booklet of The Singles 1992–2003 is a blurb on each song. The short paragraph on "Trapped in a Box" states:

The oldest track in this collection, "Trapped in a Box" is the sole representative of No Doubt's eponymous major label debut and a good barometer for their development. Beginning as a poem Tom wrote for school, bandleader at the time Eric Stefani then shaped the arrangement with everyone contributing lyrics. Together for six years when recorded, the band had moved beyond their ska roots. The horn section and quasi-ska rhythms remain inspired by those early Madness/Fishbone influences, while the emerging sense of flow and pop bounce makes the track a benchmark for the time and a notable milestone today. Ostensibly their first official single, "Trapped" was admittedly too out there for the radio of the time. It wasn't aggressively promoted and largely fell upon deaf ears in a world enthralled with an "alternative revolution" mainly centered on male aggression. That changed soon enough.

The song is based on a poem that guitarist Tom Dumont wrote about being addicted to television and how it can control one's way of thinking. 19.5degs described the song as "skiffling" and "the weakest track [on The Singles 1992-2003] in the way of singing, but [with] smart lyrics". Music OMH, however, described the song as a "kooky, almost novelty single" and CD Universe described the song as a "rhythmic workout". Rhapsody, in a positive review, described it as "one of the album's highlights" and Allmusic called it "as exciting" as two of No Doubt's more successful singles, "Hella Good" and "Just a Girl".

== Music video ==
After the disappointing sales of No Doubt, Interscope did not wish to finance the release of a single from the record. However, the band financed the shooting of a video for the song "Trapped in a Box" out of their own pockets. Roughly $5,000 was spent on it. The video got local airplay in Orange County. It was also aired on MTV, but it was never aired on VH1, although it was played on MuchMusic in Canada. It failed to achieve status on any chart. In 2003 the song was released on No Doubt's greatest hits compilation album The Singles 1992-2003 and the video was released on the companion DVD of music videos, The Videos 1992–2003.

Directed by Mike Zykoff, Trapped in a Box is the only No Doubt music video to feature original keyboardist Eric Stefani before his departure in 1994.

== Track listing ==
CD single

1. "Trapped in a Box" – 3:24
