= Buccaneer (musician) =

- Born: Andrew Patrick Bradford; 1972 (age 53–54)
- Origin: Jamaica
- Genres: Ragga
- Occupations: Deejay, record producer
- Years active: 1994–present
- Labels: VP, Greensleeves, Opera House

Andrew Patrick Bradford (born 1974), known by the stage name Buccaneer is a Jamaican dancehall musician. He first emerged in 1994 and has released three albums. He later went into production.

== Biography ==
Buccaneer first came to public attention in 1994 when he had a big hit in Jamaica with "Hey Yah Hey Yah". He stood out from the crowd with his eye patch and pirate garb, and ring bleached into his hair, and had further early successes for producers Patrick Roberts and King Jammy, including collaborations with Wayne Wonder with "Sensi Ride" and "Trust" . His debut album, Now There Goes The Neighbourhood, was issued in 1995, with production from Roberts, Bobby Digital, Dave Kelly, and Danny Browne, and the same year he made a huge impact at the Reggae Sumfest festival. Several of his hits were based on opera music, including his 1995 hit "Skettel Concerto", based on The Marriage of Figaro. Second album Classic continued the theme with tracks based on Moonlight Sonata and Blue Danube Waltz, and third album Da Opera (1998) used Enya's "Orinoco Flow" as the basis for his hit "Fade Away". Other hits in 1998 included "Bruk Out", a collaboration with US punk rock band Rancid. Further hits followed in 1999 with "Hot Bwoy" (with Beenie Man), "Kill a Sound", "Little John Hits Medley", and in 2000 with "Hot to Ratid", and the Lexxus-produced "Freedom of Speech".

Buccaneer moved into production, and set up his own Opera House label. He was the first to record Mavado. He has also produced recordings by Vybz Kartel, Sean Paul, and Tami Chynn.

A collection of older material, The Darkside, was released in 2014, featuring guest performances from 112, Damian Marley, Spragga Benz, and Lady Saw.

== Discography ==
- Now There Goes The Neighbourhood (1994) VP
- Classic (1997) Greensleeves
- Da Opera (1998) VP
- The Darkside (2014), Opera House
- "Second Place" 1996
