= Wayne Jobson =

Jamaican record producer

Wayne Jobson (born December 4, 1954), also known as Native Wayne, is a Jamaican record producer. He is best known for his work with artists No Doubt, Gregory Isaacs and Toots & the Maytals. He hosts the weekly radio show "Alter Native" Sunday afternoons on Indie 103.1. He previously hosted a similar radio show, "Reggae Revolution", at Indie's main competitor KROQ-FM. Jobson is also a musician, having recorded an album in 1977 produced by Lee 'Scratch' Perry at the Black Ark.

Born on Dec 4, 1954 in Jamaica, Wayne Jobson also known as "Native Wayne", is a Jamaican record producer and produces films, is a radio personality, host a syndicated radio show and a music historian. He grew up in the hills of St. Ann, just nine miles from ‘Nine Mile’ the birthplace of Bob Marley, Wayne started off with close ties to both reggae and the Marley family. Dickie Jobson, a cousin started Island Records along with Chris Blackwell and managed Bob Marley and the Wailers, while another cousin, Diane Jobson was Marley's attorney.

After graduating high school in Jamaica, Jobson studied law at Kings College in London and received a Master of Laws in Entertainment Law. As both writer and producer of the documentary film “STEPPING RAZOR-RED X”, which follows the life story of Reggae legend, Peter Tosh, Wayne was awarded with a nomination for a Canadian Academy Award, a ‘Genie’, and won for “Best Documentary” at the Jamaican Film Festival in Jamaica.

In the punk rock and post punk period in London, Jobson contributed some Discomixes to Jah Wobble's debut album, which featured a largely "guitar-free" sound, infused in reggae and punk-inspired dub." According to Trouser Press, Wobble "accentuates his reggae pretensions, fiddles with electronics and overdubbing and plays shadowy, threatening bass."

Wayne Jobson also provided Jah Wobble with a Black Ark Discomix, which Wobble retitled "Dreadlock Don't Deal in Wedlock", with Jah Wobble toasting over backing tracks provided to him by Wayne Jobson. The backing track Jobson provided was originally titled "Black Tracks," originally recorded by Lee Perry, September 1977 at Channel One Studios.

In addition, he produced two “Behind the Music” episodes for Viacom's VH1. “Behind the Music” is considered the most successful music television show in recent history. Jobson produced both an episode on Peter Tosh and also on the life of Bob Marley which made history by being the first show to air for 90 minutes versus the standard one hour.

No stranger to successful films and television shows produced in Jamaica, Wayne assisted with the production of the Alec Baldwin/Meg Ryan Film “PRELUDE TO A KISS’ and helped put together the music for the most successful Jamaican film of all time, Disney's “COOL RUNNINGS” which was made for $14 million and grossed over $200 million, with its soundtrack going gold. He was also a part of putting together the ABC TV series “GOING TO EXTREMES” with “NORTHERN EXPOSURE” producers Falsey and Brand.

Wayne helped Adam Sandler put together the reggae soundtrack for his ’50 First Dates’ movie which went gold and was #1 on Billboard soundtrack charts.

As a Producer on NO DOUBT's multiplatinum album ‘ROCK STEADY’, Wayne/s singles ‘HEY BABY’ and ‘UNDERNEATH IT ALL’ both went to #1 in America and won him two Grammys, with the album reaching 25 million sold worldwide.

He has also produced two compilations for Polygram which spent 6 months at #1 on Billboard's reggae chart and sold over a half of a million copies.

A renowned artist himself, “Native Wayne” was spotted by Clive Davis’ Arista Records and was the first Reggae artist to be signed to the label. With his band, “NATIVE”, he recorded albums for Arista, RCA, Buddah, A&M and MCA Records. “NATIVE” opened shows for both reggae greats, Bob Marley and Peter Tosh. NATIVE performed at its biggest show ever at the US Festival in California with David Bowie where the audience was over 300,000 people. He produced the critically acclaimed compilation “REGGAE BLITZ ALL STARS” which featured such artists as Maxi Priest, Toots and the Maytals, Third World, Black Uhuru, Big Mountain, Shabba Ranks and the Gregory Isaacs.

Jobson has recorded with and produced a wide range of artists including: Keith Richards of “THE ROLLING STONES”, Jimmy Cliff, Toots and the Maytals, Willie Nelson (playing guitar and putting together the ‘Countryman’ reggae album), Gregory Isaacs, 311, Thievery Corporation, Paris Hilton, Herb Alpert and Garth Brooks.

As a songwriter he has had his songs covered by such artists as Willie Nelson, Leon Robinson, Richie Stevens and Junior Reid. Jobson co-wrote with Jimmy Buffett, one of the songs on the Jimmy Buffett album “FAR SIDE OF THE WORLD” which entered the Billboard album charts at #5.

Diving into the world of radio, Wayne was both producer and DJ at the #1 modern rock station in the world, KROQ 106.7 FM in Los Angeles, on which he had the #1 reggae show in America, “REGGAE REVOLUTION” running for a seven-year period.

A longtime grammy member, Wayne has also worked as consultant to the Grammy Foundation, hosted P&E Wing events, and continues to be involved in Reggae Grammy nominations and submissions.

Jobson also produced a live album and DVD for Jamaican guitar legend Ernie Ranglin featuring Robbie Krieger (from the Doors), Elliot Easton (from the Cars) and No Doubt. This resulted in a film on the history of reggae music and Ernie Ranglin called ‘Roots of Reggae’ which was voted as one of the top films at the Flashpoint Film Festival in 2007 – Photo: Arthur Gorson “Native” Wayne was Program Director at XM Satellite Radio in Washington DC, the first nationwide, 24 hour, 7 day a week station in America. As program director and DJ for “The Joint”, Jobson helped to bring reggae to a national audience. When they launched the largest ($2 billion) radio operation on the planet in 2001, Wayne arranged for Bob Marley's ‘One Love’ to be the first song ever to be broadcast.

Jobson worked as consultant and DJ with Jimmy Buffett on his Radio Margaritaville, which can be heard on Sirius Satellite Radio.

Jobson also worked as a consultant to Napster to develop their Reggae and World Music Department.

Currently, Jobson is a producer and DJ at modern rock powerhouse Indie 103.1 Radio in Los Angeles which Rolling Stone describes as ‘the best station in America’

As producer and remixer, Wayne's recent project include Gavin Rossdale (Bush), Salvador Santana (Carlos's son), OAR (Atlantic Records), Long Beach Dub Allstars (Sublime), Brand New Heavies, The Doors, Jason Mraz, Maroon 5, No Doubt, Garbage, Shaggy and Magic.

Jobson is developing a feature film on the life of reggae legend Peter Tosh with Academy Award-winning director Kevin MacDonald.

He is currently working with Academy Award-winning director Daniel Junge on the Alpha documentary about the famous music school in Jamaica.

The recordings were released in a CD format in 2007.

Jobson won two grammies with No Doubt as executive producer for the songs "Hey Baby" and "Underneath it All" from the Rock Steady Album. On the same album Wayne Jobson also was executive producer for "Underneath it All" which was a nominee for a Grammy. Wayne Jobson also has made the following documentaries. 1992 Stepping Razor: Red X (Documentary) (co-executive producer) 2006 Roots of Reggae: The Ernest Ranglin Story (Video documentary short) (producer)
