= Return of Saturn =

2000 studio album by No Doubt

Studio album by No Doubt
- Released: April 11, 2000
- Recorded: 1998–1999
- Studios: Royaltone, North Hollywood; NRG, North Hollywood; Aerowave, Encino, California; Ocean Way, Hollywood; Hang Suite, Hollywood; A&M, Hollywood
- Genres: Alternative rock; new wave
- Length: 60:44
- Labels: Trauma; Interscope
- Producers: Glen Ballard; Jerry Harrison; No Doubt; Matthew Wilder

No Doubt chronology
Tragic Kingdom (1995)	Return of Saturn (2000)	Rock Steady (2001)

Singles from Return of Saturn
- 1. "New" Released: May 31, 1999; 2. "Ex-Girlfriend" Released: March 13, 2000; 3. "Simple Kind of Life" Released: June 13, 2000; 4. "Bathwater" Released: November 14, 2000

Return of Saturn is the fourth studio album by American rock band No Doubt, released on April 11, 2000, by Trauma Records and Interscope Records. It marked the band's first album as a quartet, following the departure of original keyboardist Eric Stefani in 1994. After touring for two and a half years to promote their breakthrough third studio album, Tragic Kingdom (1995), No Doubt wrote several dozen songs for its follow-up and eventually settled on working with producer Glen Ballard. Creating the album became a tumultuous process lasting two years, during which there was dissension among band members and between the band and its label. The album was completed after the band returned to the studio and recorded what became two of its singles.

The album maintains the ska punk and reggae influences of the band's previous work, but with slower, more ballad-like songs. The lyrics to many of the songs describe singer Gwen Stefani's pining for a more domestic life, contrasting that with her commitment to a music career.

Upon its release, Return of Saturn received favorable reviews from music critics, although several of them were divided over its different sound to its predecessor. It debuted at number two on the Billboard 200 but was unable to measure up to the sales of Tragic Kingdom. The album spawned four singles, only one of which charted on the Billboard Hot 100, It was nominated for Best Rock Album at the 43rd Grammy Awards.

== Background ==
After the success of No Doubt's breakthrough album Tragic Kingdom (1995), the band wrote more than 20 songs for a new album, influenced by artists such as the Cure. Having toured extensively for two and a half years since the release of Tragic Kingdom, they initially had trouble producing material and decided to experiment with new sounds. Many of the songs were written in a rented house in Hollywood Hills, Los Angeles, where bassist Tony Kanal was living. During early production in mid-1998 the band worked on seven tracks in Los Angeles with Matthew Wilder, who had produced Tragic Kingdom, but had creative differences with him. They planned on going to New York City to work with producer Michael Beinhorn, who had produced for alternative rock acts such as Red Hot Chili Peppers, Hole, and Soundgarden.

When scheduling conflicts arose with Beinhorn, the band interviewed several producers and decided on Glen Ballard, who had produced Alanis Morissette's Jagged Little Pill (1995), because of pressure from manager Jimmy Iovine and Ballard's belief in not using heavy production techniques. Ballard went through the band's 40 demos and ruled out half of them. They frequently missed due dates, arguing that hurrying the album to cash in on the success of Tragic Kingdom was unwise since three years had passed. In early 1999, No Doubt released "New", co-produced by Talking Heads member Jerry Harrison, for the soundtrack to the 1999 film Go.

By that July, the band stopped work on the album, intending to be done with the record. Interscope, however, recommended that they continue writing so they would have a more marketable single. The band was split when singer Gwen Stefani offered to do so but drummer Adrian Young and guitarist Tom Dumont did not want to, hesitant to trust Interscope after it had sublicensed Tragic Kingdom to Trauma Records. After a brief break, Dumont sent Stefani some of his demos as a peace offering. The band returned to the studio to create more upbeat songs and penned "Ex-Girlfriend" and "Simple Kind of Life". More recording, audio mixing and audio mastering were done late that year, and David LaChapelle photographed the band for the album cover in January 2000.

The album's working title was originally announced as Magic's in the Makeup in May 1998 and later as Saturn Returns in November 1999. Stefani was confused by her feelings of depression and interest in Sylvia Plath while recording the album. Her boyfriend Gavin Rossdale told her that she was going through her Saturn return. Saturn's orbit takes 29.4 Earth years and, in astrology, the time when Saturn returns to its position during a person's birth is believed to be a period of self-evaluation. Stefani was born October 3, 1969, and many of the songs were written during her Saturn return.

== Music and lyrics ==
"Ex-Girlfriend" (2000)
The first single, featuring New Wave influences, rapped vocals, flamenco guitar, and use of the piano.

"Simple Kind of Life" (2000)
The album's second single, a lo-fi ballad in which Stefani discusses wanting to settle down.

The music of Return of Saturn further explores new wave style, while adding an alternative rock feel and maintaining some of the band's ska and reggae sounds. Adrian Young's drum part on "Simple Kind of Life" was mixed through low fidelity filters to give it the sound of a lo-fi power ballad. "Six Feet Under" and "Staring Problem" were described as a more self-aware return to the band's earlier material, a combination of work by new wave band Missing Persons and hard rock band Van Halen.

No Doubt experiments with several new styles on the album. "Ex-Girlfriend", which originally featured a Prince-style funk sound, was rewritten and includes rapped vocals over piano and flamenco guitar parts. After opening with Gabrial McNair's jazz funeral horn part over Young's beatboxing, "Bathwater" proceeds into a song written in swing time. It was described as a combination of the band's 2 Tone roots with the operatic slapstick of Gilbert and Sullivan. "Marry Me" features use of the tabla, a pair of tuned hand drums prominent in India. Young and bassist Tony Kanal's contributions were compared to the rhythm of nu metal music, and the fragmented progression of "Comforting Lie" was likened to the work of Korn.

The album's lyrics depict Stefani's maturation and femininity, reflected by images of oral contraceptives, a wedding cake and makeup on the album cover, as well as her romantic relationship with Rossdale. Her lyrics drew comparisons to the bitter, confessional styling of Hole frontwoman Courtney Love. "New" was written while the band was touring about the excitement of meeting Rossdale and her infatuation with him. Later compositions, however, discuss the problems that the two had maintaining a long-distance relationship. "Ex-Girlfriend" discusses a failing relationship, and "Suspension Without Suspense" and "Home Now" detail feelings of resentment, loneliness, and indecision. On "Simple Kind of Life", she confesses to hoping for a mistake with her birth control and a desire to leaving music for a domestic life. She contrasts this, however, with her need for independence:

Anyone who knows me knows having a family has always been the most important thing to me. I wanted to be a mother—which is an unconditional giving of love—and a supportive wife, and suddenly, I can't even be a good girlfriend, because I can't seem to find the right time to call. I want to do it all, but I can only do one thing good, and right now I've chosen to do this. Being in a band is a bit of a selfish choice.

— Gwen Stefani, Entertainment Weekly

== Critical reception ==
Professional ratings
Aggregate scores
Source	Rating
Metacritic	68/100
Review scores
Source	Rating
AllMusic	4.5/5 stars
Entertainment Weekly	B
The Guardian	3/5 stars
Los Angeles Times	3/4 stars
Melody Maker	4/5 stars
NME	5/10
Q	3/5 stars
Rolling Stone	4/5 stars
Slant Magazine	3.5/5 stars
The Village Voice	C+

Return of Saturn received generally positive reviews from music critics. At Metacritic, which assigns a normalized rating out of 100 to reviews from mainstream publications, the album received an average score of 68, based on 16 reviews. Entertainment Weekly's David Browne characterized the album as filled with "smoother, layered mid-tempo ballads as creamily textured as extra-thick napoleon pastries", but stated that Stefani's lyrics were too much of a throwback to the alternative rock scene of the early 1990s and contrasted with the boom of teen pop. Robert Christgau, writing for The Village Voice, described the emotions Stefani expressed as shallow, and Siobhan Grogan of NME stated that Stefani's preoccupation with Rossdale was distracting and weakened the intense, Madonna-like character she had established on Tragic Kingdom. AllMusic critic Stephen Thomas Erlewine, however, called it "a terrific, layered record that exceeds any expectations set by Tragic Kingdom". Barry Walters from Rolling Stone referred to it as "a superstar follow-up that not only betters its predecessor but also radically departs from it." The publication included the album in its list of the top 50 albums of the year, describing it as "a record that charges ahead like gangbusters while biting its nails." Sal Cinquemani from Slant Magazine commented that although the album did not have any successful singles, Return of Saturn was "a solid album and proof of a healthy, genre-breaking future for No Doubt."

== Commercial performance ==
Return of Saturn debuted at number two on the US Billboard 200, behind 'N Sync's No Strings Attached, and sold 202,000 copies in its first week. The Recording Industry Association of America (RIAA) certified the album platinum in May 2000, and as of July 2012, it had sold 1,587,000 copies in the United States. The album was successful in the modern rock market and its first two singles, "New" and "Ex-Girlfriend", reached the top 10 of the Billboard Modern Rock Tracks chart. It was less successful in the mainstream market, and "Simple Kind of Life" was the only single to chart on the Billboard Hot 100, where it peaked at number 38. The album was nominated for Best Rock Album at the 2001 Grammy Awards, but lost out to Foo Fighters' There Is Nothing Left to Lose. In Canada, it peaked at number two on RPM's albums chart and number four on Billboard's albums chart. Return of Saturn was awarded a Platinum certification by the Canadian Recording Industry Association (CRIA) in June 2000, denoting sales in excess of 100,000 copies.

== Track listing ==
All tracks produced by Glen Ballard, except "New" produced by Jerry Harrison and No Doubt, "Too Late (Instrumental)" produced by Ballard and Matthew Wilder, and "Big Distraction" produced by Wilder.

No.	Title	Writer(s)	Length
1.	"Ex-Girlfriend"	Gwen Stefani; Tom Dumont; Tony Kanal	3:31
2.	"Simple Kind of Life"	G. Stefani	4:16
3.	"Bathwater"	G. Stefani; Kanal; Dumont	4:03
4.	"Six Feet Under"	G. Stefani; Kanal	2:28
5.	"Magic's in the Makeup"	G. Stefani; Dumont	4:21
6.	"Artificial Sweetener"	G. Stefani; Dumont; Kanal	3:54
7.	"Marry Me"	G. Stefani; Kanal	4:39
8.	"New"	G. Stefani; Dumont	4:26
9.	"Too Late"	G. Stefani; Dumont; Kanal	4:14
10.	"Comforting Lie"	G. Stefani; Dumont; Kanal	2:53
11.	"Suspension Without Suspense"	G. Stefani	4:10
12.	"Staring Problem"	G. Stefani; Kanal; Eric Stefani	2:44
13.	"Home Now"	G. Stefani; Dumont; Kanal	4:35
14.	"Dark Blue" "Too Late (Instrumental)" (hidden track)	G. Stefani; Dumont	10:30
Total length:			60:44

International edition bonus track
No.	Title	Writer(s)	Length
15.	"Big Distraction" "Too Late (Instrumental)" (hidden track)	G. Stefani; Dumont	9:30
Total length:			64:26

Japanese edition bonus tracks
No.	Title	Writer(s)	Length
15.	"Big Distraction"	G. Stefani; Dumont	3:34
16.	"Full Circle" "Too Late (Instrumental)" (hidden track)	G. Stefani; Kanal; Dumont	9:12
Total length:			65:35

=== Notes ===
- "Too Late (Instrumental)" is 4:56 and appears after one minute of silence as a hidden track after the end of the last credited song.
- "Dark Blue" is 4:36 on the international and Japanese editions.

== Personnel ==
Credits adapted from the liner notes of Return of Saturn.

=== No Doubt ===
- Gwen Stefani – vocals
- Tony Kanal – bass guitar
- Tom Dumont – guitars
- Adrian Young – drums, percussion

=== Additional musicians ===
- Gabrial McNair – synthesizer, piano, all keyboard instruments, trombone, horn arrangements (all tracks); synthesizer programming (track 5)
- Stephen Bradley – trumpet
- Bryan Carrigan – synthesizer programming (track 5)
- Michael Boddicker – synthesizer programming (track 5)
- Theo "Hound Dog" Mondle – tablas (track 7)
- Orion Crawford – chart preparation
- Mike Garson – piano ("Too Late (Instrumental)")
- Paul Buckmaster – string arrangements ("Too Late (Instrumental)")

=== Technical ===
- Glen Ballard – production (tracks 1–7, 9–14, "Too Late (Instrumental)")
- Jerry Harrison – production (track 8)
- No Doubt – production (track 8)
- Alain Johannes – recording (tracks 2–7, 9–14, "Too Late (Instrumental)")
- Karl Derfler – recording (tracks 1, 5, 8)
- Jack Joseph Puig – mixing
- Bob Ludwig – mastering
- Scott Campbell – additional recording
- Bryan Carrigan – additional recording
- Sean Beavan – additional recording (tracks 6, 7, 14); sonic manipulation (tracks 1, 5, 8)
- Colin "Dog" Mitchell – pre-production recording, equipment coordination
- Jolie Levine-Aller – production coordination
- Rachel Cleverley – production assistance
- Matthew Wilder – production ("Too Late (Instrumental)")
- Thom Panunzio – recording ("Too Late (Instrumental)")

=== Artwork ===
- David LaChapelle – photography
- Robert Fisher – design
- Joe Mama-Nitzberg – photography, art coordination
- Cindy Cooper – album package coordination

== Charts ==
=== Weekly charts ===
Weekly chart performance for Return of Saturn
Chart (2000)	Peak position
Australian Albums (ARIA)	11
Austrian Albums (Ö3 Austria)	18
Belgian Albums (Ultratop Flanders)	44
Belgian Albums (Ultratop Wallonia)	45
Canada Top Albums/CDs (RPM)	2
Canadian Albums (Billboard)	4
Dutch Albums (Album Top 100)	24
European Albums (Music & Media)	7
Finnish Albums (Suomen virallinen lista)	5
French Albums (SNEP)	21
German Albums (Offizielle Top 100)	5
Irish Albums (IRMA)	52
Japanese Albums (Oricon)	18
New Zealand Albums (RMNZ)	14
Norwegian Albums (VG-lista)	35
Portuguese Albums (AFP)	13
Scottish Albums (Official Charts)	36
Swedish Albums (Sverigetopplistan)	7
Swiss Albums (Schweizer Hitparade)	8
UK Albums (Official Charts)	31
US Billboard 200	2

=== Year-end charts ===
Year-end chart performance for Return of Saturn
Chart (2000)	Position
Canadian Albums (Nielsen SoundScan)	133
US Billboard 200	73

== Certifications ==
Certifications for Return of Saturn
Region	Certification	Certified units/sales
Australia (ARIA)	Gold	35,000^{^}
Canada (Music Canada)	Platinum	100,000^{^}
United States (RIAA)	Platinum	1,587,000
^{^} Shipments figures based on certification alone.
