= Ex-Girlfriend (song) =

2000 single by No Doubt

Single by No Doubt

from the album Return of Saturn
- B-side: "Leftovers"; "Big Distraction"; "Full Circle"
- Released: March 13, 2000
- Studio: Various (Los Angeles)
- Genre: Pop-punk; new wave
- Length: 3:31
- Label: Interscope; Trauma
- Songwriters: Gwen Stefani; Tom Dumont; Tony Kanal
- Producer: Glen Ballard

No Doubt singles chronology
"New" (1999)	"Ex-Girlfriend" (2000)	"Simple Kind of Life" (2000)

Audio sample
- file; help

Music video
- "Ex-Girlfriend" on YouTube

"Ex-Girlfriend" is a song by American rock band No Doubt from their fourth studio album, Return of Saturn (2000). The song was released as the album's second overall single in early 2000 and was moderately successful, reaching the top 40 in most countries it charted in, including peaking within the top 10 in Australia, Iceland, and Spain. In the United States, it reached number two on the Billboard Modern Rock Tracks chart. A review from Billboard called Stefani's vocal performance on the song "fantastic".

== Background and writing ==
Lead singer Gwen Stefani originally composed the song as a dirge about her relationship with Gavin Rossdale, the lead singer of British rock band Bush, whom she married in 2002. After listening to it, the band increased the tempo because the album already included several ballads. The line "you say you're gonna burn before you mellow" is a reference to the lyrics in the Bush song "Dead Meat": "I'm doing you in tomorrow/I'll burn before I mellow".

"Ex-Girlfriend" is a pop-punk and new wave song, composed in the key of E minor. Written in common time, it moves at a fast tempo of 168 beats per minute. Stefani's vocal range in the song covers nearly an octave and a half, from G_{3} to C_{5}. The song features Stefani rapping many of the lyrics rather than singing, and the instrumentals take influence from flamenco (as demonstrated by its guitar riffs) and hip-hop.

== Chart performance ==
"Ex-Girlfriend" failed to enter the US Billboard Hot 100 chart but reached number 11 on the Bubbling Under Hot 100. It did manage to find popularity on US alternative rock stations, allowing it to peak at number two on the Modern Rock Tracks chart, becoming No Doubt's highest-charting single on that listing alongside their breakthrough hit single, "Don't Speak". Abroad, the single experienced more success, reaching number six in Iceland and number nine in Australia and Spain, as well as the top 20 in Finland, the Netherlands, New Zealand, Sweden, and Switzerland. In Australia, the song was certified Gold and came in at number 80 on the country's year-end chart for 2000. In the United Kingdom, the song became No Doubt's fifth top-40 hit, debuting and peaking at number 23 on the UK Singles Chart and spending three weeks in the top 100. In Ireland, the song reached number 40 and spent two weeks in the top 50.

== Music video ==
Stefani and Kanal falling in the music video.

The song's music video, which the video itself indicated was "presented" by Hype Williams, was partially based on the controversial anime Kite. It was filmed in Los Angeles on January 24–26, 2000. In the video, Stefani cross-dresses to enter a men's bathroom and, upon being discovered, assaults Tony Kanal (who plays her ex-boyfriend) and several other men. When Kanal regains consciousness, he grabs Stefani and jumps out the window, and the two plummet to the ground. The storyline is cut with scenes of the band playing on a stage. No Doubt's guitarist Tom Dumont initially played the part of a police officer but was cut from the final version of the "Ex-Girlfriend" video. He enacts the role in MTV's Making the Video.

== Track listings ==
UK CD single

1. "Ex-Girlfriend" – 3:30
2. "Leftovers" – 4:31
3. "Ex-Girlfriend" (CD-ROM video)

UK cassette single

A. "Ex-Girlfriend" – 3:30
B. "Leftovers" – 4:31

International CD single

1. "Ex-Girlfriend" – 3:31
2. "Leftovers" – 4:31
3. "Full Circle" – 3:16
4. "Ex-Girlfriend" (video)

== Credits and personnel ==
Credits are lifted from the UK CD single liner notes and the Return of Saturn album booklet.

Studios

- Recorded at various studios in Los Angeles
- Mixed at Ocean Way Recording (Hollywood, California, US)
- Mastered at Gateway Mastering (Portland, Maine, US)

No Doubt

- Gwen Stefani – writing, vocals
- Tony Kanal – writing, bass guitar
- Tom Dumont – writing, guitars
- Adrian Young – drums, percussion

Other musicians

- Gabrial McNair – synthesizer, piano, all keyboard instruments, trombone, horn arrangements
- Stephen Bradley – B♭ trumpet, E♭ trumpet

Other personnel

- Glen Ballard – production
- Karl Derfler – recording
- Scott Campbell, Bryan Carrigan – additional recording
- Jack Joseph Puig – mixing
- Bob Ludwig – mastering
- Sean Beavan – sonic manipulation
- David LaChapelle – photography
- Robert Fisher, Flying Fish Studio – design

== Charts ==
=== Weekly charts ===
Chart (2000)	Peak position
Australia (ARIA)	9
Belgium (Ultratip Bubbling Under Flanders)	15
Europe (Eurochart Hot 100)	36
Finland (Suomen virallinen lista)	15
Germany (GfK)	34
Iceland (Íslenski Listinn Topp 40)	6
Ireland (IRMA)	40
Italy (FIMI)	21
Netherlands (Dutch Top 40)	15
Netherlands (Single Top 100)	35
New Zealand (Recorded Music NZ)	11
Scottish Singles Sales (Official Charts)	26
Spain (Promusicae)	9
Sweden (Sverigetopplistan)	18
Switzerland (Schweizer Hitparade)	19
UK Singles (Official Charts)	23
US Bubbling Under Hot 100 (Billboard)	11
US Alternative Airplay (Billboard)	2

=== Year-end charts ===
Chart (2000)	Position
Australia (ARIA)	80
Iceland (Íslenski Listinn Topp 40)	43
US Modern Rock Tracks (Billboard)	35

== Certifications ==
Region	Certification	Certified units/sales
Australia (ARIA)	Gold	35,000^{^}
^{^} Shipments figures based on certification alone.

== Release history ==
Region	Date	Format(s)	Label(s)	Ref.
United Kingdom	March 13, 2000	CD; cassette	Interscope; Trauma	
Japan	March 29, 2000	CD	Interscope	
