= Simple Kind of Life =

2000 single by No Doubt

Single by No Doubt

from the album Return of Saturn
- B-side: "Full Circle"; "Beauty Contest"; "Cellophane Boy"; "Under Construction"
- Released: June 13, 2000
- Studio: Royaltone (North Hollywood, California)
- Genre: Power pop; lo-fi
- Length: 4:16
- Label: Interscope; Trauma
- Songwriter: Gwen Stefani
- Producer: Glen Ballard

No Doubt singles chronology
"Ex-Girlfriend" (2000)	"Simple Kind of Life" (2000)	"Bathwater" (2000)

Music video
- "Simple Kind of Life" on YouTube

"Simple Kind of Life" is a song written by Gwen Stefani for American rock band No Doubt's fourth album, Return of Saturn (2000). The song contrasts Stefani's desire to settle down and start a family with her commitment to the band. It received positive reviews from music critics, who noted the song's somber melody and raw lyrics.

"Simple Kind of Life" was released as the album's second single in June 2000. It became the most successful American single from Return of Saturn, but had little international success. The accompanying music video illustrates the song's themes of marriage and family.

== Background and writing ==
Singer Gwen Stefani wrote and composed the track during a last minute recording session. Stefani had been writing with bassist Tony Kanal that day, and she wrote the song late at night during what she referred to as "a PMS moment". Following "Suspension Without Suspense", "Simple Kind of Life" became the second song that Stefani wrote by herself. The song was recorded with no rehearsals the following Monday. Adrian Young's drum parts were mixed through low fidelity filters to get the feel of a lo-fi power ballad.

The lyrics of "Simple Kind of Life" also discuss Stefani's relationship with Gavin Rossdale. She describes wanting to settle down, get married, and have children. In the final verse, she even dreams about how her life would be if there were a mistake in her birth control and she became pregnant. However, she contrasts this with her commitment to music and No Doubt. Stefani describes her relationship as unhealthy because of this disparity, comparing herself to "a sick domestic abuser looking for a fight." She ultimately decides that settling down is just a fantasy for her since her freedom and independence is more important for her.

== Music and structure ==
"Simple Kind of Life"
The song transitions into a more complex harmony in the chorus.

"Simple Kind of Life" is a power pop and lo-fi song composed in the key of C major. It is written in common time and moves at a moderate tempo of 116 beats per minute. Stefani's vocal range in the song covers nearly an octave and a half, from G_{3} to C_{5}.

The song opens with a four-measure introduction, which introduces the Dm9-Cmaj7 modal chord progression used for the song's three verses. Following each verse is the chorus, where the harmony switches to a Cmaj7-C7-F-B♭ progression. A bridge entirely in D minor precedes the third verse. After the third chorus comes a coda, which closes the song as Stefani repeats the phrase "a simple kind of life" ad libitum while the song fades, as the song confirms its dreamy major tonality in a series of Cmaj7 and Fmaj7 chords.

== Critical reception ==
"Simple Kind of Life" received positive reviews from music critics. Rolling Stone described the song as being "at once grand, fragile and very, very sad" and commented that "it's clear this woman whom many desire but few regard as a serious artist has penned a song that can sit on the same shelf with the likes of Elliott Smith and Aimee Mann." Entertainment Weekly characterized the song as "manicured power pop" with a melody "buttery to the point of melting". It later included the song in a list of No Doubt's top five songs, referring to it as "musically understated (layered guitar strumming and a melancholy melody), but lyrically devastating." Slant Magazine found the song's melodic structure odd, but was pleased by how it "unabashedly delivers double-takes". "Simple Kind of Life" was listed at number 28 on the 2000 Pazz & Jop list, a survey of several hundred music critics conducted by Robert Christgau.

== Chart performance ==
In the United States, "Simple Kind of Life" was the most commercially successful single from Return of Saturn. Peaking at number 38, it became the album's only single to enter the Billboard Hot 100. The song fared somewhat better in mainstream music, reaching number 32 on the Top 40 Mainstream and number 35 on the Top 40 Tracks. It had the most success with modern rock and adult contemporary stations, peaking at number 14 on the Modern Rock Tracks and number 18 on the Adult Top 40. The single was a commercial failure outside of the U.S. It debuted at the bottom of the Dutch Mega Single Top 100 in mid-June 2000. It climbed up two positions the next week but exited the chart after its third week.

== Music video ==
Gwen Stefani in a wedding dress from the music video.

The song's music video was directed by Sophie Muller. It opens with a scene of Stefani and Kanal holding each other. During the chorus, she runs to a church while wearing a wedding dress designed after a fashion show by John Galliano, while her bandmates run after her. During the next verse, Stefani and guitarist Tom Dumont sit on a couch, and Stefani gets up on the table while Dumont plays an acoustic guitar. Stefani has a nightmare during the second chorus, in which she is in an endless hall full of wedding cakes, attempting to stop her bandmates from destroying them. There is then a dream sequence in which Stefani is backlit in front of a circle of stars. She sits with Young for the third verse, during which point in time a light in the shape of a birth control pill dispenser flashes, with one missing pill. This coincides with her line "Sometime I wished/For a mistake," referencing her desire to get pregnant. In the video, Young quickly stands up and leaves as Stefani sings the line "You seem like you'd be a good dad" to play with Dumont and Kanal. The band walks through a cemetery, and Stefani finds a baby. Her bandmates extend their arms to hold the baby, but Stefani hands the baby off to a woman and enters her trailer to remove her makeup.

Muller was staying with Stefani when the song was written, so Stefani stated that "it was obvious that she would be the one to do the video" when Stefani played Muller the song after writing it. Muller designed the video around the song's lyrics because she felt that "there are very few [songs] that reveal as much in their lyrics". She set the band members up with props and filmed after giving loose suggestions. Muller originally intended for the dream sequence to show Stefani over a sea of orange juice but changed the scene based on Stefani's performance.

The music video was unsuccessful on video chart programs. It debuted at number seven on MTV's Total Request Live on April 24, 2000. The video made two more appearances later that week but was unable to reach a higher position and dropped out of the countdown. It was unable to chart on MuchMusic's Countdown.

== Track listings ==
US CD and cassette single

1. "Simple Kind of Life" (G. Stefani) - 4:16
2. "Full Circle" (G. Stefani/T. Kanal/T. Dumont) - 3:16
3. "Beauty Contest" (G. Stefani/T. Kanal) - 4:14

US CD single

1. "Simple Kind of Life" (G. Stefani) - 4:16

US vinyl single

1. "Simple Kind of Life" (G. Stefani) - 4:16
2. "Ex-Girlfriend" (G. Stefani/T. Dumont/T. Kanal) - 3:30

German, Dutch, and Australian CD single

1. "Simple Kind of Life" (G. Stefani) - 4:16
2. "Beauty Contest" (G. Stefani/T. Kanal) - 4:14
3. "Simple Kind of Life" - acoustic live (G. Stefani) - 4:14
4. "Simple Kind of Life" video

Dutch, Australian, and Japanese 2-track

1. "Simple Kind of Life" (G. Stefani) - 4:16
2. "Beauty Contest" (G. Stefani/T. Kanal) - 4:14

Dutch version 2

1. "Simple Kind of Life" (G. Stefani) - 4:16
2. "Simple Kind of Life" video

UK CD 1

1. "Simple Kind of Life" (G. Stefani) - 4:16
2. "Ex-Girlfriend" - acoustic live (G. Stefani/T. Dumont/T. Kanal) - 3:50
3. "Cellophane Boy" (G. Stefani, T. Dumont, T. Kanal) - 2:53

UK CD 2

1. "Simple Kind of Life" (G. Stefani) - 4:16
2. "Beauty Contest" (G. Stefani/T. Kanal) - 4:14
3. "Under Construction" (G. Stefani/T. Kanal) - 3:12
4. "Simple Kind of Life" video

== Charts ==
=== Weekly charts ===
Weekly chart performance for "Simple Kind of Life"
Chart (2000)	Peak position
Australia (ARIA)	94
Canada Top Singles (RPM)	52
Canada Rock/Alternative (RPM)	27
Netherlands (Dutch Top 40 Tipparade)	11
Netherlands (Single Top 100)	98
Scottish Singles Sales (Official Charts)	70
UK Singles (Official Charts)	69
US Billboard Hot 100	38
US Adult Pop Airplay (Billboard)	18
US Alternative Airplay (Billboard)	14
US Pop Airplay (Billboard)	32

=== Year-end charts ===
Year-end chart performance for "Simple Kind of Life"
Chart (2000)	Position
US Adult Top 40 (Billboard)	52
US Modern Rock Tracks (Billboard)	60

== Release history ==
Release dates and formats for "Simple Kind of Life"
Region	Date	Format(s)	Label(s)	Ref.
United States	May 22, 2000	Hot adult contemporary radio	Interscope; Trauma	
United States	May 23, 2000	Contemporary hit radio	Interscope; Trauma	
United States	June 13, 2000	7-inch vinyl; CD; cassette	Interscope; Trauma	
Japan	July 19, 2000	CD	Interscope	
