= New (No Doubt song) =

1999 single by No Doubt

Single by No Doubt

from the album Music from the Motion Picture Go and Return of Saturn
- Released: May 31, 1999
- Recorded: January 1999
- Studio: NORG (North Hollywood, California)
- Genre: Alternative rock; pop
- Length: 4:16 (single version); 4:27 (album version)
- Label: Interscope
- Songwriters: Gwen Stefani; Tom Dumont
- Producers: Jerry Harrison; No Doubt

No Doubt singles chronology
"Hey You!" (1998)	"New" (1999)	"Ex-Girlfriend" (2000)

"New" is a song by American rock band No Doubt, written by band members Gwen Stefani and Tom Dumont for the Go soundtrack (1999). It was later included on No Doubt's fourth studio album Return of Saturn (2000). It's the first single as a quartet, after the departure of original keyboardist Eric Stefani in 1994. The song is available as a downloadable track for the music video game series Rock Band and Guitar Hero. The song was a complete departure from the band's previous singles, switching from a ska punk-influenced sound to more new wave-influenced sound.

== Background ==
The song was produced by ex-Talking Heads member Jerry Harrison in a one-time recording session in January 1999. Guitar pedals and effects are used to distort the sound of Adrian Young's drums. As for the guitar, Dumont's performance has been stated as greatly influenced by Devo, further contributing to the track's new wave feel.

The song was the first song to be recorded by No Doubt as a four-piece after original keyboardist Eric Stefani's departure in 1994 before promotion for Tragic Kingdom began.

Originally the song was intended to be a non-album single, but because of the success of the single in the Modern Rock Tracks, it was later included in their fourth album Return of Saturn.

== Chart performance ==
The song peaked at number seven on the Billboard Modern Rock Tracks chart. The single reached number thirty on the UK Singles Chart, becoming the band's fourth top-40 British single.

== Music video ==
Kanal's character (right) helps that of Stefani (left) get into a rave.

In the song's music video, which was directed by Jake Scott, each band member plays a character going to a rave with Tony Kanal wearing a sherwani. The video also debuted Stefani's new glam rock-influenced look, although in this video she still retains her platinum blonde hair but with violet highlights. She would dye her hair pink the following year to promote Return of Saturn.

The video won the award for the Most Stylish Video at the 1999 VH1/Vogue Fashion Awards. Joanne Gair worked with Stefani on her make-up.

== Track listings ==
American 12-inch vinyl single

1. "New" (New Doubt Club Mix) – 6:18
2. "New" (New & Approved Remix (Extended Edit)) – 6:20

German single

1. "New" (Single Version) – 4:15
2. New & Approved Remix – 5:40

German maxi single

1. "New" (Single Version) – 4:15
2. New & Approved Remix – 5:40
3. New & Approved Remix (Extended Edit) – 6:20
4. New Doubt Club Mix – 6:18

Australian CD maxi single

1. "New" (Single Version) – 4:15
1. "New" (New & Approved Remix) – 5:40
2. "New" (New & Approved Remix (Extended Version)) – 6:20
3. "New" (New Doubt Club Mix) – 6:18

- Note: The disc lists only the album version, the sleeve lists only remixes as tracks 1–3.

British CD single

1. "New" (Single Version) – 4:15
2. New & Approved Remix (Extended Edit) – 6:20
3. New & Approved Remix – 5:40

- Note: The disc incorrectly lists track 2 as (New Doubt Club Mix)

== Charts ==
=== Weekly charts ===
Chart (1999)	Peak position
Australia (ARIA)	89
Europe (Eurochart Hot 100)	95
Netherlands (Dutch Top 40 Tipparade)	13
Netherlands (Single Top 100)	98
Scottish Singles Sales (Official Charts)	30
UK Singles (Official Charts)	30
US Bubbling Under Hot 100 (Billboard)	23
US Alternative Airplay (Billboard)	7

=== Year-end charts ===
Chart (1999)	Position
US Modern Rock Tracks (Billboard)	26
