= Tom Dumont =

American guitarist and producer

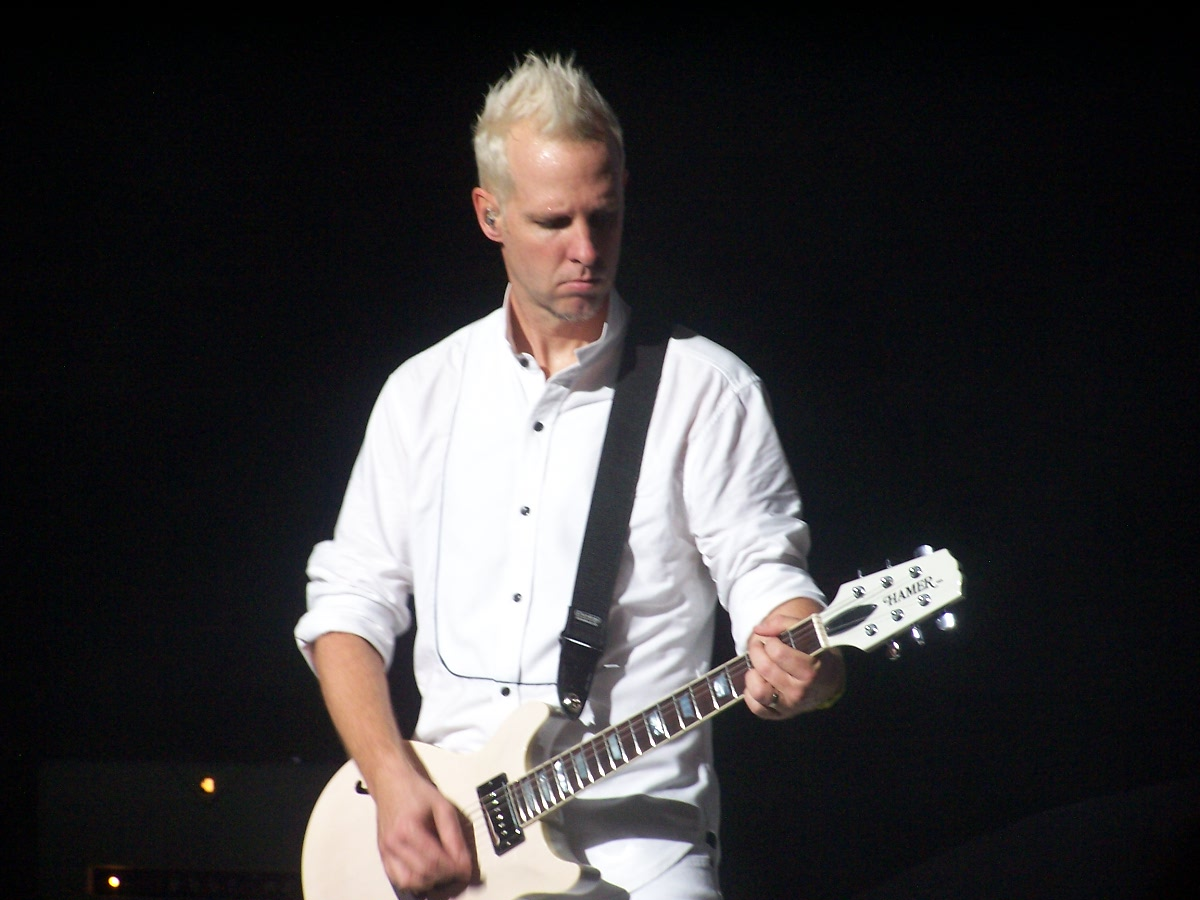
- Tom Dumont in 2009

Background information
- Born: Thomas Martin Dumont; January 11, 1968 (age 58); Los Angeles, California, U.S.
- Origin: Irvine, California, U.S.
- Genres: Ska punk; pop rock; new wave; alternative rock; pop-punk
- Occupations: Musician; producer; audio engineer
- Instruments: Guitar; keyboards; synthesizer; piano; vocals
- Years active: 1985–present
- Member of: No Doubt; Invincible Overlord; Dreamcar
- Website: tomdumont.com

Thomas Martin Dumont (born January 11, 1968) is an American musician and producer. Dumont is a member of third wave ska band No Doubt, and during the band's hiatus, he began Invincible Overlord as a side project and produced Matt Costa's Songs We Sing.

== Life and career ==
Born in Los Angeles, California, the Dumont family lived in Irvine, California. Tom was the only adopted child in his family and has two siblings. He has a sister named Gina and a brother named John. Dumont's father, who played the piano, gave his son a guitar at age twelve. Dumont practiced by strumming folk songs by the likes of James Taylor. Dumont was influenced by heavy metal bands such as Iron Maiden, Judas Priest and Kiss. He joined his older sister's heavy metal band Rising, but left in 1988 for third wave ska band No Doubt.

After graduating from Woodbridge High School in 1986, Dumont studied music theory for five semesters at Orange Coast College. He dropped out when he had to learn classical guitar, which was something he disliked. When the band moved into a house on Beacon Avenue in Anaheim, he wrote a poem about being addicted to television. He took the poem to Eric Stefani, who put the poem to music and came up with the song "Trapped in a Box". The song was recorded for the band's self-titled debut album and was the album's only single.

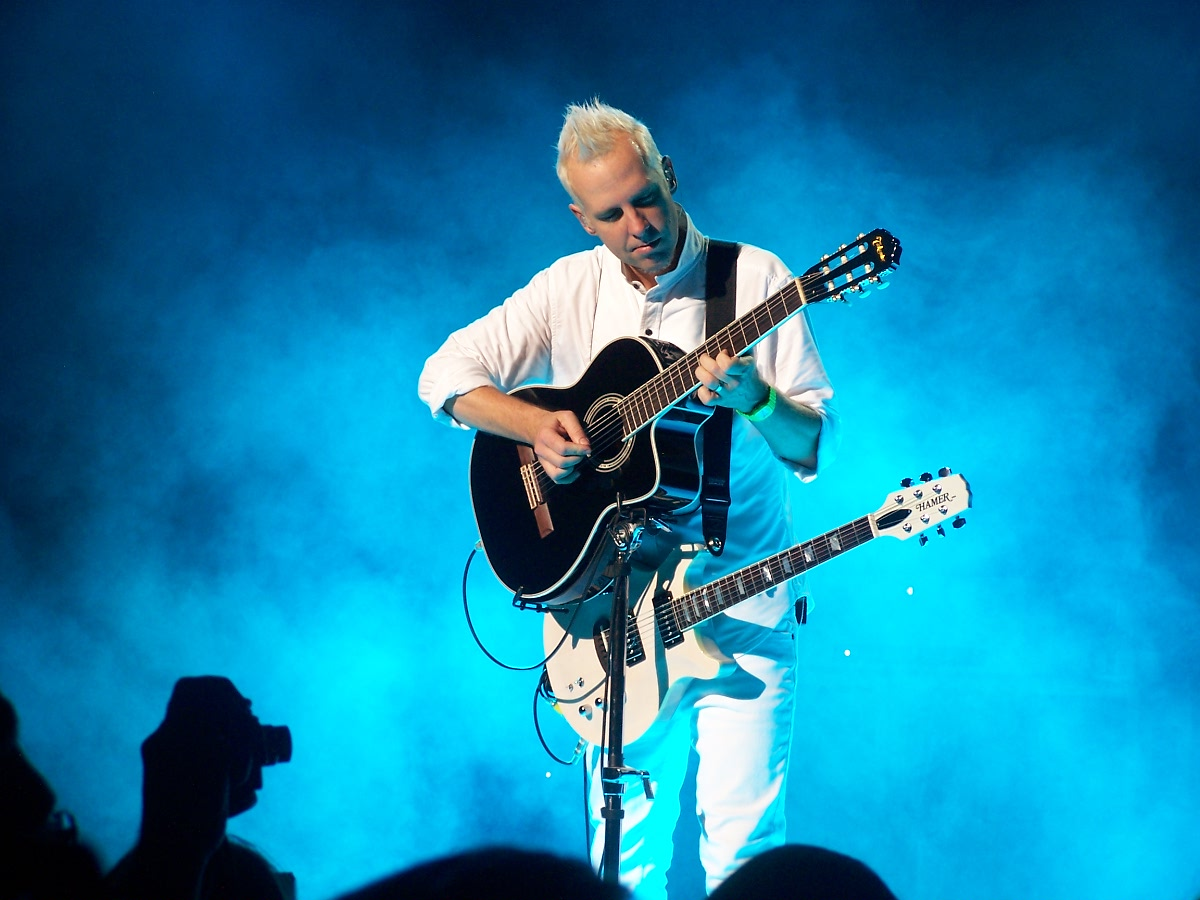
Tom Dumont on tour with No Doubt in 2009

The band later self-released The Beacon Street Collection in March 1995. The same month, Dumont left his job as a file clerk at a mortgage company. He had "a good feeling" about having finished recording Tragic Kingdom and planned to fall back on promoting rock concerts if the album was not successful. Tragic Kingdom became a commercial success, certified diamond in the United States and selling sixteen million copies worldwide. When Eric left the band, Tom, along with bandmates Gwen Stefani and Tony Kanal, took leadership in writing and composing responsibilities.

After the Tragic Kingdom tour, Tom returned to his home in Long Beach, California and started surfing in 1997. Dumont is a member of The Surfrider Foundation, an environmental organization to preserve coastal life. Since Eric Stefani left, Tom Dumont, Tony Kanal and Gwen Stefani became No Doubt's primary songwriters.

During No Doubt's hiatus, Dumont produced Matt Costa's 2005 debut album, titled Songs We Sing, after hearing a demo tape by Costa.

== Reunion with No Doubt ==
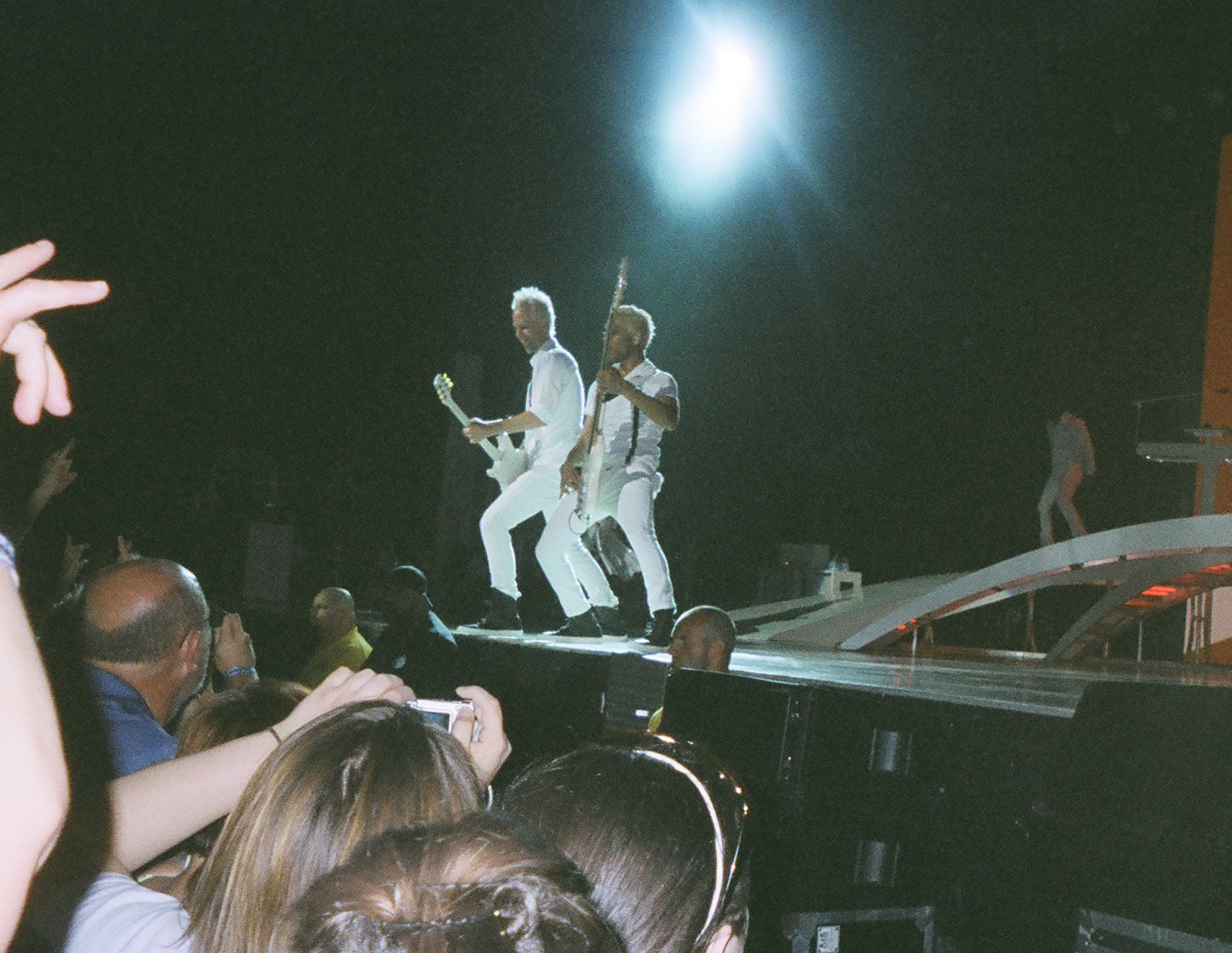
Dumont, along with Tony Kanal, during No Doubt's 2009 summer reunion tour.

With Stefani promoting her second solo album, No Doubt began initial work on a new album without her and planned to complete it after Stefani's tour was finished. In March 2008, the band started making posts concerning the progression of the album on their official fan forum. Stefani made a post on March 28, 2008, stating that songwriting had commenced but was slow on her end because she was, at the time, pregnant with her second child.

Manager Jim Guerinot said the yet-untitled album is being produced by Mark "Spike" Stent, who helped produce and mix Rock Steady. Between Stefani's pregnancy and recording, No Doubt did not tour in 2008, but Guerinot promised, they plan to hit the road hard in 2009 for their first full-fledged band tour in nearly five years.

No Doubt announced on their official website that they would tour in the summer of 2009 with Paramore, The Sounds, Janelle Monáe, Bedouin Soundclash, Katy Perry, and Panic! at the Disco while finishing their upcoming album, which was set to be released in 2010 but has been delayed. Tickets for the tour went on sale March 7, 2009. As a special promotion for the tour, the band is giving away their entire music catalog free as a digital download with purchase of top-tier seating.

In 2009, No Doubt made an appearance on the television series Gossip Girl, playing a fictional band called "Snowed Out" in the episode "Valley Girls". They performed their cover version of the Adam and the Ants song "Stand and Deliver".

In October 2025, No Doubt announced they would reunite in 2026 for a six-show residency in Las Vegas.

== Personal life ==
Dumont and his wife Mieke have three sons together: Ace Joseph Dumont, born April 6, 2006, Rio Atticus Dumont, born June 18, 2008, and Koa Thomas Dumont, born February 19, 2011. According to the band's record label representative, the couple was married in October 2004.

According to his No Doubt bandmates, when Dumont drinks alcohol, he shifts into his alter ego nicknamed "The Douche".

Dumont is an avid traveler, spending a good part of his free time on the road. He has been spotted in remote areas of the world with his wife and children.

On April 11, 2026, he announced a diagnosis of early-onset Parkinson's disease but confirmed he will continue to play.

== Equipment ==
Dumont is endorsed by Hamer Guitars and favors vintage MXR effect pedals. During live performances, he uses Kemper modeling amplifiers, but has also used Divided by Thirteen, Soldano, Vox, Matchless, Fender, and Silvertone amplifiers while recording. He uses Ernie Ball Regular Slinky strings.

=== Guitars ===
- Hamer Standard natural finish
- Hamer Vector
- Hamer Korina Standard
- Hamer Korina Junior
- Hamer Newport
- Hamer Newport with hum buckers
- Hamer Duotone

=== Effects ===
- MXR Phase 90
- MXR Phase 100
- MXR Blue Box
- MXR Micro Amp
- MXR Auto Q
- MXR Bass Octave Deluxe
- Dunlop Cry Baby Wah
- Dan-Echo
- Eventide Time Factor
- Eventide Mod Factor
- Malekko Ekko 616
- Tone Freak Effects Buff Puff
- Tone Freak Effects Naked OD

=== Amplifiers ===
- Divided by 13 RSA 31 Heads
- Divided by 13 4x12 Cabinets equipped with 16ohm Celestion G12M Greenbacks.
- Soldano SLO-100
- Matchless Clubman 35
- Fender Pro Junior
