= Excuse Me Mr. =

1996 single by No Doubt

- Disc appearance for US promo CD single

Single by No Doubt

from the album Tragic Kingdom
- Released: June 21, 1997 (Japan)
- Recorded: 1995
- Genre: Ska; ska punk; punk rock
- Length: 3:04
- Label: Interscope; Trauma
- Songwriters: Gwen Stefani; Tom Dumont
- Producer: Matthew Wilder

No Doubt singles chronology
"Sunday Morning" (1997)	"Excuse Me Mr." (1997)	"Happy Now?" (1997)

Music video
- "Excuse Me Mr." on YouTube

"Excuse Me Mr." is a song by American band No Doubt for their third studio album, Tragic Kingdom (1995). The song was written by Gwen Stefani and Tom Dumont, while produced by Matthew Wilder. It was released as a US radio single from the album on August 21, 1996, and released commercially in Japan in 1997. The song has also been included on the band's 2003 greatest hits album, The Singles 1992–2003. Musically, the former is a rock-influenced ska and ska punk track with lyrics describing a woman trying to get the attention of a man. A country version of the song was also created but never released. The single received positive reviews from music critics who labelled it a successful breakup song and as one of the best tracks on Tragic Kingdom.

Commercially, "Excuse Me Mr." had a minimal impact on record charts, reaching the top 40 of the alternative charts in both the United States and Canada and peaking at number 11 on the Official New Zealand Music Chart. Sophie Muller directed the accompanying music video in January 1997. The visual features two different storylines, with the first showing No Doubt playing the song to an empty room that eventually becomes crowded with paparazzi, while the second storyline has Stefani tying herself to train tracks in the hopes that a man will come to her rescue. No Doubt has performed the song for a number of live appearances, including during their 1995–97 Tragic Kingdom World Tour, on Saturday Night Live in December 1996 while serving as the guest musical act, and at the band's Return of Saturn Tour (2000).

== Background and release ==
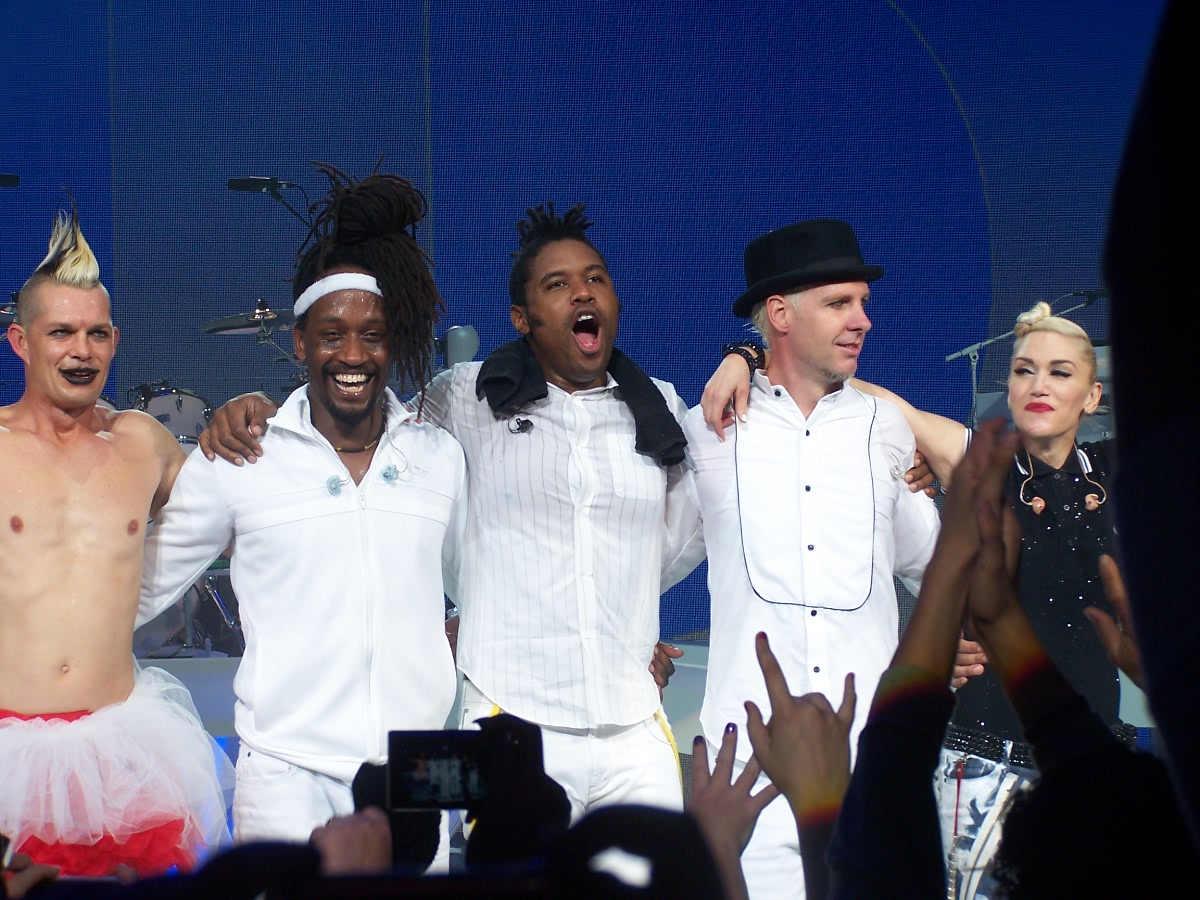
Two versions of "Excuse Me Mr." were created prior to its inclusion on Tragic Kingdom. No Doubt pushed for the release of the punk rock version while the song's producer, Matthew Wilder, preferred the country version.

"Excuse Me Mr." was written by Gwen Stefani and Tom Dumont, while produced by Matthew Wilder. It was featured as the second track on No Doubt's third studio album, Tragic Kingdom, which was released on October 10, 1995. The album was the band's first record with minimal contributions from Gwen's brother, Eric Stefani, who had left the group due to creative differences earlier in 1995. Kenneth Partridge from The A.V. Club felt that this encouraged the members of No Doubt to incorporate the influences that helped popularize the band; Partridge later stated that this allowed Tragic Kingdom songs like "You Can Do It", "Hey You!", and "Excuse Me Mr." to be recorded. The original version of "Excuse Me Mr." was more melodic and mellow, according to Tony Kanal, but the members preferred the "harder version" that was released as a single. No Doubt disagreed with their then-producer Wilder, who wanted the band to record a country-influenced rendition. Member Adrian Young said:

When we recorded ['Excuse Me Mr.'], we used to play it the way it is now, and our producer wanted us to play it almost kind of like a country-shuffle, and so we gave it a shot. We later decided that we didn’t really like that, but the other version was erased from the tape. We had to go back in—it must’ve been months later—we re-recorded it the way we used to play it.

According to the liner notes for No Doubt's 2003 greatest hits album, The Singles 1992–2003, the debate over which version of "Excuse Me Mr." would be featured on Tragic Kingdom became a debacle. The band told Interscope Records that they would refuse to record "Spiderwebs", the latter's eventual second single, unless they could re-record the punk rock version of "Excuse Me Mr.". The song was first released as an airplay single in the United States on August 21, 1996. Commercial CD singles for "Excuse Me Mr." were not distributed in the United States; however, promotional CD singles were created and sent to radio stations across that country. A Japanese promotional CD single was also made using the same cover art from No Doubt's "Sunday Morning" (1997).

== Composition and lyrics ==
Musically, "Excuse Me Mr." is a ska, ska punk and punk rock song that is reminiscent of No Doubt's previous releases. Partridge described the track as a rock-influenced song that pays homage to the music which helped form the band. Diffuser.fm's Brendan Manley noted the track's "Dixieland brass breakdown" during the bridge and cited "Excuse Me Mr." as an example of the one of many different styles of songs on Tragic Kingdom. David Browne discussed in his Entertainment Weekly review of the album that the track is able to combine various genres within a duration of three minutes.

According to Musicnotes.com, "Excuse Me Mr." is set in common time, with a double time-like feel and has a very fast tempo of 146 beats per minute. The key of the song is set in F major, with Gwen Stefani's vocal range spanning nearly an octave and a half, from A_{3} to F_{5} in scientific pitch notation. The song progresses in the following chord progressions of F–C–Dm–C in each of the two verses.

The song's lyrics describe a woman who is actively trying to capture the attention of a male. The message is the opposite of that conveyed within "Spiderwebs", and Stefani sings in an anxious tone. Partridge felt that the point in the song where it switches to circus music helps secure the idea that love is absurd. Loren Diblasi from MTV News noted that the lyrics of "Excuse Me Mr." suggest that No Doubt was detailing a painful breakup; Stefani sings during the middle eight, "It's almost as if I'm tied to the tracks / And I'm waiting for him to rescue me / The funny thing is, he's not going to come". These lyrics, specifically, were described as "sonically slapstick" by Noisey's Nick Levine, while Browne from Entertainment Weekly compared the lyrics' "rescue-me blankness" to Mariah Carey's songwriting abilities. Seija Rankin speculated that the subject of the song was Kanal, who Stefani had broken up with prior to writing the material for the album.

== Reception ==
"Excuse Me Mr." was met with positive reviews from music critics, with several describing it as one of the highlights on Tragic Kingdom. In honor of the 20th anniversary of the album, a panel of critics from The A.V. Club reanalyzed it. Annie Zaleski from the publication admired the track in addition to "Happy Now?" and "Sunday Morning"; she noted that all three of the songs "have just the right amount of pep". Marah Eakin described "Excuse Me Mr." as a "banger" that "aged well" despite being released over 20 years ago; she also selected the track as one of the album's singles that sounds "fucking good". Expressing a similar opinion, Ilana Kaplan from The New York Observer called it "one of the buzzy tracks that erupted" from Tragic Kingdom; she also classified the track as perhaps the "fastest song ever made". Diblasi was impressed by the track and listed it as the fifth-best "breakup song" on the album. She also found the track to be emotive and one of the "most gut-wrenching tracks" on Tragic Kingdom because of its ability to help someone "survive a breakup".

In the US, "Excuse Me Mr." peaked at number 17 on Billboard's Alternative Airplay chart. It did not enter the RPM singles chart in Canada, though it did reach the Top Rock/Alternative Tracks chart, with the track debuting at number 27. Similarly, it became the fourth consecutive entry from Tragic Kingdom to make an appearance on the chart. During its 9th week within the rankings, the track reached a peak of number 12 on March 31, 1997. Outside of the alternative charts in the United States and Canada, "Excuse Me Mr." only charted in one country. On May 25, 1997, the song debuted at number 38 on the Official New Zealand Music Chart. The track ultimately peaked at number 11, becoming the 4th top 40 entry from the album.

== Music video ==
In the music video for "Excuse Me Mr.", Stefani ties herself down to rail tracks in hopes that Dumont, Kanal, or Young will save her, mirroring the lyrics of the song.

The music video for "Excuse Me Mr." was directed by Sophie Muller and released in early 1997. It served as the fourth of five videos created for the songs of Tragic Kingdom. Filming for the visual had been completed by January 1997 and took place around No Doubt's touring schedule.

The video opens with the band performing in a dimly-lit room. As the camera pans to the other members, Stefani tries her best to remain in front of it whenever possible, with her resorting to pushing them out of her way. Various women dressed in vaudeville-inspired outfits are spaced evenly throughout the room and dance provocatively, as the camera approaches them. Before the song's second verse begins, Stefani ties herself to rail tracks in front of an oncoming train with the hopes that nearby people Dumont, Kanal, or Young will come to her rescue. The men fail to do so and Stefani stands up, departs the scene and reenters the dark room. The band resumes playing while a group of paparazzi enters and disrupts them. The video ends with No Doubt posing for a group picture in front of the paparazzi.

The clip was selected for rotation on several music-related television networks, including MTV, where it charted within the top 10 on the channel's official "most-played clips" playlist. In 2004, the video was featured on No Doubt's compilation DVD The Videos 1992–2003. It was also included as a bonus feature on the second CD of a two part CD single series for "Spiderwebs" that was released exclusively in the United Kingdom.

== Live performances ==
"Excuse Me Mr." was performed as the second song on No Doubt's 1995–97 Tragic Kingdom World Tour. The performance of the song at the July 1, 1997 show in Anaheim, at The Arrowhead Pond, was recorded and released on the band's first live album, Live in the Tragic Kingdom (1997). On the December 7, 1996 episode of the American television series Saturday Night Live, No Doubt served as the special musical guest, whereas Martin Short was the episode's host. During their appearances, they performed their previous single, "Don't Speak", followed by "Excuse Me Mr.".

The song was performed for No Doubt's Return of Saturn Tour in 2000. A majority of the tracks performed during the event featured Stefani singing about marriage and romance, but when No Doubt returned with tracks from Tragic Kingdom, like the song and "Happy Now?", Rolling Stone's Greg Kot found the audience to be more engaged. Kanal and Stefani "bounc[ed]" around the stage during the performance, and Kot compared Stefani's vocals to a cross between cartoon character Betty Boop and American performer Lydia Lunch. For No Doubt's 2002 Rock Steady Tour, the song was performed during the concert's middle segment, in between them singing "In My Head" and "Different People". The band's performance of "Excuse Me Mr." at the November 22–23 and 29, 2002 shows at the Long Beach Convention and Entertainment Center in Long Beach were recorded and featured on their second live album, Rock Steady Live (2003).

During a reunion concert in 2009, their first official show since 2004, No Doubt performed a revised version of "Excuse Me Mr." to the crowd. According to Rolling Stone's Christopher R. Weingarten, the song had a "radical makeover" as it was "slowed down and skanked [sic] up until it sounded like the English Beat". At the first Rock in Rio USA music festival in 2015, No Doubt headlined the main stage during the beginning day of the event. They performed several songs from Tragic Kingdom, including "Don't Speak", "Sunday Morning", and "Excuse Me Mr.".

== Track listings ==
US promotional CD single
No.	Title	Length
1.	"Excuse Me Mr."	3:05

Japanese CD single
No.	Title	Length
1.	"Excuse Me Mr."	3:20
2.	"Sunday Morning" (radio edit)	4:14
3.	"Just a Girl" (live)	5:37
4.	"Don't Speak" (live)	5:26

== Credits and personnel ==
Credits adapted from the liner notes of Tragic Kingdom.

- Gwen Stefani – writer, vocals
- Tony Kanal – bass
- Matthew Wilder – producer
- Adrian Young – drums, percussion
- Tom Dumont – writer, guitar
- Eric Stefani – keyboards, piano
- Phil Jordan – trumpet
- Robert Vosgien – mastering
- David Holman – mixing
- Paul Palmer – mixing
- Phil Kaffel – recording
- George Landress – recording

== Charts ==
=== Weekly charts ===
Weekly chart performance for "Excuse Me Mr."
Chart (1997)	Peak position
Canada Rock/Alternative (RPM)	12
New Zealand (Recorded Music NZ)	11
US Alternative Airplay (Billboard)	17

=== Year-end charts ===
Year-end chart performance for "Excuse Me Mr."
Chart (1997)	Position
US Modern Rock Tracks (Billboard)	89

== Release history ==
Release dates and formats for "Excuse Me Mr."
Region	Date	Format	Label(s)	Ref.
United States	August 21, 1996	Promotional CD	Interscope; Trauma	
Japan	June 21, 1997	CD	Interscope	
