= Sunday Morning (No Doubt song) =

1997 single by No Doubt

Single by No Doubt

from the album Tragic Kingdom
- Released: May 27, 1997
- Genre: Ska; ska punk
- Length: 4:33
- Label: Interscope; Trauma
- Songwriters: Gwen Stefani; Eric Stefani; Tony Kanal
- Producer: Matthew Wilder

No Doubt singles chronology
"Don't Speak" (1996)	"Sunday Morning" (1997)	"Excuse Me Mr." (1997)

Music video
- "Sunday Morning" on YouTube

"Sunday Morning" is a song by American band No Doubt for their third studio album, Tragic Kingdom (1995). It was written by Gwen Stefani, Eric Stefani, and Tony Kanal, produced by Matthew Wilder, and released as the record's fifth single on May 27, 1997. The song has also been included on their 2003 greatest hits album, The Singles 1992–2003. Its lyrics describe a romantic relationship that ended in a breakup and was inspired by a discussion that Gwen Stefani had with Kanal. The song has been described as a ska and ska punk recording with elements of reggae and Motown.

"Sunday Morning" received largely positive reviews from music critics who frequently deemed it a standout track on Tragic Kingdom. It has since been included on critics' lists of best No Doubt and Stefani-penned songs. The song was not released as a commercial single in the United States, making it ineligible to enter the Billboard Hot 100 chart due to rules at the time. However, it managed to peak at number 35 on the Mainstream Top 40 component chart. It also reached number two in Iceland and the top 40 in Australia and Canada. Elsewhere, the song obtained lower positions.

The song's music video, directed by Sophie Muller, was the fifth and final video made for Tragic Kingdom. It features the band playing "Sunday Morning" in a garage to a lonesome man who strolled past their house. No Doubt later prepares a large dinner for themselves and once they settle in their backyard to eat, they engage in a food fight. The band has performed the single during many of their live appearances, including at their 1995–97 Tragic Kingdom World Tour and while serving as the guest musical act on The Tonight Show with Jay Leno in April 1997. Stefani, individually, performed the track at her 2018–21 concert residency in Las Vegas.

== Background and release ==
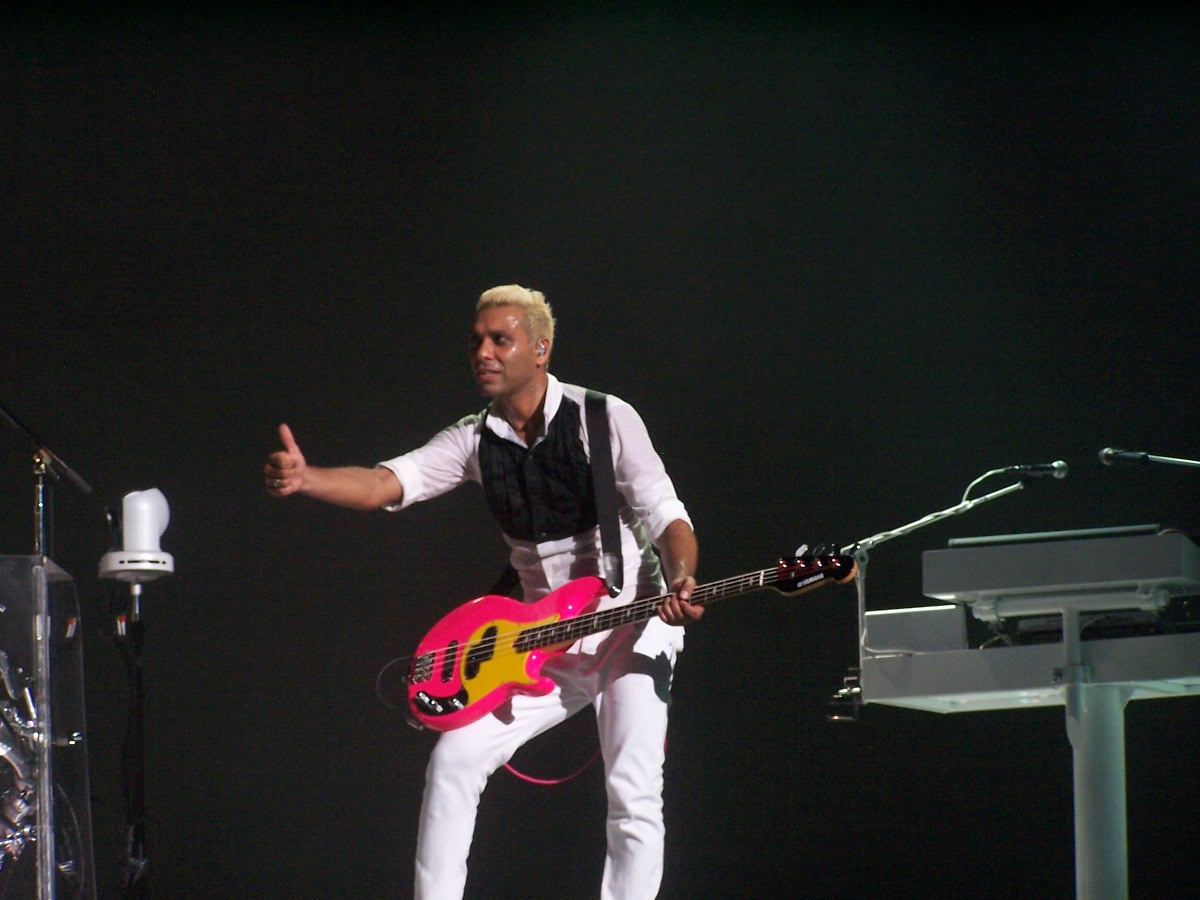
No Doubt's bassist Tony Kanal (pictured) has called "Sunday Morning" his favorite No Doubt song.

"Sunday Morning" was written by Gwen Stefani, Eric Stefani, and Tony Kanal. The song was written by Eric Stefani prior to his departure from the group, who left due to creative differences in the beginning of 1995. Because of his absence, Gwen Stefani resumed the role as a songwriter which resulted in ultra-personal songs that described her personal and romantic life. Songs written during this period were anticipated for inclusion on Tragic Kingdom (1995), the group's third studio album and first with Interscope Records since their debut, No Doubt, in 1992. The material on Tragic Kingdom documented Stefani's former relationship with Kanal, which had lasted seven years. Kanal referred to "Sunday Morning" as his favorite No Doubt song in an interview with Rolling Stone magazine in 1997.

For the commercial CD single released created to promote the single, none of them were held in the United States. Instead, promotional copies were sent to radio stations for airplay in that country. The copy included both the radio edit and album versions of "Sunday Morning". A promotional VHS single was created by Interscope Geffen A&M Records. Other promotional releases as CD singles occurred in France and Spain that used the radio edit and album version, respectively. On May 27, 1997, in Australia and Sweden, the CD maxi single featured the single plus No Doubt (1992) track "Get on the Ball" and live versions of Tragic Kingdom album tracks "Just a Girl", "Don't Speak", and "Hey You". The Philippines promotional cassette single includes an identical track listing on both the A-side and B-side. A two-part CD single series released in the United Kingdom in 1997 includes "Sunday Morning", the official music video as a CD-ROM feature, and live versions of their songs "By the Way", "Different People", "Oi to the World", and "Tragic Kingdom". The promotional Japanese CD maxi single uses previous single "Excuse Me Mr." as the opening track and follows with "Sunday Morning", and live versions of "Just a Girl" and "Don't Speak".

== Composition and lyrics ==
"Sunday Morning" has been described as a ska, ska punk, and hard rock song. It contains elements of reggae music and was compared, musically, to the style of typical Motown releases. Rolling Stone's Chris Heath compared the sound of "Sunday Morning" to English singer Kim Wilde's 1981 debut single "Kids in America". The song was produced by Matthew Wilder, the executive producer for Tragic Kingdom. Instrumentation consists of Kanal on Bass, Adrian Young on drums and percussion, Tom Dumont on guitar, Eric Stefani on piano and keyboards, and Phil Jordan on trumpet.

According to the official sheet music published at Musicnotes.com, "Sunday Morning" is set in common time and has a moderately fast tempo of 157 beats per minute. The key of the song is in E major, with Stefani's vocal range spanning one octave from B_{3} to C_{5} in scientific pitch notation. The song opens with an extended instrumental and then follows chord progressions of E-C♯m-E-C♯m in the verses. Heath described the sound transition after the introduction as "a thumping combination of Motown and pop cheese".

According to the liner notes of the group's 2003 greatest hits album, The Singles 1992–2003, Stefani brainstormed the lyrics to "Sunday Morning" after speaking with Kanal through a bathroom door while at his parents' house in Yorba Linda, California. She later revisited the lyrics and edited them to describe a breakup. Chris Heath from Rolling Stone described the song as "one of the meanest" on Tragic Kingdom and summarized the lyrical content as "Girl used to go out with boy and act pathetic and over-dependent, but now the tables are turned". Rather than taking on the persona of a victim, Stefani plays the conqueror; as heard in the song's bridge, Stefani thanks her ex lover and remarks: "Now you're the parasite!"

== Critical reception ==
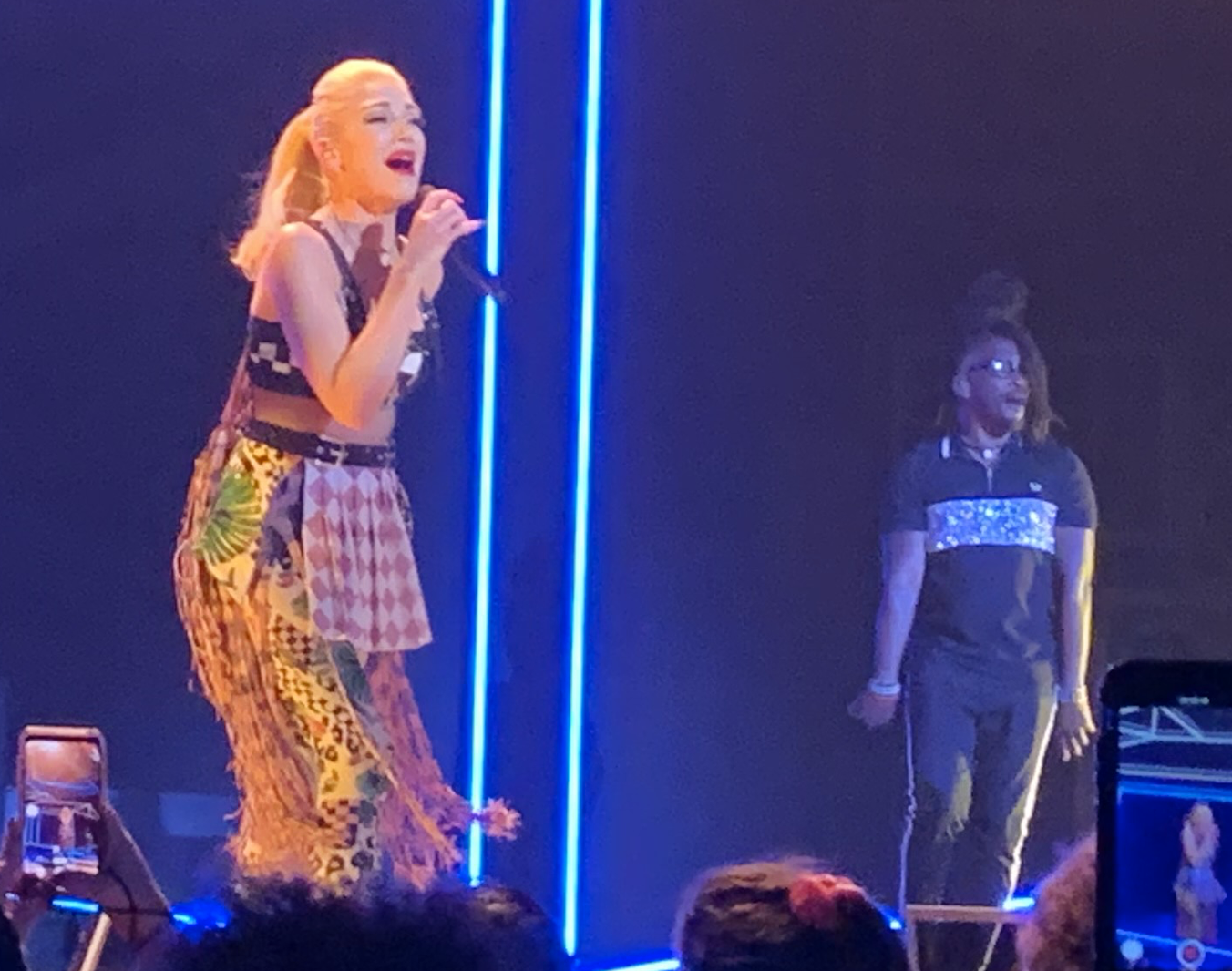
Gwen Stefani (left) performing "Sunday Morning" with No Doubt touring member Stephen Bradley (right) during the Just a Girl show in 2019.

Professional critiques of "Sunday Morning" have been largely positive, both at the time of its release and retrospectively. Partridge, writing for Billboard, singled out Stefani's role as a songwriter, praising her ability to write after "constantly gaining and losing the upper hand in her romantic adventures". Mike Boehm from the Los Angeles Times stated that "Sunday Morning" is an example of "the band's improved craft" on Tragic Kingdom and complimented its ability to correlate well with the conceptual themes of the album.

In honor of the 20th anniversary of the album, a panel of critics from The A.V. Club reanalyzed Tragic Kingdom. Annie Zaleski from the publication admired the track in addition to "Happy Now?" and "Excuse Me Mr."; she noted that all three of them "have just the right amount of pep". Alex McLevy was critical of Tragic Kingdom but wrote: "Luckily, 'Sunday Morning' is there to remind you just how good the band can be when it gets the recipe right." Marah Eakin, also from The A.V. Club, claimed that the single aged well despite being two decades old. She also described it as her favorite song on the parent album. In a poll held by Rolling Stone in 2016, Brittany Spanos asked her readers to vote on "The 10 Best Gwen Stefani Songs". "Sunday Morning" took fourth place and Spanos' consensus stated: "Stefani is a powerhouse on the raucous, bitter single. [...] From the moment Adrian Young's opening drum solo builds up, the song grows more and more massive and searing."

== Chart performance ==
"Sunday Morning" was not released as a commercial single in the United States and therefore was ineligible to enter the Billboard Hot 100 chart. Despite its minimal commercial impression, the song charted on Billboard's Mainstream Top 40 airplay chart. The single peaked at number 35 during the magazine issue of June 20, 1997 and spent four weeks on the chart altogether. It became the fourth single from Tragic Kingdom to appear on the chart and is the group's lowest charting entry to date. Partridge reflected on the song's mediocre impact on the record charts positively, writing: "[it] didn't chart as high, but the damage was done. Gwen was a major celebrity, No Doubt was on its way to becoming one of the decade's biggest bands."

In Canada, the single entered the RPM Top Singles chart at number 91 during the week of May 19, 1997. Its position improved weekly before reaching a peak of number 33 in it its tenth week. It also was ranked within the country's Adult Contemporary and Rock/Alternative songs charts, where it peaked at positions 41 and 21, respectively. The single achieved significant success in Australia, where it entered the ARIA Singles Chart. It debuted at number 45 during the listing ending June 1, 1997 and rose to its peak position at number 21 in its sixth week. In total, the song charted for nineteen consecutive weeks in Australia. At the annual year-end tally in 1997, "Sunday Morning" was listed as the year's 84th most successful song. It also received a gold certification from the ARIA that same year for shipments of 35,000 copies in that country.

"Sunday Morning" also charted in several countries in Europe. On the UK Singles Chart published by the Official Charts Company, it debuted and peaked at number 50 on December 20, 1997. It became the fourth consecutive entry by the band from Tragic Kingdom, but also the lowest performing one. On the Íslenski Listinn Topp 40 chart in Iceland, the single reached the number two position. It later became the country's tenth best-selling song of 1997. In Scotland, the song reached number 42 on the singles chart. In Sweden, the song peaked at number 55.

== Music video ==
The members of No Doubt engage in a food fight in the "Sunday Morning" video.

The corresponding music video to "Sunday Morning" was directed by Sophie Muller and was the fifth and final video produced from Tragic Kingdom. Muller was originally asked to work with the group for "Just a Girl" in 1995, but the opportunity fell through. However, she later had the chance to direct the music video for "Don't Speak" that same year. After releasing that video, the band determined they wanted the next one filmed to use an opposite concept. During an interview with Complex magazine in 2012, Dumont spoke about the meaning of the music video for "Sunday Morning":

That video was just trying to capture that kind of really simple, silly, sweet story of our friendship. Especially coming after 'Don't Speak,' because the 'Don't Speak' video was about us fighting, and who wanted to come back to that? Both of those videos were fictional, but covered different aspects of our friendship.

The video was filmed in the Anaheim Colony Historical District, including at the Armbrust–Pember House, which belonged to Stefani's mother and late grandparents.

=== Synopsis ===
The video opens with No Doubt beginning to perform "Sunday Morning" in a small garage. Their music captures the attention of a lonesome man (Terry Hall) strolling past them, who decides to watch them play from a nearby swing. As the song's chorus begins, Stefani sits down in a chair, changes into a leopard pair of shoes, and departs the garage in order to shop at a nearby grocery store. While she purchases several cans of tomato sauce from the store, the other band members begin preparing dinner in the kitchen. As Stefani slices a tomato with a knife, she cuts her finger and Dumont accidentally drops a kettle of spaghetti sauce on the floor. She and Dumont clean up the mess and enter the backyard to begin the meal. While eating, Dumont initiates a food fight and the others join in. The videos ends with Hall watching the group from afar.

The video uses the radio edit of the song, which is slightly shortened and remixed from the original album version, with slightly louder and re-panned guitars.

== Live performances ==
"Sunday Morning" was performed during the dates of their 1995–97 Tragic Kingdom World Tour. The performance of the song at the July 1, 1997 show in Anaheim, at The Arrowhead Pond, was recorded and released as part of the band's first live album, Live in the Tragic Kingdom (1997). On April 11, 1997, No Doubt served as the sole musical guest for an episode of The Tonight Show with Jay Leno. The band performed the single to Leno's studio audience. At the Rock Steady Tour in 2002, No Doubt performed "Sunday Morning" after opening the concert with their 2002 single "Hella Good". Their performances from the November 22–23 and 29, 2002 shows in Long Beach at the Long Beach Convention and Entertainment Center were recorded and featured on the group's second live album, Rock Steady Live (2003).

At the inaugural Rock in Rio USA music festival in 2015, No Doubt headlined the main stage during the first day of the event. They performed several songs from Tragic Kingdom, including "Don't Speak", "Sunday Morning", and "Excuse Me Mr.". In 2018, Stefani began her Just a Girl concert residency at the Planet Hollywood Resort Las Vegas. She performed "Sunday Morning" as the sixth song in the concert's set list. For the performance, the stage was decorated as a garage house party and accented with neon-colored objects and speakers. At the shows, Stefani wore a tank top stylized with her name in black, sports red lipstick, and her signature platinum blonde hair.

== Track listings and formats ==
Australia and Sweden CD maxi-single

1. "Sunday Morning" (Radio Edit) – 4:14
2. "Just a Girl" (Live) – 5:37
3. "Don't Speak" (Live) – 5:26
4. "Hey You" (Live) – 3:20
5. "Get on the Ball" – 3:32

Europe CD maxi-single (Part 1)

1. "Sunday Morning" – 4:32
2. "Sunday Morning" (Live) – 9:20
3. "Oi to the World" (Live) – 2:42
4. "By the Way" (Live) – 3:54

Europe CD maxi-single (Part 2)

1. "Sunday Morning" – 4:32
2. "Different People" (Live) – 6:31
3. "Tragic Kingdom" (Live) – 4:03
4. "Sunday Morning" (Music Video) – 4:18

France promotional CD single

1. "Sunday Morning" (Radio Edit) – 4:14

Japan promotional CD maxi-single

1. "Excuse Me Mr." – 3:20
2. "Sunday Morning" (Radio Edit) – 3:20
3. "Just a Girl" (Live) – 5:37
4. "Don't Speak" (Live) – 5:26

Philippines cassette maxi-single

- A1. "Sunday Morning" (Radio Edit) – 4:14
- A2. "Just a Girl" (Live) – 5:37
- A3. "Don't Speak" (Live) – 5:26
- A4. "Hey You" (Live) – 3:20
- A5. "Get on the Ball" – 3:32
- B1. "Sunday Morning" (Radio Edit) – 4:14
- B2. "Just a Girl" (Live) – 5:37
- B3. "Don't Speak" (Live) – 5:26
- B4. "Hey You" (Live) – 3:20
- B5. "Get on the Ball" – 3:32

Spain promotional CD single

1. "Sunday Morning" – 4:26

US promotional CD single

1. "Sunday Morning" (Radio Edit) – 4:14
2. "Sunday Morning" (Album Version) – 4:26

US promotional VHS single

1. "Sunday Morning" (Music Video) – 4:18

== Credits and personnel ==
Credits adapted from the liner notes of Tragic Kingdom.

- Gwen Stefani – writer, vocals
- Tony Kanal – writer, bass
- Eric Stefani – writer, keyboards, piano
- Matthew Wilder – producer
- Adrian Young – drums, percussion
- Tom Dumont – guitar
- Phil Jordan – trumpet
- Robert Vosgien – mastering
- David Holman – mixing
- Paul Palmer – mixing
- Phil Kaffel – recording
- George Landress – recording

== Charts ==
=== Weekly charts ===
Weekly chart performance for "Sunday Morning"
Chart (1997)	Peak position
Australia (ARIA)	21
Canada Top Singles (RPM)	33
Canada Adult Contemporary (RPM)	41
Canada Rock/Alternative (RPM)	21
Iceland (Íslenski Listinn Topp 40)	2
New Zealand (Recorded Music NZ)	42
Scottish Singles Sales (Official Charts)	41
Sweden (Sverigetopplistan)	55
UK Singles (Official Charts)	50
US Pop Airplay (Billboard)	35

=== Year-end charts ===
Year-end chart performance for "Sunday Morning"
Chart (1997)	Position
Australia (ARIA)	84
Iceland (Íslenski Listinn Topp 40)	10

== Certifications ==
Certifications for "Sunday Morning"
Region	Certification	Certified units/sales
Australia (ARIA)	Gold	35,000^{^}
United States (RIAA)	Gold	500,000^{‡}
^{^} Shipments figures based on certification alone.^{‡} Sales+streaming figures based on certification alone.

== Release history ==
Release dates and formats for "Sunday Morning"
Region	Date	Format	Label(s)	Ref.
Australia	May 27, 1997	CD maxi-single	Interscope; Trauma	
Sweden	May 27, 1997	CD maxi-single	Interscope; Trauma	
Europe	1997	CD single (Part 1)	Interscope; Trauma; Universal Music Group	
Europe	1997	CD single (Part 2)	Interscope; Trauma; Universal Music Group	
France	1997	Promotional CD single	Interscope; Trauma; Universal Music Group	
Spain	1997	Promotional CD single	Interscope; MCA	
United States	1997	Promotional CD single	Interscope; Trauma	
Philippines	1997	Cassette	Interscope; Trauma	
Japan	1997	Promotional CD maxi-single	Interscope	
United States	1997	Promotional VHS single	Interscope; Geffen; A&M	
