= Rock Steady Live =

Video by No Doubt
- Released: November 25, 2003
- Recorded: November 22, 2002
- Venue: Long Beach Arena (Long Beach, California)
- Genre: Ska punk; reggae; alternative rock
- Length: 90:00
- Label: Interscope
- Director: Sophie Muller

No Doubt chronology
Live in the Tragic Kingdom (1997)	Rock Steady Live (2003)	The Videos 1992–2003 (2004)

Rock Steady Live is a video album by American ska punk band No Doubt, released on DVD on November 25, 2003 under the Interscope records label. The DVD was directed by Sophie Muller. It is a recording of two of No Doubt's concerts during their Rock Steady Tour in 2002 to promote their fifth studio album, Rock Steady, which was released in December 2001. The material was recorded in November 2002 in Long Beach Arena, California. The concert features performances of seventeen songs from the band's previous three albums: Tragic Kingdom, Return of Saturn and Rock Steady; extras include performances of four extra songs, interviews with the band members, and backstage footage of the tour.

Rock Steady Live was released alongside The Singles 1992-2003, a greatest hits album, and Boom Box, a box set containing two CDs and two DVDs. No Doubt then went into hiatus, allowing singer Gwen Stefani to pursue solo projects. The DVD received mixed reviews, with critics praising the band's variety of musical styles. The DVD was certified gold by the Recording Industry Association of America and platinum by the Argentine Chamber of Phonograms and Videograms Producers.

== Background ==
After spending January to August 2001 writing and recording, No Doubt released their fifth studio album Rock Steady on December 11, 2001. They released four singles from it between October 2001 and July 2003: "Hey Baby", "Hella Good", "Underneath It All" and "Running". The album sold over three million copies. It was certified double platinum by the Recording Industry Association of America, indicating sales of over two million units, gold by the Australian Recording Industry Association, indicating sales of over 35,000 units, platinum by the Canadian Recording Industry Association, indicating sales of over 100,000 units, and silver by the British Phonographic Industry, indicating sales of over 60,000 units.

In 2002, No Doubt embarked on their Rock Steady Tour, beginning with two dates outside the mainland United States on March 14 and 16 in Puerto Rico and Venezuela, before starting their main tour in Sacramento, California on March 18, travelling across the U.S. and ending in Anaheim, California in November. Some performances featured burlesque group, The Pussycat Dolls. The concerts received positive reviews, with reviewers complimenting the variety of musical styles, elaborate stage and costume design and crowd interaction.

In April 2003, No Doubt went into hiatus, before coming together in September 2003 to compile various retrospective works and record a new single: "It's My Life". Singer Gwen Stefani went on to record two solo albums: Love. Angel. Music. Baby., released in November 2004, and The Sweet Escape, released in December 2006.

== Content and release ==
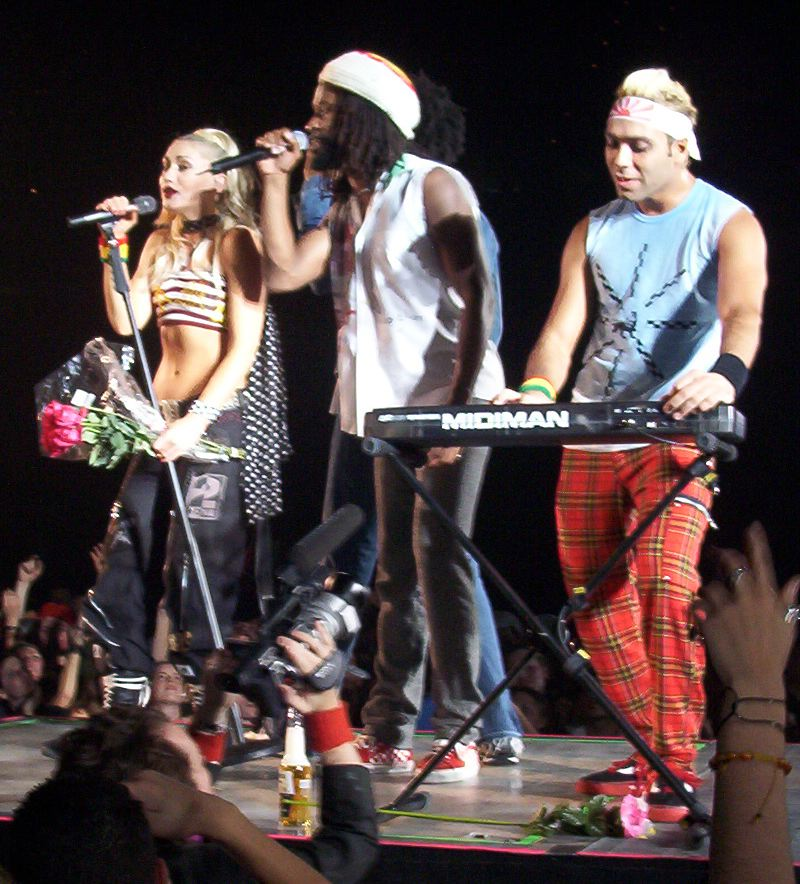
Stefani, Bradley and Kanal performing on the Rock Steady Tour in Sacramento, California on March 18, 2002.

Rock Steady Live was released on DVD on the Interscope Records label on November 23, 2003. On the same day, both The Singles 1992–2003 and Boom Box were also released by the band. The Singles 1992–2003 is a greatest hits album, featuring thirteen of No Doubt's previous singles, "Trapped in a Box" from their first album No Doubt and new single, "It's My Life". Boom Box is a box set, containing Live in the Tragic Kingdom, a recording of a concert as part of the band's Tragic Kingdom Tour, The Singles 1992-2003, The Videos 1992-2003, compilation of the band's music videos, and Everything in Time, a collection of B-sides and rare songs. The DVD was directed by Sophie Muller, who also produced the band's previous video release, Live in the Tragic Kingdom.

The DVD contains a recording the two concerts performed in Long Beach Arena, California during No Doubt's Rock Steady Tour. The concert features performances of 17 songs: "Just a Girl", "Spiderwebs", "Don't Speak" and "Sunday Morning" from No Doubt's third album Tragic Kingdom; "New", Ex-Girlfriend", "Simple Kind of Life", "Bathwater" and "Magic's in the Makeup" from their fourth album Return of Saturn; and "Hey Baby", "Underneath It All", "Hella Good", "Running", "Don't Let Me Down", "In My Head", "Platinum Blonde Life" and "Rock Steady" from their fifth album Rock Steady.

The DVD also includes over an hour and a half of extra features. There are live performances of an extra four songs: "Excuse Me Mr." and "Different People" from Tragic Kingdom, "Trapped in a Box" from their first album No Doubt and "Total Hate" from their second album, The Beacon Street Collection. Also included are an interview with Liam Lynch, a friend of the band; documentary pieces featuring interviews with each band member: Tom Dumont, Tony Kanal, Gwen Stefani, Adrian Young and two touring members Stephen Bradley and Gabrial McNair; backstage footage of the tour; and footage of the band receiving the "Key to the City" of Anaheim, California from Mayor Tom Daly on November 22, 2002 on KROQ-FM radio.

== Reception ==
=== Certifications ===
"Rock Steady Live" was certified platinum by the Argentine Chamber of Phonograms and Videograms Producers in 2004, indicating sales of over 40,000 units. The DVD was certified gold by the Recording Industry Association of America in December 2004, indicating sales of over 50,000 units.

=== Critical reception ===
Professional ratings
Review scores
Source	Rating
Allmovie	3/5 stars
Allmusic	2/5 stars
MusicOMH	(positive)
Rockfeedback	4/5 stars
The Age	3.5/5 stars

The video received mixed reviews from critics. Allmovie reviewer Michael Hastings commented that the band "has managed to stay fresh and inventive after more than a decade together", praising their "skills as a touring act". He stated that the DVD encompassed a "virtual career retrospective of the band and its hits", from its "ska-punk roots into the pop realm". In particular, he complimented the performances of "Don't Speak", "Hey Baby" and "Just a Girl", giving the DVD 3 out of 5 stars. Allmusic reviewer Hal Horowitz, however, described the music as so "radically doctored" that "it is nothing like what the crowd at the venue heard". He criticised the DVD for its heavy editing, the vocals for being "heavily and consistently overdubbed" and the editing for being "breathlessly nervous". However, he complimented the band's "high-energy" performance, calling Gwen Stefani "a whirlwind of activity, strutting, preening, pouting, and prancing". He gave the DVD 2 stars out of 5. The Age reviewer Andrew Murfett gave a positive review, calling the sound quality "excellent" and praising the "glossy close-ups to grainy back shots" of the camerawork. He described No Doubt as "endurable" and commented that the set list "stands out [as the band's greatest hits]".

MusicOMH reviewer Mark Fielding gave the DVD a positive review, calling the DVD a "very desirable package" and "must for any No Doubt fan out there". He described the band as "one of the most versatile bands on the planet", performing a "mish-mash of rock, ska, reggae [and] punk" and calling Stefani's performance "her gorgeous hyperactive best". He complimented the camera work as providing "superb" pictures and sound, stating that they "[captured] the concert in all its fast and furious glory". In particular, he praised the performances of "Hella Good", "Hey Baby", "Don't Speak", "Ex-Girlfriend" and "Spiderwebs" and the inclusion of so many extra features. Rockfeedback.com reviewer Samantha Hall gave the DVD a positive review, calling the music "fun" and the DVD more representative of No Doubt's greatest hits album, The Singles 1992-2003, than their fifth studio album Rock Steady. She complimented the focus of the footage covering all four band members plus two touring members, instead of just singer Stefani, and the dancing: "the wind n' grind dancehall moments", "the No Doubt signature-stamp" and "a seemingly inexhaustible torrent of jumps and high kicks". Hall singled out the performance of "Magic's In The Make-up", an album track from Return of Saturn, as the highlight of the DVD. She praised the live footage as "resplendent in near-perfection", describing the "wide range of dishy, fancy close-ups and pausing effects" and calling the sound "precision-balanced, distinct and clear". She gave the DVD 4 stars out of 5.

== Track listing ==
=== Concert ===
No.	Title	Writer(s)	Length
1.	"Hella Good"	Chad Hugo, Tony Kanal, Pharrell Williams, Gwen Stefani
2.	"Sunday Morning"	Kanal, Eric Stefani, G. Stefani
3.	"Ex-Girlfriend"	Tom Dumont, Kanal, G. Stefani
4.	"Underneath It All"	G. Stefani, David Stewart
5.	"Platinum Blonde Life"	Dumont, Kanal, G. Stefani
6.	"Bathwater"	Dumont, Kanal, G. Stefani
7.	"Don't Let Me Down"	Dumont, Kanal, G. Stefani
8.	"Magic's in the Makeup"	Dumont, G. Stefani
9.	"Running"	Kanal, G. Stefani
10.	"In My Head"	Dumont, Kanal, G. Stefani
11.	"New"	Dumont, G. Stefani
12.	"Simple Kind of Life"	G. Stefani
13.	"Just a Girl"	Dumont, G. Stefani
14.	"Hey Baby"	Dumont, Kanal, Rodney Price, G. Stefani
15.	"Rock Steady"	Kanal, G. Stefani
16.	"Spiderwebs"	Kanal, G. Stefani
17.	"Don't Speak"	E. Stefani, G. Stefani

Bonus tracks

No.	Title	Writer(s)	Length
18.	"Total Hate"	Gabriel Gonzalez, Chris Leal, John Spence
19.	"Excuse Me Mr."	Dumont, G. Stefani
20.	"Different People"	Kanal, E. Stefani, G. Stefani
21.	"Trapped in a Box"	Dumont, Kanal, E. Stefani, G. Stefani

=== Extra Features ===
1. Liam Lynch interview
2. Merkley Footage: Individual documentary pieces for each band member
3. Backstage Footage
4. Anaheim Key to the City
5. Hidden Footage

== Personnel ==
- Gwen Stefani - lead vocals
- Tom Dumont - guitar, keyboards, backing vocals
- Tony Kanal - bass, keyboards, backing vocals
- Adrian Young - drums, percussion
- Gabrial McNair - keyboards, trombone, backing vocals, percussion
- Stephen Bradley - keyboards, trumpet, backing vocals, percussion

== Certifications ==
Region	Certification	Certified units/sales
United States (RIAA)	Gold	50,000^{^}
^{^} Shipments figures based on certification alone.
