= Spiderwebs (song) =

1996 single by No Doubt

- Cover art for UK CD single

Single by No Doubt

from the album Tragic Kingdom
- Released: September 9, 1996
- Genre: Ska punk; pop-punk; alternative rock; reggae
- Length: 4:28; 3:50 (radio edit)
- Label: Interscope; Trauma
- Songwriters: Gwen Stefani; Tony Kanal
- Producer: Matthew Wilder

No Doubt singles chronology
"Just a Girl" (1995)	"Spiderwebs" (1996)	"Don't Speak" (1996)

Music video
- "Spiderwebs" on YouTube

"Spiderwebs" is a song by American band No Doubt from their third studio album, Tragic Kingdom (1995). It was written by Gwen Stefani and Tony Kanal, produced by Matthew Wilder, and released as a single in 1996. "Spiderwebs" appears on their 2003 greatest hits album, The Singles 1992–2003. Stefani was inspired to write the song after an admirer recited bad poetry to her. "Spiderwebs" is a ska punk song with angsty lyrics responding to Stefani's potential suitors.

"Spiderwebs" received positive reviews from contemporary as well as past critics, who frequently called it as one of the defining songs for No Doubt. "Spiderwebs" was not released as a commercial single in the United States, therefore making it ineligible to enter the Billboard Hot 100 chart at the time of its release. However, it reached number 18 on the Hot 100 Airplay chart. The song failed to attain top-ten positions but charted within the top 40 in Canada, New Zealand, Sweden, and the United Kingdom.

The music video for "Spiderwebs" was directed by Marcus Nispel and released on April 17, 1996. It features No Doubt performing the song at a wedding reception with Japanese attendees. Following the bouquet toss, the party is disrupted by a large number of wireline telephones that fly into the room and begin trapping the partygoers. Stefani drew comparisons to Madonna for designing her own wardrobe in the clip. No Doubt, and Stefani individually, has performed the song in a number of live appearances, including during the group's 1995–97 Tragic Kingdom World Tour, at the 39th Annual Grammy Awards in 1997, and at Stefani's 2018–20 Las Vegas Just a Girl concert residency.

== Background and release ==
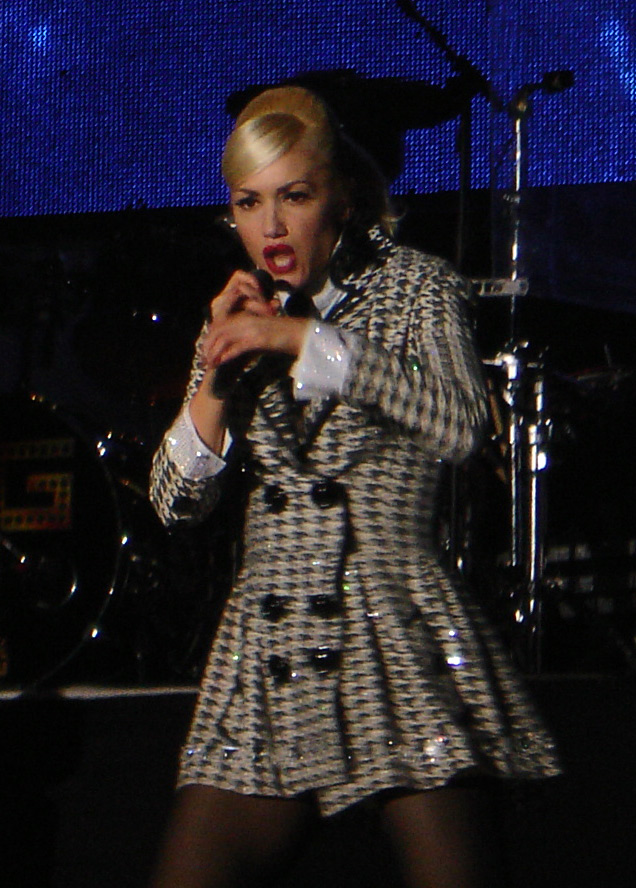
Gwen Stefani was inspired to write "Spiderwebs" after an admirer had attempted to woo her with poetry.

"Spiderwebs" was written by Gwen Stefani and Tony Kanal. The majority of the songs on Tragic Kingdom, including "Spiderwebs", did not receive co-writing credits from Eric Stefani, which was unusual for No Doubt as Eric had written most of the group's songs prior to his departure due to creative differences in early 1995. Due to this, the remaining band members took up songwriting, which made the songs they created more intimate and personal. "Spiderwebs" was developed differently in comparison to previous single "Just a Girl". "Just a Girl" was initially created by Gwen Stefani and Tom Dumont on a tape recorder, which was habitual for the group; Stefani and Dumont or Stefani and Kanal would work together on a recorder towards the beginning of production. However, for "Spiderwebs", Kanal collaborated with Dumont and asked him to learn the track and develop guitar parts to what Kanal and Stefani had initiated.

The entire group was highly satisfied with how "Spiderwebs" turned out. Dumont remarked: "I just remember taking that cassette tape home, and it was just Tony on bass and then Gwen singing in the bedroom, and I was like, ‘Oh my god this song is really good.’ You get that feeling like ‘This is a great song. How’d they write this?’." The original version of "Spiderwebs" contrasted majorly with what was released and included on Tragic Kingdom. Drummer Adrian Young said: "When we were first working on it, before we went in the studio, it was way slower. It was almost kind of like a funky groove song because it was so much slower."

No commercial editions were distributed in the United States; however, a promotional CD single was created and sent to radio stations in that country. The Australian CD maxi single featured the album and live versions of "Spiderwebs", the music video for "Just a Girl", and a cover of Bad Brains's "Sailin' On", written by Darryl Jenifer and Dr. Know. A two-part CD single series released in the United Kingdom in 1997 includes No Doubt (1992) track "Let's Get Back", The Beacon Street Collection (1995) track "Doghouse", a live version of Tragic Kingdom track "The Climb", the music videos to both "Spiderwebs" and "Excuse Me Mr.", and their cover of Sublime's "D.J.'s".

== Music and lyrics ==
According to Diffuser.fm's Brendan Manley, the song is a blend of "'80s new wave and West Coast pop-punk". It incorporates "swooning horns" and reggae rhythms, taking influence from Jamaican music. Rolling Stone's Brittany Spanos described "Spiderwebs" as the "dark [and] reggae-infused opener" to Tragic Kingdom. Kenneth Partridge from The A.V. Club compared "Spiderwebs" and previous single "Just a Girl" to the material on No Doubt's previous albums (No Doubt and The Beacon Street Collection), stating that "neither was a huge stylistic departure". Mike Boehm from the Los Angeles Times disagreed, stating that "Spiderwebs" is an example of "the band's improved craft". He also wrote that it correlates well to the lyrical themes of Tragic Kingdom, in which "No Doubt depicts flawed people and relationships breaking under the test of stress". In a modern review of Tragic Kingdom, Nick Levine from Noisey wrote that "'Spiderwebs' is essentially Destiny Child's 'Bug a Boo' for the pre-cellphone era".

According to Musicnotes.com, "Spiderwebs" is set in common time and has a moderately fast tempo of 138 beats per minute. The key of the song is in B♭ major with Stefani's vocal range spanning from F_{3} to C_{5} in scientific pitch notation. The song has a chord progression of B♭–F–Gm–E♭ in the verses and in the chorus. The bridge to "Spiderwebs" was described as having a "hypnotizing" effect on the listener, contrasting with the "booming [and] punchy" outro that succeeds it.

According to the liner notes for No Doubt's 2003 greatest hits album, The Singles 1992–2003, Stefani was inspired to write "Spiderwebs" after a lonesome admirer of hers had stood outside her window reading poetry for her attention. In effort to ignore the attempts of the pursuer, Stefani sings about constantly having to screen her phone calls. Entertainment Weekly's David Browne said that with "Spiderwebs" and Tragic Kingdom album track "End It on This", the lyrics have Stefani "acknowledg[ing her] obsessions with losers and decides to break free" from them. During the song's refrain, Stefani sings with a "semi angry scowl": "Sorry I'm not home right now / I'm walking into spiderwebs / So leave a message and I'll call you back."

== Critical reception ==
In addition to several other tracks from Tragic Kingdom, Noisey's Nick Levine praised "Spiderwebs" for having a chorus "that will bounce round [sic] your brain for days". Tom Breihan from Stereogum praised No Doubt for managing to get radio stations to select "Spiderwebs" for airplay, writing: "kids like me still wound up thinking it was cool that ska was getting onto the radio." He also claimed that the song's "central melody [...] will get stuck in your head for days and days".

In honor of the 20th anniversary of Tragic Kingdom, a group of critics from The A.V. Club reanalyzed the album and its songs. Alex McCown felt that No Doubt "found a musical sweet spot" with "Spiderwebs", calling it one of the catchiest songs on the album. Kenneth Partridge, from the same publication, acclaimed Stefani's "beautiful and slender voice" in the track. He also stated that the lyrics of the song made it "hard to call the nineties anything else but classic". In a 2016 readers' poll compiled by Rolling Stone magazine, "Spiderwebs" was voted as Stefani's fifth-best song of all time.

== Chart performance ==
In the U.S., "Spiderwebs" was not released as a commercial single, and therefore was ineligible to enter the Billboard Hot 100 chart. However, as an album cut, and later as a promotional CD single, it received heavy airplay on alternative and mainstream pop radio stations, resulting in appearances in several other Billboard charts. On Billboard's Modern Rock Tracks chart, "Spiderwebs" peaked at number five, becoming their second of five entries within the top ten and second consecutive entry from Tragic Kingdom, after "Just a Girl" which peaked at number 10. It also reached number 11 on the Top 40/Mainstream chart, surpassing "Just a Girl"'s peak of number 24. On the Hot 100 Airplay chart, a major component chart of the Billboard Hot 100, the song was ranked at number 18. In March 2021, the Recording Industry Association of America certified "Spiderwebs" platinum for combined sales and streaming figures of 1,000,000 units.

"Spiderwebs" marked No Doubt's first charting entry on Canada's RPM 100 Hit Tracks chart. During the week ending September 16, 1996, the song debuted at number 76, becoming the week's highest new entry. On the issue dated November 25, 1996, the song reached a peak of number 11 on the Top Singles Chart, during its eleventh consecutive week on the chart. In total, "Spiderwebs" spent 18 consecutive weeks on Canada's RPM chart. "Spiderwebs" also entered the Top Rock/Alternative Tracks chart, peaking at number eight, improving on the number 25 position that "Just a Girl" earned in May 1996.

In the United Kingdom, "Spiderwebs" debuted at number 16 on the issue dated October 4, 1997. It dropped to number 33 the following week and departed two weeks later. "Spiderwebs" was the fourth consecutive top 40 entry from Tragic Kingdom to appear on the Official Singles Chart, succeeding "Don't Speak" and the original and reissued versions of "Just a Girl". According to the Official Charts Company, "Spiderwebs" is No Doubt's sixth-biggest song and Gwen Stefani's 14th-biggest selling combined. Elsewhere in Europe, "Spiderwebs" reached lower positions on record charts. Although it peaked within the top 40 of the charts in Scotland and Sweden, it only reached number 84 in the Netherlands on the Single Top 100 chart.

== Music video ==
Stefani drew comparisons to Madonna for designing her own wardrobe in the "Spiderwebs" video.

The accompanying music video for "Spiderwebs" was directed by film director and producer Marcus Nispel. The video opens with a newlywed couple engaging with the attendants of their wedding reception. No Doubt occupies a stage within the same room and begins performing "Spiderwebs" to the largely Japanese crowd. The music captures the attention of the partygoers who are preparing to participate in the bouquet toss. The bride throws her bouquet of flowers and Stefani catches it, but she pricks her finger on a thorn in the process. As a result, the video cuts to a black-and-white sequence where wireline telephones knock down the large windows in the room and begin wrapping around No Doubt and the wedding patrons and trapping them. An unexpected gust of wind travels throughout the room and disturbing the party. The band members eventually free themselves from the entanglement and then finish performing. The video ends with No Doubt departing the party and exiting through an alley behind the building.

Much like her attire in the previous music video for "Just a Girl", Stefani received attention for her outfit. In the video, she wore a white tank top, tartan pants, and a wallet attached to her pants with a chain. Much's Allison Bowsher analyzed her appearance: "Combining elements of femininity and masculinity in her look and performance, Stefani was unabashedly original." Stefani drew comparisons to Madonna for designing her own wardrobe for the video. The video was distributed for broadcast on several music-related television networks, such as MTV, on April 17, 1996. It was also featured on MTV's Buzz Bin TV series, which plays music videos from up and coming music groups. In 2004, the video was featured on No Doubt's compilation The Videos 1992–2003.

== Live performances ==
Stefani performing "Spiderwebs" solo during the Just a Girl concert residency in 2019.

On September 5, 1996, No Doubt returned as the musical guests on Late Night with David Letterman and performed "Spiderwebs". It was the second time the group appeared on the show within the same year, previously performing "Just a Girl" during the March 28th episode; the band remarked that a "mutual admiration [had been] established" between No Doubt and David Letterman. "Spiderwebs" was performed as the fifteenth song of their 1995–97 Tragic Kingdom World Tour. The performance of the song at the July 1, 1997 show in Anaheim, at The Arrowhead Pond, was recorded and released in No Doubt's first live album, Live in the Tragic Kingdom (1997). No Doubt also performed "Spiderwebs" at the 39th Annual Grammy Awards in 1997. During the rendition, Stefani wore a black-and-white crop top and black pants. At the ceremony, the group also received their first two Grammy nominations, in the Best New Artist and Best Rock Album categories.

For the 2002 Rock Steady Tour, "Spiderwebs" was performed during the concert's final segment, in between singing "Rock Steady" and "Don't Speak". The performance of "Spiderwebs" at the November 22–23 and 29, 2002 shows in Long Beach at the Long Beach Convention and Entertainment Center were recorded and featured on the group's second live album, Rock Steady Live (2003). In April 2018, Stefani announced her Just a Girl concert residency at the Planet Hollywood Resort Las Vegas. During the dates of the show, Stefani performed "Spiderwebs" as the concert's fifth song. For the performance, the stage is set up as a house party and decorated with speakers and neon-colored objects. Stefani's look during the promotional campaign for the concert series mimics her looks from the music video for "Spiderwebs"; she wears a tank top stylized with her name in black, sports red lipstick, and her signature platinum blonde hair. No Doubt performed "Spiderwebs" on January 30, 2025 at Kia Forum in Inglewood, California for FireAid to help with relief efforts for the January 2025 Southern California wildfires.

== Cover versions and usage ==
Four Year Strong recorded a cover of "Spiderwebs" for their second studio album, Explains It All (2009). Their rendition features an interpolation of Pantera's 1992 single "This Love" towards the end. "Spiderwebs" appears as a playable track in the video games Guitar Hero World Tour and Guitar Hero: On Tour, and was released as downloadable content for Rocksmith 2014 as well as the Rock Band video game series. It was also included on the soundtrack to the American video game NBA 2K15. At the June 6, 2015 show of Kenny Chesney's The Big Revival Tour, supporting artist Miranda Lambert performed a surprise cover of "Spiderwebs". Lambert wore a tank top displaying "I Love Joe's on Weed" in a black font and jorts. Chris Parton from Taste of Country enjoyed her cover, writing: "her regular show might come off a little more refined, but nothing can compare to the simple fun of cover songs in a cramped bar full of rowdy fans." In October 2020, Stefani performed a "countrified version" of "Spiderwebs" as part of a skit on The Tonight Show Starring Jimmy Fallon where Fallon portrayed the character Buck Pinto promoting a fictitious album Gwen's Gone Country.

== Track listings and formats ==
Australia CD maxi-single

1. "Spiderwebs" (LP version) – 4:27
2. "Spiderwebs" (live from KROQ) –
3. "Sailin' On" – 3:36
4. "Just a Girl" (music video) – 3:27

Sweden CD single

1. "Spiderwebs" (LP version) – 4:27
2. "Sailin' On" – 3:36

UK CD single (Part 1)

1. "Spiderwebs" (LP version) – 4:28
2. "The Climb" (live) – 7:54
3. "Doghouse" – 4:26
4. "Spiderwebs" (music video) – 4:08

UK CD single (Part 2)

1. "Spiderwebs" (LP version) – 4:28
2. "D.J.'s" (live) – 4:10
3. "Let's Get Back" – 4:13
4. "Excuse Me Mr." (music video) – 3:30

== Credits and personnel ==
Credits are adapted from the liner notes of Tragic Kingdom.

- Gwen Stefani – writer, vocals
- Tony Kanal – writer, bass
- Matthew Wilder – producer
- Adrian Young – drums, percussion
- Tom Dumont – guitar
- Eric Stefani – keyboards, piano
- Stephen Perkins – steel drums
- Phil Jordan – trumpet
- Robert Vosgien – mastering
- David Holman – mixing
- Paul Palmer – mixing
- Phil Kaffel – recording
- George Landress – recording

== Charts ==
=== Weekly charts ===
Weekly chart performance for "Spiderwebs"
Chart (1996–1997)	Peak position
Australia (ARIA)	46
Canada Top Singles (RPM)	11
Canada Rock/Alternative (RPM)	8
Europe (Eurochart Hot 100)	80
Iceland (Íslenski Listinn Topp 40)	18
Netherlands (Dutch Top 40 Tipparade)	16
Netherlands (Single Top 100)	85
New Zealand (Recorded Music NZ)	30
Scottish Singles Sales (Official Charts)	15
Sweden (Sverigetopplistan)	23
UK Singles (Official Charts)	16
US Adult Pop Airplay (Billboard)	29
US Alternative Airplay (Billboard)	5
US Pop Airplay (Billboard)	11
US Radio Songs (Billboard)	18

=== Year-end charts ===
Year-end chart performance for "Spiderwebs"
Chart (1996)	Position
Canada Top Singles (RPM)	100
US Modern Rock Tracks (Billboard)	7

Year-end chart performance for "Spiderwebs"
Chart (1997)	Position
US Top 40/Mainstream (Billboard)	99

== Certifications ==
Certifications for "Spiderwebs"
Region	Certification	Certified units/sales
United States (RIAA)	Platinum	1,000,000^{‡}
^{‡} Sales+streaming figures based on certification alone.

== Release history ==
Release dates and formats for "Spiderwebs"
Region	Date	Format	Label(s)	Ref.
Australia	September 9, 1996	CD maxi-single	Trauma	
United States	1996	Promo CD	Interscope; Trauma	
Japan	September 28, 1996	CD	Interscope; MCA	
Europe	1997	Promo CD	Interscope; Trauma	
Sweden	1997	CD	Interscope; Trauma	
United Kingdom	September 22, 1997	CD (Part 1)	Interscope; Trauma	
United Kingdom	September 22, 1997	CD (Part 2)	Interscope; Trauma	
United Kingdom	September 22, 1997	Cassette	Interscope; Trauma	
