= Happy Now? (No Doubt song) =

1997 single by No Doubt

Single by No Doubt

from the album Tragic Kingdom
- Released: September 23, 1997
- Recorded: 1995
- Genre: Power pop; ska punk
- Length: 3:43
- Label: Interscope; Trauma
- Songwriter(s): Gwen Stefani; Tom Dumont; Tony Kanal
- Producer(s): Matthew Wilder

No Doubt singles chronology
"Excuse Me Mr." (1997)	"Happy Now?" (1997)	"Hey You!" (1998)

Audio video
- "Happy Now?" on YouTube

"Happy Now?" is a song by American band No Doubt for their third studio album, Tragic Kingdom (1995). It was written by Gwen Stefani, Tom Dumont, and Tony Kanal, produced by Matthew Wilder, and released as the record's sixth single overall on September 23, 1997. The commercial CD singles were distributed exclusively in Australia and Europe. However, the song was still released to radio stations in the United States. Musically, "Happy Now?" is a power pop, ska punk, and rock song with and lyrics detailing a painful breakup, specifically the former relationship between Stefani and Kanal. Despite not receiving a formal release in the United States nor filming a proper music video, "Happy Now?" received heavy rotation on Californian radio stations, such as KROQ.

Critically, the single received a positive reception from music reviewers. Critics called the track emotional and strong, and considered it a strong single despite its failure to reach the commercial success of prior singles from Tragic Kingdom. Commercially, "Happy Now?" reached a lower position on Australia's ARIA Top Singles Chart in October 1997. It has been performed by No Doubt at a number of live appearances, including during their 1995–97 Tragic Kingdom World Tour and at their nationwide Return of Saturn Tour in 2000.

== Background and release ==
"Happy Now?" was written by No Doubt band members Gwen Stefani, Tom Dumont, and Tony Kanal. It was produced by American singer-songwriter Matthew Wilder, whose presence as an outsider upset former member and Gwen's brother, Eric Stefani, so he departed the group due to creative differences in early 1995. Because of Eric's departure, the remaining band members were tasked with writing their own lyrics, something that had been somewhat foreign to them. However, Gwen saw this opportunity as a creative outlet to express her feelings towards breaking up with Kanal; she began writing intense breakup songs, such as "Sunday Morning" and "Happy Now?".

According to Dumont, "Happy Now?" was never released as a commercial single in the United States due to the continuous success of the album's previous five singles; however, it was distributed to radio stations for airplay in order to minimize the lag created by these songs. Unlike their previous singles, an official music video was never made for the single either. Nonetheless, Kanal attributed the radio airplay success of "Happy Now?" due to Californian radio station KROQ's decision to continually play it.

"Happy Now?" was first released as a commercial CD single on September 23, 1997. For the release, the commercial CDs were only distributed in Australia and Europe; none of the CDs were released in the United States. In Europe, the CD single was released with bonus track "Oi to the World", a cover of The Vandals's song of the same name. The Australian CD maxi-single includes No Doubt (1992) track "Let's Get Back" and their live cover of Sublime's Christmas song, "D.J.'s".

== Composition and lyrics ==
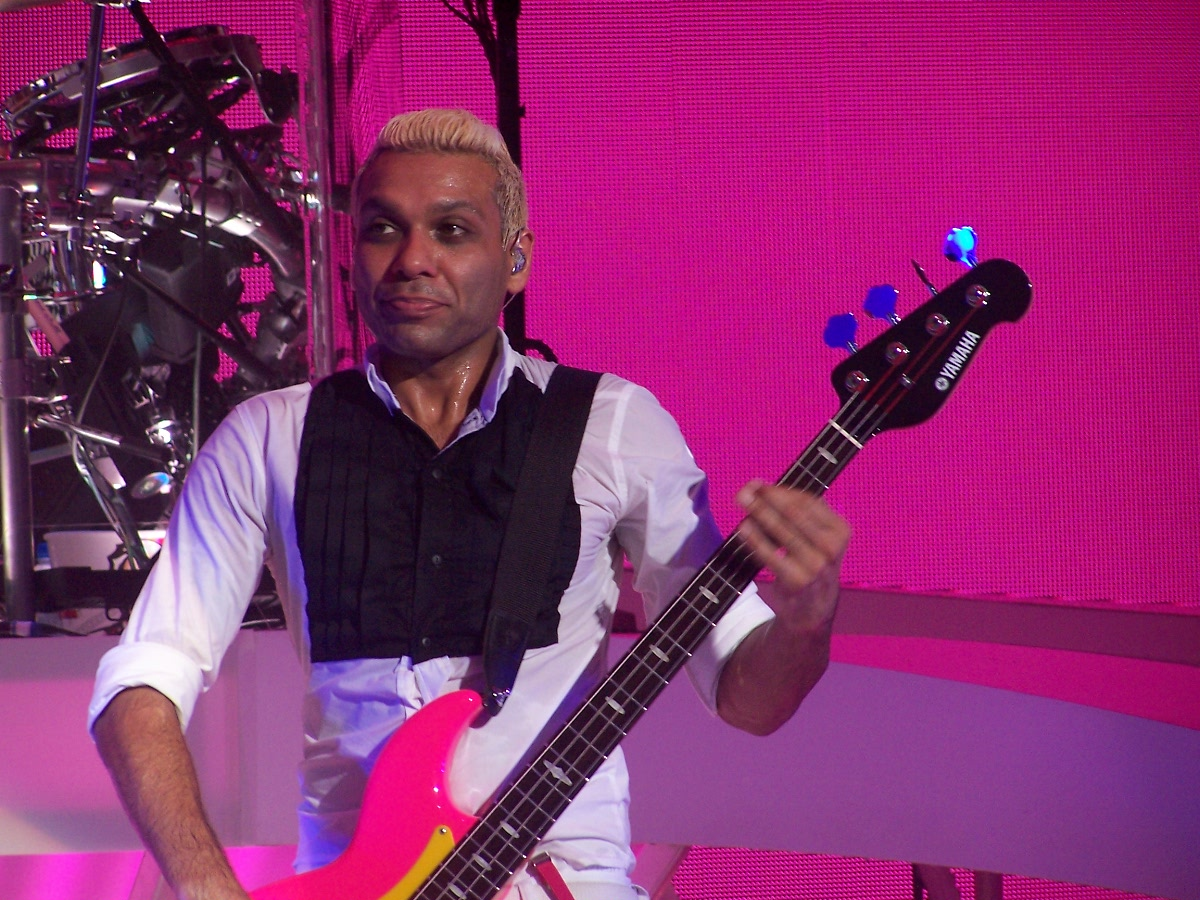
Tony Kanal is the subject matter of "Happy Now?", who dated Gwen Stefani for seven years prior to recording Tragic Kingdom.

Musically, "Happy Now?" is a power pop, ska punk, and rock song. Mike Boehm from the Los Angeles Times felt that "Happy Now?" could serve as a solid example of "the band's improved craft". He also wrote that it correlates well to the lyrical themes of Tragic Kingdom, in which "No Doubt depicts flawed people and relationships breaking under the test of stress". According to Musicnotes.com, "Happy Now?" is set in common time and has a forcefully fast tempo of 158 beats per minute. The key of the song is in C minor with Stefani's vocal range spanning nearly an octave and a half, from F_{3} to E♭_{5} in scientific pitch notation. The song progresses in the following chord progressions of Cm–B♭–A♭ in the intro and Am-Dm–F in the verses.

As described by Kanal, "Happy Now?" is a "very intense break up song". In the lyrics, Stefani describes this painful breakup as a direct message to her former lover – which in this case, is Kanal. Stefani announced how "proud" she had felt after completing for "Happy Now?" as it served as "one of the most direct and pointed songs" on Tragic Kingdom. The lyrics detail the storyline of their relationship: "boy dumps girl, girl announces that she likes her newfound liberation and taunts him, 'Are you happy now?'." She also sings lines such as: "No more leaning on your shoulder / I won't be there, no more bother".

== Reception ==
MTV News's Diblasi was impressed by the track, and listed it as the second best "breakup song" on the parent album, only behind the album's third single, "Don't Speak". She also found the track to be emotive and one of the "most gut-wrenching tracks" on Tragic Kingdom due to its ability to help someone "survive a breakup". In addition to several other tracks from Tragic Kingdom, Noisey's Nick Levine praised "Happy Now?" for having a chorus "that will bounce round [sic] your brain for days". Kenneth Partridge, writing for The A.V. Club, appreciated the strength of the song, mentioning that although "Happy Now?" was not able to "chart as high" when compared to the album's previous singles, "the damage was done".

In honor of the 20th anniversary of the album, a panel of critics from The A.V. Club reanalyzed Tragic Kingdom. Columnist Annie Zaleski admired the track in addition to "Excuse Me Mr." and "Sunday Morning"; she noted that all three of them "have just the right amount of pep". In addition, Marah Eakin described "Happy Now?" as a banger that "aged well" despite being released so long ago. Alex McLevy from the same publication stated that with "Spiderwebs" and "Happy Now?", No Doubt had "found a musical sweet spot".

"Happy Now?" charted within the lower positions of the charts in Australia in 1997. On the ARIA Top Singles Chart, it debuted at number 293 on October 13 and peaked at number 132, two weeks later. According to the Australian Recording Industry Association, it spent a total of 11 weeks charting in that territory.

== Live performances ==
"Excuse Me Mr." was performed as the fourth song of No Doubt's 1995–97 Tragic Kingdom World Tour. The performance of the song at the July 1, 1997 show in Anaheim, at The Arrowhead Pond, was recorded and released in No Doubt's first live album, Live in the Tragic Kingdom (1997). "Happy Now?" was selected for inclusion during No Doubt's national Return of Saturn Tour in 2000. Several of the songs performed during the concert tour featured Stefani singing about marriage and romance, but when No Doubt returned with songs from Tragic Kingdom, like "Happy Now?" and "Excuse Me Mr.", Greg Kot from Rolling Stone found the audience to be more engaged. Kanal and Stefani "bounc[ed]" around the stage during the performance and Kot compared Stefani's vocals to a cross between cartoon character Betty Boop and American performer Lydia Lunch.

== Track listings and formats ==
CD maxi single

- 1. "Happy Now?" (LP Version) – 3:43
- 2. "Let's Get Back" (LP Version) – 4:12
- 3. "D.J.'s" (Live) – 4:10

CD single/promotional CD single

- 1. "Happy Now?" – 3:43
- 2. "Oi to the World" – 2:15

== Credits and personnel ==
Obtained from the liner notes of Tragic Kingdom.

- Bass – Tony Kanal
- Drums, percussion – Adrian Young
- Guitar – Tom Dumont
- Mastering – Robert Vosgien
- Mixing – David Holman, Paul Palmer
- Piano, keyboards – Eric Stefani
- Producer – Matthew Wilder
- Recording – George Landress, Phil Kaffel
- Trumpet – Phil Jordan
- Writers – Gwen Stefani, Tom Dumont, Tony Kanal

== Charts ==
Chart performance for "Happy Now?"
Chart (1997)	Peak position
Australia (ARIA)	132

== Release history ==
Release dates and formats for "Happy Now?"
Region	Date	Format	Label(s)	Ref.
Australia	September 23, 1997	CD maxi single	Interscope; Trauma	
Europe	September 23, 1997	CD single	Interscope	
Europe	1997	Promotional CD single	Interscope; Trauma; Universal Music Group	
