= Live in the Tragic Kingdom =

Video by No Doubt
- Released: November 11, 1997
- Recorded: May 31 – June 1, 1997
- Venue: The Arrowhead Pond of Anaheim (Anaheim, California)
- Genre: Ska punk; alternative rock
- Length: 92 minutes
- Label: Interscope
- Director: Sophie Muller
- Producer: No Doubt

No Doubt chronology
Live in the Tragic Kingdom (1997)	Rock Steady Live (2003)

Live in the Tragic Kingdom is a video album by American rock band No Doubt. It was released on VHS on November 11, 1997, by Interscope Records, and consists of a filmed concert at The Arrowhead Pond of Anaheim in Anaheim, California, on May 31, and June 1, 1997, as part of the Tragic Kingdom World Tour. It was later released on DVD on November 25, 2003, as part of No Doubt's box set album Boom Box, and as a stand-alone DVD on June 13, 2006. A LaserDisc version was also released in Hong Kong.

== Background ==
No Doubt released their eponymous debut studio album in 1992, one year after being signed to Interscope Records. The album was commercially unsuccessful, selling 30,000 copies. Interscope did not trust that the band would fund a second album, and paired them with producer Matthew Wilder. Keyboardist Eric Stefani was distressed by the band's lack of success, and the fact that he had to give up creative control to someone outside the band; he soon left the band in late 1994 to pursue an animation career on the animated sitcom The Simpsons. No Doubt released and recorded their second studio album, The Beacon Street Collection, independently. Despite its limited availability, it sold over 100,000 copies within a year of its release, and convinced Interscope that they would fund a successful third album.

No Doubt's third studio album, Tragic Kingdom, was released on October 10, 1995, and spawned seven singles, including "Just a Girl", "Spiderwebs", "Excuse Me Mr.", "Sunday Morning", and "Don't Speak", the latter of which reached number one on the Billboard Hot 100 Airplay for 16 weeks, a record at the time which was later broken by the Goo Goo Dolls' "Iris". The album sold 16 million copies worldwide. Because of the success of Tragic Kingdom, No Doubt decided to embark on a tour in support of the album.

== Tour ==
No Doubt embarked on the Tragic Kingdom World Tour, beginning in 1995, shortly after the release of Tragic Kingdom. They expected to tour for two months, but the tour ended up lasting two and a half years.

The band chose Project X, headed by Luc Lafortune and Michael Keeling, to design the stage for the series of concerts. The band suggested decorating the stage like a clearing in a forest. Project X created three anthropomorphic trees with glowing oranges, as a reference to the music video of "Don't Speak". The show included clear and mylar confetti designed to look like rain. Lighting design was difficult because there were only four rehearsals, so the show was arranged to be flexible to allow for what Lafortune referred to as "a very kinetic performance."

== Bonus material ==
Several "extras" and easter eggs were included on the 2006 DVD release of Live in the Tragic Kingdom, including a three-song video clip of a concert in The Hague, the Netherlands, during the Tragic Kingdom World Tour, an alternative version of "Don't Speak", a photo gallery, and trailers for No Doubt's two previous DVD releases, The Videos 1992–2003 and Rock Steady Live.

== Critical reception ==
Because Live in the Tragic Kingdom was not one of No Doubt's studio albums, it lacked much attention from critics. However, Tracie Cooper of AllMovie enjoyed the mix of songs between fan favorites, lesser-known songs, and covers. A Rotten Tomatoes review noted lead singer Gwen Stefani's "danc[ing], bounc[ing], and sing[ing] ... to the infectious pop-punk-ska of her bandmates" and said "it's impossible not to feel like dancing (or smiling, at least)."

== Track listing ==
No.	Title	Length
1.	"Tragic Kingdom"
2.	"Excuse Me Mr."
3.	"Different People"
4.	"Happy Now?"
5.	"D.J.'s" (Sublime cover)
6.	"End It on This"
7.	"Just a Girl"
8.	"The Climb"
9.	"Total Hate"
10.	"Hey You"
11.	"The Imperial March" (from The Empire Strikes Back)
12.	"Move On / Ghost Town" (The Specials cover)
13.	"Don't Speak"
14.	"Sunday Morning"
15.	"Spiderwebs"
16.	"Ob-La-Di, Ob-La-Da" (The Beatles cover)

== Personnel ==
- Gwen Stefani - lead vocals
- Tom Dumont - guitar, backing vocals (9); acoustic guitar (10)
- Tony Kanal - bass, backing vocals (9, 14); acoustic bass (10)
- Adrian Young - drums, percussion
- Gabrial McNair - trombone, keyboard, backing vocals
- Stephen Bradley - trumpet, backing vocals
- Various guest (16) - some of these guest including members of the bands Goldfinger, The Vandals, and various others. Another notable guest was Eric Stefani, Gwen Stefani's brother and a founding member of the band who served as their keyboardist until Tragic Kingdom.

== Charts ==
Chart (1997)	Peak position
US Top Music Videos (Billboard)	5
