= Tragic Kingdom =

Studio album by No Doubt
- Released: October 10, 1995
- Recorded: March 1993 – October 1995
- Studios: Total Access (Redondo Beach); The Record Plant (Hollywood); Santa Monica Sound (Santa Monica); NRG (Los Angeles); Rumbo Recorders (Los Angeles); Mars (Burbank); Studio 4 (Santa Monica); Grandmaster (Hollywood); Clear Lake Audio (North Hollywood); Red Zone (Burbank); North Vine (Hollywood)
- Genres: Pop rock; alternative rock; ska punk; new wave; pop-punk
- Length: 59:35
- Labels: Trauma; Interscope
- Producer: Matthew Wilder

No Doubt chronology
The Beacon Street Collection (1995)	Tragic Kingdom (1995)	Return of Saturn (2000)

Singles from Tragic Kingdom
- 1. "Just a Girl" Released: September 21, 1995; 2. "Spiderwebs" Released: September 9, 1996; 3. "Don't Speak" Released: November 8, 1996; 4. "Sunday Morning" Released: May 27, 1997; 5. "Excuse Me Mr." Released: June 21, 1997; 6. "Happy Now?" Released: September 23, 1997; 7. "Hey You!" Released: February 23, 1998

Tragic Kingdom is the third studio album by the American rock band No Doubt, released on October 10, 1995, by Trauma Records and Interscope Records. It was the final album to feature original keyboardist Eric Stefani, who left the band in 1994. The album was produced by Matthew Wilder and recorded in 11 studios in the Greater Los Angeles area between March 1993 and October 1995. Between 1995 and 1998, the album spawned seven singles, including "Just a Girl", which charted on the Billboard Hot 100 and the UK Singles Chart, and "Don't Speak", which topped the Billboard Hot 100 Airplay and reached the top five of many international charts.

The album received mostly positive reviews from music critics and became the band's most commercially successful album, reaching number one on the Billboard 200 as well as topping the charts in Canada and New Zealand. At the 39th Annual Grammy Awards, No Doubt earned nominations for Best New Artist and Best Rock Album. The album has sold over 16 million copies worldwide, and was certified Diamond in the United States and Canada, Platinum in the United Kingdom, and quadruple Platinum in Australia. Tragic Kingdom helped facilitate the ska revival of the 1990s, increasing the visibility and commercial success of other ska bands. The album was ranked number 441 on Rolling Stone's 2003 list of the 500 greatest albums of all time.

No Doubt embarked on a tour to promote the album. It was designed by Project X and lasted two and a half years. An early 1997 performance at the Arrowhead Pond of Anaheim was filmed and released as Live in the Tragic Kingdom on VHS and later DVD.

== Background ==
No Doubt released their self-titled debut album in 1992, a year after being signed to Interscope. The album's pop-oriented sound contrasted with grunge music, which was popular in the United States when No Doubt was released. The album sold 30,000 copies; the program director of KROQ radio station, on which the band aspired to be played, said, "It would take an act of God for this band to get on the radio."

The band decided to produce their next album independently and recorded their second album, The Beacon Street Collection, in a homemade studio. No Doubt's first two singles were released for The Beacon Street Collection: "Squeal" and "Doghouse", under their own record label, Beacon Street Records. Despite limited availability, the album sold 100,000 copies in the year of its release. Their independence attracted Interscope's attention and ensured that the label would fund a third album.

The band began work on Tragic Kingdom in 1993, but Interscope rejected most of their material and paired the band with producer Matthew Wilder. Keyboardist Eric Stefani eventually stopped recording with the band because he disliked having to relinquish creative control. He encouraged other members of the band to write songs but sometimes felt threatened when they did. Eric became increasingly depressed, and in September 1994, he stopped attending rehearsals, though they were usually held at his house. Bassist Tony Kanal then ended his seven-year relationship with Gwen Stefani.

== Production ==
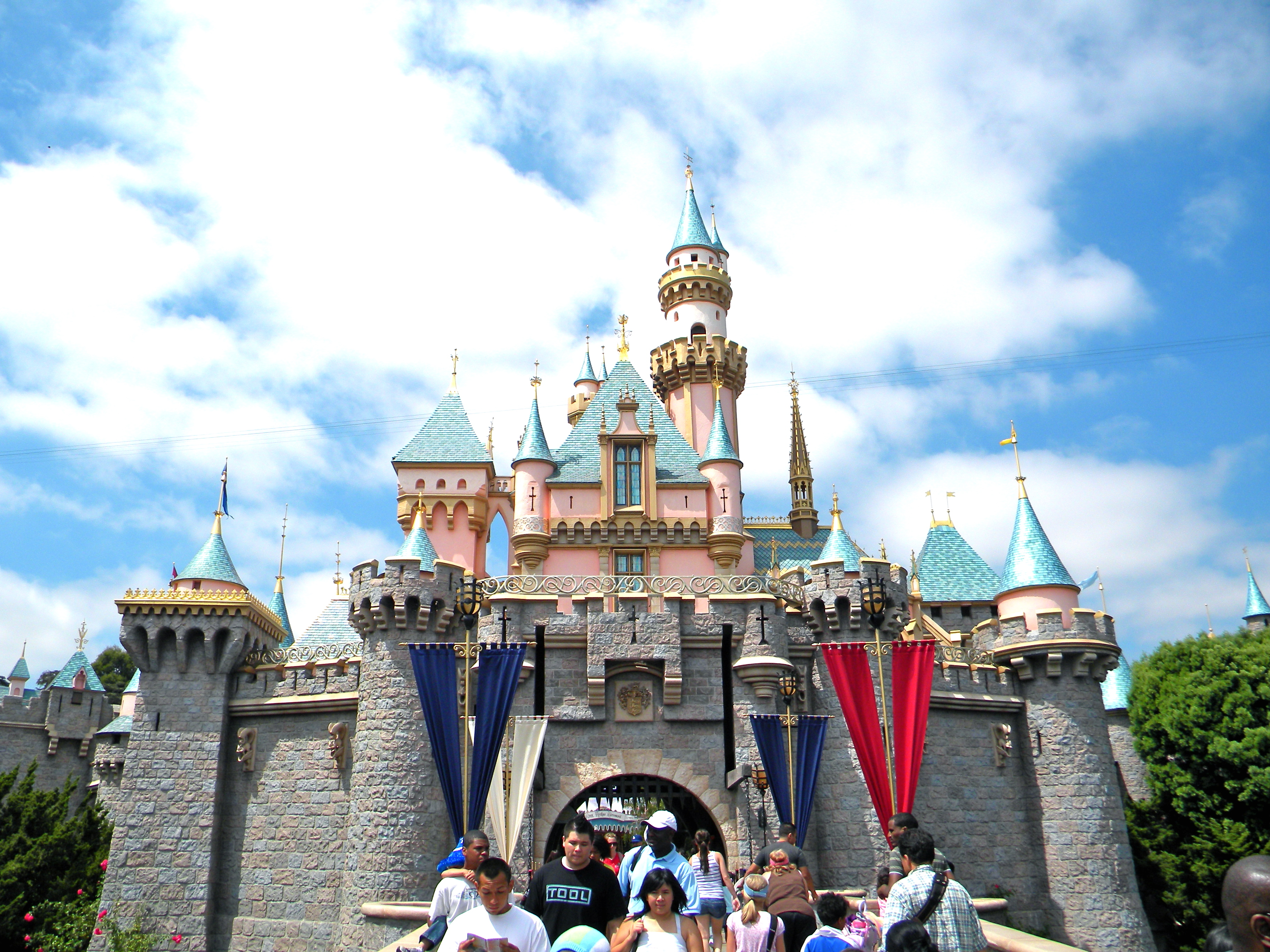
The title "Tragic Kingdom" is a play on words for Disneyland's nickname, The Magic Kingdom.

Tragic Kingdom was recorded in 11 studios in the Greater Los Angeles area, starting in March 1993 and released in October 1995. During one of these recording sessions, the band was introduced to Paul Palmer, who had previously worked with Bush and was interested in working on No Doubt's new album. After mixing the first single with David J. Holman, "Just a Girl", Palmer and Holman went on to do the same to the rest of the record. He wanted to release the album on his own label, Trauma Records, which was already associated with Interscope, and succeeded in getting the contract.

The album is named after guitarist Tom Dumont's seventh-grade teacher's nickname for Disneyland, which is in Anaheim, California, where the band members grew up. The album photography and portraits were taken by photographer fine artist Daniel Arsenault. Gwen is featured in the foreground while the rest of the band members are standing in an orange grove in the background. Gwen pushed for Eric to be included on the album cover—a source of tension for the band—reasoning that although he had left the band, he had still contributed substantially to the album. Eric is seen near the back of the picture, looking away from the camera. The pictures on the cover and in the liner notes were taken on city streets in their native Orange County (namely Anaheim and the City of Orange) and in orange groves. The red dress Gwen wears on the cover was loaned to the Hard Rock Cafe and was later displayed at the Fullerton Museum Center in an exhibit titled "The Orange Groove: Orange County's Rock n' Roll History". The dress, appraised as high as US$5,000, was stolen from the exhibit in January 2005.

== Music and lyrics ==
Tragic Kingdom has been described as pop rock, alternative rock, ska punk, new wave, and pop-punk. The album also uses elements of pop, funk, punk, dancehall, disco, third-wave ska, post-grunge, ska, reggae, flamenco, and Tejano, among others.

Many of the lyrics on Tragic Kingdom were written by lead vocalist Gwen Stefani and were about her experiences in life. Those from No Doubt and The Beacon Street Collection were written mainly by Eric Stefani, who left the band after Tragic Kingdom was finished. Therefore, the style of music changed from what the band had previously produced. Dumont explained the change in sound in an interview for Backstage Online:

Well, there is a reason that the sound of our music has changed, and it's not because we've sold out—easy for me to say. Eric, our keyboard player, used to write most of our songs. He was the main creative force in the band for many years. And at a certain point after that first album came out, he had this personal thing, like he didn't like touring, he didn't like all that stuff. He just liked to sit down and write songs. That's him. He's the artistic side, the total Mr. Creative...[w]ell what happened is when Eric decided to leave the band it left the song writing to us, me, Gwen, Tony, the rest of us and it's a really natural thing for our song writing style to be different than Eric's. Just we're different people. I mean we've learned a lot from him and he taught us a lot of things about song writing, but we write simpler music. We have a simpler style. We're not quite genius like him, I think. This album was our first attempt. It was Gwen's first time really writing all the lyrics herself, so to me, it went the opposite from selling out—we have done something that is even more personal. In the past, Eric was writing songs about his life and having Gwen sing them. Now we have Gwen singing and writing about her own experiences. It makes it more natural. She's a singer, she should sing about herself or sing what she wants to sing. I think that is the main reason why our musical style has changed.

== Singles ==
The first single released from Tragic Kingdom was "Just a Girl", which details Gwen Stefani's exasperation with female stereotypes and her father's concerned reaction to her driving home late from her boyfriend's house. It peaked at number 23 on the Billboard Hot 100 chart and number 10 on the Modern Rock Tracks chart. The song also charted on the UK Singles Chart, where its original release peaked at number 38 and its reissue at number three. The second single was "Spiderwebs", written about an uninterested woman who is trying to avoid the constant phone calls of a persistent man. It reached number five on the Billboard Modern Rock Tracks chart, number 11 on the Billboard Top 40 Mainstream chart, and number 16 on the UK Singles Chart, but not until it was released after Don't Speak hit number one.

The third single was "Don't Speak", a ballad about the breakup of Stefani and Kanal's relationship. It peaked at number one on the Billboard Hot 100 Airplay and maintained that position for 16 consecutive weeks, a record at the time, although it was broken in 1998 by the Goo Goo Dolls' "Iris" with 18 weeks. The song was not eligible to chart on the Billboard Hot 100 because no commercial single was released, which was a requirement at the time. The song also peaked at number two on the Modern Rock Tracks chart, at number six on the Adult Contemporary chart, at number one on the Adult Top 40 chart, and at number nine on the Rhythmic Top 40 chart. The song also appeared on several international charts, reaching number one in Australia, Belgium, the Netherlands, New Zealand, Norway, Sweden, Switzerland, and the United Kingdom; number two in Austria, Germany, and Spain; and number four in Finland and France.

"Excuse Me Mr." and "Sunday Morning" were released as the album's fourth and fifth singles, respectively. "Excuse Me Mr." reached number 17 on the Billboard Modern Rock Tracks chart and number 11 in New Zealand. "Sunday Morning" peaked at number 35 on the Billboard Top 40 Mainstream chart, number 21 in Australia, number 42 in New Zealand, and number 55 in Sweden. Composing the song began when Kanal was having a fight with Stefani, then his girlfriend, through the bathroom door of his parents' house in Yorba Linda, California. Stefani later changed the lyrics to discuss dealing with her breakup with Kanal. "Happy Now?" was released as the album's sixth single on September 23, 1997, but failed to chart anywhere. "Hey You!" was released as the seventh and final single from Tragic Kingdom; it peaked at number 51 on the Dutch Single Top 100. Despite being a Dutch-only single, a Sophie Muller-directed music video was filmed to promote the single.

== Release and promotion ==
Tragic Kingdom was first released by Trauma and Interscope on October 10, 1995. To promote the album, Trauma launched a street campaign that targeted high school students and the skateboarding community. No Doubt performed on the Warped Tour, which was sponsored by several skateboarding companies, and at several skateboarding festivals. The album entered the Billboard 200 on January 20, 1996, at No. 175 and did not enter the top 100 until February 3, 1996, when it jumped to number 89. Palmer attributed the jump to a Channel One News program that Stefani hosted in January 1996, which was broadcast in 12,000 classrooms, and the band's subsequent performance at a Blockbuster store in Fresno, California.

In May 1996, the band worked with HMV, MuchMusic, and the Universal Music Group to put on a global in-store promotion. The band performed and answered questions in MuchMusic's studios in Toronto, Ontario. The session was broadcast live to HMV stores worldwide and on a webcast so that fans could watch and ask the band questions through MuchMusic's VJs. Sales of Tragic Kingdom doubled the week after the event. The event's sponsors lobbied Guinness World Records to create a category for the largest virtual in-store promotion to recognize the event.

No Doubt embarked on the Tragic Kingdom Tour after the release of the album. It chose Project X, headed by Luc Lafortune and Michael Keeling, to design the stage. No Doubt suggested decorating the stage as a clearing in a forest. Project X created three anthropomorphic trees with glowing oranges. The show included clear and mylar confetti designed to look like rain. Lighting design was difficult because there were only four rehearsals, so the show was arranged to be flexible to allow for what Lafortune referred to as "a very kinetic performance". The band expected to tour for two months, but the tour ended up lasting two and a half years.

An early 1997 performance at the Arrowhead Pond of Anaheim was filmed and was released as Live in the Tragic Kingdom on VHS on November 11, 1997. It was re-released on November 25, 2003, on DVD as part of the box set Boom Box, which also contained The Singles 1992–2003, Everything in Time, and The Videos 1992–2003; and again on June 13, 2006, as a stand-alone DVD, containing bonus material of extra songs, a photo gallery, and an alternative version of "Don't Speak".

== Critical reception and legacy ==
Professional ratings
Review scores
Source	Rating
AllMusic	4.5/5 stars
Blender	3/5 stars
Entertainment Weekly	C+
Los Angeles Times	3/4 stars
Music Week	2/5
Pitchfork	7.8/10
Punknews.org	4/5 stars
The Rolling Stone Album Guide	3.5/5 stars
Sputnikmusic	4.0/5
The Village Voice	C+

Tragic Kingdom received generally positive reviews from critics. David Fricke of Rolling Stone was mostly enthused by the album, describing it as "ear candy with good beats, not just bludgeon-by-numbers guitars" and its music as "a spry, white-suburban take on ska and Blondieesque pop". He nonetheless singled out "Don't Speak" as "irritating swill" with "high-pitched rippling" from Gwen Stefani. Entertainment Weekly's David Browne was more critical, attributing the album's sales to Stefani's "leggy, bleached-blond calling card" and concluding that "sex still sells". Browne described the music as "a hefty chunk of new-wave party bounce and Chili Peppers-style white-boy funk, with dashes of reggae, squealing hair-metal guitar, disco, ska-band horns", and the band as sounding like "savvy, lounge-bred pros". Individual songs were singled out and commented on: "Just a Girl" was described as "a chirpy, ska-tinged bopper", "Don't Speak" as "an old-fangled power ballad", "Sixteen" as a "song of solidarity with misunderstood teenage girls", and "Spiderwebs" and "End It on This" as "[Stefani] acknowledg[ing] obsessions with losers and tr[ying] to break free".

Calling the album a marked improvement over "the diffuse, rambling songwriting of [No Doubt's] two previous CDs", Mike Boehm of the Los Angeles Times said that on Tragic Kingdom, "The band is bright, hard-hitting and kinetic, as sharp production captures the core, four-man instrumental team and adjunct horn section at their best". In a favorable review for The Village Voice, critic Chuck Eddy felt that although "[the album] turns pretentious ... No Doubt resurrects the exuberance new-wave guys lost when '80s indie labels and college radio conned them into settling for slam-pit fits and wallflower wallpaper". His Village Voice colleague Robert Christgau was less impressed, calling Stefani "hebephrenic" and the album "hyped up" and not "as songful as its fun-besotted partisans [claim]". In a retrospective review, AllMusic's Stephen Thomas Erlewine called it "pure fun" and described the music as something "between '90s punk, third-wave ska, and pop sensibility" and a mix of "new wave melodicism, post-grunge rock, and West Coast sunshine", noting the songs "Spiderwebs", "Just a Girl", and "Don't Speak" as having "positively ruled the airwaves". Yahoo! Music reviewer Bill Holdship referred to the album as a "phenomenon" containing "hit after hit", also highlighting "Spiderwebs" as "a terrific opener".

At the 1997 Grammy Awards, No Doubt was nominated for Best New Artist and Best Rock Album. In 2000, Tragic Kingdom was voted number 436 in Colin Larkin's All Time Top 1000 Albums, while in 2003, it was ranked number 441 on Rolling Stone's list of the 500 greatest albums of all time. NME included Tragic Kingdom on its 2020 list of "The best new wave albums ever".

== Commercial performance ==
After entering the Billboard 200 at number 175 in January 1996, Tragic Kingdom eventually reached number one in December 1996, with 229,000 copies sold, spending nine non-consecutive weeks atop the chart. It was listed second on the 1997 Billboard 200 year-end chart, behind the Spice Girls' Spice. On February 5, 1999, the Recording Industry Association of America (RIAA) certified the album diamond, and as of July 2012, it had sold 8,167,000 copies in the United States; it sold an additional 1.32 million copies through BMG Music Club. Tragic Kingdom topped the Canadian Albums Chart in December 1996, and it was certified diamond by the Canadian Recording Industry Association (CRIA) in August 1997. In Europe, the album topped the chart in Belgium, Finland, and Norway, while reaching the top five in Austria, Germany, the Netherlands, Sweden, Switzerland, and the United Kingdom, and the top 20 in France. By April 2004, the album had sold 16 million copies worldwide.

The commercial success of Tragic Kingdom prompted record labels to sign ska bands, and more independent labels released ska records and compilations. Save Ferris's guitarist and vocalist Brian Mashburn stated that No Doubt helped allow bands like his to receive attention from the mainstream.

== Track listing ==
All tracks produced by Matthew Wilder.

No.	Title	Writer(s)	Length
1.	"Spiderwebs"	Gwen Stefani; Tony Kanal	4:28
2.	"Excuse Me Mr."	G. Stefani; Tom Dumont	3:04
3.	"Just a Girl"	G. Stefani; Dumont	3:28
4.	"Happy Now?"	G. Stefani; Dumont; Kanal	3:43
5.	"Different People"	Eric Stefani; G. Stefani; Kanal	4:34
6.	"Hey You!"	G. Stefani; Kanal	3:34
7.	"The Climb"	E. Stefani	6:37
8.	"Sixteen"	G. Stefani; Kanal	3:21
9.	"Sunday Morning"	Kanal; G. Stefani; E. Stefani	4:33
10.	"Don't Speak"	E. Stefani; G. Stefani	4:23
11.	"You Can Do It"	G. Stefani; E. Stefani; Dumont; Kanal	4:13
12.	"World Go 'Round"	Kanal; G. Stefani	4:09
13.	"End It on This"	G. Stefani; Dumont; Kanal; E. Stefani	3:45
14.	"Tragic Kingdom"	E. Stefani	5:31
Total length:			59:35

== Personnel ==
Credits adapted from the liner notes of Tragic Kingdom.

=== No Doubt ===
- Gwen Stefani – vocals
- Tom Dumont – guitar
- Tony Kanal – bass
- Adrian Young – drums, percussion
- Eric Stefani – piano, keyboards

=== Additional musicians ===
- Phil Jordan – trumpet and flugelhorn
- Gabrial McNair – trombone, additional percussion
- Gerard Boisse – saxophone (tracks 5, 7, 14)
- Stephen Perkins – steel drum (track 1)
- Aloke Dasgupta – sitar (track 6)
- Melissa Hasin – cello (tracks 8, 10)
- Bill Bergman – saxophone (tracks 11, 12)
- Les Lovitt – trumpet (tracks 11, 12)
- Greg Smith – baritone saxophone (tracks 11, 12)
- Nick Lane – trombone (tracks 11, 12)
- Matthew Wilder – additional keyboards (tracks 3, 6)
- Albhy Galuten – director of paradigm (track 5)

=== Technical ===
- Matthew Wilder – production
- Phil Kaffel – recording (tracks 3–10, 14)
- George Landress – recording (tracks 3, 6, 7)
- Matt Hyde – recording (tracks 1, 2, 13)
- John "Tokes" Potoker – recording (tracks 11–13)
- Ray Blair – recording (track 5)
- David J. Holman – mixing at Cactus Studios (Hollywood)
- Paul Palmer – mixing at Cactus Studios (Hollywood)
- Robert Vosgien – mastering at CMS Digital (Pasadena)

=== Artwork ===
- Morbido / Bizarrio – creative direction, design, digital imaging
- Dan Arsenault – photography
- Shelly Robertson – photography
- Patrick Miller – photography

== Charts ==
=== Weekly charts ===
Weekly chart performance for Tragic Kingdom
Chart (1996–1997)	Peak position
Australian Albums (ARIA)	3
Austrian Albums (Ö3 Austria)	2
Belgian Albums (Ultratop Flanders)	1
Belgian Albums (Ultratop Wallonia)	1
Canadian Albums (Billboard)	1
Czech Albums (ČNS IFPI)	5
Danish Albums (Hitlisten)	1
Dutch Albums (Album Top 100)	2
European Albums (Music & Media)	2
Finnish Albums (Suomen virallinen lista)	1
French Albums (SNEP)	14
German Albums (Offizielle Top 100)	2
Greek Albums (IFPI)	2
Hungarian Albums (MAHASZ)	6
Icelandic Albums (Tónlist)	1
Irish Albums (IRMA)	1
Italian Albums (FIMI)	13
Japanese Albums (Oricon)	71
New Zealand Albums (RMNZ)	1
Norwegian Albums (VG-lista)	1
Portuguese Albums (AFP)	3
Scottish Albums (Official Charts)	4
Spanish Albums (AFYVE)	5
Swedish Albums (Sverigetopplistan)	3
Swiss Albums (Schweizer Hitparade)	3
UK Albums (Official Charts)	3
UK Rock & Metal Albums (Official Charts)	1
US Billboard 200	1

=== Year-end charts ===
1996 year-end chart performance for Tragic Kingdom
Chart (1996)	Position
Canada Top Albums/CDs (RPM)	16
New Zealand Albums (RMNZ)	28
US Billboard 200	19

1997 year-end chart performance for Tragic Kingdom
Chart (1997)	Position
Australian Albums (ARIA)	6
Austrian Albums (Ö3 Austria)	12
Belgian Albums (Ultratop Flanders)	24
Belgian Albums (Ultratop Wallonia)	21
Canada Top Albums/CDs (RPM)	12
Danish Albums (Hitlisten)	4
Dutch Albums (Album Top 100)	6
European Albums (Music & Media)	3
French Albums (SNEP)	42
German Albums (Offizielle Top 100)	5
New Zealand Albums (RMNZ)	13
Spanish Albums (AFYPE)	14
Swedish Albums & Compilations (Sverigetopplistan)	23
Swiss Albums (Schweizer Hitparade)	11
UK Albums (OCC)	26
US Billboard 200	2

=== Decade-end charts ===
Decade-end chart performance for Tragic Kingdom
Chart (1990–1999)	Position
US Billboard 200	22

== Certifications and sales ==
Certifications and sales for Tragic Kingdom
Region	Certification	Certified units/sales
Argentina (CAPIF)	Gold	30,000^{^}
Australia (ARIA)	4× Platinum	280,000^{^}
Austria (IFPI Austria)	Gold	25,000^{*}
Belgium (BRMA)	Platinum	50,000^{*}
Brazil (Pro-Música Brasil)	Gold	100,000^{*}
Canada (Music Canada)	Diamond	1,000,000^{^}
Finland (Musiikkituottajat)	Platinum	55,785
France (SNEP)	2× Gold	200,000^{*}
Germany (BVMI)	Gold	360,000
Israel	Gold	20,000
Italy (FIMI)	Platinum	100,000^{*}
Japan (RIAJ)	Gold	100,000^{^}
Netherlands (NVPI)	Platinum	100,000^{^}
New Zealand (RMNZ)	5× Platinum	75,000^{^}
Norway (IFPI Norway)	Platinum	60,000
Portugal	—	80,000
Spain (Promusicae)	Platinum	100,000^{^}
Sweden (GLF)	2× Platinum	200,000^{^}
Switzerland (IFPI Switzerland)	Platinum	50,000^{^}
United Kingdom (BPI)	Platinum	533,172
United States (RIAA)	Diamond	9,487,000 (Note: As of July 2012, Tragic Kingdom had sold 8,167,000 copies in the United States according to Nielsen SoundScan, with an additional 1.32 million copies sold at BMG Music Club. Nielsen SoundScan does not count albums sold through clubs like the BMG Music Service, which were significantly popular in the 1990s.)
Summaries
Asia Pacific	—	500,000
Europe (IFPI)	2× Platinum	2,000,000^{*}
Latin America	—	450,000
Worldwide	—	16,000,000
^{*} Sales figures based on certification alone.^{^} Shipments figures based on certification alone.

== See also ==
- List of best-selling albums in the United States
- List of Billboard 200 number-one albums of 1996
- List of Billboard 200 number-one albums of 1997
- List of number-one albums of 1996 (Canada)
- List of number-one albums of 1997 (Canada)
