= Just a Girl =

1995 single by No Doubt

- US CD variant of the standard artwork

Single by No Doubt

from the album Tragic Kingdom
- B-side: "Different People"
- Released: September 21, 1995
- Genre: Ska punk; pop-punk; alternative rock; new wave
- Length: 3:28
- Label: Interscope; Trauma
- Songwriters: Gwen Stefani; Tom Dumont
- Producer: Matthew Wilder

No Doubt singles chronology
"Doghouse" (1994)	"Just a Girl" (1995)	"Spiderwebs" (1995)

Music video
- "Just a Girl" on YouTube

"Just a Girl" is a song by American band No Doubt from their third studio album, Tragic Kingdom (1995). Released as the record's lead single in the United States on September 21, 1995, it was written by Gwen Stefani and Tom Dumont, and produced by Matthew Wilder. It has also made an appearance on their 2003 greatest hits album, The Singles 1992–2003. Lyrically, "Just a Girl" is about Stefani's perspective of life as a woman and her struggles with having strict parents. "Just a Girl" was the first song Stefani wrote without the assistance of her brother Eric, although the key riff was taken from one of his demos.

"Just a Girl" received positive reviews from music critics, who commended the feminist lyrics and Stefani's vocals. The single is typically regarded as being the breakthrough that popularized No Doubt. "Just a Girl" became No Doubt's first charting single in the United States, peaking at number 23 on the Billboard Hot 100 and entering the Modern Rock Tracks and Top 40/Mainstream component charts. It also reached the top ten in several other countries, including Australia, Ireland, New Zealand, Norway, Scotland, and the United Kingdom.

An accompanying music video was directed by Mark Kohr and features Stefani singing in a clean and organized restroom while the male members play their instruments in a dirty and unkept one. Separated by a wall, the men eventually climb over into the ladies' restroom and begin dancing. Stefani's attire in the music video for "Just a Girl" was a popular talking point for critics. No Doubt, and Stefani individually, has performed the song in a number of live appearances, including at the group's first concert series Tragic Kingdom World Tour (1995–1997), during the middle portion of the 2002 Rock Steady Tour, and as part of the encore during the 2016 This Is What the Truth Feels Like Tour. Stefani named her 2018–2020 concert residency in Las Vegas after the single. It has also been covered and sampled in other works by several musicians.

== Background and release ==
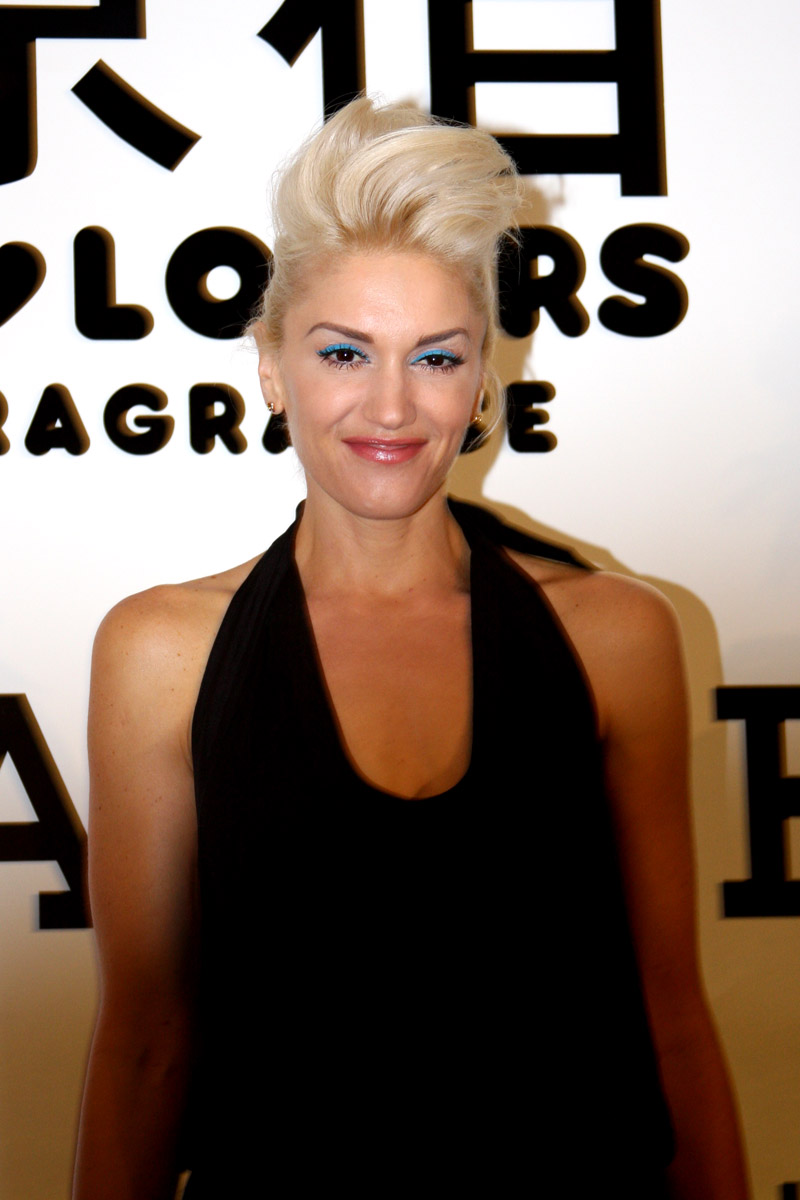
"Just a Girl" was the first song Gwen Stefani wrote without the assistance of her brother Eric Stefani.

In 1992, No Doubt released their eponymous debut album with Interscope Records, which was commercially unsuccessful and caused their record label to cancel funding for further albums and projects. In response, the band independently recorded The Beacon Street Collection (1995). Impressed by the album, Interscope agreed to resume funding for a third album, which became Tragic Kingdom (1995). "Just a Girl" was written by Gwen Stefani and Tom Dumont, with production handled by Matthew Wilder. Unlike previous songs written by the band, "Just a Girl" was not co-written by Gwen's brother Eric Stefani, who left No Doubt due to creative differences in early 1995. In response to reviewers criticizing No Doubt for changing their sound and selling out during this time, Dumont said:

Well, there is a reason that the sound of our music has changed and it's not because we've sold out, easy for me to say. Eric [...] used to write most of our songs. [This] was Gwen's first time really writing all the lyrics herself so to me, it went the opposite from selling out. We have done something that is even more personal. In the past, Eric was writing songs about his life and having Gwen sing them. Now we have Gwen singing and writing about her own experiences. It makes it more natural. She's a singer, she should sing about herself or sing what she wants to sing. I think that is the main reason why our musical style has changed.

The first song written for Tragic Kingdom, "Just a Girl" was penned by Stefani after her father reprimanded her for driving from her bandmate Tony Kanal's house late at night. Commenting on her first experience with writing a song by herself, she explained: "I just wanted to write a song to express how I was feeling in that moment and I never in my wildest dreams thought that anyone would hear it. I remember coming up with every single line [and] I have a really bad memory but I really, really remember that moment and feeling I could really relate to myself and this song … I felt like it really echoed exactly how I felt." "Just a Girl" was the first song mixed with newcomer David J. Holman, founder of Trauma Records. Following this, Holman co-signed No Doubt to his label and began working on more songs to be featured on Tragic Kingdom.

The song was first released in the United States on September 21, 1995. It was distributed on 7-inch records, cassettes, and CDs. The B-side pairing for the American release was album track "Different People", which was written by Eric Stefani, Gwen Stefani, and Tony Kanal. A two-part CD single series released in the United Kingdom includes The Beacon Street Collection track "Open the Gate", Tragic Kingdom tracks "Different People", "End It on This" and "Hey You", and a cover of the Beatles' song "Ob-La-Di-Ob-La-Da" (1968). On March 24, 1997, "Just a Girl" was re-released in Europe as a CD maxi single and features the album and live versions of "Just a Girl", in addition to live versions of "Don't Speak" and "Hey You". An enhanced CD released in the United States includes the official music video to "Just a Girl".

== Composition and lyrics ==
Stefani performing "Just a Girl" during her solo Just a Girl concert residency in 2019.

Musically, "Just a Girl" is a ska punk, pop-punk, alternative rock, and new wave song with sarcastic lyrics. It was described by Stephen Thomas Erlewine as a "pseudo-new wave" track. In addition, the song takes influence from pop and ska music, implying a "spacey" sound to the listener. Susan Christian Goulding from Orange Coast compared Stefani's vocals to both Cyndi Lauper and cartoon character Minnie Mouse; she also described "Just a Girl" as the "flip-side" of Lauper's 1983 single "Girls Just Want to Have Fun". Stefani sings in a "smoky alto" vocal range with dramatic "pouts and simpering" in order to exemplify her irritation with sexism in the music industry. The title of the song itself serves as a "sarcastic rebuke to the helpless-female cliche". Josh Tyrangiel from Time felt Stefani sang with a "hyperactive ball of energy" in "Just a Girl".

According to Musicnotes.com, "Just a Girl" is set in common time and has a fast tempo of 184 beats per minute. It is set in the key of D major, with Stefani's vocal range spanning nearly an octave and a half, from B_{3} to E_{5} in scientific pitch notation. The song progresses in the chord progressions of Bm–A–D–A in the verses and Bm–A–G–A in the chorus. According to the liner notes for No Doubt's 2003 greatest hits album, The Singles 1992–2003, the opening riff that Dumont uses for "Just a Girl" was taken from an earlier demo created by Eric Stefani.

Lyrically, the song is written from the perspective of a girl who is frustrated with her parents. Inspiration for the songwriting came to Stefani when driving home from Kanal's house: "I can remember thinking, 'Wow, I'm in the car right now, I'm driving home, it's like one in the morning and if something did happen to me, I'm vulnerable because I'm a girl.' And you start to think, 'Wow, maybe people actually look at me different [sic] because I am a female'." Other themes of "Just a Girl" display Stefani's exasperation over stereotypical female portrayals; Stefani sings: "Don't you think I know exactly where I stand? / This world is forcing me to hold your hand". She gathered examples from her sister and female friends of how being "just a girl" is patronizing. Through "sustained sarcasm", she sings: "I'm just a girl in the world / That's all that you'll let me be / I'm just a girl, all pretty and petite / So don't let me have any rights".

== Critical reception ==
"Just a Girl" was positively received by music critics. Steve Baltin from Cash Box noted that the song "has a rich blend of styles, from techno to punk, that has quickly captured the attention of listeners." He added, "Delightful, energetic and winning, "Just A Girl" offers an introduction to a band worth getting to know." Dimitri Ehrlich from Entertainment Weekly gave the song a B, adding, "With tingling synth lines, a cheery melody, and polyester production values, this single has a kitschy appeal rooted firmly in the pop of a decade ago. But the neo-feminist bent of the lyrics makes the song more than just another fun novelty item." Mike Boehm wrote in the Los Angeles Times that Stefani's lyrics of "irony and indirection" make the serious subject matter of "Just a Girl" more appealing to the listener. A reviewer from Music Week rated the song three out of five, adding, "This Californian quartet sound quirky enough with Bolanesque vocals, an ear for a good song and a spiky punk image." David Sinclair from The Times commented, "Feisty challenge to sexual stereotypes with a bopping beat from the new Blondie."

In addition to several other tracks from Tragic Kingdom, Nick Levine from Noisey praised "Just a Girl" for having a chorus "that will bounce round your brain for days".

Contemporary critics described "Just a Girl" as No Doubt's breakthrough single. It was also considered a major contribution to the success of Tragic Kingdom. Kenneth Partridge from Billboard recognized "Just a Girl" as the song that made No Doubt popular and secured Stefani's role in the music industry as the opposite of "some delicate flower who needs protecting or tolerates special treatment". Mic's Tom Barnes found that "Just a Girl" helped popularize the ska genre and called it part of a "potentially serious music movement". Ilana Kaplan from Observer wrote that "it was 'Just a Girl' that really set things into motion for No Doubt"; she continued:

The song was featured in '90s cult hits Clueless and Romy & Michelle's High School Reunion—movies that served as power-players for unlikely female heroes. Stefani's aim at a male-centric world ended up being one of the most prominent feminist anthems of the '90s—it's a song that stands out now as the music industry's misogynistic outlook continues on. Stefani's sarcasm for a lack of equality made "Just a Girl" one of the catchiest feminist anthems of the '90s.

In honor of the 20th anniversary of Tragic Kingdom, a group of critics from The A.V. Club reanalyzed the album. Marah Eakin noted that "Just a Girl" was able to "age [...] surprisingly well". Although Alex McCown disliked Stefani's pouty vocals on the track, Annie Zaleski thought her "exaggerated pouts and simpering" were intentional and dealt with the song's subject matter.

== Chart performance ==
"Just a Girl" was commercially successful, becoming No Doubt's first entry on a record chart in the United States and reaching the top ten in several countries. In the United States, "Just a Girl" debuted at number 84 on the Billboard Hot 100 on the issue dated December 16, 1995, as that week's fourth-highest debut. On the issue dated May 4, 1996, the song reached a peak of number 23 on the Billboard Hot 100, during its 21st consecutive week on the chart. It spent a total of 29 weeks on the Billboard Hot 100 and served as No Doubt's highest-charting effort until 2002's "Hey Baby" peaked at number five. "Just a Girl" was ranked number 68 on the Billboard Hot 100's 1996 year-end list. The single also received heavy airplay rotation on alternative and mainstream pop radio stations. On Billboard's Modern Rock Tracks chart, "Just a Girl" peaked at number ten, becoming their first of five entries within the top ten. It also reached number 24 on the Top 40/Mainstream chart. In July 2023, the Recording Industry Association of America certified "Just a Girl" two-times platinum for combined sales and streaming figures of 2,000,000 units.

"Just a Girl" did not enter the RPM 100 Hit Tracks chart in Canada but reached the Alternative 30 chart, where it debuted at number 28 and reached a peak of number 25 the following week. In Australia, the song peaked at number three on the ARIA Singles Chart, becoming No Doubt's first of six top ten entries. It was present within the top ten of the chart for 11 consecutive weeks. On the 1996 year-end chart in Australia, "Just a Girl" was ranked as the 22nd most-successful song of the year. The single also received a Platinum certification that same year for physical single shipments of 70,000 copies. In New Zealand, "Just a Girl" peaked at number nine and was 1996's 25th best-selling single.

In the United Kingdom, "Just a Girl" debuted at number 38 on the issue dated October 26, 1996. It dropped to number 61 the following week and departed from the chart the week afterwards. "Just a Girl" gave No Doubt their first top 40 entry in the United Kingdom. Following a wave of CD singles for the re-release of "Just a Girl" in 1997, the single entered the singles chart as a separate, new entry at number three on the issue dated July 5, 1997. It became No Doubt's second top ten single, following "Don't Speak" which topped the charts in the February of the same year. According to the Official Charts Company, "Just a Girl" was No Doubt's second-best selling single with 150,000 copies sold since "Don't Speak" sold 830,000 copies in 1997. As of March 2016, the single has sold 222,000 copies in the United Kingdom, remaining No Doubt's second-biggest and Gwen Stefani's fifth-biggest selling single combined. The song entered Billboard's European Hot 100 Singles chart, where it reached a peak at number 77 in November 1996. "Just a Girl" also reached the top ten in Ireland and Norway.

== Music video ==
Stefani wearing a bindi and dancing around the clean ladies' restroom surrounded by female attendants in the "Just a Girl" video.

An accompanying music video for "Just a Girl" was produced and acts as No Doubt's second video overall. Unlike the video for 1992's "Trapped in a Box" which was funded completely at the expense of No Doubt, the video for "Just a Girl" received funding from Interscope Records and was directed by Mark Kohr. However, the project remained low in budget in comparison to other music videos from the time. The opening scene to "Just a Girl" was filmed in the driveway of Stefani's grandparents' house on Beacon Avenue in Anaheim. Like in the lyrics of "Just a Girl", the music video features female stereotypes and serves as a "commentary on society". Dumont and Kanal both stated that it represents equality between the sexes.

The video opens with No Doubt loading instruments into the trunk of a 1965 Buick LeSabre. Stefani stands in front of a nearby wrecked Chevrolet Monte Carlo and starts singing "Just a Girl", shortly before sitting in the backseat of the other car with Dumont and Kanal. The group travels to Los Angeles and arrives at two public restrooms – one for males and one for females. Stefani enters the latter one carrying a boombox while the men enter the former carrying various musical equipment. The ladies' room is clean, brightly decorated and well-furnished with flowers, fruit and two female assistants; the men's room is dark, dirty and bare-walled. The male band members set up and play their instruments in their restroom while Stefani sings in the ladies' restroom. Various men and women enter their respective bathrooms; the men use the urinals and the women check their make-up, before dancing with the band. Eventually, the men take to lifting each other through the ceiling tiles in order to get into the other bathroom. The video ends showing everyone dancing together in the same restroom.

Stefani's choice of clothing and makeup in the video was discussed by critics, who pointed out her choices to display her midriff and wear a bindi on her forehead. MTV's Gil Kaufman wrote "from her platinum blonde hair, forehead bindi, ruby red lips and crop tops to the push-ups she bangs out at the end, the video was the world's first glimpse at what would become Stefani's iconic look and stage persona". The video was largely successful and was frequently shown on various music-related television networks, including MTV. In 2004, the video was featured on No Doubt's compilation The Videos 1992–2003.

== Live performances ==
Stefani performing "Just a Girl" during the This Is What the Truth Feels Like Tour (2016).

In 1995, No Doubt played the first-ever Warped Tour and performed "Just a Girl" to begin the promotion of Tragic Kingdom. They opened a concert at the Virgin Megastore in Los Angeles with the song in October 1995. Immediately before this performance of "Just a Girl", Stefani promised her mother that she would not curse while singing; however, Stefani did and as a consequence, her mother refused to speak to her for a week. In January 1996, No Doubt performed "Just a Girl" on the American TV show Late Night with Conan O'Brien, marking their first appearance on late night television. Later that year, on March 28, they sang "Just a Girl" on Late Show with David Letterman. After the performance, the band was delighted to learn that David Letterman had been seen "tapping his foot" against the ground as they performed.

"Just a Girl" was performed as the seventh song during their 1995–97 Tragic Kingdom World Tour. According to Rolling Stone's Chris Heath, the "greatest moment" on the concert appears during this performance: during the refrain of the song, Stefani asked the men in the crowd to sing along; after they sing "I'm just a girl" to her amusement, she then asks for the females in the audience to join her. Stefani questions: "What about all the sweet, cute, little girls? Sweet, little, tiny, sweet girls. You want to sing?" before screaming "Fuck you, I'm a girl!" The performance of the song at the July 1, 1997, show in Anaheim, at The Arrowhead Pond, was recorded and released in No Doubt's first live album, Live in the Tragic Kingdom (1997). For the 2002 Rock Steady Tour, "Just a Girl" was performed during the concert's middle segment, following singing "Simple Kind of Life" and preceding "Hey Baby". Stefani engaged the audience with questions like "Wanna know something?" and then answered in the form of a song lyric: "I'm just a girl because that's all that you'll let me be!" The New York Times's Kelefa Sanneh found this as Stefani either "addressing her fans [and] joking about the demands of stardom" or "addressing a lover [and] lodging a bitter complaint about a relationship gone awry". The performance of "Just a Girl" at the November 22–23 and 29, 2002 shows in Long Beach at the Long Beach Convention and Entertainment Center was recorded and featured on the group's second live album, Rock Steady Live (2003).

The song was performed as the opening song of No Doubt and Blink-182's Summer Tour 2004. The tour occurred specifically at amphitheaters around the United States. Prior to the performance of "Just a Girl", Queen's "We Will Rock You" was played over the PA system to welcome No Doubt. Stefani then joined the crowd from the stage wearing oversized green, plaid pants and a brown sweatshirt that emphasized her midriff. During the second iHeartRadio Music Festival in 2012, American singer Pink joined No Doubt on stage for a duetted version of "Just a Girl". The staff at Entertainment Tonight was impressed by the performance, calling it a "rad moment".

For Stefani's solo This Is What the Truth Feels Like Tour of 2016, "Just a Girl" was performed as part of the concert's encore, alongside performances of "Truth" (2016) and "The Sweet Escape" (2006). Stefani changed outfits, prior to returning to the stage, and wore a white corset that displaying the words "Blond Rebel" for the performance. In April 2018, Stefani announced a concert residency titled Just a Girl that would occur at the Planet Hollywood Resort Las Vegas. During the show, the singer performs a number including "Just a Girl" during the concert's encore. Stefani wears a "sparkly cowgirl getup" which serves as a nod to her boyfriend Blake Shelton.

No Doubt performed the "Just a Girl" on January 30, 2025 at Kia Forum in Inglewood, California for FireAid to help with relief efforts for the January 2025 Southern California wildfires.

== Cover versions and other usage ==
American country duo Bomshel included a cover of "Just a Girl" on their 2009 debut album Fight Like a Girl. JC Chasez's girl band Girl Radical recorded a cover of "Just a Girl" in 2013, which served as their official debut single. They filmed a corresponding music video for the song which was released on August 15, 2013. On a 2017 episode of MTV Unplugged, Japanese singer-songwriter Kaela Kimura covered "Just a Girl" live as the seventh song of her 14-track set list. Singer BRIX (aka Sophie Dupin) covered the song in a more mellow tone. Her version was used in the trailer for the 2018 Disney film The Nutcracker and the Four Realms, with samples from The Nutcracker Suite incorporated into it.

In 2018, Pink sampled "Just a Girl" and Nirvana's 1991 single "Smells Like Teen Spirit" during performances of her singles "Just like a Pill" (2002) and "Who Knew" (2006) for her 2018–19 Beautiful Trauma World Tour. During Pink's appearance in Los Angeles at the Staples Center, Stefani joined the singer for a surprise duet to the fans. "Just a Girl" has also been included on the scores to Clueless (1995) and Romy & Michelle's High School Reunion (1997). The song also appears in the film Captain Marvel (2019). In March 2023, the song was covered by Florence and the Machine for Showtime Networks' series Yellowjackets; their version appears in the trailer and soundtrack for the second season.

== Track listings and formats ==
- Australia and UK CD single
1. "Just a Girl" – 3:29
2. "Different People" – 4:34
3. "Open the Gate" – 3:39
- Europe CD maxi-single
1. "Just a Girl" – 3:29
2. "Just a Girl" (Live from London) – 5:37
3. "Don't Speak" (Live from Hamburg) – 5:26
4. "Hey You" (Live from Den Haag) – 3:20
- Europe CD single
1. "Just a Girl" – 3:29
2. "Just a Girl" (Live from London) – 5:37
- France CD single
1. "Just a Girl" – 3:29
2. "Don't Speak" (Live from Hamburg) – 5:26
- Netherlands CD single
1. "Just a Girl" – 3:29
2. "Different People" – 4:34
- UK 7-inch jukebox single
1. "Just a Girl" (Radio Edit) – 3:29
2. "Just a Girl" (Live from London) – 5:37
- UK cassette single

A1. "Just a Girl" (Radio Mix) – 3:29
A2. "Just a Girl" (Live from London) – 5;37
A3. "Hey You" (Live from Holland) – 3:21
A4. "Ob-La-Di-Ob-La-Da" (Live from Holland) – 3:36
B1. "Just a Girl" (Radio Mix) – 3:29
B2. "Just a Girl" (Live from London) – 5;37
B3. "Hey You" (Live from Holland) – 3:21
B4. "Ob-La-Di-Ob-La-Da" (Live from Holland) – 3:36

- UK CD single (Part 1)
1. "Just a Girl" (Radio Mix) – 3:29
2. "Open the Gate" – 3:39
3. "Just a Girl" (Live from London) – 5:37
4. "End On This" (Live from Holland) – 4:02
- UK CD single (Part 2)
1. "Just a Girl" (Radio Mix) – 3:29
2. "Different People" (Album Version) – 4:34
3. "Hey You" (Live from Holland) – 3:21
4. "Ob-La-Di-Ob-La-Da" (Live from Holland) – 3:36
- US cassette single
1. "Just a Girl" – 3:29
2. "Different People" – 4:34
3. "Just a Girl" – 3:29
4. "Different People" – 4:34
- US enhanced CD single
1. "Just a Girl" – 3:29
2. "Different People" – 4:34
3. "Just a Girl" (Music Video) – 3:27
- US promotional cassette single
1. "Just a Girl" – 3:29
2. "Sixteen" – 3:21
3. "Just a Girl" – 3:29
4. "Sixteen" – 3:21
- US promotional CD single
1. "Just a Girl" – 3:29

== Credits and personnel ==
Credits adapted from the liner notes of Tragic Kingdom.

- Gwen Stefani – writer, vocals
- Tom Dumont – writer, guitar
- Tony Kanal – bass
- Matthew Wilder – producer, additional keyboards
- Adrian Young – drums, percussion
- Eric Stefani – keyboards, piano
- Phil Jordan – trumpet
- Robert Vosgien – mastering
- David Holman – mixing
- Paul Palmer – mixing
- Phil Kaffel – recording
- George Landress – recording

== Charts ==
=== Weekly charts ===
1995–1997 weekly chart performance for "Just a Girl"
Chart (1995–1997)	Peak position
Australia (ARIA)	3
Austria (Ö3 Austria Top 40)	21
Belgium (Ultratop 50 Flanders)	37
Belgium (Ultratop 50 Wallonia)	30
Canada Rock/Alternative (RPM)	25
Europe (European Hot 100 Singles)	77
France (SNEP)	28
Germany (GfK)	24
Iceland (Íslenski Listinn Topp 40)	7
Ireland (IRMA)	10
Netherlands (Dutch Top 40)	11
Netherlands (Single Top 100)	14
New Zealand (Recorded Music NZ)	9
Norway (VG-lista)	4
Scottish Singles Sales (Official Charts)	37
Scottish Singles Sales (Official Charts) 1997 re-release	4
Sweden (Sverigetopplistan)	14
Switzerland (Schweizer Hitparade)	31
UK Singles (Official Charts)	38
UK Singles (Official Charts) 1997 re-release	3
US Billboard Hot 100	23
US Alternative Airplay (Billboard)	10
US Pop Airplay (Billboard)	24
US Cash Box Top 100	17

2019 weekly chart performance for "Just a Girl"
Chart (2019)	Peak position
US Hot Rock & Alternative Songs (Billboard)	19

=== Year-end charts ===
1996 year-end chart performance for "Just a Girl"
Chart (1996)	Position
Australia (ARIA)	22
Iceland (Íslenski Listinn Topp 40)	81
New Zealand (RIANZ)	25
Sweden (Topplistan)	67
US Billboard Hot 100	68
US Modern Rock Tracks (Billboard)	24
US Top 40/Mainstream (Billboard)	73

1997 year-end chart performance for "Just a Girl"
Chart (1997)	Position
Netherlands (Dutch Top 40)	103
Netherlands (Single Top 100)	98
UK Singles (OCC)	92

== Certifications and sales ==
Certifications for "Just a Girl"
Region	Certification	Certified units/sales
Australia (ARIA)	Platinum	70,000^{^}
New Zealand (RMNZ)	Platinum	30,000^{‡}
Norway (IFPI Norway)	Gold	
United Kingdom (BPI)	Platinum	600,000^{‡}
United States (RIAA)	2× Platinum	2,000,000^{‡}
^{^} Shipments figures based on certification alone.^{‡} Sales+streaming figures based on certification alone.

== Release history ==
Release dates and formats for "Just a Girl"
Region	Date	Format	Label	Ref.
United States	September 21, 1995	Cassette	Interscope; Trauma	
United States	January 30, 1996	Contemporary hit radio	Interscope; Trauma	
Netherlands	May 6, 1996	CD	Interscope; Trauma	
Japan	June 21, 1996	CD	Interscope; MCA	
Europe	March 24, 1997	Maxi CD	Interscope; Trauma	
United Kingdom (re-release)	June 23, 1997	CD; cassette	Interscope; Trauma	
