= Hey You! =

Single by No Doubt

from the album Tragic Kingdom
- Released: February 23, 1998
- Recorded: 1995
- Genre: Ska punk; alternative rock; psychedelic rock
- Length: 3:34
- Label: Interscope
- Songwriters: Gwen Stefani; Tony Kanal
- Producer: Matthew Wilder

No Doubt singles chronology
"Happy Now?" (1997)	"Hey You!" (1998)	"New" (1999)

Audio video
- "Hey You!" on YouTube

"Hey You!" is a song recorded by American rock band No Doubt. It was released as the seventh and final single from their third studio album Tragic Kingdom (1995). The single was released as a CD single in the Netherlands on February 23, 1998. It is the final single to feature content from original keyboardist Eric Stefani, who left the group in 1995 due to creative issues.

Musically, it incorporates several genres, including ska punk and psychedelic rock, with its lyrics portraying "a cynical view of marriage". The track received mixed to positive reviews from music critics, with one describing it as a filler and others calling it a highlight on Tragic Kingdom. Since the song was only released in the Netherlands, it only charted there, peaking at number fifty-one on the Single Top 100. A music video using footage from a live performance was directed by Sophie Muller and released alongside the CD single.

== Background and release ==
Studio sessions for "Hey You!" took place during the production process of its parent album, Tragic Kingdom (1995). Unlike their previous two studio albums, Tragic Kingdom's production was handled by outsider Matthew Wilder, to which member Eric Stefani disliked. Although seven of the album's fourteen tracks were written by Eric, he left the band shortly before its release, leaving the rest of the band to finish the songs.

The CD single was released exclusively in the Netherlands and included two tracks: the album version of "Hey You!", plus a live version that was recorded on June 1, 1997, at The Pond in Anaheim, California. The artwork of the release is the same used for the fifth single from Tragic Kingdom, "Happy Now?".

== Composition and promotion ==
"Hey You!" was written by Gwen Stefani and Kanal, with its production being handled by Matthew Wilder. The single is produced in D major, with Stefani's vocals ranging from A3–C5, layered with the use of a piano and guitars. It is a psychedelic rock and alternative rock track, with a genre similar to No Doubt's signature ska punk style. Its lyrics detail a "cynical" female protagonist hoping to get married. Kenneth Partridge, who wrote for both Billboard and The A.V. Club, stated that it has "a neo-psychedelic '60s vibe that wouldn't have sounded out of place on a Bangles record". He went on to discuss the lyrics as "a jaded Gwen gives some tough love to a girl dreaming of a white wedding" in the lines "You're just like my Ken and Barbie doll / Your name will never change". Mike Boehm, writing for the Los Angeles Times, stated that the "canny arrangement of Stefani's multitracked voice provide a poppy lift" while Dumont, Kanal, and Young "keep slickness at bay".

An accompanying music video for "Hey You!" was never created, but a video using footage from Live in the Tragic Kingdom (1997) was released alongside the CD single. In the entirety of the video and performance, Stefani "dances and bounces and sings".

== Reception ==
"Hey You!" received mixed to positive reviews upon its release. A critic from The Diamondback enjoyed the single, calling it "dreamy", stating that "songs such as these showcase the band's versatility and Stefani's sensuality as a performer". Mike Boehm of the Los Angeles Times cited the song as an "example of the band's improved craft" and claimed that it "help[s] carry the album's thematic current" of "enthusiastic music". Kenneth Partridge of Billboard panned the track, calling it "a candidate for most skippable" on the album. Since "Hey You!" was only released in the Netherlands, it was only eligible to chart there. On March 21, 1998, the single debuted at number eighty on the Single Top 100 chart, before peaking at number fifty-one. For the week ending May 2, 1998, the song dropped off from its previous position of sixty-five, lasting a total of six weeks on the chart.

== Track listing ==
CD single
No.	Title	Length
1.	"Hey You!"	3:34
2.	"Hey You!" (Live)	3:26

== Credits and personnel ==
Credits and personnel adapted from the Tragic Kingdom liner notes.

Personnel

- Gwen Stefani – vocals
- Tom Dumont – guitar
- Tony Kanal – bass
- Adrian Young – drums, percussion
- Eric Stefani – piano, keyboards
- Daniel Arsenault – cover art
- Aloke Dasgupta – sitar
- Holman – mixing
- Phil Kaffel – recording
- George Landress – recording
- Paul Palmer – mixing
- Robert Vosgien – mastering
- Matthew Wilder – production, additional keyboards

== Charts ==
Chart (1998)	Peak position
Netherlands (Dutch Top 40 Tipparade)	4
Netherlands (Single Top 100)	51

== Release history ==
Country	Date	Format	Label	Ref.
United States	February 23, 1998	CD	Interscope	
