= Daniel Arsenault =

American photographer

Daniel Arsenault is an American photographer who specializes in photos of urban settings in Manhattan, New York City. His most common technique is to take photographs with a film camera and then manipulate the images digitally to make them appear more "gritty."

Arsenault studied art and photography at the San Francisco Art Institute and received a BFA from the Art Center College of Design in Pasadena, California.

== Exhibitions ==
=== Group ===
- The Edward Carter Gallery, Soho NYC (June–August 2001)
- Albers-Roesch Studio, “American Dream Swimming Pool”, Tribeca, New York (September 2002)
- The Viewing Room, Chelsea Art District, New York (October 2002)
- September 11 Memorial Exhibition, Ward - Nasse Gallery, New York (September 2003)
- Untitled group exhibition, Ward - Nasse Gallery, New York - January 2004 -

=== Personal ===
- The Ranch Rd. Fine Art Gallery, Salt Lake City (Spring 2000)
- The Denise Robarge Gallery, Palm Springs, California (April 2001)
- The Rio Grande Gallery, Salt Lake City, Utah (March 2002)
- The Jay Hawkins Gallery, Chelsea Art District, New York (July 2002)
