= Digital speaker =

Experimental audio transducer

Digital speakers or digital sound reconstruction (DSR) systems are a form of loudspeaker technology. Not to be confused with modern digital formats and processing, they have yet to be developed as a mature technology, having been experimented with extensively by Bell Labs as far back as the 1920s, but not realized as commercial products.

== Principle of operation ==
The least significant bit drives a tiny speaker driver, of whatever physical design is chosen; a value of 1 causes this driver to be driven full amplitude, a value of 0 causes it to be off. This allows for high efficiency in the amplifier, which at any time is either passing zero current or required to drop the output voltage by zero volts; therefore, in a theoretical ideal amplifier dissipating no power as heat at any time. The next least significant bit drives a speaker of twice the area (most often, but not necessarily, a ring around the previous driver), again to either full amplitude or off. The next least significant bit drives a speaker of twice this area, and so on.

Other approaches are possible. For example, instead of doubling the area of the next most significant diaphragm segment, it could simply be driven so it stroked twice as far. The digital principle of operation and attendant amplifier efficiency benefits would remain.

With the advent of smaller transducer sizes using manufacturing processes such as CMOS-MEMS. A more practical approach is to construct an array of speakers, known as a digital loudspeaker array (DLA) or digital transducer array (DTA). The least significant bit will be represented by a single transducer, and the number will double for the next least significant bit. An n-bit speaker array will consist of 2^{n}-1 transducers, and the m^{th} bits of said arrays will contain 2^{m-1} transducers. The entire array basically function as a thermometer-coded DAC that can decode PCM signal of same number of bits as the array into sound wave. Bit grouping or PWM encoding are potential ways to decode 1-bit delta-sigma modulated signal such as DSD.

== Problems ==
Although digital speakers can function, there are various problems with this design that make it impractical for any normal uses at present.

=== Size ===
For the number of bits required for high-quality sound reproduction, the size of the system becomes impractically large. For example, for a 16-bit system with the same bit depth as the 16-bit audio CD standard, starting with a 0.5 cm^{2} driver for the least significant bit would require a total area for the driver array of 32,000 cm^{2}, or over 34 square feet (3.2 m^{2}).

=== Ultrasonic output ===
To work properly, all of the individual diaphragm elements would have to operate cleanly at the clock frequency. The natural frequency response of the various elements will vary with their size. This creates a DAC where the various bits have different bandpass characteristics. Large short-term errors can be expected.

Since this system is converting a digital signal to analog, the effect of aliasing is unavoidable, so that the audio output is "reflected" at equal amplitude in the frequency domain, on the other side of the sampling frequency. One solution would be to overclock the conversion elements, introduce a digital filter, and follow them with an acoustical low-pass filter.

Even accounting for the vastly lower efficiency of speaker drivers at such high frequencies, the result was to generate an unacceptably high level of ultrasonics accompanying the desired output.

In electronic digital-to-analog conversion, this is addressed by the use of low-pass filters to eliminate the spurious upper frequencies produced. Since these frequencies are eliminated in the electrical signal, they are not passed to the speaker and thus ultrasonic airwaves are not generated.

However, electronic filtering is inherently unable to solve this problem with the digital loudspeaker. The speaker elements must operate ultrasonically to avoid introducing (high levels of) audible artifacts, and this means ultrasonic airwaves are inevitable. Electronics can filter electrical signals, but can not remove ultrasonic frequencies already in the air.

=== Efficiency ===
Although amplifier efficiency is good with this system, moving coil speakers operate at relatively low efficiency in the ultrasonic frequency region. Thus the original aim of the method is defeated.

== Improvements ==
There are ways to tackle the above issues, but none lead to a competitive or even issue-free system.

=== Size ===
System size can be easily made practical by using less than 16 bits. With a 0.5 cm^{2} LSB, system sizes are:

- 8 bit: 128 cm^{2} total array area, or 11.3 cm × 11.3 cm (c. 4.5 inches × 4.5 inches)
- 10 bit: 22.6 cm × 22.6 cm array size.

A larger number of bits can be accommodated in a given space by varying the throw of the different elements as well as their area. This can achieve a magnitude or more of area improvement for a given bit depth. One could fit a 13-bit array into a square foot, or a 16-bit array into 4 square feet (0.37 m^{2}).

=== Ultrasonics ===
A passive air-coupled diaphragm fitted over the array of digital drivers can act as a mechanical low-pass filter. However, a sharp frequency cutoff is impossible, so significant ultrasonics would still be present. Multiple passive diaphragms could improve this, but would never remove all ultrasonics, and would only add further to the system's already high cost and complexity.

== Intractable problems ==
The complexity and thus cost are both high compared to standard moving coil speakers.

The efficiency of speakers operated at ultrasonic frequencies is low, wiping out any efficiency gain in the amplifier.

Practical speakers demand production of fairly high volumes from fairly small cabinets, a combination that is difficult to achieve using ultrasonic speaker drivers.

Full removal of ultrasonic output is impractical.

The large number of required speaker and amplifier elements reduces system reliability significantly

Other more modern approaches to high efficiency, particularly class D amplification, work much better and at much lower cost than digital speakers.

== Future development ==
=== Microelectromechanical systems ===
In recent years, there had been research on the topic of construction of digital loudspeaker arrays in digital sound reconstruction systems using microelectromechanical systems (MEMS). MEMS micro-speaker arrays can be manufactured onto a chip using a CMOS process. A single-chip system will have less variation between each subunit compared to a multi-chip system. An Australian-Israeli company called Audiopixels recently demonstrated proof of concept in the company's clean room. The audio demonstrates the effectiveness of the MEMS technology after many years of development. CMOS-MEMS process reduces the size of each subunit to a few hundred μm in diameter.

== Speakers marketed as digital ==
Modern speakers marketed as 'digital' are always analog speakers, in most cases driven by an analog amplifier. The widespread use of the term 'digital' with speakers is a marketing ploy intended to claim better suitability with 'digital' source material (e.g., MP3 recordings), or impute 'higher technology' than some other speaker, and perhaps higher price. If pressed, manufacturers may claim the term means the product is 'ready' for input from digital players; this is true of essentially all speaker systems.

There are also a minority of Class D and Class T digital amplifier-driven analog speakers, though these are not normally found in separate computer speakers or home stereo systems. These are common in laptops, where their higher cost is justified by battery power savings. The speakers in such equipment are still analog.

== See also ==
- Loudspeaker
- Loudspeaker enclosure
