= Eric Stefani =

American musician and animator (born 1967)

- Born: Eric Matthew Stefani; June 17, 1967 (age 59); Fullerton, California, U.S.
- Origin: Anaheim, California, U.S.
- Genres: Ska punk
- Occupations: Keyboardist; songwriter; animator
- Instruments: Keyboards; guitar; vocals
- Years active: 1986–present
- Labels: Interscope; Trauma; Atlantic
- Formerly of: No Doubt

Eric Matthew Stefani (born June 17, 1967) is an American musician and animator best known as a founder and former member of the ska punk band No Doubt. He is the elder brother of former bandmate Gwen Stefani. He is also a former animator on the television series The Simpsons.

== Early life and education ==
Stefani is the son of Dennis and Patti Stefani. He attended Loara High School in Anaheim, California. He worked at a Dairy Queen with his sister Gwen and John Spence. After high school, he attended Cypress College. He went on to study animation at the California Institute of the Arts in 1991.

According to No Doubt's guitarist Tom Dumont, Eric was able to write music for the band despite not knowing music theory—an accomplishment that impressed Dumont, since he was a music major.

== Career ==
Stefani, his sister Gwen and John Spence formed the band No Doubt in 1986. Stefani also landed a job drawing for The Simpsons in 1989, when it was still a short on The Tracey Ullman Show; he continued working on The Simpsons after it became its own successful series, splitting his time between the show and the band.

The group added several members and performed live shows at venues such as Fenders Ballroom in Long Beach. The group started writing original material, most of which Eric Stefani contributed. Stefani also designed the posters and logos for the band during this time, and Gwen credited Eric's skills as a cartoonist with inventing her early pop star persona. Tom Dumont referred to Eric as "the main creative force in the band for many years."

Stefani wrote or co-wrote all of the songs on No Doubt's self-titled debut album. The album did not meet expectations, and Stefani was distant from his bandmates during the ensuing tour. The band began work on its next album the following year but their record label Interscope Records rejected much of its material (the album would eventually be independently released as The Beacon Street Collection), and the band was paired with producer Matthew Wilder.

Stefani, who preferred songwriting to touring and felt diminishing creative control, left the band in 1994 before their third album Tragic Kingdom was released. He wrote two songs on the album and co-wrote five others. Eric and Gwen were nominated as a songwriting team at the 1998 Grammy Awards for Song of the Year for "Don't Speak".

After leaving the band, Stefani returned to animating full-time for The Simpsons, having previously split his time between the show and the band. The episode "Homerpalooza" contains a quick scene, drawn by Stefani, where the members of No Doubt appear, although they are not featured.

In 2000, Stefani briefly reunited with his former bandmates on VH1 Storytellers, playing piano during a live performance of Trapped in a Box.

In an interview on Late Night with Seth Meyers on October 26, 2020, Gwen revealed that Eric recorded some instrumentation on one of the tracks for her upcoming album, which ended up being "Let Me Reintroduce Myself".
