= No Doubt discography =

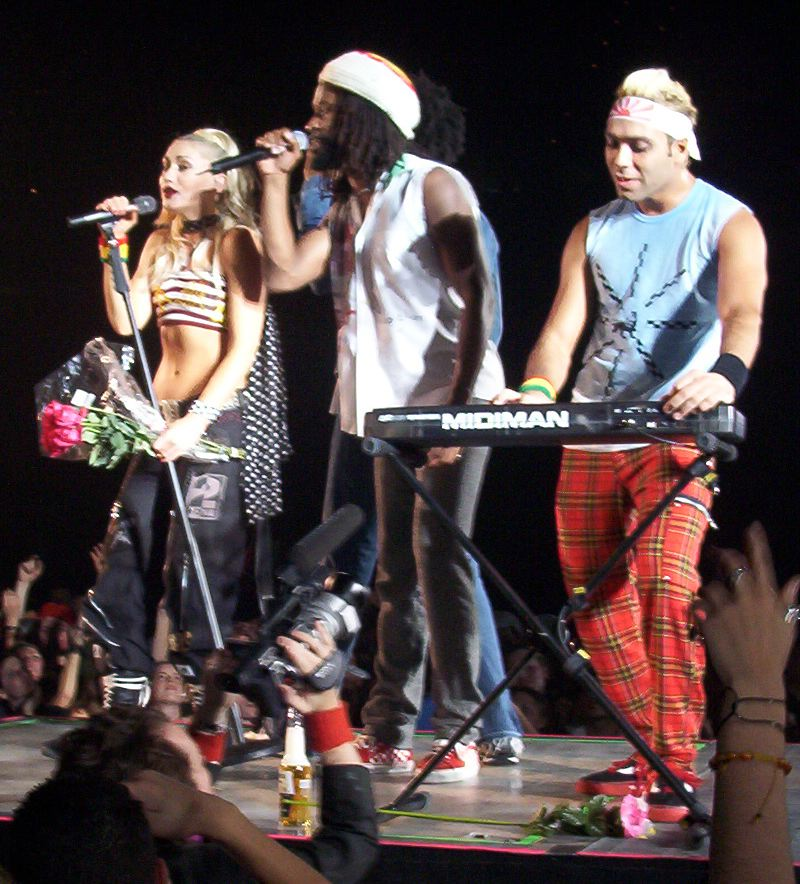
- Studio albums: 6
- Compilation albums: 6
- Singles: 22
- Video albums: 3
- Music videos: 20
- Promotional singles: 5

American rock band No Doubt has released six studio albums, five compilation albums, three video albums, 22 singles, five promotional singles, and 21 music videos. The band was formed in Anaheim, California in 1986. After many line-up changes, it released its self-titled debut album in 1992, but its ska-pop sound was overshadowed by the popularity of the grunge movement. Following the self-released The Beacon Street Collection, Tragic Kingdom was released in 1995 and rode the surge of ska punk, becoming the group's best selling studio album, largely due to the international success of its third single "Don't Speak".

No Doubt's follow-up, Return of Saturn, was released nearly five years later and was quickly certified Platinum in the US, but failed to match the success of Tragic Kingdom. The band collaborated with many producers and other artists to record Rock Steady in under a year, mixing the band's new wave and pop sounds with ragga music. The album was a comeback for the band, selling well and yielding career-highest singles chart positions. After Rock Steady, the band's label released several compilations and the group went on hiatus. Gwen Stefani released three solo albums and a Christmas album. Guitarist Tom Dumont's side project Invincible Overlord, a collaboration with Ted Matson, released The Living Album and a remix of No Doubt's song "Bathwater" on its website. After reforming, No Doubt released their sixth album, Push and Shove, in 2012: two singles, "Settle Down" and "Looking Hot" were released from the album.

== Albums ==
=== Studio albums ===
List of studio albums, with selected chart positions, sales figures and certifications
title	Album details	Peak chart positions										Sales	Certifications
title	Album details	US	AUS	AUT	CAN	GER	NLD	NZ	SWE	SWI	UK	Sales	Certifications
No Doubt	Released: March 17, 1992 (US); Label: Interscope; Formats: Cassette · CD · LP	—	—	—	—	—	—	—	—	—	—	US: 322,000	MC: Gold
The Beacon Street Collection	Released: March 25, 1995 (US); Label: Beacon Street; Formats: Cassette · CD	—	—	—	—	—	—	—	—	—	—	US: 138,000	
Tragic Kingdom	Released: October 10, 1995 (US); Label: Interscope; Formats: Cassette · CD · LP	1	3	2	1	2	2	1	3	3	3	US: 8,167,000; World: 16,000,000	RIAA: Diamond; ARIA: 4× Platinum; BPI: Platinum; BVMI: Gold; IFPI AUT: Gold; IFPI SWE: 2× Platinum; IFPI SWI: Platinum; MC: Diamond; NVPI: Platinum; RMNZ: 5× Platinum
Return of Saturn	Released: April 11, 2000 (US); Label: Interscope; Formats: Cassette · CD · LP	2	11	18	4	5	24	14	7	8	31	US: 1,587,000	RIAA: Platinum; MC: Platinum
Rock Steady	Released: December 11, 2001 (US); Label: Interscope; Formats: Cassette · CD · digital download · LP	9	15	12	21	13	66	17	52	33	43	US: 2,842,000	RIAA: 2× Platinum; ARIA: Gold; BPI: Gold; MC: Platinum
Push and Shove	Released: September 25, 2012 (US); Label: Interscope; Formats: CD · digital download · picture disc · LP	3	8	11	5	11	28	11	55	9	16	US: 115,000	
"—" denotes a recording that did not chart or was not released in that territory.

=== Compilation albums ===
List of compilation albums, with selected chart positions, sales figures and certifications
title	Album details	Peak chart positions										Sales	Certifications
title	Album details	US	AUS	AUT	CAN	GER	NLD	NZ	SWE	SWI	UK	Sales	Certifications
Collector's Orange Crate	Released: December 16, 1997 (US); Label: Interscope; Formats: CD box set, DVD	—	—	—	—	—	—	—	—	—	—		
Boom Box	Released: November 25, 2003 (US); Label: Interscope; Formats: CD box set, DVD	—	—	—	—	—	—	—	—	—	—		
The Singles 1992–2003	Released: November 25, 2003 (US); Label: Interscope; Formats: CD, cassette, digital download	2	15	11	6	14	8	8	1	5	5	US: 2,474,000	RIAA: 2× Platinum; ARIA: Platinum; BPI: 2× Platinum; BVMI: Gold; IFPI SWI: Gold; MC: 2× Platinum; RMNZ: Platinum
Everything in Time	Released: October 12, 2004 (US); Label: Interscope; Formats: CD, cassette, digital download	182	—	—	—	—	—	—	—	—	—		
Icon	Released: November 2, 2010 (US); Label: Interscope; Formats: CD, digital download, LP	—	—	—	—	—	—	—	—	—	—		
The Set List	Released: April 26, 2024 (US); Label: Interscope; Formats: Digital download	—	—	—	—	—	—	—	—	—	—		
"—" denotes a recording that did not chart or was not released in that territory.

=== Video albums ===
List of video albums, with selected chart positions and certifications
title	Album details	Peak chart positions	Certifications
title	Album details	US Video	Certifications
Live in the Tragic Kingdom	Released: November 11, 1997 (US); Label: Interscope; Formats: VHS, DVD	5	MC: Gold
Rock Steady Live	Released: November 25, 2003 (US); Label: Interscope; Formats: DVD	30	RIAA: Gold
The Videos 1992–2003	Released: April 6, 2004 (US); Label: Interscope; Formats: DVD	3	RIAA: Gold

== Singles ==
List of singles, with selected chart positions and certifications, showing year released and album name
title	Year	Peak chart positions										Certifications	Album
title	Year	US	AUS	AUT	CAN	GER	NLD	NZ	SWE	SWI	UK	Certifications	Album
"Trapped in a Box"	1992	—	—	—	—	—	—	—	—	—	—		No Doubt
"Squeal"	1994	—	—	—	—	—	—	—	—	—	—		The Beacon Street Collection
"Doghouse"	1994	—	—	—	—	—	—	—	—	—	—		The Beacon Street Collection
"Just a Girl"	1995	23	3	21	—	24	14	9	14	31	3	RIAA: 2× Platinum; ARIA: Platinum; BPI: Platinum; RMNZ: Platinum	Tragic Kingdom
"Spiderwebs"	1995	— (Note: "Spiderwebs" was ineligible to chart on the Billboard Hot 100 due to not being available as a physical commercial single in the US, but peaked at number 18 on the Hot 100 Airplay chart.)	46	—	11	—	85	30	23	—	16	RIAA: Platinum	Tragic Kingdom
"Don't Speak"	1996	— (Note: "Don't Speak" was ineligible to chart on the Billboard Hot 100 due to not being available as a physical commercial single in the US, but peaked at number one on the Hot 100 Airplay chart.)	1	2	1	2	1	1	1	1	1	RIAA: 3× Platinum; ARIA: 2× Platinum; BPI: 2× Platinum; BVMI: Platinum; IFPI AUT: Gold; IFPI SWE: Gold; IFPI SWI: Platinum; NVPI: Gold; RMNZ: 3× Platinum	Tragic Kingdom
"Excuse Me Mr."	1996	—	—	—	—	—	—	11	—	—	—		Tragic Kingdom
"Sunday Morning"	1997	—	21	—	33	—	—	42	55	—	50	RIAA: Gold; ARIA: Gold	Tragic Kingdom
"Happy Now?"	1997	—	132	—	—	—	—	—	—	—	—		Tragic Kingdom
"Hey You!"	1998	—	—	—	—	—	51	—	—	—	—		Tragic Kingdom
"New"	1999	— (Note: "New" did not enter the Billboard Hot 100, but peaked at number 23 on the Bubbling Under Hot 100 Singles chart.)	89	—	—	—	98	—	—	—	30		Return of Saturn
"Ex-Girlfriend"	2000	— (Note: "Ex-Girlfriend" did not enter the Billboard Hot 100, but peaked at number 11 on the Bubbling Under Hot 100 Singles chart.)	9	—	—	34	35	11	18	19	23	ARIA: Gold	Return of Saturn
"Simple Kind of Life"	2000	38	94	—	52	—	98	—	—	—	69		Return of Saturn
"Bathwater"	2000	—	71	—	—	73	—	—	—	—	—		Return of Saturn
"Hey Baby" (featuring Bounty Killer)	2001	5	7	12	—	8	14	2	17	11	2	RIAA: Gold; ARIA: Gold	Rock Steady
"Hella Good"	2002	13	8	44	26	46	57	17	—	78	12	RIAA: Platinum; ARIA: Gold; BPI: Silver; RMNZ: Gold	Rock Steady
"Underneath It All" (featuring Lady Saw)	2002	3	28	34	—	42	49	8	39	54	18	RIAA: Platinum; RMNZ: Platinum	Rock Steady
"Running"	2003	62	—	—	—	55	—	—	—	—	—		Rock Steady
"It's My Life"	2003	10	7	12	—	9	6	8	4	12	17 (Note: "It's My Life" peaked at number 20 on its initial 2003 release in the United Kingdom. The UK 2004 release of "It's My Life" and "Bathwater" (Invincible Overlord Remix) charted as a double A-side single on the UK Singles Chart.)	RIAA: Platinum; ARIA: Platinum; BPI: Silver; RMNZ: Gold	The Singles 1992–2003
"Bathwater" (Invincible Overlord remix)	2004	—	61	—	—	73	—	—	—	42	17		The Singles 1992–2003
"Settle Down"	2012	34	41	13	23	31	69	34	—	48	85		Push and Shove
"Looking Hot"	2012	—	—	—	—	—	—	—	—	—	—		Push and Shove
"—" denotes a recording that did not chart or was not released in that territory.

=== Promotional singles ===
List of promotional singles, showing year released and album name
title	Year	Album
"Cellophane Boy"	2000	Non-album single
"Big Distraction"	2000	Return of Saturn
"Making Out"	2002	Rock Steady
"Stand and Deliver"	2009	Push and Shove
"Push and Shove" (featuring Busy Signal and Major Lazer)	2012	Push and Shove

== Guest appearances ==
List of non-single guest appearances, with other performing artists, showing year released and album name
title	Year	Other performer(s)	Album
"Everything's Wrong"	1988	—N/a	Ska-Ville USA Vol. 3
"Up Yours"	1992	—N/a	California Ska-Quake, Vol. 1
"Snakes"	1996	—N/a	Beavis and Butt-Head Do America soundtrack
"Oi to the World"	1997	—N/a	A Very Special Christmas 3
"I Throw My Toys Around"	1998	Elvis Costello	The Rugrats Movie soundtrack
"Hateful"	1999	—N/a	Burning London: The Clash Tribute
"Love to Love You Baby"	2001	—N/a	Zoolander soundtrack
"Perfect Day"	2001	Kelis	Wanderland
"Monkey Man"	2004	Toots and the Maytals	True Love
"D.J.'s"	2005	—N/a	Look at All the Love We Found

== Music videos ==
List of music videos, with directors, showing year released
title	Year	Director(s)
"Trapped in a Box"	1992	Mike Zykoff
"Just a Girl"	1995	Mark Kohr
"Spiderwebs"	1996	Marcus Nispel
"Don't Speak"	1996	Sophie Muller
"Excuse Me Mr."	1996	Sophie Muller
"Sunday Morning"	1997	Sophie Muller
"Oi to the World"	1997	Sophie Muller
"New"	1999	Jake Scott
"Ex-Girlfriend"	2000	Hype Williams
"Simple Kind of Life"	2000	Sophie Muller
"Bathwater"	2000	Sophie Muller
"Hey Baby" (featuring Bounty Killer)	2001	David Meyers
"Hella Good"	2002	Mark Romanek
"Underneath It All" (featuring Lady Saw)	2002	Sophie Muller and Logan
"Running"	2003	Chris Hafner
"It's My Life"	2003	David LaChapelle
"Bathwater" (Invincible Overlord Remix)	2004	Sophie Muller
"Settle Down"	2012	Sophie Muller
"Push and Shove" (featuring Busy Signal and Major Lazer)	2012	Sophie Muller
"Looking Hot"	2012	Melina Matsoukas

== See also ==
- Gwen Stefani discography
