= Seven Night Stand =

2012 concert residency by No Doubt

- Residency by No Doubt
- Location: Los Angeles, California, U.S.
- Venue: Gibson Amphitheatre
- Associated album: Push and Shove
- Duration: November 24, 2012 – December 6, 2012
- No. of shows: 7

No Doubt concert chronology
- 2009 Summer Tour (2009); Seven Night Stand (2012)

Seven Night Stand was a concert residency by American rock band No Doubt, performed at Gibson Amphitheatre in Los Angeles, California, United States.

== Set list ==
1. "Push and Shove"
2. "It's My Life"
3. "Hella Good"
4. "Underneath It All"
5. "Ex-Girlfriend"
6. "Hey Baby"
7. "New"
8. "Hey You!"
9. "Sparkle"
10. "Simple Kind of Life"
11. "One More Summer"
12. "Sunday Morning"
13. "Bathwater"
14. "Settle Down"
15. "Don't Speak"
16. "Just a Girl"

Encore

17. "Guns Of Navarone"
18. "Looking Hot"
19. "Excuse Me Mr."
20. "Total Hate 95"
21. "Spiderwebs"

== Shows ==
List of concerts, showing date, opening acts, tickets sold, number of available tickets and amount of gross revenue
| Date | Opening acts | Attendance | Revenue |
|---|---|---|---|
| November 24, 2012 | Grouplove; Nico Vega | | |
| November 26, 2012 | Grouplove; Io Echo | | |
| November 28, 2012 | Grouplove; Blaqk Audio | | |
| November 30, 2012 | Fitz and the Tantrums; The Aggrolites | | |
| December 2, 2012 | Fitz and The Tantrums; Noise of Rumors | | |
| December 4, 2012 | Best Coast; Kitten | | |
| December 6, 2012 | Best Coast; Jjamz | | |
