= Push and shove =

Push and shove may refer to:

- Push and Shove (album), by No Doubt, 2012
  - "Push and Shove" (song), the title song
- Push and shove router, a type of router supported by various EDA layout programs
- "Push and Shove", a song by Fatboy Slim from Palookaville
- "Push and Shove", a song by Hazel O'Connor and Chris Thompson from Greenpeace – The Album

== See also ==
- A Push and a Shove, a 2007 novel by Christopher Kelly
