= Summer Tour 2004 (Blink-182 and No Doubt) =

2004 concert tour by Blink-182 and No Doubt

- Tour by Blink-182 and No Doubt
- Promotional poster of the tour
- Location: North America
- Associated album: Blink-182; The Singles 1992–2003
- Start date: June 1, 2004
- End date: June 26, 2004
- Legs: 1
- No. of shows: 15
Blink-182 tour chronology
Blink-182 Tour (2003–04)	Summer Tour 2004 (2004)	Blink-182 Tour (2004)
No Doubt tour chronology
Rock Steady Tour (2002)	Summer Tour 2004 (2004)	2009 Summer Tour (2009)

Blink-182 / No Doubt Summer Tour 2004 was a concert tour co-headlined by American rock bands Blink-182 and No Doubt. Launched in support of Blink-182's eponymous fifth studio album and No Doubt's The Singles 1992–2003, the tour took place in the summer of 2004 and saw the two Southern California groups travel to US amphitheatres.

== Background ==
The tour was announced in February 2004 as a co-headlining amphitheater trek featuring No Doubt and blink-182, running from June 1 to June 26. The tour was promoted as a reunion of two Southern California bands with a shared history dating back more than a decade. Tom DeLonge said blink-182 was "honored" to share the stage with No Doubt again after previously touring together in the mid-1990s. At the time, No Doubt was promoting their The Singles 1992–2003 compilation, and it marked their last outing before an extended hiatus. The pairing followed successful headlining tours by both bands, with blink-182's 2002 co-headlining outing with Green Day grossing nearly $20 million and No Doubt's 2002 headlining tour grossing $9.6 million.

It was scheduled around Gwen Stefani's commitments to her debut solo album, Love. Angel. Music. Baby., and filming Martin Scorsese's The Aviator. The short tour kicked-off at Indianapolis’ Verizon Wireless Amphitheatre on June 1, 2004, and ended back in Southern California, at San Bernardino’s Hyundai Pavilion, on June 26, 2004. That final show was marred by severe traffic congestion that left hundreds of concertgoers stranded outside the venue for hours, causing many to miss the performance. Promoter Clear Channel Entertainment later apologized and offered refunds and complimentary tickets to affected fans.

== Reception ==
Reviews of Summer Tour 2004 generally favored No Doubt over blink-182, with many critics praising Gwen Stefani's commanding stage presence and dynamic performance while finding blink-182's comedy routines increasingly repetitive and juvenile.

Travis Hay of the Seattle Post-Intelligencer praised the pairing of No Doubt and blink-182, highlighting Travis Barker's drum solo while concluding that Gwen Stefani's boundless energy made No Doubt the stronger act. Jae-Ha Kim of the Chicago Sun-Times praised both bands for delivering energetic performances, but found No Doubt to be the tighter live act, highlighting Gwen Stefani's athletic performance and professionalism while crediting blink-182's humor and audience rapport. Joe D'Angelo of MTV News considered No Doubt's performance largely better than Blink's, writing that "The audience here was wholly under [Gwen Stefani's] spell, given that on this particular night, No Doubt were the best show in town, even if Blink played one hell of a concert." Lynn Miller of The Patriot Ledger also found both enjoyable: while he found No Doubt's polished, genre-spanning set to be the stronger performance, he credited blink-182 with delivering a fast-paced, energetic show. Sean Daly of The Washington Post praised No Doubt, describing Gwen Stefani as "rock's reigning queen", while finding blink-182's fast-paced performance less effective, arguing that many of their songs blurred together live.

Others found the contrast more stark. Brett Oppegaard of The Columbian dismissed blink-182's performance as overlong and repetitive, arguing that the band's trademark humor had worn thin and that the set was padded with excessive banter. By contrast, he praised No Doubt's performance as dynamic and tightly executed, describing it as the evening's clear highlight and noting that Stefani's ability to command the crowd, backed by a polished band, left blink-182 "in the dust." Reviewing the opening night of the tour, David Lindquist of The Indianapolis Star praised Stefani's charismatic, versatile showmanship and describing the band's performance as "fresh and motivated." He contrasted it with blink-182, acknowledging that the trio was touring behind its "most mature and musically accomplished album," but arguing that its "unattractive jokes" remained central to its appeal. Christian Hoard of Rolling Stone praised Stefani's onstage energy and No Doubt's polished, dance-inflected performance, while also commending blink-182's artistic maturation despite criticizing the band's characteristically sloppy playing.

== Set lists ==
=== Blink-182 ===
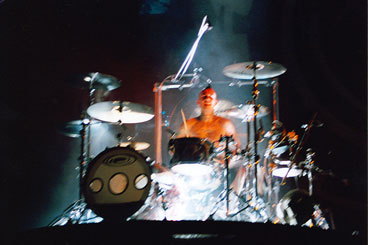
Blink-182 drummer Travis Barker performed an extended drum solo rooted in "hip-hop and drum'n'bass beats for a display of musical dexterity and brash attitude."

1. "Feeling This"
2. "Easy Target"
3. "What's My Age Again?"
4. "Violence"
5. "The Rock Show"
6. "Obvious"
7. "I Miss You"
8. "Asthenia"
9. "Adam's Song"
10. "First Date"
11. "Go"
12. "Stay Together for the Kids"
13. "Dumpweed" / "M+M's" / "Josie" / "Man Overboard"
14. "Reckless Abandon"
15. "All the Small Things"
16. "Down"
17. "The Fallen Interlude" / Travis Barker drum solo
18. "Stockholm Syndrome"
19. "Dammit"

=== No Doubt ===
1. "Just a Girl"
2. "Excuse Me Mr."
3. "Ex-Girlfriend"
4. "Underneath It All"
5. "Hey Baby"
6. "Bathwater"
7. "Running"
8. "Simple Kind of Life" (acoustic)
9. "Hella Good"
10. "New"
11. "Don't Speak"
12. "It's My Life"
13. "Spiderwebs"

Encore

14. "Sunday Morning"

== Tour dates ==
List of 2004 concerts
Date	City	Country	Venue
June 1, 2004	Noblesville	United States	Verizon Wireless Music Center
June 3, 2004	Holmdel	United States	PNC Bank Arts Center
June 4, 2004	Holmdel	United States	PNC Bank Arts Center
June 6, 2004	Camden	United States	Tweeter Center at the Waterfront
June 8, 2004	Mansfield	United States	Tweeter Center
June 11, 2004	Bristow	United States	Nissan Pavilion
June 12, 2004	Cuyahoga Falls	United States	Blossom Music Center
June 13, 2004	Tinley Park	United States	Tweeter Center
June 16, 2004	Auburn	United States	White River Amphitheatre
June 17, 2004	Ridgefield	United States	The Amphitheater at Clark County
June 19, 2004	Mountain View	United States	Shoreline Amphitheatre
June 21, 2004	Wheatland	United States	Sleep Train Amphitheatre
June 23, 2004	Phoenix	United States	Cricket Pavilion
June 24, 2004	Chula Vista	United States	Coors Amphitheatre
June 26, 2004	San Bernardino	United States	Hyundai Pavilion

== See also ==
- Pop Disaster Tour – 2002 concert tour by Blink-182 and Green Day
