= Looking Hot =

Single by No Doubt

from the album Push and Shove
- Released: November 6, 2012
- Studio: Kingsbury Studios (Los Feliz, CA); MixSuite L.A. (Santa Monica, CA); The Sideshack (Long Beach, CA); Kingston Sound (Los Angeles, CA)
- Genre: Synth-pop; reggae fusion
- Length: 4:42
- Label: Interscope
- Songwriters: Gwen Stefani; Tony Kanal; Tom Dumont
- Producer: Mark "Spike" Stent

No Doubt singles chronology
"Settle Down" (2012)	"Looking Hot" (2012)

Lyric video
- "Looking Hot" on YouTube

"Looking Hot" is a song by American rock band No Doubt, released as the band second and final single from their sixth studio album, Push and Shove. It was written by Gwen Stefani, Tony Kanal and Tom Dumont, and produced by Mark "Spike" Stent.

Its music video was pulled a day after being released and received controversy for its cultural appropriation and its stereotypical depiction of First Nations people.

== Background and release ==
After releasing "Settle Down" as the lead single from "Push and Shove" (2012), No Doubt released a music video for the album's title track. However, they announced that they were unsure whether the track would be a single, where it was then later confirmed that "Looking Hot" would be released as the second official single from the album instead.

In an interview for MTV News, the band members Gwen Stefani and Tony Kanal commented that the song almost didn't make the cut for Push and Shove and that, for a while there, No Doubt weren't sure if it was a song at all. She told, "The next single we're going to do is called 'Looking Hot,' and I love that song! [It] was one of those songs that was almost thrown away; it was an end of a song that turned into a chorus that ended up being [a song] ... it was one of those weird transitional songs."

== Recording and production ==
"Looking Hot" was written by band members Gwen Stefani, Tony Kanal and Tom Dumont. Mark "Spike" Stent produced and mixed the song, while additional production was done by Anthony Gorry. Programming and keyboards was provided by Anthony Gorry and Jonas Quant, with trombone and melodica being provided by Gabrial McNair, with Stephen Bradley providing the trumpet. The song was recorded at four studios: the Kingsbury Studios, (in Los Feliz), MixSuite LA (in Santa Monica), The Sideshack (in Long Beach), and Kingston Sound (in Los Angeles).

== Composition and lyrics ==
"Looking Hot" is a synth-slathered pop song replete with a dose of ska and reggae flavor, with a pounding arena-rave beat, drenched in 1980s new wave tones. Lyrically, "Looking Hot" finds Gwen Stefani spouting tongue-in-cheek lyrics about being a well-preserved forty-something frontwoman, wondering how much longer she can indulge in skintight clothes. "Go ahead and look at me cause that's what I want. Take a good look won't you please cause that's what I want," she sings over lazy brass lines and cushy synth runs. "I know you want to stare. You can't help it and I don't care." According to James Montgomery of MTV News, the song "pairs club-ready thump with catwalk-approved strut, with breezy horns, melding their skanking past with their shiny pop present.

== Critical reception ==
"Looking Hot" received positive reviews from music critics. Caroline Sullivan of The Guardian called it "a catchy club tune influenced by Stefani's solo albums." Andy Gill of The Independent thought that the song "resembles a Kylie-esque club stomper." Sarah H. Grant of Consequence of Sound named it "a Confessions on a Dance Floor-style disco jam." Theon Weber of Spin called it "nearly ridiculous", writing that the song is "a refinement of their late-period hit 'Hey Baby" — synthesize these two urges, the two long ends of the party: Its bobbleheaded opening the melancholy comedown."

Amy Sciarretto of PopCrush gave the song three out of five stars, writing that, "This is the danciest that the So Cal band has sounded, thanks to the thunderous, assertive beat at the center of the song. It almost sounds like Stefani is singing over programmed, computer-generated instruments, since it's super synthetic. It's actually closer to Stefani's solo material than it is to No Doubt, since her compadres don't factor heavily into the song.[...] This could be No Doubt's version of a club banger, but we don't think it will be the favorite song of its diehard, Warped Tour-attending fans." The song placed at number 44 in Popjustice's Top 45 singles for the year 2012, being considered a song that "could have been a Gwen single."

== Commercial performance ==
"Looking Hot" had sold 1,400 copies by November.

== Promotion and live performances ==
No Doubt performed "Looking Hot" on The Ellen DeGeneres Show on September 25, 2012 along with 1995's "Spiderwebs". The group performed the song on The Tonight Show with Jay Leno on October 25, 2012, an episode featuring President Barack Obama as the only guest. The song was also performed on The X Factor on November 4, at the 2012 MTV Europe Music Awards in Frankfurt, Germany, on November 11, and at the American Music Awards of 2012 on November 18.

== Music video ==
The depiction of Native Americans in the video generated controversy, particularly Gwen Stefani's appearance. Joyce Chen of the Daily News said Stefani donned a "high-fashion interpretation of a traditional Native American headdress."

The "cowboys and Indians" themed music video for the song was directed by Melina Matsoukas, and premiered on November 2, 2012. It was removed by the band the next day amid controversy for its stereotypical depiction of Native Americans.

No Doubt released a statement on their website apologizing: "As a multi-racial band, our foundation is built upon both diversity and consideration for other cultures. Our intention with our new video was never to offend, hurt or trivialize Native American people, their culture or their history. Although we consulted with Native American friends and Native American studies experts at the University of California, we realize now that we have offended people. This is of great concern to us and we are removing the video immediately. The music that inspired us when we started the band, and the community of friends, family, and fans that surrounds us was built upon respect, unity and inclusiveness. We sincerely apologize to the Native American community and anyone else offended by this video. Being hurtful to anyone is simply not who we are."

The American Indian Studies Center of the University of California, Los Angeles – whom No Doubt claimed to have consulted prior to filming the video – released an open letter to No Doubt which noted "perceptions that American Indians are mere historical relics, frozen in time as stereotypically savage, primitive, uniquely-spiritualized and – in the case of Native women – hyper-sexualized objects to be tamed", and said the video "is replete with such highly offensive and destructive images of Native peoples in general and Native women specifically" and that it was "rife with imagery that glorifies aggression against Indian people, and, most disturbingly, denigrates and objectifies Native women through scenes of sexualized violence", but commended the band's decision to remove the video.

== Track listings ==
- Digital single
1. "Looking Hot" – 4:43
2. "Looking Hot" (Stephen Hilton Remix) – 7:14
3. "Settle Down" (Jonas Quant Remix) – 4:33
- The Remixes
1. "Looking Hot" (Kill Paris Remix) – 4:22
2. "Looking Hot" (R3hab Remix) – 4:23
3. "Looking Hot" (Stephen Hilton Remix) – 7:14

== Credits and personnel ==
- Gwen Stefani – songwriter, vocals
- Tom Dumont – songwriter, guitar
- Tony Kanal – songwriter, bass guitar
- Adrian Young – drums, percussion
- Mark "Spike" Stent – mixer, producer
- Anthony Gorry – programming and keyboards, additional producer

Credits adapted from Push and Shove liner notes.

== Release history ==
Release dates and formats for "Looking Hot"
Region	Date	Format	Label(s)	Ref.
United States	November 6, 2012	Mainstream airplay	Interscope	
