= Settle Down (No Doubt song) =

2012 single by No Doubt

Single by No Doubt

from the album Push and Shove
- Released: July 16, 2012
- Studio: Kingsbury Studios (Los Feliz, California); Henson Recording Studios (Los Angeles, California); MixSuite LA (Santa Monica, California); The Nook (Studio City, California)
- Genre: Reggae fusion; dancehall
- Length: 6:01 (album version); 3:36 (radio edit)
- Label: Interscope
- Songwriters: Gwen Stefani; Tony Kanal; Tom Dumont
- Producer: Spike Stent

No Doubt singles chronology
"Bathwater" (Invincible Overlord remix) (2004)	"Settle Down" (2012)	"Looking Hot" (2012)

Audio sample
- "Settle Down": file; help

Music video
- "Settle Down" on YouTube

"Settle Down" is a song by American rock band No Doubt. It is the first single from their sixth studio album Push and Shove (2012). Written by Gwen Stefani, Tony Kanal, Tom Dumont, and produced by Spike Stent, it was released on July 16, 2012 by Interscope Records. The song is a combination of many styles, such as reggae, ska, dancehall, Latin and Caribbean-tinged beats, merging with American pop and rock music. Lyrically, the song is about confidence and about feeling good, adjusting yourself to unfamiliar circumstances.

The song received positive reviews from music critics, who praised the band for "returning to form" and for being familiar with their other songs. Some critics wrote that it resembles the songs from their fifth album Rock Steady, and particularly "Hey Baby", while some others compared it to Santigold songs.

A music video for the song was directed by Sophie Muller and released on July 16, 2012. In it, the members of No Doubt reassemble in the form of a trucking convoy, which meets up to perform the song in a parking lot. It received mostly favorable reviews, with the reviewers praising the colors, lights and the band for returning to do videos.

== Background and release ==
After the success of their fifth studio album Rock Steady (2001), in April 2003, No Doubt went into hiatus to take a break to spend time with their families before starting to compile The Singles 1992–2003, which would feature the band's greatest hits from their previous albums. The main reason to go into hiatus was that, in early 2003, their lead singer Gwen Stefani started work on her 1980s-inspired new wave/dance-pop music side project, under which she had released two solo albums at the time — Love. Angel. Music. Baby. on November 23, 2004 and The Sweet Escape on December 5, 2006. However, she and her bandmates assured fans that No Doubt remained an ongoing musical concern and confirmed that with a successful 2009 tour that carried the band to 50 North American cities.

The band began initial work on the album in March 2008, after Gwen Stefani wrapped the tour behind her second solo album, The Sweet Escape. Songwriting on the effort reportedly got off to a slow start because, according to a post from Stefani, she was distracted by her second pregnancy, though she was certain at the time that "this could be the most inspired No Doubt record so far." Energized by being back together in the studio for the first time since recording 2001's Rock Steady, the band decided to take a break from recording to hit the road for a wildly successful summer 2009 greatest-hits tour. The band reconvened at bassist Tony Kanal's personal studio in Hollywood after the tour concluded and spent the majority of 2010 writing and carefully polishing several demos. In January 2011, No Doubt guitarist Tom Dumont posted a message letting fans know that the group transitioned to the Santa Monica studio of producer Mark "Spike" Stent, who also worked on Rock Steady, to officially begin tracking the effort.

Rolling Stone visited Stent's studio and sampled several songs the band had recorded. Of the 12 tracks announced at that time, the magazine lavished particular affection on "Settle Down," calling it a "party-ready reggae blast," and "One More Summer," which "updates the band's ska-pop sound with pounding dance beats, arena-size guitars and a beyond-catchy chorus." A month after Rolling Stone's studio visit, in late July 2011, the band teamed up in the studio with Major Lazer, the recording name for hip-hop/dance producers Diplo and Switch. The group reportedly recruited the duo for a track titled "Push and Shove". At the time, drummer Adrian Young told reporters he hoped the new music would be released in the fall of 2011. However, the band chose instead to not rush the album's release and pushed the set to 2012. In April, the band announced on Twitter that the album was mixed and ready to go. In their announcement of the album's release date over the weekend, No Doubt elaborated that over the next several months, they would "shoot the video and start rehearsing to perform the new songs live for all of you."

In May, 2012, the band previewed the song "Push and Shove" in their first studio webisode back in May. Finally, on June 11, 2012, the band announced the title of the upcoming sixth studio album, "Push and Shove", and its release date, September 25. They also named the first single — "Settle Down" — and announced that it will be coming to airwaves on July 16, 2012.

== Composition and lyrics ==
"Settle Down" was written by Gwen Stefani, Tony Kanal and Tom Dumont, while production was handled by Spike Stent. It lasts for 6 minutes and 1 second, while the radio edit lasts for 3 minutes and 36 seconds. The intro to "Settle Down" is a Middle Eastern themed affair that segues into the ambient noise of a crowd of people on the street before launching into a familiar trademark electronic reggae wall of sound found on No Doubt's older jams. The song is a reggae-influenced dance jam, built over a dancehall beat, tapping into Latin and Caribbean-tinged beats, merging them with American pop and rock music. For Jason Lipshut of Billboard, "sonically, the band balances reggae flourishes with Tony Kanal's kinetic bass movements, creating a forceful continuation of their 'Rock Steady' singles. The difference between 'Settle Down' and No Doubt hits like 'Hey Baby' and 'Hella Good' is how hard the group has to work on their new cut." Nolan Feenay of Entertainment Weekly's The Music Mix wrote that the song resembles their 2001's single "Hey Baby". Jody Rosen of Rolling Stone described the beat as "Caribbean, with hints of Seventies funk and Eighties electro percolating up through the mix." Andrew Unterberger of Pop Dust described it as "a six-minute, dancehall-influenced pop/rock number, with an extended dub outro and the typical No Doubt mix of attitude, vulnerability, hooks, funk and fun." Tom Breihan of Stereogum and Marc Hogan of Spin both compared the track to the work of Santigold.

Lyrically, it finds Gwen Stefani adjusting to unfamiliar circumstances but declaring that she'll be fine, "'I'm a rough and tough/ Nothing's gonna knock this girl down.'" "What's your twenty? Where's your brain?" Gwen asks herself in the first few lines, eventually responding with the unequivocal "I'm fine / I'm hella positive, for real, I'm all good," and concluding in the chorus "But you can see it my eyes, you can read on my lips / I'm trying to get a hold on this / And I really mean it this time." The song also has the positive mental attitude that is specific to the reggae genre. For Amy Sciarretto of Pop Crush, when she sings "But you can see it my eyes, you can read on my lips / I'm trying to get a hold on this / And I really mean it this time /And you know it's such a trip / Don't get me started / I'm trying to get a hold on this," we are left to assume that Stefani is singing about her desire to finally make a commitment. She's ready, willing and able. She just wants her man to be patient and "settle down." And then she can "settle down" with him.

== Critical reception ==
The song was generally well received by most music critics. Randall Roberts of the Los Angeles Times said that, "It's a song made for summer in the Southland: big beats designed to pop out of sunroofs and rolled-down windows, to rumble the nuts and bolts of Impalas across Orange County and down Hollywood Boulevard." Popjustice said the song was "brilliant" and noted the familiar sound of No Doubt present in it, writing, "In terms of signature sound the track doesn't really mess around – this is definitely a No Doubt tune, rather than a Gwen one – but it gives the less Popjustice-friendly end of the No Doubt 'sonic' 'palette' a swerve, and by that we mean it goes easy on the ska-punk racket side of things." Lily Rothman of Time commended No Doubt for not "[messing] with their signature sound." Crystal Bell of Huffington Post said that "it has a slight reggae feel – harking back to the band's SoCal roots – but there's also a radio-friendly hook."

Jason Lipshut of Billboard wrote that "the melodies are snipped while others are shoehorned into place, and Stefani's lyrical conversation with herself sounds more exhaustively constructed than effortless." Nick Bassett from The Re-View also praised how: "'Settle Down' takes it back to No Doubt's early music-making roots, effortlessly fusing their early ska-pop vibe with catchy hooks and one brilliant chorus, manhandled perfectly by lead singer Gwen Stefani." Amy Sciarretto of Pop Crush gave the song 3.5 out of 5 stars, writing: "The verses are reggae heavy, from the horns to Stefani's accented delivery. The Jamaican-inspired choruses are more addictive than any drug you can think of. From the sounds of this, you'd be more apt to believe Stefani and co. are from the islands, as opposed to So Cal. If this song doesn't inspire you to dance, or to 'get in line and settle down,' not much else can." Andrew Unterberger of Pop Dust also gave the song 3.5 stars, writing, "It's a good song, especially for the summer and it would have been just as good a song in the summers of 2002 or 1996. It won't get the group a lot of new, young fans, but old-school fans will doubtless be appreciative." Robbie Daw of Idolator agreed, calling it "amazingly bombastic, joyous reggae-rock track, which manages to sound like No Doubt in both 2012 and 1995." Robert Copsey of Digital Spy called it "a welcome return to their signature sound; thankfully it sounds as fresh as it did in their heyday." Sal Cinquemani of Slant Magazine wrote that the song "somehow manages to be both silly and cool."

== Chart performance ==
"Settle Down" had little to moderate success on the charts. In New Zealand, the song debuted at number 36, on July 30, 2012. After the debut, the song left the charts, until it re-entered at number 36, on August 13, 2012. After falling to number 39, the song jumped to number 36 for the third time. On September 3, 2012, the song went to number 34 and peaked there.

In the United States, "Settle Down" was also a moderate success. It debuted at number 34 on the Billboard Hot 100 chart, selling 87,000 copies, which led the song to debut at number 13 on the Hot Digital Songs chart. It also debuted at number 65 on the Radio Songs chart, with 18 million impressions. However, the song dropped to number 57, on the second week inside the Hot 100 chart, becoming the "Biggest Free Faller". After falling to number 58, the song climbed to number 55. In Canada, the song proved to be more successful, debuting at number 24 on the Canadian Hot 100 chart, on August 4, 2012. The song kept falling and climbing on the chart, until it reached a peak of 23, on September 8, 2012.

== Music video ==
The official music video for the song premiered on July 16, on E! News. It was directed by Sophie Muller, who previously helmed the band's videos for "Don't Speak", "Simple Kind of Life", "Bathwater" and "Underneath It All". In the clip, each bandmate drives a distinctly decorated truck from all different parts around the globe, meeting up once again to perform a show for their family, friends and fans. There's also some moshing and some line dancing.

The band in the music video, where Gwen Stefani, Tom Dumont, Tony Kanal and Adrian Young are happily reunited.

=== Reception ===
The video received acclaim from most critics. James Montgomery of MTV News declared, "The video is a kinetic collection of brilliant hues, blinking lights and, of course, some dazzling dance moves. Directed by Sophie Muller — who's worked with the band in the past — it is a worthy successor to those clips, though it is more reminiscent of stuff like 'Hey Baby' or 'Hella Good' ... namely, it's sweaty, sexy and swaggering, not to mention a whole lot of fun. No Doubt return with another good-time, high-energy video, and really, it's all their fans could have asked for." Sophie A. Schillaci of The Hollywood Reporter says: "The video is chock full of colorful visuals, wild fashion and outrageous antics, with Stefani jumping, kicking, partying and applying lipgloss." Crystal Bell of The Huffington Post got teary-eyed over the band's first new video in a decade: "The reunion that happens a minute and a half in is particularly memorable, as Stefani, Tom Dumont, Tony Kanal and Adrian Young are happily reunited. It's a heartwarming moment that will make even the toughest rockers get a little verklempt." Spin wrote: "The well-executed clip feels like a homecoming of sorts, as the band members embrace each other, and Stefani struts around in those kinds of tank tops she once made her signature." Becky Bain of Idolator summarized, "All in all, it's great to have the gang together again!."

== Live performances ==
No Doubt performed "Settle Down" several times throughout July 2012. The track's first live performance was at the Teen Choice Awards, followed by performances on Late Night with Jimmy Fallon and Good Morning America's Summer Concert Series. For all three performances, the band wore "studded grey jeans, with black boots and jacket[s]."

== Formats and track listings ==
- CD single
1. "Settle Down" — 6:01
2. "Settle Down" (Jonas Quant Remix) — 4:33
- Digital download
1. "Settle Down" — 6:01
- Digital download (Remixes)
1. "Settle Down" (Major Lazer Remix) — 4:54
2. "Settle Down" (So Shifty Remix) — 3:52
- Digital download (Remixes)
1. "Settle Down" — 6:01
2. "Settle Down" (Jonas Quant Remix) — 4:33
3. "Settle Down" (Anthony Gorry Remix) — 7:33
4. "Settle Down" (Stephen Hilton Remix) — 6:23

== Charts ==
=== Weekly charts ===
Chart (2012)	Peak position
Australia (ARIA)	41
Austria (Ö3 Austria Top 40)	13
Belgium (Ultratip Bubbling Under Flanders)	18
Canada Hot 100 (Billboard)	23
Canada CHR/Top 40 (Billboard)	22
Canada Hot AC (Billboard)	7
France (SNEP)	163
Germany (GfK)	31
Honduras (Honduras Top 50)	44
Ireland (IRMA)	60
Japan Hot 100 (Billboard)	28
Lebanon (The Official Lebanese Top 20)	9
Netherlands (Dutch Top 40)	28
Netherlands (Single Top 100)	69
New Zealand (Recorded Music NZ)	34
Russia Airplay (Tophit)	123
Scotland Singles (OCC)	69
Slovakia Airplay (ČNS IFPI)	68
Switzerland (Schweizer Hitparade)	48
UK Singles (OCC)	85
US Billboard Hot 100	34
US Adult Contemporary (Billboard)	28
US Adult Pop Airplay (Billboard)	14
US Pop Airplay (Billboard)	19
US Hot Rock & Alternative Songs (Billboard)	19
Venezuela Top 100 (Record Report)	88

=== Year-end charts ===
Chart (2012)	Position
US Hot Rock Songs (Billboard)	99

== Release history ==
Country	Date	Format
United States	July 16, 2012	Digital download
Australia	July 17, 2012	Digital download
Brazil	July 17, 2012	Digital download
Czech Republic	July 17, 2012	Digital download
New Zealand	July 17, 2012	Digital download
Portugal	July 17, 2012	Digital download
United States	July 24, 2012	Mainstream airplay
Germany	August 17, 2012	CD single
United Kingdom	September 24, 2012	Digital download
