= 2009 Summer Tour =

2009 concert tour by No Doubt

- Tour by No Doubt
- Promotional handbill for tour
- Start date: May 2, 2009
- End date: August 12, 2009
- Legs: 1
- No. of shows: 57 in North America

No Doubt concert chronology
- Summer Tour 2004 (2004); 2009 Summer Tour (2009); Seven Night Stand (2012)

The 2009 Summer Tour was the fifth concert tour by American rock group No Doubt.

== Background ==
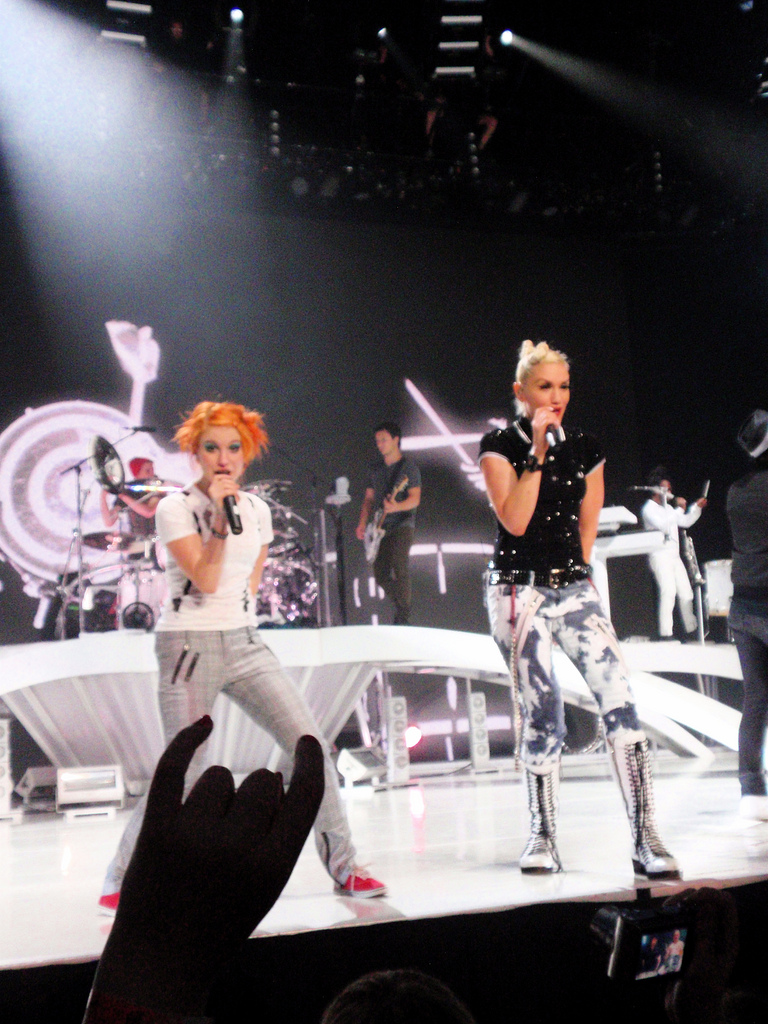
No Doubt and Paramore performing in Vancouver.

On December 3, 2008, the band announced on their official website plans of a tour and a new album. They stated,

"As most of you saw from our little iChat (yes, it was really us), we have decided to go on tour next year while continuing to work on our album. We are working on tour dates now and can't wait to get out there and play for all of you – it's been too long! We'll announce tour dates soon so be sure to check back for updates. Have a safe and happy holiday and we'll see you on the road in 2009!"

The tour was officially announced in January 2009 by MTV News. Stefani cited the reason for tour was to perform their favorite songs and explore new musical directions. A survey on the band's website complied fan's favorite songs that have a possibility of being performed on the tour. During an interview with guitarist Tom Dumont, he explained the tour will have A Clockwork Orange theme, saying,

"Gwen came up with the Clockwork Orange thing—she started getting into the visuals of those modernist movies from the 60's. We've been looking at tons of art and it's like this space-age modernism from that decade—it's retro and modern at the same time, so we're building this crazy stage set that has that vibe. We have a bunch of really great artists doing t-shirts and posters that echo that. There's a whole look for the tour even though there's not an album yet."

It was also revealed that the group will give away their entire music catalog (in digital format) to spectators who purchased high level tickets. The group appeared on The Today Show, American Idol, The Ellen DeGeneres Show, Jimmy Kimmel Live! and Gossip Girl to promote the tour. This tour should not be considered a reunion tour, because No Doubt stated it is not a reunion since the band had never broken up.

== Opening acts ==
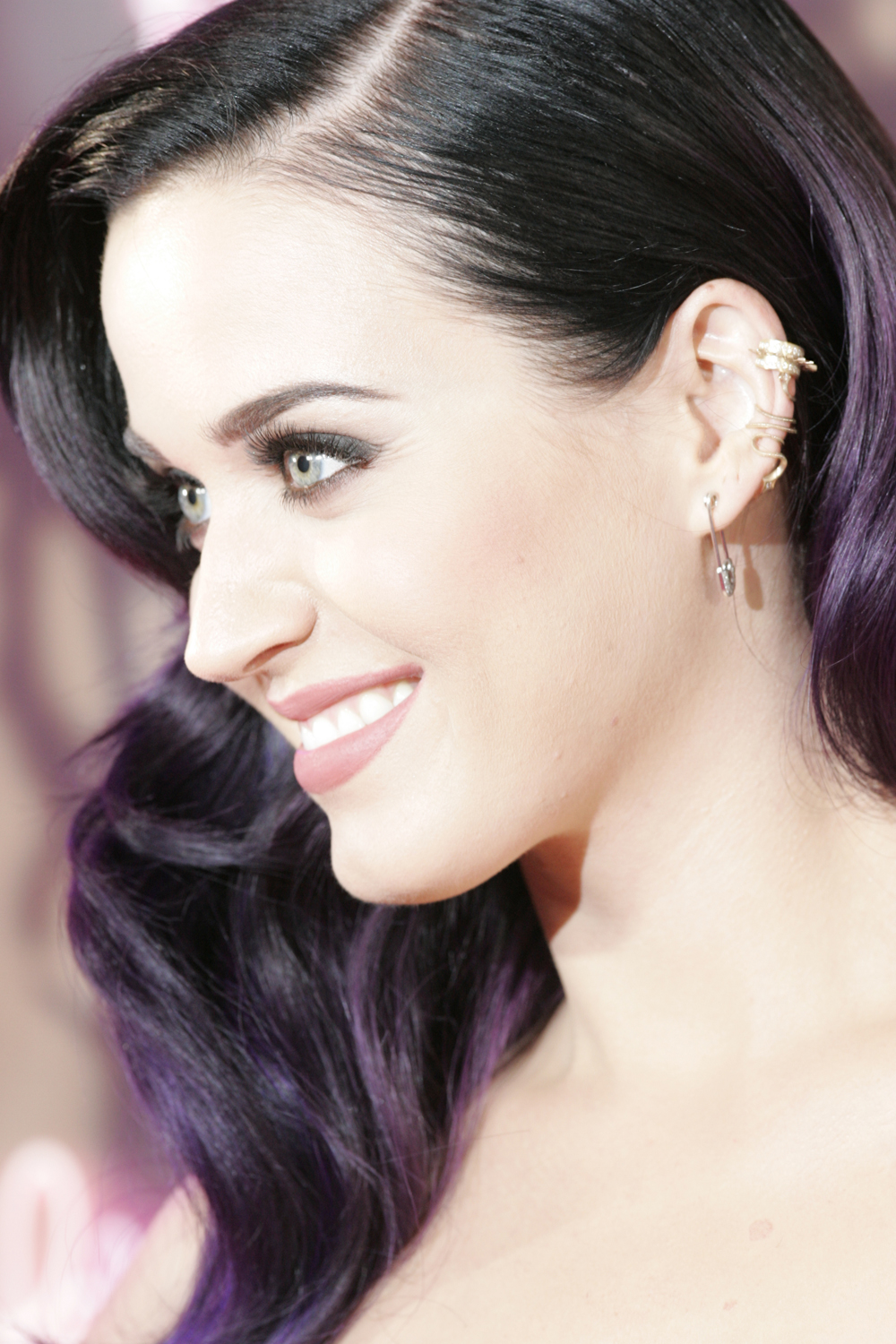
American singer Katy Perry served as an opening act

- Paramore (select dates)
- The Sounds (select dates)
- Bedouin Soundclash (select dates)
- Janelle Monáe (select dates)
- Tinted Windows (select dates)
- Katy Perry (August 4)
- Panic! at the Disco (select dates)
- Matt Costa (select dates)

== Setlist ==
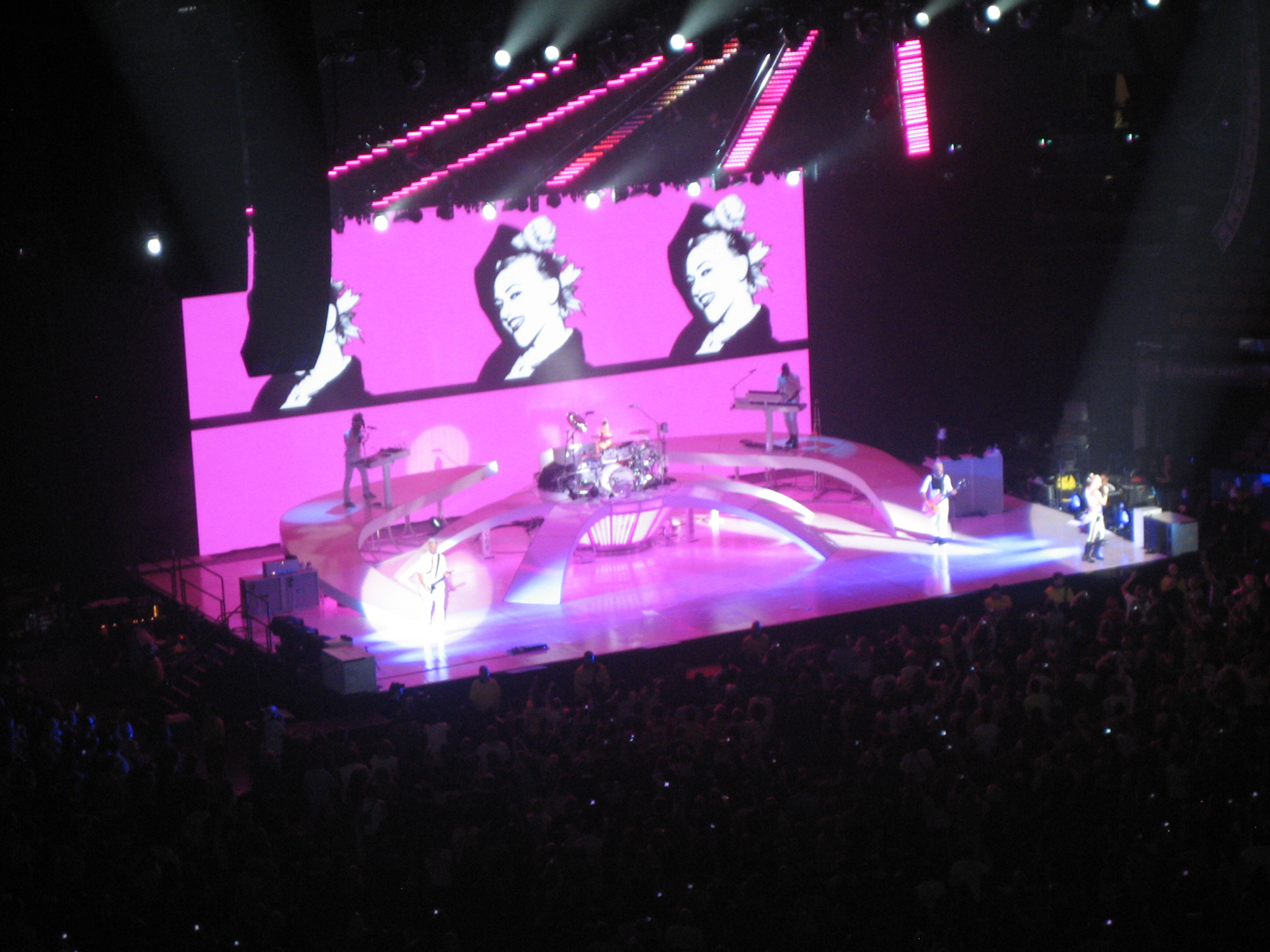
The band performing in Toronto

1. "Spiderwebs"
2. "Hella Good"
3. "Underneath It All"
4. "Excuse Me Mr."
5. "Ex-Girlfriend"
6. "End It On This"
7. "Tragic Kingdom"
8. "Squeal"
9. "Simple Kind of Life"
10. "Bathwater"
11. "Guns of Navarone"
12. "New"
13. "Hey Baby"
14. "Running"
15. "Magic's In The Makeup"
16. "Different People"
17. "Total Hate"
18. "Don't Speak"
19. "It's My Life"
20. "Just a Girl"

Encore

21. "Rock Steady"
22. "Stand and Deliver"
23. "Sunday Morning"

== Tour dates ==
Date	City	Country	Venue
North America
May 2, 2009	Atlantic City	United States	Borgata Event Center
May 3, 2009	East Rutherford	United States	Giants Stadium ^{[a]}
May 16, 2009	Paradise	United States	Mandalay Bay Events Center ^{[b]}
May 19, 2009	Fresno	United States	Save Mart Center at Fresno State
May 20, 2009	Bakersfield	United States	Rabobank Arena
May 22, 2009	Chula Vista	United States	Cricket Wireless Amphitheatre
May 23, 2009	Phoenix	United States	Cricket Wireless Pavilion
May 25, 2009	West Valley City	United States	E Center
May 27, 2009	Greenwood Village	United States	Fiddler's Green Amphitheatre
May 28, 2009	Albuquerque	United States	Journal Pavilion
May 30, 2009	Dallas	United States	SuperPages.com Center
May 31, 2009	The Woodlands	United States	Cynthia Woods Mitchell Pavilion
June 2, 2009	Tampa	United States	Ford Amphitheatre
June 3, 2009	West Palm Beach	United States	Cruzan Amphitheatre
June 5, 2009	Atlanta	United States	Lakewood Amphitheatre
June 6, 2009	Charlotte	United States	Verizon Wireless Amphitheatre
June 8, 2009	Raleigh	United States	Time Warner Cable Music Pavilion
June 10, 2009	Virginia Beach	United States	Verizon Wireless Virginia Beach Amphitheater
June 11, 2009	Camden	United States	Susquehanna Bank Center
June 13, 2009	Burgettstown	United States	Post-Gazette Pavilion
June 14, 2009	Bristow	United States	Nissan Pavilion
June 16, 2009	Toronto	Canada	Air Canada Centre
June 17, 2009	Montreal	Canada	Bell Centre
June 19, 2009	Corfu	United States	Darien Lake Performing Arts Center
June 20, 2009	Mansfield	United States	Comcast Center
June 22, 2009	Verona	United States	Turning Stone Resort & Casino
June 24, 2009	Uncasville	United States	Mohegan Sun Arena
June 26, 2009	Holmdel	United States	PNC Bank Arts Center
June 27, 2009	Wantagh	United States	Nikon at Jones Beach Theater
June 29, 2009	Cuyahoga Falls	United States	Blossom Music Center
June 30, 2009	London	Canada	John Labatt Centre
July 2, 2009	Milwaukee	United States	Marcus Amphitheater ^{[c]}
July 3, 2009	Auburn Hills	United States	The Palace of Auburn Hills
July 5, 2009	Saint Paul	United States	Xcel Energy Center
July 6, 2009	Kansas City	United States	Starlight Theatre
July 8, 2009	Maryland Heights	United States	Verizon Wireless Amphitheater
July 10, 2009	Noblesville	United States	Verizon Wireless Music Center
July 11, 2009	Tinley Park	United States	First Midwest Bank Amphitheatre
July 13, 2009	Winnipeg	Canada	MTS Centre
July 15, 2009	Calgary	Canada	Pengrowth Saddledome
July 16, 2009	Edmonton	Canada	Rexall Place
July 18, 2009	Vancouver	Canada	General Motors Place
July 19, 2009	Auburn	United States	White River Amphitheatre
July 21, 2009	Concord	United States	Sleep Train Pavilion
July 22, 2009	Los Angeles	United States	Gibson Amphitheatre
July 24, 2009	Wheatland	United States	Sleep Train Amphitheatre
July 25, 2009	Mountain View	United States	Shoreline Amphitheatre
July 27, 2009	Los Angeles	United States	Gibson Amphitheatre
July 28, 2009	Los Angeles	United States	Gibson Amphitheatre
July 31, 2009	Irvine	United States	Verizon Wireless Amphitheatre
August 1, 2009	Irvine	United States	Verizon Wireless Amphitheatre
August 2, 2009	Irvine	United States	Verizon Wireless Amphitheatre
August 4, 2009	Irvine	United States	Verizon Wireless Amphitheatre
August 5, 2009	Santa Barbara	United States	Santa Barbara Bowl
August 7, 2009	Paradise	United States	The Joint
August 8, 2009	Chula Vista	United States	Cricket Wireless Amphitheatre
August 11, 2009	Honolulu	United States	Neal S. Blaisdell Arena
August 12, 2009	Honolulu	United States	Neal S. Blaisdell Arena

a This concert is a part of the Bamboozle Festival
b This concert is a part of Tiger Jam XII
c This concert is a part of Summerfest

=== Box office score data ===
Venue	City	Tickets sold / available	Gross revenue
Mandalay Bay Events Center	Paradise	8.815 / 8.815 (100%)	$994,730
Cricket Wireless Amphitheatre	Chula Vista	19,569 / 19,569 (100%)	$751,599
E Center	West Valley City	9,641 / 9,641 (100%)	$483,909
SuperPages.com Center	Dallas	19,969 / 19,969 (100%)	$663,245
Cynthia Woods Mitchell Pavilion	The Woodlands	16,465 / 16,465 (100%)	$697,834
Time Warner Cable Music Pavilion	Raleigh	19,979 / 19,979 (100%)	$219,145
Verizon Wireless Amphitheater	Virginia Beach	20,055 / 20,055 (100%)	$347,888
Susquehanna Bank Center	Camden	24,967 / 24,967 (100%)	$616,221
Nissan Pavilion	Washington	23,381 / 23,381 (100%)	$594,953
Post-Gazette Pavilion	Pittsburgh	23,206 / 23,206 (100%)	$345,354
Air Canada Centre	Toronto	14,000 / 14,000 (100%)	$1,111,794
Bell Centre	Montreal	8,998 / 8,998 (100%)	$616,937
Comcast Center	Mansfield	17,477 / 19,300 (91%)	$789,121
John Labatt Centre	London	6,317 / 8,427 (77%)	$444,517
First Midwest Bank Amphitheatre	Tinley Park	27,060 / 28,630 (95%)	$722,231
General Motors Place	Vancouver	11,727 / 12,000 (96%)	$703,513
Sleep Tram Amphitheatre	Wheatland	18,386 / 18,386 (100%)	$602,951
Shoreline Amphitheatre	Mountain View	22,011 / 22,011 (100%)	$885,768
Pengrowth Saddledome	Calgary	10,048 / 12,524 (80%)	$698,688
Rexall Place	Edmonton	10,253 / 14.321 (72%)	$838,871
Gibson Amphitheatre	Los Angeles	18,097 / 18,097 (100%)	$1,518,390
Verizon Wireless Amphitheater	Irvine	59,763 / 59,763 (100%)	$3,736,584
The Joint	Paradise	3,327 / 3,327 (100%)	$417,902
Neal S. Blaisdell Center	Honolulu	14,219 / 14,219 (100%)	$916,697
TOTAL		437,477 / 446,729 (98%)	$18,879,971
