= No Doubt =

American rock band

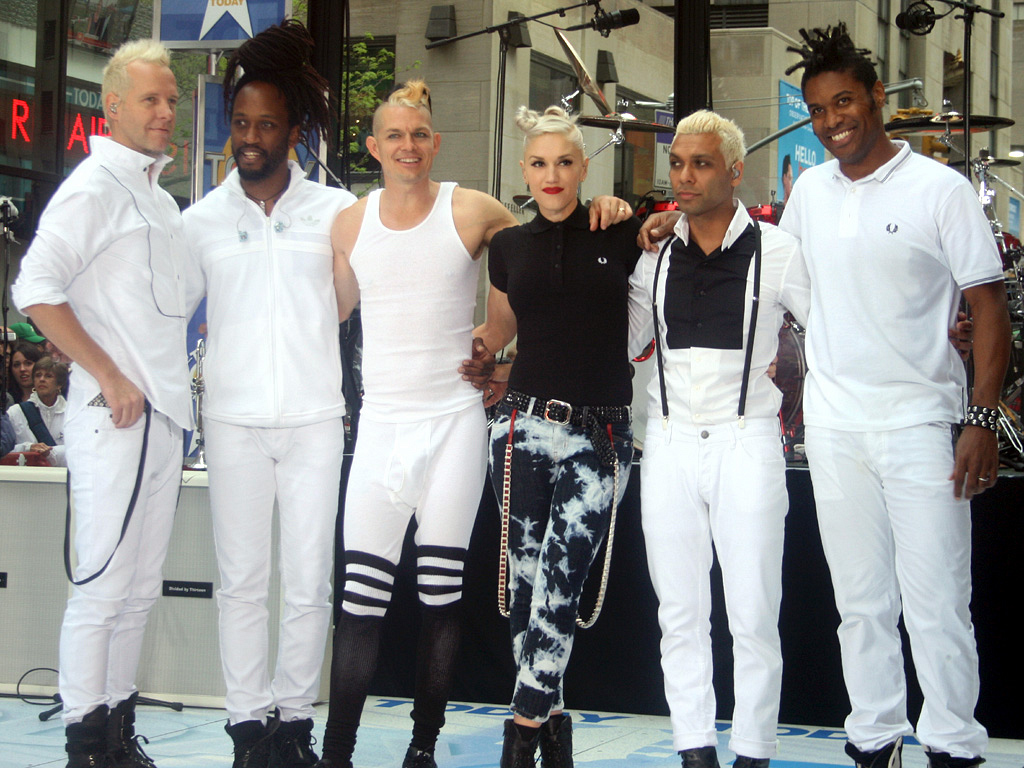
- No Doubt and its session/touring musicians on Today in 2009. From left to right: Tom Dumont, Stephen Bradley, Adrian Young, Gwen Stefani, Tony Kanal and Gabrial McNair.

Background information
- Origin: Anaheim, California, U.S.
- Genres: Ska punk; pop rock; new wave; alternative rock; pop-punk
- Works: No Doubt discography
- Years active: 1986–2004; 2008–2015; 2024–present
- Labels: Interscope; Atlantic; Beacon Street; Trauma
- Spinoffs: Dreamcar
- Members: Gwen Stefani; Tony Kanal; Tom Dumont; Adrian Young
- Past members: Chris Leal; Jerry McMahon; John Spence; Eric Stefani; Chris Webb; Alan Meade; Tony Meade; Gabriel Gonzalez
- Website: nodoubt.com

No Doubt is an American rock band formed in Anaheim, California, in 1986. For most of its career, the band has consisted of vocalist and founding member Gwen Stefani, guitarist Tom Dumont, bassist Tony Kanal and drummer Adrian Young. Keyboardist Eric Stefani, Gwen's brother, was also a founding member but quit in 1994. From the mid-1990s, trombonist Gabrial McNair and trumpeter Stephen Bradley have performed with the band as session and touring musicians.

The band's 1992 eponymous debut album failed to make an impact. Its ska punk–inspired follow-up, The Beacon Street Collection, sold over 100,000 copies in 1995, more than triple the sales of its predecessor. Their third album, Tragic Kingdom, was released later the same year and benefited from the 1990s resurgence of third-wave ska, going on to achieve diamond certification. "Don't Speak", the third single from the album, set a record when it spent 16 weeks at the number one spot on the Billboard Hot 100 Airplay chart, while "Just a Girl", co-written by Stefani, was described as "the most popular cut on the CD".

The band's next album, Return of Saturn (2000), did not match the success of their previous album, despite its Top 40 hit single "Simple Kind of Life". However, the album received critical praise and was nominated for Best Rock Album at the 43rd Grammy Awards. The following year, the band returned with the album Rock Steady (2001), which incorporated reggae and dancehall music. The album was primarily recorded in Jamaica and featured collaborations with Jamaican artists Bounty Killer, Sly and Robbie and Lady Saw. The album produced two Grammy-winning singles, "Hey Baby" and "Underneath It All"; "Hella Good" was also nominated for a Grammy award.

After a 2004 tour, the band members pursued solo projects, with Stefani releasing two successful solo albums, Love. Angel. Music. Baby. (2004) and The Sweet Escape (2006), while Tom Dumont released his own solo music project, Invincible Overlord. In 2008, the band resumed working slowly on their sixth and latest effort, titled Push and Shove (2012), and released its lead single "Settle Down". The band has sold over 33 million records worldwide.

The band announced it will reunite in 2026 for a twelve-show residency in Las Vegas.

== History ==
=== 1986–1989: Formation, early years and line-up changes ===
In 1986, Eric Stefani and John Spence met at a Dairy Queen and talked about getting a group together to play music. Stefani acquired a keyboard and gathered some players together to practice; these included himself (keyboards), his sister Gwen Stefani (backing vocals), John Spence (lead vocals), Jerry McMahon (guitar), Chris Leal (bass), Chris Webb (drums), Gabriel Gonzalez (trumpet), Alan Meade (trumpet), and Tony Meade (saxophone). They practiced in Eric's parents' garage.

Tony Kanal went to one of the band's early shows, and soon joined the band as its bassist. After initially rejecting her advances, he began dating Gwen, but they kept their relationship secret for a year, feeling that it was an unspoken rule that no one in the band date her. Paul Caseley (trombone) also joined the band in 1987. Eric Carpenter (saxophone) joined the horn section soon after. The group performed at an Orange High School backyard graduation party on June 6, 1987, with two other California ska bands. At the party, No Doubt's set included "Total Hate", "Too Much Pressure", "Danger", "Paulina", "Gangsters", and the song "No Doubt". Video clips from the party appeared on VH1's Behind the Music.

In December 1987, Spence died by suicide, several days before the band was to play a gig at The Roxy Theatre for record industry employees. No Doubt disbanded but decided to regroup after several weeks with Alan Meade taking over vocals. When Meade left the band, Gwen replaced him as lead singer, and No Doubt continued to develop a live following in California. In early 1988, Tom Dumont left Rising, a heavy metal band of which he was a member with his sister, stating that local metal bands "were into drinking, wearing Spandex" but that he wanted to focus on music. He joined No Doubt and replaced Jerry McMahon as the band's guitarist. Adrian Young replaced Chris Webb as their drummer the following year. During this time period, No Doubt played gigs at local colleges, Fender's Grand Ballroom, The Whisky, The Roxy, many shows with The Untouchables, Fishbone, and a show with the Red Hot Chili Peppers at Cal State Long Beach. Caseley left No Doubt in July 1989 for the US Navy Band.

=== 1990–1992: Self-titled debut album ===
Impressed by the presence of stage diving fans at No Doubt's concerts and Gwen's on-stage presence, Tony Ferguson signed the band to a multi-album deal with the newly created Interscope Records in 1990. No Doubt's self-titled debut album was released in 1992, but it featured no radio singles, although a video was made for "Trapped in a Box". Owing to the music world's direct focus on grunge, No Doubt's album was not supported by the record label, and was considered a commercial failure for selling only 30,000 copies. The band embarked on a national tour in support of the album, though Interscope refused to support the tour. The band failed to bring the audiences that it had attracted in southern California, and often found that No Doubt was not even available in the cities where they were playing. Eric Stefani began to withdraw from the group, vacillating between being in and out of the band, while Gonzalez left the band in 1992.

=== 1993–1997: Reorganization and career breakthrough ===
The band began work on its next album the next year, but Interscope rejected much of its material, and the band was paired with producer Matthew Wilder. Eric did not like to relinquish creative control to someone outside the band and eventually stopped recording and rehearsing. He left No Doubt in 1994 to resume an animation career with the cartoon TV series The Simpsons. Kanal then ended his seven-year relationship with Gwen, saying that he needed "space". Unsure of what to do with the band, Interscope sublicensed the project to Trauma Records in 1993. No Doubt released The Beacon Street Collection, consisting of outtakes from its previous recording sessions, in 1995 on its own label, Beacon Street Records. Mixing 1980s punk rock and some grunge influences into the band's sound, the album contains a rawer sound than No Doubt, and it sold more than three times as many copies as its predecessor. Later that year, Trauma Records released Tragic Kingdom, much of which dealt with the relationship between Tony Kanal and Gwen Stefani.

The release of 1995's Tragic Kingdom and the single "Just a Girl" allowed the group to achieve mainstream commercial success. No Doubt began touring in support of the album late that year, and it grew into a 27-month international tour. In 1996, the second single, "Spiderwebs", was successful, and "Don't Speak", a ballad written by Gwen and Eric Stefani about Gwen and Kanal's break-up, was released as the third single and broke the previous record when it topped the Billboard Hot 100 Airplay for sixteen non-consecutive weeks. No Doubt was nominated for two Grammy Awards for Best New Artist and Best Rock Album at the 1997 Grammy Awards. By the end of the year, half of the songs on Tragic Kingdom had been released as singles, and the album was certified eight times platinum. Later, they were nominated for two more Grammys for Song of the Year and Best Pop Performance by a Duo or Group with Vocal, both for "Don't Speak". The Recording Industry Association of America certified the album diamond in February 1999, and with worldwide sales of sixteen million. Through the success of Tragic Kingdom, the band's self-titled debut album began again to sell copies, and reached total sales of over a quarter of a million copies.

The album's release fueled a dispute between Trauma and Interscope Records over No Doubt's recording contract. Trauma sued for US$100 million for breach of contract, fraud, and extortion and sought to have its joint venture agreement ended, claiming that Interscope had reneged on its contract after the band had become more successful than expected. No Doubt had previously stated that it had switched to Trauma Records and that the transition was "really great...because now we have the attention and the focus of a small indie label." The case was settled out of court with a $3 million payment.

=== 1998–2003: Continued touring and new albums ===
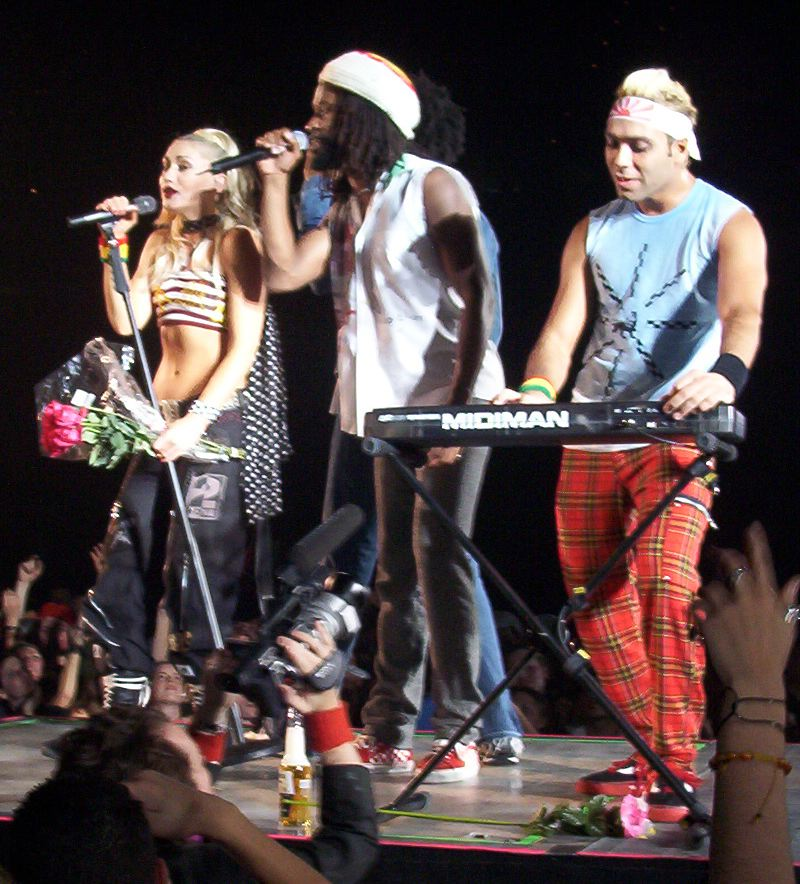
No Doubt performing in 2002

The band finished its tour in December 1997 and had several releases during the two-year writing process to make its follow-up to Tragic Kingdom. Live in the Tragic Kingdom, a live long-form video of the band's performance at the Arrowhead Pond of Anaheim, was released and The Beacon Street Collection was re-released while the band was on tour that year. The band recorded "I Throw My Toys Around" with Elvis Costello for The Rugrats Movie, and it contributed to The Clash's tribute album Burning London: The Clash Tribute. Stefani began to make recordings without the band, contributing vocals to tracks for The Brian Setzer Orchestra, Prince, Fishbone, and Familyhood Nextperience, and her boyfriend Gavin Rossdale's band Bush. After some time in-between albums, No Doubt included its song "New" on the soundtrack to the movie Go in 1999. "New", inspired by Gwen's budding relationship with Rossdale, was one of the first songs written after the release of Tragic Kingdom.

In 2000, the band released Return of Saturn, its follow-up to Tragic Kingdom. The album featured a darker tone and was more lyrically advanced than No Doubt's previous work. The main lyrical focus of the new record had shifted from Gwen Stefani's relationship with bassist Tony Kanal to her new relationship with Gavin Rossdale. Return of Saturn was critically acclaimed, but was not as commercially successful as their previous album, and the lead single, "Ex-Girlfriend", failed to chart on the Billboard Hot 100 in the United States. Also released as singles from the album were the tracks "Simple Kind of Life" and "Bathwater". Lukewarm sales drastically shortened the tour that followed, appearing only in festival settings in L.A., Cincinnati, Nashville, Jacksonville and Miami. On August 10, No Doubt went on VH1 Storytellers and performed a few of their songs, and were joined by friend Alain Johannes (of Eleven) and former member Eric Stefani.

After Return of Saturn, the band returned to recording in January 2001. During this time, it contributed a cover version of Donna Summer's "Love to Love You Baby" for the Zoolander soundtrack and recorded a song with Kelis for her album Wanderland. Stefani made high-profile appearances on Moby's "South Side" and Eve's "Let Me Blow Ya Mind". These appearances lent No Doubt credibility and an opportunity to explore new genres. Highly influenced by Jamaican dancehall music and recorded primarily in Jamaica, the band's 2001 studio album, Rock Steady, produced two hit Grammy-winning singles, "Hey Baby", which featured Bounty Killer, and "Underneath It All", which featured "the first lady of dancehall", Lady Saw. Both singles managed to reach the top five on the Billboard Hot 100. The album also released "Hella Good" and "Running" as singles. In addition, pop-star Prince co-wrote, produced, and performed on "Waiting Room" from Rock Steady. Stefani had previously provided vocals for a song on Prince's Rave Un2 the Joy Fantastic album, "So Far, So Pleased". In November 2002, No Doubt made an appearance in the Dawson's Creek episode "Spiderwebs".

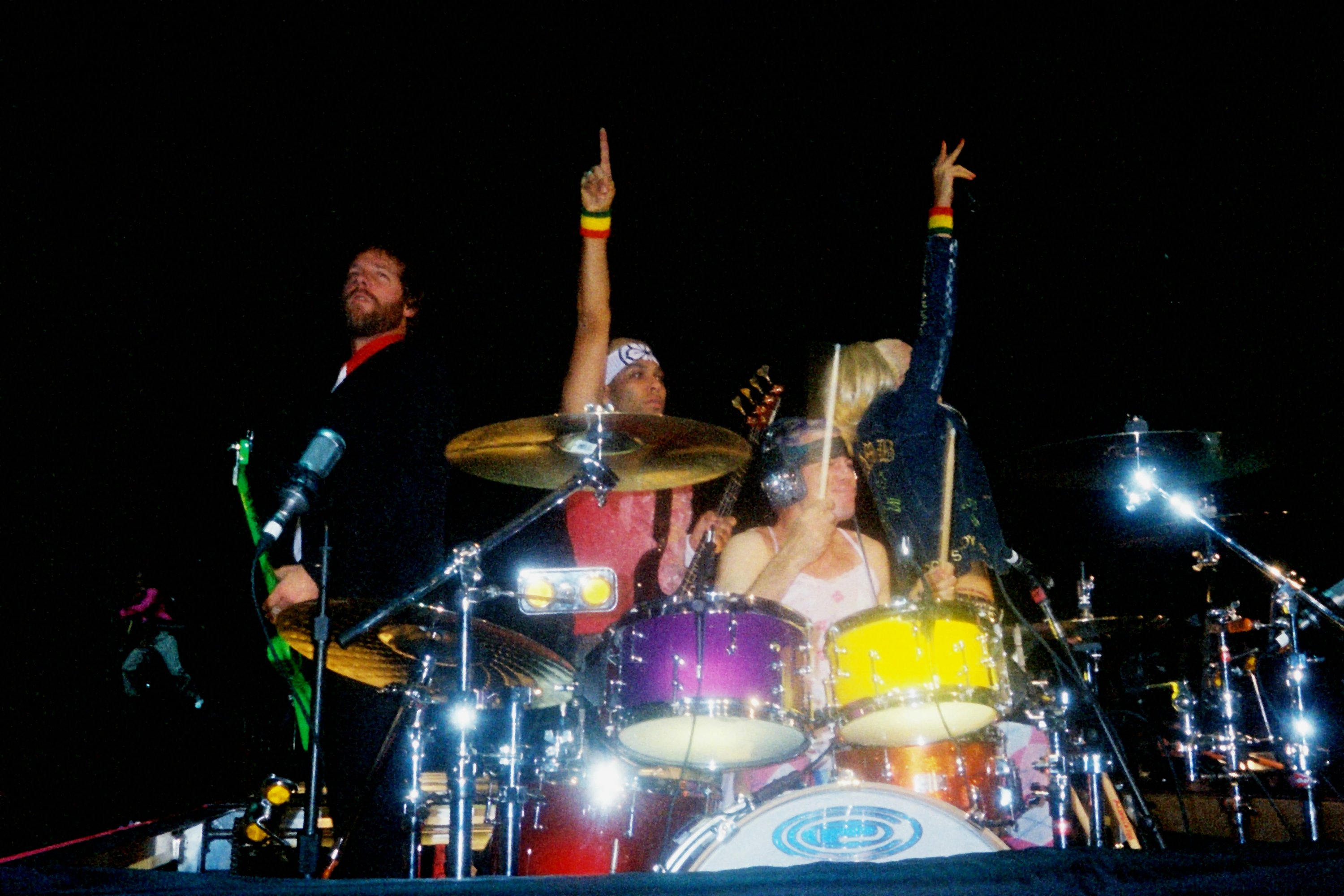
No Doubt performing in 2002

On November 22, 2002, No Doubt received the Key to the City of Anaheim, given by the Mayor of Anaheim, Tom Daly, in Disneyland during the band's appearance on (KROQ-FM) where they performed five songs. In January 2003, No Doubt performed in the Super Bowl XXXVII halftime show.

=== 2003–2008: Greatest Hits and hiatus ===
The album The Singles 1992–2003, a compilation of the band's commercially released singles, was released on November 25, 2003. It included a cover of the song "It's My Life", which had originally been a hit for synthpop group Talk Talk in 1984, and earned No Doubt a Grammy nomination for Pop Performance by a Duo or Group With Vocal. Additionally, a special 2-CD 2-DVD box set titled Boom Box was made available, which included the CDs The Singles 1992–2003 and Everything in Time and the DVDs The Videos 1992–2003 and Live in the Tragic Kingdom. Separately, Rock Steady Live, a DVD of the band performing in Long Beach from their Rock Steady tour was released in 2003 as well. The next year, the band was featured in a re-recording of the Toots and the Maytals classic song "Monkey Man" for the Grammy Award winning True Love. The band also toured with Blink-182 in mid-2004, before embarking on a hiatus.

Lead singer Gwen Stefani began work on her 1980s-inspired new wave and dance-pop side project in 2003, which eventually evolved into the full-fledged solo album Love. Angel. Music. Baby., released on November 23, 2004. The album reached multi-platinum status in several countries, including a quintuple platinum certification in Canada and triple platinum in the US.

No Doubt was featured on the album True Love by Toots and the Maytals, which won the Grammy Award in 2004 for Best Reggae Album, and showcased many notable musicians including Willie Nelson, Eric Clapton, Jeff Beck, Trey Anastasio, Ben Harper, Bonnie Raitt, Manu Chao, The Roots, Ryan Adams, Keith Richards, Toots Hibbert, Paul Douglas, Jackie Jackson, Ken Boothe, and The Skatalites.

Stefani launched her first solo arena tour in October 2005, which coincided with the news of her pregnancy (her son, Kingston James McGregor Rossdale, was born on May 26, 2006). She released her second solo dance-pop album, The Sweet Escape in December 2006. Tony Kanal helped with the production of the album as well.

In early 2005, Tom Dumont released his own solo music project, Invincible Overlord, with friend and collaborator Ted Matson, and backed up Matt Costa on his 2005 tour. Adrian Young, the band's drummer, did the drums for Bow Wow Wow's 2004 tour and many of the tracks on Unwritten Law's 2005 release Here's to the Mourning, as well as featuring on several shows in 2006 for TheStart. Young also played on Rock Star: Supernova runner-up Dilana's Inside Out album.

In 2008, Tony Kanal collaborated with pop rock artist Pink on the album Funhouse. Kanal co-produced "Sober", co-wrote "Funhouse" and also sang back-up vocals on "Crystal Ball".

=== 2008–2013: First reunion and comeback tour ===
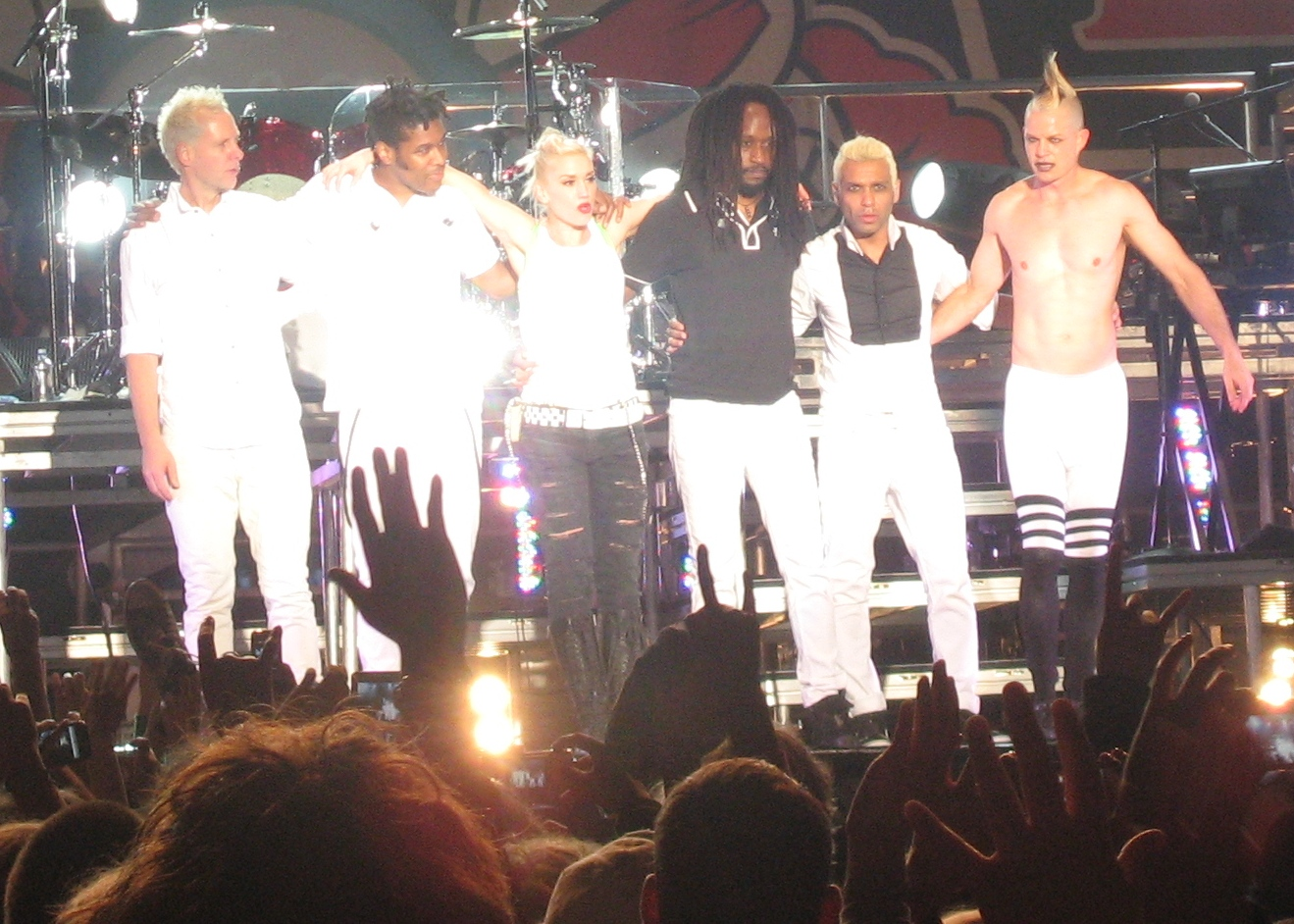
No Doubt performing on the 2009 Summer Tour

With Stefani promoting her second solo album, No Doubt began initial work on a new album without her and planned to complete it after Stefani's tour was finished. However, songwriting was slow as Gwen Stefani was, at the time, pregnant with her second child. The album was produced by Mark "Spike" Stent, who helped produce and mix Rock Steady.

No Doubt announced on their official website that they would tour in the summer of 2009 with Paramore, The Sounds, Janelle Monáe, Bedouin Soundclash, Katy Perry, Panic! at the Disco, and Matt Costa, all while finishing their upcoming album, which was set for release in 2010. As a special promotion for the tour, the band was giving away their entire music catalog free as a digital download with purchase of top-tier seating.

The band released another compilation album on November 2 called Icon, in preparation for their upcoming comeback album. Icon featured the same track listing as their previous compilation album The Singles 1992–2003 albeit with new artwork and a low price point.

On June 11, 2012, the band announced on their official website that the new album would be out on September 25, preceded by the first single on July 16. The album was titled Push and Shove and the first single was a song called "Settle Down". The music video for "Settle Down" was directed by Sophie Muller (who has previously directed numerous music videos for No Doubt). "Settle Down" peaked at No. 34 on the Billboard Hot 100 with the album peaking at No. 3. On November 3, 2012, the band pulled its music video "Looking Hot" from the Internet after receiving complaints that it was insensitive towards Native Americans.

As of February 1, 2013, the band stated via Twitter that they had "Finished a week of songwriting", implying that they have more new tracks written. As of February 26, 2013, the band officially confirmed through their website that they had indeed begun working on new music as well as plans for an upcoming tour.

=== 2013–2015: Second hiatus and disbandment ===
In October 2013, Tom Dumont revealed via Twitter that the band was once again on hiatus, but hinted that they would regroup in 2014. No Doubt did reform for sporadic live performances during 2014 and 2015, among others at Global Citizen Earth Day Concert, Rock in Rio USA, Riot Fest, and KAABOO in Del Mar, California, but did not announce a headline tour or release any new music. Around the release of her solo single "Baby Don't Lie", Gwen Stefani announced that No Doubt were working on a new album. However, during an interview with the Orange County Register in April 2015, Tony Kanal stated that the band was not working on any new material.

In a June 2016 interview with Rolling Stone, Stefani expressed uncertainty over the future of No Doubt. "I don't know what's going to happen with No Doubt. When Tony [Kanal] and I are connected creatively, it's magic. But I think we've grown apart as far as what kind of music we want to make. I was really drained and burned out when we recorded [2012's Push and Shove]. And I had a lot of guilt: 'I have to do it.' That's not the right setting to make music. There's some really great writing on that record. But the production felt really conflicted. It was sad how we all waited that long to put something out and it didn't get heard." Later that year, the other members of No Doubt formed a new band Dreamcar with AFI singer Davey Havok, releasing their debut album in 2017.

=== 2022–present: Second reunion, Coachella and future ===
In an interview with WSJ Magazine in December 2022, when asked about a reunion, Stefani said "What are the odds of anything? I was just on The Drew Barrymore Show. She was one of my favorite celebrities when I was a little girl, and now I was just on the show with her. Anything can happen. We haven't really talked about doing anything, but it feels like everyone is, right? All the '90s people—Blink-182 did an eight-month tour that sold out in like five minutes." However, when Nic Harcourt interviewed Adrian Young for AKG's Stories Behind the Sessions (published in May 2023) and asked him if the world would see any more No Doubt music, Young replied: "I don't think so. I think [Push and Shove] will remain our last album. And unfortunately, I don't see us touring anymore either. I could be wrong, you never know, things could change. I would love to have that feeling again, connect with the fans, and it's quite a shame we're not playing live."

On January 16, 2024, the band teased a reunion show. On February 2, a source close to the band revealed to Us Weekly that "the whole group has some ideas for new material and are open to a tour directly after [their] performance." They played a reunion show in April 2024, performing at Coachella, the first time they played together since 2015. On January 30, 2025, No Doubt performed another reunion show initially planned as a Gwen Stefani solo concert to support the aid and fundraising in response to the January 2025 Southern California wildfires.

On October 9, 2025, it was reported by TMZ that No Doubt would be headlining a Las Vegas residency, playing six dates at the Sphere in May 2026 (which would be extended into June 2026, making a total of 18 dates), making Stefani the first woman to headline the arena.

== Musical style and influences ==
No Doubt's musical style has been characterized as ska punk, ska, pop rock, new wave, alternative rock, pop-punk, reggae, reggae fusion, and punk rock. Some other genres the band has been described as include synth-pop, electropop, dancehall, third-wave ska, post-grunge, funk, and disco.

The band's debut album blended the ska punk, alternative rock and new wave genres. However, the band utilized a punk rock sound in their second album The Beacon Street Collection and their third album Tragic Kingdom, although the latter incorporated pop-punk and alternative rock influences. They later shed their punk rock roots for the following album Return of Saturn, utilizing influences from new wave music and pop rock.

The band completely altered their sound in their next album Rock Steady, incorporating Jamaican music influences from reggae fusion, rocksteady and dance-rock. However the band's comeback album Push and Shove blended pop rock, new wave music and dancehall; the English electronic bands New Order and Orchestral Manoeuvres in the Dark (OMD) were cited as key influences on the album.

== Other appearances ==
In 2009, No Doubt made an appearance on the television series Gossip Girl, playing a fictional band called "Snowed Out" in the episode "Valley Girls". They performed a cover version of the Adam and the Ants song "Stand and Deliver".

No Doubt played at the Bridge School Benefit organized by Neil Young on October 24 and 25, 2009, at the Shoreline Amphitheatre in Mountain View, California.

On December 5, 2010, No Doubt performed a tribute to Paul McCartney at The Kennedy Center Honors, playing a medley of Beatles hits including "Hello, Goodbye", "All My Loving", and "Penny Lane". The band performed for President Barack Obama, Sir Paul McCartney, and Oprah Winfrey.

The band also appeared as guests on the Fox animated television series King of the Hill, in the season 5 episode "Kidney Boy and Hamster Girl: A Love Story", and in an episode of the sketch comedy program Portlandia. They can also be seen in a scene of the Simpsons episode "Homerpalooza". At the time Eric Stefani was one of the show's animators, and inserted his sister and her bandmates behind Homer in the scene where the crowd riots against him.

== Band Hero lawsuit ==
On November 4, 2009, the Los Angeles Times reported that No Doubt had filed a lawsuit over its portrayal in the music video game Band Hero. The lawsuit alleged that the game had "transformed No Doubt band members into a virtual karaoke circus act", singing dozens of songs the group neither wrote, popularized, nor approved for use in the game. The case was filed in Los Angeles Superior Court and cited Activision, the game's distributor, as having exceeded contractual likenesses of the members of No Doubt.

On February 15, 2011, the California Court of Appeal for the Second Appellate District affirmed the trial court's denial of Activision's special motion to strike No Doubt's lawsuit as a strategic lawsuit against public participation, after an interlocutory appeal by Activision. The appellate court explained that the dispute arose from No Doubt's discovery, two weeks before Band Hero went on sale, that its band members could be manipulated in the game to perform songs they would never perform in real life. The court then explained: "The band also learned that female lead singer Gwen Stefani's avatar could be made to sing in a male voice, and the male band members' avatars could be manipulated to sing songs in female voices. The individual band member avatars could be made to perform solo, without their band members, as well as with members of other groups." The court then ruled that Activision's First Amendment defense was meritless, No Doubt had a reasonable probability of prevailing on the merits, and that No Doubt was entitled to recover costs and attorney's fees incurred in opposing Activision's appeal.

In 2012, the issue was settled out of court, two weeks before scheduled trial date.

== Band members ==
Current members

- Gwen Stefani – lead vocals (1988–2004, 2008–2015, 2024–present); backing vocals (1986–1988)
- Tony Kanal – bass (1987–2004, 2008–2015, 2024–present); keyboards (2001–2004, 2008–2015, 2024–present); saxophone (2001)
- Tom Dumont – guitars (1988–2004, 2008–2015, 2024–present); keyboards (2001–2004, 2008–2015, 2024–present)
- Adrian Young – drums, percussion (1989–2004, 2008–2015, 2024–present)

Current session/touring musicians

- Gabrial McNair – trombone, backing vocals (1993–2004, 2008–2015, 2024–present); keyboards, percussion (1995–2004, 2008–2015, 2024–present), additional guitars (2008–2015, 2024–present)
- Stephen Bradley – trumpet, backing vocals (1995–2004, 2008–2015, 2024–present); keyboards, percussion (2000–2004, 2008–2015, 2024–present)

Former members

- Eric Stefani – keyboards, piano, backing vocals (1986–1995)
- Gabriel Gonzalez – trumpet (1986–1992; died 2024)
- Chris Webb – drums, percussion (1986–1989)
- John Spence – lead vocals (1986–1987; died 1987)
- Alan Meade – trumpet, backing vocals (1986–1987); lead vocals (1987–1988)
- Tony Meade – saxophone (1986–1988)
- Jerry McMahon – guitars (1986–1988)
- Chris Leal – bass (1986–1987)

Former session/touring musicians

- Kevin Wells – trombone (1986–1987)
- Kirk Hofstetter – bass (1987)
- Paul Caseley – trombone (1987–1989)
- Eric Carpenter – saxophone (1988–1994)
- Phil Jordan – trumpet (1990–1994, 2006)

== Discography ==
Studio albums

- No Doubt (1992)
- The Beacon Street Collection (1995)
- Tragic Kingdom (1995)
- Return of Saturn (2000)
- Rock Steady (2001)
- Push and Shove (2012)

== Tours and concerts ==
Concert tours

- Trapped in a Box Tour (1992)
- Tragic Kingdom World Tour (1997)
- Return of Saturn Tour (2000)
- Rock Steady Tour (2002)
- Blink-182 / No Doubt Summer Tour 2004 (2004)
- Summer Tour 2009 (2009)

Residencies

- Seven Night Stand (2012)
- Live at Sphere (2026)
