= Invincible Overlord =

American band

- Genres: Alternative rock, ambient
- Years active: 2003-present
- Label: Venerable Media
- Members: Tom Dumont; Ted Matson
- Website: InvincibleOverlord.com

Invincible Overlord is a side-project band by Tom Dumont (No Doubt) and Ted Matson. The duo was formed after No Doubt's vocalist, Gwen Stefani, decided to pursue a solo career, and the other members began starting families. Invincible Overlord's only album, The Living Album, is available as a free download on the band's website . The album's first five tracks were released in May 2005: "Through the Years", "Powercell", "My Light Is as Bright as the Sun", "Maryland", and "Behind the Mountains". Two new songs were added in January 2006 and August 2007, "You Are Alone" and "Everything Will Be Fine", respectively. As stated on the website, more pieces will be added as they are completed.

Invincible Overlord remixed No Doubt's single "Bathwater" in 2004 in promotion for the No Doubt best-of, The Singles 1992-2003, and created "I Become the Sky" for the soundtrack to The Providence Effect (2009).

== Discography ==
=== Studio albums ===
Title	Album details	Track listing
The Living Album	Released: May 2005; Label: Venerable Media; Format: Digital download · streaming	1. "Through the Years"; 2. "Powercell"; 3. "My Light Is as Bright as the Sun"; 4. "Maryland"; 5. "Behind the Mountains"; 6. "You Are Alone"; 7. "Everything Will Be Fine"

=== Single ===
List of singles as lead artist, with selected chart positions and album name
Title	Year	Peak chart positions				Album
Title	Year	AUS	ITA	RUS	SWI	Album
"Bathwater (Invincible Overlord Remix)" (No Doubt)	2004	61	31	101	42	Non-album single

=== Guest appearances ===
List of non-single guest appearances, showing year released and album name
Title	Year	Album
"Not by Force"	2005	Non-album song
"I Become the Sky"	2009	The Providence Effect

== See also ==
- No Doubt
- Tom Dumont
