= Push and Shove (album) =

Studio album by No Doubt
- Released: September 21, 2012
- Recorded: January 4, 2011 – July 13, 2012
- Studios: Kingsbury (Los Feliz, California) (Note: Tracks 1–4, 6, 7, 10 and 11); Henson (Hollywood, California) (Note: Tracks 1, 3, 5, 7 and 10); Mixsuite LA (Santa Monica, California) (Note: Tracks 1–11); The Nook (Studio City, California) (Note: Tracks 1 and 11); The Sideshack (Long Beach, California) (Note: Track 2); Kingston Sound (Los Angeles, California) (Note: Tracks 2, 3, 5, 8, 10 and 11); The Pass (Los Angeles, California) (Note: Tracks 3 and 10); Record One (Sherman Oaks, California) (Note: Tracks 3, 4, 6, 7, 9 and 10); Mad Decent (Atwater Village, California) (Note: Track 4); Heavy Duty (Burbank, California); Penthouse (Kingston, Jamaica); Paramount (Hollywood, California) (Note: "Stand and Deliver"); Chalice (Hollywood, California)
- Genres: Ska; dancehall; electropop; pop
- Length: 51:50
- Label: Interscope
- Producers: Anthony Gorry; Major Lazer; No Doubt; Ariel Rechtshaid; Mark "Spike" Stent

No Doubt chronology
Everything in Time (2004)	Push and Shove (2012)	The Set List (2024)

Singles from Push and Shove
- 1. "Settle Down" Released: July 16, 2012; 2. "Looking Hot" Released: November 6, 2012

Push and Shove is the sixth studio album by American rock band No Doubt. It was released on September 21, 2012, by Interscope Records. The album serves as a comeback album for the band, as their last album, Rock Steady, was released 11 years prior. A deluxe edition of Push and Shove features acoustic versions and remixes of several tracks, as well as "Stand and Deliver", a song No Doubt had covered in 2009.

The album debuted at number three on the Billboard 200 with 115,000 copies sold in its first week. "Settle Down" was released in July 2012 as the album's lead single, debuting and peaking at number 34 on the Billboard Hot 100. The album's title track features Major Lazer and Jamaican reggae artist Busy Signal, and was released as a promotional single the following month. "Looking Hot" was released as the second single from the album.

== Background and development ==
No Doubt released their fifth studio album, Rock Steady, in December 2001. The album has sold three million copies worldwide and has been certified double platinum by the Recording Industry Association of America (RIAA). In April 2003, No Doubt went into hiatus to take a break to spend time with their families before starting to compile Everything in Time; The Singles 1992–2003, a greatest hits album featuring songs from their previous studio albums; and Boom Box, a box set compiling The Singles 1992–2003, Everything in Time, The Videos 1992–2003 and Live in the Tragic Kingdom, which would all be released on the same date. The main reason to go into hiatus was that in early 2003, lead singer Gwen Stefani started work on her 1980s-inspired new wave/dance-pop music side project, under which she released two solo albums: Love. Angel. Music. Baby. (2004) and The Sweet Escape (2006).

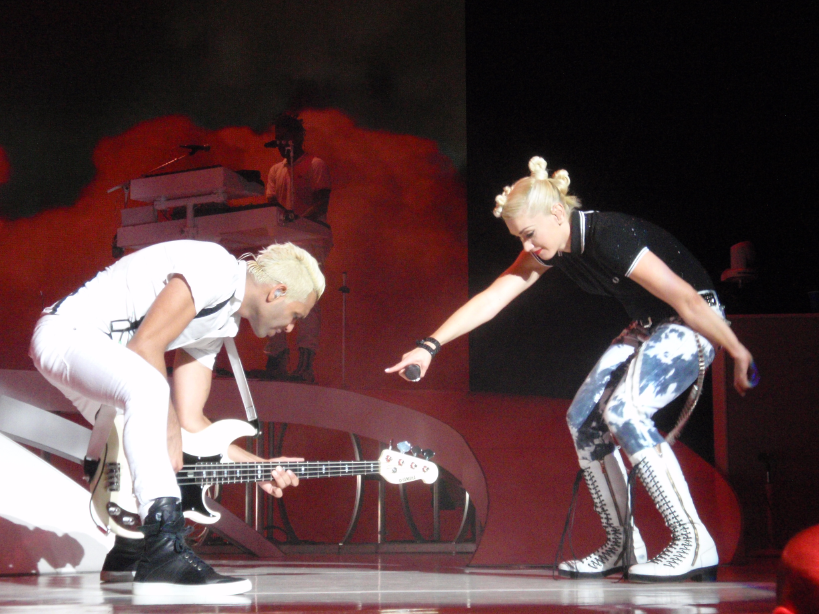
Kanal and Stefani performing during the No Doubt 2009 Summer Tour

While Stefani was promoting The Sweet Escape, the other band members began initial work on a new album without her and planned to complete it after Stefani finished her The Sweet Escape Tour. Stefani revealed in March 2008 that the songwriting process for the album had begun, but was being done relatively slow on her end because she was, at the time, pregnant with her second child. The band's manager Jim Guerinot announced that the album would be produced by Mark "Spike" Stent, who helped produce and mix Rock Steady. However, the sessions stalled as the band suffered from writer's block, and they decided to return to touring. Through their website, No Doubt announced their 2009 Summer Tour with opening acts Paramore, The Sounds, Janelle Monáe, Bedouin Soundclash, Katy Perry, Panic! at the Disco, and Matt Costa, all while finishing their upcoming album, which was set for release in 2010. As a special promotion for the tour, the band was giving away their entire music catalog as a free digital download with purchase of top-tier seating.

== Recording ==
When the band finally began to slowly write songs, they became anxious to start recording them. The group entered the studio in May 2010 to begin recording Push and Shove, and Stefani stated publicly that she wanted to complete the project by the end of the year. On January 4, 2011, Tom Dumont posted on the band's official website that they had spent most of 2010 writing and making demos, and that the "real" recording sessions had begun that same day. The process was very informal, with Stefani jokingly describing it as "a series of accidents and mistakes." The band embraced their usual ska influences, while also drawing inspiration from British new wave acts such as Depeche Mode, the Cure and OMD.

== Release and promotion ==
No Doubt announced on May 4, 2012, that their then-untitled sixth studio would be released on September 25, 2012. A month later, the band announced the album's title to be Push and Shove. "Push and Shove" was released as a promotional single for the album on August 29, 2012. A limited edition of 2500 (individually numbered) Speaker Box sets and a deluxe edition were also released at the same time. The deluxe edition contains four additional tracks and a hardbound 24-page booklet which includes information on the birth of the concept for the "Settle Down" video as well as Lance Slaton's concept artwork for the video. The Speaker Box set contains three bonus tracks for a total of 14 tracks along with a slew of other items in a "hand assembled" working audio speaker box with a standard mini-jack connection. The items included were a custom 4GB flash drive containing album audio in WAV and MP3 formats with digital booklet, the hardbound 24 page booklet with CD, a pearlized guitar pick featuring black foil stamping including facsimile printed band signatures, commemorative laminate with printed lanyard (collector's item – no backstage access), a fold-out poster, accordion fold five-postcard set, vinyl sticker all in a custom-cut charcoal foam contents tray.

The cover artwork for the album was created by graffiti artist Miles "Mac" MacGregor ("El Mac") based on a photo shoot he had taken of the band.

=== Singles ===
"Settle Down", the album's lead single, debuted on July 16, 2012. The music video, which was shot over the week of June 11, 2012, was directed by Sophie Muller, who had previously directed many of No Doubt's music videos including "Don't Speak" and "Underneath It All". They released a behind-the-scenes video of the set of "Settle Down" on June 30, 2012. No Doubt performed the song live for the first time during the 2012 Teen Choice Awards on July 22. They also performed the song on Late Night with Jimmy Fallon on July 26 and on Good Morning America on July 27.

"Looking Hot" was released as the official second single from Push and Shove. The song was sent to contemporary hit radio in the United States on November 6, 2012. The band performed the song on The X Factor UK on November 4, 2012. One day after the premiere of the "Looking Hot" official music video, No Doubt announced on their website on November 3 that they had decided to pull down the video due to its possible offensive nature to Native Americans, despite their efforts to include expert input on Native American culture.

== Critical reception ==
Professional ratings
Aggregate scores
Source	Rating
Metacritic	61/100
Review scores
Source	Rating
AllMusic	3.5/5 stars
The Daily Telegraph	3/5 stars
Entertainment Weekly	B+
The Guardian	3/5 stars
The Independent	3/5 stars
Los Angeles Times	3/4 stars
Paste	6.7/10
PopMatters	4/10
Rolling Stone	3/5 stars
Slant Magazine	3.5/5 stars
Spin	7/10

Push and Shove received generally positive reviews from music critics. At Metacritic, which assigns a normalized rating out of 100 to reviews from mainstream publications, the album received an average score of 61, based on 23 reviews. Stephen Thomas Erlewine of AllMusic compared the album favorably to Stefani's solo albums, calling it "a modest, mature comeback, highlighted by the band's keen awareness of their strengths and subtle, unstated acknowledgment of encroaching middle age." Entertainment Weekly's Melissa Maerz commented that on Push and Shove, Stefani "pogos as hard as she did in her Anaheim-strip-mall ska days. But she's also just as neurotic, which adds depth to her love songs." Mikael Wood of the Los Angeles Times opined, "At its best, Push and Shove channels some of the infectiously restless energy of Rock Steady [...] And it further polishes a bold mix-and-match aesthetic that feels familiar today in part because of records such as Tragic Kingdom." Sal Cinquemani of Slant Magazine found that "the more interesting tracks are stacked on the front end of Push and Shove, and the songs on the second half of the album are comparably safer, blurring together upon first listen."

Theon Weber of Spin concluded, "This isn't a great album [...] It's also—in its confidence, its playfulness, and the slightly stoned degree to which it is relaxed—No Doubt's most accomplished party." Ryan Reed of Paste dubbed the album "a welcome return, even if it's a tad exhausting", adding that "No Doubt has always been more than a platform for a gifted frontwoman, a fact Push and Shove seems to forget at times, downplaying the band's fluid chemistry in favor of soaring hooks and 'cranked to 11' dynamics." In a mixed review, Helen Brown of The Daily Telegraph felt that "too much of the record sounds like generic, Katy Perry-esque power-pop." The Guardian's Caroline Sullivan remarked that "this record simply takes up where 2001's Rock Steady left off", but ultimately stated, "As a comeback, this is nice work." The Independent's Andy Gill commented that the album finds No Doubt "making only the most tentative divergences from previously tried and tested strategies, which gives Push and Shove a character that could be described as either dated or timeless." Rolling Stone critic Jody Rosen expressed, "The songs are catchy, but Gwen Stefani doesn't have the voice, or the gravitas, for grandiose tunes." Maria Schurr of PopMatters panned the lyrics as "abysmally bad" and remarked, "After 'One More Summer' [...] and the inconsistent but decent title song, the album becomes so filler-centric that even the tracks' titles [...] are interchangeable."

== Commercial performance ==
Push and Shove debuted at number three on the Billboard 200, selling 115,000 copies in its first week. The album debuted at number 16 on the UK Albums Chart, selling 6,635 copies. In Canada, the album entered the Canadian Albums Chart at number five with first-week sales of 8,000 copies.

== Track listing ==
All tracks are written by Gwen Stefani, Tony Kanal, and Tom Dumont, except where noted.

No.	Title	Writer(s)	Producer(s)	Length
1.	"Settle Down"		Mark "Spike" Stent	6:00
2.	"Looking Hot"		Stent; Anthony Gorry^{[a]}	4:42
3.	"One More Summer"		Stent	4:39
4.	"Push and Shove" (featuring Busy Signal and Major Lazer)	Stefani, Kanal, Dumont, Reanno Gordon, Thomas Pentz, David Taylor, Ariel Rechtshaid	Stent; Major Lazer; Rechtshaid^{[a]}	5:06
5.	"Easy"		Stent	5:10
6.	"Gravity"		Stent; Gorry^{[a]}	4:25
7.	"Undercover"		Stent	3:31
8.	"Undone"		Stent	4:37
9.	"Sparkle"	Stefani, David Stewart, Dumont	Stent	4:08
10.	"Heaven"		Stent	4:07
11.	"Dreaming the Same Dream"		Stent	5:27
Total length:				51:52

Japanese edition bonus track
No.	Title	Producer(s)	Length
12.	"Settle Down" (Jonas Quant Remix)	Stent	4:33

Deluxe edition bonus disc
No.	Title	Writer(s)	Producer(s)	Length
1.	"Stand and Deliver" (Adam and the Ants cover)	Adam Ant, Marco Pirroni	Stent	3:21
2.	"Settle Down" (Acoustic – Santa Monica Sessions)		No Doubt	4:02
3.	"Looking Hot" (Acoustic – Santa Monica Sessions)		No Doubt	4:20
4.	"One More Summer" (Acoustic – Santa Monica Sessions)		No Doubt	4:20
5.	"Easy" (Acoustic – Santa Monica Sessions)		No Doubt	4:48
6.	"Looking Hot" (Jonas Quant Remix)		Stent; Gorry^{[a]}	4:48
7.	"One More Summer" (Jonas Quant Remix)		Stent	4:36
8.	"Push and Shove" (Anthony Gorry Remix)	Stefani, Kanal, Dumont, Gordon, Pentz, Taylor, Rechtshaid	Stent; Major Lazer; Rechtshaid^{[a]}	5:34
Total length:				87:41

Notes

- ^{^a} signifies an additional producer
- In the United States, the physical deluxe edition was released exclusively to Target.

== Personnel ==
Credits adapted from the liner notes of the deluxe edition of Push and Shove.

No Doubt

- Gwen Stefani – vocals
- Tony Kanal – bass guitar
- Tom Dumont – guitar (unspecified tracks); synthesizer (tracks 1, 10)
- Adrian Young – drums, percussion (unspecified tracks); V-Drums (tracks 3, 4, 6, 9)

Additional musicians

- Anthony Gorry – programming, keyboards (tracks 1–4, 6–9, 11)
- Jonas Quant – programming, keyboards (tracks 1–3, 10)
- Neil Kanal – additional programming (track 1)
- Stephen Hilton – strings (track 1); programming, keyboards (track 5); additional strings (track 11)
- Gabrial McNair – trombone (tracks 2, 4, 5, 9); melodica (track 2)
- Stephen Bradley – trumpet (tracks 2, 4, 5, 9)
- Wayne Wilkins – programming, keyboards (track 3)
- Busy Signal – vocals (track 4)
- David Moyer – baritone saxophone (track 4)
- David Emery – programming, keyboards (tracks 9, 10)

Technical

- Greg Collins – engineering, vocal recording (tracks 1, 11)
- Anthony Gorry – additional production (tracks 2, 6)
- Ariel Rechtshaid – additional production, additional recording (track 4)
- Diplo – additional recording (track 4)
- Shane C. Brown – additional recording (track 4)
- Mark "Spike" Stent – production, mixing
- Major Lazer – production (track 4)
- Matty Green – recording, mix engineering
- Neil Kanal – recording engineering
- Brian Gardner – mastering
- Donnie Spada – studio backline
- Daniel Jensen – studio backline
- Pierre Eiras – studio assistance
- Kevin Mills – studio assistance
- Rouble Kapoor – studio assistance
- Kiki Cholewka – studio assistance

Artwork

- Jolie Clemens – art direction, layout
- Emily Frye – art direction, layout
- El Mac – cover painting
- Yu Tsai – photographs

=== Deluxe edition bonus disc ===
No Doubt

- Gwen Stefani – vocals
- Tom Dumont – acoustic guitar (tracks 2–4); electric guitar (track 5)
- Tony Kanal – acoustic bass guitar (tracks 2–5)
- Adrian Young – drums (tracks 2, 3, 5); trigger pad, percussion (track 2); tambourine (tracks 3, 5); shaker (track 5)

Additional musicians

- Wayne Wilkins – programming (track 1)
- Fabien Waltmann – programming (track 1)
- Gabrial McNair – trombone (tracks 1, 3, 5); piano, backing vocals (tracks 2, 3, 5); keyboards, strings (track 4)
- Stephen Bradley – backing vocals (tracks 2, 3, 5); trumpet (tracks 3–5); castanets (track 3)
- Busy Signal – vocals (track 8)

Technical

- Mark "Spike" Stent – production, mixing (track 1)
- Matty Green – recording (track 1); mixing (tracks 2–5)
- No Doubt – production (tracks 2–5)
- Jonas Quant – remix (tracks 6, 7)
- Anthony Gorry – remix (track 8)
- L. Henry Sarmiento II – mix engineering (track 8)

== Charts ==
=== Weekly charts ===
Chart (2012)	Peak position
Australian Albums (ARIA)	8
Austrian Albums (Ö3 Austria)	11
Belgian Albums (Ultratop Flanders)	41
Belgian Albums (Ultratop Wallonia)	44
Canadian Albums (Billboard)	5
Croatian Albums (HDU)	33
Czech Albums (ČNS IFPI)	48
Dutch Albums (Album Top 100)	28
French Albums (SNEP)	33
German Albums (Offizielle Top 100)	11
Greek Albums (IFPI)	26
Irish Albums (IRMA)	23
Italian Albums (FIMI)	37
Japanese Albums (Oricon)	44
New Zealand Albums (RMNZ)	11
Norwegian Albums (VG-lista)	32
Scottish Albums (Official Charts)	18
South Korean Albums (Circle)	63
South Korean Albums (Circle) Deluxe edition	45
South Korean International Albums (Circle)	12
South Korean International Albums (Circle) Deluxe edition	7
Spanish Albums (Promusicae)	30
Swedish Albums (Sverigetopplistan)	55
Swiss Albums (Schweizer Hitparade)	9
UK Albums (Official Charts)	16
US Billboard 200	3
US Top Alternative Albums (Billboard)	3
US Top Rock Albums (Billboard)	3

=== Year-end charts ===
Chart (2012)	Position
US Billboard 200	155
US Top Alternative Albums (Billboard)	25
US Top Rock Albums (Billboard)	46

== Release history ==
Region	Date	Format(s)	Edition(s)	Label	Ref.
Australia	September 21, 2012	CD; digital download	Standard; deluxe	Universal	
Germany	September 21, 2012	CD; digital download	Standard; deluxe	Universal	
Netherlands	September 21, 2012	CD; digital download	Standard; deluxe	Universal	
France	September 24, 2012	CD; digital download	Standard; deluxe	Universal	
United Kingdom	September 24, 2012	CD; digital download	Standard; deluxe	Polydor	
Canada	September 25, 2012	CD; LP; digital download	Standard; deluxe	Universal	
Italy	September 25, 2012	CD; digital download	Standard	Universal	
Poland	September 25, 2012	CD; digital download	Standard; deluxe	Universal	
United States	September 25, 2012	CD; digital download	Standard; deluxe	Interscope	
Japan	September 26, 2012	CD; digital download	Standard; deluxe	Universal	
Sweden	September 26, 2012	CD; digital download	Standard; deluxe	Universal	
Italy	October 2, 2012	CD; digital download	Deluxe	Universal	
United States	October 2, 2012	LP	Standard	Interscope	
United Kingdom	October 4, 2012	LP	Standard	Polydor	
Germany	October 5, 2012	LP	Standard	Universal	
Netherlands	October 5, 2012	LP	Standard	Universal	
France	October 8, 2012	LP	Standard	Universal	
Sweden	October 8, 2012	LP	Standard	Universal	
