= Push and Shove (song) =

2012 song by No Doubt

Promotional single by No Doubt featuring Busy Signal and Major Lazer

from the album Push and Shove
- Released: August 29, 2012
- Recorded: 2012
- Studio: Mad Decent Studios (Atwater Village, CA); Heavy Duty Studios (Burbank, CA); Penthouse Studios (Kingston, Jamaica); Kingsbury Studios (Los Feliz, CA); MixSuite L.A. (Santa Monica, CA); Record One (Sherman Oaks, CA)
- Genre: Ska; dub; reggae fusion
- Length: 5:07
- Label: Interscope
- Songwriters: Gwen Stefani; Tony Kanal; Tom Dumont; Reanno Gordon; Thomas Pentz; David Taylor; Ariel Rechtshaid
- Producers: Mark "Spike" Stent; Major Lazer

Music video
- "Push and Shove" on YouTube

"Push and Shove" is a song by American rock band No Doubt, released as a promotional single from their sixth studio album of the same name. The song was written by Gwen Stefani, Tony Kanal, Tom Dumont, Reanno Gordon, Thomas Pentz, David Taylor, Ariel Rechtshaid and was produced by Major Lazer and Spike Stent. It features additional production from Major Lazer as well as vocals from Jamaican dancehall artist Busy Signal. The song blends ska, dub, reggae and dubstep.

"Push and Shove" premiered on the radio program On Air with Ryan Seacrest on August 29, 2012. No Doubt stated that they were unsure whether the track would be a single, where it was then later confirmed that "Looking Hot" would be released as the second single from the album instead. Bassist Tony Kanal stated "Push and Shove" was to No Doubt as "Bohemian Rhapsody" was to Queen. A music video for the song was uploaded to Vevo on September 25, 2012.

== Background and release ==
After the group's hiatus for 5 years, the band began initial work on the album in March 2008, after Gwen Stefani wrapped the tour behind her second solo album, The Sweet Escape. Songwriting on the effort reportedly got off to a slow start because, according to a post from Stefani, she was distracted by her second pregnancy, though she was certain at the time that "this could be the most inspired No Doubt record so far." The band reconvened at bassist Tony Kanal's personal studio in Hollywood after the tour concluded and spent the majority of 2010 writing and carefully polishing several demos. In January 2011, No Doubt guitarist Tom Dumont posted a message letting fans know that the group transitioned to the Santa Monica studio of producer Spike Stent, who also worked on Rock Steady, to officially begin tracking the effort.

Rolling Stone visited Stent's studio and sampled several songs the band had recorded. Of the 12 tracks announced at that time, the magazine lavished particular affection on "Settle Down", calling it a "party-ready reggae blast", and "One More Summer", which "updates the band's ska-pop sound with pounding dance beats, arena-size guitars and a beyond-catchy chorus." A month after Rolling Stone's studio visit, in late July 2011, the band teamed up in the studio with Major Lazer, the recording name for producers Diplo and Switch. The group reportedly recruited the duo for a track titled "Push and Shove." In May, 2012, the band previewed "Push and Shove" in their first studio webisode, while on June 11, 2012, they also announced that "Push and Shove" will be the title of the album.

"Push and Shove" was subsequently released as a promotional single on the iTunes store on August 29, 2012, with the song premiering on the Ryan Seacrest show. No Doubt stated that they were unsure whether the track would be a single, where it was then later confirmed that "Looking Hot" would be released as the second single from the album instead.

== Composition and lyrics ==
"Push and Shove"
30-second sample of "Push and Shove" featuring Busy Signal's vocals.

"Push and Shove" was written by Gwen Stefani, Tony Kanal, Tom Dumont, Reanno Gordon, Thomas Pentz (Diplo), David Taylor, Ariel Rechtshaid and was produced by Major Lazer and Spike Stent. It features Major Lazer as well as vocals from Jamaican dancehall artist Busy Signal.

Bassist Tony Kanal stated in an interview for Rolling Stone that, "It's our 'Bohemian Rhapsody'", referring the song to Queen's classic, because of the song's schizo genre-hopping. "Push and Shove" wildly crosses various genres and tempos, bouncing between reggae-infused beats, verging dangerously close to dubstep and a slow, swooning chorus. Rolling Stone magazine called the song "a wild fluctuation between genres and tempos". "Never play it safe / No relapse", Stefani sings with a Caribbean lilt in the ska-flavored opening verse. The chorus features Stefani crooning over an instrumental breakdown The track finds room for a rapping by dancehall artist Busy Signal, and a couplet that rhymes "Livin' La Vida Loca" with "soca."

== Reception ==
Marc Hogan of Spin said the song contained No Doubt's familiar sound "while also pushing ahead with current trends, [...] because that's what the one-time ska band have been doing all along." Carl Williott of Idolator said the song was like "Tragic Kingdom merged with one of Major Lazer's island party bangers" and was "just shy of dubstep". Nick Levine of NME said the song was "bonkers and brilliant" and also noted similarities to Tragic Kingdom. Kelsey Hovermale of Ryan Seacrest website wrote that "The band gives their fans everything from hot reggae rap, to a saucy chorus where Gwen soulfully admits, "you got me good." Backatcha, Gwen. We don't know whether to dance to this upbeat jam, or bow at No Doubt's feet for shoving us right back into the music we've always loved them for."

== Music video ==
The music video for "Push and Shove" was directed by Sophie Muller and filmed in New York City. It premiered on September 25, 2012. The video is presented in black and white and features the band at a bar and walking through empty streets. Robert Daw from Idolator said that the music video showed the band causing "teenager-like havoc" and they were "the type of hooligans you want to throw a bucket of water on while they're drunkenly howling on the sidewalk below your bedroom window at 2.15 am."

== Track listing ==
- Digital download
1. "Push and Shove" – 5:06

== Credits and personnel ==
- Gwen Stefani – vocals
- Thomas Pentz – vocals, production
- Reanno Gordon – vocals
- David Taylor – vocals
- Anthony Gorry – keyboards, programming
- Mark "Spike" Stent – production
- Ariel Rechtshaid – additional production

== Charts ==
Chart performance for "Push and Shove"
Chart (2012)	Peak position
US Alternative Digital Songs (Billboard)	22
US Rock Digital Songs (Billboard)	30

== Release history ==
Release dates and formats for "Push and Shove"
Region	Date	Format	Label	Ref.
United States	August 29, 2012	Digital download	Interscope	
