= Bathwater (song) =

2000 single by No Doubt

- Australian commercial single

Single by No Doubt

from the album Return of Saturn
- B-side: "Beauty Contest"; "Under Construction"
- Released: November 14, 2000
- Genre: Ska punk; pop-punk
- Length: 4:01
- Label: Interscope
- Songwriters: Tom Dumont; Tony Kanal; Gwen Stefani
- Producer: Glen Ballard

No Doubt singles chronology
"Simple Kind of Life" (2000)	"Bathwater" (2000)	"Hey Baby" (2001)

Music video
- "Bathwater" on YouTube

"Bathwater" is a song by American rock band No Doubt, released on November 14, 2000, as the fourth and final single from their fourth studio album, Return of Saturn. It was written by Tom Dumont, Tony Kanal, and Gwen Stefani

== Background and writing ==
The song was written in only ten minutes, opening with slow New Orleans funeral brass and Adrian Young as a human beat-box. The lyrics discuss overcoming insecurities about a relationship with adoration. The lyric "to wash in your old bathwater" means accepting a lover's faults.

"Bathwater" is a ska punk and a pop-punk song written in the key of E minor. It is composed in swing time with a medium swing and moves at a moderately fast tempo of 138 beats per minute. The song's verses are carried by perfect fifth chords with a i-IV chord progression. Some use minor key piano chords on the off beat. Stefani's vocal range spans over two octaves in the song, from G_{3} to B_{5}.

== Critical reception ==
"Bathwater" received mixed reviews from music critics. Entertainment Weekly described the song's cabaret style as campy and noted that "even lovelorn teen girls may... think it's pretty yucky." Rolling Stone described it as a combination of 2 Tone and the slapstick of farces by Gilbert and Sullivan that "never drops the band's signature blend of adrenaline and sugar." In its review of The Singles 1992-2003, musicOMH disagreed and referred to it as an "uncomfortable merging" of 1940s dance music and the work of 2 Tone band Madness.

== Chart performance ==
The single was a commercial failure, contradicting the overall success of the Return of Saturn project. In the United States, the song failed to enter the Billboard Hot 100 and barely entered the Billboard Adult Top 40 chart, inching to number 39.

In the territories where the song did chart, it performed poorly. On the Australian ARIA singles chart, the single managed a number 71 peak position. In Germany, the song reached number 73.

On American Idol (season 6), Sanjaya Malakar performed "Bathwater", the week that Gwen Stefani was the mentor for the contestants. This performance is most famed for the mohawk Malakar wore, which was composed of seven ponytails.

== Music video ==
The music video was directed by Sophie Muller, who also directed the video to their previous single, "Simple Kind of Life". The whole video comprises dancing. In it, Adrian Young cross-dresses as Gwen by wearing a platinum blonde wig and a black dress and Gwen appears herself with her trademark platinum blonde hair and wearing a black shirt saying "CAN'T TOUCH THIS" in glittery writing. It also features members of the burlesque group The Pussycat Dolls.

== Track listing ==
1. "Bathwater" (G. Stefani/T. Kanal/T. Dumont) – 4:03
2. "Beauty Contest" (G. Stefani/T. Kanal) – 4:14
3. "Under Construction" (G. Stefani/T. Kanal) – 3:12
4. "Ex-Girlfriend" acoustic live (G. Stefani/T. Dumont/T. Kanal) – 3:50

== Charts ==
Chart (2000–2004)	Peak position
Australia (ARIA)	71
Belgium (Ultratip Bubbling Under Flanders)	4
Belgium (Ultratip Bubbling Under Wallonia)	5
Germany (GfK)	73
US Adult Pop Airplay (Billboard)	39

== Invincible Overlord remix ==
"Bathwater" (Invincible Overlord remix)

Single by No Doubt
- A-side: "It's My Life"
- Released: April 20, 2004
- Length: 3:07
- Label: Interscope
- Songwriters: Tom Dumont; Tony Kanal; Gwen Stefani
- Producer: Glen Ballard

No Doubt singles chronology
"It's My Life" (2003)	"Bathwater" (Invincible Overlord remix) (2004)	"Settle Down" (2012)

"Bathwater (Invincible Overlord remix)" was released as a single to promote the album The Singles 1992–2003, although the version on the album is the original version from Return of Saturn, not the remixed version. The song was remixed by Invincible Overlord, No Doubt guitarist Tom Dumont's side project. "Bathwater" was not originally released in the UK as a single; however, it was issued in 2004 as the second single from The Singles 1992–2003, as a double A-side with a re-release of previous single "It's My Life". The single peaked at number 17 on the UK Singles Chart. The video for "Bathwater (Invincible Overlord Remix)" is an edited version of the original video. It was the last single released by No Doubt before their five-year hiatus due to Gwen Stefani's solo career.

=== Track listings ===
CD single

1. "Bathwater" (Invincible Overlord remix)
2. "It's My Life" (Jacques Lu Cont's Thin White Duke mix)
3. "Bathwater" (Invincible Overlord remix) (video)
4. "It's My Life" (video)

UK CD single – "It's My Life" / "Bathwater"

1. "It's My Life" – 3:48
2. "Bathwater" (Invincible Overlord remix) - 3:07
3. "It's My Life" (Jacques Lu Cont's Thin White Duke mix) - 6:59
4. "It's My Life" (Chocolate O'Brian remix) - 5:43
5. "Bathwater" (Invincible Overlord remix video)
6. "It's My Life" (video)

=== Charts ===
Chart (2004)	Peak position
Australia (ARIA)	61
Ireland (IRMA)	6
Scottish Singles Sales (Official Charts)	22
UK Singles (Official Charts)	17
