= Tony Kanal =

British-American musician, songwriter and record producer

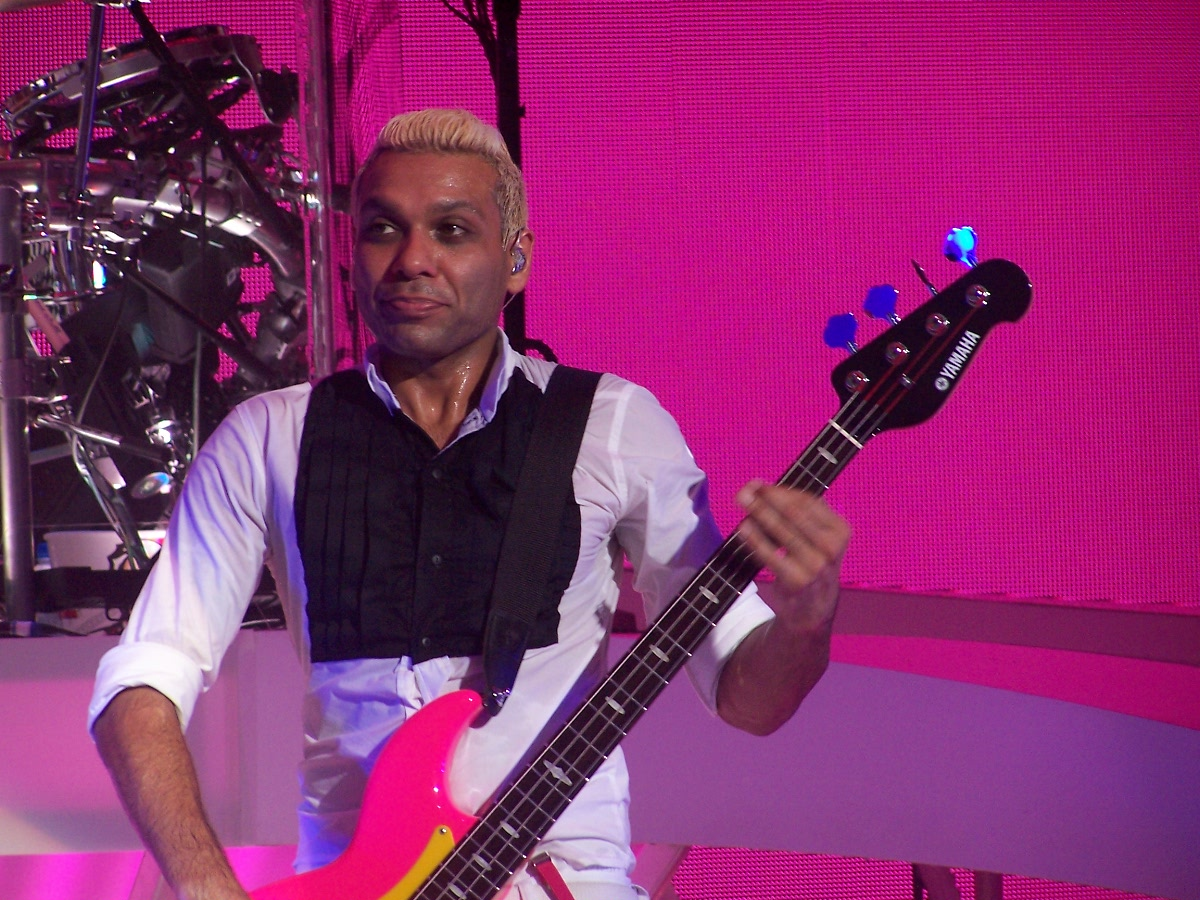
- Kanal performing with No Doubt in 2009

Background information
- Born: Tony Ashwin Kanal; 27 August 1970 (age 56); London, England
- Origin: Anaheim, California, U.S.
- Genres: Ska punk; pop rock; new wave; alternative rock; pop-punk
- Occupations: Musician; songwriter; record producer
- Instruments: Bass guitar; keyboards; saxophone
- Years active: 1987–present
- Member of: No Doubt; Dreamcar
- Spouse: Erin Lokitz
- Partner: Gwen Stefani (1987–1994)
- Website: tonykanal.com

Tony Ashwin Kanal (born 27 August 1970) is a British-American musician, songwriter and record producer who is known for his work as the bassist and co-writer for the rock bands No Doubt and Dreamcar. His career outside of performing includes production and songwriting credits with artists such as Pink, Weezer, Elan Atias and No Doubt lead singer Gwen Stefani's solo work.

== Early life ==
Kanal was born in Kingsbury, in northwest London, England into a Sindhi family. Kanal's father, Gulab, was from Sukkur (in present-day Sindh, Pakistan) and grew up in Delhi, India and his mother, Lajwanti "Lajju", was originally from Mumbai (then known as Bombay). His parents immigrated to London, where Kanal was born. While most of his early years were spent in the British capital city, Kanal and his family briefly lived in Toronto, Ontario and Munster, Indiana, before returning to London. At age 11, his family moved to the United States, settling in Anaheim, Orange County, California. Kanal attended South Junior High School and Anaheim High School. Upon entering seventh grade, Kanal joined his junior high school concert band. Kanal's father suggested that Kanal learn to play the saxophone because it was his favorite instrument. In tenth grade, Kanal learned how to play the electric bass guitar with help from his schoolmate, David J. Carpenter.

== Career ==
=== Early beginnings and No Doubt ===
After being invited to No Doubt's first official club show on 14 March 1987 by original drummer and fellow Anaheim High School alumnus Chris Webb, Kanal joined the band as its bassist at age 16. After high school, Kanal enrolled at California State University, Fullerton to major in psychology.

In 1991, No Doubt signed with Interscope Records and began recording their first full-length album. Their self-titled debut was released in 1992; that same year, they embarked on three U.S. van tours, playing clubs and theaters. Over the next decade, No Doubt released the follow-up albums Tragic Kingdom (1995), The Beacon Street Collection (1995), Return of Saturn (2000), Rock Steady (2001), as well as two compilation albums, The Singles 1992–2003 (2003) and Everything in Time: B-Sides, Rarities, Remixes (2004). The band toured the world and earned several awards, including two Grammy Awards and 5 MTV Music Video Awards.

=== 2004–2014: No Doubt hiatus, writing, and producing ===
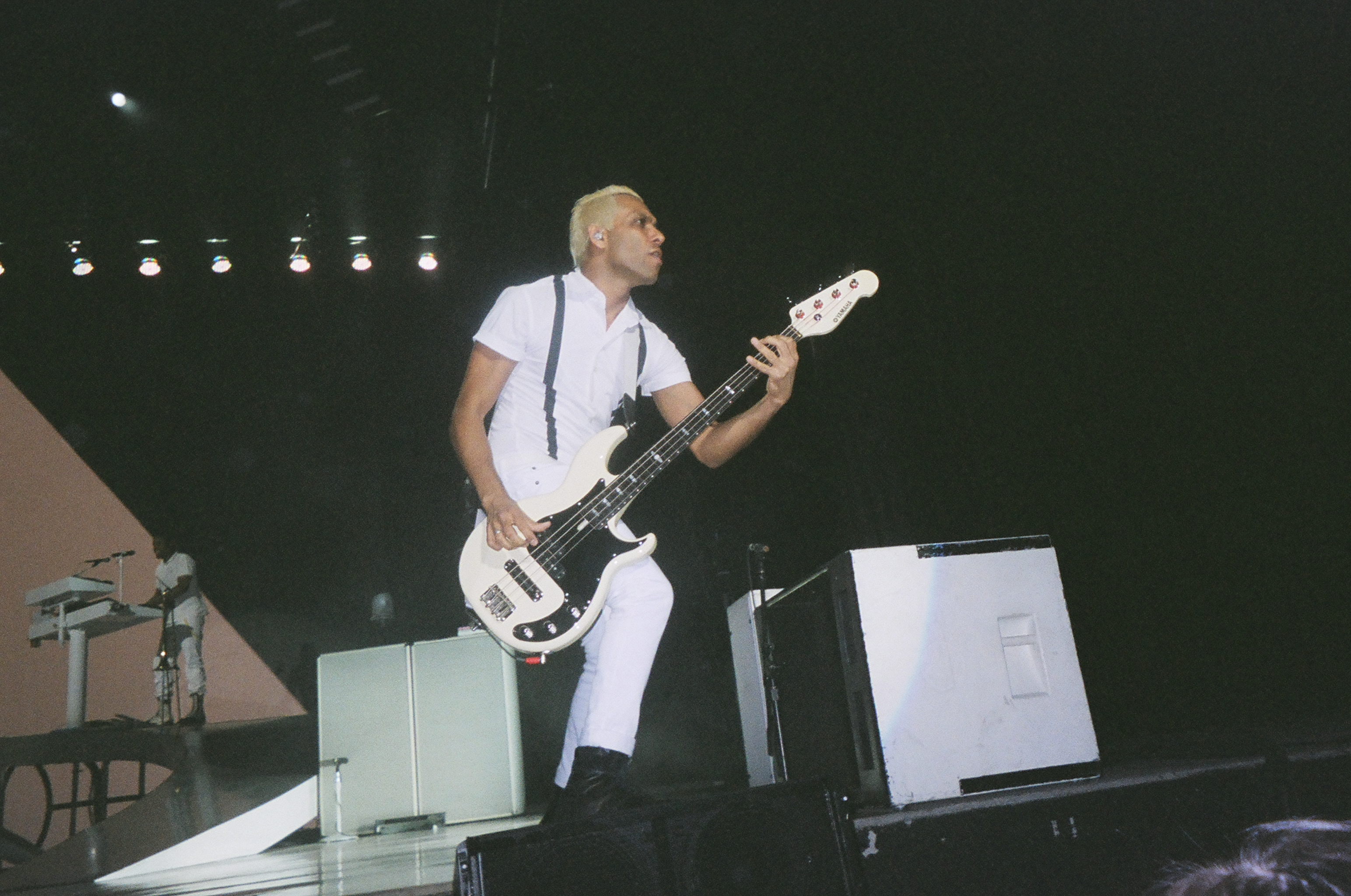
Kanal during No Doubt's 2009 summer reunion tour

In 2004, after touring the U.S. to promote The Singles 1992–2003, No Doubt went on hiatus. During this time, Kanal began producing and writing outside of the band. The same year, Kanal produced three songs for the soundtrack to 50 First Dates. Also in 2004, Kanal produced and co-wrote three tracks on Gwen Stefani's first solo album Love. Angel. Music. Baby. Kanal then produced Elan Atias's debut album Together as One, released in June 2006. Kanal worked with Gwen Stefani for her follow-up solo album The Sweet Escape, released in 2006.

He created several remixes, including ones of Stefani's "Hollaback Girl" and Gang of Four's "Ether." Kanal produced the song "Rent" for the ska punk band Pepper's 2006 album No Shame.

In 2008, he collaborated on two songs titled "Sober" and "Funhouse" with Pink for her album Funhouse. Kanal also co-wrote the song "Smart Girls" for Weezer's 2010 album Hurley.

In 2010, Kanal co-wrote, produced, and performed bass on the track "Kiss You Up", recorded by Barbadian artist Shontelle for her album No Gravity.

With Stefani promoting her second solo album, No Doubt began work on an album without her and planned to complete it after Stefani's tour was finished. In March 2008, the band started making posts concerning the progression of the album on their official fan forum. Stefani made a post on 28 March 2008 stating that songwriting had begun but was slow on her end because she was pregnant with her second child.

The band toured in 2009 for their first full-fledged band tour in nearly five years. The North American 2009 Summer Tour was the band's largest tour, playing over 50 shows.

In 2009, No Doubt made an appearance on the television series Gossip Girl, playing a fictional band named Snowed Out in the episode "Valley Girls". They performed their cover version of the Adam and the Ants song "Stand and Deliver". In 2010, the band performed at the Kennedy Center Honors in Washington, D.C., to celebrate the life's work of Paul McCartney. Their performance was attended by President Obama and First Lady Michelle Obama.

In 2012, No Doubt released Push and Shove, their latest release. They performed seven sold-out shows in Los Angeles at the Universal Amphitheater. In 2014 and 2015, they played the Global Citizens Festivals in New York City and Washington, D.C., and headlined music festivals in the United States.

=== 2014–present: Dreamcar and other bands ===
In 2014, Kanal and No Doubt bandmates Tom Dumont and Adrian Young, along with Davey Havok of AFI, formed the band Dreamcar. They released their debut self-titled album through Columbia Records in 2017 and toured the U.S. to support it, including performances at the Coachella Festival.

In October 2018, Kanal joined Danny Elfman during the encore of his three Nightmare Before Christmas shows at the Hollywood Bowl to play Oingo Boingo's "Dead Man's Party". On 31 October, Kanal performed a set of eight Red Hot Chili Peppers songs with musicians Adam Levine, Chad Smith, Andrew Watt, and Darren Criss at Maroon 5's annual Halloween party in Los Angeles.

In December 2018, Kanal played bass for The Offspring on their Australian festival headline tour. In January 2019, Kanal joined the band for their tour in Japan.

== Personal life ==
Kanal dated bandmate Gwen Stefani from 1987 to 1994. They continued to have a creative relationship after they broke up, which led to many of No Doubt's songs, most notably "Don't Speak". A decade later, Stefani co-wrote her song "Cool" about their relationship as friends for her 2004 debut solo album Love. Angel. Music. Baby.

Kanal is married to American home designer Erin Lokitz. On 24 January 2011, their first daughter, Coco Reese Lakshmi Kanal was born. On 22 November 2013, their second daughter, Saffron Rose Kiran Kanal was born.

Kanal is a vegan and animal rights activist. In addition to promoting and speaking publicly about animal rights issues, he has supported animal rights organizations including Farm Sanctuary, LA Animal Save, and Animal Hope and Wellness Foundation, Supporting The Fur Ban and has done numerous hen rescues with Animal Place.

== Musical equipment ==
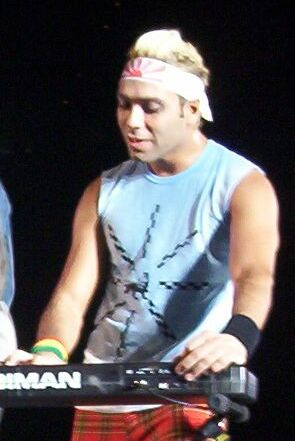
Kanal performing in 2002

Kanal endorses Yamaha basses which he runs through Gallien-Krueger heads into Ampeg cabinets.

== Discography ==
No Doubt

- 2012: Push and Shove (Interscope Records)
- 2004: Everything in Time (b-sides, rarities, remixes) (Interscope)
- 2003: The Singles 1992-2003 (Interscope)
- 2001: Rock Steady (Interscope)
- 2000: Return of Saturn (Interscope)
- 1995: Tragic Kingdom (Interscope)
- 1995: The Beacon Street Collection (Interscope)
- 1992: No Doubt (Interscope)

=== Writing and producing credits ===
Title	Year	Artist	Album	Credits
"Hold Me Now"	2004	Wayne Wonder	50 First Dates: Love songs from the Original Motion Picture	production, programming, keyboards
"Ghost in You"	2004	Mark McGrath	50 First Dates: Love songs from the Original Motion Picture	production, programming, keyboards
"Slave to Love"	2004	Elan Atias featuring Gwen Stefani	50 First Dates: Love songs from the Original Motion Picture	production, programming, keyboards
"Crash"	2004	Gwen Stefani	Love. Angel. Music. Baby.	songwriting, production, programming, keyboards
"Serious"	2004	Gwen Stefani	Love. Angel. Music. Baby.	songwriting, production, programming, keyboards
"Luxurious"	2004	Gwen Stefani	Love. Angel. Music. Baby.	songwriting, production, programming, keyboards
"Crazy" (remix)	2005	Alanis Morissette	Non-album single	remixer, programming, keyboards
"Hollaback Girl" (remix)	2005	Gwen Stefani featuring Elan Atias	Non-album single	remixer, programming, keyboards
"Ether" (remix)	2005	Gang of Four	''Return the Gift''	remixer, programming, keyboards
"Rent"	2006	Pepper	No Shame	production
"Allnighter"	2006	Elan Atias featuring Gwen Stefani	Together As One	songwriting, production, programming, keyboards
"Don't You Go"	2006	Elan Atias featuring Tami Chynn	Together As One	songwriting, production, programming, keyboards
"Together As One"	2006	Elan Atias	Together As One	songwriting, production, programming, keyboards
"Feel My Pressure"	2006	Elan Atias	Together As One	songwriting, production, programming, keyboards
"We Won't Stand for This"	2006	Elan Atias	Together As One	songwriting, production, programming, keyboards
"I Wanna Yell"	2006	Elan Atias	Together As One	production, programming, keyboards
"My Kingston Girl"	2006	Elan Atias	Together As One	production, programming, keyboards
"Girl"	2006	Elan Atias featuring Assassin	Together As One	production, programming, keyboards
"Nothing Is Worth Losing You"	2006	Elan Atias	Together As One	production, programming
"You Don't Come Around No More"	2006	Elan Atias featuring Cutty Ranks	Together As One	production, programming
"4 in the Morning"	2006	Gwen Stefani	The Sweet Escape	songwriting, production, programming, keyboards
"Fluorescent"	2006	Gwen Stefani	The Sweet Escape	songwriting, production, programming, keyboards
"Don't Get It Twisted"	2006	Gwen Stefani	The Sweet Escape	songwriting, production, programming, keyboards
"Paralysis"	2008	Scott Weiland	"Happy" in Galoshes	songwriter
"Funhouse"	2008	Pink	Funhouse	songwriting, production, bass guitar
"Sober"	2008	Pink	Funhouse	production, bass guitar
"Toxic Valentine"	2009	All Time Low	Jennifer's Body: Music From the Motion Picture	songwriting
"Freak Out"	2009	Jeanette	Undress to the Beat	songwriting
"Bubblegum"	2009	The Stunners	Non-album single	songwriting, production, programming
"Luvsik"	2009	Mozella	Belle Isle	songwriting, production, programming, keyboards, bass guitar
"Smart Girls"	2010	Weezer	Hurley	songwriting
"Kiss You Up"	2010	Shontelle	No Gravity	songwriting
"Push It"	2011	Jessie and The Toy Boys	Non-album single	songwriting, production, programming
"The Big Bang Theory"	2015	The Makemakes	Non-album single	songwriting
"Drips Gold"	2017	Eden XO featuring Raja Kuman	Non-album single	songwriting, production, programming
