= Squeal (song) =

Single by No Doubt

from the album The Beacon Street Collection
- B-side: "My Room Is Still Clean"
- Released: 1994
- Recorded: 1994
- Studio: Home Recordings (Fullerton, California)
- Genre: Ska
- Length: 2:38
- Label: Beacon Street
- Songwriter(s): Eric Stefani
- Producer(s): No Doubt

No Doubt singles chronology
"Trapped in a Box" (1992)	"Squeal" (1994)	"Doghouse" (1994)

Audio video
- "Squeal" on YouTube

"Squeal" is a song by American band No Doubt for their independent second studio album, The Beacon Street Collection (1995). Produced by the band, it was written by member Eric Stefani and released as the album's lead single in mid 1994. The band recorded "Squeal" in their Fullerton garage following Interscope Records's refusal to allow them studio time due to the commercial failure of No Doubt in 1992. Using the proceeds from their concerts, No Doubt created 7" singles for album tracks "Squeal" and "Doghouse". 1,000 copies of the single were distributed as part of the group's Beacon Street Records label.

The single is a "ska-tinged" song with a more developed and rawer sound than their material from 1992. In addition to the band members performing their standard instruments, its instrumentation is joined by a saxophone, trombone, and trumpet. "Squeal" features the last performance by saxophonist Eric Carpenter, who left the band shortly after. The lyrics describe a female criminal who is under fire when her partner betrays their trust and reveals her behavior to the police. For revenge, she resolves to kill him. Music journalist and author Jeff Apt provided a mixed review of "Squeal", praising Tom Dumont and Adrian Young's contributions to the production, but criticizing its uneven sound.

== Background and release ==
After the release of No Doubt in 1992, Interscope Records was disappointed in No Doubt for the album's lack of critical and commercial success. As the group prepared to begin work on another album, Interscope refused to drop No Doubt from the label and revoked funding for their recording sessions. To avoid wasting time, the group began recording their own songs from a makeshift recording studio in their home garage. Guitarist Tom Dumont said that the group wanted to be able to sell products to their fans after concerts and shows, so they professionally recorded "Squeal" to be given away. The single was also one of the first songs recorded for The Beacon Street Collection, the group's second studio album.

In 1994, "Squeal" was the first song released as part of No Doubt's two-part series of 7" singles titled ND Beacon Street Singles. Only 1,000 copies of the 7" single were produced, with each single being individually numbered. The B-side song to "Squeal" was "My Room Is Still Clean", a previously unreleased track written by Tony Kanal and taken from a live recording from the group in 1993. "Doghouse" was the second and final release from the series, distributed in 1994. Following the distribution of all 1,000 7" singles for "Squeal", the record went out of print. The song was later included as the ninth track on The Beacon Street Collection, which was independently released by No Doubt's Beacon Street Records label on March 25, 1995, in the United States. According to the liner notes of the parent album, "Squeal" and the other album tracks were recorded at the band members' homes on Beacon Street in Fullerton, California.

== Music and lyrics ==
"Squeal" is a "ska-tinged" song produced by the members of No Doubt. Like the majority of The Beacon Street Collection, "Squeal" contains synth arrangements and new wave-style influences to create a more developed and rawer sound than the music in its 1992 predecessor. Lead vocals are performed by Gwen Stefani, Eric's younger sister. Featuring a variety of instruments, Dumont plays the guitar, Tony Kanal plays the bass guitar, Eric Stefani performs on the keyboards, and Adrian Young plays the drums. Additional instrumentation is provided by Eric Carpenter on saxophone, Phil Jordan on trumpet, and future touring member Gabrial McNair on trombone.

"Squeal" is set in common time and has a very fast tempo of 161 beats per minute. The key of the song is set in D-flat major, with Stefani's vocal range spanning nearly an octave and a half. Stefani reaches a high note of F_{5} and a rather low note of G_{3} / A♭3 in scientific pitch notation. Written by Eric Stefani, the song's lyrics detail a criminal's reaction to her partner's betrayal to the police. The couple had agreed to be "in this together" but, after the man "squeals", the woman resolves to "kill the narc" who revealed that she was guilty of a crime. During the song's chorus, Stefani questions her accomplice to a crime: "Why can't you keep a secret? / Why'd you squeal? / I thought that I could trust you / Why'd you squeal?"

== Critical reception ==
Jeff Apter, a music journalist and author of the 2009 biography Gwen Stefani and No Doubt: A Simple Kind of Life, provided a mixed review for "Squeal" when discussing The Beacon Street Collection. He suggested that the song sounded as if it was "stitched together from several separate, unfinished pieces of music". However, he enjoyed the performances from guitarist Dumont and drummer Young, who "gave the song [some] real juice". Ending his review, he claimed that "Squeal" had become popular amongst No Doubt fans, as it featured the last performance from Eric Carpenter who later departed the band.

== Track listing ==
US 7" single
No.	Title	Length
1.	"Squeal"	2:38
2.	"My Room Is Still Clean" (Live)	2:02

== Credits ==
Credits obtained from the liner notes of The Beacon Street Collection.

- Bass – Tony Kanal
- Drums – Adrian Young
- Guitar – Tom Dumont
- Keyboards – Eric Stefani
- Saxophone – Eric Carpenter
- Trombone – Gabe McNair
- Trumpet – Phil Jordan
- Vocals – Gwen Stefani
- Written by – Eric Stefani

== Release history ==
Release dates and formats for "Squeal"
Region	Date	Format	Label	Ref.
United States	1994	7"	Beacon Street	
