= Doghouse (song) =

Single by No Doubt

from the album The Beacon Street Collection
- B-side: "You Can't Teach an Ol' Dog New Tricks"
- Released: 1994
- Recorded: 1994
- Studio: Home Recordings (Fullerton, California)
- Genre: Ska pop
- Length: 4:26
- Label: Beacon Street
- Songwriter(s): Eric Stefani
- Producer(s): No Doubt

No Doubt singles chronology
"Squeal" (1994)	"Doghouse" (1994)	"Just a Girl" (1995)

Audio video
- "Doghouse" on YouTube

"Doghouse" is a song by American band No Doubt from their independent second studio album, The Beacon Street Collection (1995). Produced by the band, it was written by member Eric Stefani and released as the album's second and final single in late 1994. The band recorded "Doghouse" in their garage following Interscope Records's refusal to provide them funding and professional studio time. No Doubt used the proceeds from their concerts to create a 7" single for "Squeal" and "Doghouse". 1,000 copies of the single were distributed as part of the group's Beacon Street Records label.

The song is a blues-inspired ska pop track similar to the other songs on The Beacon Street Collection. Its beat is accompanied by a saxophone, trombone, and trumpet. The lyrics detail a struggling relationship between a man and a woman; it uses the metaphor of a dog and its master to illustrate the female's desire for control and dominance. It is the first release by No Doubt to feature several musicians, including touring member Gabrial McNair. Critically, "Doghouse" was deemed in desperate need of a tune-up by music journalist and author Jeff Apt.

== Background and recording ==
Following the release of No Doubt's self-titled debut album in 1992, Interscope Records was disappointed in the project's lack of success, both commercially and critically. Despite the underwhelming performance, the label refused to drop No Doubt and revoked funding for their future releases. The group started creating their own songs from a makeshift recording studio in their garage. Guitarist Tom Dumont recalled that they "didn’t have any music to sell to [the] people coming to our shows", so "Doghouse" was recorded specifically to be handed out to their fans; it was also one of the first songs recorded for The Beacon Street Collection, the group's second studio album.

In 1994, No Doubt created a two-part series of 7" singles in support of The Beacon Street Collection titled ND Beacon Street Singles. The first single released as part of the collection was "Squeal", earlier in 1994, followed by "Doghouse" in late 1994. According to the single's liner notes, the songs were recorded at the band members' homes on Beacon Street, a local road in Fullerton, California. The "Doghouse" 7" single release was limited to 1,000 copies and each single is individually numbered. The B-side song was "You Can't Teach an Ol' Dog New Tricks", a previously unreleased track written by Eric Stefani.

The Beacon Street Collection was independently released by No Doubt's Beacon Street Records label on March 25, 1995; "Doghouse" serves as the album's closing track. Following the sale of all 1,000 7" singles for "Doghouse", the record went out of print.

== Composition and lyrics ==
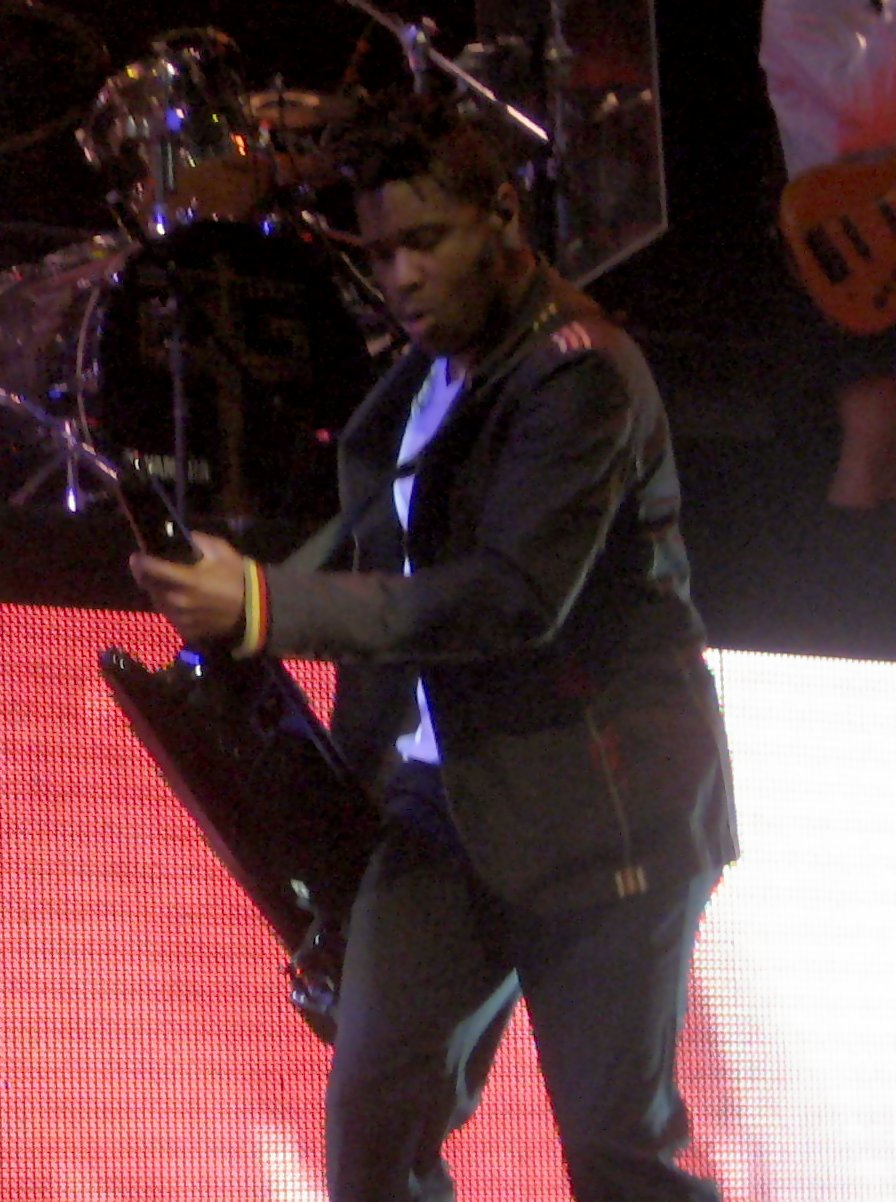
"Doghouse" is No Doubt's first major release to include touring member Gabrial McNair.

Musically, "Doghouse" is a blues-influenced ska pop track. It contains a progressive sound that author Jeff Apter considered a common element within The Beacon Street Collection. Like the majority of the parent album, it contains synth arrangements and new wave-style influences to create a rawer sound than the music from its predecessor, No Doubt. Lead vocals are performed by Gwen Stefani. With an ensemble of instruments, Dumont plays the guitar, Tony Kanal performs bass guitar, Eric Stefani uses the keyboards, and Adrian Young handles the drums. Additional instrumentation is provided by Gerard Boisse on saxophone, Phil Jordan on trumpet, and touring member Gabrial McNair on trombone.

"Doghouse" is set in common time and has a very fast tempo of 158 beats per minute. The key of the song is in B minor, with Stefani's vocal range spanning nearly an octave and a half. During the song's bridge leading up the final iteration of the chorus, she reaches the high note of D_{6}, in scientific pitch notation. Lyrically, it is about a man who is bullied and dominated by his girlfriend and is unwilling to force the situation to change. The song uses the metaphor of a dog and its master to illustrate the nature of the relationship, saying that she had got him "by the reins" and he has been "conditioned" by her. In the refrain, Stefani sings: "You're just a doggy / In a snap, you're fetching the bone / And you're barking when she calls / You're hiding behind the fence / You've been disobedient."

== Critical reception ==
Jeff Apter, music journalist and author of the 2009 biography Gwen Stefani and No Doubt: A Simple Kind of Life, suggested that "Doghouse" was another song on The Beacon Street Collection that was in desperate need of a tune-up for a more satisfying sound. However, he attributed the progressive sound of the single to the band's first collaboration with outsider musicians, such as Boisse, Jordan, and McNair.

== Track listing ==
US 7" single
No.	Title	Length
1.	"Doghouse"	4:26
2.	"You Can't Teach an Ol' Dog New Tricks"	2:11

== Credits ==
Obtained from the liner notes of the "Doghouse" 7" single.

- Bass – Tony Kanal
- Drums – Adrian Young
- Guitar – Tom Dumont
- Keyboards – Eric Stefani
- Saxophone – Gerard Boisse
- Trombone – Gabe McNair
- Trumpet – Phil Jordan
- Vocals – Gwen Stefani
- Written by – Eric Stefani

== Release history ==
Release dates and formats for "Doghouse"
Region	Date	Format	Label	Ref.
United States	1994	7"	Beacon Street	
