= All of the Dead Girls =

2017 song by Dreamcar

Single by Dreamcar

from the album Dreamcar
- Released: July 2017
- Genre: Power pop; synth-pop
- Length: 3:31
- Label: Columbia
- Songwriter(s): Tom Dumont; Davey Havok; Tony Kanal; Adrian Young
- Producer(s): Tim Pagnotta

Dreamcar singles chronology
"Kill for Candy" (2017)	"All of the Dead Girls" (2017)

Lyric video
- "All of the Dead Girls" on YouTube

"All of the Dead Girls" is a song by American supergroup Dreamcar for their self-titled debut album from 2017. The song was produced by Tim Pagnotta and written by the group's four members: Tom Dumont, Davey Havok, Tony Kanal, and Adrian Young. Originally distributed as a promotional single in April, it was later released as the album's second single in July 2017, through Columbia Records. Lead singer Havok was inspired by his friend, American actor Josh Richman, to write a song about "dead girls", resulting in a darker, slightly morbid song. Musically, it is a 1980s-influenced power pop and synth-pop track that contains backing vocals from Dumont, Kanal, and Young. Former No Doubt member Gabrial McNair appears as a keyboardist on the song.

Music critics provided mixed reviews of "All of the Dead Girls", and discussed the song's lyrics and production. Some critics compared it to the works of 1980s groups, such as New Order, Duran Duran, Bauhaus, Adam Ant, and the Cure. Dreamcar performed the song on Jimmy Kimmel Live! in April 2017 and during their promotional United States tour. During concert performances of "All of the Dead Girls", the group planned to film its music video.

== Background and release ==
Dreamcar is an American supergroup, consisting of AFI's lead vocalist Davey Havok with Tony Kanal, Tom Dumont, and Adrian Young, all members of No Doubt. No Doubt's vocalist Gwen Stefani resumed work on her solo career, leaving the three to become interested in pursuing a new project. "All of the Dead Girls" was written by Havok, Kanal, Dumont and Young, and produced by Sugarcult's Tim Pagnotta. Mark Stent mixed the song, with Ted Jensen serving as the mastering engineer. When asked if he had any anecdotes about songwriting in an interview with Billboard, Havok discussed his inspiration behind "All of the Dead Girls":

When I started writing 'All of the Dead Girls', it came from the concept of the lyric 'dead girls,' which was informed by my dear friend Josh Richman whom I lived with for many years. I wrote this whole record in his home up in the Hollywood Hills. If you read the lyrics of that song, it's a multilayered self-aware, self-unaware dichotomy. It wasn't a direct quote, but it was a comment about me and those who have an affinity for me or not.

"All of the Dead Girls" was released as a promotional single for digital download and streaming in various countries on April 14, 2017, through Columbia Records. It was the third song to premiere prior to the release of Dreamcar, following lead single "Kill for Candy" and the first promotional single, "Born to Lie". The song debuted simultaneously with the release of an animated promotional lyric video, which was uploaded to the group's YouTube account, and an interactive, second music video for "Kill for Candy". At the 2017 Alternative Press Music Awards in July, Young revealed to Alternative Press' Chris Wall that "All of the Dead Girls" had been selected as the album's second single and would be released to modern rock radio stations later that week.

== Composition and lyrics ==
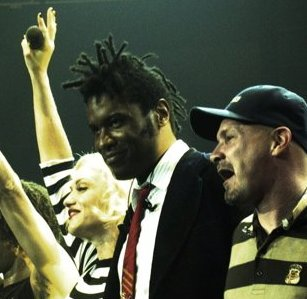
Fellow No Doubt member Gabrial McNair (middle, pictured in 2005) performs as a keyboardist on "All of the Dead Girls".

"All of the Dead Girls" is a dramatic, drum-led power pop and synth-pop song. Kanal, who plays bass guitar on the song, was compared to New Order's Peter Hook for his performance by Pitchfork's Zoe Camp. Riff Magazine's Brandi Smith compared the song's introduction to the work of British band the Cult and said its bridge sounds like "what might be the missing dance number in The Corpse Bride". Its sound is reminiscent of songs by 1980s-pop acts, including Adam Ant, Bauhaus, the Cure and Duran Duran, while the beat was described as Burundi-accented by AllMusic's Matt Collar. Chris Baker from Mxdwn.com called it the group's "poppiest" song to date, and believed it would be mesh well in the soundtracks of comedy movies. On the song, Dumont plays the guitar and keyboards, Kanal performs on bass guitar and keyboards, and Young plays the drums. The three also provide background vocals on "All of the Dead Girls" and reunited with No Doubt member Gabrial McNair, who also contributes to the instrumentation as a keyboardist. The addition of keyboards provided "layering [of] majestic swaths of synths", according to Collar.

"All of the Dead Girls" is set in common time, and has a relatively fast tempo of 150 beats per minute. The key of the song is in B major and it advances with a setup of two verses, each followed by a pre-chorus and chorus. Havok's vocal range follows the chord progressions of B-E-G#m-F#-E♭ in both the verses and choruses. Smith commented that the song's bridge is built around just one lyric ("Take me to your grave") which Havok repeatedly "begs".

== Critical reception and promotion ==
Tom Breihan from Stereogum called "All of the Dead Girls" an "immaculately produced" song and slightly indicative of the members' former backgrounds in punk music. In addition to "Kill for Candy", Collar referred to the song as a "hooky, infectious anthem [...] worthy of building a whole album around". Smith described the song as simultaneously "the album's catchiest song" but also "its most morbid". Collin Brennan, for Consequence of Sound, enjoyed the song for being "almost criminally catchy" and "a million times more fun than anything" from No Doubt's sixth and latest studio album, Push and Shove (2012); however, he criticized its vast influence from 1980s music, noting the song "can hardly stand on its own two feet" because of it. A staff member from PunkNews.org disliked "All of the Dead Girls", calling it overproduced and full of "cringeworthy" lyrics.

On the April 18, 2017 episode of Jimmy Kimmel Live!, Dreamcar made their first televised appearance, performing both "All of the Dead Girls" and "Kill for Candy". The group was unable to perform all of "All of the Dead Girls" due to time constraints. The live clip was posted to Jimmy Kimmel Live!'s YouTube channel. In August 2017, prior to singing "All of the Dead Girls" at The Conservatory in Santa Ana, California, Havok told the audience that the live performance would be recorded and was planned to be used as the album's second music video. During the segment, he "amped up the crowd by standing on top of speakers" which allowed the crowd "grab at him" and interact.

== Track listing ==
Digital download/streaming
No.	Title	Length
1.	"All of the Dead Girls"	3:31

== Credits and personnel ==
Credits adapted from Tidal.

- Tom Dumont – composer, lyricist, guitar, keyboards, background vocals
- Davey Havok – composer, lyricist, vocals
- Tony Kanal – composer, lyricist, bass guitar, keyboards, background vocals
- Adrian Young – composer, lyricist, drums, background vocals
- Tim Pagnotta – producer
- Ted Jensen – mastering engineer
- Mark Stent – mixing engineer
- Adam Hawkins – recording engineer
- Brian Phillips – recording engineer
- Michael Freeman – assistant engineer
- Peter Mack – assistant engineer
- Gabrial McNair – keyboards
- Scheila Gonzalez – saxophone

== Release history ==
Release dates and formats for "All of the Dead Girls"
Region	Date	Format(s)	Label	Ref.
United States	April 14, 2017	Digital download; streaming	Columbia	
United States	July 2017	Modern rock radio	Columbia	
