= Oslo (band) =

American rock band

OSLO
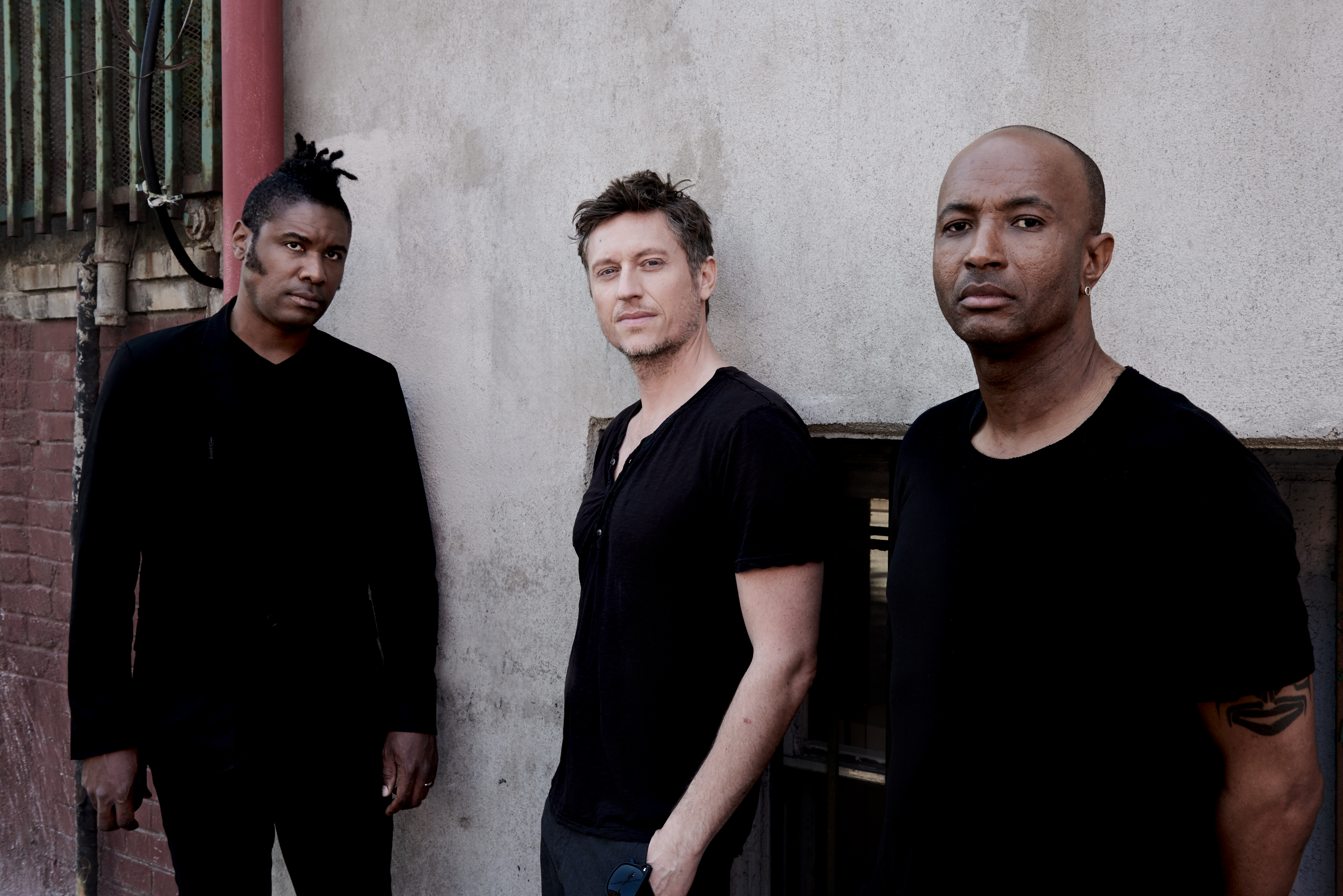
- Oslo in 2016 from left to right: Gabrial McNair, Mattia Borrani, Kerry Wayne James

Background information
- Origin: California, USA
- Genres: Alternative rock, Indie Rock, Post-Punk
- Years active: 2003 – Present
- Label: Independent
- Members: Mattia Borrani; Kerry Wayne James; Gabrial McNair
- Past members: Damon Ramirez; Charlie Walker

OSLO is an alternative/indie rock band who emerged on the Los Angeles music scene in 2005, consisting of the songwriting trio of Mattia Borrani on lead vocals, Kerry Wayne James on bass, and Gabrial McNair on guitars. Famously, McNair was a touring member of the band No Doubt. They added keyboardist Damon Ramirez, Adrian Young drummer from No Doubt and various drummers before settling on drummer Charlie Walker, who initially left the band in 2008 to live in New York City.

Their self-titled debut album garnered significant buzz and coverage from Rolling Stone, Billboard, LA Weekly and the Los Angeles Times, with radio single "Minute Gun" quickly becoming a favorite on LA's Indie 103. Critical acclaim of both their live shows and their debut release highlighted not only the band’s onstage showmanship, but the complexity and depth with which they compose music. In 2007 OSLO signed a publishing deal with Songs Music Publishing which led to multiple synch placements in film & TV, and touring with bands like Blue October, Third Eye Blind, Motion City Soundtrack and many more.

They released their second album, The Rise and Fall of Love and Hate, in November 2007. Which they co-produced with Grammy Nominated engineer/mixer Ryan Hewitt, Mickey P and Sam Fogarino (Interpol drummer). Fogarino also played drums on "Things Fall Apart" and "A Darker Shade". Adrian Young played drums on "Mistakes" Other guests artist included Melissa Auf der Maur from the band Hole sang backing vocals on "A Darker Shade". Paz Lenchantin from Pixies (band) played violin with her sister, cellist Ana Lenchantin on "Crowded Room". The band's lead single “Slowdive” was in rotation on SiriusXMU, college and specialty radio, “Rhyme Or Reason” was featured in the second season finale of the CBS TV show The Unit . Several songs from "Rise and Fall " were featured in film and tv network shows.

Their third album, High Mountain Sessions Vol. 1 was released in 2011, which featured several new tracks plus bonus remixes by Sam Fogarino (Sam Fog) and Andy Monaghan (Andreas Lust) from Frightened Rabbit. Their song "Riff Raff" was featured on two episodes of Showtime's hit series, "Shameless". .

After a reflective hiatus that saw all three members pursuing separate creative endeavors, in December 2016, the trio released a five song EP, aptly titled "The Morning After." On April 9, 2017, they opened for Dreamcar, the band featuring members of No Doubt and AFI lead singer Davey Havok, at the Great American Music Hall in San Francisco and on April 11, 2017 at Roxy Theatre in Los Angeles.

== In popular culture ==
- The song "The Stranger" was featured in an episode of the CBS TV show CSI: NY
- The song "Rhyme or Reason" was featured in the second season finale of the CBS TV show The Unit
- The song "The Rise and Fall of Love and Hate" was featured in an episode of the TV show Crash
- The song "Darker Shade of Grey" was featured in an episode of the BRAVO TV show "Quarterlife"
- The song "No Regrets" was featured in the movie "Middle of Nowhere" starring Susan Sarandon
- The song "Riff Raff" was featured in an episode of the Showtime TV show Shameless
- The song "Ears Are Ringing" was featured in an episode of the Showtime TV series Shameless

== Discography ==
- 2005: Oslo
- 2007: The Rise and Fall of Love and Hate
- 2011: High Mountain Session, Vol. 1
- 2016: The Morning After EP
