= Born to Lie =

2021 promotional single by Dreamcar

Promotional single by Dreamcar

from the album Dreamcar
- Released: April 7, 2017
- Genre: Alternative; new wave
- Length: 3:50
- Label: Columbia
- Songwriters: Tom Dumont; Davey Havok; Tony Kanal; Adrian Young
- Producer: Tim Pagnotta

Lyric video
- "Born to Lie" on YouTube

"Born to Lie" is a song by American supergroup Dreamcar for their self-titled debut studio album (2017). It was produced by Tim Pagnotta and written by the group's four members Tom Dumont, Davey Havok, Tony Kanal, and Adrian Young. The song was released as a promotional single for the album on April 7, 2017, through Columbia Records, and their second song overall. It is an alternative and new wave song with a dance beat. Stylistically, the song was compared and contrasted with Dreamcar's previous single, "Kill for Candy" (2017). Lyrically, "Born to Lie" discusses someone who has been unable to find or maintain a romantic relationship.

Some music critics discussed the roles of individual Dreamcar members in "Born to Lie", particularly Havok. They also compared it to the works of other bands, including Depeche Mode, A Flock of Seagulls, and the Killers. The song was promoted through the release of an animated lyric video via the group's YouTube channel.

== Background and release ==
Dreamcar is an American supergroup, consisting of Tony Kanal, Tom Dumont and Adrian Young, all members of No Doubt, and AFI's lead vocalist Davey Havok. No Doubt's vocalist Gwen Stefani resumed work on her solo career, allowing the other three to pursue a new musical project. Dreamcar released "Kill for Candy" as their debut and lead single in March 2017, for their first studio album Dreamcar (2017). "Born to Lie" was written by Dumont, Havok, Kanal, and Young, while produced by Sugarcult's lead vocalist Tim Pagnotta. Mark Stent served as the mixing engineer for the song, with Ted Jensen being the mastering engineer.

"Born to Lie" was released for digital download and streaming in the United States on April 7, 2017, through Columbia Records. On the same day, an animated promotional lyric video was uploaded to Dreamcar's YouTube channel. The song became Dreamcar's second one overall to be released to the public. It served as the first of several promotional singles for Dreamcar, becoming an instant download to those who pre-ordered the album. On May 12, 2017, "Born to Lie" was included as the third song on Dreamcar.

== Composition and lyrics ==
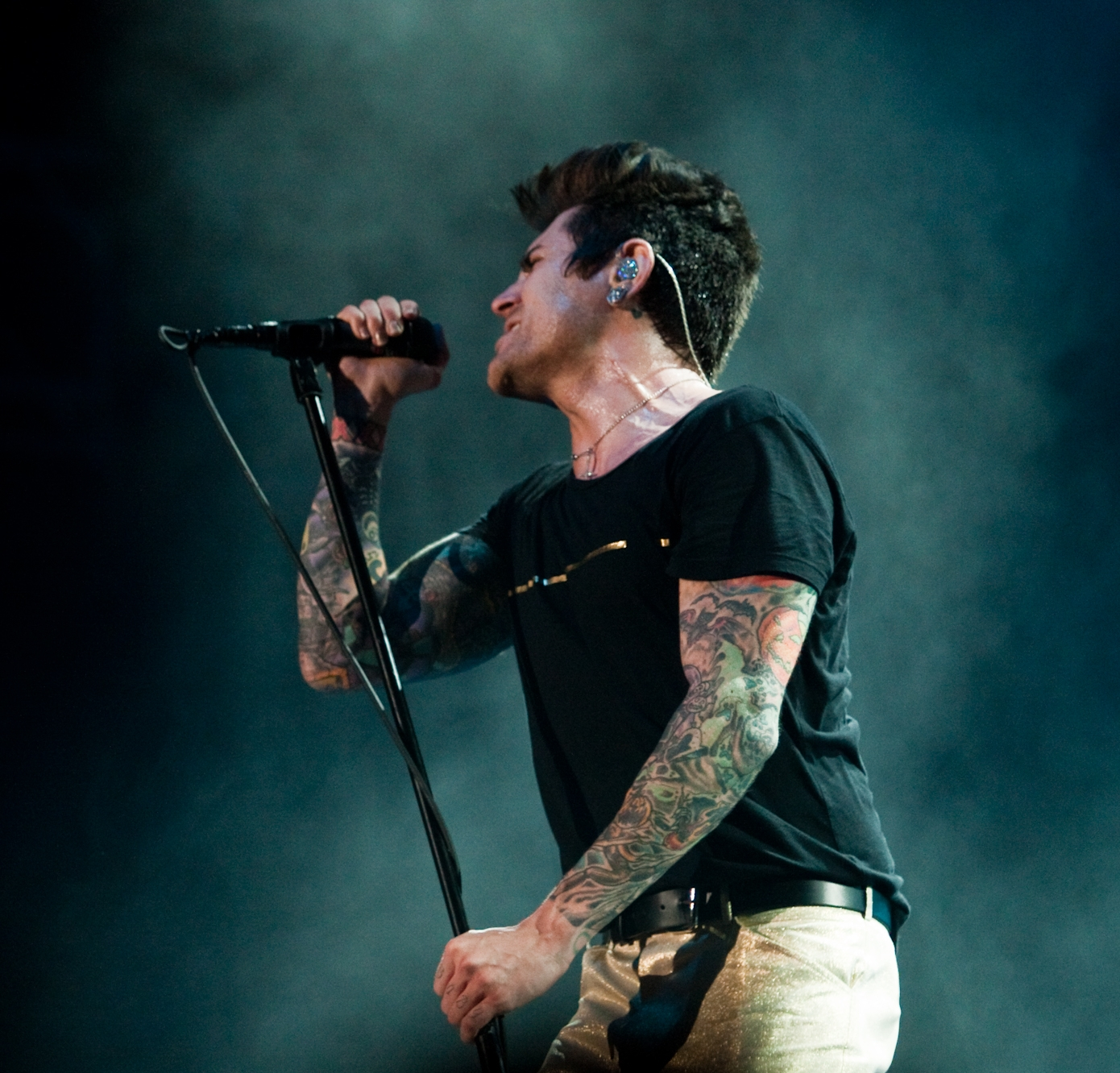
Davey Havok sings in a slightly different style on "Born to Lie" than he does on the rest of Dreamcar.

Musically, "Born to Lie" is an alternative and new wave song with a dance beat. Ben Kaye from Consequence of Sound classified "Born to Lie" and "Kill for Candy" as alternative and new wave songs, which he said contradicts a claim Stefani once made that Dreamcar is a punk band. He compared the former to the works of the Killers due to its usage of "heavy guitars". Tom Breihan from Stereogum contrasted "Born to Lie" with "Kill for Candy", feeling that the former leans more towards "efficient modern rock" territory. Despite calling the song upbeat, Zanda Wilson of Music Feeds considered it "a tad darker" than the predecessor. On the song, Dumont plays the guitar and keyboards, Kanal performs on bass guitar and keyboards, and Young plays the drums. The three reunited with No Doubt member Gabrial McNair for "Born to Lie", who contributes to the instrumentation as a keyboardist. Because of the addition of "moody keyboard hues" on the song, AllMusic's Matt Collar called it reminiscent of Depeche Mode.

"Born to Lie" is set in common time, and has a moderate tempo of 140 beats per minute. The key of the song is in F-sharp minor and it advances with a setup of two verses, each followed by a pre-chorus and chorus. For the song, Havok's vocal range follows the chord progressions of Fm-B-E-D-A in both the verses and choruses. A critic from KYSR discussed the progression of the song, noting that it "builds from a breathy verse into an expansive refrain". Brandi Smith from Riff Magazine wrote that although Havok sings in a new style on "Born to Lie" in contrast with the rest of Dreamcar, the lyrical component remains the same. The lyrics find him "unable to love or connect emotionally" with someone else; he sings in a whining tone: "I'd love to love you, just a little / I'd love to be moved, just a little." Rolling Stone's Ryan Reed analyzed the lyrics "I've grown too tired to lie / And you're born so sick of truth" and believed they tell of a "would-be romance ruined by practicality".

== Critical reception ==
Some music critics discussed Dreamcar members and their different roles in making "Born to Lie". Havok's "brooding" songwriting was acclaimed by Pitchfork's Zoe Camp, who wrote that it "blossoms spectacularly" on the song. Breihan stated that if it were not for Havok's "yelpy, dramatic delivery", then "Born to Lie" would have been classified as a "fairly anonymous piece of movie-trailer rock" song. Although Consequence of Sound's Collin Brennan found the song to be derivative of "I Ran (So Far Away)" (1982) by A Flock of Seagulls, he believed Dumont and Young's performances provide "enough oomph to steer it away from self-parody". Caitlyn Ralph from Alternative Press provided a positive review of the song, labeling it "a dream come true" in the wake of the album's announcement. In his review of the single, Reed referred to it as frenetic.

== Track listing ==
Digital download/streaming
| No. | Title | Length |
|---|---|---|
| 1. | "Born to Lie" | 3:50 |

== Credits and personnel ==
Credits adapted from Tidal.

- Tom Dumont – composer, lyricist, guitar, keyboards
- Davey Havok – composer, lyricist, vocals
- Tony Kanal – composer, lyricist, bass guitar, keyboards
- Adrian Young – composer, lyricist, drums
- Tim Pagnotta – producer
- Ted Jensen – mastering engineer
- Mark Stent – mixing engineer
- Adam Hawkins – recording engineer
- Brian Phillips – recording engineer
- Michael Freeman – assistant engineer
- Peter Mack – assistant engineer
- Gabrial McNair – keyboards

== Release history ==
Release dates and formats for "Born to Lie"
| Region | Date | Format(s) | Label | Ref. |
|---|---|---|---|---|
| United States | April 7, 2017 | Digital download; streaming | Columbia | |
