= Dreamcar (album) =

Studio album by Dreamcar
- Released: May 12, 2017
- Studios: Henson Recording Studios (Hollywood); Rancho Pagzilla (North Hollywood)
- Genres: New wave; synth-pop
- Length: 39:10
- Label: Columbia
- Producer: Tim Pagnotta

Dreamcar chronology
Dreamcar (2017)	Dream EP (2024)

Singles from Dreamcar
- 1. "Kill for Candy" Released: March 2, 2017; 2. "All of the Dead Girls" Released: July 2017

Dreamcar is the debut studio album by the American supergroup Dreamcar, consisting of AFI's Davey Havok and No Doubt's Tom Dumont, Tony Kanal, and Adrian Young. It was released on May 12, 2017, through Columbia Records, and produced by Tim Pagnotta.

Dreamcar was preceded by the release of lead single "Kill for Candy" and several promotional singles. Dreamcar promoted the single with a music video and through televised performances in the United States. "All of the Dead Girls" was chosen as the album's second single in July. Dreamcar received generally favorable reviews from music critics, who highlighted Havok's role and the album's contrast from No Doubt and AFI releases. Commercially, the album underperformed, reaching number 115 on the main Billboard 200 chart in the United States, and the top 20 on both the Top Alternative Albums and Top Rock Albums charts.

== Background and inspiration ==
Dreamcar is an American supergroup, consisting of AFI's lead vocalist Davey Havok and No Doubt members Tony Kanal, Tom Dumont, and Adrian Young. Absent from the latter group is lead singer Gwen Stefani, who was releasing music as part of her solo career. The album was recorded at Henson Recording Studios in Hollywood and Rancho Pagzilla in North Hollywood.

== Music and lyrics ==
In contrast to their rock-focused musical explorations as No Doubt and AFI, Dreamcar is a new wave and synth-pop project. The lyrics are romantic, and are directed at Havok's current and prior personal relationships. Regarding the album's sound, he referred to it as representative of his musical beginnings and considered it an "adolescent time capsule of sorts".

== Release and promotion ==
Worldwide, Dreamcar was digitally released for paid download and streaming on May 12, 2017, through Columbia Records. Physically, the album was distributed as a CD and LP. Exclusively through Newbury Comics, Dreamcar signed a limited amount of LP copies to be placed for sale.

Dreamcar made several live appearances to promote the album. They appeared on the April 18, 2017 episode of Jimmy Kimmel Live! to perform "Kill for Candy" and "All of the Dead Girls". On May 11, 2017, they also performed "Kill for Candy" on The Late Late Show with James Corden. Furthermore, the group embarked on a tour to promote the album. Brittany Woolsey from OC Weekly called their Santa Ana concert energetic, and noted that the group seemed to be enjoying themselves. While promoting, Havok's physical appearance was considered muted compared to his previous goth or rock and roll looks.

=== Singles ===
Dreamcar was preceded in release by several of its songs. Lead single "Kill for Candy" was released on March 2, 2017, as the group's debut single and first song. (Note: "Kill for Candy" was released to digital retailers on March 2, 2017, but Apple Music erroneously lists March 4, 2017 as the release date instead.) In the United States, it was sent to modern rock radio stations for airplay, and a promotional CD single was distributed in Europe by RCA Records and Sony Music. The accompanying music video was directed by Frank Borin and acts as a memorialization of the founding of Dreamcar. "Kill for Candy" is the group's only song to be featured on a record chart in the United States, reaching numbers 28 and 35 on Billboard's Alternative Airplay and Rock Airplay charts, respectively. On April 7, 2017, the group released "Born to Lie", the album's first promotional single, and debuted its lyric video.

"All of the Dead Girls" was released as the second promotional single from Dreamcar on April 14, 2017. Later, the song was chosen as the album's second commercial single, and distributed to modern rock radio stations in July. A music video for the single was planned, and in August 2017, prior to singing "All of the Dead Girls" at The Conservatory in Santa Ana, Havok told the audience that the live performance would be recorded and used for that purpose. "On the Charts" was the selected as the album's final promotional release, and premiered on May 5, the week before the release of Dreamcar.

== Reception ==
Professional ratings
Aggregate scores
Source	Rating
Metacritic	71/100
Review scores
Source	Rating
AllMusic	4/5 stars
Consequence of Sound	B−
Pitchfork	5.8/10
PunkNews.org	3/5 stars
Rock Sound	8/10

Dreamcar received mostly favorable reviews from music critics. At Metacritic, which assigns a normalized rating out of 100 to reviews from mainstream publications, the album received an average score of 71 which signifies "generally favorable reviews", based on 5 reviews.

Matt Collar from AllMusic said it is a vibrant debut album that benefitted from Havok's "distinctly sharp-witted, punk-informed energy"; he summarized: "Ultimately, while Dreamcar's debut surely exists as a byproduct of No Doubt and Havok's various successes, the album stands on its own, magnified by each bandmember's most charismatic elements." Also impressed by Havok's performance was Collin Brennan, a writer for Consequence of Sound, who felt he is entirely committed as the group's frontman. He called the album "altogether more welcome" than new No Doubt or AFI releases, and highlighted "Kill for Candy", "On the Charts", and "All of the Dead Girls" as its essential songs. Rock Sound's David McLaughlin praised Dreamcar as a "modern-day supergroup" that "the world didn't realize it was missing". He also enjoyed the group's genre fusion of "disco, funk and hot gothic" music. Brandi Smith from Riff Magazine predicted that No Doubt and AFI fans may dislike the album's 1980s influence, but found it to be a "wonderful nod" to the era that is simultaneously "something new".

Providing a mixed review, Renaldo69, of PunkNews.org, spoke of Dreamcar's track listing, saying that it begins on a charming note, but "it does end up a bit boring toward the end"; ultimately, he enjoyed the album, considering it a risk "but one everyone involved can afford". Zoe Camp from Pitchfork considered Dreamcar to be a "simple labor of love", separating it from similar supergroup releases. However, she questioned Havok's songwriting abilities on songs like "All of the Dead Girls" and "On the Charts", which she felt had some "lyrical setbacks". Mikael Wood of the Los Angeles Times felt Dreamcar's attempt to harness a "modern pop-punk sound" portrayed them as followers, which he said is "an especially unflattering look given that they actually lived through the period they're revisiting."

=== Chart performance ===
Dreamcar underperformed compared to other albums in the same genre, like After Laughter by Paramore. However, it entered several Billboard albums charts in the United States. On the all-genre Billboard 200 chart, the album debuted at number 115 on the issue dated June 3, 2017, only performing for 1 week. It fared higher on the component Album Sales and Current Album Sales charts, peaking at numbers 32 and 30, respectively. On the genre-exclusive, Top Alternative Albums and Top Rock Albums charts, it reached positions 12 and 20, respectively, also spending 1 week each.

== Track listing ==
Dreamcar track listing
No.	Title	Length
1.	"After I Confessed"	3:30
2.	"Kill for Candy"	2:54
3.	"Born to Lie"	3:50
4.	"On the Charts"	2:48
5.	"All of the Dead Girls"	3:31
6.	"Ever Lonely"	3:31
7.	"The Assailant"	2:33
8.	"The Preferred"	3:39
9.	"Slip on the Moon"	4:00
10.	"Don't Let Me Love"	3:12
11.	"Do Nothing"	3:37
12.	"Show Me Mercy"	3:45
Total length:		39:10

Notes:

- All tracks written by Tom Dumont, Davey Havok, Tony Kanal and Adrian Young, and produced by Tim Pagnotta

== Credits and personnel ==
Credits adapted from Tidal.

- Tom Dumont – composer, lyricist, guitar, keyboards, background vocals (tracks 1, 5, 6, 9)
- Davey Havok – composer, lyricist, vocals
- Tony Kanal – composer, lyricist, bass guitar, keyboards, background vocals (tracks 1, 5, 6, 9)
- Adrian Young – composer, lyricist, drums, background vocals (tracks 1, 5, 6, 9)
- Tim Pagnotta – producer
- Ted Jensen – mastering engineer
- Mark Stent – mixing engineer
- Adam Hawkins – recording engineer (all except tracks 2 and 4)
- Brian Phillips – recording engineer
- Michael Freeman – assistant engineer
- Peter Mack – assistant engineer (all except tracks 2 and 4)
- Gabrial McNair – keyboards (all except tracks 2 and 4)
- Scheila Gonzalez – saxophone (tracks 5, 8, 12)

== Charts ==
Chart performance for Dreamcar
Chart (2017)	Peak position
US Billboard 200	115
US Top Alternative Albums (Billboard)	12
US Top Rock Albums (Billboard)	20

== Release history ==
Release dates and formats for Dreamcar
Region	Date	Format(s)	Label	Ref.
Various	May 12, 2017	CD; digital download; LP; streaming	Columbia	
