= The Beacon Street Collection =

Studio album by No Doubt
- Released: March 25, 1995
- Recorded: 1993–1994
- Studios: Clear Lake Audio (Los Angeles, CA); Total Access Recording (Redondo Beach, CA); York Street Studios (Auckland, New Zealand); Home Recordings (Fullerton, CA)
- Genres: Ska; punk rock; grunge
- Length: 41:02
- Labels: Beacon Street; Sea Creature; Interscope (reissue)
- Producer: No Doubt

No Doubt chronology
| No Doubt (1992) | The Beacon Street Collection (1995) | Tragic Kingdom (1995) |

Singles from The Beacon Street Collection
- 1. "Squeal" Released: May 12, 1994; 2. "Doghouse" Released: Late 1994

The Beacon Street Collection is the second studio album by American rock band No Doubt. It was released independently on March 25, 1995, through the band's label Beacon Street Records. Produced by the band and recorded in a homemade studio in the garage of their house on Beacon Avenue in Anaheim, California, from which the album takes its name, The Beacon Street Collection was released during a period when the band was receiving little attention from their label Interscope Records, and were not getting a chance to record a second album, as the label was disillusioned with them after the commercial failure of their 1992 eponymous debut. No Doubt had written large numbers of songs and knew that they would not make it onto any Interscope album, so they built their own studio and recorded the album there. Two singles were released: "Squeal" and "Doghouse".

The album sold over 100,000 copies, over three times as many as their first album sold. Its success ensured that Interscope financed the band's third album Tragic Kingdom, which was a massive success, selling 16 million copies worldwide and attracting extensive interest in the band. The Beacon Street Collection was re-released in 1997 by Interscope as part of the band's back catalog.

== Background ==
No Doubt released their self-titled debut album in 1992, a year after being signed to Interscope. The group's blend of upbeat brass-dominated songs and funk-style bass riffs came at a time when most of the United States was in the thrall of grunge music, a genre whose angst-ridden lyrics and dirty sound could not have contrasted more with the atmosphere of most of the songs on No Doubt's pop-oriented album. Not surprisingly, the band lost out to the now-ubiquitous grunge music and the album was a commercial failure, with only 30,000 copies sold. In the words of the program director of KROQ, a Los Angeles radio station on which it was one of the band's driving ambitions to be played: "It would take an act of God for this band to get on the radio." The band started to work on its second album in 1993 but Interscope, having lost faith in the band, rejected most of its material.

== Music ==
A large number of songs on The Beacon Street Collection were written by Eric Stefani, who left the group before their third album was released. This gave the album a similar sound to their first album, No Doubt, in which Eric had collaborated in the writing of all the songs.

=== Production ===
No Doubt became frustrated at the lack of progress they were making with Interscope, who were proving unreliable in their support of the band. Instead, they built their own studio in their garage on Beacon Avenue in Anaheim, California Although the band had knowledge that they didn't want any songs to be released in an Interscope-distributed album, they recorded The Beacon Street Collection in their studio and Clear Lake Audio in one long weekend. Their independence shocked their company representative, Tony Ferguson, who had assumed they were recording a third single.

=== Singles ===
"Squeal" (1994)
The album's first single, self-released by the band in 1994.

In 1994, before recording of the album had even begun, No Doubt released two seven-inch singles for their fans. The first was "Squeal", a song written by Eric Stefani, detailing a criminal's reaction to her partner's betrayal to the police. They had agreed to be "in this together" but, after he "squeals", she resolves to "kill the narc who wrote it and said it [that she was guilty of a crime]". The single's B-side was "My Room Is Still Clean", written by Tony Kanal and recorded live at the Icehouse in Fullerton, California on February 13, 1993.

The second single was "Doghouse", written by Eric Stefani. It is about a man who is bullied and dominated by his girlfriend and is unwilling to force the situation to change. The song uses the metaphor of a dog and its master to illustrate the nature of the relationship, saying that she had got him "by the reins" and he has been "conditioned" by her. The single's B-side was "You Can't Teach an Ol' Dog New Tricks", written by Eric Stefani.

== Reception ==
Professional ratings
Review scores
| Source | Rating |
|---|---|
| AllMusic | 3/5 stars |
| Blender | 4/5 stars |
| Entertainment Weekly | B− |
| Los Angeles Times | 2.5/4 stars |
| The Rolling Stone Album Guide | 2/5 stars |

=== Significance ===
On its original release in March 1995, The Beacon Street Collection was only available in local record stores in Orange County, California and at No Doubt's shows. Its rawer sound proved popular with the band's fans and the band's first batch of one thousand copies sold out within only a few months after its release. Interscope realized the band's potential and allowed them to record their third album, Tragic Kingdom in various Los Angeles studios, "wherever they could get a deal on a studio". During a recording session, the band was introduced to Paul Palmer, who was interested in mixing the new album. He owned his own record label Trauma Records, which was associated with Interscope. Interscope willingly sublicensed the project to Trauma Records in 1995 and Tragic Kingdom got the personal focus that comes from a small company.

By the end of the year, 100,000 copies of The Beacon Street Collection had been sold, over three times as many as their first album, No Doubt. These sales were mostly due to the release of Tragic Kingdom, which was released seven months after The Beacon Street Collection in October 1995. Tragic Kingdom was a massive commercial success, reaching sales of over 10 million in the United States and 16 million worldwide, peaking at number one on several charts and being certified Diamond (10,000,000 units) in the US and Canada and Platinum in the UK and Australia. This success created an extensive interest in the band's back catalog so, in October 1997, The Beacon Street Collection was re-released on Interscope.

In an interview with Axcess Magazine in April 1996, Gwen Stefani described the release of The Beacon Street Collection as "one of the best things [they] ever did because [they] were able to take some songs that would have probably gotten lost and document them".

=== Critical ===
AllMusic called the album "finer than the [band's] debut", and described it as containing more of a "raw sound inspired [...] by punk" than the style of No Doubt's first album, which was heavily "synth and new wave". Entertainment Weekly, in 1997, called it "more focused than Tragic Kingdom" with "reggae frat-house grooves and perky horns", and complimented "Gwen's feisty Kewpie-doll wail" and the "swaying ballads", attributing it to "the band's willing spirit". Rock on the Net retrospectively called the album "a raw expression of their sound" and describing it as "80s punk with 90s grunge.

== Track listing ==
| No. | Title | Writer(s) | Length |
|---|---|---|---|
| 1. | "Open the Gate" | Eric Stefani; Gwen Stefani; Tom Dumont; Tony Kanal; Adrian Young | 3:40 |
| 2. | "Blue in the Face" | E. Stefani | 4:35 |
| 3. | "Total Hate '95" (featuring Bradley Nowell of Sublime) | John Spence; Chris Leal; Gabriel Gonzalez; Bradley Nowell | 3:18 |
| 4. | "Stricken" | E. Stefani; Kanal; G. Stefani; Dumont | 4:06 |
| 5. | "Greener Pastures" | Kanal; G. Stefani | 5:05 |
| 6. | "By the Way" | Dumont; G. Stefani | 4:29 |
| 7. | "Snakes" | Kanal; G. Stefani | 4:37 |
| 8. | "That's Just Me" | Eric Keyes; E. Stefani | 4:08 |
| 9. | "Squeal" | E. Stefani | 2:38 |
| 10. | "Doghouse" | E. Stefani | 4:26 |

== Credits ==
=== Personnel ===
- Gwen Stefani – vocals
- Tom Dumont – guitar
- Tony Kanal – bass
- Adrian Young – percussion, drums
- Eric Stefani – keyboard

Additional personnel

- Phil Jordan – trumpet
- Gabe McNair – trombone
- Eric Carpenter – saxophone on "That's Just Me" & "Squeal"
- Gerard Boisse – saxophone on "Doghouse"
- Bradley Nowell – vocals on "Total Hate"

=== Production ===
- Producer: No Doubt
- Engineers: Ray Blair, Tom Dumont, Colin "Dog" Mitchell
- Mixing: Tom Dumont, Nicholas Hexum, Colin "Dog" Mitchell, No Doubt, Scott Ralston, Adrian Young
- Mixing assistants: Nick Hexum, Scott Ralston, Adrian Young
- Mastering: Robert Vosgien
- Advisor: Albhy Galuten
- Design: Gwen Stefani
- Layout design: Matt Wignall
- Liner notes: No Doubt

== Release history ==
| Country | Date | Label | Format | Catalog |
|---|---|---|---|---|
| United States | 1995 | Beacon Street Records | CD | 3 |
| | 1997 | Sea Creature Records/Interscope | CD | 90156 |

All information is from the AllMusic page and No Doubt's official website discography.
