= Kill for Candy =

Single by Dreamcar

from the album Dreamcar
- Released: March 2, 2017
- Genre: New wave
- Length: 2:56
- Label: Columbia
- Songwriter(s): Tom Dumont; Davey Havok; Tony Kanal; Adrian Young
- Producer(s): Tim Pagnotta

Dreamcar singles chronology
"Kill for Candy" (2017)	"All of the Dead Girls" (2017)

Music video
- "Kill for Candy" on YouTube

"Kill for Candy" is the debut single by American supergroup Dreamcar for their self-titled debut album from 2017. The song was produced by Tim Pagnotta and written by the group's four members: Tom Dumont, Davey Havok, Tony Kanal, and Adrian Young. It was released as the album's lead single on March 2, 2017, through Columbia Records. Following Dreamcar's formation, "Kill for Candy" was one of the first four songs the quartet wrote together. It is a new wave song that was influenced by the music of the 1980s and compared to the releases of English bands New Order and A Flock of Seagulls, as well as Havok's own work with AFI and Blaqk Audio.

"Kill for Candy" received positive to mixed reviews from music critics and it was called one of the best songs off of Dreamcar. Other reviewers referred to the song as forgettable or dismissed the lyrics. In the United States, the song reached numbers 35 and 28 on Billboard's Rock Airplay and Alternative Airplay charts, respectively. The accompanying music video was directed by Frank Borin and released in April 2017. It was filmed in Los Angeles, through the use of wearable cameras, and captures the band's daily lives. A second version of the video was released afterwards, allowing viewers to change their point-of-view depending on the Dreamcar member. In 2017, the group performed the song on Jimmy Kimmel Live! and The Late Late Show with James Corden.

== Background and release ==
Dreamcar is an American supergroup, consisting of AFI's lead vocalist Davey Havok and No Doubt members Tony Kanal, Tom Dumont, and Adrian Young. No Doubt's vocalist Gwen Stefani resumed work on her solo career, leaving No Doubt to partake in the creation of a side project. "Kill for Candy" was one of the first four songs that Havok wrote with the group. He said that songs like "After I Confessed" and "Kill for Candy" were deeply inspirational and "touched on aspects of [his] musical upbringing" that he had previously ignored. Upon hearing the unfinished demos for these songs in May 2014, Havok recalled that the lyrics then came very easily to him. He then recorded his vocals for the track within four days, and returned to Dumont, Kanal, and Young to share his progress. "Kill for Candy" was produced by Tim Pagnotta and written by Havok, Kanal, Dumont, and Young. Long-time collaborator Mark Stent mixed the song, with Ted Jensen serving as the mastering engineer.

"Kill for Candy" was released as a single for digital download and streaming in various countries on March 2, 2017, through Columbia Records. On the same day, California radio outlet KROQ-FM was the first to spin the song as part of its release to modern rock radio stations in the United States. Additionally, an animated promotional lyric video was uploaded to the group's YouTube account. It serves as the lead single to their debut album, Dreamcar, which was released on May 12, 2017. According to Dumont, the song was chosen as their first single as the band felt it was representative of their overall sound. Additionally, Kanal referred to the song as the best way to introduce their fans to Dreamcar. In 2017, a promotional CD single, intended for radio airplay, was distributed throughout and printed in Europe in 2017 by RCA Records and Sony Music.

== Composition and lyrics ==
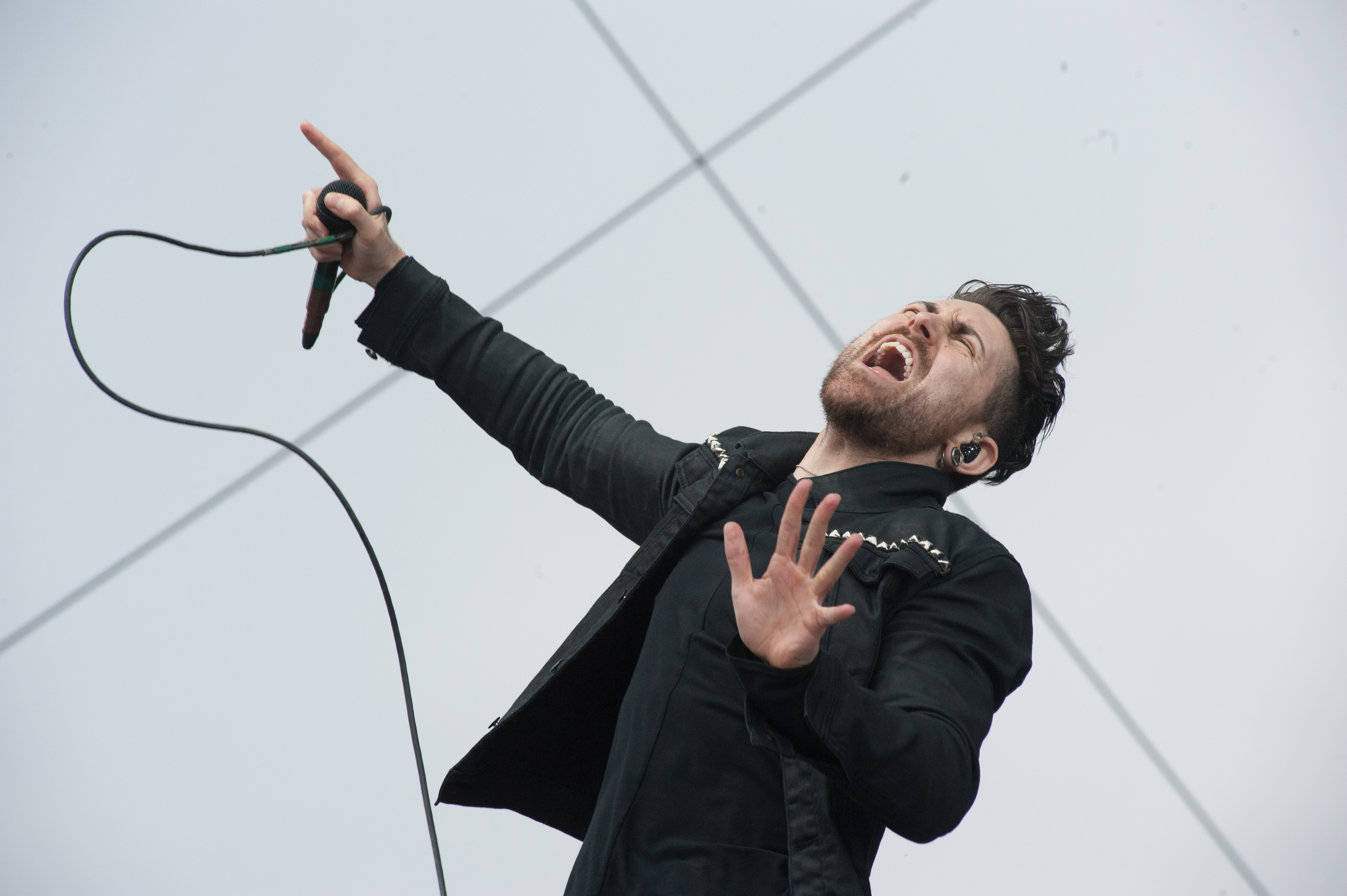
After being played a demo of "Kill for Candy", Davey Havok recorded his vocals within four days, in a process he referred to as rather easy and natural.

"Kill for Candy" is an upbeat 1980s-influenced new wave song. It has a "propulsive groove" and "soaring chorus" according to Dan Esptein from Rolling Stone. Zoe Camp from Pitchfork compared Kanal, who plays bass guitar on the song, to New Order's Peter Hook for his performance. Collin Brennan of Consequence of Sound said the song's '80s-sound fell within the New Romantic movement and compared it to English band A Flock of Seagulls. Orange County Register's Kelli Skye Fadroski considered Havok to be singing in an "'80s-rock" style that she said he had only briefly experimented with while a part of AFI and the American duo Blaqk Audio. The song's instrumentation is provided solely by Dreamcar; Dumont plays the guitar and keyboards, Kanal performs on bass guitar, and Young plays the drums and keyboards.

"Kill for Candy" is set in the time signature of common time, and has a relatively fast tempo of 160 beats per minute. The key of the song is in A-sharp major and it advances with a setup of two verses, each followed by a refrain. Havok's vocal range follows the chord progressions of Am–C–G-Em in the verses and C-Em-C-Am-Em-G in the chorus. Havok said the lyrics to "Kill for Candy" revolve around his "unhealthy desire for the sweet". According to Brennan, the song contains similar "sexy and dangerous" lyrics, which he found reminiscent to those of AFI, specifically Havok's frequent use of homonyms. Brandi Smith, a writer for Riff Magazine, felt its lyrical message involved "loss and the final things you say to the person you're leaving behind", specifically the lyrics "What's on our tongues is less discreet / Before it dissolves, it's oh so sweet".

== Reception ==
"Kill for Candy" received praise from music critics for its hook, while other technical aspects of the song, such as its lyrics and '80's-influence, were criticized. AllMusic's Matt Collar referred to it as a "hooky, infectious anthem [...] worthy of building a whole album around". A staff member from PunkNews.org called "Kill for Candy" one of the three opening highlights from Dreamcar with an "addictive hook" and impressive performance from Kanal. It was labeled an album standout by Dan Hyman from Chicago Tribune. Fadroski said that with "Kill for Candy", Dreamcar proved themselves as "an obvious passion project" rather than a clone of No Doubt or AFI. In a mixed review, Brennan disliked some of the song's lyrics, calling them "groan-worthy", specifically the refrain's "Miss you misunderstand me" line; he did, however, enjoy the song's dangerous and sexy sound. Mikael Wood of the Los Angeles Times was more critical, calling it "expertly arranged" but ultimately forgettable aside from its "stylistic accuracy".

In the US, "Kill for Candy" entered two Billboard radio charts. It debuted on the Rock Airplay chart at number 49 on the publication dated March 25, 2017, serving as the week's second highest new entry. It re-entered during the week of April 29 at number 50, and climbed to a peak of number 35 on May 26. On the Billboard Alternative Airplay chart, a component chart of Rock Airplay, the song reached a slightly higher peak at number 28. In their annual list, WEQX 102.7 said "Kill for Candy" was one of the station's 102.7 most played songs of 2017.

== Music video ==
The music video for "Kill for Candy" premiered on April 3, 2017, via the band's Vevo account on YouTube. Directed by Frank Borin, the video was filmed the month before its release and serves as a memorialization of the creation of Dreamcar. The group wore rigged, wearable cameras on their heads to create the video, which captured footage of their day-to-day lifestyles. Kanal told Fadroski that forming a concept for the video was challenging, as he felt most of their ideas had already been used while working with No Doubt. A "Kill for Candy" behind-the-scenes video was uploaded to the group's Vevo account on April 28, 2017. An interactive, second version of the music video, allowing the viewer to change their point-of-view between Dumont, Havok, Kanal and Young, premiered on April 14, 2017, alongside the promotional release of "All of the Dead Girls" from Dreamcar.

The main video was filmed in Los Angeles, with moments taking place at a local coffeehouse and alongside the Melrose Avenue shopping district. It also documents the group making the video itself. The video opens showing the members' individual point-of-view shots; Dumont is ordering coffee, Young is readying his drum kit, Kanal is driving to the shoot, and Havok is selecting his wardrobe backstage. They eventually meet up together to perform the song. One scene in the clip features Dreamcar eating at the Crossroads Kitchen vegan restaurant, at the exact table where Kanal, Dumont, and Young met Havok for the first time. The video ends with Havok following a woman and departing the restaurant. The video was called colorful by Yahoo! Finance's Lyndsey Parker, while Tom Breihan from Stereogum discussed Havok's attire in the video, noting his lack of black clothing and comparing his mustache to that of American director John Waters. Daniel Kreps from Rolling Stone found the video to be "immersive [and] innovative".

== Live performances ==
During an interview with Billboard, Havok revealed he was most excited to perform "Kill for Candy" from Dreamcar. On the April 18, 2017 episode of Jimmy Kimmel Live!, Dreamcar made their first televised appearance, performing both "Kill for Candy" and the parent album's second single, "All of the Dead Girls". American keyboardist Scheila Gonzalez appears as a special guest for their performance, which was also posted to the series' YouTube channel. The day before the release of Dreamcar, the group played "Kill for Candy" on The Late Late Show with James Corden. In August 2017 at The Conservatory in Santa Ana, California, Dreamcar used the song as the show's finale, and Brittany Woolsey of OC Weekly commented: "although well-known and played by now, [the song] still inspired the crowd to sing, dance along and beg for more."

== Track listing ==
Digital download/promotional CD single/streaming
No.	Title	Length
1.	"Kill for Candy"	2:56

== Credits and personnel ==
Credits adapted from Tidal.

- Tom Dumont – composer, lyricist, guitar, keyboards
- Davey Havok – composer, lyricist, vocals
- Tony Kanal – composer, lyricist, bass guitar
- Adrian Young – composer, lyricist, drums, keyboards
- Tim Pagnotta – producer
- Ted Jensen – mastering engineer
- Mark Stent – mixing engineer
- Brian Phillips – recording engineer
- Michael Freeman – assistant engineer

== Charts ==
Chart performance for "Kill for Candy"
Chart (2017)	Peak position
US Rock & Alternative Airplay (Billboard)	35

== Release history ==
Release dates and formats for "Kill for Candy"
Region	Date	Format(s)	Label(s)	Ref.
Various	March 2, 2017	Digital download; streaming	Columbia	(Note: "Kill for Candy" was released to digital retailers on March 2, 2017, but Apple Music erroneously lists March 4, 2017 as the release date instead.)
United States	March 2, 2017	Modern rock radio	Columbia	
Europe	2017	Promotional CD single	RCA; Sony Music	
