= No Doubt (No Doubt album) =

Studio album by No Doubt
- Released: March 17, 1992
- Recorded: January 1990–January 1992
- Studio: A&R Recording Studios (Hollywood, CA)
- Genre: Ska; pop
- Length: 46:08
- Label: Interscope; Atlantic
- Producer: Dito Godwin; No Doubt

No Doubt chronology
No Doubt (1992)	The Beacon Street Collection (1995)

Singles from No Doubt
- 1. "Trapped in a Box" Released: February 25, 1992

No Doubt is the debut studio album by American rock band No Doubt, released on March 17, 1992, by Interscope Records, with distribution from Atlantic Recording Corporation. It was originally recorded as an independent release, but was re-recorded after the band signed with Interscope. It was produced by Dito Godwin and recorded in Los Angeles.

The album was released during a period of popularity for grunge music, an aggressive rock style which contrasted with No Doubt's upbeat sound. Despite strong audience reaction to the band's tours, album sales under-performed expectations and sold about 30,000 copies, and received mixed reviews. Interscope refused to fund the release of a single from the album, so No Doubt released the single "Trapped in a Box" independently.

The band independently released their second album The Beacon Street Collection in 1995, which had a better commercial performance, selling 100,000 copies. Interscope then financed and supported their third album Tragic Kingdom (1995).

== Background ==
John Spence, Eric Stefani, and Eric's sister Gwen formed the band as Apple Core in 1986, having worked together at a local Dairy Queen. They played small gigs around the Orange County area, with Spence's on-stage antics carrying its performances. Tony Kanal went to one of these early shows and soon joined the band as its bassist. After initially rejecting her advances, he began dating Gwen, but they kept their relationship secret for a year, feeling that it was an unspoken rule that nobody date her.

In December 1987, Spence died by suicide several days before the band was to play a gig at The Roxy Theatre for record industry employees. No Doubt disbanded but decided to regroup after several weeks with Alan Meade taking over vocals. When Meade left the band, Gwen replaced him as lead singer, while No Doubt continued to develop a live following in California. In early 1988, Tom Dumont left Rising, a heavy metal band of which he was a member with his sister, stating that local metal bands "were into drinking, wearing Spandex" but that he wanted to focus on music. He joined No Doubt and replaced Jerry McMahon as the band's guitarist, adding a metal influence to its sound. Adrian Young replaced Chris Webb as drummer the following year.

Impressed by the presence of stage diving at ska concerts and Gwen's on-stage presence, Tony Ferguson signed the band to a multi-album deal with the newly created Interscope Records in 1991.

== Music ==
=== Production ===
In 1991, No Doubt were signed to Interscope Records, which was then a new label. The band had just finished recording an indie CD that they were going to release themselves. When they were signed by the record label, they decided to accept the offer to re-record the CD in a professional studio. However, they weren't receiving any support that they expected:

"And we thought we were recording in a really good studio," "But looking back, we were naive. It was almost like an independent release, anyway – there was no push for the record [by Interscope] and no kind of support at all. Everything we did on that record, we did ourselves.

The band spent less than $13,000 recording their debut album, featuring both songs written as long ago as 1987 and new songs written specifically for the disc. All of the band members continued going to school to finish their education while recording their debut album in a Los Angeles studio.

To promote their album, in the summer of 1992 the band went on two two-week tours of the Western area of the United States. In the fall, they embarked on a two-and-a-half month national tour. Because the album underperformed commercially, Interscope refused to support the tour, leaving the band to finance it themselves. They played alongside bands such as Rage Against the Machine, Ugly Kid Joe, Sublime, Dance Hall Crashers, 311, Public Enemy, Pato Banton and The Special Beat.

=== Singles ===
"Trapped in a Box" (1992)
A sample from the only single released from the album.

After the disappointing sales of No Doubt, Interscope declined to finance the release of a single from the record. Thus, the band self-financed the shooting of a video for the song "Trapped in a Box", spending roughly $5,000 on it. The video got local airplay in Orange County but, despite the band's hopes, it was never aired on either MTV or VH1, although it was played on MuchMusic in Canada. It failed to achieve status on any chart. In 2003 the song was released on No Doubt's greatest hits compilation album The Singles 1992-2003 and the video was released on the companion DVD of music videos, The Videos 1992-2003.

Within the booklet from The Singles 1992–2003 is a blurb on each song. The short paragraph on "Trapped in a Box" states:

The oldest track in this collection, "Trapped in a Box" is the sole representative of No Doubt's eponymous major label debut and a good barometer for their development. Beginning as a poem Tom wrote for school, bandleader at the time Eric Stefani then shaped the arrangement with everyone contributing lyrics. Together for six years when recorded, the band had moved beyond their ska roots. The horn section and quasi-ska rhythms remain inspired by those early Madness/Fishbone influences, while the emerging sense of flow and pop bounce makes the track a benchmark for the time and a notable milestone today. Ostensibly their first official single, "Trapped" was admittedly too out there for the radio of the time. It wasn't aggressively promoted and largely fell upon deaf ears in a world enthralled with an "alternative revolution" mainly centered on male aggression. That changed soon enough.

The song is based on a poem that guitarist Tom Dumont wrote about addiction to television and how it can control one's mind. 19.5degs described the song as "skiffling" and "the weakest track [on The Singles 1992–2003] in the way of singing, but [with] smart lyrics". Music OMH, however, described the song as a "kooky, almost novelty single" and CD Universe described the song as a "rhythmic workout". Rhapsody, in a positive review, described it as "one of the album's highlights" and AllMusic called it "as exciting" as two of No Doubt's more successful singles, "Hella Good" and "Just a Girl".

== Reception ==
Professional ratings
Review scores
Source	Rating
AllMusic	2.5/5 stars
Blender	3/5 stars
The Rolling Stone Album Guide	2/5 stars

=== Significance ===
The group's ska sound contrasted greatly with the popular music genre in the US at the time, grunge music. The album was a commercial failure, with only 30,000 copies sold. In the words of the program director of KROQ, a Californian radio station on which it was one of the band's driving ambitions to be played: "It would take an act of God for this band to get on the radio."

The lack of record company support frustrated the band and led the band to self-produce their next album, The Beacon Street Collection, in a home-made studio, causing them to abandon the slick pop sound desired by Interscope for a more punk style. Their independence shocked their record company representative Tony Ferguson and the album sold over 100,000 copies in 1995, the year of its release, over three times as many as No Doubt sold. To capitalize on this success, Interscope offered the band extensive help with their third album, Tragic Kingdom, under the division Trauma Records to which the band was signed.

The success of their third album, Tragic Kingdom, led to fans becoming interested in the band's earlier albums, No Doubt and The Beacon Street Collection, and many more copies of them were manufactured and sold. The Beacon Street Collection was re-released in October 1997 as part of the band's back catalog and, by the summer of 1997, No Doubt had sold 250,000 copies.

=== Critical ===
Yahoo! Music reviewer, Bill Holdship, called the album "a rather nondescript ska-pop effort". AllMusic gave the album a mixed review, calling it "a polished production". It described the music on the album as "pop-oriented", with "new wave keyboards and punchy brass proving a foil to the basic ska framework", and complimented Gwen Stefani's "extroverted" vocals. Rhapsody also gave the album a positive review, albeit retrospectively, calling it "a far cry from the radio pop [the band] became known for". It described the music as "bright, colorful, fun" and Gwen Stefani's vocals as "strong".

== Track listing ==
No.	Title	Writer(s)	Length
1.	"BND"	Eric Stefani; Tony Kanal	0:45
2.	"Let's Get Back"	E. Stefani; Kanal; Gwen Stefani; Tom Dumont	4:11
3.	"Ache"	E. Stefani	3:48
4.	"Get on the Ball"	E. Stefani; G. Stefani	3:32
5.	"Move On"	E. Stefani; G. Stefani; Kanal; Dumont; Adrian Young	3:55
6.	"Sad for Me"	E. Stefani; G. Stefani	1:59
7.	"Doormat"	E. Stefani; G. Stefani; Kanal	2:26
8.	"Big City Train"	E. Stefani; G. Stefani; Kanal; Dumont	3:56
9.	"Trapped in a Box"	E. Stefani; G. Stefani; Kanal; Dumont	3:24
10.	"Sometimes"	E. Stefani; G. Stefani; Kanal; Dumont	4:29
11.	"Sinking"	E. Stefani	3:20
12.	"A Little Something Refreshing"	E. Stefani	1:18
13.	"Paulina"	E. Stefani; Gabe Gonzalez; Chris Leal	2:30
14.	"Brand New Day"	E. Stefani; Kanal	3:15

== Credits ==
=== Personnel ===
No Doubt

- Gwen Stefani – lead vocals
- Eric Stefani – keyboards, backing vocals
- Tom Dumont – guitars
- Tony Kanal – bass
- Adrian Young – drums, percussion

Additional musicians

- Eric Carpenter – saxophone
- Don Hammerstedt – trumpet
- Alex Henderson – trombone

=== Production ===
- Producers: No Doubt, Dito Godwin
- Engineer: Michael Carnevale
- Dave Collins – Mastering
- Arrangers: No Doubt
- Horn arrangements: Don Hammerstedt
- Art direction: Kimberly Holt
- Design: Kimberly Holt
- Photography: Chris Cuffaro

== Charts ==
Chart performance for No Doubt
Chart (1997)	Peak position
Australian Albums (ARIA)	196

== Certifications ==
Region	Certification	Certified units/sales
Canada (Music Canada)	Gold	50,000^{^}
^{^} Shipments figures based on certification alone.

== Release history ==
Country	Date	Label	Format	Catalog
United States	1992	Interscope	LP	92109-1
			CD	92109-2
			CS	92109-4
			CS	92109
		Atlantic	CD	92109

All information is from the AllMusic page.
