= Dreamcar =

American new wave supergroup

- Origin: Los Angeles, California, United States
- Genres: New wave; synth-pop
- Years active: 2016–2017; 2023–present
- Labels: Columbia
- Spinoff of: AFI; No Doubt
- Members: Davey Havok; Tony Kanal; Tom Dumont; Adrian Young

Dreamcar (stylized as DREAMCAR) is an American new wave supergroup from Los Angeles, California. The band consists of Davey Havok, best known as the lead singer of AFI, along with Tony Kanal (bass), Tom Dumont (guitar) and Adrian Young (drums), all the members of No Doubt except for Gwen Stefani.

== Background and musical style ==
In February 2016, representatives for the then-unnamed group confirmed to Billboard that No Doubt's instrumental members – Tony Kanal, Tom Dumont and Adrian Young – were joining forces with AFI frontman Davey Havok in a new band. They had already finished recording their debut album and were looking for a label to release it on. At the time, Gwen Stefani was a judge on The Voice and promoting a new solo album, This Is What the Truth Feels Like. Havok reiterated that he was not "replacing" Stefani or singing for No Doubt.

In November 2016, the project revealed its name, Dreamcar.

Dreamcar's first single "Kill for Candy" premiered on March 2, 2017. A video for the song was released on April 3, 2017. Their self-titled debut album was released on May 12, 2017.

On May 6, 2023, Dreamcar reunited for a surprise set at the 11th Annual Musack Rock & Roll Carnival in Los Angeles. On April 2, 2024, the band announced the release of the Dream EP, which released on April 5 and featured a cover of David Bowie's "Moonage Daydream". Later that year, they played the Cruel World Festival in Pasadena, California.

== Band members ==
- Davey Havok – lead vocals
- Tony Kanal – bass
- Tom Dumont – guitar
- Adrian Young – drums, percussion

=== Touring members ===
- Scheila Gonzalez – keyboards, saxophone, backing vocals
- Ijeoma Njaka – backing vocals
- Dessy Di Lauro – backing vocals

=== Former touring members ===
- Gabrial McNair – keyboards, saxophone, backing vocals

== Discography ==
=== Studio albums ===
Title	Details	Peak chart positions	
Title	Details	US	US Rock
Dreamcar	Released: May 12, 2017; Label: Columbia, PLOF; Format: LP, CD, streaming	115	20

=== EPs ===
- Dream EP (2024)

=== Singles ===
List of singles as lead artist, with selected chart positions and album name
Title	Year	Peak chart positions		Album
Title	Year	US Alt. Air.	US Rock Air.	Album
"Kill for Candy"	2017	28	35	Dreamcar
"All of the Dead Girls"	2017	—	—	Dreamcar
"—" denotes a title that did not chart, or was not released in that territory.

=== Promotional singles ===
List of promotional singles as lead artist, with album name
Title	Year	Album
"Born to Lie"	2017	Dreamcar
"On the Charts"	2017	Dreamcar
