= Music of Lightning Returns: Final Fantasy XIII =

Music from the video game Lightning Returns: Final Fantasy XIII

The music for the 2013 action role-playing game Lightning Returns: Final Fantasy XIII, developed and published by Square Enix, was composed by Masashi Hamauzu, Naoshi Mizuta, and Mitsuto Suzuki. Hamauzu was the leader composer for XIII and XIII-2, and Mizuta and Suzuki previously composed music for XIII-2. Musicians who had previously worked with the composers on XIII-2 and The 3rd Birthday worked on the project in Japan, while the main soundtrack was performed and recorded in Boston by the Video Game Orchestra, conducted by Shota Nakama. Along with including more percussion and ethnic elements, the soundtrack used "Blinded by Light", the main theme for main character Lightning, as a leitmotif. Unlike the previous XIII games, the soundtrack did not include a theme song, as the composers felt it would detract from the emotional impact of the ending.

Three albums have been released: the promotional Lightning Returns: Final Fantasy XIII Pre Soundtrack in July 2013, the Lightning Returns: Final Fantasy XIII Original Soundtrack in November, and Lightning Returns: Final Fantasy XIII Soundtrack Plus in March 2014. The music has received a mostly positive response from reviewers. The main soundtrack, despite some tracks being critiqued, was generally praised as a good selection of music and a fitting conclusion to the music of the Final Fantasy XIII series. It was also praised by reviewers of the game as a whole. The Soundtrack Plus album was reviewed less favorably. Both commercial albums sold well enough to be placed on the Oricon charts, with the Original Soundtrack reaching #29 and remaining on the charts for four weeks.

== Concept and creation ==
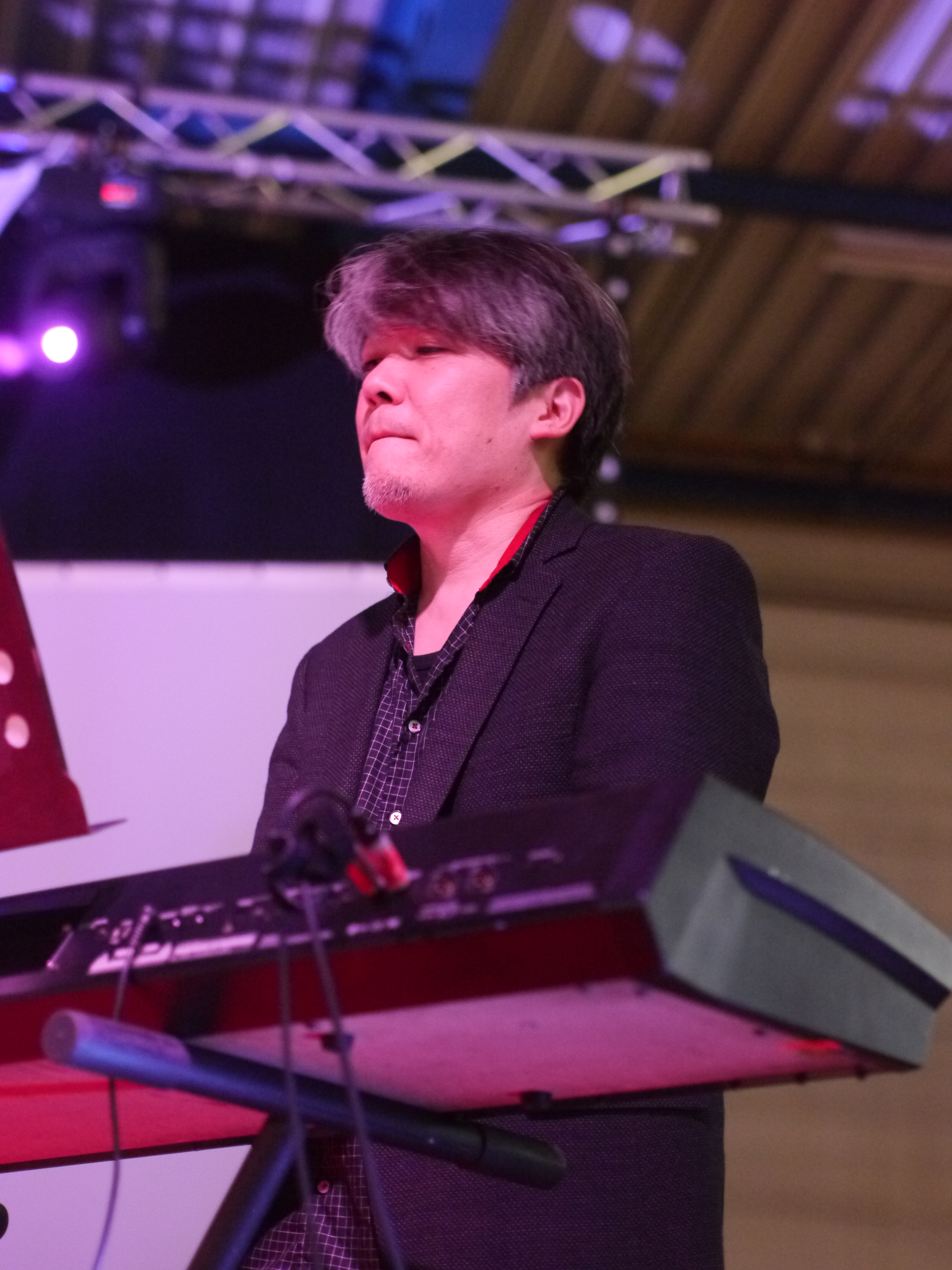
Composer Masashi Hamauzu in 2012.

The music of Lightning Returns was composed by Masashi Hamauzu, who composed the music for Final Fantasy XIII, Naoshi Mizuta and Mitsuto Suzuki, who co-composed the music for Final Fantasy XIII-2 with Hamauzu. Japanese band Language was also contracted by Suzuki to help with recording and remixing. Several of the musicians in Japan had worked with the composers before on XIII-2 and The 3rd Birthday. Recording took place at the Mixer's Lab recording studios in Tokyo. The Video Game Orchestra, founded by Shota Nakama, was contracted by Hamauzu to perform, record and mix the orchestral music at their studio on Boston. According to Hamauzu, they were his first and only choice for recording the score. Nakama received the final score in April 2013, and Hamauzu was regularly at the studios to help with the recording process. Nakama was told by Hamauzu that he was allowed to do as he wished unless he did something "really wacky", with Hamauzu relying on Nakama and mostly interacting and working on their tracks if he disliked some aspect of them. The orchestra worked on nearly all of Hamauzu's music, including the opening and ending themes.

The score was created with far more percussion than previous entries in the series, and featured "Blinded by Light", a recurring theme in the XIII games related to the series' central character Lightning, as a leitmotif. The theme was meant to emphasize the focus on Lightning, with several tracks relating directly to her. Unspecified ethnic musical elements were also incorporated. Each composer worked on one of the four game's key locations. Due to the game's day-night cycle, different music was composed for morning, afternoon, evening and nighttime. The thirteen-minute-long final boss theme was meant to reference the title's numeral. Hamauzu wrote "Crimson Blitz", the first piece of the score and one of the game's battle themes, while on tour in Switzerland. Unlike the previous two games, Lightning Returns did not feature a theme song as it was felt that this would diminish the emotional impact of the ending. Instead, the composers created a purely orchestral piece. The final theme, "Epilogue", was co-composed by Hamauzu and Nakama. It was based on the concept of the XIII games coming to an end, and so was intended to convey the themes and atmosphere of the soundtrack. Nakama created multiple versions of the piece and sent them to Hamauzu, who performed alterations and made the final choice. The game also featured multiple musical Easter eggs, including tunes from previous entries in the franchise.

== Lightning Returns: Final Fantasy XIII Original Soundtrack ==
Lightning Returns: Final Fantasy XIII Original Soundtrack

Soundtrack album by Masashi Hamauzu, Naoshi Mizuta, Mitsuto Suzuki, & Nobuo Uematsu
- Released: November 21, 2013
- Genre: Video game soundtrack
- Length: Disc 1: 1:17:28; Disc 2: 1:18:23; Disc 3: 1:16:58; Disc 4: 1:14:38; Total: 5:07:27
- Label: Square Enix

The main soundtrack album, Lightning Returns: Final Fantasy XIII Original Soundtrack, was released on four compact discs on November 21, 2013. It was released by Square Enix under the catalog number SQEX-10392~5, and the album features seventy-four tracks spanning 5:07:27. The first disc is devoted to the opening section and the city of Luxerion; the second disc deals with the Dead Dunes and Wildlands; the third covers the city of Yusnaan and important themes leading up to the game's conclusion; the fourth disc covers the final section of the game. Three tracks from the album, "Crimson Blitz", "The Savior", and "Lightning Returns", were digitally released as singles on iTunes. Further samples from the track were released on a disc of Square Enix music sold as a promotion at Tokyo Game Show 2013. Tracks from Lightning Returns, along with XIII and XIII-2, were also included on a special disc released with the Japan-exclusive "Lightning Ultimate box", a package containing all three XIII games. The soundtrack album reached #29 on the Oricon charts and remained on the charts for four weeks.

Reviews of the album have been positive. Derek Heemsbergen of RPGFan praised the consistency of the soundtrack both when compared to XIII-2 and the variety of locations. He said that the recurring motifs in the soundtrack "work to great effect", noting how the tracks related to Lightning helped explore her personality. His highest praise went to the final disc due to "its sheer emotional intensity". Despite the general praise, some tracks, such as "Marimba de Chocobo", came in for minor critiques. Christopher Huynh of Video Game Music Online was also positive, noting the high production values of the album. He also generally praised the themes used both in battle and for the various locations, though he felt that the Dead Dunes tracks were the weakest on the album. His reaction to the new and rearranged characters' themes were more mixed, with him praising "Snow's Theme" while calling "Fang's Theme" a "very odd and jarring failure". The final disc also received high praise, with Huynn saying that it "succeeds at closing out the series on an emotional high".

Reviewers of the game also noted and praised the soundtrack, despite giving more mixed opinions on other aspects of the game. Jeremy Parish, writing for USGamer, called the music "phenomenal from start to finish". Destructoid's Dale North called the music "fantastic, and even more varied than the previous Final Fantasy XIII games". Bradley Hale of Hardcore Gamer was also positive, saying that the music "does an effective job at blending old jams with new ones, with the arrangements of already known songs being interesting, and new tunes coming off as far more inspiring and emotion-filled than those found in XIII-2".

Track list

Disc 1
No.	Title	Writer(s)	Japanese title	Length
1.	"Lightning Returns"	Mitsuto Suzuki & Masashi Hamauzu	"ライトニングリターンズ"	4:40
2.	"The Final 13 Days"	Masashi Hamauzu	"最期の13日"	5:15
3.	"Lightning's Theme – A Distant Glimmer"	Masashi Hamauzu	"ライトニングのテーマ ～遠き光～"	1:56
4.	"Equilibrium"	Naoshi Mizuta	"アンビバレンス"	2:21
5.	"Chaos"	Naoshi Mizuta & Masashi Hamauzu	"混沌"	4:41
6.	"The Ark"	Mitsuto Suzuki	"箱舟"	4:32
7.	"The Evil Savior"	Masashi Hamauzu	"邪なる解放者"	3:23
8.	"The Sleeping City"	Masashi Hamauzu	"眠れる聖都"	3:26
9.	"Luxerion"	Masashi Hamauzu	"光都ルクセリオ"	6:22
10.	"Reverent Souls"	Masashi Hamauzu	"敬虔なる民"	8:22
11.	"Crimson Blitz"	Masashi Hamauzu	"クリムゾンブリッツ"	3:14
12.	"Salvation's Fanfare"	Naoshi Mizuta	"解放のファンファーレ"	1:13
13.	"Sunset Prism"	Masashi Hamauzu	"落陽のプリズム"	6:05
14.	"Midnight Eternal"	Naoshi Mizuta	"エターナルミッドナイト"	5:12
15.	"The Savior's Words"	Mitsuto Suzuki	"解放者の詩"	2:04
16.	"The Cathedral"	Masashi Hamauzu	"ルクセリオ大聖堂"	3:20
17.	"The Warren"	Mitsuto Suzuki	"暗黒街"	4:04
18.	"Noel's Theme – The Shadow Hunter"	Naoshi Mizuta	"ノエルのテーマ ～闇の狩人～"	2:52
19.	"Noel and Yeul – The Promise"	Naoshi Mizuta	"ノエルとユール ～光の約束～"	4:26

Disc 2
No.	Title	Writer(s)	Japanese title	Length
1.	"Desert Awakening"	Mitsuto Suzuki	"砂海の目覚め"	2:28
2.	"The Dead Dunes"	Mitsuto Suzuki	"デッド・デューン ～熱砂の砂漠～"	4:12
3.	"Desert Lullaby"	Naoshi Mizuta	"デザートララバイ"	9:19
4.	"Graveyard of Dreams"	Naoshi Mizuta	"夢果てる地"	5:01
5.	"Bandit Gang Monoculus"	Naoshi Mizuta	"盗賊団モノキュラス"	2:41
6.	"Fang's Theme – The Boss"	Naoshi Mizuta	"ファングのテーマ ～偽りの首領～"	3:12
7.	"Treasures Within"	Mitsuto Suzuki	"聖宝眠る遺跡"	4:28
8.	"The Showdown"	Mitsuto Suzuki	"立ちはだかる者"	3:37
9.	"K.O."	Mitsuto Suzuki	"ノックアウト！"	2:34
10.	"The Last Surviving Wilderness"	Naoshi Mizuta	"最後の大地"	3:39
11.	"The Wildlands"	Naoshi Mizuta	"ウィルダネス"	3:51
12.	"Sunset Path"	Naoshi Mizuta	"夕日の帰り道"	5:43
13.	"Prowlers of the Night"	Naoshi Mizuta	"獣たちの夜"	5:44
14.	"Savior of Souls"	Naoshi Mizuta	"魂の解放者"	4:40
15.	"Bluesy Chocobo"	Nobuo Uematsu	"ブルージーチョコボ"	4:34
16.	"Chocobo Returns"	Nobuo Uematsu	"チョコボリターンズ"	3:53
17.	"Marimba de Chocobo"	Nobuo Uematsu	"マリンバdeチョコボ"	3:20
18.	"A Carefree Existence"	Naoshi Mizuta	"おきらくじんせい"	3:01
19.	"Sazh and Dajh"	Naoshi Mizuta	"サッズとドッジ"	2:26

Disc 3
No.	Title	Writer(s)	Japanese title	Length
1.	"Awaiting the Celebration"	Mitsuto Suzuki	"祝祭を待ちわびて"	4:29
2.	"The Glittering City of Yusnaan"	Mitsuto Suzuki	"享楽の都ユスナーン"	4:27
3.	"City of Revelry"	Mitsuto Suzuki	"きらめきの宴"	3:30
4.	"Ouroboros Festival"	Mitsuto Suzuki	"ウロボロスフィエスタ"	4:44
5.	"High Voltage"	Naoshi Mizuta & Masashi Hamauzu	"ハイボルテージ"	4:52
6.	"Death Game"	Mitsuto Suzuki	"デスゲーム"	5:04
7.	"Chaos Infusions"	Mitsuto Suzuki	"シ界"	2:17
8.	"Lumina's Theme"	Naoshi Mizuta & Masashi Hamauzu	"ルミナのテーマ"	2:24
9.	"Sneaking In"	Naoshi Mizuta	"潜入大作戦"	4:18
10.	"Snow's Theme – Final Words"	Naoshi Mizuta	"スノウのテーマ ～遺言～"	3:22
11.	"The Song of the Savior – The Chosen One"	Masashi Hamauzu	"解放者の伝説 ～選ばれし乙女～"	2:24
12.	"The Song of the Savior – Grand Finale"	Masashi Hamauzu	"解放者の伝説 ～グランドフィナーレ～"	2:05
13.	"Yusnaan Palace"	Naoshi Mizuta	"ユスナーン宮殿"	3:27
14.	"Army of One"	Naoshi Mizuta	"シーンドライブ"	2:13
15.	"Overclock"	Mitsuto Suzuki	"オーバークロック"	0:33
16.	"The Coliseum – Fearsome Warriors"	Mitsuto Suzuki	"闘技場 ～荒ぶる魂～"	3:20
17.	"Chocobo Carnivale"	Naoshi Mizuta	"チョコボカーニバル"	4:04
18.	"Nova Chrysalia"	Mitsuto Suzuki	"ノウス＝パルトゥス"	3:58
19.	"Endless Lives"	Naoshi Mizuta	"エンドレスライフ"	3:41
20.	"The Angel's Tears"	Mitsuto Suzuki	"天使の涙"	4:01
21.	"Lightning's Theme – Radiance"	Masashi Hamauzu	"ライトニングのテーマ ～孤光～"	3:48
22.	"Meeting You"	Mitsuto Suzuki	"あなたに会えて"	3:57

Disc 4
No.	Title	Writer(s)	Japanese title	Length
1.	"Beginning of the End"	Masashi Hamauzu	"終焉の始まり"	3:28
2.	"Altar of Light"	Mitsuto Suzuki	"光輝の拝殿"	3:22
3.	"The Soulsong"	Masashi Hamauzu	"忘却(レテ)の禊"	4:08
4.	"A New World"	Masashi Hamauzu	"新しい世界へ"	6:44
5.	"A Sacred Oratorio"	Masashi Hamauzu	"聖譚の賛歌"	2:06
6.	"The Divine Dream"	Mitsuto Suzuki	"神の視た夢"	3:23
7.	"Cosmogenesis"	Mitsuto Suzuki	"コスモジェネシス"	3:44
8.	"Divine Love"	Naoshi Mizuta	"神の愛を誉れとせよ"	4:16
9.	"Almighty Bhunivelze"	Mitsuto Suzuki	"至高神ブーニベルゼ"	13:05
10.	"Last Resort"	Mitsuto Suzuki	"ラストリゾート"	3:49
11.	"Claire Farron"	Naoshi Mizuta	"エクレール・ファロン"	3:31
12.	"Humanity's Tale"	Masashi Hamauzu	"神話の終わり、人の物語"	10:30
13.	"Credits – Light Eternal"	Masashi Hamauzu, Naoshi Mizuta, & Mitsuto Suzuki	"エンディングロール ～終わりなき閃光～"	10:46
14.	"Epilogue"	Masashi Hamauzu	"エピローグ"	1:46

== Lightning Returns: Final Fantasy XIII Original Soundtrack Plus ==
Lightning Returns: Final Fantasy XIII Original Soundtrack Plus

Soundtrack album by Masashi Hamauzu, Naoshi Mizuta, Mitsuto Suzuki, Nobuo Uematsu, & Hiroshi Kaneko
- Released: March 26, 2014
- Genre: Video game soundtrack
- Length: 1:13:31
- Label: Square Enix

A bonus album, Lightning Returns: Final Fantasy XIII Soundtrack Plus, was released on March 26, 2014. The album features remixes of tracks from the main album or tracks present in the game that were not released on the album. The remixes were done by Mizuta, Suzuki, Kengo Tokusashi, Wollny Andreas, Hiroshi Kaneko. Released under the catalog number SQEX-10430, the album features 25 tracks with a total running time of 1:13:31. The album reached #211 on the Oricon charts, remaining there for one week.

RPGFan's Neal Chandran was mostly negative regarding the album. He called the majority of tracks "just plain boring", while he felt that the more exciting tunes "lack punch". Some pieces such as "Captive Saint" he called "superficially pretty, but that's really it", while the remixes of music pieces by Uematsu he called "brief, but awful". Huynh shared many points of criticism with Chandran, finding multiple tracks boring as they were just slight variations on tracks from the main soundtrack album, though some tracks such as "Dying World" and the piano version of "Serah's Theme" were praised.

Track list
No.	Title	Writer(s)	Japanese title	Length
1.	"Lightning Returns (special trailer ver.)"	Mitsuto Suzuki	ライトニングリターンズ – special trailer ver.	1:31
2.	"High Voltage (game ver.)"	Naoshi Mizuta & Masashi Hamauzu	ハイボルテージ – game ver.	3:32
3.	"The Captive Saint"	Naoshi Mizuta & Masashi Hamauzu	囚われの聖女	4:54
4.	"Sazh and Dajh (complete mix)"	Naoshi Mizuta	サッズとドッジ – complete mix	3:46
5.	"Death Game (synthesizer ver.)"	Mitsuto Suzuki	デスゲーム – synthesizer ver.	3:43
6.	"Desert Lullaby (instrumental)"	Naoshi Mizuta	デザートララバイ – instrumental	7:36
7.	"Snow's Theme – Final Words (complete mix)"	Naoshi Mizuta & Masashi Hamauzu	スノウのテーマ ～遺言～ – complete mix	6:27
8.	"Lost Souls – Caius & Yeul"	Naoshi Mizuta	救えぬ魂 ～カイアスとユール～	4:18
9.	"A Dying World"	Naoshi Mizuta	終わりゆく世界	3:18
10.	"The Dead Dunes (live edit ver.)"	Mitsuto Suzuki	デッド・デューン ～熱砂の砂漠～ – live edit ver.	4:21
11.	"The Ark (soundtrack exclusive ver.)"	Mitsuto Suzuki	箱舟 – soundtrack exclusive ver.	2:53
12.	"Serah's Theme (piano ver.)"	Masashi Hamauzu	セラのテーマ – piano ver.	2:17
13.	"Soul Seeds"	Naoshi Mizuta	ソウルシード	1:20
14.	"Lightning Returns (aggressive mix)"	Mitsuto Suzuki	ライトニングリターンズ – aggressive mix	0:57
15.	"The Onslaught"	Naoshi Mizuta	魔襲	0:50
16.	"Final Fantasy (Yusnaan ver.)"	Nobuo Uematsu	Final Fantasy – ユスナーン ver.	2:27
17.	"Eternal Winds – The Dead Dunes (Japanese ver.)"	Nobuo Uematsu	悠久の風 – デッド・デューン – Japanese ver.	2:59
18.	"Battle at the Big Bridge (Yusnaan ver.)"	Nobuo Uematsu	ビッグブリッヂの死闘 – ユスナーン ver.	0:55
19.	"Terra's Theme (Biggs & Wedge ver.)"	Nobuo Uematsu	ティナのテーマ – ビッグス＆ウェッジ ver.	0:58
20.	"A Home Far Away"	Mitsuto Suzuki	いつかのふるさと	1:33
21.	"Ballad of a Vagabond"	Hiroshi Kaneko	旅人のバラッド	1:59
22.	"Eternal Winds – The Dead Dunes (English ver.)"	Nobuo Uematsu	悠久の風 – デッド・デューン – English ver.	2:51
23.	"The Savior's Words (Japanese ver.)"	Mitsuto Suzuki	解放者の詩 – Japanese ver.	1:56
24.	"The Savior's Words – Christmas in Nova Chrysalia"	Mitsuto Suzuki	解放者の詩 ～ノウス=パルトゥスのクリスマス～	5:50
25.	"Innkeeper"	Naoshi Mizuta	宿屋	0:20

== Lightning Returns: Final Fantasy XIII Pre Soundtrack ==
Lightning Returns: Final Fantasy XIII Pre soundtrack

Soundtrack album by Masashi Hamauzu, Naoshi Mizuta & Mitsuto Suzuki
- Released: July 13, 2013
- Genre: Video game soundtrack
- Length: 26:28
- Label: Square Enix

A promotional album, Lightning Returns: Final Fantasy XIII Pre Soundtrack, was released on July 13, 2013. It contains six tracks from the game, three of which did not yet have an official title. The other three were the tracks that had then received a digital release. The album was available at a special Square Enix event at United States of Odaiba 2013 as a limited promotion for Lightning Returns.

Track list
No.	Title	Writer(s)	Japanese title	Length
1.	"Crimson Blitz"	Masashi Hamauzu	Crimson Blitz	2:36
2.	"The Savior"	Naoshi Mizuta	魂の解放者	2:39
3.	"Lightning Returns"	Mitsuto Suzuki and Masashi Hamauzu	ライトニングリターンズ	4:44
4.	"Lightning Returns: Final Fantasy XIII BGM04"	Masashi Hamauzu	Lightning Returns: Final Fantasy XIII BGM04	2:09
5.	"Lightning Returns: Final Fantasy XIII BGM05"	Naoshi Mizuta	Lightning Returns: Final Fantasy XIII BGM05	7:34
6.	"Lightning Returns: Final Fantasy XIII BGM06"	Mitsuto Suzuki	Lightning Returns: Final Fantasy XIII BGM06	6:50
