= Gabrial McNair =

American musician

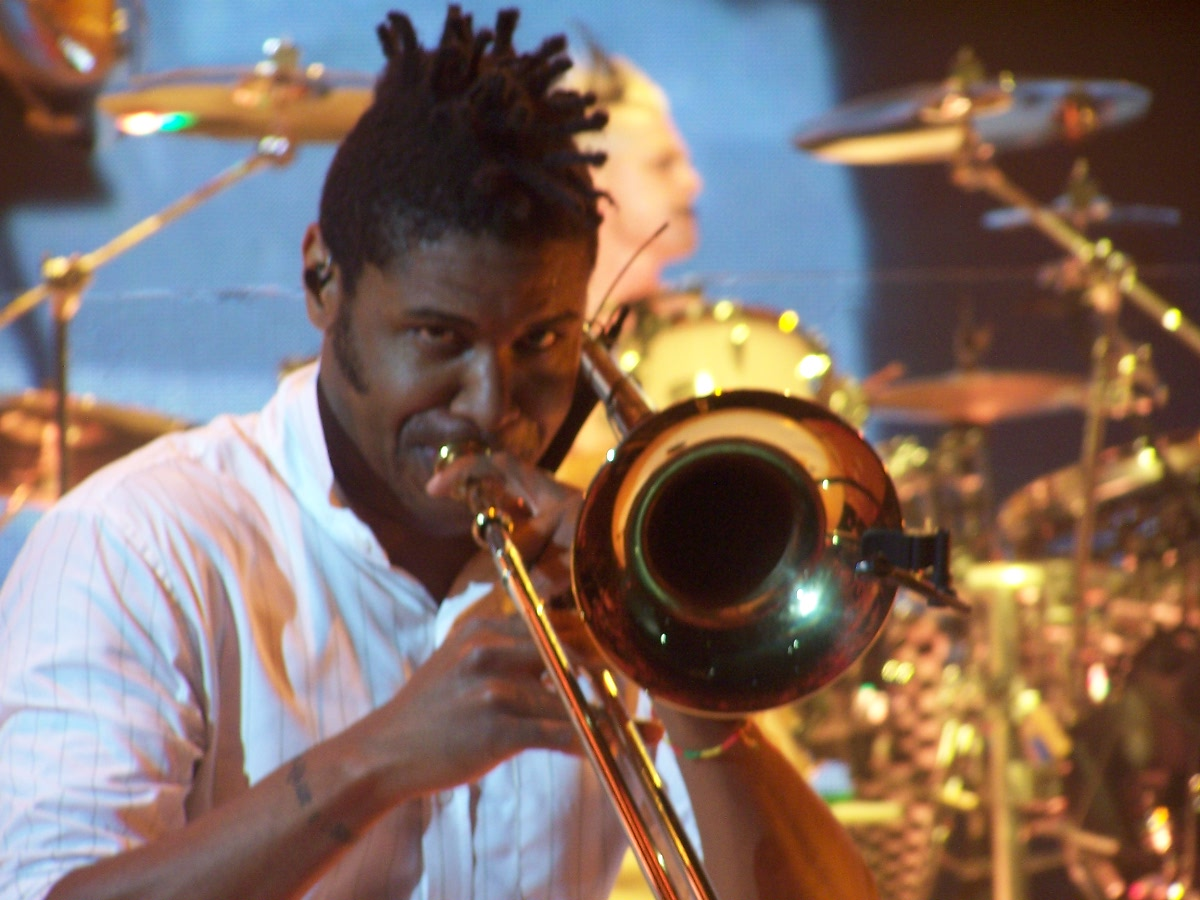
- Gabrial McNair performing on Summer Tour 2009

Background information
- Born: September 8, 1973 (age 53)
- Genres: Rock, ska, shoegaze, reggae, punk rock, jazz, classical
- Instruments: Trombone, keyboards, saxophone, guitar, vocals, drums
- Years active: 1993–present
- Website: gabrialmcnair.com

Gabrial McNair (born September 8, 1973) is a musician and composer, most famous for his work in No Doubt since 1993 as a trombonist, keyboardist, and backing vocalist. He recorded and toured with Green Day during the Nimrod and Warning tours, playing trombone and tenor saxophone. In 2003, he was one of the co-founders of the California-based rock band Oslo where he plays the guitar.

In October 2025, No Doubt announced it would reunite in 2026 for a six show residency in Las Vegas.

== Early life and studies ==
McNair attended Glendora High School in Glendora, California. He played trombone in the marching band and snare drum in the Scottish Pipe Band. After graduation, he went on to study Jazz and Music Composition at Citrus College, before moving on to California Institute of the Arts to continue his studies with Charlie Haden, Alex Iles, Joe LaBarbera, and David Roitstein.

== Collaborations ==
Outside of No Doubt, he has written and recorded with bandmate/producer, Tony Kanal, in the studio on various recordings for Elan Atias, Gwen Stefani, and Pepper.

Gabrial composed additional music for the 2012 animated TV series "Action Dad", as well as the main title theme.

Gabrial collaborated with Garbage frontwoman, Shirley Manson on a song for the 2014 feature film "Dark Hearts" Directed by Rudolf Buitendach

In 2014, Gabrial contributed additional music to the score of the children's animated feature "The Hero of Color City" with Zoë Poledouris and Angel Roche.

McNair has also composed music for various TV shows including Cartoon Network Asia's, "The Afterschool Adventures of Paddle Pop" and "Animal Control".

== With Oslo ==
His band Oslo, which includes Mattia Borrani on lead vocals and Kerry Wayne James on bass, with McNair on guitars, toured with Blue October in the Fall of 2006 on the Foiled Tour in the US and Canada.

Oslo released their second full-length album, called The Rise and Fall of Love and Hate, in 2007.

Oslo released an EP titled "The Morning After" in 2017.

On April 9, 2017, Oslo opened for Dreamcar, a band featuring members of No Doubt and the lead singer of AFI at the Great American Music Hall in San Francisco, and at the Roxy Theatre in West Hollywood.

== Appearances ==
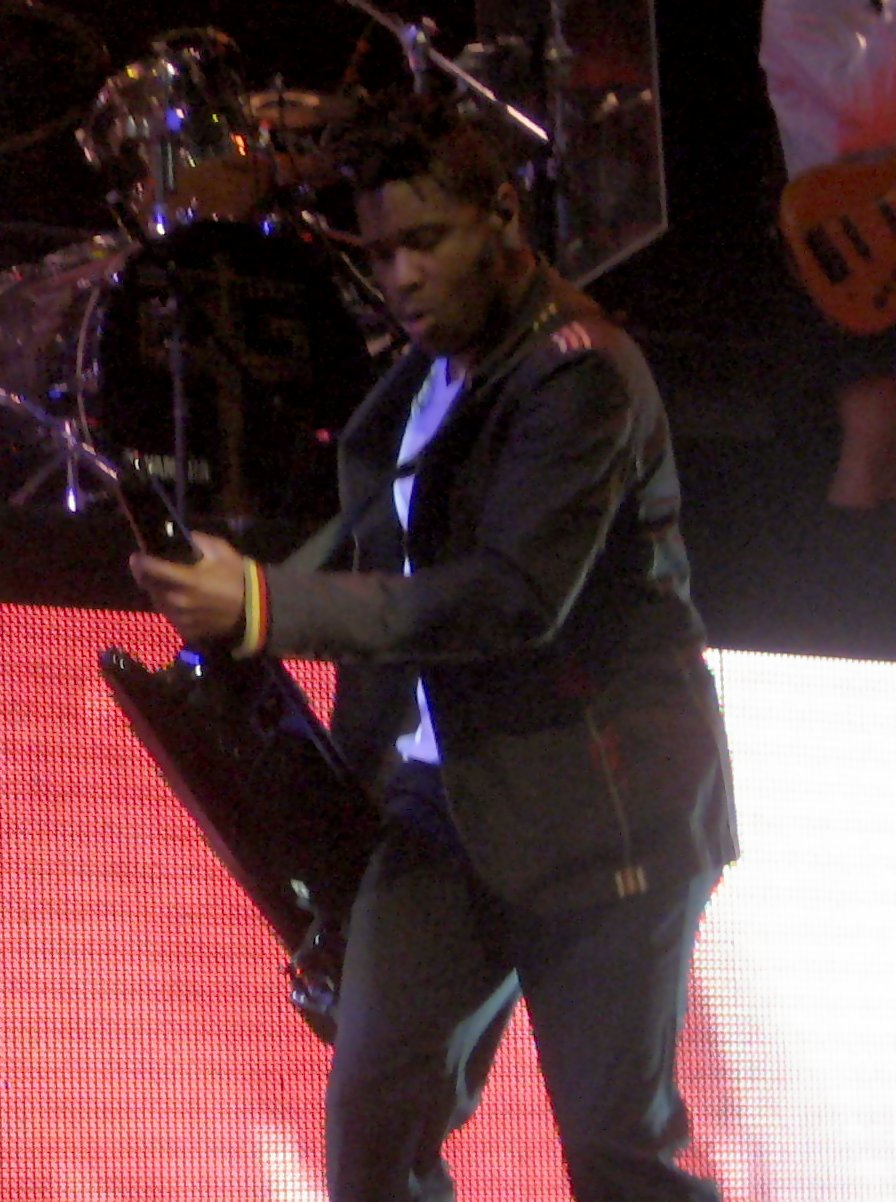
McNair performing on the 2007 Sweet Escape Tour.

In the late 2005, McNair went on tour with fellow band member Gwen Stefani on her solo Harajuku Lovers Tour. He joined Gwen once again on "The Sweet Escape Tour" in 2007. He continues to perform with Miss Stefani on her Las Vegas Residency "Just a Girl" at the Planet Hollywood Casino, as well as other various performances.

He joined the Smashing Pumpkins on their 20th Anniversary Tour in 2008, playing the trombone, backing vocals, and percussion.

He also joined Lenny Kravitz on his "Black and White America World Tour" in 2011 & 2012, playing the trombone and percussion.

In 2013, he lent his vocals to the track "Desert Lullaby" on the original soundtrack of Lightning Returns: Final Fantasy XIII, composed by Naoshi Mizuta. The soundtrack was released on November 21, the same day as the release of the game in Japan; the North American and European release followed in early 2014.

In 2016, he began touring and playing keyboards for the band Tegan and Sara alongside drummer Brendan Buckley, and Bassist Eva Gardner. He joined them on their 2016 world tour in support of their new record Love You To Death. He also continued performing with Tegan and Sara on the 10th Anniversary tour celebrating their classic album The Con.

Since 2017, McNair has toured with Sublime with Rome, providing keyboards, trombone, and backing vocals. He also contributed to their 2019 album Blessings.

== Selected discography ==
- Beacon Street Collection (No Doubt, 1995)
- Tragic Kingdom (No Doubt, 1995)
- A Very Special Christmas 3 (Various, 1997)
- Hang-Ups (Goldfinger, 1996)
- Nimrod (Green Day, 1997)
- The Nixons (The Nixons, 1997)
- Americana (The Offspring, 1998)
- Rugrats: The Movie (Original Soundtrack, 1998)
- Hitler Bad, Vandals Good (The Vandals, 1998)
- Showoff (Showoff, 1999)
- Darrin's Coconut Ass: Live from Omaha (Goldfinger, 1999)
- Senza Motiva (Senza Motiva, 1999)
- Playmate of The Year (Zebrahead, 2000)
- Return of Saturn (No Doubt, 2000)
- Atomic (Lit, 2001)
- Destination Unknown (Mest, 2001)
- Rock Steady (No Doubt, 2001)
- Tune In, Tokyo... (Green Day, 2001)
- Action Figure Party (Action Figure Party, 2001)
- Clear (The Color Red, 2002)
- Thank You, Uncle Tom (Caramelize, 2003)
- 50 First Dates (Original Soundtrack, 2004)
- Everything in Time: B-Sides, Rarities, Remixes (No Doubt, 2004)
- True Love (Toots & the Maytals, 2004)
- Lit (Lit, 2005)
- One Love (Kimberley Locke, 2005)
- Disconnection Notice (Goldfinger, 2005)
- Look at All the Love We Found: A Tribute to Sublime (Various, 2005)
- Oslo (Oslo, 2005)
- Wikked Lil' Grrrls (Esthero, 2005)
- Together as One (Elan, 2006)
- Harajuku Lovers Live (Gwen Stefani, 2006)
- No Shame (Pepper, 2006)
- Songs We Sing (Matt Costa, 2006)
- The Sweet Escape (Gwen Stefani, 2006)
- The Rise and Fall of Love and Hate (Oslo), 2007
- The Greatest Remixes (Good Charlotte, 2008)
- Pilar Diaz (Pilar Diaz, 2009)
- Glee (Glee: The 3D Concert Movie, 2011)
- Push and Shove (No Doubt, 2012)
- Man on the Run (Bush, 2014)
- The Hero of Color City (Zöe Poledouris, 2014)
- Sorry I'm Late (Cher Lloyd, 2014)
- Shine (Gwen Stefani, 2015)
- Rocks & Straws (Anneli Drecker, 2015)
- The Morning After EP (Oslo (band), 2016
- Dreamcar (Dreamcar, 2017)
- Mass Manipulation (Steel Pulse, (2019)
- Blessings (Sublime with Rome, 2019)
- "Forwards Bound" (Single) (Iya Terra feat. Steel Pulse, 2021)
