= Adrian Young =

American drummer (born 1969)

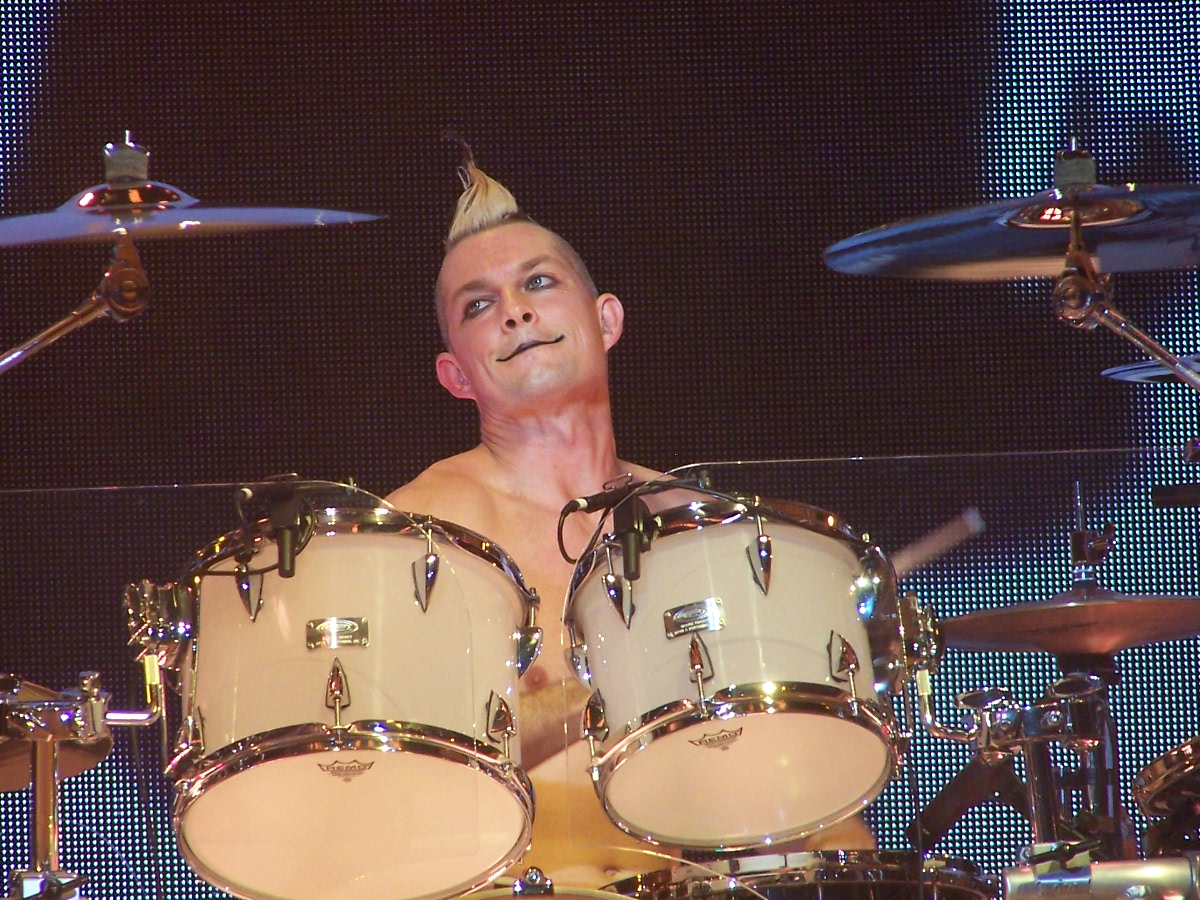
- Young with No Doubt at the Milwaukee Summerfest, July 2009.

Background information
- Born: Adrian Samuel Young; August 26, 1969 (age 57); Long Beach, California, U.S.
- Genres: Ska punk; pop rock; new wave; alternative rock; pop-punk
- Occupations: Musician; songwriter; producer
- Instrument: Drums
- Years active: 1987–present
- Member of: No Doubt; Dreamcar

Adrian Samuel Young (born August 26, 1969) is an American musician, best known as the drummer of the rock bands No Doubt and Dreamcar. He also serves as a producer in his free time.

== Biography ==
Young is an avid golf player who considers himself a scratch golfer. He has played in celebrity golf tournaments such as the Michael Jordan Invitational, Alice Cooper Foundation Tournament and others. Young has participated in VH1's Fairway to Heaven numerous times.

== Reunion with No Doubt ==
In 2009, No Doubt made an appearance on the television series Gossip Girl, playing a fictional band called "Snowed Out" in the episode "Valley Girls". They performed their cover version of the Adam and the Ants song "Stand and Deliver".

In October 2025, No Doubt announced they would reunite in 2026 for a six show residency in Las Vegas.

== Personal life ==
In October 1999, Young proposed to his girlfriend Nina Kent on stage during a No Doubt concert. They were married in January 2000. The couple had a son, Mason, in 2002 and a daughter, Magnolia, in 2011. He and his wife delivered their stillborn daughter, Ruby, in 2010. Young's two children have a cousin-like relationship with the other children of No Doubt band members, as the children often spend time together during concerts.
