= History Revisited: The Remixes =

Remix album by Talk Talk
- Released: 25 March 1991
- Recorded: 1982–1990
- Genre: Synth-pop; electronic; dub
- Length: 57:24
- Label: Parlophone/EMI
- Producer: Tim Friese-Greene

Talk Talk chronology
Natural History (1990)	History Revisited: The Remixes (1991)	Laughing Stock (1991)

Singles from History Revisited
- 1. "Living in Another World '91" Released: 25 February 1991

History Revisited: The Remixes is a 1991 album comprising remixes of hit Talk Talk songs. It followed the successful greatest hits collection Natural History, released the year before. The band itself did not take part in the making of the album and condemned its release; consequently, they sued their former record label EMI for using Talk Talk material without permission.

== Background ==
Talk Talk formed in 1981 and released four albums with EMI. Around the time of Spirit of Eden (1988), the band attempted to extract themselves from their recording contract with EMI. 18 months of litigation followed. Ultimately, Talk Talk won the case on appeal, and in 1990 they left EMI and moved to Polydor. Soon after, EMI released the compilation Natural History, a retrospective of Talk Talk's career up until that point. The compilation was surprisingly successful: it spent 21 weeks on the UK Albums Chart, peaking at #3, and went on to sell over one million copies worldwide.

== Remixes ==
To promote Natural History, EMI reissued the singles "It's My Life", "Life's What You Make It" and "Such a Shame" in 1990, with "Living in Another World" reissued in 1991 and noted as "Taken from the forthcoming remixes album". New remixes for the singles' 12-inch and CD formats were commissioned and all four reissues peaked within the top 100 of the UK Singles Chart. The new remixes, prepared by relatively unknown musicians outside of the band, became the basis for History Revisited. They were collected together and four more tracks were added to complete the compilation: new remixes for past singles "Talk Talk", "Today", "Dum Dum Girl" and a remix of "Happiness is Easy", which Talk Talk members Lee Harris and Paul Webb had created in 1986.

The remixes collected on History Revisited modified the source material liberally. According to EMI publicity at the time, they are "Talk Talk through the dance keyhole, taking the diverse sounds of their eighties output and giving it a nineties groove." Keith Aspden, the band's manager, observed, "They haven't just remixed what is already there. They have practically replaced all the instruments with new poppy dance sounds from other people's records, even including an African chant." He commented, "It's a distortion—more like History Reinvented".

== Critical reception ==
Professional ratings
Review scores
Source	Rating
AllMusic	2/5 stars
Q	4/5 stars
Select	1/5 stars

History Revisited was released throughout the world in March 1991. It spent two weeks on the UK Albums Chart, peaking at #35. Barry Mcllheney of Q magazine called the album an "interesting example of how anyone with a good tune under their belts can be made instantly danceable with the application of the correct knobs at the appropriate moments." James Neiss of Record Collector thought otherwise, saying, "Talk Talk got most of their complex originals right first time around. The songs simply don't work with a different beat slung underneath." Writing for Select, Nick Griffiths thought the remixes ruined the band's original material. Chris Woodstra of AllMusic gave it a poor rating, saying, "A nice companion piece for fans, but probably the least essential of their catalog."

== Band response and lawsuit ==
Talk Talk leader Mark Hollis was very unhappy when he found out about History Revisited. He told Melody Maker:

I've never heard any of this stuff and I don't want to hear it . . . but to have people putting this stuff out under your name which is not you, y'know, I want no part of it. It's always been very important to me that I've got on with the people we've worked with. People's attitude has always been really important to me. So much of why someone would exist on one of our albums is what they are like as a person. So to find you've got people you've never given the time of day to going out as though it's you . . . it's disgusting.

Before it was released, Hollis sent letters requesting that the compilation be stopped, but EMI did not respond. In November 1991, Talk Talk sued EMI, delivering four writs against their former record label. The band claimed that material had been falsely attributed to them and that they were owed money from unpaid royalties. Talk Talk won the case in 1992, and EMI agreed to withdraw and destroy all remaining copies of the album. Manager Keith Aspden hoped that the case would set a precedent for future recording contracts.

Laughing Stock, released in 1991, ended up being Talk Talk's final studio album. EMI released several more Talk Talk compilations throughout the 1990s and 2000s, though History Revisited remains out of print.

== Track listing ==
1. "Living in Another World – '91" – 4:40
  - Remixed by Julian Mendelsohn
2. "Such a Shame" – 5:41
  - Remixed by Gary Miller
3. "Happiness is Easy (Dub)" – 7:02
  - Remixed by Paul Webb and Lee Harris
4. "Today" – 3:24
  - Remixed by Gary Miller
5. "Dum Dum Girl (Spice Remix)" – 4:59
  - Remixed by Justin Robertson
6. "Life's What You Make It" – 6:14
  - Remixed by BBG
7. "Talk Talk" – 5:22
  - Remixed by Gary Miller
8. "It's My Life (Tropical Rainforest Mix)" – 5:58
  - Remixed by Dominic Woosey and JJ Montana
9. "Living in Another World (Curious World Dub Mix)" – 7:48
  - Remixed by 4 to the Floor
10. "Life's What You Make It (The Fluke Remix)" – 6:16
  - Remixed by Fluke
