= Natural History: The Very Best of Talk Talk =

Natural History

Greatest hits album by Talk Talk
- Released: 29 May 1990
- Recorded: 1982–1988
- Genres: Synth-pop; new wave; post-rock; art rock
- Length: 71:47
- Label: Parlophone/EMI
- Producers: Colin Thurston; Tim Friese-Greene; Rhett Davies

Talk Talk chronology
| Spirit of Eden (1988) | Natural History (1990) | History Revisited: The Remixes (1991) |

Singles from Natural History
- 1. "It's My Life" Released: 7 May 1990; 2. "Life's What You Make It" Released: 20 August 1990; 3. "Such a Shame" Released: 19 November 1990

Professional ratings
Review scores
| Source | Rating |
|---|---|
| AllMusic | 4/5 stars |
| New Musical Express | 8/10 |
| Select | 4/5 |

Natural History: The Very Best of Talk Talk is a greatest hits album by Talk Talk released on 29 May 1990. It collects songs that the band released under EMI between 1982 and 1988.

== Reception ==
The compilation spent 21 weeks on the UK Albums Chart, peaking at #3, and went on to sell over one million copies worldwide. The North American version appended two live bonus tracks. A companion collection of the band's music videos was released in July 1990.

== Production and re-releases ==
EMI released the compilation without the band's supervision. Talk Talk leader Mark Hollis said, "A compilation album is not my idea of an album. I don't like compilation albums and I didn't like that one. It certainly wasn't the selection of tracks I would have liked even if there had to be one. But, at the end of the day, they had every right to do it so . . ." In light of Natural History's success, the remix album History Revisited was released in 1991. Talk Talk sued EMI for remixing their material without permission. Though the collection contains no new material, it does have the non-LP 1983 single, "My Foolish Friend", which had never appeared on a full-length release before. On 12 March 2007 the album was reissued with a bonus DVD of their music videos. Two bonus tracks were also included from the 1999 live release London 1986.

== Track listing ==
All tracks are written by Mark Hollis and Tim Friese-Greene, except where noted.

| No. | Title | Writer(s) | Original album | Length |
|---|---|---|---|---|
| 1. | "Today" | Simon Brenner; Lee Harris; Hollis; Paul Webb | The Party's Over | 3:30 |
| 2. | "Talk Talk" | Hollis; Ed Hollis | The Party's Over | 3:18 |
| 3. | "My Foolish Friend" | Brenner; Hollis | Non-album single | 3:21 |
| 4. | "Such a Shame" | Hollis | It's My Life | 5:43 |
| 5. | "Dum Dum Girl" | | It's My Life | 3:49 |
| 6. | "It's My Life" | | It's My Life | 3:55 |
| 7. | "Give It Up" | | The Colour of Spring | 5:19 |
| 8. | "Living in Another World" | | The Colour of Spring | 6:57 |
| 9. | "Life's What You Make It" | | The Colour of Spring | 4:29 |
| 10. | "Happiness Is Easy" | | The Colour of Spring | 6:33 |
| 11. | "I Believe in You" | | Spirit of Eden | 6:04 |
| 12. | "Desire" | | Spirit of Eden | 7:00 |

Bonus tracks on the US release
| No. | Title | Writer(s) | Length |
|---|---|---|---|
| 13. | "Life's What You Make It (Live @ the Hammersmith Odeon)" | | 4:40 |
| 14. | "Tomorrow's Started (Live @ the Hammersmith Odeon)" | Hollis | 7:45 |

== Certifications ==
| Region | Certification | Certified units/sales |
|---|---|---|
| Germany (BVMI) | Gold | 250,000^{^} |
| Netherlands (NVPI) | Gold | 50,000^{^} |
| United Kingdom (BPI) | Gold | 100,000^{^} |
^{^} Shipments figures based on certification alone.

== Credits ==
- James Marsh – cover art
