= Laughing Stock =

1991 album by Talk Talk

Studio album by Talk Talk
- Released: 16 September 1991
- Recorded: Early 1990 – 1991 (credited as September 1990 – April 1991)
- Studios: Wessex, London
- Genres: Post-rock; art rock; ambient
- Length: 43:29
- Labels: Verve, Polydor
- Producer: Tim Friese-Greene

Talk Talk chronology
History Revisited (1991)	Laughing Stock (1991)	Asides Besides (1998)

Singles from Laughing Stock
- 1. "After the Flood (Outtake)" Released: 7 October 1991; 2. "New Grass" Released: 28 October 1991; 3. "Ascension Day" Released: 25 November 1991

Laughing Stock is the fifth and final studio album by English band Talk Talk, released on 16 September 1991. Following their previous release Spirit of Eden (1988), bassist Paul Webb left the group, which reduced Talk Talk to the duo of singer/multi-instrumentalist Mark Hollis and drummer Lee Harris. Talk Talk then acrimoniously left EMI and signed to Polydor, who released the album on their newly revitalised jazz-based Verve Records label. Laughing Stock was recorded at London's Wessex Sound Studios from September 1990 to April 1991 with producer Tim Friese-Greene and engineer Phill Brown.

Like Spirit of Eden, the album featured improvised instrumentation from a large ensemble of musicians. The demanding sessions were marked by Hollis' perfectionist tendencies and desire to create a suitable recording atmosphere. Engineer Phill Brown stated that the album, like its predecessor, was "recorded by chance, accident, and hours of trying every possible overdub idea." The band split up following its release.

The album garnered significant critical praise, often cited as a watershed entry for the budding post-rock genre at the time of its release. Pitchfork retrospectively gave the album a perfect 10 out of 10 score and named it the eleventh best album of the 1990s, saying it "makes its own environment and becomes more than the sum of its sounds." In a 2007 list, Stylus Magazine named it the greatest post-rock album.

== Background ==
In 1986, Talk Talk, then a three-piece band consisting of leader and singer Mark Hollis alongside drummer Lee Harris and bassist Paul Webb, released their third album The Colour of Spring, which saw the band shift from their earlier, synthpop-oriented sound towards a more organic art pop sound, where musicians improvised with their instruments for many hours and Hollis and producer Tim Friese-Greene edited and arranged the performances to get the sound they wanted. A total of sixteen musicians appeared on the album. It became their most successful album, selling over two million copies and prompting a major world tour. Nonetheless, for their next album Spirit of Eden (1988), the band chose to work towards an even more unconventional and uncommercial direction. The album was compiled from a lengthy recording process at in Studio 1 at London's Wessex Studios between 1987 and 1988 where the band worked again with Friese-Greene and engineer Phill Brown. Once again working largely in darkness, the band recorded many hours of improvised performances which were heavily edited and re-arranged into the final album.

Spirit of Eden was not a commercial success and although it would be acclaimed in later retrospective reviews, it initially polarized music critics. Their record label EMI had doubts about whether it could have been successful many months in advance. They asked Hollis to re-record a song or replace material, but he refused to do so. By the time the masters were delivered later in the month, however, the label conceded that the album had been satisfactorily completed, and chose to extend the band's recording contract. The band, however, wanted out of the contract. "I knew by that time that EMI was not the company this band should be with," manager Keith Aspden told Mojo. "I was fearful that the money wouldn't be there to record another album." EMI and Talk Talk went to court to decide the issue. Centered around whether EMI had notified the band in time about the contract extension, because as part of the agreement, the label had to send a written notice within three months after the completion of the album, but the band said they had notified them too late, arguing that the three-month period began once recording had finished; EMI argued that the three-month period did not begin until they were satisfied with the recording. Justice Andrew Morritt ruled in favour of EMI, but his decision was overturned in the Court of Appeal of England and Wales. Talk Talk were released from the contract.

Nonetheless, in 1990, bassist Paul Webb left the band, officially reducing Talk Talk to the duo of Hollis and Harris. EMI also issued two compilations without the band's consent in 1990 and 1991; Natural History: The Very Best of Talk Talk – a best-of/greatest hits album, and History Revisited – a collection of new remixes of old material from the band. Hollis was vocal in his opposition to both releases. Before the latter was released, Hollis sent letters requesting that the compilation be stopped, but EMI did not respond. In November 1991, Talk Talk sued EMI, delivering four writs against their former record label. The band claimed that material had been falsely attributed to them and that they were owed money from unpaid royalties. Talk Talk won the case in 1992, and EMI agreed to withdraw and destroy all remaining copies of the album. Manager Keith Aspden hoped that the case would set a precedent for future recording contracts.

As the band's legal battle with EMI concerning their contract had freed them from the label, the band began searching for other record labels, and eventually, their manager Keith Aspden signed them to Verve Records, the jazz offshoot label of Polydor Records. Hollis was pleased that they signed Talk Talk because the Mothers of Invention were once on Verve. The band set to recording their new album soon after the contract was signed. Again hiring an array of guest musicians, producer/multi-instrumentalist Tim Friese-Greene and engineer Phill Brown, work began on Laughing Stock in 1990.

== Recording ==
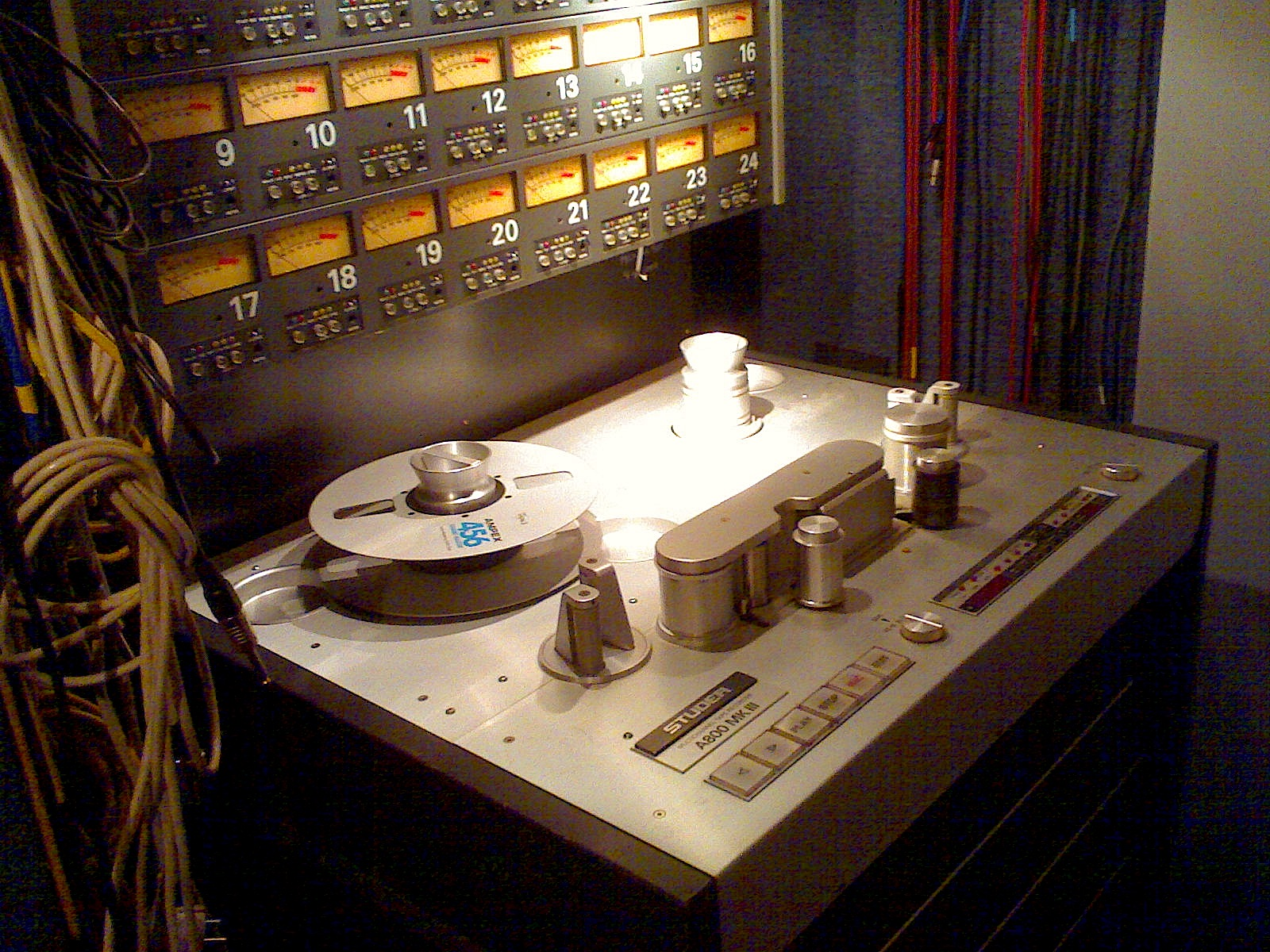
Brown and the band worked with a Studer A800 24-track machine with Dolby SR formats.

With Verve Records guaranteeing full funding for Laughing Stock and offering not to interfere during recording, the band took full advantage of the scenario and "locked themselves away for the duration of recording." As with the band's previous album, Laughing Stock was produced by Tim Friese-Greene and recorded at the North London recording studio Wessex Sound Studios with engineer Phill Brown, and around fifty guest musicians, although a total of only eighteen guest musicians feature on the final album. Working in an environment influenced by that of Traffic's recording sessions from 1967 that Brown worked on, Hollis' vision with Laughing Stock was to "collect a group of like-minded musicians together" in the studio where he could then record the "perspective of instruments in physical distance rather than off the board," after which "each player gets to improvise around a basic theme as he or she feels it." The process continued over a long period of time, and ultimately the album took a year to record, although its liner notes state it was recorded from September 1990 to April 1991. The record was "only complete" when Hollis felt each guest musician had "expressed their character and refined their contribution to the purest, most truthful essence."

Hollis' discipline during the recording is well-noted; Jess Harvell of Pitchfork noted that "the recording process has long been described as one of the most arduous and prone to control freakitude ever." Wyndham Wallace of The Quietus said that "what went on in that studio strengthens the belief that Hollis was on a crusade to push boundaries and perfect his art on an even grander scale than Spirit of Eden. Furnished with the opportunity to fulfil his most extreme creative instincts." Often working in darkness, "there was an effort to create a vibe in the studio sympathetic with the feel of the album," as Aspden recalled, and the band removed clocks from the walls, covered up the windows, "set up oil projections on the walls and ceiling, and used no other light apart from a strobe," to create a suitable atmosphere for recording.

The guest musicians were brought in "to improvise on sections without hearing the full track. With just a basic chord structure at most, they were encouraged to try out anything their hearts encouraged them to, and then, thanks to the emerging digital technology, any results felt appropriate were employed, sometimes in places for which they had never originally been envisioned." Most of the music recorded never made the final album, with Brown commenting "it takes a strong discipline to erase 80% of the music you record. Few have the discipline to get rid of 'stuff'." As with previous albums, Hollis alone chose what parts of the recordings to use and in what context. Compared to Spirit of Eden, Laughing Stock was recorded with "a more conventional '80's set up." Brown and the band worked with a Studer A800 24-track recorder with Dolby SR noise reduction, which, to make editing simpler, was run at 30 inches per second.

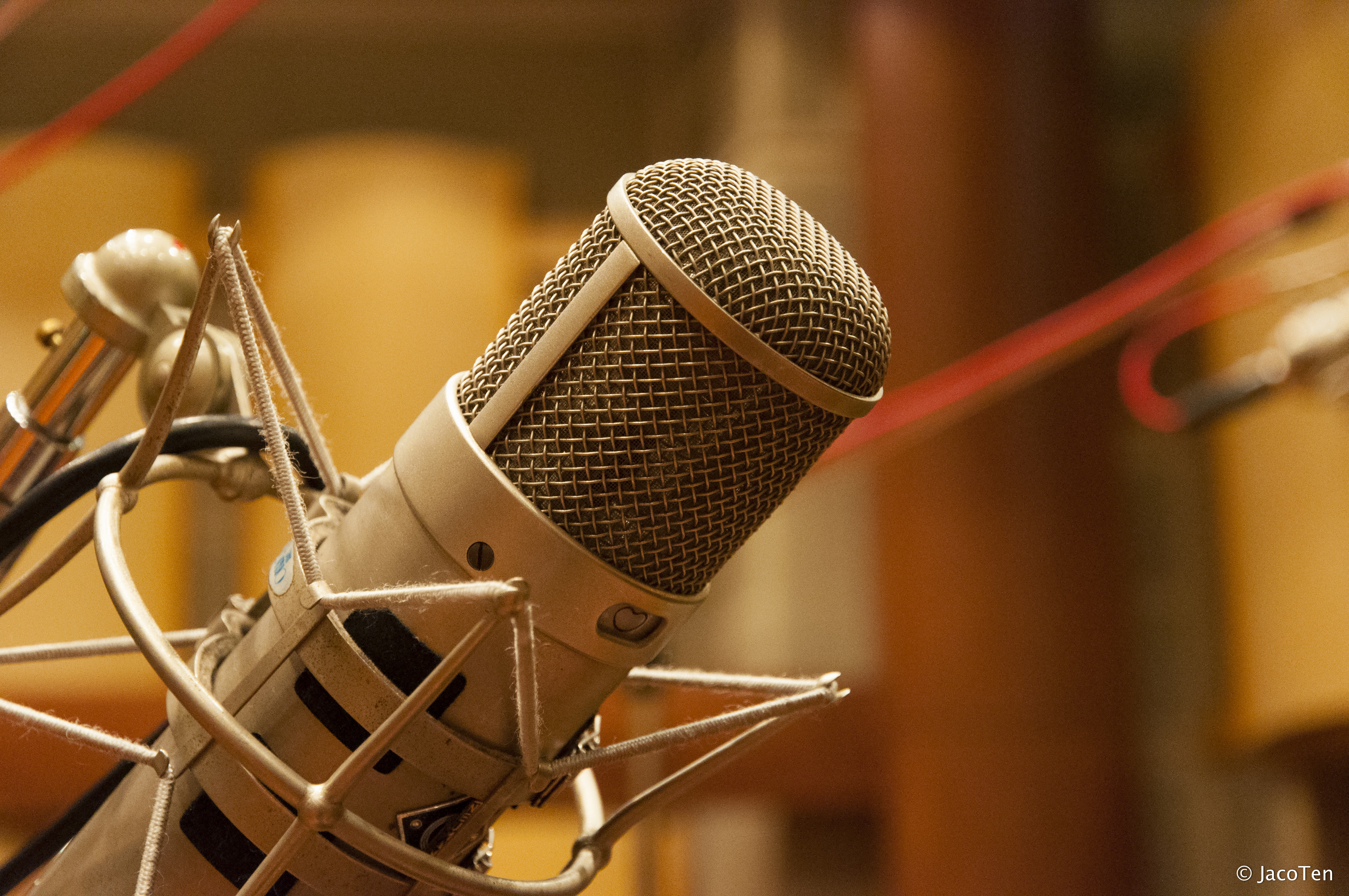
A Neumann U47 Tube microphone, the kind used to record many of the album's components

Harris' drums were firstly set up against the far wall of the studio's main recording room, Wessex Studio 1, and were microphoned in "the usual rock arrangement", using "about ten microphones all close to the kit – bass drum, snare, hi-hat, tom-toms, overheads, ambient etc." Following this, Brown and Hollis rented the Telefunken U47, a large-diaphragm condenser valve microphone manufactured by Georg Neumann GmbH during the years 1949–1965. They chose it from an offering of several valve mics, which besides the U47 included a Neumann U48, M49 and "Tube", alongside "the old Wessex Collection" which included three AKG C12As. They carefully listened to each before settling on the U47. However, they placed it "30 feet away from the kit near the control-room window," which became an issue as the physical distance triggered a delay of 26-32 milliseconds.

Having by that point created backing tracks, they "made up Mitsubishi Digital masters" as they had done with Spirit of Eden, although this time they operated five analogue slave tapes, which gave them access "to over 120 tracks for recording ideas." From this point, they continued to overdub further textures and instruments, including cellos, pianos, harmoniums, guitars, double bass, violas, harmonica, percussion, Melodica, Hammond organ, Variophon, drums, and unusually, a water heater and kettle, as well as techniques such as "sampling, looping, off-setting, and the odd backwards F/X." Differing, distant miking techniques were employed for these instruments, with mics being placed "six feet from acoustic instruments, and about twelve feet from amplifiers." With the album now completed, they used only "an old spring echo, an EMT echo plate, and a DDL" to mix the album.

== Music ==
On Laughing Stock, the band’s final record, they whiplash between extremes. Sometimes the sound is serene and gorgeous, like the gentle, brush-stroked “New Grass”; and sometimes it’s harsher, as in “Ascension Day,” a thrashing epic that presages the decade’s most explosive post-rock bands. The image that always comes to mind while listening is a sanctuary, but Talk Talk were just as quick to knock down the walls. In the last second of “Ascension Day,” the tape cuts mid-performance, ending the song abruptly and inorganically, suggesting the whole thing is an illusion. The magic was always ours to create.

— Sam Sodomsky of Pitchfork (September 28, 2022)

Laughing Stock consists of six tracks; Steve Sutherland said the album is "divided into six parts although it's really one long piece spanning an evolution of moods." Ian Cranna of Q said the album was "even more withdrawn and personal than before." Comparing the album to Spirit of Eden, Jess Harvell of Pitchfork says "the song structures are even stranger, built up from the tiniest musical gestures, clashing in mood from track to track, frequently more improvised-sounding than ever. The goal, assembling a coherent album from all this stuff, probably seemed quixotic to many of the contributors as it was being made." In a 1991 interview with Melody Maker, Mark Hollis said "the last thing I would ever want to do is intellectualise music because that's never been what it's about for me. Nothing has changed from the ethic of the last album and I would never want that to change because I can't see any way of improving upon that process. As before, silence is the most important thing you have, one note is better than two, spirit is everything, and technique, although it has a degree of importance, is always secondary."

"It's never a thing with any of these albums of knowing what they're going to sound like. It's more like knowing the kind of feel you want. The one kind of starting point we had this time was just this thing of everyone working in their own little time zone. Really, it's just going back to one of a couple of things – either the jazz ethic or y'know, an album like Tago Mago by Can, where the drummer locked-in and off he went and people reacted at certain points along the way. It's arranged spontaneity – that's exactly what it is."

— Mark Hollis discussing the production.

Hollis cited Can's Tago Mago, John Coltrane's "In a Sentimental Mood" – where "it sounds like the bloke's setting his kit up" – and Bob Dylan's New Morning as influences, "because there, if you're talking about sounds being honest, I don't think you can get much more honest than that. It just sounds like the band's in the front room with you." In a radio interview with Richard Skinner at the time of the album's release, Hollis commented that "I think silence is an extremely important thing. It isn't something that should be abused. And that's my biggest worry because of the whole way that communications have developed, that there is a tendency just to allow this background noise all the time rather than thinking about what is important. The silence is above everything, and I would rather hear one note than I would two, and I would rather hear silence than I would one note," and according to Wyndham Wallace, "this helps explain the fifteen seconds of amplifier hiss that open the record's first track, 'Myrrhman', the huge amounts of space left in final track 'Runeii', and the overall sonic concept perfected by Friese-Greene and Brown, who declares third track 'After the Flood' to be "probably the best engineering for me in the past forty years." Drums were miked far from the kit, sounds were allowed to echo through the studio space, mistakes were an integral part of the performance, and the album's dynamics are entirely genuine, the live feel of a jazz record."

"New Grass" was described as "Talk Talk as a purely placid and lovely proposition, electric organ and lilting guitar endlessly circling around Harris' heartbeat-steady drumming." "Ascension Day", in contrast, is considered the band's "most chaotic and vicious song," described by Harvell as "like a small jazz combo being elbowed aside by a noise rock band, with a climactic barrage of drumming that falls on your ears like an avalanche before the audible tape-splice cuts it dead." In the song, Hollis sings about judgment day and "its inevitable coming, saying farewell to us all."

“Taphead", a "masterfully subtle piece of music", begins with a simple guitar melody and Hollis' "wavering, unsure vocals," when keyboards unexpectedly fade in "and then the darkest, warmest trumpet sounds, one after the other, building beautiful harmony, with tension and release techniques apparent throughout the feature." Tyler Fisher, describing it for Sputnikmusic continued that "with this, Talk Talk creates a climax unlike any heard before or after. Following a more frenetic trumpet feature, light drums, bass, and piano enter, setting the slightest groove to allow for a screaming trumpet note and Hollis' vocals. Another climax that lasted less than a second. The control that the ensemble shows in 'Taphead' is unparalleled."

== Release ==
When the band delivered Laughing Stock to Verve, Polydor were purported "gutted", wondering how they would be able to sell such an uncommercial record. Sutherland recalled that "the first time I heard the record was at a dinner given for retailers by the record company at The New Serpentine Gallery. It was an embarrassingly desperate attempt over cocktails to convince store owners that they should stock a record which, the company was trying to infer, stood for quality over likely quantity of sales. Nobody knew where to look as Hollis' muted blues confessional purposely disintegrated into shivering feedback. A similar farce was, apparently, held in a Paris planetarium. Hollis attended both playbacks and survived. He says the Paris one wasn't too bad because, when the lights went out, it was close to the perfect way to listen to his music – with your eyes closed, watching your own mind movies. He didn't stick around in London, though – he had no desire to see people's reactions. He says he's proud of the record and, seeing as it wasn't made for other people, their opinions don't bother him."

Hollis denied that there was any problem with Polydor, saying "the whole structure of the deal we have with this record company is understanding how we work. I suppose because it's on Verve some people will think we've been stuck under 'Jazz' but what on earth does jazz mean? It's such a vague term, isn't it? Without any question there are certain areas of jazz that are extremely important to me. Ornette Coleman is an example. But jazz as a term is as widely used and abused as soul – it no longer means what it should mean. Jazz has almost been bastardised to such an extent that, if you've got a saxophone on a record, it's jazz, which is a terrifying idea. It's like, where would you ever place Can? To me Tago Mago is an extremely important album that has elements of jazz in it, but I would never call it jazz. Basically, the deal is that I promise to give them the best album I can. I think they have options across four albums which, at the pace we work, is the next 12 years. What more can you say?"

Verve Records released the album on 16 September 1991. No official singles or music videos were released to promote the album. Nonetheless, a limited edition box set entitled After the Flood / New Grass / Ascension Day was released in France, containing the aforementioned three songs from the album, with the former edited down as an "outtake", and two unreleased B-sides ("Stump", "5:09"). In the United States, a recording of an interview with Mark Hollis entitled Mark Hollis Talks About Laughing Stock was distributed on cassette. Despite the lack of traditional promotion, the album reached number 26 on the UK Albums Chart, and stayed on the chart for two weeks.

Unlike Talk Talk's other albums, the album has never been remastered for CD, but on 11 October 2011, Ba Da Bing Records released a remastered version of Laughing Stock on vinyl, the first vinyl release of the album in the United States. Pitchfork commented that the remastering on this re-release sounds "amazing, as good as the album's ever sounded, in any format. Which is crucial, because on some level Talk Talk's later albums are all about sound. How startling, isolated moments of sound, or a formless wash of sound, can wring emotions out of listeners as powerfully as any conventional melody."

== Artwork ==
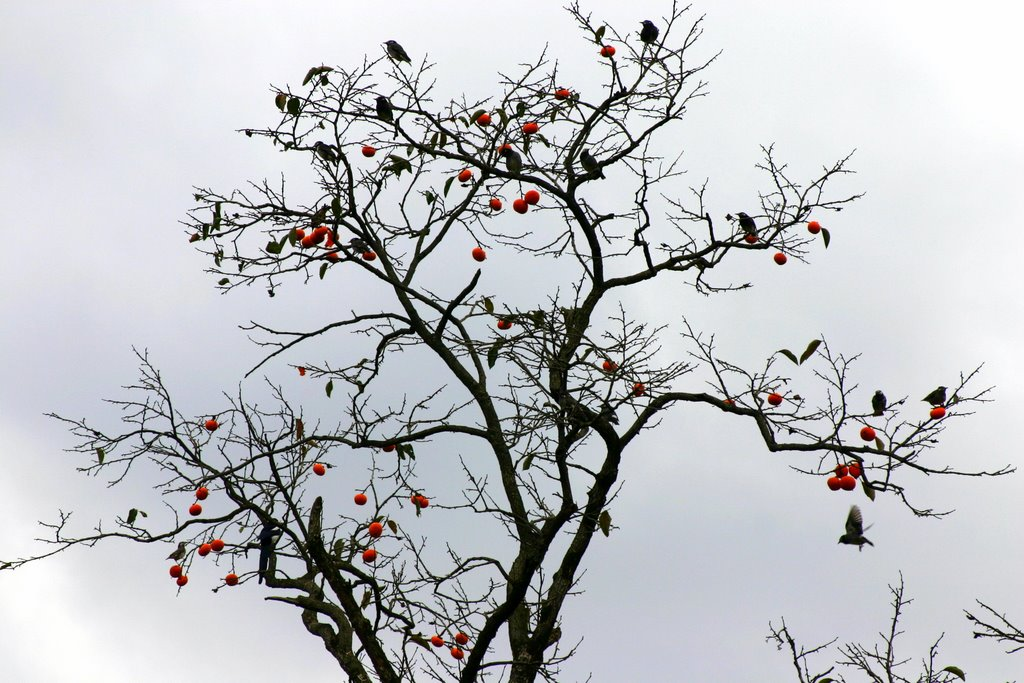
Mark Hollis requested that a tree of birds feature in the album cover to connect the album to Spirit of Eden.

The cover art was designed by English visual artist James Marsh, responsible for most of Talk Talk's artwork. Marsh initially painted a cover depicting a group of threatened birds forming the shape of a larger bird in flight over a desolate landscape. However, Hollis later felt the artwork should feature a tree, to create a visual connection to Spirit of Eden. The final cover featured the same birds in a spherical tree forming the shapes of the Earth's continents. Later on, the first cover was used as the artwork for Talk Talk's three-single box set After the Flood. As with previous albums, the album's liner notes feature Hollis' handwritten lyrics for each of the songs. Russel Uttley of Peacock Design is credited with the layout design of the sleeve.

== Critical reception ==
Professional ratings
Review scores
Source	Rating
AllMusic	5/5 stars
Muzik	4/5 stars
NME	4/10 (1991); 5/10 (2000)
Pitchfork	10/10
Q	4/5 stars
The Rolling Stone Album Guide	2/5 stars
Select	4/5
The Times	8/10
Uncut	10/10
Vox	9/10

Upon release, Laughing Stock received mixed reviews from music critics. Jim Irvin was effusive in Melody Maker, finding that with Laughing Stock, Talk Talk had produced "three masterpieces in a row" and become "certainly the most individual, possibly the most important group we have." Writing for Vox, Betty Page lauded it as one of 1991's "most challenging records". Select's Nick Griffiths called the album "perverse genius" and "an exercise in self-indulgence and nothing more. If you refuse to enter their playground for the world-weary then that's fine by them." Ian Cranna of Q said that while "the melancholy mood, a rare thoughtfulness and the sense of sharing something deeply personal, together with the haunting, emotional quality of the understated music, put Talk Talk heavily at odds with the commercial charts ... the same qualities will ensure that even though Laughing Stock may lose Hollis some of his newly found friends, it will be valued long after such superficial quick thrills are forgotten." In NME, however, David Quantick wrote that the album "is unutterably pretentious and looks over its shoulder hoping that someone will remark on its 'moody brilliance' or some such. It's horrible." At the end of 1991, Laughing Stock was listed by Melody Maker as the year's 12th best album, while Oor ranked it 20th best; it also placed at number 26 on Eye Weekly's year-end critics' poll.

Retrospectively, Laughing Stock has gone on to receive widespread acclaim. "A work of staggering complexity and immense beauty," wrote AllMusic critic Jason Ankeny, "Laughing Stock remains an under-recognized masterpiece, and its echoes can be heard throughout much of the finest experimental music issued in its wake." Reviewing the album for The Times, Victoria Segal found that in its "instrumental richness and exploratory dynamics", it "chimes unexpectedly with many recent developments in today's rock landscape", while also noting an "emotional heat" which "stops Laughing Stock from being mere academic indulgence." Jess Harvell of Pitchfork commented that "sound can become all the more powerful when surrounded by silence, great gulfs of which are all over the later Talk Talk albums, especially Laughing Stock". Sputnikmusic's Tyler Fisher said, "The world needs to hear this album, even if you haven't liked post rock before, because I guarantee that this is not the type of music you think of when you think post rock. Unfortunately, it should be." In The Irish Times, Donal Dineen wrote that the album "shows what magic can happen if bands have the talent and daring to push boundaries".

== Legacy ==
"Laughing Stock seems to gain more acclaim with each passing year. That may be the result of all the bands – electroacoustic, free folk, post-rock or what have you – who are struggling to reach what Talk Talk achieved: a record that makes its own environment and becomes more than the sum of its sounds."

— Pitchfork discussing Laughing Stock in 2003.

The album has appeared in multiple "best albums" lists. In 2003, Pitchfork listed Laughing Stock as 11th best album of the 1990s. The same year, Mojo placed the album on their list of the "Top 50 Eccentric Albums". In 1999, Ned Raggett included the album at number 4 in his list of "The Top 136 or So Albums of the Nineties". In 2014, Rockdelux ranked the album at 138 on their list of "The 300 Best Albums of 1984–2014". In 2004, the German version of Rolling Stone ranked the album at number 108 in their list of "The 500 Greatest Albums of All Time".

Laughing Stock is considered, along with Spirit of Eden and Slint's Spiderland, to have been the primary catalyst of the post-rock genre. AllMusic said that "the musical foundation for post-rock crystallized in 1991, with the release of two very different landmarks: Talk Talk's Laughing Stock and Slint's Spiderland." The term "post-rock" itself was not coined until Simon Reynolds used it in his Melody Maker review of Hex (1994) by Bark Psychosis, which featured Talk Talk-inspired ambient experiments. Laughing Stock has also influenced Elbow and Bon Iver, and in 2011, Jess Harvell of Pitchfork said "many indie rock bands and experimental composers have genuflected toward it over the last 20 years."

Norwegian singer-songwriter Jenny Hval said in 2011 that Laughing Stock "is an incredibly intuitive and bare recording – some songs feel like vapour trails. To me, every sound on the album is about death, like the songs are about to die, like a band of Beckett characters. But at the same time the album is so emotional. 'After the Flood' is like crying. After 22 July [the day of the 2011 Norway attacks], Laughing Stock was one of two records I wanted to listen to." Scottish singer King Creosote said "I think of the final two albums by Talk Talk as siblings very close in age. If Spirit of Eden is the older, pretty and sophisticated big sister who got all the A grades, then Laughing Stock is the wayward, grubby wee brother who got kicked out of school for skiving." Tom Fleming of Wild Beasts, whose bands have been often compared to Talk Talk, praised the album and commented that it is a "kind of a dead end. It's like minimal techno. It's like, how much more minimal can you be?"

After engineering Laughing Stock, Phill Brown said "there was divorce, breakdown. It was intense. I have never worked on more focussed sessions though. And no – I wouldn't work in the dark again. It was difficult getting back to 'normal' sessions." However, compared to prior Talk Talk albums, he goes on to note that "Laughing Stock is a different beast. I am very proud of the album, it's probably one of my best projects, but I find it dark and claustrophobic." Laughing Stock was the last release in the band's career, as Talk Talk silently disbanded in 1992, as Hollis wished to focus on his family. Paul Webb rejoined Lee Harris, and the two went on to form the band .O.rang, who recorded several albums in the 1990s, while Tim Friese-Greene started recording under the name Heligoland. Mark Hollis effectively left the music industry, but in 1998 released his unexpected self-titled solo début Mark Hollis, which was much in keeping with the post-rock sound of Spirit of Eden and Laughing Stock, finding inspiration not in the popular music of the day, but rather in 20th-century classical music and jazz from the late fifties and sixties. He officially retired from the music industry shortly afterwards.

== Track listing ==
All tracks are written by Mark Hollis and Tim Friese-Greene.

Side one
No.	Title	Length
1.	"Myrrhman"	5:33
2.	"Ascension Day"	6:00
3.	"After the Flood"	9:39
Total length:		21:12

Side two
No.	Title	Length
1.	"Taphead"	7:39
2.	"New Grass"	9:40
3.	"Runeii"	4:58
Total length:		22:17 43:29

Note:

- Most pressings of this album on CD have tracks "After the Flood" and "Taphead" overlapping for roughly 20 seconds, resulting in respective run times of 9:26 and 7:01.

== Personnel ==
Talk Talk

- Mark Hollis – vocals, guitar, piano, organ, melodica, Variophon
- Lee Harris – drums, percussion

Other musicians

- Tim Friese-Greene – producer, piano, organ, harmonium
- Mark Feltham – harmonica
- Martin Ditcham – percussion
- Levine Andrade, Stephen Tees, George Robertson, Gavyn Wright, Jack Glickman, Garfield Jackson, Wilfred Gibson – viola
- Simon Edwards, Ernest Mothle – acoustic bass
- Roger Smith, Paul Kegg – cello
- Henry Lowther – trumpet, flugelhorn
- Dave White – contrabass clarinet

Technical personnel

- Phill Brown – engineer
- James Marsh – cover illustration

== Charts ==
Chart (1991)	Peak position
Dutch Albums (Album Top 100)	60
German Albums (Offizielle Top 100)	65
UK Albums (Official Charts)	26
Chart (2019)	Peak position
Scottish Albums (Official Charts)	95
