= Spirit of Eden =

Studio album by Talk Talk
- Released: 12 September 1988
- Recorded: 11 May 1987 – 11 March 1988
- Studios: Wessex Sound, London
- Genres: Post-rock; art rock; experimental rock; ambient; new wave
- Length: 41:30
- Label: Parlophone (EMI)
- Producer: Tim Friese-Greene

Talk Talk chronology
| The Colour of Spring (1986) | Spirit of Eden (1988) | Natural History (1990) |

Singles from Spirit of Eden
- 1. "I Believe in You" Released: 19 September 1988

Spirit of Eden is the fourth studio album by English band Talk Talk, released by Parlophone Records on 12 September 1988. It was compiled from a lengthy recording process at London's Wessex Studios between 1987 and 1988, with songs written by singer Mark Hollis and producer Tim Friese-Greene. Often working in darkness, the band recorded many hours of improvised performances that drew on elements of jazz, ambient, classical music, blues, and dub. These long-form recordings were then heavily edited and re-arranged into an album in mostly digital format. The results were a radical departure from Talk Talk's earlier synth-pop recordings, and would later be credited with pioneering the post-rock genre.

Compared to the success of 1986's The Colour of Spring, Spirit of Eden was a commercial disappointment. Despite its mixed reception, the album's stature grew more favourable in subsequent years, with contemporary critics describing Spirit of Eden as an underrated masterpiece. In 2013, NME ranked Spirit of Eden at number 95 in its list of the "500 Greatest Albums of All Time".

== Background ==
Talk Talk, led by singer Mark Hollis, formed in England in the early 1980s. From the start, Hollis cited jazz and classical artists like Miles Davis, John Coltrane, Darius Milhaud, Béla Bartók and Claude Debussy as major influences, but the first two Talk Talk albums, The Party's Over (1982) and It's My Life (1984), did not readily reflect such influences; critics compared the band to contemporary new wave groups, especially Duran Duran. Hollis partly attributed the shortcomings of their early music to a financial need to use synthesizers in place of acoustic instruments.

Although critics did not favour the band's early output, the first two albums were commercially successful in Europe. This gave Talk Talk the money needed to hire additional musicians to play on their next album, The Colour of Spring (1986). The band no longer had to rely on synthesizers. Instead, musicians improvised with their instruments for many hours, then Hollis and producer Tim Friese-Greene edited and arranged the performances to get the sound they wanted. A total of sixteen musicians appeared on the album around the core of Hollis and Friese-Greene. The Colour of Spring became Talk Talk's most successful album, selling over two million copies and prompting a major world tour. At the same time, minimalist songs like "April 5th," "Chameleon Day," and the B-side "It's Getting Late in the Evening" pointed towards the band's next direction.

== Music ==
=== Recording ===
It was very, very psychedelic. We had candles and oil wheels, strobes going, sometimes just total darkness in the studio. You'd get totally disorientated, no daylight, no time frame.

— Phill Brown, engineer

Following the commercial success of The Colour of Spring, EMI gave Talk Talk an open budget for the recording of their next album, Spirit of Eden. Talk Talk were given complete control over the recording process; their manager and EMI executives were barred from studio sessions. Recording for Spirit of Eden began on 11 May 1987 at Wessex Studios, London and took ten months to complete; basic tracks were laid down over May–July 1987, before overdubs began on 19 October and continued for the remainder of the sessions.

The sessions took place in a blacked-out studio, with an oil projector and strobe lighting. Engineer Phill Brown said that the album, along with its successor, was "recorded by chance, accident, and hours of trying every possible overdub idea." According to Brown, "twelve hours a day in the dark listening to the same six songs for eight months became pretty intense. There was very little communication with musicians who came in to play. They were led to a studio in darkness and a track would be played down the headphones."

=== Style ===
Writing for The Guardian, Graeme Thomson described Spirit of Eden as "six improvised pieces full of space and unhurried rhythm," which blend together "pastoral jazz, contemporary classical, folk, prog rock and loose blues into a single, doggedly uncommercial musical tapestry" which would be labeled "post-rock." Simon Harper of the Birmingham Post observed the album's "combination of jazz, classical, rock and the spacey echoes of dub, using silence almost as an instrument in its own right." Although the album is noted for its tranquil soundscapes, Graham Sutton of Bark Psychosis notes "Noise is important. I could never understand people I knew who liked Talk Talk and saw it as something 'nice to chill out to' when I loved the overwhelming intensity and the dynamics."

Hollis wrote the album's lyrics late in the process; engineer Phill Brown recalled that no finished words existed until some seven or eight months into the sessions, and the vocals were among the last elements committed to tape in early 1988. The words were written at the Old Rectory in the Suffolk village of Stanningfield, to which Hollis and his wife had recently moved from London, and where the couple's first child was born during the making of the record; Thomson links the album's pastoral imagery to these new rural surroundings.

Mark Hollis' lyrics reflect his religious and spiritual outlook. Though he acknowledges that his lyrics are religious, he says they are not based on a specific creed, preferring to think of them as "humanitarian." "I Believe in You" has been described as an "anti-heroin song." When asked whether the lyrics are based on personal experience, Hollis replied, "No, not at all. But, you know, I met people who got totally fucked up on it. Within rock music there's so much fucking glorification of it, and it is a wicked, horrible thing."

== Contract dispute with EMI ==
By 11 March 1988, the band had finished recording Spirit of Eden and had sent a cassette of the album to EMI. After listening to the cassette, EMI representatives doubted that it could be commercially successful. They asked Hollis to re-record a song or replace material, but he refused to do so. By the time the masters were delivered later in the month, however, the label conceded that the album had been satisfactorily completed.

Despite their reservations towards Spirit of Eden, EMI chose to exercise their option to extend the recording contract. The band, however, wanted out of the contract. "I knew by that time that EMI was not the company this band should be with," manager Keith Aspden told Mojo. "I was fearful that the money wouldn't be there to record another album." EMI and Talk Talk went to court to decide the issue.

The case centred on whether EMI had notified the band in time about the contract extension. As part of the agreement, EMI had to send a written notice within three months after the completion of Spirit of Eden. The band said that EMI had sent the notice too late, arguing that the three-month period began once recording had finished; EMI argued that the three-month period did not begin until they were satisfied with the recording, on the basis that the definition of an "album" in the contract provided that the album had to be "commercially satisfactory". The band disputed this, particularly on the basis that there were no changes made to the album in the space between its recording and eventual release. Justice Andrew Morritt ruled in favour of EMI, but his decision was overturned in the Court of Appeal. Talk Talk were released from the contract and later signed to Polydor to release their next album, Laughing Stock.

== Marketing and release ==
Spirit of Eden's moody, experimental nature made it a challenge to promote; one critic said it "is the kind of record which encourages marketing men to commit suicide." Tony Wadsworth, Parlophone's marketing director at the time, told Q: "Talk Talk are not your ordinary combo and require sympathetic marketing. They're not so much difficult as not obvious. You've just got to find as many ways as possible to expose the music." Evaluating revered albums of the eighties in a 2004 article for The Guardian, John Robinson calls Spirit of Eden, like David Sylvian's Brilliant Trees, "triumphant, [but] completely unmarketable."

Although the band did not originally plan to release a single, EMI issued a radio edit of "I Believe in You" in September 1988 (the previously unreleased "John Cope" was included as the B-side). The single failed to breach the UK singles chart Top 75. Around August, Tim Pope directed a music video for "I Believe in You", featuring Hollis sitting with his guitar, singing the lyrics. "That was a massive mistake," said Hollis. "I thought just by sitting there and listening and really thinking about what it was about, I could get that in my eyes. But you cannot do it. It just feels stupid."

The band did not tour in support of the album. Hollis explained, "There is no way that I could ever play again a lot of the stuff I played on this album because I just wouldn't know how to. So, to play it live, to take a part that was done in spontaneity, to write it down and then get someone to play it, would lose the whole point, lose the whole purity of what it was in the first place." The band would never tour again.

Spirit of Eden was released worldwide in 1988. It did not enjoy nearly as much commercial success as The Colour of Spring. The album spent five weeks on the UK Albums Chart, peaking at number 19. The album cover depicts a tree festooned with seashells, snails, birds, and insects. It was illustrated by James Marsh, who did Talk Talk's artwork throughout their recording career. The booklet provides reproductions of Hollis' handwritten lyrics. The album was digitally remastered by Phil Brown and Denis Blackham in 1997.

== Critical reception ==
Professional ratings
Review scores
| Source | Rating |
|---|---|
| AllMusic | 5/5 stars |
| Mojo | 5/5 stars |
| NME | 7/10 |
| Pitchfork | 10/10 |
| Q | 4/5 stars |
| Record Collector | 5/5 stars |
| Record Mirror | 4/5 |
| The Rolling Stone Album Guide | 1/5 stars |
| Sounds | 4.5/5 stars |
| Uncut | 10/10 |

Spirit of Eden has been both acclaimed and panned by numerous music critics. Among contemporary reviews of Spirit of Eden, Record Mirror's Betty Page commented that Talk Talk had become "a law unto themselves, unconstrained by narrow ideas of 'what will sell'", while Q's Mark Cooper likened the album to "the pastoral epics of the early 70s" and noted "a range, ambition and self-sufficiency that enables Hollis and co to step out of time and into their own." "No hit singles then", the latter wrote, "but a brave record that is not afraid to follow its own muse and damn the consequences." In Sounds, Roy Wilkinson said that Talk Talk had "evolved into contemplative muso-techs", and while finding their lyrics occasionally awkward and the album's second half not at the level of the first's "magnificence", he deemed Spirit of Eden as a whole "uncommonly beautiful." Simon Williams began his review for NME with a joking dismissal of the album as an exercise in "conceptualism", before going on to describe the band as "resolute and determined" in their flouting of "commercial rules with fascinating disregard for understanding or acceptance."

In the 1992 Rolling Stone Album Guide, J. D. Considine rated Spirit of Eden one star out of five: "Instead of getting better or worse, this band simply grew more pretentious with each passing year ... by Spirit of Eden, Mark Hollis's Pete Townshend-on-Dramamine vocals have been pushed aside by the band's pointless noodling." Marcus Berkmann of The Spectator in a 2001 retrospective felt that the album was "almost wilfully obscure", with a musical style close to free-form jazz that was too far removed from The Colour of Spring for fans to enjoy.

Spirit of Eden has received more unanimous acclaim in the decades following its release. AllMusic reviewer Jason Ankeny considered the album, in its eschewing of "electronics for live, organic sounds" and of "structure in favor of mood and atmosphere", an "unprecedented breakthrough". Mojo's Danny Eccleston wrote in 2012 that "there will never be another album like it, since the demise of the profligate old-school record industry means that no one will ever spend so much money making anything so left-field again." In a 2019 review, Jeremy D. Larson of Pitchfork lauded the record as a masterful achievement in contemporary music, stating that "Spirit of Eden was the great inhale of religious feeling, one rock and pop music had been expelling for years and years. The thrill and stasis of a held breath carry the album from beginning to end."

== Legacy ==
Some music critics consider Spirit of Eden and its 1991 follow-up Laughing Stock influential to the post-rock genre, which developed in Britain and North America in the 1990s. In a review of Bark Psychosis' album Hex, where the term "post-rock" was coined, Simon Reynolds opined that Hex aspires to the "baroque grandeur" of Spirit of Eden. Andy Whitman of Paste magazine argued that Spirit of Eden represents the beginning of post-rock: "The telltale marks of the genre—textured guitars, glacial tempos, an emphasis on dynamics, electronica, ambience and minimalism—were all in place, and paved the way for bands like Sigur Rós, Mogwai, Godspeed You! Black Emperor, Low and latter-period Radiohead." In the Birmingham Post, Simon Harper held that "there can be little argument that Tortoise and their Chicago-based compatriots would hardly sound the same were it not for the staggering achievements of Hollis and Tim Friese-Greene". Numerous bands and artists, including Graham Coxon, Doves, Elbow, Bedhead, and Do Make Say Think, have praised Spirit of Eden or have cited it as an influence.

In 2008 Alan McGee wrote: "Spirit of Eden has not dated; it's remarkable how contemporary it sounds, anticipating post-rock, The Verve and Radiohead. It's the sound of an artist being given the keys to the kingdom and returning with art."

Mark Lager, writing about the album on its 30th anniversary in September 2018 for PopMatters, similarly stated that Spirit of Eden "influenced and inspired the three most experimental and innovative albums of the 1990s: Lazer Guided Melodies (Spiritualized), A Storm in Heaven (The Verve), and Hex (Bark Psychosis). All three albums followed its patterns of dynamic intensity, free jazz improvisations, and spaces of silence."

Spirit of Eden was voted number 419 in the 2000 edition of Colin Larkin's All Time Top 1000 Albums. In 2006, Q placed Spirit of Eden at number 31 in its list of the "40 Best Albums of the '80s" and in 2013, NME ranked the record at number 95 in its list of the "500 Greatest Albums of All Time".

== Track listing ==
All tracks are written by Mark Hollis and Tim Friese-Greene.

Side one
| No. | Title | Length |
|---|---|---|
| 1. | "The Rainbow" | 9:05 |
| 2. | "Eden" | 6:37 |
| 3. | "Desire" | 6:57 |
| Total length: | | 22:39 |

Side two
| No. | Title | Length |
|---|---|---|
| 1. | "Inheritance" | 5:16 |
| 2. | "I Believe in You" | 6:11 |
| 3. | "Wealth" | 6:35 |
| Total length: | | 18:02 |

Notes:

- Original CD pressings and all vinyl pressings index "The Rainbow", "Eden" and "Desire" into one track. CD pressings add roughly 32 seconds of silence at the end of the suite, making it 23:11 in length.
- Later CD pressings separate tracks differently than the LP, resulting in "The Rainbow" lasting 8:02 and "Eden" lasting 7:39.

== Personnel ==
Talk Talk

- Mark Hollis – vocals, electric guitar, organ, melodica, piano, and Variophon (uncredited)
- Lee Harris – drums
- Paul Webb – electric bass guitar

Additional personnel

- Tim Friese-Greene – harmonium, piano, organ, guitar
- Martin Ditcham – percussion
- Robbie McIntosh – dobro, twelve-string guitar
- Mark Feltham – harmonica
- Simon Edwards – Mexican bass
- Danny Thompson – double bass
- Henry Lowther – trumpet
- Nigel Kennedy – violin
- Hugh Davies – shozygs
- Andrew Stowell – bassoon
- Michael Jeans – oboe
- Andrew Marriner – clarinet
- Christopher Hooker – cor anglais
- Choir of Chelmsford Cathedral
- Phill Brown – engineering, bowed guitar
- Tim Friese-Greene – production
- James Marsh – cover art

== Charts ==
| Chart (1988) | Peak position |
|---|---|
| Dutch Albums (Album Top 100) | 32 |
| German Albums (Offizielle Top 100) | 16 |
| Swiss Albums (Schweizer Hitparade) | 12 |
| UK Albums (Official Charts) | 19 |

| Chart (2019–2025) | Peak position |
|---|---|
| Belgian Albums (Ultratop Flanders) | 77 |
| Belgian Albums (Ultratop Wallonia) | 127 |
| Hungarian Physical Albums (MAHASZ) | 18 |
| Scottish Albums (Official Charts) | 18 |
| UK Albums (Official Charts) | 63 |
| UK Album Downloads (Official Charts) | 7 |

== Certifications ==
| Region | Certification | Certified units/sales |
|---|---|---|
| United Kingdom (BPI) | Silver | 60,000^{^} |
Summaries
| Worldwide | — | 500,000 |
^{^} Shipments figures based on certification alone.
