= I Believe in You (Talk Talk song) =

1988 song by Talk Talk

Single by Talk Talk

from the album Spirit of Eden
- B-side: "John Cope"
- Released: 19 September 1988
- Length: 6:15 (album version); 3:40 (edited version)
- Label: Parlophone
- Songwriters: Mark Hollis; Tim Friese-Greene
- Producer: Tim Friese-Greene

Talk Talk singles chronology
"I Don't Believe in You" (1986)	"I Believe in You" (1988)	"It's My Life" (1990)

"I Believe in You" is a song by English band Talk Talk, released by Parlophone on 19 September 1988 as the only single from their fourth studio album Spirit of Eden. The song was written by Mark Hollis and Tim Friese-Greene, and produced by Friese-Greene. "I Believe in You" peaked at number 85 in the UK Singles Chart.

== Background ==
"I Believe in You" is an anti-heroin song. Speaking to Dutch magazine OOR in 1988, Hollis stated, "I've seen the misery that heroin can cause. I've known so many people who thought the stuff would never get hold of them and end up with a totally ruined life. I've seen what it takes to get rid of it. I think it's a horrible thing."

== Release ==
Talk Talk did not intend to release a single from Spirit of Eden, but after Parlophone expressed their wishes for a single, the band reconsidered and a radio edit of "I Believe in You" was released. Hollis expressed his disappointment in Parlophone's decision to release the song as a single, telling International Musician and Recording World in 1988, "They've basically just cut the beginning and end off the song. I think it's a shame. They've taken something which stood up on its own in the context of the album and pulled it out of context. It doesn't make sense to me." He added to Q that the single existed "purely to help the record company promote the album".

== Music video ==
The song's music video was directed by Tim Pope and produced by Lisa Bryer for MGMM Studios. It was shot at Bell Studios in London and features Hollis sitting with his guitar and singing the lyrics. Hollis soon expressed his regret over the video after it was shot. He told Q, "I really feel that was a massive mistake. I thought just by sitting there and listening and really thinking about what [the song] was about, I could get that in my eyes. But you cannot do it. It just feels stupid. It was depressing and I wish I'd never done it." He added to International Musician and Recording World, "That song means so much to me that to sit there and mime to it just feels totally stupid. It just felt like I was being prostituted. Tim felt exactly the same, 'cos he cares about that sort of thing."

== Critical reception ==
Upon its release as a single, Peter Kane of Sounds felt that "I Believe in You" "makes for a genuinely moody and queer little 45". He stated, "Hollis has wandered about as far away from 'Life's What You Make It' as he could without falling off the edge. The result is interesting, as in, I'd like to hear more." He noted the unlikely commercial success of the single by adding that it was "the sound of a man seemingly hell-bent on ritual commercial suicide". Andrew Hirst of the Huddersfield Daily Examiner praised it as a "ponderous, deeply atmospheric ballad", but also believed it had limited commercial appeal by commenting, "The band has drifted an age away from its original pop leanings and this dulcet delight is far too profound to grab a slice of the commercial cake."

Caren Myers of Melody Maker described the song as "broody" and added, "This just kind of floats right through you, as the synths and the voice compete to see who can sound more evanescent and soothing." Jerry Smith of Music Week commented, "Having moved well away from their original pop leanings, Talk Talk these days produce thoroughly irresistible, hauntingly atmospheric tracks and this one is beguilingly catchy." Johnny Dee of Record Mirror was critical of the song, calling it "droning twaddle". He commented, "A band who crawl out of dank, sleepy hollows to record what they call 'artistic masterpieces'. The kind of guys who make Duran Duran sound like the Wonder Stuff."

In 2017, Graeme Thomson of The Guardian included the song on a retrospective "10 of the best" list for the band, praising it as "perhaps [their] saddest, most straightforwardly beautiful song" which is "suffused with a personal sense of unutterable waste". He noted how the song is "driven by a quietly insistent rhythm" and is the closest thing on Spirit of Eden to a "conventional song". He added that the single version was "unsatisfactorily truncated".

== Track listing ==
7–inch single (UK and Europe)

1. "I Believe in You" (Edited version) – 3:40
2. "John Cope" – 4:43

7–inch promotional single (UK and Canada)

1. "I Believe in You" (Edit) – 3:40
2. "I Believe in You" (Edit) – 3:40

12–inch single (UK and Europe)

1. "I Believe in You" – 6:03
2. "John Cope" – 4:43
3. "Eden" (Edited version) – 4:23

CD single (UK)

1. "I Believe in You" – 6:03
2. "John Cope" – 4:43
3. "Eden" (Edited version) – 4:23

== Charts ==
Chart (1988)	Peak position
Italy Airplay (Music & Media)	7
Netherlands (Single Top 100)	65
New Zealand (Recorded Music NZ)	43
UK Singles (Official Charts)	85
