= Mark Hollis (album) =

Studio album by Mark Hollis
- Released: 26 January 1998
- Recorded: 1997
- Genres: Post-rock; art rock; folk; folk jazz; baroque pop; jazz
- Length: 46:59
- Label: Polydor
- Producer: Mark Hollis

Professional ratings
Review scores
Source	Rating
AllMusic	4.5/5 stars
Consequence of Sound	A
The Guardian	4/5 stars
The Independent	2/5 stars
Mojo	4/5 stars
NME	8/10
Pitchfork	9.0/10
Q	3/5 stars
Sputnikmusic	5/5
Uncut	4/5 stars

Mark Hollis is the only solo album by English musician Mark Hollis, after the breakup of his earlier group Talk Talk. The album was released on Polydor Records on 26 January 1998, and reissued on Pond Life on 13 March 2000. In 2003, the album was released in LP format on Universal Records.

The album is noted for its emphasis on acoustic instrumentation (a departure from Hollis's more electronic work with Talk Talk), and for being extremely sparse and minimal; AllMusic called it "quite possibly the most quiet and intimate record ever made". Hollis found inspiration not in the popular music of the day, but rather in 20th-century classical music and jazz from the late fifties and sixties.

The album did not mark a return for Hollis to the music industry or live performance; he stated at the time of the album's release that "There won't be any gig, not even at home in the living room. This material isn't suited to play live."

== Recording ==
The album was recorded as part of a two-album contract with Polydor, along with Talk Talk's 1991 Laughing Stock. At one point, the record was to be titled Mountains of the Moon and released under the Talk Talk name, but eventually it was decided it should be a self-titled solo project (early promotional CD-Rs and cassettes of the album contain the original details, with the CD-R retaining the attribution to Talk Talk). Recording and mixing the album was a slow and methodical process: the multitracks for each song were recorded on analog tape with a pair of Neumann M 49 microphones, then digitally composited and overdubbed with a ProDigi X-850 tape recorder before being mixed back onto analog tape. At Hollis's insistence, the faders were all kept at the same level, and the level of each instrument was determined by its proximity to the microphone. Warne Livesey was producing the sessions, but he was allegedly dismissed after he moved one of the faders.

Engineer Phill Brown, who also recorded Laughing Stock, stated that, compared to the final Talk Talk album, which he considered "one of [Phill Brown's] best projects" but "dark and claustrophobic", he found the solo release "the opposite…- open, restful and at times fantastically beautiful".

On 11 October 2011, Ba Da Bing Records released Mark Hollis on vinyl, marking the first time the album was issued on vinyl in the US. A reissue of the album was released on 18 October 2019 through UMC/Polydor.

== Background and content ==
"A Life (1895 - 1915)", which has been called "the album's epic centrepiece" refers to Roland Leighton (1895–1915), a British soldier and poet who was the fiancé of Vera Brittain at the time of his death in World War I. Hollis has stated about the song, "That was someone born before the turn of the century…and dying within one year of the First World War at a young age. It was based on Vera Brittain's boyfriend. It's the expectation that must have been in existence at the turn of the century, the patriotism that must've existed at the start of the war and the disillusionment that must've come immediately afterwards. It's the very severe mood swings that fascinated me." The song correspondingly contains a variety of styles, tempi, and instrumentations.

During the mid-1990s, an A&R man introduced Dominic Miller to Mark Hollis. The two began a series of jam sessions at Hollis's home studio, with Hollis playing 12-string guitar and Miller playing a guitar with nylon strings. During this period they wrote the song "Westward Bound" together.

== Cover art ==
The cover photo, taken by Stephen Lovell-Davis, is of southern Italy Easter bread designed to resemble the lamb of god. Lovell-Davis stated that Hollis selected the photo "much to the consternation of the record company."

Hollis stated about the image, "I like the way something appears to come out of his head; it makes me think of a fountain of ideas. Also the manner how the eyes are positioned fascinates me. When I saw the picture for the first time I had to laugh, but there's something very tragic about it at the same time."

== Track listing ==
No.	Title	Writer(s)	Length
1.	"The Colour of Spring"	Mark Hollis, Phil Ramacon	3:52
2.	"Watershed"	Hollis, Warne Livesey	5:45
3.	"Inside Looking Out"	Hollis	6:21
4.	"The Gift"	Hollis, Livesey	4:22
5.	"A Life (1895 - 1915)"	Hollis, Livesey	8:10
6.	"Westward Bound"	Hollis, Dominic Miller	4:18
7.	"The Daily Planet"	Hollis, Livesey	7:19
8.	"A New Jerusalem"	Hollis, Livesey	6:49
Total length:			46:59

== Personnel ==
=== Musicians ===
- Mark Hollis – vocals, guitar
- Martin Ditcham – drums, percussion
- Chris Laurence – double bass
- Lawrence Pendrous – piano, harmonium
- Iain Dixon – clarinet
- Tim Holmes – clarinet
- Mark Feltham – harmonica
- Henry Lowther – trumpet
- Andy Panayi – flute
- Melinda Maxwell – cor anglais
- Dominic Miller – guitar
- Robbie McIntosh – guitar
- Maggie Pollock – bassoon
- Julie Andrews – bassoon

=== Technical ===
- Phill Brown – engineer
- Mark Hollis – producer
- Cally and Crane – design
- Stephen Lovell-Davis – photograph
