= Living in Another World =

- Seven-inch picture disc

Single by Talk Talk

from the album The Colour of Spring
- B-side: "For What It's Worth"
- Released: 3 March 1986
- Recorded: 1985, London
- Studio: Battery Studios; Videosonics Studios
- Genre: New wave
- Length: 4:11 (7" Version); 6:58 (Album Version); 8:59 (12" Version)
- Label: EMI; Parlophone
- Songwriters: Mark Hollis; Tim Friese-Greene
- Producer: Tim Friese-Greene

Talk Talk singles chronology
"Life's What You Make It" (1985)	"Living in Another World" (1986)	"Give It Up" (1986)

Music video
- "Living in Another World" on YouTube

"Living in Another World" is a song by English band Talk Talk, released by EMI on 3 March 1986 as the second single from the band's third studio album The Colour of Spring. The single made the top 40 in Germany, Switzerland, the Netherlands and Flanders.

The track was one of those selected to promote contentious 1991 remix album History Revisited. The artwork for the single was by James Marsh. Hammond organ is played by guest musician Steve Winwood. Harmonica is played by guest musician Mark Feltham.

== Composition ==
The song has been noted for its cyclical musical structure. Kenny Anderson, a.k.a. King Creosote: "I never tire of [the song], and yet I don't quite understand how they managed to make it sound like a musical version of that famous Escher staircase." Songwriter Mark Hollis was inspired by the modal jazz of Miles Davis. In an interview on Italian TV in 1987, Hollis explained that the studies of Jean-Paul Sartre inspired the lyrics.

== Artwork ==
The illustration for the song continued the "moth" theme developed by James Marsh for the Colour of Spring album and singles. It was the only painting in the series to have pre-existed, having been created by Marsh for his first book. It appeared opposite a verse entitled "Tiger Moth".

== Music video ==
A promotional video for "Living in Another World" was directed by long-time collaborator Tim Pope. It features the band being suspended 20ft in the air (shot upside down but filmed the right way round), hanging onto a grand piano whilst a wind machine blows violently in their faces.

== Cover versions ==
"Living in Another World" was covered by Lights featuring Darkstars for the 2012 tribute album Spirit of Talk Talk.
