= The Colour of Spring =

Studio album by Talk Talk
- Released: 17 February 1986
- Recorded: 1985, London
- Studios: Battery, London; Videosonics Studios
- Genres: New wave; art pop; progressive pop; experimental rock
- Length: 45:41
- Label: EMI
- Producer: Tim Friese-Greene

Talk Talk chronology
It's My Life (1984)	The Colour of Spring (1986)	Spirit of Eden (1988)

Singles from The Colour of Spring
- 1. "Life's What You Make It" Released: 18 November 1985 (EU); 2. "Living in Another World" Released: 3 March 1986; 3. "Give It Up" Released: 6 May 1986; 4. "I Don't Believe in You" Released: 10 November 1986

The Colour of Spring is the third studio album by English band Talk Talk, released on 17 February 1986. Written by Mark Hollis and producer Tim Friese-Greene, the album combines elements of jazz and art pop in an effort by Hollis to embrace more organic instrumentation and production values. Unlike previous Talk Talk albums, synthesizers are rarely featured on the album, being replaced by guitar, piano, and organ. The album went on to become Talk Talk's greatest commercial success, spawning the hit singles "Life's What You Make It" and "Living in Another World" and reaching the Top 20 in numerous countries (topping the Dutch charts), including the UK, where it reached No. 8 and stayed in the UK charts for 21 weeks.

== Background ==
The Colour of Spring is commonly viewed as a bridge between Talk Talk's earlier, synthesized pop sound, and their later, more improvisation-based work. Despite the extensive use of synthesizers on the previous two albums, Hollis was vocal in his distaste for them, stating that they were used primarily for economic reasons and that “if they didn’t exist, I’d be delighted.” During the recording of the album, Hollis frequently listened to the music of composers such as Erik Satie, Claude Debussy, and Béla Bartók, with the latter being a particularly significant influence on the album.

Like other Talk Talk albums, outside musicians were heavily utilized. Guests contributing to the album include Robbie McIntosh adding guitar, and Steve Winwood, who played organ on the hit "Living in Another World", alongside "Happiness is Easy" and "I Don't Believe in You".

== Reception ==
Professional ratings
Review scores
Source	Rating
AllMusic	4.5/5 stars
Encyclopedia of Popular Music	4/5 stars
Mojo	4/5 stars
Q	4/5 stars
Sounds	3/5 stars
Uncut	9/10

The Colour of Spring became the band's highest selling non-compilation studio album, reaching the Top 20 in numerous countries (topping the Dutch charts), including the UK, where it reached No. 8 and stayed in the UK charts for 21 weeks. It did not quite match the sales of its predecessor in the United States but was nonetheless their last album to enter the Billboard 200, reaching number 58. With the international hit "Life's What You Make It", Talk Talk expanded their fan base. The song became the band's fourth of four American hits, along with 1982's "Talk Talk" and 1984's "It's My Life" and "Such a Shame".

The album was included in the book 1001 Albums You Must Hear Before You Die.

== Track listing ==
All tracks are written by Mark Hollis and Tim Friese-Greene.

Side one
No.	Title	Length
1.	"Happiness Is Easy"	6:30
2.	"I Don't Believe in You"	5:02
3.	"Life's What You Make It"	4:29
4.	"April 5th"	5:51
Total length:		21:52

Side two
No.	Title	Length
1.	"Living in Another World"	6:58
2.	"Give It Up"	5:17
3.	"Chameleon Day"	3:20
4.	"Time It's Time"	8:14
Total length:		23:49 45:41

== Personnel ==
Credits adapted from LP liner notes.

Talk Talk

- Lee Harris – drums (1–8)
- Mark Hollis – vocal (1–8), instrumental (1), piano (3, 5–7), Variophon (4, 7), organ (4), Mellotron (6), melodica (8), guitar (8)
- Paul Webb – bass guitar (2, 4–6, 8), backing vocal (3, 5)

Additional musicians

- Phil Reis – percussion (1)
- Morris Pert – percussion (1, 2, 5, 8)
- Martin Ditcham – percussion (1, 3, 5, 6, 8)
- Danny Thompson – acoustic bass (1)
- Alan Gorrie – electric bass (1)
- Steve Winwood – organ (1, 2, 5)
- Tim Friese-Greene – piano (1, 2, 8), Kurzweil (1, 4, 7), organ (3, 6, 8), Variophon (4, 7), Mellotron (3)
- Robbie McIntosh – guitar (1, 2, 5), Dobro (4, 6), acoustic guitar (8)
- Children from the school of Miss Speake – choir (1)
- Gaynor Sadler – harp (2)
- David Roach – soprano saxophone (2, 4, 5)
- Ian Curnow – instrumental (2, 6)
- David Rhodes – guitar (3, 5, 6)
- Mark Feltham – harmonica (5)
- Ambrosia Choir – choir (8)

Technical

- Tim Friese-Greene – producer
- Pete Wooliscroft – engineer
- Dennis Weinrich – engineer
- Paul Schroeder – engineer
- Dietmar Schillinger – engineer
- James Marsh – cover illustration
- Richard Haughton – photograph

== Charts ==
Chart (1986)	Peak position
Australia (Kent Music Report)	71
Austrian Albums (Ö3 Austria)	16
Dutch Albums (Album Top 100)	1
German Albums (Offizielle Top 100)	11
New Zealand Albums (RMNZ)	7
Norwegian Albums (VG-lista)	12
Scottish Albums (Official Charts)	70
Swedish Albums (Sverigetopplistan)	25
Swiss Albums (Schweizer Hitparade)	3
UK Albums (Official Charts)	8
UK Album Downloads (Official Charts)	36
US Billboard 200	58

Chart (2025–2026)	Peak position
Danish Vinyl Albums (Hitlisten)	36
Hungarian Physical Albums (MAHASZ)	23
Hungarian Vinyl Albums (MAHASZ)	9

=== Year-end charts ===
1986 year-end chart performance for The Colour of Spring
Chart (1986)	Position
European Albums (Music & Media)	22
UK Albums (Gallup)	79

== Certifications ==
Region	Certification	Certified units/sales
Canada (Music Canada)	Gold	50,000^{^}
Netherlands (NVPI)	Gold	50,000^{^}
United Kingdom (BPI)	Gold	100,000^{^}
^{^} Shipments figures based on certification alone.
