= Such a Shame =

Song by the English band Talk Talk

- Artwork for the original 12-inch vinyl release; the 7-inch has the same artwork with three vertical dots on the right sidebar

Single by Talk Talk

from the album It's My Life
- B-side: "Again, a Game... Again"
- Released: 26 March 1984
- Genre: Synth-pop
- Length: 3:59; 6:54 (12" single, A-side); 5:43 (12" single, B-side)
- Label: EMI; Parlophone
- Songwriter: Mark Hollis
- Producer: Tim Friese-Greene

Talk Talk singles chronology
"It's My Life" (1984)	"Such a Shame" (1984)	"Dum Dum Girl" (1984)

Music video
- "Such a Shame" on YouTube

"Such a Shame" is a song written by Mark Hollis for the English band Talk Talk's second album It's My Life (1984). It was released as the album's second single and went on to become a top 10 hit in several European countries.

== Overview ==
"Such a Shame" was inspired by Luke Rhinehart's The Dice Man, one of composer Mark Hollis' favourite books. When asked what drove him to respond to Rhinehart's book, Hollis replied, "A good book, not a lifestyle I'd recommend."

The song was released as the album's second single on 26 March 1984, with the cover art designed by James Marsh. Some pressings of the single came with an additional 7" release The Talk Talk Demos which included three songs recorded in June 1981: "Candy", "Talk Talk" and "Mirror Man". Writing in the NME, Richard Cook slated the song, describing it as "faceless regret coaxed from lurex trashcan."

"Such a Shame" became a hit in continental Europe in 1984 and 1985, reaching the top 10 in several countries, including number 1 in Switzerland. It was their third number 1 single after the re-recorded version of the song "Talk Talk", which topped the South African charts in 1983 and the single "It's My Life" which was number 1 in the US Billboard Hot Dance Club Play in 1984. In the US, "Such a Shame" entered the Billboard Hot 100, and was a top 20 hit in the Billboard Hot Dance Club Play. The single entered the top 10 in the pan-European singles airplay chart. It only reached number 49 in the UK.

The song was featured in a European TV commercial for the French car Peugeot 205 in the 1980s. In November 1990, the single was re-issued to promote the compilation Natural History: The Very Best of Talk Talk.

Following Hollis' death in early 2019, "Such a Shame" charted at number 5 on Digital Song Sales in France and number 44 on Back Catalogue Singles in the Flemish region of Belgium.

== Track listings ==
=== Original release ===
- 7" single (EMI 5433)

A. "Such a Shame" – 3:59
B. "Again, a Game... Again" – 4:06

- 12" maxi single (12EMI 5433)

A. "Such a Shame" (12" Mix) – 6:54
B1. "Such a Shame" – 5:43
B2. "Again, a Game... Again" – 4:06

=== 1990 release ===
- 7" single (R 6276)

A. "Such a Shame" (Original Version) – 4:28
B. "Dum Dum Girl" (Live from 1986 Montreux Jazz Festival) – 3:39

- 12" maxi single (12R 6276)

A. "Such a Shame" (Remixed by Gary Miller) – 5:40
B1. "Such a Shame" (Original Version) – 4:28
B2. "Dum Dum Girl" (Live from 1986 Montreux Jazz Festival) – 3:39

- CD maxi single (CDR 6276)
1. "Such a Shame" (Original Version) – 4:28
2. "Such a Shame" (Remixed by Gary Miller) – 5:40
3. "Talk Talk" (Live from 1986 Montreux Jazz Festival) – 3:30
4. "Dum Dum Girl" (Live from 1986 Montreux Jazz Festival) – 3:39

== Charts ==
=== Weekly charts ===
Chart (1984–1985)	Peak position
Austria (Ö3 Austria Top 40)	2
Belgium (Ultratop 50 Flanders)	13
Europe (European Top 100 Singles)	18
France (SNEP)	7
Italy (Musica e dischi)	1
Netherlands (Dutch Top 40)	11
Netherlands (Single Top 100)	9
New Zealand (Recorded Music NZ)	39
Switzerland (Schweizer Hitparade)	1
UK Singles (Official Charts)	49
US Billboard Hot 100	89
US Billboard Hot Dance Club Play	12
West Germany (GfK)	2

Chart (1990)	Peak position
UK Singles (Official Charts)	78

Chart (2022)	Peak position
Hungary (Single Top 40)	30

=== Year-end charts ===
Chart (1984)	Position
Austria (Ö3 Austria Top 40)	17
Netherlands (Dutch Top 40)	95
Netherlands (Single Top 100)	59
Switzerland (Schweizer Hitparade)	3
West Germany (Official German Charts)	4

== Sandra version ==
"Such a Shame"

Single by Sandra

from the album The Wheel of Time
- Released: 25 March 2002
- Length: 4:18
- Label: Virgin
- Songwriter: Mark Hollis
- Producers: Michael Cretu; Jens Gad

Sandra singles chronology
"Forever" (2001)	"Such a Shame" (2002)	"I Close My Eyes" (2002)

Licensed audio
- "Such A Shame" on YouTube

German singer Sandra covered "Such a Shame" for her seventh studio album The Wheel of Time (2002). Her version was produced by Michael Cretu and Jens Gad. It was released on 25 March 2002 and reached number 76 on the official German singles chart.

=== Track listing ===
- CD maxi single
1. "Such a Shame" (Radio Edit) – 4:18
2. "Such a Shame" (Straight Dance Mix) – 7:54
3. "Such a Shame" (Cool Club Mix) – 5:22
4. "Such a Shame" (Karaoke Version) – 4:18

=== Charts ===
Chart (2002)	Peak position
Germany (GfK)	76

== An Pierlé version ==
An Pierlé recorded a cover of "Such a Shame" for her 2013 album Strange Days. The song reached number 45 in the Walloon region of Belgium.

== See also ==
- List of number-one singles of the 1980s (Switzerland)
