= It's My Life (Talk Talk song) =

1984 single by Talk Talk

Single by Talk Talk

from the album It's My Life
- B-side: "Does Caroline Know?"
- Released: 3 January 1984
- Recorded: 1983
- Genre: Synth-pop; new wave
- Length: 3:50; 6:16 (extended remix)
- Label: EMI; Parlophone
- Songwriters: Mark Hollis; Tim Friese-Greene
- Producer: Tim Friese-Greene

Talk Talk singles chronology
"My Foolish Friend" (1983)	"It's My Life" (1984)	"Such a Shame" (1984)

Music video
- "It's My Life" on YouTube

"It's My Life"

Single by Talk Talk

from the album Natural History: The Very Best of Talk Talk
- A-side: "It's My Life" (Original Version)
- B-side: "Renée" (Live)
- Released: 7 May 1990
- Length: 3:53 (7-inch single and 12-inch single B-side); 5:58 (12-inch single); 3:54 (CD single track 2)
- Label: Parlophone
- Songwriter: Mark Hollis
- Producer: Tim Friese-Greene

Talk Talk singles chronology
"I Believe in You" (1988)	"It's My Life" (1990)	"Life's What You Make It" (1990)

"It's My Life" is a song by the English band Talk Talk. Written by Mark Hollis and Tim Friese-Greene, it was the title track on the band's second album, It's My Life (1984), and released as its first single on 3 January 1984. It became a moderate hit in many countries, reaching number 46 on the UK Singles Chart, number 33 in Germany, number 32 in New Zealand, number 25 in France, number nine in Italy, and number 30 in Canada. In the United States, it reached number 31 on the Billboard Hot 100. It was the group's only top 40 hit in the US. The song peaked at number one on the Billboard Dance/Disco Top 80 chart.

The single was re-released in the UK in 1985, reaching number 93. In May 1990, "It's My Life" was reissued again to promote the compilation album Natural History: The Very Best of Talk Talk. This time, the song reached number 13 in the UK becoming the band's highest charting single in their native country. In 2003, the American rock band No Doubt released a cover version that became a hit in several countries, including the US, where it reached number 10 on the Hot 100.

== Music video ==
There are two versions of the video for "It's My Life". The first, envisioned by director Tim Pope as a statement against the banality of lip-synching, consists almost entirely of footage from the wildlife documentaries, interspersed with shots of Talk Talk lead singer Mark Hollis standing in various places throughout the London Zoo. Hollis deliberately avoids performing to the camera: He keeps his hands in his coat pockets and his mouth is taped shut, the latter often obscured by hand-drawn animated lines that occasionally appear in the documentary footage sequences as well.

The second version, recorded at the behest of EMI, consisted of the entirety of the original video projected on a green screen behind Hollis on guitar and vocals as well as his two bandmates as they lip-synched and mimed the song, deliberately poorly and with comic exaggerated gestures.

== Personnel ==
Talk Talk

- Mark Hollis – lead and backing vocals, acoustic guitar
- Paul Webb – fretless bass guitar, backing vocals
- Lee Harris – Simmons drums, snare drum

Additional musicians

- Tim Friese-Greene – Oberheim OB-X and Fairlight CMI synthesizers, Roland TR-808 programming
- Ian Curnow – Roland Jupiter-8 synthesizers
- Robbie McIntosh – electric guitar
- Morris Pert – percussion

== Track listings ==
=== 1984 release ===
7-inch single

1. "It's My Life" – 3:51
2. "Does Caroline Know?" – 4:36

12-inch single – North America

1. "It's My Life" (Extended Version) – 6:14
2. "It's My Life" – 3:51
3. "Again, a Game...Again" – 4:09

12-inch single – Europe

1. "It's My Life" (12-inch Remix) – 6:16
2. "Does Caroline Know?" – 4:33
3. "It's My Life" – 3:51

=== 1990 reissue ===
7-inch single

1. "It's My Life" – 3:51
2. "Renée" (Live from Hammersmith Odeon) – 7:28

CD maxi

1. "It's My Life" – 3:51
2. "Renée" (Live from Hammersmith Odeon) – 7:28
3. "It's My Life" (Live from Hammersmith Odeon) – 7:58

== Charts ==
Chart (1984)	Peak position
Australia (Kent Music Report)	73
Canada Top Singles (RPM)	30
France (SNEP)	25
Italy (Musica e dischi)	9
Netherlands (Dutch Top 40)	31
Netherlands (Single Top 100)	30
New Zealand (Recorded Music NZ)	32
UK Singles (OCC)	46
US Billboard Hot 100	31
US Dance/Disco Top 80 (Billboard)	1
US Rock Top Tracks (Billboard)	23
US CHR/Pop Airplay (Radio & Records)	31
West Germany (GfK)	33

Chart (1990)	Peak position
Belgium (Ultratop 50 Flanders)	44
Belgium (VRT Top 30 Flanders)	29
Europe (Eurochart Hot 100)	38
Ireland (IRMA)	23
UK Singles (OCC)	13
West Germany (GfK)	49

== Certifications ==
Region	Certification	Certified units/sales
New Zealand (RMNZ)	Platinum	30,000^{‡}
United Kingdom (BPI)	Platinum	600,000^{‡}
^{‡} Sales+streaming figures based on certification alone.

== No Doubt version ==
"It's My Life"

Single by No Doubt

from the album The Singles 1992–2003
- Released: 20 October 2003
- Genre: Soft rock; new wave
- Length: 3:46
- Label: Interscope
- Songwriters: Mark Hollis; Tim Friese-Greene
- Producers: Nellee Hooper; No Doubt

No Doubt singles chronology
"Running" (2003)	"It's My Life" (2003)	"Bathwater" (Invincible Overlord remix) (2004)

Music video
- "It's My Life on YouTube

No Doubt recorded a cover version of "It's My Life" to promote their first greatest hits album The Singles 1992–2003 (2003). Because the band was on hiatus while lead singer Gwen Stefani recorded her solo debut album, Love. Angel. Music. Baby. (2004), they decided to record a cover to avoid having to write a new song. After considering hundreds of songs, they narrowed it down to two contenders – "It's My Life" by Talk Talk and "Don't Change" by Australian rock band INXS. "A Question of Lust" by English electronic band Depeche Mode was another close contender.

No Doubt later had second thoughts about recording a cover and contemplated writing new material. However, they became more comfortable after rehearsing "It's My Life" with producer Nellee Hooper, referring to it as a "feel-good" song. No Doubt's version of "It's My Life" was nominated for Best Pop Performance by a Duo or Group with Vocal at the 47th Annual Grammy Awards. Jacques Lu Cont, the song's programmer, created the Thin White Duke mix of "It's My Life", which won the award for Best Remixed Recording, Non-Classical.

=== Commercial performance ===
No Doubt's cover version was successful in the United States, reaching number 10 on the Billboard Hot 100, and remaining on the chart for 28 weeks. On the Radio & Records CHR/Pop Airplay chart, the song debuted at number 41 on 10 October 2003 issue, and after six weeks reached and peaked at number five, staying there for two non-consecutive weeks. It remained on the top ten of the chart for nine weeks and remained on it for 20 weeks.

It was moderately successful on adult contemporary stations, reaching number 20 on the US Adult Contemporary chart, but had high longevity and appeared atop the Adult Top 40's recurrent chart. The single was more successful at nightclubs, peaking at number 16 on the US Dance Club Songs chart, and had some play on modern rock stations, reaching number 32 on the US Alternative Songs chart. The Recording Industry Association of America certified the digital download Platinum for selling one million copies.

On the UK Singles chart, "It's My Life" debuted at number 20. It reached a higher position when it was released as a double A-side single with the Invincible Overlord remix of the song "Bathwater", which charted at number 17. It was more of a success across Europe, reaching the top ten in Italy, Finland, Germany, Ireland, the Netherlands, Norway and Sweden, and the top 20 in Austria, Belgium, France and Switzerland. The single reached number seven on the ARIA Charts in Australia, lasting 17 weeks on the chart, and was listed at number 81 on the 2004 year-end chart. The Australian Recording Industry Association certified the single Platinum in 2004 for shipping 70,000 copies.

=== Music video ===
The 1930s-style music video for the song was directed by David LaChapelle. In the video, Stefani portrays a black widow whose look closely resembles that of actress Jean Harlow, whom Stefani portrayed in the Martin Scorsese film The Aviator. She is put on trial and sentenced to death for the murders of three men she knew, who are portrayed by the other members of the band.

She kills the first man (guitarist Tom Dumont) with rat poison mixed into his dinner, the second (bassist Tony Kanal) by running him over with his car, and the third (drummer Adrian Young) by throwing her hair dryer into the bathtub to electrocute him. These scenes are intercut with moments of Stefani in court and being dragged to the gas chamber, wearing a prison uniform, where she is executed. The video ends with the three murder victims together, presumably in the afterlife, laughing at her televised execution.

The music video was moderately successful on video chart programs. On MTV's Total Request Live, it reached number seven in November 2003 and was on the countdown as late as January 2004. The video peaked at number eight on MuchMusic's Countdown and remained on the program through March 2004. At the 2004 MTV Video Music Awards, "It's My Life" won the awards for Best Group Video and Best Pop Video. It also received nominations for Best Direction, Best Cinematography, and Best Art Direction.

=== Track listing and formats ===
2-track

1. "It's My Life" – 3:46
2. "Rock Steady" (live) – 5:53

CD single

1. "It's My Life" – 3:46
2. "Sunday Morning" (2002 live) – 4:49
3. "Rock Steady" (2002 live) – 5:53
4. "Bathwater" (2002 live) – 4:01

UK CD single

1. "It's My Life" – 3:46
2. "Rock Steady" (2002 live) – 5:53
3. "Bathwater" (2002 live) – 4:01

UK re-issue "It's My Life" / "Bathwater" double A-side CD single

1. "It's My Life" – 3:46
2. "Bathwater" (Invincible Overlord Remix) – 3:07
3. "It's My Life" (Jacques Lu Cont's Thin White Duke Mix) – 6:59
4. "It's My Life" (Chocolate O'Brian Remix) – 5:43
5. "Bathwater" (Invincible Overlord Remix Video)
6. "It's My Life" (Video)

=== Charts ===
==== Weekly charts ====
Chart (2003–2004)	Peak position
Australia (ARIA)	7
Austria (Ö3 Austria Top 40)	12
Belgium (Ultratop 50 Flanders)	11
Belgium (Ultratop 50 Wallonia)	9
Canada (Nielsen SoundScan)	22
Canada CHR (Nielsen BDS)	2
Canada Hot AC Top 30 (Radio & Records)	6
CIS Airplay (TopHit)	51
Czech Republic (IFPI)	1
Europe (Eurochart Hot 100)	16
Finland (Suomen virallinen lista)	14
France (SNEP)	19
Germany (GfK)	9
Greece (IFPI)	5
Hungary (Rádiós Top 40)	5
Ireland (IRMA) with "Bathwater"	6
Italy (FIMI)	7
Netherlands (Dutch Top 40)	4
Netherlands (Single Top 100)	6
New Zealand (Recorded Music NZ)	8
Norway (VG-lista)	3
Poland (Nielsen Music Control)	1
Portugal (AFP)	5
Quebec (ADISQ)	4
Romania (Romanian Top 100)	29
Russia Airplay (TopHit)	28
Scottish Singles Sales (Official Charts)	12
Sweden (Sverigetopplistan)	4
Switzerland (Schweizer Hitparade)	12
UK Singles (Official Charts)	20
UK Rock & Metal (Official Charts)	29
US Billboard Hot 100	10
US Adult Contemporary (Billboard)	20
US Adult Pop Airplay (Billboard)	3
US Alternative Airplay (Billboard)	32
US Dance Club Songs (Billboard); Remixes	16
US Dance Airplay (Billboard)	5
US Pop Airplay (Billboard)	5

==== Year-end charts ====
Chart (2003)	Position
CIS Airplay (TopHit)	87
Ireland (IRMA)	85
Russia Airplay (TopHit)	68
US Adult Top 40 (Billboard)	83

Chart (2004)	Position
Australia (ARIA)	81
Belgium (Ultratop 50 Wallonia)	84
Brazil (Crowley)	29
Germany (Media Control GfK)	78
Hungary (Rádiós Top 40)	22
Netherlands (Dutch Top 40)	17
Netherlands (Single Top 100)	54
Sweden (Hitlistan)	58
Switzerland (Schweizer Hitparade)	67
US Billboard Hot 100	38
US Adult Top 40 (Billboard)	11
US Dance Radio Airplay (Billboard)	21
US Mainstream Top 40 (Billboard)	22

=== Certifications ===
Region	Certification	Certified units/sales
Australia (ARIA)	Platinum	70,000^{^}
Norway (IFPI Norway)	Platinum	10,000^{*}
New Zealand (RMNZ)	Gold	15,000^{‡}
United Kingdom (BPI)	Silver	200,000^{‡}
United States (RIAA)	Platinum	1,000,000^{‡}
^{*} Sales figures based on certification alone.^{^} Shipments figures based on certification alone.^{‡} Sales+streaming figures based on certification alone.

=== Release history ===
Region	Version	Date	Format(s)	Label(s)	Ref.
United States	"It's My Life"	20 October 2003	Contemporary hit; alternative radio	Interscope	
Australia	"It's My Life"	17 November 2003	CD	Interscope	
United Kingdom	"It's My Life"	24 November 2003	CD	Interscope	
United Kingdom	"It's My Life" / "Bathwater"	1 March 2004	CD	Interscope	
