= It's My Life (album) =

Studio album by Talk Talk
- Released: 13 February 1984
- Recorded: 1983
- Genre: Synth-pop
- Length: 43:13
- Labels: EMI (UK); EMI America (US)
- Producer: Tim Friese-Greene

Talk Talk chronology
The Party's Over (1982)	It's My Life (1984)	The Colour of Spring (1986)

Singles from It's My Life
- 1. "It's My Life" Released: 3 January 1984; 2. "Such a Shame" Released: 26 March 1984; 3. "Dum Dum Girl" Released: 16 July 1984

Professional ratings
Review scores
Source	Rating
AllMusic	4/5 stars
Encyclopedia of Popular Music	3/5 stars
Mojo	2/5 stars
Q	3/5 stars
Uncut	8/10

It's My Life is the second studio album by English band Talk Talk, released by EMI on 13 February 1984.

The cover of the album was designed by James Marsh, incorporating elements of The Boyhood of Raleigh by John Everett Millais.

== Release ==
It's My Life was a top 5 hit album in several European countries, thanks to the international success of its singles (notably "Such a Shame"), and was particularly successful in Switzerland, the Netherlands and Germany, where the album peaked at numbers 2, 3 and 4, respectively. In the Netherlands, the album stayed in the charts for 64 weeks between 1984 and 1986. It also reached number 35 in the UK albums chart. In the United States, the album just missed the top 40, reaching number 42.

In 2000, it was voted number 872 in Colin Larkin's All Time Top 1000 Albums.

In 2021, Rhino Entertainment re-released the album on limited edition purple vinyl.

== Track listing ==
Side one
No.	Title	Writer(s)	Length
1.	"Dum Dum Girl"	Tim Friese-Greene; Mark Hollis	3:51
2.	"Such a Shame"	Hollis	5:42
3.	"Renée"	Hollis	6:22
4.	"It's My Life"	Friese-Greene; Hollis	3:50
Total length:			19:45

Side two
No.	Title	Writer(s)	Length
1.	"Tomorrow Started"	Hollis	5:57
2.	"The Last Time"	Ian Curnow; Hollis	4:23
3.	"Call in the Night Boy"	Simon Brenner; Hollis	3:47
4.	"Does Caroline Know?"	Hollis	4:40
5.	"It's You"	Hollis	4:41
Total length:			23:28 43:13

== Personnel ==
Talk Talk

- Mark Hollis – vocals
- Lee Harris – drums
- Paul Webb – bass guitar

Additional musicians

- Tim Friese-Greene – keyboards
- Ian Curnow – keyboards
- Phil Ramocon – piano
- Robbie McIntosh – guitars
- Morris Pert – percussion
- Henry Lowther – trumpet

Technical

- Tim Friese-Greene – producer
- Walter Samuel – mixing ("Call in the Night Boy")
- James Marsh – cover illustration
- KB4Ai – design

== Charts ==
=== Weekly charts ===
Chart (1984–1986)	Peak position
Dutch Albums (Album Top 100)	3
German Albums (Offizielle Top 100)	4
New Zealand Albums (RMNZ)	27
Swedish Albums (Sverigetopplistan)	49
Swiss Albums (Schweizer Hitparade)	2
UK Albums (Official Charts)	35
US Billboard 200	42

Chart (2020)	Peak position
Scottish Albums (Official Charts)	47

Chart (2024)	Peak position
Hungarian Physical Albums (MAHASZ)	22
UK Progressive Albums (Official Charts)	10

=== Year-end charts ===
Chart (1984)	Position
Dutch Albums (Album Top 100)	10
German Albums (Offizielle Top 100)	18
Swiss Albums (Schweizer Hitparade)	22

Chart (1985)	Position
Dutch Albums (Album Top 100)	74
German Albums (Offizielle Top 100)	70

== Certifications ==
Region	Certification	Certified units/sales
France (SNEP)	Gold	
Germany (BVMI)	Gold	250,000^{^}
Netherlands (NVPI)	Platinum	100,000^{^}
^{^} Shipments figures based on certification alone.
