= Phill Brown =

British audio engineer and record producer (born 1950)

- Occupation: Audio engineer
- Years active: 60
- Era: 1960's until present
- Employer: Olympic Studios

Phill Brown (born January 4, 1950) is an audio engineer who has worked with a number of well-known musicians, including: Traffic, Led Zeppelin, David Bowie, Cat Stevens, Bob Marley, Babasonicos and Talk Talk. He is also the younger brother of Terry Brown.

== Career ==
Brown began his career at Olympic Studios in London. He worked as the studio's tape-operator on Jimi Hendrix's All Along The Watchtower and Beggars Banquet by The Rolling Stones. Later, Brown worked on Bob Marley's I Shot the Sheriff.

== See also ==
- Are We Still Rolling?, published in 2011, covers Brown's involvement throughout 40 years of the British music industry.
