= Variophon =

Electronic wind instrument

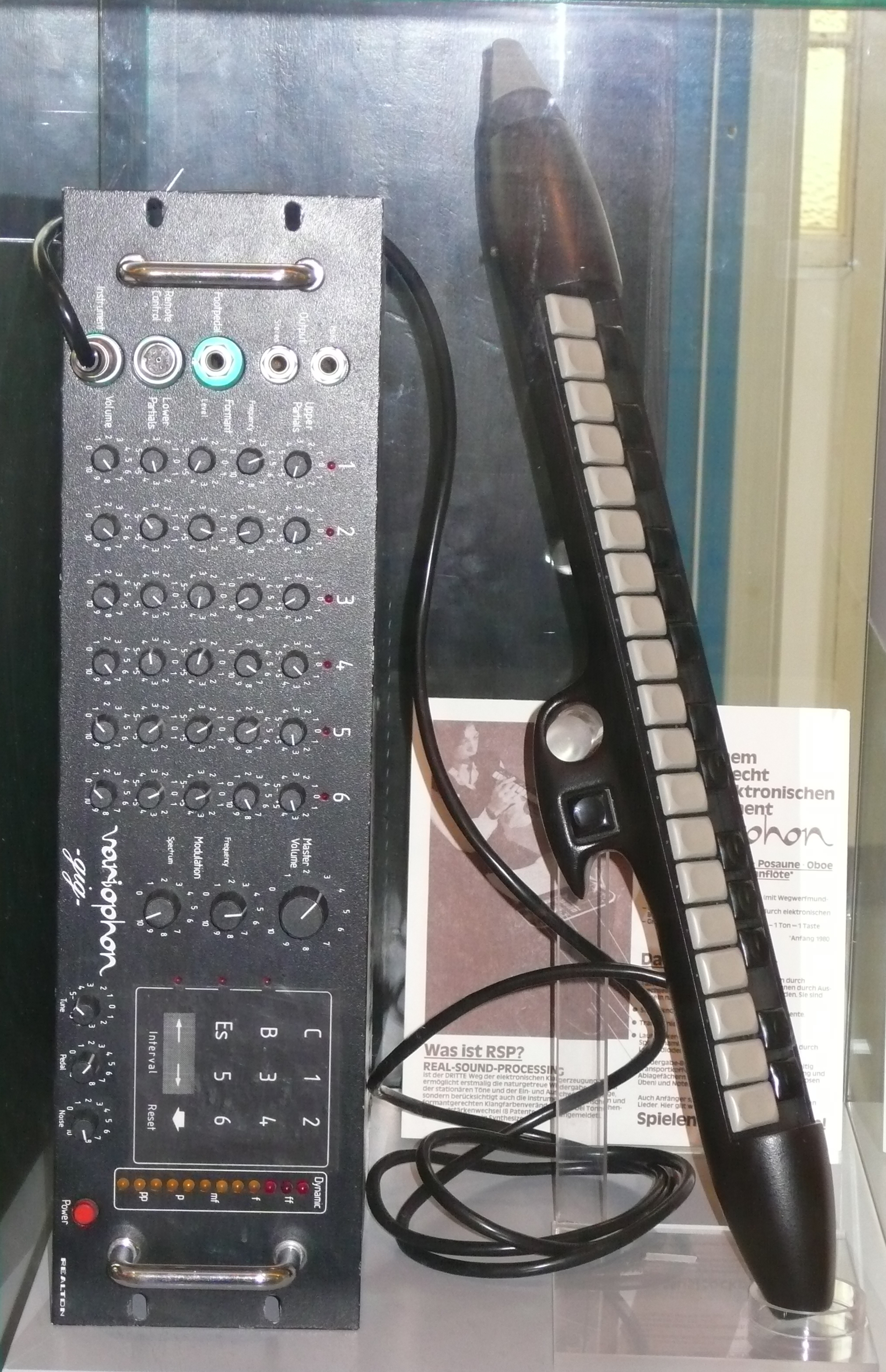
Variophon at the Technisches Museum Wien

A Variophon is an electronic wind instrument invented in 1975 by researchers at the University of Cologne. It synthesizes sounds using the principle of most common brass instruments, creating sounds based on the vibration of the player's lips and breath and the resonance in a particular body. For this purpose, the instrument is played using a pipe-controller, while the pitch is controlled either by keys on the pipe itself or in later models, an external keyboard. The Variophon can alternate in timbres, imitating a variety of wind instruments, ranging from the harmonica to clarinet, saxophone or tuba. The variophon has a processing unit, dubbed "the music cockpit" which the controller must be connected to. The controlling voltages of the blow controller and keys combine to influence the shape, width, and height of the electric pulses. The pulses it creates are modeled by the pulse formations of real wind instrument sounds, which is how the variophon replicates the sounds of these instruments.

== History ==
The original Variophon, named the "Martinetta", was invented in 1975 by Jobst Peter Fricke, Wolfgang Voigt and Jürgen Schmitz at the Acoustical Department of the Musicological Institute of the University of Cologne, and was first manufactured by Ernest Martin KG. The controller of this original model is shaped and played similar to a clarinet, attached to it is an amplifier that processes the signals from the controller and plays back the resulting sounds.

In 1978, German instrument manufacturer Realton took over distribution rights and presented three new models at the Frankfurt Music Fair in 1980: The "Variophon Spot", a small box very similar to the original, but without an onboard speaker, the bigger "Variophon Standard" with speakers and connectivity for headphones, and the "Variophon Gig" that was intended for studio purposes, coming in a 19" rack-case. All three models have a number of knobs to modulate and filter the sounds created. Also, new controllers were introduced: Variations of the handheld blow controller with different keys, and a simpler pipe-controller on a chord that could be played simultaneously with a keyboard.

== Variophon in Use ==
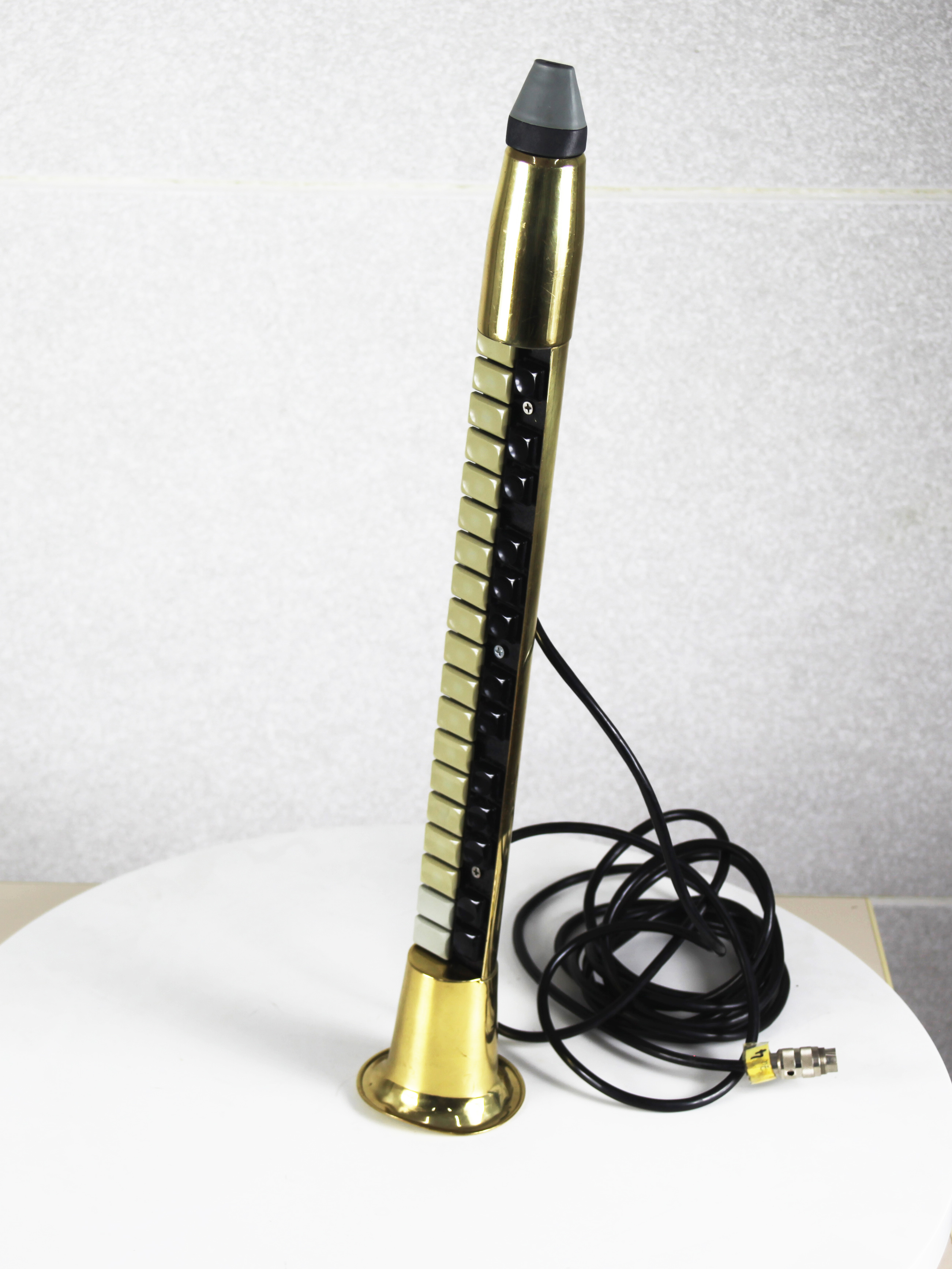
Variophon Breath Controller, designed for connection to Variophon spot, gig, or standard models, produced by Realton in the early 1980s

Sound Example of the Variophon Breath Controller

Martinetta, a precursor to the Variophon, built in 1975 by Jürgen Schmitz as a proof of concept for impulse shaping synthesis, developed by Jobst Fricke and Wolfgang Voigt in Cologne.

The Variophon is used extensively on Talk Talk's third album The Colour of Spring.

In 2006, Voigt and Fricke returned to the University of Cologne and presented the Martinetta in a series of short videos.
