= Tim Friese-Greene =

British musician and record producer

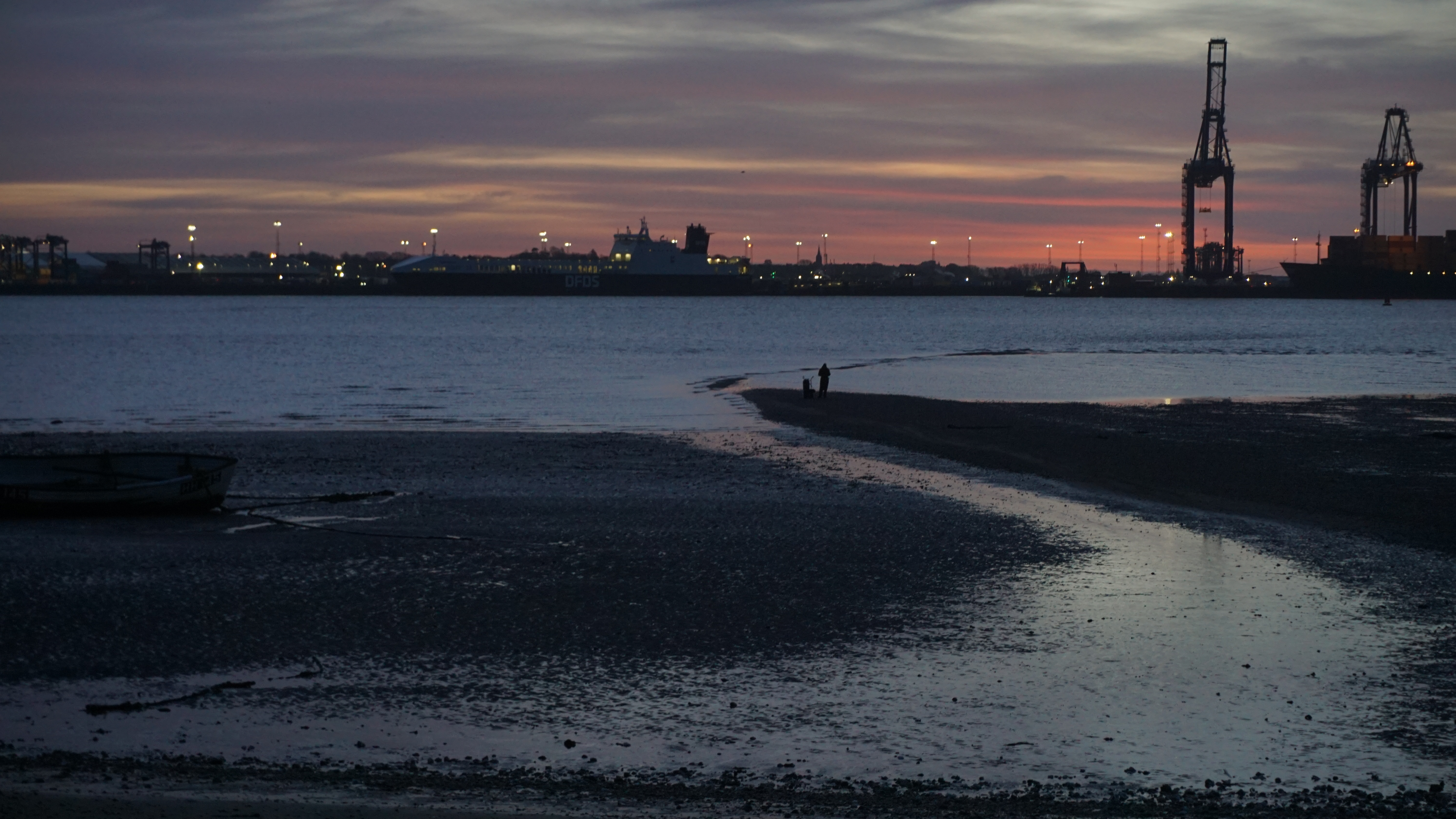
- TF-G undocumented performances

Background information
- Occupations: Musician, songwriter, producer
- Years active: 1974–present
- Website: timfriesegreene.co.uk

Tim Friese-Greene is a British musician, songwriter and producer active since the 1970s. He worked with Talk Talk, co-writing three, and producing four of the band’s albums between 1984 and 1991: It’s My Life, The Colour of Spring, Spirit of Eden and Laughing Stock. Although not credited as an official member, his arrival was described at the time by Record Collector magazine as a ‘watershed’ for the band, becoming Mark Hollis’s principal studio collaborator, his co‑writer and producer during the band’s later career.

As an artist in his own right, Friese-Greene worked from the 1990s under the alias of Heligoland and from 2009 under his own name, and also as one half of Short-Haired Domestic with Lee Friese-Greene. In later years he also began a series of ‘undocumented performances’, consisting of unrecorded outdoor improvisations, reflecting an interest in ephemeral forms of musical expression.

== Early life and career ==
Friese‑Greene is the great-grandson of photographer and inventor William Friese-Greene, an early motion-picture pioneer, and the grandson of filmmaker Claude Friese-Greene, known for the 1926 film series The Open Road.

Friese‑Greene’s interest with music began at a young age, later recalling that learning to play piano from age 11 was the point at which he began to write songs. His musical upbringing and formative years blended the output from pirate radio stations such as Radio Caroline, and what he later described as bold classical music. In 2022 Friese-Greene also cited influences, such as Sun Ra and My Bloody Valentine.

Shortly before leaving school, he was taken by a friend working as a tape operator, to Air Studios in London. According to Friese-Greene, his younger self was fascinated by the possibilities of working in a studio environment, becoming interested in how recordings achieved their particular sound, and how individual elements could be assembled into a coherent whole.

After leaving school he entered the recording industry in June 1974, learning his trade at Wessex Studios as a tape operator (tape-op).

His first tape-op role at Wessex Studios was for Queen as part of the Sheer Heart Attack sessions, and he progressed rapidly from tape‑op to engineer. Although the norm was for the tape-op to shadow the engineer, eventually taking an engineering role when available, it happened that two engineers left Wessex in quick succession. The young Friese-Greene was promoted to fill the gap, thereby having a much shorter apprenticeship.

His first full production credit came with Peter Straker's 1978 album Changeling, a project offered to him by Freddie Mercury, who was then mentoring Straker. Friese-Greene would later reflect on the benefits of his Wessex education, which by the mid 1980’s had already seen the role of the tape-op diminish with increasing studio automation. This reduced the level of engagement and learning opportunities for aspiring entrants, including the chance to learn practically on the job, and develop softer skills such as studio diplomacy. As a producer, Friese-Greene favoured close involvement in the recording process, saying that he wanted to understand even small adjustments made by an engineer, so that he knew precisely what was being captured.

By the early 1980s, Friese-Greene was managed by the Zomba Corporation and was producing a range of artists in both the United Kingdom and the United States. Despite maintaining a busy workload, he later recalled finding the period creatively unfulfilling. Almost a decade after starting as a tape operator at Wessex Studios, Friese-Greene had enjoyed commercial success, most notably with Tight Fit, whose cover version of ‘The Lion Sleeps Tonight’ was the fourth best-selling UK single of 1982. He later recalled that the project's success became a professional disadvantage, as it made it harder for him to obtain the projects he wanted.

Although the association with Tight Fit was not perceived by Friese-Greene as something to applaud, these chart entries, along with Blue Zoo and Thomas Dolby would shortly bring him to the attention of the Talk Talk camp.

== Work with Talk Talk ==
=== It’s My Life (1984) ===
Friese‑Greene joined up with Talk Talk during the making of the It’s My Life album. He didn’t recall much to single out the first Talk Talk album The Party’s Over beyond the rest of its contemporaries but explained "...I thought that Mark [Hollis] sounded okay. I took it on because there was nothing else around that I wanted to do more at the time, and there was nothing I disliked more than not working..."

Friese-Greene completed the record, and alongside holding the reins of the production duties also co-wrote two singles with Hollis - It’s My Life and Dum Dum Girl. Although having written before for various artists, being encouraged by the Zomba hierarchy to do so, this was a new angle for Friese-Greene. He recalled there wasn’t enough material for the Talk Talk record, with Hollis suggesting they write together, which they did on the piano at Friese-Greene’s home.

The album was particularly well received in continental Europe, with Friese-Greene’s production described in Electronic Soundmaker & Computer Music magazine as ‘stunning’. Hollis later said that the band’s European success with It’s My Life had given them greater creative freedom when making The Colour of Spring.

=== The Colour of Spring (1986) ===
For The Colour of Spring album, the Hollis/Friese‑Greene partnership had deepened into a genuine co‑writing relationship. Commentators have identified the album as a transitional work between Talk Talk's earlier synth-pop sound and their later experimental recordings. Hollis explained that the duo spent four months songwriting before entering the studio to record.

Technology remained an important part of the creative process, with songs often constructed from loops created on a Fairlight 2 recently purchased by Friese-Greene, something which he later said dated the album to the 1980s more than anything else. Hollis reflected after the release, that the band used synthesisers to approximate organic sounds when real instrumentation was not affordable, and that the success of It’s My Life gave them the resources to make The Colour of Spring on their own terms. Although the album made use of contemporary technology, Friese-Greene continued to favour the spontaneity of human performance over mechanical precision, arguing that imperfections could add character to a recording.

Contemporary reviews noted the change in approach, a move away from the synth-pop of previous records, with Friese-Greene tipping Talk Talk even closer to Hollis’ ideal sound.

The album was a commercial success, containing four singles in all, and spent 21 weeks in the UK charts, 14 of which were in the top 40. Life’s What You Make It, the first single, released in January 1986 went on to spend 16 weeks in the UK charts, reaching the top 20. Friese-Greene later expressed mixed feelings about this single, saying that the main element he still admired was Mark Hollis’s piano solo.

=== Spirit of Eden (1988) ===
By the recording of Spirit of Eden, Talk Talk were evolving into a different type of band, with Hollis latterly stating that for this album and Laughing Stock, ‘Talk Talk’ only represented the name under which the records were released. Friese-Greene recalled in 2006 that Hollis had decided after The Colour of Spring that he no longer wanted to tour, and Hollis described performing material from The Colour of Spring as becoming harder to recreate live.

Hollis and Friese-Greene would both play piano, organ, variophon and guitar as their compositions took shape in the studio. Of this partnership and shared vision, Friese-Greene explained "...it was source of continual frustration to us that we had to constantly explain to other musicians what we wanted. In the end we would just shrug and say 'We’ll do it then'".

The making, reception and enduring interest in Spirit of Eden is covered extensively elsewhere, with the album's unconventional nature leading some contemporary critics to describe it as impossible to review, uncommonly beautiful and the antithesis of an A&R man’s best friend. The challenge for A&R was that the album contained no obvious singles, with Hollis explaining the promotional video for the song I Believe in You to be a mistake. Nor were any tracks at a particularly fast tempo, or suited to live performance. Friese-Greene argued that the reduced pace was central to the record’s effect, because the slower the music became, the more weight each individual sound or event carried.

Spirit of Eden was the album Hollis described as what he’d 'been reaching for' and best listened to at night with no distractions. Although the album later attracted considerable critical appreciation, Friese-Greene commented in 2006 that he regarded the album as overly polished and somewhat earnest, suggesting that it might have benefited from a lighter element. He added that after Spirit of Eden he found it harder to identify outside projects he considered sufficiently challenging, because his work with Hollis had been so fulfilling. He suggested the need to explore other production avenues had receded.

Following the commercial disappointment of Spirit of Eden, EMI released a ‘Best Of’ Talk Talk album, entitled Natural History in 1990. The album spent 21 weeks in the UK charts, with five weeks in the top 10. The following year, EMI released History Revisited – The Remixes.

=== Laughing Stock (1991) ===
When discussing the genesis of Laughing Stock, Friese-Greene reflected he'd remained interested in ‘noise’ as a musical element. He explained that the album was noisier than Spirit of Eden at his request and was an intriguing album to make. As with Spirit of Eden, the recording of Laughing Stock has been discussed retrospectively for its extended improvised sessions, which some participants later described as difficult. Friese-Greene recounted that neither Hollis nor himself had such experiences, and that the recording was an evolution rather than revolution from Spirit of Eden. He later commented on the album, explaining he valued Laughing Stock for its abstract quality and for the deliberately lo-fi recording approach he had encouraged, which he felt made the album stronger.

Both Hollis and Friese-Greene emphasised the importance of preserving the freshness of an initial musical idea. When discussing his solo album, Hollis suggested that a musical idea was strongest at the moment it was first expressed. Friese-Greene extended this idea to live performance, arguing that music created through one-off improvisation could not easily be recreated without losing something essential. For that reason, he was sceptical of attempts to perform the final two Talk Talk albums live.

As with Spirit of Eden, the album was not initially a commercial success and received mixed reviews, being described by contemporary reviewers as bruised and grimy, unutterably pretentious and having a broody appeal. Also, as with Spirit of Eden, the album continued to slowly find its audience in the years that followed, seen as significant by reviewers in laying the foundations of ‘post-rock’ and the avenues explored by bands in subsequent years, such as Radiohead.

=== Dissolution of the Hollis/Friese-Greene partnership ===
Hollis consistently described the end of Talk Talk as a shared artistic conclusion reached with Friese‑Greene.

There was a need to find new approaches and a joint recognition that there was no new direction in which they could head.[44] However, whilst Friese-Greene described similar reasons, he added the ending was less of a mutual decision "...I knew from halfway through ‘Laughing Stock’ that it would be the last album that I would make with Talk Talk... I felt that that Mark [Hollis] and I had simply run our course...Mark wasn’t happy with that, but he didn’t have any choice."[11]

== Solo work and later production ==
Following the end of his tenure with Talk Talk, Friese-Greene continued to produce other artists while developing solo material. In the early 1990s he produced or co-produced records by artists including Lush and Catherine Wheel, whose work was associated with the shoegazing and alternative rock scenes. He later said that music by groups such as My Bloody Valentine and Lush had interested him because of their use of distortion, limited production values and willingness to embrace imperfection.

During this period Friese-Greene began recording under the name Heligoland. The project developed from experiments made with a four-track recorder in a small hut on Osea Island in the Blackwater Estuary. Friese-Greene later recalled that he was initially unsure whether to sing on the recordings, but that the process helped define the relationship between voice, instrumentation and distortion which characterised the material.

The first Heligoland release was the Creosote & Tar EP, issued on 1 January 1997 through Friese-Greene’s Calcium Chloride imprint. The label was established to release his own recordings, and the EP was described on his Bandcamp page as the surviving remainder of an earlier album CaCl 001, that had been abandoned because it was considered too derivative of Talk Talk. Friese-Greene played all the instruments on the EP, which drew on material begun during the Osea Island recordings and was completed at his home in south London.

A self-titled Heligoland album followed on 1 January 2000, with Friese-Greene writing the songs using an idiosyncratic five-string guitar tuning. Recorded on 24-track one-inch tape, it included contributions from Jim White of Dirty Three and members of Catherine Wheel. Contemporary and retrospective reviews noted the album’s raw sound and alienated atmosphere, with comparisons made to artists including Camper Van Beethoven, Pink Floyd and Jason Falkner.

Friese-Greene released a second Heligoland album, Pitcher, Flask & Foxy Moxie, on 1 January 2006. The recording was affected by a house move, the construction of a studio in an abandoned mattress factory and a hard-drive failure that resulted in the loss of a substantial amount of work. Around the album’s release, Friese-Greene described the importance of continuing to develop artistically, suggesting that working with unfamiliar instruments and techniques helped preserve a sense of naivety and discovery in his music. Although live Heligoland performances were considered, with John Parish reportedly prepared to learn the original five-string guitar tunings, the idea was eventually abandoned for practical reasons.

In 2009 Friese-Greene released 10 Sketches for Piano Trio under his own name rather than as Heligoland. The album was based on short pieces for piano, double bass and drums, all performed by Friese-Greene. Its title reflected the brevity and apparent improvisational character of the compositions, most of which were under three minutes long. Friese-Greene said that he avoided looping and click tracks, and that his limited experience as a drummer contributed to the record’s edge. Uncut magazine noted the album’s freeform qualities with Wire magazine describing its tension between improvisation and composition, while The Word characterised it as a demanding but rewarding listen.

In 2010 Friese-Greene provided audio stems from the Heligoland track Semantics Got Me Caned for a remix competition. His chosen winning remix, by DJ Roach, was later included on the Radio Brian Volume 2 cassette released by Brian Records in 2011. In August 2011 he performed live in Denmark as part of the Lilley Live series, accompanied by his son Jake. The set included material from his solo career as well as Talk Talk songs including Renee, John Cope and Runeii. A limited edition seven-inch single was released in connection with the performance.

Friese-Greene returned to solo releases in 2014 with One Girl Among Many, an EP described as the remains of an abandoned album of mainly Latin-influenced Hammond organ songs. The project was curtailed because of tinnitus. The following year he released the single I Would Change None for You, which included two accordion based pieces. One of the tracks had been intended for a possible folk-funk album, but that project was also abandoned because of hearing problems. Accompanying the single was a video, which features him writing a letter, inspired by the Jean-Luc Godard film called Vivre Sa Vie.

During the same period Friese-Greene returned to outside production work. He produced Firefly Burning’s albums Skeleton Hill in 2015 and Breathe Shallow in 2019. Difficult to categorise, the group was described by The Times as a more arty Kate Bush or a more folky Steve Reich, while Mojo magazine praised their originality, characterising their music as simultaneously old and futuristic. Friese-Greene later said that Firefly Burning were the first band in thirteen years to make him want to work again as a producer.

Following Mark Hollis’s death in 2019, Friese-Greene shared a rehearsal recording of the Talk Talk song Eden. The recording, taken from a cassette, was made available online.

In 2020 Friese-Greene formed Short-Haired Domestic with Lee Friese-Greene. The project combined slowed down funk, samples, breakbeats, noise and multilingual vocals. Friese-Greene said the idea of having each track sung in a different language came from Lee Friese-Greene’s ability to imitate languages, and that the project explored how much meaning could be communicated musically when listeners might not understand the words. The self-titled album was released in 2020, accompanied by two promotional videos A Song in Latin About the Importance of Comfortable Shoes and A Song in German Concerning Gardens and Goodbyes.

Friese-Greene released Melodic Apoptosis in 2022. The album was recorded during the first COVID-19 lockdown in a deserted language school and used drums, vibraphone, melodicas and strings. Friese-Greene said the melodica gave the record a deliberately lo-fi and ‘untutored’ quality, and that he avoided bass guitar in order to create harmonic ambiguity. The album was recorded in sequence and conceived as an instrumental narrative moving from trauma toward healing. A Super 8 video shot by his son Dylan was released to accompany the album. At the time of release Friese-Greene explained his current thoughts on songwriting '...I haven't for a while actually made a record where I've actually sat down and written a song...I'm not dissing it. I just, I feel that...the song format for me at the moment is not where my head's at. But that's not to say that I wouldn't go back to it.'

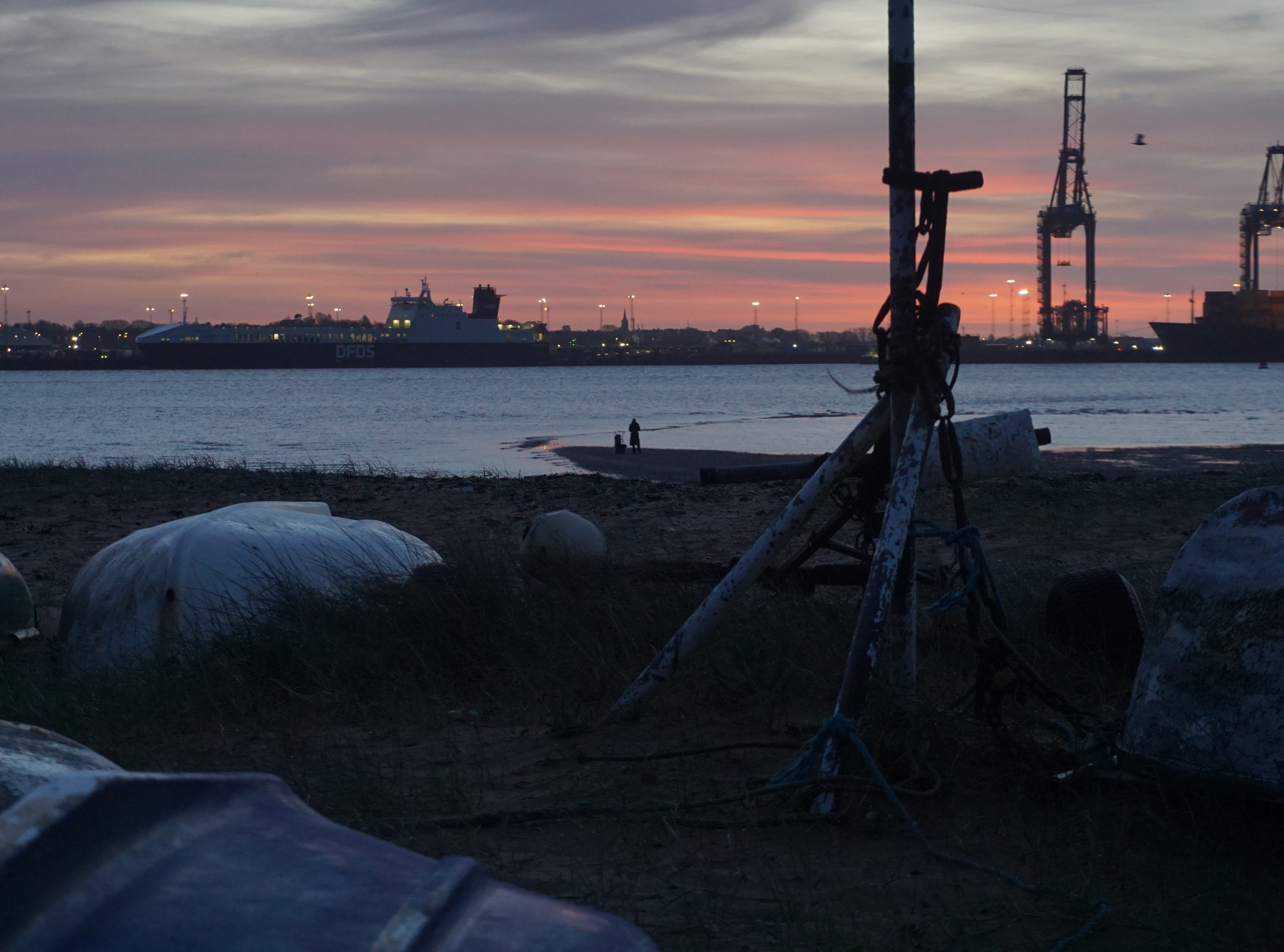
undocumented performances two

After Melodic Apoptosis, Friese-Greene’s website described a series of ‘undocumented performances’, consisting of unrecorded outdoor tidal constrained melodica improvisations over dub-based backing tracks.

== Reception and legacy ==
Friese-Greene has historically maintained a low public profile and has given few substantial interviews. However, Mark Hollis repeatedly emphasised Friese-Greene’s importance to Talk Talk. In early interviews, he said he had chosen Friese-Greene as producer because of the breadth of artists he had worked with, and because he did not impose a particular sound. Friese-Greene's arrival was also described as coinciding with a release of 'wilfully diverse records' by Talk Talk, which drew on a range of musical genres. Hollis also described him as someone who understood the spirit of music and valued feeling over technical perfection.

Although Spirit of Eden and Laughing Stock represented a commercially risky departure from Talk Talk's earlier success, over time both albums were reassessed by critics and came to be regarded as influential works. The records were subsequently included in retrospective critics' 'Best Of' lists.

On the release of his solo album in 1998, Hollis also referenced the impact of Friese-Greene in an interview with Mojo magazine: '…with Tim [Friese-Greene] not being involved, this couldn’t be a Talk Talk album. It felt it would have been working on a name rather than on truth.'

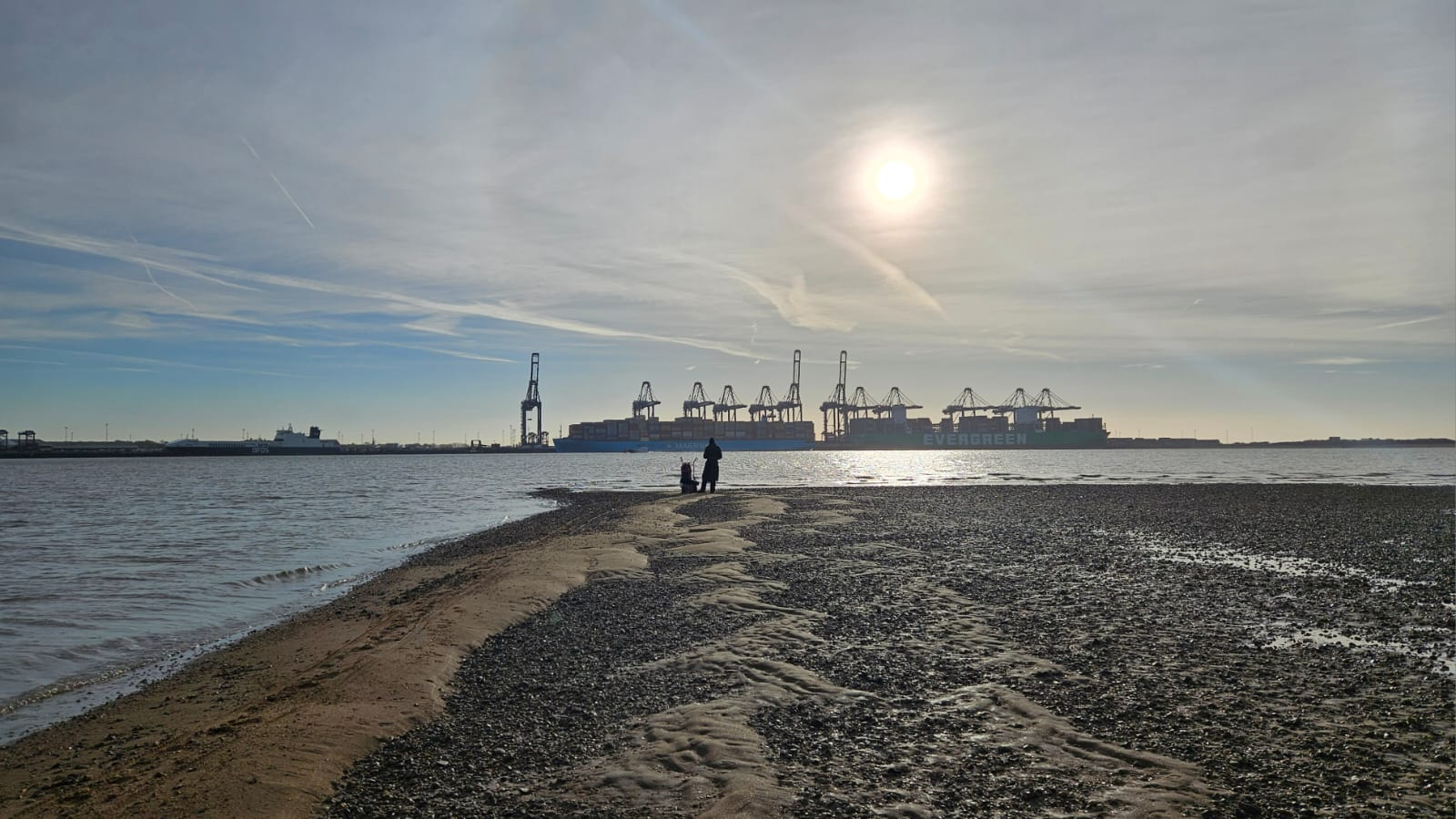
undocumented performances three

== Discography ==
Name	Involvement	Role	Year released
Queen - Sheer Heart Attack	Album	Tape Op	1974
Mandalaband - Mandalaband	Album	Engineer	1975
The Wombles - Superwombling	Album	Engineer	1975
Kursaal Flyers - Golden Mile	Album	Engineer	1976
The Rumour - Max	Album	Engineer	1977
Peter Straker - Changeling	Album	Engineer / Producer	1978
Mike Batt - Schizophonia	Album	Engineer	1977
Tycoon - Tycoon	Album	Engineer	1978
Hawklords - Hawklords 25 Years On	Album	Mix engineer	1978
The Boomtown Rats – A Tonic For The Troops	Album	Mix engineer	1978
The Zones - Under Influence	Album	Producer	1979
The Records - Shades in bed	Album tracks	Producer	1979
Graham Parker & the Rumour - Squeezing out sparks	Album	Engineer	1979
City Boy - The day the earth caught fire	Album	Engineer	1979
Art Garfunkel - Bright Eyes	Track	Engineer	1979
Touch - Touch	Album	Producer	1980
City Boy - Heads are rolling	Album	Producer	1980
Night - Long Distance	Album	Producer	1980
Dirty Looks - Dirty Looks	Album	Producer	1980
Quincy - Quincy	Album	Producer	1980
Praying Mantis - Time tells no lies	Album	Producer	1981
Ocean - Ocean	Album	Producer	1981
Jon English - Beating the Boards	Album	Producer	1981
Carrie Grant - To the beat	Track	Co-writer	1982
Stiff Little Fingers - £1.10 or less EP	EP	Producer	1982
Thomas Dolby - She Blinded Me With Science / One Of Our Submarines	Single	Engineer / Producer	1982
Tight Fit - Tight Fit	Album	Producer (album) / Co-writer (track)	1982
The Nolans - Dragonfly	Track	Producer / Writer	1982
CaVa CaVa - CaVa CaVa	Album	Producer	1983
Blue Zoo - 2 By 2	Album	Producer	1983
Talk Talk - It's My life	Album	Producer (album) / Co-writer (tracks)	1984
Talk Talk - Colour of Spring	Album	Co-writer / Producer	1986
Salvation Sunday - Cold Grey Eyes	Single	Producer	1986
Talk Talk - Spirit of Eden	Album	Co-writer / Producer	1988
Brian Kennedy - The Great War of Words	Album	Producer	1990
Lush - Sweetness and Light	EP	Producer	1990
Talk Talk - Laughing Stock	Album	Co-Writer / Producer	1991
Catherine Wheel - Ferment	Album	Co-Producer	1992
Sidi Bou Said - Broooch	Album	Producer	1993
Heligoland - Creosote & Tar	EP	Artist / Producer	1997
Heligoland - Heligoland	Album	Artist / Producer	2000
Catherine Wheel - Wishville	Album	Producer / Co-writer (tracks)	2000
Midnight Choir - Waiting for Bricks to Fall	Album	String arrangements on tracks	2003
Heligoland - Pitcher, Flask & Foxy Moxie	Album	Artist / Producer	2006
Tim Friese-Greene - 10 sketches for piano trio	Album	Artist / Producer	2009
Tim Friese-Greene - All I hear is Foley / Semantics got me caned (Runge Kutta Refix)	Single	Artist	2011
Tim Friese-Greene - One girl among many	EP	Artist / Producer	2014
Tim Friese-Greene - I would change none for you A/B	Single	Artist / Producer	2015
Firefly Burning - Skeleton Hill	Album	Producer	2015
Firefly Burning - Breathe Shallow	Album	Producer	2019
Short Haired Domestic - Short Haired Domestic	Album	Artist / Producer	2020
Tim Friese-Greene - Melodic Apoptosis	Album	Artist / Producer	2022
