= Life's What You Make It (Talk Talk song) =

- Original release

Single by Talk Talk

from the album The Colour of Spring
- B-side: "It's Getting Late in the Evening"
- Released: 18 November 1985 (EU); 6 January 1986 (UK)
- Recorded: 1985
- Studio: Battery, London; Videosonics
- Genre: New wave
- Length: 4:29
- Label: EMI; Parlophone
- Songwriters: Mark Hollis; Tim Friese-Greene
- Producer: Tim Friese-Greene

Talk Talk UK singles chronology
"Dum Dum Girl" (1984)	"Life's What You Make It" (1985)	"Living in Another World" (1986)

Music video
- "Life's What You Make It" on YouTube

"Life's What You Make It" is a song by English band Talk Talk, initially released in Germany on 18 November 1985 as the first single from the band's third studio album The Colour of Spring, before being released in the UK on 6 January 1986 and becoming a hit, peaking at No. 16, and charted in numerous other countries, often reaching the top 20. It appeared at No. 90 on the Billboard Hot 100 the weeks of February 15 and 22, 1986.

Artist James Marsh created the single's cover illustration. The track was re-released as a single in 1990, charting for a second time.

== Conception ==
The song was one of the last to be conceived for The Colour of Spring, following concern from the band's management at the lack of an obvious single among accumulated work. Initially unwilling, Mark Hollis and Tim Friese-Greene, the principal source of original material for the band, accepted the task as a challenge. Friese-Greene: "I had a drum pattern loosely inspired by Kate Bush's 'Running Up That Hill' and Mark was playing 'Green Onions' organ over the top." (Making No. 3 in the UK Singles Chart, "Running Up That Hill" had been released in August 1985). The track was embellished with David Rhodes' guitar hook.

== Personnel ==
Credits as per The Colour of Spring album notes.

=== Talk Talk ===
- Mark Hollis – lead vocal, piano
- Paul Webb – backing vocals
- Lee Harris – drums

=== Additional musicians ===
- Martin Ditcham – percussion
- Tim Friese-Greene – organ, Mellotron
- David Rhodes – guitar

== Track listings ==
1985/86 single

7" / 12"

1. "Life's What You Make It" – 4:25 (7") / (extended version) – 8:16 (12")
2. "It's Getting Late in the Evening" – 5:43

12" (double)

1. "Life's What You Make It" (extended version) – 8:16
2. "It's Getting Late in the Evening" – 5:43
3. "It's My Life" – 6:16
4. "Does Caroline Know?" – 4:33
5. "It's My Life" – 3:50

12"

1. "Life's What You Make It" (extended version) – 6:58
2. "Life's What You Make It" (early mix) – 6:39
3. "It's Getting Late in the Evening" – 5:43

12" (U.S.)

1. "Life's What You Make It" (extended mix) – 6:54
2. "It's Getting Late in the Evening" (7" version) – 5:44
3. "Life's What You Make It" (dub version) – 6:06

1990 single

7" / cassette

1. "Life's What You Make It" – 4:26
2. "Life's What You Make It" (live from Hammersmith Odeon) – 4:41

12"

1. "Life's What You Make It" (the BBG remix) – 6:14
2. "Life's What You Make It" – 4:26
3. "Tomorrow Started" (live from Hammersmith Odeon) – 7:45

CD

1. "Life's What You Make It" – 4:29
2. "Tomorrow Started" (live from Hammersmith Odeon) – 7:47
3. "Life's What You Make It" (live from Hammersmith Odeon) – 4:41

12"

1. "Life's What You Make It" (the Fluke remix) – 6:16
2. "Life's What You Make It" (the Dominic Woosey remix) – 8:21

== Charts ==
Chart (1985–1986)	Peak position
Australia (Kent Music Report)	70
Belgium (Ultratop 50 Flanders)	14
Canada Top Singles (RPM)	48
Europe (European Top 100 Singles)	10
France (SNEP)	49
Germany (GfK)	24
Ireland (IRMA)	17
Italy (Musica e dischi)	14
Netherlands (Dutch Top 40)	13
Netherlands (Single Top 100)	11
New Zealand (Recorded Music NZ)	11
Switzerland (Schweizer Hitparade)	17
UK Singles (Official Charts)	16
US Billboard Hot 100	90
US Billboard Hot Dance Club Play^{1}	22
US Billboard Hot Dance Music/Maxi-Singles Sales^{1}	40
US Billboard Top Rock Tracks	26
US Cash Box	88

Chart (1990)	Peak position
Europe (Eurochart Hot 100)	66
Ireland (IRMA)	23
UK Singles (Official Charts)	23

^{1}Remix

== Certifications ==
Region	Certification	Certified units/sales
United Kingdom (BPI)	Silver	200,000^{‡}
^{‡} Sales+streaming figures based on certification alone.

== Cover versions ==
The song is covered in 1994 by The Divine Comedy with a string quartet during the Promenade album sessions, and released in several occasions.

In 2009, "Life's What You Make It" was covered by Australian rock musician Rowland S. Howard for his final solo album Pop Crimes.

For the 2012 benefit tribute album Spirit of Talk Talk, "Life's What You Make It" was covered by singer-songwriter Duncan Sheik in a duet with Rachael Yamagata. In 2011 the Danish band Dúné recorded the song for the film ID:A.

More recently, a Placebo cover version of "Life's What You Make It" featured on both a double A-side (with "Jesus' Son") and the band's Life's What You Make It EP in 2016. American rock band Joywave covered the song for a Spotify Singles release for the music streaming service in 2018.

Seal performed a cover of "Life's What You Make It" in Philadelphia’s Unity Concert for America on 4th July 2026.
