= Mark Hollis =

English musician and singer-songwriter (1955–2019)

- Hollis in 1988

Background information
- Born: Mark David Hollis; 4 January 1955; Tottenham, England
- Died: February 2019 (aged 64) (Note: Hollis's date of death was reported as 18 February and 25 February 2019. His death was announced as early as 24 February 2019.) Heathfield, East Sussex, England
- Genres: New wave; synth-pop; art pop; post-rock; folk; jazz; ambient
- Occupations: Musician; singer; songwriter
- Instruments: Vocals; guitar; piano; keyboards
- Years active: 1977–1991; 1998; 2001; 2012
- Labels: EMI; Polydor
- Formerly of: Talk Talk
- Spouse: Felicity Costello

Mark David Hollis (4 January 1955 – February 2019) was an English musician, singer, and songwriter who was the co-founder, lead vocalist, lyricist, and songwriter of the new wave and post-rock band Talk Talk. Hollis achieved commercial success and critical acclaim in the 1980s and 1990s as a member of the band and wrote most of the songs, including hits like "It's My Life" and "Life's What You Make It". Primarily a vocalist, Hollis also played guitar and keyboards.

Beginning in 1981 as a synth-pop group with a New Romantic image, Talk Talk's sound became increasingly adventurous under Hollis's direction. For their third album, The Colour of Spring (1986), Talk Talk adopted an art pop sound that won critical and commercial favour and remains their biggest commercial success. The band's final two albums, Spirit of Eden (1988) and Laughing Stock (1991), were radical departures from their early work, taking influence from jazz, folk, and experimental music. Despite being commercial failures upon release, retrospective reviews of the albums were highly positive and they have come to be seen as early landmarks of post-rock music.

After Talk Talk disbanded in 1991, Hollis went on hiatus but returned in 1998 with his only solo album, which continued the direction of Talk Talk's sound but in a more minimal, sparse, acoustic style. Following the release of the album, Hollis retired from the recording industry to focus on his family. In February 2019, Hollis died from cancer at the age of 64.

== Biography ==
=== Early life (1955–1977) ===
Hollis was born on 4 January 1955 in Tottenham, London. He had two brothers, one elder and one younger. Little is known about his early life as Hollis was a reluctant interviewee throughout his career. In 1962, his family moved from London to Rayleigh, Essex. In 1966, Hollis started at Rayleigh's Sweyne Grammar School, now The Sweyne Park School. He left Sweyne after completing his O-levels in 1971. He attended Tollington grammar school (now Fortismere School), but dropped out of college without completing his A-levels, blaming the "complete lack of rules" there.

After studying part time whilst working in an industrial laboratory, he accepted a place at University of Sussex in 1975 to study child psychology, but dropped out in 1976 to pursue music. He worked at what he later described as a "succession of horrible jobs" whilst he began to write songs. Reflecting on this period in his life, he later said, "I could never wait to get home and start writing songs and lyrics. All day long I'd be jotting ideas down on bits of paper and just waiting for the moment when I could put it all down on tape."

=== The Reaction (1977–1979) ===
Mark's older brother, Ed, mentored him and introduced him to the music industry. Ed was a disc jockey, producer and manager of several bands, including the pub-rock group Eddie and the Hot Rods. With Ed's encouragement and assistance, Mark formed his first band, The Reaction. Emerging in the post-punk era, the Reaction's sound reflected Hollis's interest in early garage rock as found on the 1972 compilation Nuggets. In a later interview, Hollis said, "Up until punk, there's no way I could have imagined I could get a record deal because I didn't think I could play, but punk said, 'If you think you can play you can play.'"

In 1977, The Reaction recorded a demo for Island Records. A song from the demo, "Talk Talk Talk Talk", was included on the punk compilation Streets, released by the fledgling label Beggars Banquet. Written by Hollis, "Talk Talk Talk Talk" is an early version of Talk Talk's 1982 second single, "Talk Talk". George Gimarc noted the Reaction's rendition of the song is about twice as fast and has "a completely different feel" than the 1982 version. In 1978, Island released the Reaction's only single, "I Can't Resist". The Reaction disbanded in 1979.

Hollis owed much of his musical taste to Ed. He introduced Mark to a wide range of music from garage rock to modal jazz, particularly Miles Davis's collaborations with arranger Gil Evans on Porgy and Bess (1959) and Sketches of Spain (1960). Hollis later said Davis and Evans's work together "has space, tight arrangement and technique but it also has movement within it" and said those two albums "were extremely important albums to [him] then and they still are, because the values they work with are faultless".

=== Talk Talk ===
Hollis was best known for being the lead singer and primary songwriter of the band Talk Talk between 1981 and 1991. He was praised for his "always remarkable voice" and, along with Talk Talk's producer Tim Friese-Greene, took the lead in evolving the band's style from New Romantic into the more experimental and contemplative style that later became known as post-rock.

Hollis has been credited with saying: "Before you play two notes, learn how to play one note. And don't play one note unless you've got a reason to play it." He also commented: "The silence is above everything, and I would rather hear one note than I would two, and I would rather hear silence than I would one note." In 1982, he cited his greatest influences as Burt Bacharach and William Burroughs.

"The Colour of Spring"
Excerpt from "The Colour of Spring", the opening track from Hollis's solo album

=== Solo work and retirement ===
Talk Talk disbanded in 1991. In 1998, Hollis released a self-titled solo debut album, Mark Hollis. In an interview at the time, he said: "To me the ultimate ambition is to make music that doesn't have a use by date, that goes beyond your own time." He also said: "Technique has never been an important thing to me. Feeling always has been, and always will be, above technique."

According to a 2008 article in The Guardian, he then largely retired from making music. He stated about his decision to retire from performing, "I choose for my family. Maybe others are capable of doing it, but I can't go on tour and be a good dad at the same time." Despite Hollis's absence from the public eye, he continued to be mentioned in the music press as an example of an artist who refused to sacrifice his artistic ambition for commercial success, as a yardstick for current artists and one of the most important musicians of his generation. His withdrawal from the public continued to fascinate music critics. By the time his solo album was released, Hollis had moved back from the countryside to London in order to provide his two sons with a more cosmopolitan environment.

In 2004, Hollis resurfaced briefly to receive a Broadcast Music Inc. Award for having written "It's My Life". In 2012, a piece of specially commissioned music by Hollis titled "ARB Section 1", was used in the television series Boss.

=== Collaborations ===
Hollis performed the solo track "Piano" on the 1998 minimalist album AV 1, by Phill Brown and Dave Allinson, under the pseudonym John Cope. This was later included on the 2001 Talk Talk compilation album Missing Pieces. He played piano on and co-wrote the track "Chaos" on the 1998 trip hop album Psyence Fiction by Unkle, later asking for his name to be removed from the album credits. He co-produced and arranged two tracks ("The Gown" and "Big Mouth") on Anja Garbarek's 2001 album Smiling & Waving, and played bass guitar, piano and melodica.

== Personal life ==
From 1998 until 2017, Hollis lived in Wimbledon, London, with his wife Felicity ('Flick') Costello, a teacher and their two sons, before moving to Heathfield, East Sussex, where he lived until his death. Hollis's desire to spend more time with his family was a major reason that Talk Talk stopped touring after 1986 and his reason for retiring from the music industry in 1998.

== Death ==
Hollis died from cancer in February 2019, aged 64. Initial reports of his death included a tweet from his cousin-in-law, the paediatrician Anthony Costello, and a tribute by Talk Talk's bassist Paul Webb, before his former manager, Keith Aspden, confirmed Hollis's death to the media on 26 February.

== Discography ==
=== Solo album ===
- Mark Hollis (1998)
