= Portishead discography =

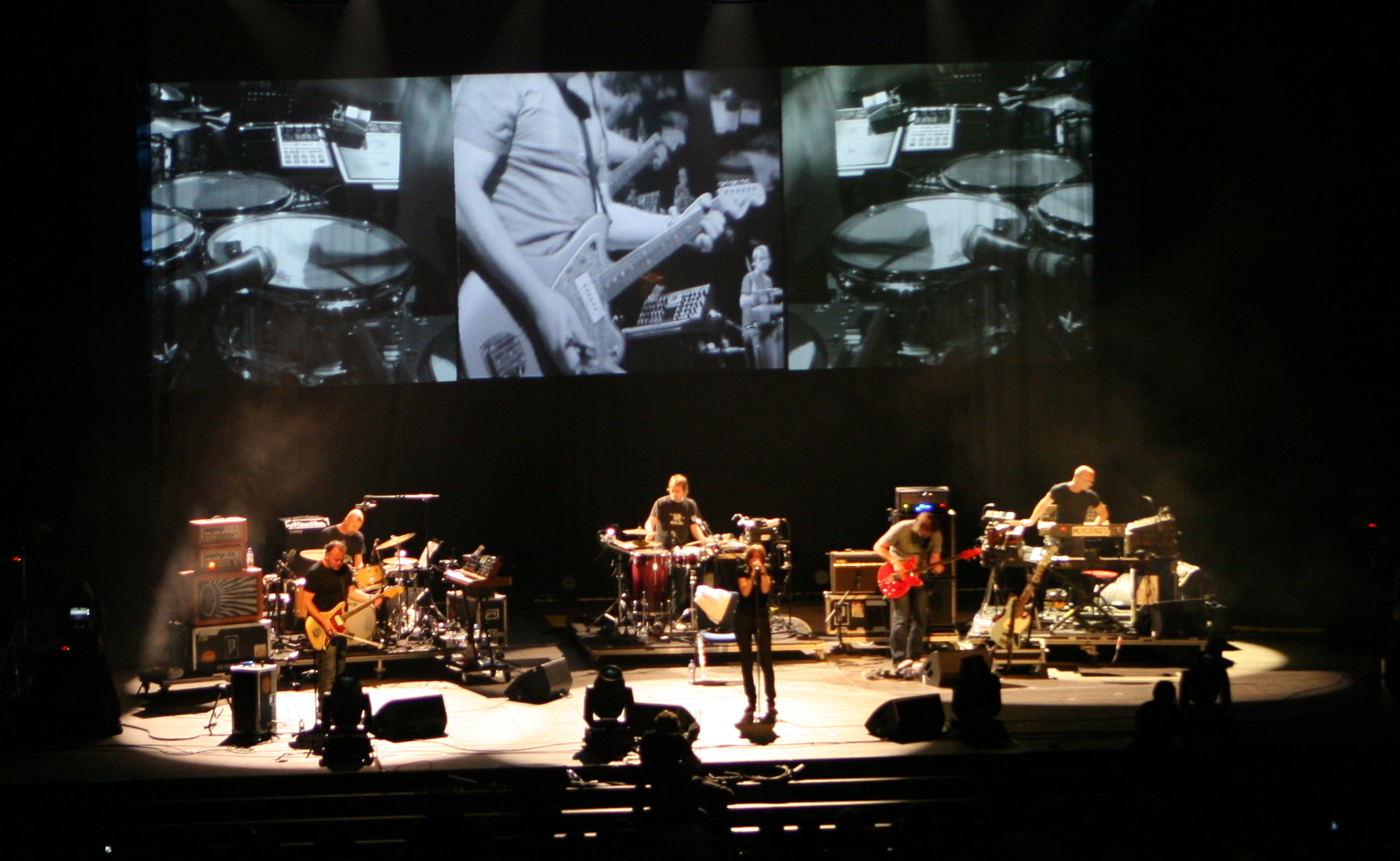
- Portishead performing in 2008
- Studio albums: 3
- Live albums: 1
- Compilation albums: 1
- Singles: 10
- Video albums: 1
- Music videos: 11
- Remixes: 20

The discography of British trip hop group Portishead consists of three studio albums, one live album, one compilation, ten singles and one video album. The Bristol-based band consists of Geoff Barrow, Beth Gibbons and Adrian Utley.

== Albums ==
=== Studio albums ===
List of albums, with selected chart positions and certifications
Title	Album details	Peak chart positions										Certifications
Title	Album details	UK	AUS	CAN	FRA	GER	NLD	NZ	NOR	SWI	US	Certifications
Dummy	Released: 22 August 1994; Label: Go! Discs (8285222); Formats: CD, LP	2	23	16	52	45	15	21	29	26	79	BPI: 3× Platinum; MC: Platinum; RIAA: Gold
Portishead	Released: 29 September 1997; Label: Go! Beat (8285222); Format: CD, LP	2	2	5	3	7	31	1	7	11	21	BPI: Platinum; ARIA: Gold; MC: Gold
Third	Released: 28 April 2008; Label: Island; Formats: CD, LP, digital download	2	9	3	3	6	8	9	6	2	7	BPI: Gold

=== Live albums ===
Title	Album details	Peak chart positions										Certifications
Title	Album details	UK	AUS	BEL (FL)	FRA	GER	NLD	NOR	NZ	SCO	US	Certifications
Roseland NYC Live	Released: 2 November 1998; Label: Go! Beat (5594242); Format: CD, LP	40	33	35	9	7	59	19	23	66	155	BPI: Silver

== Singles ==
Single	Year	Peak chart positions										Certifications	Album
Single	Year	UK	AUS	BEL (WA)	CAN	FRA	IRE	NLD	NZ	SCO	US	Certifications	Album
"Numb"	1994	—	—	—	—	—	—	—	—	—	—		Dummy
"Sour Times"	1994	13	66	—	29	—	—	— (Note: "Sour Times" did not enter the Netherlands' Single Top 100 but peaked on the Netherlands' Single Tip Chart at number five.)	—	13	53	BPI: Silver; RMNZ: Gold	Dummy
"Glory Box"	1994	13	96	36	—	12	12	25	—	17	—	BPI: Platinum; RMNZ: Platinum	Dummy
"All Mine"	1997	8	36	—	—	—	—	—	29	8	—		Portishead
"Over"	1997	25	159	—	—	—	—	—	—	29	—		Portishead
"Only You"	1998	35	131	—	—	—	—	—	37	40	—		Portishead
"Machine Gun"	2008	52	87	— (Note: "Machine Gun" did not enter the Wallonie Ultratop 50, but peaked at number 17 on the Ultratip chart.)	84	82	—	—	—	33	—		Third
"The Rip"	2008	—	—	—	—	98	—	—	—	—	—		Third
"Magic Doors"	2008	—	—	—	—	83	—	—	—	—	—		Third
"Chase the Tear"	2009	164	—	—	—	—	—	—	—	—	—		non-album singles
"SOS"	2016	—	—	—	—	—	—	—	—	—	—		non-album singles
"—" denotes singles that did not chart or were not released in that country.

== Compilations ==
- 1995 Glory Times (the "Glory Box" and "Sour Times" singles combined)
- 1995 The Rebirth of Cool Phive ("Revenge of the Number")

== Video albums ==
- 1998 Roseland NYC Live (PAL video)
- 2002 Roseland NYC Live (DVD; also includes all single promos and short films shown in the videography section)

== Collaborations and miscellaneous releases ==
- 1999: Portishead collaborated with Tom Jones on "Motherless Child" from his album of duets Reload. That album also has a cover of Portishead's "All Mine" sung as a duet with Neil Hannon from The Divine Comedy.
- 2003: Geoff Barrow along with Adrian Utley, Clive Deamer, Tim Saul and John Baggott assisted with the production of Stephanie McKay's McKay under the Go! Beat Records label.
- 2005: Geoff Barrow and Adrian Utley produced The Coral's The Invisible Invasion.
- 2006: Portishead recorded a cover of "Requiem for Anna" on the various artists compilation Monsieur Gainsbourg Revisited.
- Portishead Interview and Mix CD (Geoff Barrow interviewed by Mark Findlay (INTER HEAD 1) and Mix by Geoff Barrow & Andy Smith with Cowboys (MIX HEAD 1))
- A track entitled "Acid Jazz & Trip Hop (Remix)" has been circulating the web and Portishead, Massive Attack, or Squarepusher are widely credited as the artist. However, the track is in fact a Portishead remix of an Unkle song that has been given different titles on a number of releases. On Unkle's earliest release, The Time Has Come EP, the track is entitled "If You Find Earth Boring (Portishead Plays U.N.K.L.E Mix)". However, on various compilations and "The Time Has Come" 2005 single by DJ Shadow, the track is entitled "Time Has Come (Portishead Plays Unkle Mix)".

== Remixes ==
- Depeche Mode – "In Your Room" (The Jeep Rock Mix) (1993)
- Depeche Mode – "Walking in My Shoes" (Grungy Gonads Mix) (1993)
- Gabrielle – "Going Nowhere" (Portishead Mix) (1993)
- Whores of Babylon – "Fall of Agade" (Portishead Remix) (1993)
- Paul Weller – "Wild Wood" (The Sheared Wood Remix) (1994)
- Primal Scream – "Give Out but Don't Give Up" (Portishead Remix) (1994)
- Ride – "Moonlight Medicine" (Portishead's Ride On The Wire Mix) (1994)
- The Sabres of Paradise – "Planet D" (Portishead Remix) (1994)
- Gravediggaz – "Nowhere to Run, Nowhere To Hide" (Portishead Remix) (1994)
- The Federation – "Rusty James" (Portishead Remix) (1994)
- UNKLE – "The Time Has Come" (Portishead Plays Unkle Mix) (1994)
- Earthling – "1st Transmission" (Portishead's Earthead Mix) (1994)
- Earthling – "Nefisa" (Portishead Mix) (1995)
- Nine – "Whutcha Want?" (Portishead Mix) (1995)
- Massive Attack – "Karmacoma" (Portishead Experience) (1995)
- Junkwaffel – "Mudskipper" (Portishead So-So Mix) (1995)
- My Dying Bride - "Grace Unhearing" (Portishell Mix) (1998)
- Something for Kate – "Easy" (Mr Barrow and Mr Yates Surfin' For Kate Remix) (1999)
- Machine Gun Fellatio – "Horny Blonde 40" (Portishead Remix) (2002)

== Videography ==
=== Music videos ===
- "Sour Times" (Hemming): made up of scenes from To Kill a Dead Man
- "Numb" (dir. Alexander Hemming)
- "Glory Box" (Hemming) homage to the Basil Dearden film Victim
- "Wandering Star" (acoustic version)
- "All Mine" (Dick Caruthers) based on a 1968 Italian talent show and The Outer Limits
- "Over" (Chris Bran)
- "Humming" (Ben Waters) A short film noir set to the song of the same name (2003)
- "Only You" (Chris Cunningham)
- "Machine Gun" (John Minton)
- "Magic Doors" (John Minton)
- "The Rip" (Nick Uff)
- "We Carry On" (Nick Uff)
- "SOS" (Unknown director)
- "Roads" (Together For Palestine) (John Minton)

=== Short films ===
- To Kill a Dead Man (1994) (Alexander Hemming)

== Other use in media ==
=== Advertisements ===
- "Glory Box" appeared in a Levi's ad celebrating the watch pocket.
- "Numb" was used in a commercial for the TV series Lost and featured in a commercial for the Nissan Primera.
- "The Rip" was used in a TV commercial for the Gucci Bloom line of perfumes.
- "Roads" was used in TV advertisements for One Campaign as well as for the Alfa Romeo 159.
- "Machine Gun" was used in the Metro: Last Light teaser trailer.
- "Chase the Tear" was used in the promotional teaser for the reality series Utopia.

=== Films ===
- Nadja ("Strangers") ("Roads") (1994)
- Assassins ("Sour Times") (1995)
- Le Confessional ("Numb") (1995)
- Go Now ("Mysterons") (1995)
- Little Criminals ("Roads") (1995)
- Tank Girl ("Roads") (1995)
- The Craft ("Glory Box") (1996)
- Mars Attacks! ("Humming") (1996)
- Stealing Beauty ("Glory Box") (1996)
- When the Cat's Away ("Glory Box") (1996)
- Nowhere ("Mourning Air") (1997)
- B Monkey ("Glory Box") (1998)
- Cheaters ("Roads") (2000)
- The Watcher ("Roads") (2000)
- Sous le sable ("Undenied") (2000)
- Lord of War ("Glory Box") (2005)
- Sharkwater ("Roads") (2007)
- Jake Blauvelt: Naturally ("Roads") (2013)
- Wild ("Glory Box") (2014)
- High-Rise ("SOS" [cover]) (2015)

=== Television ===
- This Life ("Mysterons") – "When The Dope Comes In", ("It Could Be Sweet") - "The Plumber Always Rings Twice", ("Sour Times", "Roads") - "+10"
- The Vice ("Sour Times") theme song
- MTV Downtown ("Glory Box", "Sour Times") – "Insomnia", "Night Shift"
- Crossing Jordan ("Strangers") – "Born to Run"
- CSI: Crime Scene Investigation ("Glory Box") – "Chaos Theory", ("We Carry On") – "Leave Out All The Rest"
- The L Word ("Roads") – "Limb from Limb"
- Skins ("Undenied") "Maxxie and Anwar", ("Machine Gun") – "Effy"
- Rescue Me ("Numb") – "Zombies", ("Glory Box" ") – "Thaw"
- Warehouse 13 ("Only You") – "Elements", ("Sour Times") – "Time Will Tell"
- Numb3rs ("Glory Box") – "And the Winner Is..."
- Ringer ("Glory Box") – "If You Ever Want a French Lesson"
- Defiance ("Roads") – "The Cord and the Ax"
- Gotham ("Roads") – "Selina Kyle"
- Person of Interest ("Roads") – "Nautilus"
- The People v. O.J. Simpson: American Crime Story ("Sour Times") – "Marcia, Marcia, Marcia"
- American Horror Story: Apocalypse ("Glory Box") – "Could It Be. . . Satan?"
- Yellowjackets ("Glory Box") - "F Sharp"

=== Video games ===
- Grand Theft Auto V ("Numb"), track appears as PlayStation 4 and Xbox One exclusive track for fictional radio station WorldWide FM
