= Roseland NYC Live =

Live album by Portishead
- Released: 2 November 1998
- Recorded: 24 July 1997 (Note: Except "Sour Times" and "Roads"); 1 April 1998 (Note: "Sour Times"); 3 July 1998 (Note: "Roads")
- Venues: Roseland Ballroom, New York City; The Warfield, San Francisco; Quart Festival, Kristiansand, Norway
- Genres: Trip-hop; psychedelic rock; acid jazz
- Length: 57:25
- Label: Go! Beat
- Producers: Portishead; Erik Lloyd Walkoff

Portishead chronology
Portishead (1997)	Roseland NYC Live (1998)	Third (2008)

Professional ratings
Review scores
Source	Rating
AllMusic	3/5 stars
Entertainment Weekly	A−
Los Angeles Times	3/4 stars
Melody Maker	4/5 stars
NME	8/10
Pitchfork	7.6/10
Q	3/5 stars
Record Collector	5/5 stars
Rolling Stone	3.5/5 stars
Uncut	5/5 stars

Roseland NYC Live is a live album by English electronic music band Portishead. It was released on 2 November 1998 by Go! Beat. A PAL format VHS video was released the same year, with a DVD version following four years later. Although the New York Philharmonic is credited as appearing in the video, none of the musicians are members of the Philharmonic, nor is the Philharmonic credited in the audio album.

== Content ==
The album was engineered by Rik Simpson.

Unlike the CD, all the tracks on the DVD were recorded at the Roseland Ballroom. The DVD version has a bonus elements section, containing the music videos for "Numb", "Sour Times", "All Mine", "Over" and "Only You", as well as short films "Road Trip" and "Wandering Star" and the Portishead short film To Kill a Dead Man.

== Track listing ==
All tracks are written by Geoff Barrow, Beth Gibbons and Adrian Utley (except noted).

No.	Title	Writer(s)	Length
1.	"Humming"		6:28
2.	"Cowboys"	Barrow; Gibbons	5:03
3.	"All Mine"		4:02
4.	"Mysterons"		5:41
5.	"Only You"	Barrow; Gibbons; Utley; Ken Thorne; Tre Hardson; Derrick Stewart	5:22
6.	"Half Day Closing"	Barrow; Gibbons; Utley; Joseph Byrd	4:14
7.	"Over"		4:13
8.	"Glory Box"		5:37
9.	"Sour Times"	Barrow; Gibbons; Utley; Lalo Schifrin	5:21
10.	"Roads"		5:51
11.	"Strangers"	Barrow; Gibbons; Utley; Wayne Shorter	5:20

Video

1. "Humming"
2. "Cowboys" (Barrow, Gibbons)
3. "All Mine"
4. "Half Day Closing"
5. "Over"
6. "Only You"
7. "Seven Months"
8. "Numb"
9. "Undenied" (Barrow, Gibbons)
10. "Mysterons"
11. "Sour Times"
12. "Elysium"
13. "Glory Box"
14. "Roads"
15. "Strangers"
16. "Western Eyes"

== 25th anniversary reissue ==
In 2023, a newly remastered and expanded version was released. The additional tracks include "Undenied" and "Numb" from the concert film and the full-length performance of "Western Eyes", which was played in part over the credits of the film. "Sour Times" and "Roads" were changed to the actual Roseland Ballroom versions, since previously these were substituted on the 1998 album release with recordings from other live performances. The new remastered tracks became available digitally online in late 2023, while the CD and vinyl versions were released on 26 April 2024.

== Personnel ==
Credits adapted from the liner notes of Roseland NYC Live.

=== Portishead ===
- Adrian Utley – Moog (tracks 1, 6); guitar (all tracks but 1); musical direction, orchestral arrangements
- Beth Gibbons – vocals (all tracks)
- Dave McDonald – front of house
- Geoff Barrow – decks (all tracks but 6); drums (track 6); musical direction

=== Additional musicians ===
- John Baggott – keyboards (all tracks)
- Jim Barr – bass (all tracks)
- John Cornick – trombone (tracks 1, 3, 5, 11)
- Dave Ford – trumpet (tracks 1, 3, 11); flugelhorn (track 5)
- Will Gregory – oboe (track 1); baritone sax (tracks 3, 5, 11)
- Andy Hague – trumpet (tracks 1, 3, 11); flugelhorn (track 5)
- Ben Waghorn – alto flute (tracks 1, 5, 11); alto sax (tracks 3, 5, 11)
- Clive Deamer – drums (all tracks but 1 and 6); percussion (track 6)
- Andy Smith – decks (track 6)
- Nick Ingman – conducting (tracks 1–8, 11); orchestral arrangements
- New York Philharmonic – orchestra (tracks 1–8, 11)
  - Jeffry Carney, David Finck, John Miller – bass
  - Stephanie Cummins, Susie Katayama, Jesse Levy, Carol Paisner – cello
  - Alfred Brown, Harold Colette, Susan Follari, Olivia Koppell
  - Israel Chorberg, Richard Clark, Natalie Cummins, Katsuko Esaki, Joyce Hammann, Ashley Horne, Regis Iandiaro, Joanna Jenner, Byung Kwak, Carmel Malin, Joel Pitchon, Carol Pool, Pamela Porta, Anthony Posk, Lenard Rivlin, Andrew Stein, Belinda Whitney-Barratt – violin

=== Technical ===
- Portishead – production (all tracks but 9 and 10)
- Keith Grant – live audio engineering
- Ian Huffam – engineering (all tracks but 9 and 10)
- Rik Simpson – engineering
- John Thompson – backline technician
- Huw Williams – backline technician
- Andy Taylor – concert sound
- Jeff Hoffberger – concert sound
- Dave Hewitt – audio recording
- Sean McClintock – audio recording
- Phil Gitomer – audio recording
- Øystein Halvorsen – engineering (track 10)
- Erik Lloyd Walkoff – production (track 10)
- Paul Read – engineering assistance (tracks 9, 10)
- Geoff Barrow – production (tracks 9, 10)
- Adrian Utley – production (tracks 9, 10)
- John Neilson – engineering (track 9)

=== Artwork ===
- Sarah Sherley-Price – design

== Charts ==
1998 chart performance for Roseland NYC Live
Chart (1998)	Peak position
Australian Albums (ARIA)	33
Belgian Albums (Ultratop Flanders)	35
Canada Top Albums/CDs (RPM)	63
Dutch Albums (Album Top 100)	59
European Albums (Music & Media)	54
French Albums (SNEP)	9
German Albums (Offizielle Top 100)	58
New Zealand Albums (RMNZ)	23
Norwegian Albums (VG-lista)	19
Scottish Albums (Official Charts)	66
UK Albums (Official Charts)	40
US Billboard 200	155

2024–2026 chart performance for Roseland NYC Live
Chart (2024–2026)	Peak position
Austrian Albums (Ö3 Austria)	25
Belgian Albums (Ultratop Wallonia)	28
German Albums (Offizielle Top 100)	7
Greek Albums (IFPI)	66
Swiss Albums (Schweizer Hitparade)	15
