= Glory Times =

Compilation album by Portishead
- Released: 7 June 1995
- Recorded: 1994
- Genre: Trip hop
- Length: 46:49
- Language: English
- Label: Go! Discs; London
- Producer: Portishead; Adrian Utley

Portishead chronology
Dummy (1994)	Glory Times (1995)	Portishead (1997)

Professional ratings
Review scores
Source	Rating
AllMusic	2.5/5 stars

Glory Times is a 1995 compilation album by English band Portishead which contains mixes of songs from Dummy as well as the theme from their short film To Kill a Dead Man. The two included CDs are the same as the respective singles for "Sour Times" and "Glory Box". This release was only published in Canada.

== Track listing ==
Disc one

1. "Sour Sour Times" – 4:07
2. "Lot More" – 4:21
3. "Sheared Times" – 4:17
4. "Airbus Reconstruction" – 5:08
5. "Theme from To Kill a Dead Man" – 4:25

Disc two

1. "Glory Box" (edit) – 3:35
2. "Glory Box" (Mudflap Mix) – 5:28
3. "Scorn" – 6:04
4. "Sheared Box" – 3:30
5. "Toy Box" – 5:43
