= Third (Portishead album) =

2008 studio album

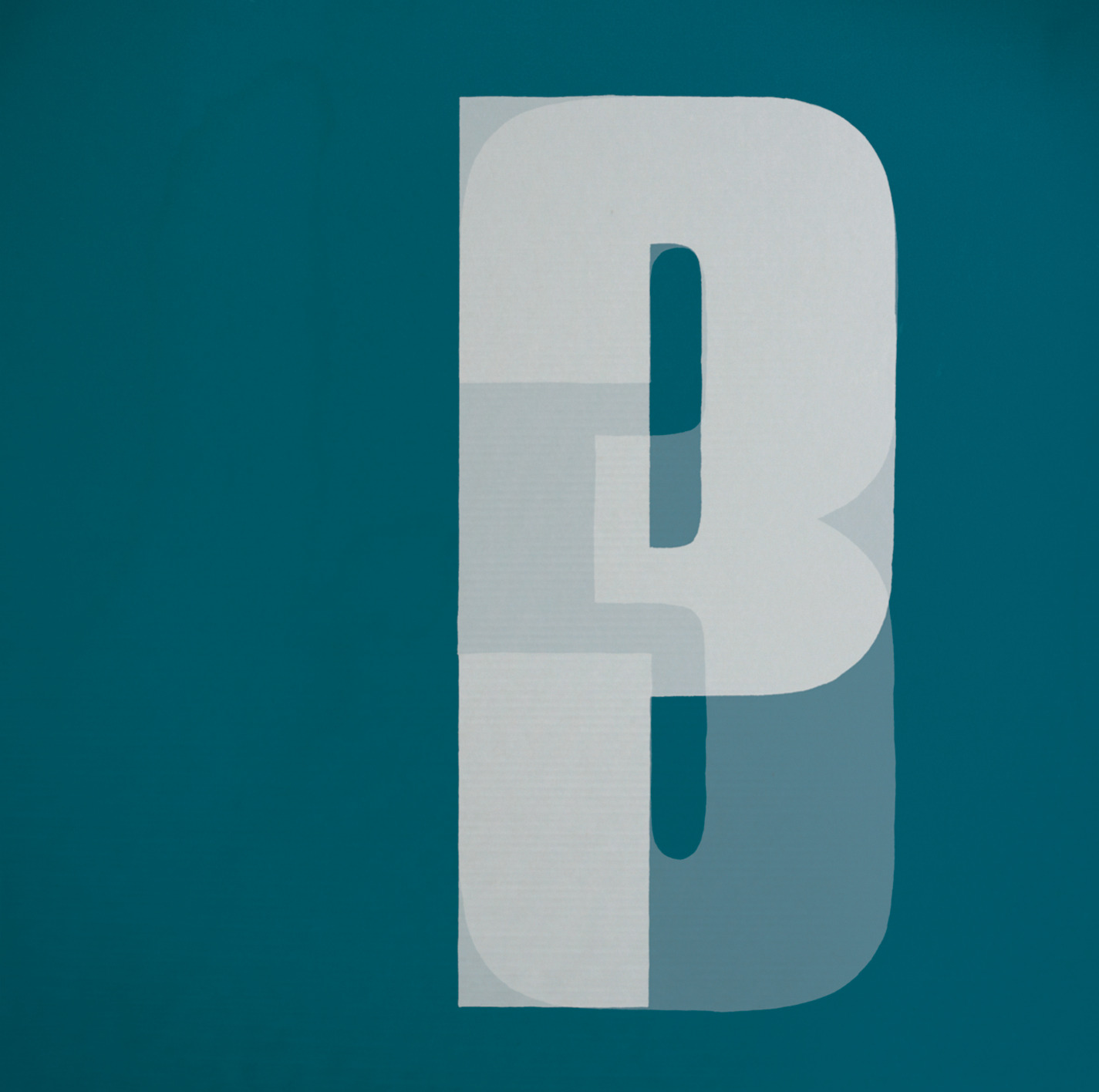

Studio album by Portishead
- Released: 28 April 2008
- Recorded: 2005–2008
- Genres: Experimental rock; electronica; psychedelic rock
- Length: 49:17
- Labels: Island; Mercury
- Producer: Portishead

Portishead chronology
Roseland NYC Live (1998)	Third (2008)

Singles from Third
- 1. "Machine Gun" Released: 24 March 2008; 2. "The Rip" Released: 9 June 2008; 3. "Magic Doors" Released: 24 November 2008

Third is the third studio album by the English band Portishead. It was released on 28 April 2008 in the UK by Island Records and a day later in the US by Mercury Records. Portishead's first studio album in eleven years, Third moved away from their earlier trip hop style, incorporating influences such as krautrock and the film soundtracks of John Carpenter.

After Portishead released their self-titled second album in 1997, the songwriter and drummer, Geoff Barrow, put Portishead on hiatus and moved to Australia. He became uninterested in music, and efforts to develop new songs with the guitarist and keyboardist Adrian Utley failed. They were inspired to create again after producing the Coral, and restarted work with the singer, Beth Gibbons, in Bristol, England.

Third entered the top ten of several national charts and was certified gold in the UK. It was named one of the best albums of 2008 by several publications; in 2013, NME ranked it number 330 in its list of the 500 Greatest Albums of All Time.

== Background ==
In 1998, following three years of tours and a divorce, the drummer and songwriter Geoff Barrow put Portishead on hiatus and went to Australia. He told Drowned in Sound: "I couldn't find anything I liked musically in anybody, in anything." The guitarist and keyboardist Adrian Utley joined him to work on new material, but they were not satisfied with the results.

In 2003, Barrow wrote "Magic Doors", which he described as "an opening ... then we ended up going back and forth, hating everything and then liking everything, and we had to decide whether to carry on". Barrow and Utley produced the Coral's fourth album, The Invisible Invasion (2005), which proved inspiring. Barrow said: "Here's me and Ade, these older dudes, too scared to even play a note because we were scared we'd hate it, and there’s them, just being able to write a soundtrack in an afternoon."

== Recording ==
Portishead produced Third in their Bristol studios. Many of the songs existed for years as sketches, with the members exchanging recordings and adding ideas. By 2006, Portishead had prepared six or seven tracks. Barrow said that most of the record was written during a short period of productivity at the end of 2007.

Wanting to move away from their earlier trip hop sound, Portishead avoided using instruments they had used before. Barrow said "the basic thing was to sound like ourselves, not to repeat ourselves". The members experimented with swapping roles; Barrow played bass, and the singer Beth Gibbons played guitar on "Threads". Utley said that Portishead were looking for "limited playing" and that technique was no longer important to him after pursuing virtuosity for years.

For the first track, "Silence", Barrow initially sampled a record that had a spoken-word Portuguese introduction. Inspired by a Wiccan theory about the number three, Portishead wrote a "manifesto", had it translated into Portuguese, then recreated the sample with the new words to introduce the album. They did not synchronise the guitar's delay effect with the tempo, creating harsh, asynchronous echoes.

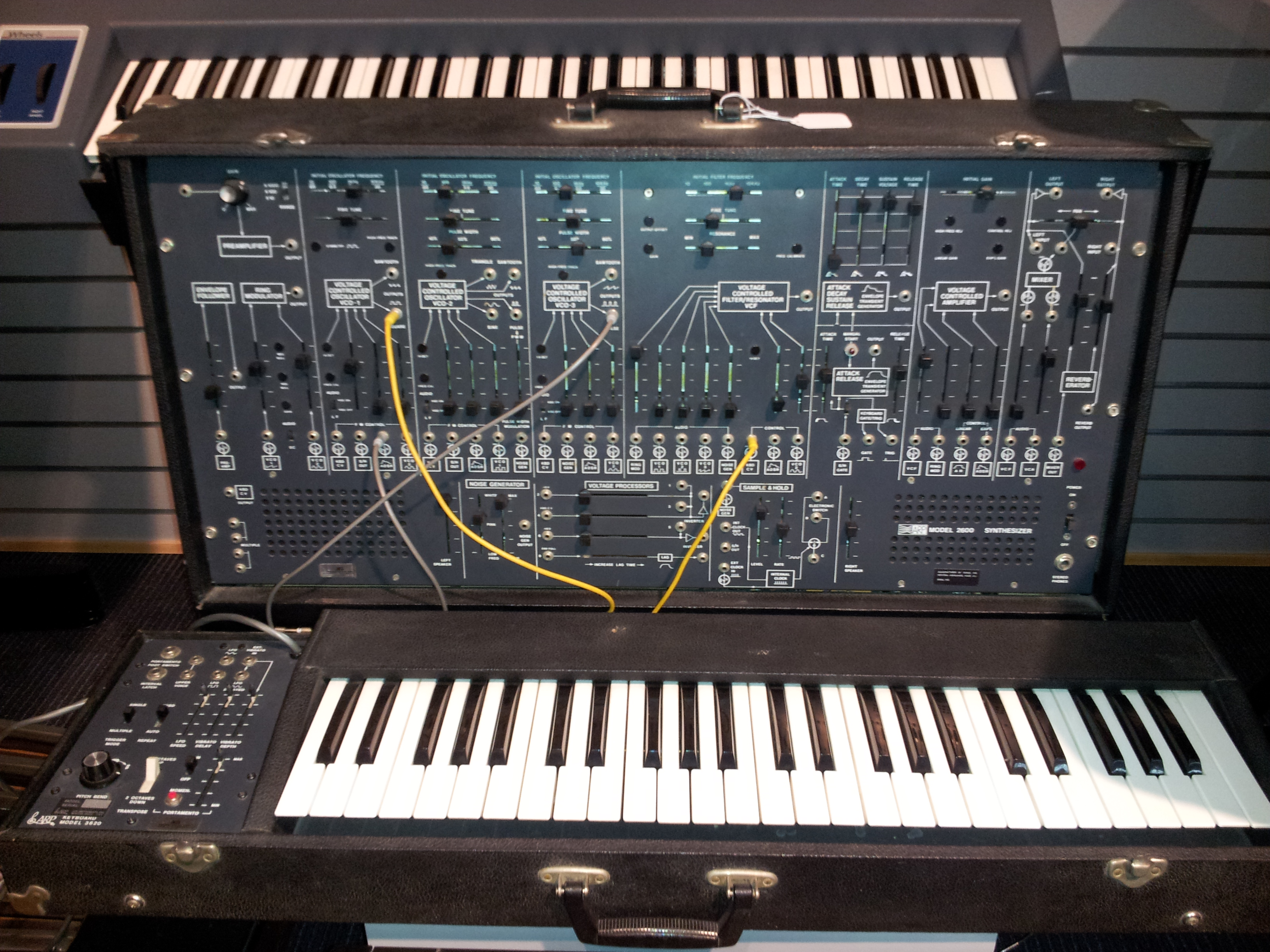
Portishead used analogue synthesisers, including the ARP 2600.

Portishead used analogue synthesisers, including a Minimoog, Korg MS-20, ARP 2600, Siel Orchestra and EMS VCS 3, and a clavioline – an electronic keyboard that predates the synthesiser. For "Threads", they used the "evil" detuned sound of the VCS 3 to create a foreboding horn-like sound, inspired by the English progressive rock band Hawkwind. The Siel Orchestra's sequencer was not sophisticated enough to play the arpeggios in "The Rip", so the band recorded the notes individually and edited them into an arpeggio pattern. The track also features a toy acoustic guitar Utley found in a junk shop.

"Deep Water" was inspired by Steve Martin's performance of "Tonight You Belong to Me" in the 1979 film The Jerk. Utley was initially unimpressed with Barrow's concept and said: "Geoff said he wanted to put these backing vocals on it, and I said I was having nothing to do with it. We didn't argue, I just conceded on that. But now I really quite like it, and the funny thing is Geoff is moving the other way on it."

To create the rhythm on "Machine Gun", Portishead sampled the drum machine in an old electronic organ. The synthesiser outro was inspired by the film soundtracks of John Carpenter. For "Magic Doors", the band added hurdy-gurdy and saxophone played by Will Gregory of Goldfrapp. According to Utley, "We made [Gregory] be a free jazz player that day ... We told him just to go fucking mad, to freak the fuck out. He had to move out of the room, so we couldn't see him, so he'd feel less inhibited."

== Music ==
Third contains elements of electronica, experimental rock, post-punk, psychedelic rock and surf rock. It departs from Portishead's trip hop sound, the genre they had popularised with their albums Dummy (1994) and Portishead (1997). It also contains no turntable scratching, a hallmark of their earlier albums. Gareth Grundy of Q wrote that the only connection to Portishead's prior records was Gibbons's voice. The AV Club wrote that Gibbons "sounds more hollowed-out and harrowed than ever, a human nervous twitch on too much coffee and too little sleep". Instead, Third contains "muscular" synthesisers, drum breaks and abrupt endings, with "propulsive" krautrock rhythms, break beats, cathedral organ and "Moroccan drones". The Guardian described it as "rockier" and "haunted by the angry post-punk of Joy Division and Siouxsie and the Banshees".

The opening track, "Silence", has a "propulsive" drum loop and "Morse code"-like guitar. "We Carry On" has a "claustrophobic" two-note electro riff; Rolling Stone likened it to the work of the American psychedelic band Silver Apples. "Deep Water" is a "ukulele doo-wop". "Machine Gun" is driven by a "mechanical" rhythm and synthesisers, which Drowned in Sound likened to the soundtracks of the 1980s films The Terminator and Blade Runner. "Magic Doors" features "huge" piano chords, "tick-tocking" cowbell and "corrupted" brass.

== Release and promotion ==
On 8 and 9 December 2007, Portishead curated the All Tomorrow's Parties festival in Minehead, England, and performed their first full sets in nearly 10 years, including tracks from Third. On 21 January 2008, Portishead announced a European tour, with a headline spot at the Coachella Valley Music and Arts Festival on 26 April.

Third was released on 28 April 2008 on Island Records in the UK, 29 April on Mercury Records in the US and 30 April on Universal Music Japan in Japan. It entered the UK Albums Chart at number two and the US Billboard 200 at number seven, becoming Portishead's highest US chart debut, selling 53,000 copies. On 21 April, a week before its release, Third was made available as a free stream on Last.fm, attracting 327,000 listeners in 24 hours. It was the first time Last.fm made an album available before its release. Third was the fifth-bestselling vinyl record of 2008, selling 12,300 copies.

== Reception ==
Professional ratings
Aggregate scores
Source	Rating
Metacritic	85/100
Review scores
Source	Rating
AllMusic	4.5/5 stars
The A.V. Club	A−
Entertainment Weekly	B+
The Guardian	5/5 stars
Los Angeles Times	3.5/4 stars
NME	9/10
Pitchfork	8.8/10
Rolling Stone	3.5/5 stars
Spin	4.5/5 stars
The Times	4/5 stars

At Metacritic, which assigns a weighted average score out of 100 to reviews and ratings from mainstream critics, Third has a score of 85 based on 38 reviews, indicating "universal acclaim".

In his review for AllMusic, Stephen Thomas Erlewine said that Third was "genuinely, startlingly original" and "utterly riveting and endlessly absorbing". The A.V. Club's Michaelangelo Matos wrote that "nearly every track provides some little sonic goody midway through as a reward for continued attention after all these years. For once, it's worth the effort." In Drowned in Sound, Nick Southall wrote that "several individual songs drift by almost unnoticed at first, contributing little more than a sense of unease to the collective memory of the album; an impression of oppression. Those numbers that do stand out, though, drag the record close to magnificence." John Payne of the Los Angeles Times wrote: "Though several doses of this languid, tension-filled music get a tad draining, taken altogether it is a suitable sound for our troubling times, and there's an invigorating mysteriousness. Its blaring electronic peals are a wake-up call." The Guardian reviewer Jude Rogers found that Third was "initially more a record to admire than to love", but that its "majesty unfurls" on repeats listens.

Louis Pattison of NME wrote that Third was "adventurous, sometimes dauntingly so – but seldom anything less than compelling" and said that it was Portishead's best album. PopMatters' Alan Ranta wrote that it would eventually be seen on par with Portishead's earlier work. Pitchfork's Nate Patrin named Third the week's "best new music", writing that it was "a staggering transformation and a return to form that was never lost, an ideal adaptation by a group that many people didn't know they needed to hear again". In Rolling Stone, Rob Sheffield wrote that Third was unexpected and "totally impressive". Mike Bruno of Entertainment Weekly said that it was less accessible than Portishead's earlier music, but "no less gorgeous". Gareth Grundy of Q gave it three out of five and was disappointed that Portishead had changed their sound, writing: "Third will probably be more admired than listened to ... Dummy was a challenging record that just happened to find an audience. Third merely turns up the black until the darkness is overwhelming."

Third was named the best album of 2008 by PopMatters, second best by Pitchfork, ninth by the Guardian, and 25th by NME. It was included in the 2014 edition of 1001 Albums You Must Hear Before You Die. In 2019, the Guardian named it the 45th-best album of the 21st century. The American webzine Somewhere Cold ranked Third No. 7 on their 2008 Somewhere Cold Awards Hall of Fame. In 2013, NME named it number 330 in its list of the 500 Greatest Albums of All Time.

== Track listing ==
All tracks are written by Geoff Barrow, Beth Gibbons and Adrian Utley except where noted.

Third track listing
No.	Title	Writer(s)	Length
1.	"Silence"		4:58
2.	"Hunter"		3:57
3.	"Nylon Smile"		3:16
4.	"The Rip"		4:29
5.	"Plastic"		3:27
6.	"We Carry On"		6:27
7.	"Deep Water"		1:31
8.	"Machine Gun"	Barrow; Gibbons	4:43
9.	"Small"		6:45
10.	"Magic Doors"	Barrow; Gibbons; John Baggott	3:32
11.	"Threads"		5:45

== Personnel ==
- Beth Gibbons – vocals, keyboards, electric guitar on "Threads"
- Geoff Barrow – drums, keyboards, synthesiser, bass guitar, percussion, programming
- Adrian Utley – electric guitar, acoustic guitar, bass guitar, ukulele, keyboards, synthesiser, programming
- Charlotte Nicholls – cello on "Silence" and "Threads"
- Claudio Campos – spoken intro on "Silence"
- Wendy Bertram – bassoon on "The Rip"
- Team Brick – clarinet on "Plastic," vocals on "Deep Water"
- David Poore & Ben Salisbury (the Somerfield Workers Choir) – vocals on "Deep Water"
- Will Gregory – saxophone on "Magic Doors" and "Threads"
- John Baggott – Rhodes piano on "Magic Doors"
- Stu Barker – hurdy-gurdy on "Magic Doors"
- Clive Deamer – drums on "Threads"
- Jim Barr – bass guitar on "Threads"

=== Production ===
- Producer – Portishead
- Recording engineers – Adrian Utley, Stuart Matthews, Rik Dowding, John Pickford
- Mix engineers – Geoff Barrow, Craig Silvey
- Art design – Marc Bessant
- Photography – Larry Bennett

== Charts ==
=== Weekly charts ===
Weekly chart performance for Third
Chart (2008)	Peak position
Australian Albums (ARIA)	9
Australian Dance Albums (ARIA)	2
Austrian Albums (Ö3 Austria)	4
Belgian Albums (Ultratop Flanders)	3
Belgian Albums (Ultratop Wallonia)	6
Canadian Albums (Billboard)	3
Czech Albums (ČNS IFPI)	8
Danish Albums (Hitlisten)	2
Dutch Albums (Album Top 100)	8
European Albums (Billboard)	3
Finnish Albums (Suomen virallinen lista)	9
French Albums (SNEP)	3
German Albums (Offizielle Top 100)	6
Irish Albums (IRMA)	4
Italian Albums (FIMI)	8
Japanese Albums (Oricon)	28
Mexican Albums (Top 100 Mexico)	76
New Zealand Albums (RMNZ)	9
Norwegian Albums (VG-lista)	6
Polish Albums (ZPAV)	4
Portuguese Albums (AFP)	5
Scottish Albums (Official Charts)	2
Spanish Albums (Promusicae)	16
Swedish Albums (Sverigetopplistan)	18
Swiss Albums (Schweizer Hitparade)	2
UK Albums (Official Charts)	2
UK Dance Albums (Official Charts)	1
US Billboard 200	7
US Top Alternative Albums (Billboard)	1
US Top Rock Albums (Billboard)	2

=== Year-end charts ===
Year-end chart performance for Third
Chart (2008)	Position
Australian Dance Albums (ARIA)	25
Belgian Albums (Ultratop Flanders)	46
European Albums (Billboard)	69
French Albums (SNEP)	87
Greek International Albums (IFPI)	15
Swiss Albums (Schweizer Hitparade)	63
UK Albums (OCC)	155

== Certifications ==
Certifications for Third
Region	Certification	Certified units/sales
United Kingdom (BPI)	Gold	100,000^{^}
^{^} Shipments figures based on certification alone.

== Release history ==
Third has been released in various formats.

Release dates and formats for Third
Region	Date	Label	Format	Catalog
United Kingdom	28 April 2008	Island	LP	1764104
United Kingdom	28 April 2008	Island	LP box set	1766390
United Kingdom	28 April 2008	Island	CD	1764013
United States	29 April 2008	Mercury/Go!	LP	B0011141-01
United States	29 April 2008	Mercury/Go!	CD	B0011141-02
Japan	30 April 2008	Universal Music Japan	CD	UICI-1069
