= Magic Doors =

Single by Portishead

from the album Third
- Released: 24 November 2008
- Recorded: 2005–2008
- Genre: Art rock
- Length: 3:32 (Album version); 3:22 (Single edit)
- Label: Island
- Songwriter(s): Geoff Barrow, Beth Gibbons, John Baggott
- Producer(s): Portishead

Portishead singles chronology
"The Rip" (2008)	"Magic Doors" (2008)	"Chase the Tear" (2009)

Music video
- Magic Doors on YouTube

"Magic Doors" is the third single from English trip hop band Portishead's third studio album, Third. It was released on 24 November 2008 through Island Records. The music video for the song is an artistic film by longtime collaborator John Minton.

== Live performances ==
Portishead performed the song live on current TV, which is featured as a UK digital download bonus track from their third studio album Third in April 2008.

== Track listing ==
=== 12" ===
1. "Magic Doors" – 3:32

=== Digital Download ===
The videos for "Silence", "Threads" and "Mysterons" were recorded during Portishead's performance at the 2008 Coachella Valley Music and Arts Festival.

1. "Magic Doors" (Single Edit) – 3:22
2. "Silence" (video) – 4:23
3. "Threads" (video) – 5:48
4. "Mysterons" (video) – 5:35

== Charts ==
Chart (2009)	Peak position
France (SNEP)	83
