= Numb (Portishead song) =

1994 single by Portishead

Single by Portishead

from the album Dummy
- Released: 13 June 1994
- Genre: Trip hop
- Length: 3:58
- Label: Go! Discs
- Songwriter: Portishead
- Producer: Portishead

Portishead singles chronology
"Numb" (1994)	"Sour Times" (1994)

Music video
- "Numb" on YouTube

"Numb" is a song by English trip hop group Portishead, released on 13 June 1994 by Go! Discs as the lead single from the band's debut album, Dummy (1994). It was both written and produced by the group. NME magazine ranked the song number 43 on their list of the "Best Albums and Tracks of 1994".

== Release ==
The single was released on 13 June 1994 in the United Kingdom and on 17 October 1994 in Australia. It did not chart in Europe, reaching the top 300 only in Australia at number 213.

== Critical reception ==
Andrew Smith from Melody Maker wrote, "Eerie, slow-burning and cinematic: the spiritual love child of Billie Holiday and Jazzie B. Scary stuff. The rumours about Portishead are obviously true." Another Melody Maker editor, Sarah Kestle, named it Single of the Week, adding, "The film of the record should be made in black and white. Grainy black and white. And it will be genius. Pure genius." Pan-European magazine Music & Media said, "Not to be confused with U2's number, although they share the love for cinema. Will their short film To Kill a Dead Man bear as much suspense as this song in a Fever spirit?" They added, "Toying with pop, jazz, cinema and dance—or all at once on 'Numb'—Portishead is the edelweiss among the weed." Andy Beevers from Music Week's RM Dance Update named it "a gem of a debut with its moody spaced-out beats and haunting melancholy female vocal." Dele Fadele from NME viewed it as a "oddly compelling debut that goes as far out on a limb as some of their more celebrated scene-mates." Jonathan Bernstein from Spin described it as a "creepy" track.

== Track listings ==
All tracks are remixes of "Numb" except "A Tribute to Monk & Canatella", which is a seven-minute instrumental track followed by 14 seconds of silence and yet another remix of "Numb".

- UK CD and 12-inch single, Australian CD single
1. "Numb" – 3:57
2. "Numb (Numbed in Moscow)" – 3:56
3. "Numb (Revenge of the Number)" – 3:23
4. "Numb" (Earth - Linger) – 4:14
5. "A Tribute to Monk & Canatella" – 11:01
- European CD single
1. "Numb" – 3:55
2. "Sour Times" (live) – 5:52
3. "Wandering Star" (live) – 4:48
4. "Interlude" (live) – 2:26

== Personnel ==
Portishead

- Beth Gibbons – vocals
- Geoff Barrow – programming, drums
- Adrian Utley – bass guitar

Additional musicians

- Clive Deamer – drums
- Gary Baldwin – Hammond organ

== Charts ==
Chart (1994)	Peak position
Australia (ARIA)	213
UK Club Chart (Music Week)	88
