= Earthling (band) =

English trip hop band

- Origin: Bristol, England
- Genres: Trip hop
- Years active: 1990s–late 1990s, 2008–present
- Members: Mau (rapper); Tim Saul (producer)
- Past members: Andy Keep (multi-instrumentalist)
- Website: earthling.bandcamp.com

Earthling is an English trip hop band from Bristol, England.

== Members ==
- Mau, rapper
- Tim Saul, producer

== Contributor ==
- Andy Keep, multi-instrumentalist

== Work ==
The group produced two albums before splitting: 1995's Radar (with scratching, on three tracks, by Portishead's Geoff Barrow) and 1997's Human Dust (unreleased until 2004). The group had moderate success, appearing on Later... with Jools Holland and being remixed by Portishead. They had a number 1 single in Israel. Radar has been described by Popmatters as still standing "as a respectable complement and contrast to Dummy, Maxinquaye, and Protection".

== Now ==
Saul now makes music for documentaries and adverts. Mau became a member of the band Dirty Beatniks, and later appeared on two Télépopmusik albums under the pseudonym Soda-Pop. Keep teaches at Bath Spa University.

Saul and Mau reformed Earthling in 2008, and in January 2011 released the album Insomniac's Ball on Bandcamp: "We came back to rid ourselves of the insomnia, the nausea, the past and the cold journey to the end of every day and night."

== Discography ==
=== Albums ===
- Radar (1995) (Cooltempo) - UK No. 66
- Humandust (1997/2004) (Discograph)
- Insomniac's Ball (2011)

=== Singles ===
- "First Transmission" (1995) (Cooltempo)
- "Echo on My Mind Part II" (1995) (Cooltempo) - UK No. 61
- "Nefisa" (1995) (Cooltempo)
- "Blood Music" (EP) (1996) (Cooltempo) - UK No. 69
- "Saturated" (2004) (Discograph)
- "Gri Gri (Agents of Desire Remix)" (2011)
- "Lab Baby" (2011)
