= To Kill a Dead Man =

- Movie poster
- Directed by: Alexander Hemming
- Written by: Geoff Barrow; Beth Gibbons; Adrian Utley
- Produced by: Lizzie Ross
- Starring: Geoff Barrow; Tim Bishop; Beth Gibbons; Dave McDonald; Richard Newell; Adrian Utley
- Cinematography: Alexander Hemming
- Edited by: Tim Thorton-Allan
- Music by: Portishead
- Release date: 1994
- Running time: 11 minutes
- Country: United Kingdom
- Language: English

To Kill a Dead Man is a short film made in 1994 by the trip hop group Portishead. The film is a spy movie which revolves around an assassination and its aftermath.

The film is featured in the bonus section on the DVD version of Roseland NYC Live released in 2002. The theme can be found on both the 1995 compilation album Glory Times and the 1994 CD single "Sour Times". The music video for "Sour Times" also uses footage from the film.

A still from the film is featured on the cover of their album Dummy and several other stills appear in the CD booklet. A miniature image of the poster for the film is visible in the upper left corner at the back of this album.
