= All Mine (Portishead song) =

Single by Portishead

from the album Portishead
- B-side: "Cowboys"
- Released: 8 September 1997
- Recorded: 1996–1997
- Genre: Trip hop; jazz fusion; soul
- Length: 4:00
- Label: Go! Discs; London
- Songwriters: Geoff Barrow; Beth Gibbons; Adrian Utley
- Producers: Portishead; Dave McDonald

Portishead singles chronology
"Glory Box" (1994)	"All Mine" (1997)	"Over" (1997)

Music video
- "All Mine" on YouTube

"All Mine" is the second track and first single from English electronic music band Portishead's self-titled second album (1997). The song is written by Geoff Barrow, Beth Gibbons and Adrian Utley, and produced by the band with Dave McDonald. It was released as a single in September 1997 by Go! Discs and London Records, along with "Cowboys", "Only You" and "Over". The accompanying music video—inspired by a late 1960s Italian music show and The Outer Limits—featured a little girl singing in front of an orchestra. The single reached No. 8 in the United Kingdom and is so far the band's only top 10 hit there. It was also covered on Tom Jones's 1999 album Reload.

== Critical reception ==
AllMusic editor Stephen Thomas Erlewine described the song as a "impeccable modern-day torch song" and "horn-punctuated". Upon the release, Larry Flick from Billboard magazine wrote that it shows Portishead "in a typically melancholy mood", and noted that singer Beth Gibbons "has perfected her Shirley Bassey vocal inflections, while partner Geoff Barrow builds a richly textured groove that compresses snakey guitars and ominous horn fills into a dark trip-hop groove." He added that it is "nourishment for the adventurous at heart, but accessible to the mainstream at the same time." The Daily Vault's Sean McCarthy noted its "elaborate orchestral setup, a jarring mix of strings and horns [that] drive the chorus." He also stated that conductor Nick Ingman "deserves major props for adding, but not overpowering Portishead's intoxicating gloom."

Jason Rugg from The Ithacan named it a highlight of the album, describing it as a "soul-influenced" track, "which swings with wan-wan guitar and a tight horn section". British magazine Music Week gave it a score of four out of five, adding, "Even edgier, and more obviously produced, the lead single for the long-awaited second album amply restates the band's strengths but may not break through into pop markets." Elisabeth Vincentelli from Rolling Stone wrote that "All Mine" "may begin like a hiccuping James Bond theme, but it turns out to be a tale of coolly detached possessiveness: There's nowhere to hide from me…./All mine, you have to be." Sal Cinquemani from Slant noted that it, "which first appears to be a "happy" love song, descends into a possessive declaration: From that cloud, number nine/Danger starts the sharp incline." A reviewer from Sunday Mirror praised it as "excellent". Dave Tompkins for Vibe said it's "soul controlling with horn blows and stalking snares."

== Chart performance ==
The song peaked at number eight in its first week on the UK Singles Chart on September 14, 1997. It was also a top 10 hit in Scotland, reaching number eight there too. Additionally, "All Mine" peaked at number 30 in Iceland and number 44 in Sweden and Switzerland. On the Eurochart Hot 100, the song reached its best position at number 22 on September 27. Outside Europe, it peaked at number 29 in New Zealand and number 36 in Australia.

== Music video ==
The accompanying music video for "All Mine" is shot in black-and-white. It depicts a young girl at some kind of TV-show, performing the song accompanied (but without actually playing any instrument, suggesting it's all in playback) by an orchestra in front of a camera. The video has a vintage feel, and has Italian subtitles reading "Ci scusiamo per la povera qualità del suono" ("We are sorry for the poor quality of the sound"). It has been claimed to be inspired by a late 1960s Italian music show and The Outer Limits. A picture from the music video is used on the cover of the album. The Golden Apples commented on the video, "Possibly one of the most hauntological videos produced way back in 1997. Adding to its hauntology is the grainy look of any HD clip you can find and a nightmare inducing strange superimposed image around 3:40 – 3:48 …what the…".

== Track listing ==
1. "All Mine" (Barrow, Gibbons, Utley) − 3:59
2. "Cowboys" (Barrow, Gibbons) − 4:38
3. "Cowboys (Instrumental)" (Barrow, Gibbons) − 4:38

== Personnel ==
- Beth Gibbons – vocals, production
- Adrian Utley – guitar, bass, horn arrangements, production
- Geoff Barrow – turntables, programming, samples, production
- Andy Hague, Ben Waghorn, John Cornick – horns
- Dave McDonald – production
- Nick Ingman – horn arrangements

== Charts ==
Chart (1997)	Peak position
Australia (ARIA)	36
Europe (Eurochart Hot 100)	22
Iceland (Íslenski Listinn Topp 40)	30
New Zealand (RIANZ)	29
Scotland (OCC)	8
Sweden (Sverigetopplistan)	44
Switzerland (Schweizer Hitparade)	42
UK Singles (OCC)	8
