= The Rip (song) =

Single by Portishead

from the album Third
- Released: 9 June 2008
- Recorded: 2005–2008
- Genre: Folktronica; krautrock
- Length: 4:29
- Label: Island; Mercury
- Songwriters: Geoff Barrow; Beth Gibbons; Adrian Utley
- Producer: Portishead

Portishead singles chronology
"Machine Gun" (2008)	"The Rip" (2008)	"Magic Doors" (2008)

"The Rip" is a song by English band Portishead. It was released on 9 June 2008 as the second single from their third studio album, Third (2008). It was written by Geoff Barrow, Beth Gibbons, and Adrian Utley of the band. It is a folk ballad that smoothly transitions into being electronic halfway through. Critics acclaimed the song, which received an animated music video by Nick Uff and peaked at number 98 in France.

== Composition ==
The guitarist and keyboardist Adrian Utley recalled that "The Rip" first started out as a minimal guitar-and-voice folk song, but the band had "so many ideas [and] things that evolved [...] and then [were] discarded" that led up to the final version. The Siel Orchestra's sequencer the band used was not sophisticated enough to play the arpeggios in "The Rip", so they recorded the notes individually and edited them into an arpeggio pattern. The track also features a toy acoustic guitar Utley found in a junk shop.

The song has two sections: it begins as a slow acoustic track with a guitar and theremin. It later transitions through an artificially sustained note by the vocalist Beth Gibbons' voice into being electronic with what Sal Cinquemani of Slant describes as a "cyclic synth-bass loop". Some reviewers compared the track's sound to that of the electronic music duo Goldfrapp. Reviewers offered imaginative descriptions of the latter section, with one stating that it exists in "the enchanted realm of early Kraftwerk", and another saying that it feels like being in "little fluffy clouds" over a "sci-fi landscape". Michaelangelo Matos of The A.V. Club said that the song's "rubber-band keyboards and tick-tocking drums" reminded him of "mid-period Stereolab". "The Rip" is also a ballad, with lyrics describing "wild white horses taking [Gibbons] away".

== Critical reception and legacy ==
Garrett Kamps of The Village Voice called the song "so good it may have been worth waiting 10 years for", with Jim Windolf of Vanity Fair thinking of it upon first listen as a "new classic" comparable to "Stairway to Heaven" or "You Are My Sunshine". Stereogum writer Ryan Leas retrospectively felt that "The Rip" could be Portishead's best song, describing the track as the band's most "affecting and gorgeous". Pitchfork ranked it as the 199th-best song of the 2000s; contributor Matthew Solarski opined that "nobody can spread multi-syllabic words of woe across bars of music quite like Beth Gibbons".

The animated music video for the song made by Nick Uff was first broadcast on 12 May 2008, on the band's website. The English musician Thom Yorke played the song live as a part of Radiohead later that same year and with Portishead in 2015 at Latitude Festival. On Third's release, Yorke called "The Rip" his favorite song on Portishead's "best record". The song has also been used in an advertisement campaign for the Gucci Bloom line of perfume.

== Track listing ==
1. "The Rip" – 4:30
2. "Silence" (Portishead live on Current TV) (EU digital download bonus track; Japan iTunes Store bonus track) – 4:37
3. "The Rip" (EU and Japan iTunes Store bonus video) – 4:10

== Charts ==
Chart (2008)	Peak position
France (SNEP)	98
