= Machine Gun (Portishead song) =

Single by Portishead

from the album Third
- Released: 24 March 2008
- Recorded: 2005–2008
- Genre: Electro-industrial
- Length: 4:45
- Label: Island; Mercury
- Songwriters: Geoff Barrow; Beth Gibbons
- Producer: Portishead

Portishead singles chronology
"Only You" (1998)	"Machine Gun" (2008)	"The Rip" (2008)

"Machine Gun" is a song by English band Portishead. The song made its radio and download debut on 24 March 2008, acting as the lead single from their third studio album, Third (2008). It premiered on Zane Lowe's BBC Radio 1 show and was made available for download on the band's official website. A UK one-sided 12 inch vinyl was released on 14 April 2008.

== Release ==
The 12-inch vinyl was released on 14 April, while a digital version was made available from the official site on 10 April. A music video for the song was released. It features the band playing the song at the studio.

On 29 May, at the Primavera Sound festival in Barcelona, Chuck D of Public Enemy joined the band onstage to perform a rap section on the instrumental part at the end of the song.

== Sample usages ==
The song's beat was sampled by The Weeknd on his song "Belong to the World" from his debut album Kiss Land. According to Geoff Barrow, the sample was used without the band's permission. The song's beat was also sampled in “Field Trip” by American hip hop supergroup ¥$, composed of rapper Kanye West and singer Ty Dolla Sign; Barrow once again stated that the sample was used without permission.

== Track listing ==
1. "Machine Gun" – 4:45

== Charts ==
"Machine Gun" entered the UK Singles Chart at number 52 on 30 March 2008, their first singles chart entry for ten years since "Only You" in March 1998.

Chart (2008)	Peak position
Australia (ARIA)	87
Belgium (Ultratip Flanders)	12
Belgium (Ultratip Wallonia)	17
Canada Hot 100 (Billboard)	84
France (SNEP)	82
UK Singles Chart (Official Charts Company)	52
UK Dance (Official Charts)	1
