= Over (Portishead song) =

Single by Portishead

from the album Portishead
- A-side: "Over"
- Released: 10 November, 1997
- Recorded: 1996–1997
- Length: 4:00
- Label: Go! Discs; London
- Songwriters: Geoff Barrow; Beth Gibbons; Adrian Utley
- Producers: Portishead; Dave McDonald

Portishead singles chronology
"All Mine" (1997)	"Over" (1997)	"Only You" (1998)

"Over" is the second single from English electronic music band Portishead's self-titled second album (1997). It peaked at number 25 on the UK Singles Chart and has been used in numerous TV shows and movies. The promotional black-and-white music video directed by Chris Bran featured lead singer Beth Gibbons singing to the camera in the middle of the darkness and occasionally running from one spotlight to another.

== Critical reception ==
British magazine Music Week gave the song three out of five, adding, "Typical of the mood of the parent album, this second spin-off single finds the quartet in very dark emotional waters, though still featuring all the classic Portishead sonic cues. Further listening reaps rewards."

== Track list ==
- Original British CD
1. "Over"
2. "Over Remix"
3. "Over Instrumental"
- British CD "Over 2"
1. "Over"
2. "Half Day Closing" (NYC)
3. "Humming" (NYC)

== Personnel ==
- Beth Gibbons – vocals, production
- Adrian Utley – guitar, bass, production
- Geoff Barrow – drums, samples, turntables, programming, production
- Dave McDonald – production

== Charts ==
Chart (1997)	Peak position
Australia (ARIA)	159
UK Singles (OCC)	25

== Cover versions and samples ==
- Ecuadorian electronic duo The Bunnies included a live version of the song in their 2016 eponymous EP.
- Musician Steve Adey covered the song on his 2017 LP Do Me a Kindness.
- The track was sampled by RZA on the track "Kiss of a Black Widow".
