= Portishead (album) =

1997 studio album by Portishead

Studio album by Portishead
- Released: 29 September 1997
- Recorded: 4 September 1995 ("Mourning Air"); 1996–1997
- Studios: State of Art (Bristol); Ridge Farm (Capel); Moles (Bath)
- Genres: Trip hop; acid jazz
- Length: 50:30
- Labels: Go!; London
- Producers: Portishead; Dave McDonald

Portishead chronology
Glory Times (1995)	Portishead (1997)	Roseland NYC Live (1998)

Singles from Portishead
- 1. "All Mine" Released: 8 September 1997; 2. "Over" Released: 10 November 1997; 3. "Only You" Released: 2 March 1998

Portishead is the second studio album by the English electronic music group Portishead, released on 29 September 1997 by Go! Discs.

== Music ==
With Portishead, the band chose to avoid sampling other records, which had been a defining feature of their debut album Dummy. Instead, they created original pieces which they wove into the songs, resulting in a more textured sound. The only song to employ samples was "Only You", which incorporates elements of Ken Thorne's Inspector Clouseau score and The Pharcyde's "She Said". "Western Eyes" is listed as sampling "Hookers & Gin" by the Sean Atkins Experience in the album's liner notes. In reality, this song does not exist; like most of the samples on the album, it was created by the band.

== Artwork ==
The album cover is a still image from the music video of the song "All Mine".

== Release ==
Released in September 1997, the album reached No. 2 on the UK Albums Chart and No. 21 on the Billboard 200.

On 3 December 2008, Universal Music Japan re-released Dummy and Portishead as a limited SHM-CD version.

== Reception ==
Professional ratings
Review scores
Source	Rating
AllMusic	4.5/5 stars
Entertainment Weekly	A
The Guardian	5/5 stars
Los Angeles Times	4/4 stars
NME	8/10
Pitchfork	8.2/10
Q	5/5 stars
Rolling Stone	3/5 stars
Spin	9/10
The Village Voice	B−

Portishead received critical acclaim upon its release. In a rave review for Q, Andrew Harrison said that the album showed Portishead sounding "less and less like a conflation of influences, and more and more like themselves", finding the music "almost cinematic" and the lyrics "more rounded" in perspective than on Dummy. Caroline Sullivan of The Guardian credited the band for rendering their debut album's sound "even more haunting" on Portishead. Commenting on the textures of the music, Barry Walters wrote in Spin that the group had created a "gothic", "deadly" and "trippy" atmosphere and gotten "darker, deeper, and more disturbing." AllMusic's Stephen Thomas Erlewine stated that while "on the surface, Portishead isn't all that dissimilar from Dummy", the "darker and more adventurous" quality of the music becomes apparent over repeated listens, adding that "the sonics ... would make it an impressive follow-up, but what seals its success is the remarkable songwriting."

=== Year-end lists ===
Publication	Accolade	Year	Rank
Melody Maker	Albums of the Year	1997	18
NME	1997 Critics' Poll	1997	32
Q	50 Best Albums of 1997	1997	(*)
Spin	Top 20 Albums of the Year	1997	6
The Village Voice	1997 Pazz & Jop Critics' Poll	1997	14

(*) designates unordered lists.

== Track listing ==
All tracks are written by Geoff Barrow, Beth Gibbons and Adrian Utley, except where noted.

No.	Title	Writer(s)	Length
1.	"Cowboys"	Barrow; Gibbons	4:38
2.	"All Mine"		3:59
3.	"Undenied"	Barrow; Gibbons	4:18
4.	"Half Day Closing"		3:49
5.	"Over"		4:00
6.	"Humming"		6:02
7.	"Mourning Air"		4:11
8.	"Seven Months"		4:15
9.	"Only You"	Barrow; Gibbons; Utley; Ken Thorne; Trevant Hardson; Derrick Stewart	4:59
10.	"Elysium"		5:54
11.	"Western Eyes"		3:57
Total length:			50:30

== Personnel ==
All personnel credits for Portishead are adapted from the album's liner notes.

Portishead

- Geoff Barrow – turntables, programming, samples; drums (tracks 4, 5, 9); production
- Beth Gibbons – vocals; production
- Adrian Utley – guitar (tracks 1, 2, 4, 5, 7–10); bass (tracks 2, 4, 5, 7, 9), Moog synthesiser (tracks 4, 6); Rhodes piano (track 9); piano (track 11); string & horn arrangements; production
- Dave McDonald – production, engineering

Additional musicians

- Clive Deamer – drums (tracks 1, 6, 7, 11), additional drums (track 3)
- Shaun Atkins – additional vocals (tracks 1, 11)
- John Baggot – organ (track 9), piano (track 10)
- Andy Hague – horns (track 2)
- John Cornick – horns (track 2), trombone (track 7)
- Ben Waghorn – horns (track 2)
- S. Cooper – violin (track 4)
- Nick Ingman – string & horn arrangements, orchestration, conducting

== Charts ==
=== Weekly charts ===
Weekly chart performance for Portishead
Chart (1997)	Peak position
Australian Albums (ARIA)	2
Austrian Albums (Ö3 Austria)	6
Belgian Albums (Ultratop Flanders)	9
Belgian Albums (Ultratop Wallonia)	23
Canadian Albums (Billboard)	5
Danish Albums (Hitlisten)	6
Dutch Albums (Album Top 100)	31
European Albums (Music & Media)	4
Finnish Albums (Suomen virallinen lista)	14
French Albums (SNEP)	3
German Albums (Offizielle Top 100)	7
Greek Albums (IFPI)	5
Irish Albums (IFPI)	3
New Zealand Albums (RMNZ)	1
Norwegian Albums (VG-lista)	7
Portuguese Albums (AFP)	7
Scottish Albums (Official Charts)	3
Swedish Albums (Sverigetopplistan)	6
Swiss Albums (Schweizer Hitparade)	11
UK Albums (Official Charts)	2
US Billboard 200	21

=== Year-end charts ===
1997 year-end chart performance for Portishead
Chart (1997)	Position
European Albums (Music & Media)	45
New Zealand Albums (RMNZ)	43
UK Albums (OCC)	69

1998 year-end chart performance for Portishead
Chart (1998)	Position
New Zealand Albums (RMNZ)	32

== Certifications and sales ==
Certifications and sales for Portishead
Region	Certification	Certified units/sales
Australia (ARIA)	Gold	35,000^{^}
Belgium (BRMA)	Gold	25,000^{*}
Canada (Music Canada)	Gold	50,000^{^}
New Zealand (RMNZ)	Platinum	15,000^{^}
Switzerland (IFPI Switzerland)	Gold	25,000^{^}
United Kingdom (BPI)	Platinum	300,000^{^}
United States	—	635,000
Summaries
Europe (IFPI)	Platinum	1,000,000^{*}
^{*} Sales figures based on certification alone.^{^} Shipments figures based on certification alone.
