= Glory Box =

1994 single by Portishead

Single by Portishead

from the album Dummy
- B-side: "Toy Box"; "Scorn"; "Sheared Box"
- Released: 26 September 1994
- Genre: Trip hop
- Length: 5:06
- Label: Go! Beat
- Songwriters: Portishead; Isaac Hayes
- Producers: Portishead; Adrian Utley

Portishead singles chronology
"Sour Times" (1994)	"Glory Box" (1994)	"All Mine" (1997)

Music video
- "Glory Box" on YouTube

"Glory Box" is a song by the English electronic band Portishead, released by Go! Beat as the third and final single from their debut album, Dummy (1994). It is built on a sample of "Ike's Rap II" by Isaac Hayes and was produced by the band with Adrian Utley. It peaked at number 13 on the UK Singles Chart, the band's first top-20 hit in the UK, and reached the top 10 in Iceland and the top 20 in France and Ireland. The music video was directed by Alexander Hemming.

== Background and release ==
"Glory Box" was released as a single on 26 September 1994, against the band's wishes. Geoff Barrow later told Pitchfork, "We had a row with the record company because we didn't want to release it because it felt too commercial", adding, "We lost the argument really. But we bought houses!"

== Composition and lyrics ==
The song's main theme is a sample of Hayes's 1971 recording "Ike's Rap II", taken from a copy of the record that had been warped by the sun. Utley plays a guitar line that Paste described as "Hendrix-tinted", with Barrow using the whammy bar to bend it increasingly out of tune towards the end of the track.

The lyrics are sung from the perspective of a woman frustrated with love and ready to give up on her relationship; the title, a term for a hope chest, does not appear in them. According to Smooth Radio, the song's plea to be treated fairly was misread by some listeners as a call for a return to traditional gender roles. Beth Gibbons was frustrated by such readings, telling The Independent in 1994 that "half the reason you write them is that you're feeling misunderstood and frustrated with life in general". In the same interview, she said that success could leave an artist lonelier than before, because "you've turned the whole thing into a product". Writer RJ Wheaton notes that Gibbons described the song as being about women being taken for granted.

== Critical reception ==
In his weekly UK chart commentary, James Masterton said that "Glory Box" "is definitely one of the more gloriously slinky indie records released in ages". A reviewer from Music & Media commented: "Put the violin of the late Papa John Creach on top of it, and you get the Jefferson Airplane for the '90s. Based on a sample from Isaac Hayes's Isaac Moods it's 'suspense dance'." Maria Jimenez from the magazine's Short Grooves column wrote: "This bluesy, emotional and hypnotic number is set to a very mellow, minimalistic and spacious hip hop musical backdrop. Potent vocals reminiscent of Cowboy Junkies and intense guitar energy and dub bass amplify the power of 'Glory Box.'"

Andy Beevers from Music Week gave it a score of four out of five, describing it as "another highly original and atmospheric song that is probably too downbeat and leftfield for daytime radioplay, but will still sell well". In a separate review, Music Week named it one of the "stand-out" tracks from the album and "one of the high spots of 1994". Andy Richardson from NME felt that it "makes your heart beat even slower and it's got a good groove." David Sinclair from The Times wrote, "This is a strange, shimmering affair, which mixes a scratchy hip-hop rhythm track, descending bass line (a la Python Lee Jackson's 'In a Broken Dream'), wailing blues guitar and the icily seductive vocals of Beth Gibbons into a highly addictive concoction."

== Music video ==
The music video for "Glory Box" was directed by Alexander Hemming, who had previously directed the video for "Sour Times", and produced by Lizzie Ross for Fat Fish Films. It was released on 14 November 1994. Set in the 1950s, it shows Gibbons performing as a jazz singer at a club, watched by office workers who attend as couples and between whom sexual tension builds. Apart from the band, the entire cast appears in drag.

== Legacy ==
Slant Magazine ranked the song number 21 on its 2011 list of "The 100 Best Singles of the 1990s", praising Gibbons's lyrics and vocal performance and calling it "a post-feminist anthem from the hungry, seedy depths of lust".

== Track listings ==
- UK CD and 12-inch single; Australian CD single
1. "Glory Box" (edit)
2. "Toy Box"
3. "Scorn"
4. "Sheared Box"
- UK cassette single and European CD single
1. "Glory Box" (edit)
2. "Toy Box"
- US 12-inch single

A1. "Glory Box" – 5:06
A2. "Scorn" – 6:04
A3. "Sheared Box" – 3:30
B1. "Strangers" – 3:55
B2. "Wandering Star" – 4:51

== Personnel ==
Portishead

- Beth Gibbons – vocals
- Geoff Barrow – programming
- Adrian Utley – guitar, Hammond organ

Samples

- Isaac Hayes – sample of "Ike's Rap II"

== Charts ==
=== Weekly charts ===
Chart (1994–1995)	Peak position
Australia (ARIA)	96
Belgium (Ultratop 50 Wallonia)	36
Canada Rock/Alternative (RPM)	10
Europe (Eurochart Hot 100)	41
Europe (European Hit Radio)	27
France (SNEP)	12
Iceland (Íslenski Listinn Topp 40)	7
Ireland (IRMA)	12
Israel (Israeli Singles Chart)	29
Netherlands (Dutch Top 40)	31
Netherlands (Single Top 100)	25
Scottish Singles Sales (Official Charts)	17
UK Singles (Official Charts)	13
UK Club Chart (Music Week) Charted as "Glory Box (mixes)"	97
US Alternative Top 50 (Radio & Records)	49

=== Year-end charts ===
Chart (1995)	Position
Iceland (Íslenski Listinn Topp 40)	57

== Certifications ==
Region	Certification	Certified units/sales
New Zealand (RMNZ)	Platinum	30,000^{‡}
United Kingdom (BPI)	Platinum	600,000^{‡}
^{‡} Sales+streaming figures based on certification alone.

== Release history ==
Region	Date	Format(s)	Label(s)	Ref.
United Kingdom	26 September 1994	12-inch vinyl; CD; cassette	Go! Beat	
United States	3 April 1995	Alternative radio	Go! Discs; London	
Australia	24 April 1995	CD; cassette	Go! Beat; Polydor	
