= Only You (Portishead song) =

Single by Portishead

from the album Portishead
- Released: 2 March 1998
- Recorded: 1996–1997
- Genre: Trip hop; alternative hip hop
- Length: 4:59
- Label: Go! Discs; London
- Songwriters: Geoff Barrow; Beth Gibbons; Adrian Utley; Ken Thorne; Trevant Hardson; Derrick Stewart
- Producers: Portishead; Dave McDonald

Portishead singles chronology
"Over" (1997)	"Only You" (1998)	"Machine Gun" (2008)

"Only You" is a single by English band Portishead, released in 1998 by Go! Discs and London Records as the third single from the band's self-titled second album (1997). The song was later released in a promotional French language lyrics version. Portishead performed the song on American television variety show Saturday Night Live on January 17, 1998.

The song samples "She Said" by The Pharcyde. Pharcyde members Slimkid3 and Fatlip received writer credits.

== Critical reception ==
British magazine Music Week gave "Only You" three out of five, writing, "Beth Gibbons's vocals are in typically gothic form on this smoky single, accompanied by Geoff Barrow's looping bassline and hip hop scratching."

== Music video ==
The music video to "Only You" was directed by Chris Cunningham, who has also worked with Aphex Twin, Björk, and Placebo. It involved Beth Gibbons floating in air, and a young boy. The people were shot in a tank of water and then digitally inserted into an alleyway of a street scene.

== Track listing ==
1. "Only You" (Edit)
2. "Elysium" (Parlour Talk Remix)
3. "Only You" (NYC)
4. "Only You"

== Personnel ==
- Beth Gibbons – vocals, production
- Adrian Utley – guitar, bass, Rhodes, production
- Geoff Barrow – drums, turntables, samples, programming, production
- John Baggot – organ
- Dave McDonald – production

== Charts ==
Chart (1998)	Peak position
Australia (ARIA)	131
New Zealand (RMNZ)	37
UK Singles (OCC)	35
