= Sour Times =

1994 single by Portishead

Single by Portishead

from the album Dummy
- Released: 1 August 1994
- Genre: Trip hop; alternative rock
- Length: 4:14
- Label: Go! Discs; London
- Songwriters: Geoff Barrow; Beth Gibbons; Adrian Utley
- Producers: Portishead; Adrian Utley

Portishead singles chronology
"Numb" (1994)	"Sour Times" (1994)	"Glory Box" (1994)

Music video
- "Sour Times" on YouTube

"Sour Times" is a song by English trip hop group Portishead, from their debut album, Dummy (1994). It was written by all three members of the band and released as a single by Go! Beat Records in August 1994, accompanied by three bonus tracks: "It's a Fire", "Pedestal", and "Theme from To Kill a Dead Man". It is also the band's only song to date to appear on the US Billboard Hot 100 chart, at number 53, becoming their biggest US hit. Its accompanying music video was directed by Alexander Hemming. NME and Spin ranked "Sour Times" number 32 and two in their lists of the 50 best songs of 1994 and 20 best singles of 1995. In 2011, Slant Magazine ranked it number 77 in their "The 100 Best Singles of the 1990s".

== Composition ==
The song uses a sample from Argentine composer Lalo Schifrin's "Danube Incident" from the 1967 album More Mission: Impossible. Portishead sped up the sample to a desired tempo which took Schifrin's arrangement up nearly a semitone, giving the song a dissonant kind of "hip-hop tuning".

== Release ==
"Sour Times" was released as the second single from Dummy on 1 August 1994. It initially reached only number 57 in the UK Singles Chart, but after the success of "Glory Box" in 1995, it was re-released and peaked at number 13 in April. It is also the band's only song to date to appear on the US Billboard Hot 100 chart, at number 53. "Sour Times" was the band's first entry on the Australian ARIA top 100 singles chart, peaking at number 66 in March 1995. The B-side track "Airbus Reconstruction" was actually recorded by the band Airbus, who were former school friends of Geoff Barrow.

== Critical reception ==
"Sour Times" received positive reviews from most music critics. Upon the release, Larry Flick from Billboard magazine wrote, "And yet, we truly believe that imaginative turntable artists will give this jewel a casual spin and be forever moved by its slowly insinuating acid-jazz/funk rhythms, [and] compelling Edith Piaf-like vocals by Beth Gibbons". Dave Sholin from the Gavin Report described the song as a "moody, mysterious and haunting production." Chuck Campbell from Knoxville News Sentinel felt the "stalking" track is "a modern rock hit that could bloom into more for the English band, but the single's relative directness doesn't accurately reflect the more obscure path the group favors." In his weekly UK chart commentary, James Masterton wrote, "Its the kind of gloriously understated piece of melancholia that is normally supposed to appeal to students but is actually far too good to be wasted solely on that market." Simon Reynolds from Melody Maker named it Single of the Week, saying, "Portishead's second single 'Sour Times' is absolutely brilliant, absolutely modern, and yet exudes, positively seeps, an absolutely British atmosphere." Upon the re-release, Melody Maker editor Michael Bonner commented, "Beth Gibbons' nicotine-stained voice glides across a backing track as dark and sexy as a midnight stroll round Paris. Sinister, shifting keyboard riffs sound like they only just missed the audition to soundtrack the next David Lynch film." Music & Media wrote, "The single 'Sour Times' with the majestic twang guitar and the sleepy vocals by Beth Gibbons is of disproportionate beauty compared to anything else out currently."

Alan Jones from Music Week gave the song a score of four out of five, adding, "Their first single, 'Numb', was a non-starter, but Portishead make a quantum jump with this single. This is a melancholy, wistful and worthy successor to the widescreen meanderings of fellow Bristolians Massive Attack, with a soulful vocal and tense backing track that evokes Bond movies and Spaghetti Westerns in equal measure. A spinechiller, and a hit." Another Music Week editor, Andy Beevers, stated, "Hot on the heels of their critically acclaimed 'Numb', the Bristol duo are re-releasing this single which first appeared as a very limited self-financed white label several months back. It is another moody downbeat tune featuring melancholy vocals, although it is a less leftfield and more complete song than 'Numb'." David Quantick from NME wrote, "Like the great second Specials album and subsequent singles, Portishead take film theme type strands and spooky tunes and make some kind of odd pop with them. 'Sour Times' is as splendid as its title and a great creepy song." James Hamilton from the Record Mirror Dance Update named it as a "tremulous gentle girl sighed doodling atmospheric Twin Peaks/From Russia With Love-ish 94bpm pop swayer". Charles Aaron from Spin opined, "Figures it would take two pale British hip-hop heads to finally dream up some modern lounge music that doesn't sound totally deracinated or desexed." Another editor, Jonathan Bernstein, named it the group's "most wistful song", remarking that it's "fraught with anticipation of impending calamity, in part due to the employment of a theremin, the device the Beach Boys used to make 'Good Vibrations' sound so spooky."

== Music video ==
The music video for "Sour Times" was directed by Alexander Hemming and produced by Liz Ross for Flat Fish Films. It was released on 25 July 1994 and taken from a 10-minute short film, To Kill a Dead Man, featuring the band cast in a thriller.

== Track listings ==
- CD 1
1. "Sour Times" (4:14)
2. "It's a Fire" (3:47)
3. "Pedestal" (3:41)
4. "Theme from To Kill a Dead Man" (4:25)
- CD 2
1. "Sour Times" (edit) (3:25)
2. "Sour Sour Times" (5:49)
3. "Lot More" (4:21)
4. "Sheared Times" (4:03)
5. "Airbus Reconstruction" (5:08)
- Although they bear new titles, all tracks on CD 2 are remixes of "Sour Times"

== Personnel ==
Portishead

- Beth Gibbons – vocals
- Geoff Barrow – programming
- Adrian Utley – guitar

Additional musicians

- Neil Solman – Rhodes piano, Hammond organ

Samples

- Lalo Schifrin – sample of "The Danube Incident"
- Smokey Brooks – sample of "Spin It Jig"

== Charts ==
Chart (1994–1995)	Peak position
Australia (ARIA)	66
Canada Top Singles (RPM)	29
Israel (Israeli Singles Chart)	20
Netherlands (Single Top 100 Tipparade)	5
Scottish Singles Sales (Official Charts)	13
UK Singles (Official Charts)	13
UK Dance (Official Charts)	28
UK Dance (Music Week)	28
US Billboard Hot 100	53
US Alternative Airplay (Billboard)	5
US Alternative Top 50 (Radio & Records)	7

== Certifications ==
Region	Certification	Certified units/sales
New Zealand (RMNZ)	Gold	15,000^{‡}
United Kingdom (BPI)	Silver	200,000^{‡}
^{‡} Sales+streaming figures based on certification alone.

== Covers and in popular culture ==
The Blank Theory covered "Sour Times" on their Beyond the Calm of the Corridor release, which was featured in the trailer for Wicker Park.

Velvet Chain covered "Sour Times" on their 1997 album Warm.

"Sour Times" was used as the theme music to the ITV drama series The Vice, and also appeared in the films Assassins and Killing Time in addition to the TV shows Warehouse 13 (the "Sour Sour Times" version from CD2) and The People v. O.J. Simpson: American Crime Story.

The song was sampled in the 2004 single "Teardrops" by the 411.

The name of Turkish social network Ekşi Sözlük (Sour Dictionary) was derived from "Sour Times". This network was founded as a part of sourtimes.org in 1999.

English singer Marsha Ambrosius covered the song on her 2011 album Late Nights & Early Mornings.
