= Clive Deamer =

English drummer (born 1961)

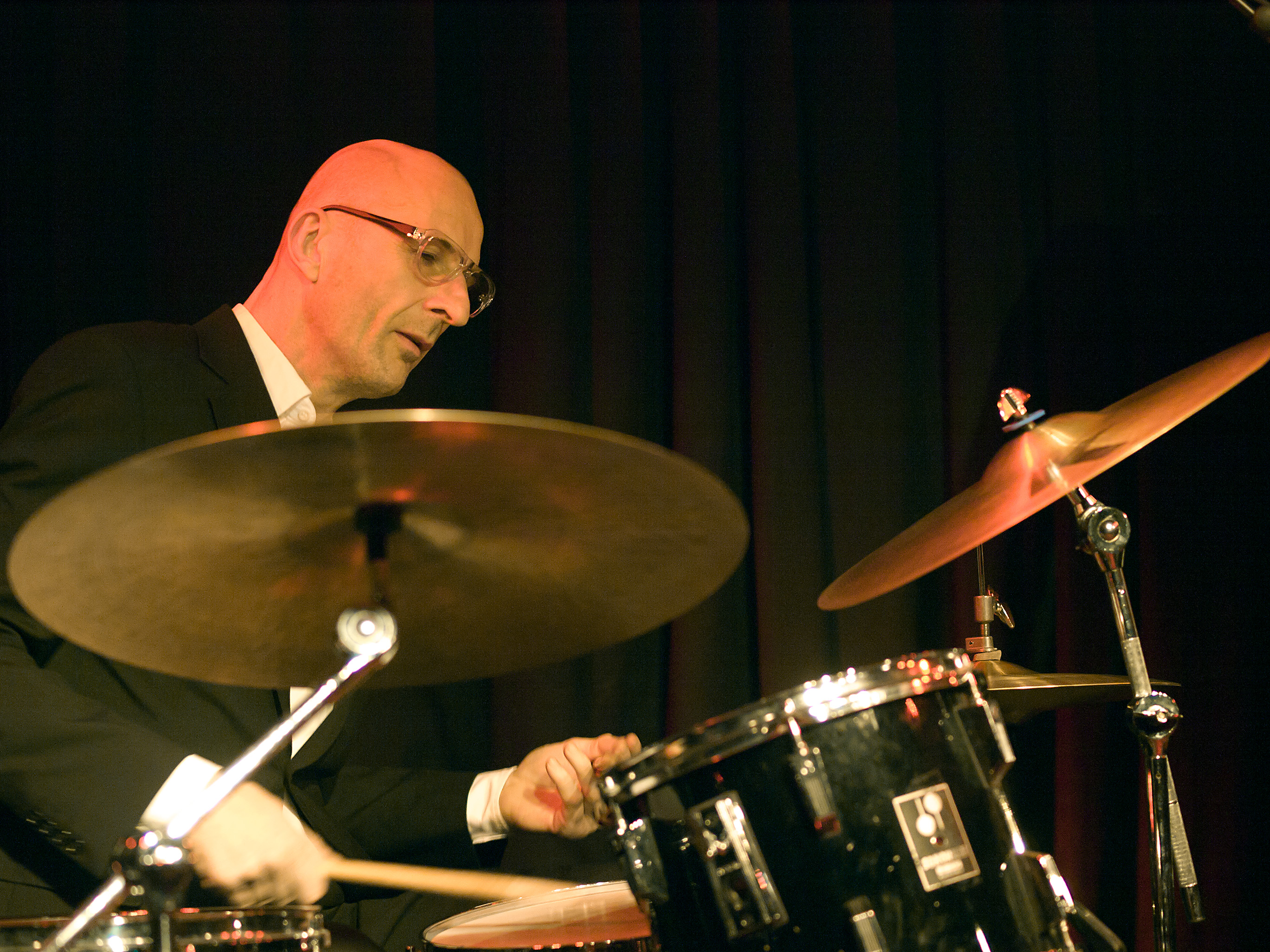
- Deamer performing with Get the Blessing in 2011.

Background information
- Born: Bath, Somerset, United Kingdom
- Genres: Jazz; alternative rock; trip hop
- Occupation: Drummer
- Years active: 1983–present
- Member of: Get the Blessing
- Formerly of: Roni Size & Reprazent; Hawkwind; Robert Plant

Clive Deamer is an English drummer and percussionist who has been the drummer for the jazz band Get the Blessing since 2000. He has worked with acts including Radiohead, Portishead, Jeff Beck, Alison Moyet, Siouxsie Sioux, Roni Size, Hawkwind, Robert Plant and Reprazent.

== Biography ==
Deamer was the drummer of Hawkwind between 1983 and 1985. The band leader, Dave Brock, later said Deamer was "too professional", and he was replaced with Danny Thompson Jr. Deamer was the drummer of the rhythm and blues revival group Big Town Playboys and appeared on albums including Crazy Legs (1993) with Jeff Beck.

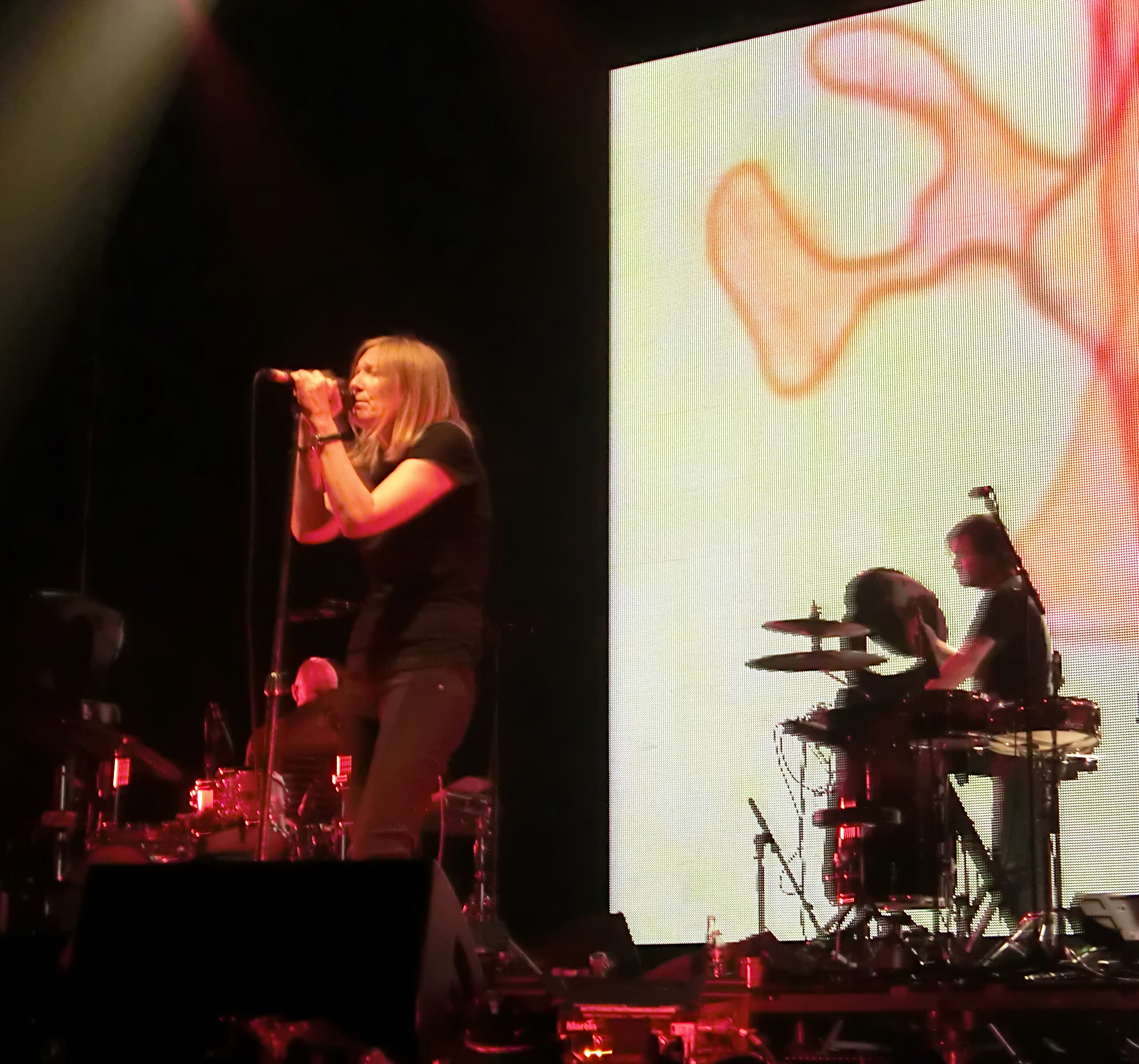
Deamer (left; on drums) with Portishead in 2013

Deamer has drummed for Portishead since 1994, playing on Dummy (1994), Portishead (1997) and Roseland NYC Live (1998) and Third (2008). He appeared on the 1997 album New Forms by Roni Size & Reprazent, which won the Mercury Music Prize.

In 2000, Deamer formed the jazz band Get the Blessing with Jim Barr (bass), Jake McMurchie (saxophone) and Pete Judge (trumpet), in Bristol. From 2001 to 2007, Deamer was a member of Robert Plant's backing band. He first met Plant at Plant's daughter's wedding in 1991 when Deamer was playing with Big Town Playboys. Deamer appeared on Plant's albums Dreamland (2002) and Mighty ReArranger (2005).

Deamer worked with the French singer Damien Saez on the albums God Blesse / Katagena (2002), Debbie (2004) and Paris (2008). He participated in Saez's Yellow Tricycle project for the album To Lovers Prayer (2009). He recorded with Siouxsie Sioux on her 2007 album Mantaray.

Deamer joined Radiohead as the second drummer on the tours for the albums The King of Limbs (2011) and A Moon Shaped Pool (2016). He also performed in the live video The King of Limbs: Live from the Basement and on the 2011 double single "The Daily Mail" and "Staircase", and played additional drums on A Moon Shaped Pool. The Radiohead drummer, Philip Selway, said: "One [of us] played in the traditional way, the other almost mimicked a drum machine. It was push-and-pull, like kids at play, really interesting." In 2014, Deamer collaborated with Jonny and Colin Greenwood from Radiohead on the track "Under The Paving-Stones, the Beach!", on the soundtrack of the film Inherent Vice.

== Discography ==
| Year | Artist | Title | Notes | Cite |
|---|---|---|---|---|
| 1983 | Kevin Brown | Road Dreams | drums | |
| 1983 | The Glee Club | Let My People Twist! | drums | |
| 1989 | Champion Jack Dupree With The Big Town Playboys | Live At Burnley | drums | |
| 1990 | Kevin Brown | Rust | drums on four tracks | |
| 1990 | Big Town Playboys | Now Appearing | drums | |
| 1992 | Headmaster | The Kids Said Rock | drums | |
| 1993 | Kevin Brown | Time Marches On | drums | |
| 1993 | Jeff Beck & the Big Town Playboys | Crazy Legs | drums and backing vocals | |
| 1994 | John Gotting | A Month Of Sundays + The Best Of Johnny G | drums on four tracks | |
| 1994 | Andy Davis Band | Andy Davis Band | drums and vocals | |
| 1994 | Portishead | Dummy | drums | |
| 1996 | Roni Size / Reprazent | Reasons For Sharing | drums | |
| 1997 | Roni Size / Reprazent | New Forms | drums | |
| 1997 | Portishead | Portishead | drums on four tracks | |
| 1998 | Portishead | Roseland NYC Live | drums on all but two tracks, percussion on one | |
| 1998 | Dr John | Anutha Zone | drums on two tracks | |
| 1998 | The Insects & Richard Grassby-Lewis Featuring Jon Hassell | Love And Death On Long Island soundtrack | drums | |
| 1998 | David Ferguson | The View From Now | percussion | |
| 1999 | Day One | Waiting For A Break | drums on one track | |
| 1999 | Emiliana Torrini | Love in the Time of Science | drums on one track | |
| 1999 | Tom Jones | Reload | drums and timpani on one track with Portishead | |
| 2000 | Goldfrapp | Felt Mountain | drums on one track | |
| 2000 | Mark Springer | Nature/Music/Food/The Stars And The Planets | percussion on three tracks | |
| 2000 | Day One | Ordinary Man | drums on three tracks | |
| 2001 | Beth Hirsch | Titles & Idols | drums on one track | |
| 2002 | Beth Gibbons & Rustin Man | Out Of Season | drums on three tracks | |
| 2002 | Alison Moyet | Hometime | drums on one track | |
| 2002 | Baxter Dury | Len Parrot's Memorial Lift | drums on one track | |
| 2007 | Siouxsie | Mantaray | Drums and percussion | |
| 2012 | Radiohead | "The Daily Mail" / "Staircase" | Drums and percussion | |
| 2016 | Radiohead | A Moon Shaped Pool | Additional drums on "Ful Stop" | |
