= Dummy (album) =

Studio album by Portishead
- Released: 22 August 1994
- Recorded: 1993–1994
- Studios: State of Art and Coach House Studios, Bristol
- Genre: Trip hop
- Length: 49:21
- Labels: Go! Beat; London
- Producers: Portishead; Adrian Utley

Portishead chronology
Dummy (1994)	Glory Times (1995)

Singles from Dummy
- 1. "Numb" Released: 13 June 1994; 2. "Sour Times" Released: 1 August 1994; 3. "Glory Box" Released: 26 September 1994

Dummy is the debut studio album by English electronic music band Portishead, released on 22 August 1994 by Go! Beat Records.

The album received critical acclaim and won the 1995 Mercury Music Prize. It is often credited with popularising the trip hop genre, and is frequently cited in lists of the best albums of the 1990s. Dummy was certified triple platinum in the UK in February 2019, and had sold 920,000 copies in the United Kingdom as of September 2020. Worldwide, the album had sold 3.6 million copies by 2008.

== Background ==
Geoff Barrow and Beth Gibbons met during an Enterprise Allowance course in February 1991. They started recording their first ideas for the songs in Neneh Cherry's kitchen in London while Barrow was hired by her husband Cameron McVey to work on her second album, Homebrew (1992). In Bristol, they recorded at the Coach House Studios. The first song that they finished for the album was "It Could Be Sweet" in 1991. There Adrian Utley met Barrow while they were recording, heard this track and started exchanging ideas on music. Barrow taught Utley sampling while Utley introduced the band to unusual sounds such as cimbaloms and theremins, which led to an "amalgamation of ideas". According to Barrow, "It was like a light-bulb coming on" when Utley joined them, and they realised they could make their own samples not found on other records, and created one of the most distinctive sounds of the decade.

The production of the album uses a number of hip hop techniques, such as sampling, scratching, and loop-making. The album was not recorded digitally. They sampled music from other records, but they also recorded their own original music, which was then recorded onto vinyl records before manipulating them on record decks to sample. In order to create a vintage sound, Barrow said that they distressed the vinyl records they had recorded by "putting them on the studio floor and walking across them and using them like skateboards", and they also recorded the sound through a broken amplifier. For the track "Sour Times", the album samples Lalo Schifrin's "The Danube Incident" and Smokey Brooks' (Henry Brooks, Otis Turner) "Spin It Jig"; for "Strangers", Weather Report's (Wayne Shorter) "Elegant People"; for "Wandering Star", War's "Magic Mountain"; for "Biscuit", Johnnie Ray's "I'll Never Fall in Love Again" (not the Bacharach/David song); and for "Glory Box", Isaac Hayes' "Ike's Rap II".

Dummy was released in August 1994. It helped to cement the reputation of Bristol as the capital of trip hop, a nascent genre which was then often referred to simply as "the Bristol sound". Listing it among the best trip hop albums, Fact said in 2015 that Dummy "was soaked in the same DIY, melting pot approach that typified much of Bristol's output at the time", and "laid bare the potentials afforded by sidestepping rigid genre formats." The album helped trip hop cross over to mainstream popularity, with music journalist Simon Reynolds reporting in 1995 that Dummy had become "popular background music in cafes and boutiques" and found appeal among audiences of other genres, including alternative rock and R&B listeners.

=== Singles ===
The first song released from the album was "Numb". Two further singles were released from the album: "Glory Box", which reached number 13 on the UK Singles Chart; and "Sour Times", which was released before "Glory Box" but re-released after the success of "Glory Box", also reaching number 13 on its re-release in 1995. The success of both singles drove the sales of the album, which eventually reached number two on the UK Albums Chart. "Sour Times" achieved moderate success in the U.S., reaching peak positions of number five and number 53 on the Billboard Alternative Airplay and Hot 100 charts, respectively, in February 1995. On 3 December 2008, Universal Music Japan released Dummy and Portishead as limited SHM-CD versions.

The tracks "Roads" and "Strangers" were used in the soundtrack of the film Nadja.

== Music ==
Philip Sherburne assessed the album's style and instrumentation: "Despite its reputation as one of the cornerstones of trip-hop, Bristol trio Portishead’s 1994 debut is much darker—and stranger—than the conventional wisdom might lead you to believe. [...] Geoff Barrow wasn’t much interested in ambient music. [...] Sampling vintage soul and channeling the spirit of old spy movies, he and 37-year-old guitarist Adrian Utley sketched out a skeletal strain of boom-bap where dial-tone buzz and homemade breakbeats swam in an ocean of silence. It was 29-year-old singer Beth Gibbons who was tasked with filling in that emptiness, but despite the warmth of her Billie Holiday-indebted croon her singing is uniformly forlorn, her presence as unsettling as it is intimate."

== Artwork ==
The cover of the album is a still image of vocalist Beth Gibbons taken from To Kill a Dead Man—the short film that the band created—for which the self-composed soundtrack earned the band its record contract.

== Critical reception ==
Professional ratings
Review scores
Source	Rating
AllMusic	5/5 stars
Chicago Tribune	3.5/4 stars
Entertainment Weekly	A−
Los Angeles Times	3.5/4 stars
NME	9/10
Pitchfork	9.5/10
Q	4/5 stars
Rolling Stone	4/5 stars
Select	4/5
Uncut	10/10

Upon release, Dummy received universal acclaim from critics. NME reviewer Stephen Dalton summed up the record by writing: "This is, without question, a sublime debut album. But so very, very sad." He observed, "From one angle, its languid slowbeat blues clearly occupy similar terrain to soulmates Massive Attack and all of Bristol hip-hop's extended family. But from another these are avant-garde ambient moonscapes of a ferociously experimental nature." Dalton concluded that "Portishead's post-ambient, timelessly organic blues are probably too left-field, introspective and downright Bristolian to grab short-term glory as some kind of Next Big Thing. But remember what radical departures Blue Lines, Ambient Works and Debut were for their times and make sure you hear this unmissable album." Melody Maker's Sharon O'Connell stated that the band "are undeniably the classiest, coolest thing to have appeared in this country for years ... Dummy, their debut, takes perfectly understated blues, funk and rap/hip hop, brackets all this in urban angst and then chills it to the bone." She described the record as "musique noire for a movie not yet made, a perfect, creamy mix of ice-cool and infra-heat that is desolate, desperate and driven by a huge emotional hunger, but also warmly confiding ... Most of us waver hopelessly between emotional timidity and temerity the whole of our lives and Dummy marks out that territory perfectly."

In Q, Martin Aston lauded Dummy as "perhaps the year's most stunning debut album" and proclaimed that "the singer's frail, wounded-sparrow vocals and Barrow's mastery of jazz-sensitive soul/hip hop grooves and the almost forgotten art of scratching are an enthralling combination". Ben Thompson said in Mojo that "Portishead make music for an early evening drinks party on the set of The Third Man. There is nothing kitschy about them either ... Beth Gibbons' voice has a genuine chill to it, and Geoff Barrow's background soundscapes are worthy of Lalo Schiffrin and Nellee Hooper." Tim Marsh of Select wrote: "Jumbling up hip hop, blues, jazz, dub and John Barry-esque TV theme tunes with the edgy lyrics and valium vocals of Beth Gibbons, it's lounge music for arty schizos."

Reviews in the United States were also positive. Paul Evans remarked in Rolling Stone: "From tape loops and live strings, Fender Rhodes riffing and angelic singing, these English subversives construct très hip Gothic hip-hop ... Assertive rhythms and quirky production, however, save Portishead from languishing in any coy retro groove. Instead they manage yet another – very smart – rebirth of cool." Entertainment Weekly's Steven Mirkin found the album "as musically compelling as it is emotionally chilly", while Lorraine Ali praised it in the Los Angeles Times as "a new world of sonic esoterica ... lush and rich, yet delicate and haunting." Chicago Tribune critic Greg Kot credited Portishead for achieving a "musical richness" despite working in a "single, melancholy vein" throughout Dummy. In the Pazz & Jop, polling prominent American critics nationwide, Dummy was voted the 14th-best album of 1994. The poll's supervisor Robert Christgau, however, remained relatively lukewarm, highlighting "Sour Times" and "Wandering Star" while briefly appraising the album overall as "Sade for androids".

== Legacy ==
Retrospective reviews of the album have praised it highly. AllMusic's John Bush wrote: "Portishead's album debut is a brilliant, surprisingly natural synthesis of claustrophobic spy soundtracks, dark breakbeats inspired by frontman Geoff Barrow's love of hip-hop, and a vocalist (Beth Gibbons) in the classic confessional singer/songwriter mold ... Better than any album before it, Dummy merged the pinpoint-precise productions of the dance world with pop hallmarks like great songwriting and excellent vocal performances." Laura Barton recommended it as Portishead's key release in Uncut, commenting that the band, by setting their own original compositions to looped and scratched samples from "distressed vinyl", created "an introspective and avant-garde blues". In 2010, BBC Music reviewer Mike Diver called Dummy "quite simply one of the greatest debut albums of the 1990s" and said that "the constituents that make up much of this collection are easily traced – back to dub, to soul, and especially to hip hop ... But it's the manner in which the pieces come together that makes Dummy special to this day ... Imitators have come and gone, but no act has reproduced the disquieting magnificence conjured here except Portishead themselves." Writing for Pitchfork in 2017, Philip Sherburne summarised that "Portishead's 1994 debut is a masterwork of downbeat and desperation. They invented their own kind of virtuosity, one that encompassed musicianship, technology, and aura." Later, in 2022, Sherburne said of the album: "In the 28 years since, few soundtracks to dorm-room hookups have inspired a greater sense of dread." Pitchfork listed the album as number eleven on its list of the best albums of the 1990s. In 2024, Paste wrote the Dummy has "aged the most gracefully and remains the most timely" for the "jazzed-out hip-hop" of its era.

=== Accolades ===
Dummy won the 1995 Mercury Music Prize, ahead of other shortlisted albums including PJ Harvey's To Bring You My Love, Oasis' Definitely Maybe, and Tricky's Maxinquaye.

- Associated Press - Voted as one of the top 10 pop albums of the 1990s.
- Melody Maker - ranked number one album of the year.
- Mojo (p. 62) – Ranked No. 35 in Mojo's "100 Modern Classics".
- Mojo (January 1995, p. 50) – Included in Mojo's "25 Best Albums of 1994".
- The New York Times (5 January 1995, p. C15) – Included on Neil Strauss' list of the Top 10 Albums of '94.
- NME (8 December 2000, p. 29) – Ranked No. 29 in The NME "Top 30 Heartbreak Albums".
- NME (24 December 1994, p. 22) – Ranked No. 6 in NME's list of the "Top 50 Albums of 1994".
- NME (October 2013, p. 59) – Ranked No. 168 in NME's list of the '500 Greatest Albums of all time'.
- Q (December 1999, p. 82) – Included in Q Magazine's "90 Best Albums of the 1990s".
- Q (June 2000, p. 66) – Ranked No. 61 in Q's "100 Greatest British Albums".
- In 2000 it was voted number 41 in Colin Larkin's All Time Top 1000 Albums.
- Rolling Stone (13 May 1999, pp. 79–80) – Included in Rolling Stone's "Essential Recordings of the 90's".
- In 2003 and 2012, the album was ranked number 419 on Rolling Stone magazine's list of the 500 greatest albums of all time. In their 2020 revised edition of the list, Dummy was placed at number 131.
- Spin (September 1999, p. 140) – Ranked No. 42 in Spin Magazine's "90 Greatest Albums of the '90s".
- In 2003, Pitchfork ranked the album number 48 in their "Top 100 Albums of the 1990s" list. In their revised 2022 list, Pitchfork named the album #11.
- In 2015, Fact placed the album at No. 2 in their "50 Best Trip Hop Albums" list.
- The album was also included in the book 1001 Albums You Must Hear Before You Die.
- The Wire named Dummy its 1994 record of the year.
- The album is the subject of a title in Continuum's 33 1/3 series of books, published in October 2011.
- Apple Music – Ranked No. 67 in "Apple Music 100 Best Albums".

== Track listing ==
All tracks are written by Geoff Barrow, Beth Gibbons, and Adrian Utley, except where noted. "It Could Be Sweet", "Wandering Star", and "Biscuit" written by Barrow and Gibbons.

No.	Title	Writer(s)	Length
1.	"Mysterons"		5:02
2.	"Sour Times"	Barrow, Gibbons, Utley, Lalo Schifrin, Smokey Brooks, Otis Turner	4:14
3.	"Strangers"	Barrow, Gibbons, Utley, Wayne Shorter	3:55
4.	"It Could Be Sweet"	Barrow, Gibbons	4:16
5.	"Wandering Star"	Barrow, Gibbons, Lee Oskar, Jerry Goldstein, Morris Dickerson, Harold Ray Brown, Sylvester Allen, Howard E. Scott, Lonnie Jordan, Charles W. Miller	4:51
6.	"It's a Fire" (not on vinyl LP or original UK and European versions of album)		3:48
7.	"Numb"		3:54
8.	"Roads"		5:02
9.	"Pedestal"		3:39
10.	"Biscuit"	Barrow, Gibbons, Johnnie Ray	5:01
11.	"Glory Box"	Barrow, Gibbons, Utley, Isaac Hayes	5:06
Total length:			49:21

Canadian bonus track edition
No.	Title	Length
12.	"Sour Sour Times"	4:01

=== Samples ===
- "Sour Times" – contains samples of "The Danube Incident", written by Lalo Schifrin, and "Spin It Jig" performed by Smokey Brooks, written by Brooks and Otis Turner.
- "Strangers" contains a sample of "Elegant People" by Weather Report, written by Wayne Shorter.
- "Wandering Star" contains a sample of "Magic Mountain" by War, written by Lee Oskar, Jerry Goldstein, Morris Dickerson, Harold Ray Brown, Sylvester Allen, Howard E. Scott, Lonnie Jordan, and Charles W. Miller.
- "Biscuit" contains a sample of "I'll Never Fall in Love Again", written and performed by Johnnie Ray.
- "Glory Box" contains a sample of "Ike's Rap II", written and performed by Isaac Hayes.

== Personnel ==
All personnel credits for Dummy are adapted from the album's liner notes.

Portishead

- Geoff Barrow – Rhodes piano (tracks 1, 3, 4, 10); drums (tracks 6, 7); programming (tracks 2, 5, 7–9, 11); string arrangements; production
- Beth Gibbons – vocals, production

Additional personnel

- Dave McDonald – engineering; nose flute (track 8)
- Adrian Utley – guitar (tracks 1–3, 5, 8, 11); bass (tracks 6–9); theremin (track 1); Hammond organ (track 11); string arrangements (track 8); production
- Clive Deamer – drums (tracks 1, 3, 5, 7–10)
- Gary Baldwin – Hammond organ (tracks 5–7)
- Neil Solman – Rhodes piano (tracks 2, 8); Hammond organ (track 2)
- Richard Newell – drum programming (track 4)
- Strings Unlimited – strings (track 8)
- Andy Hague – trumpet (track 9)

== Charts ==
=== Weekly charts ===
1995 weekly chart performance for Dummy
Chart (1995)	Peak position
Australian Albums (ARIA)	23
Belgian Albums (Ultratop Flanders)	18
Belgian Albums (Ultratop Wallonia)	12
Canada Top Albums/CDs (RPM)	16
Dutch Albums (Album Top 100)	15
European Albums (Music & Media)	13
Finnish Albums (Suomen virallinen lista)	19
German Albums (Offizielle Top 100)	45
New Zealand Albums (RMNZ)	21
Norwegian Albums (VG-lista)	29
Scottish Albums (Official Charts)	4
Swedish Albums (Sverigetopplistan)	20
Swiss Albums (Schweizer Hitparade)	26
UK Albums (Official Charts)	2
UK Dance Albums (OCC)	1
UK R&B Albums (Official Charts)	1
US Billboard 200	79

2016 weekly chart performance for Dummy
Chart (2016)	Peak position
French Albums (SNEP)	52

=== Year-end charts ===
Year-end chart performance for Dummy
Chart (1995)	Position
Belgian Albums (Ultratop Flanders)	55
Belgian Albums (Ultratop Wallonia)	37
Canada Top Albums/CDs (RPM)	39
European Albums (Music & Media)	36
UK Albums (OCC)	28

== Certifications and sales ==
Certifications and sales for Dummy
Region	Certification	Certified units/sales
Belgium (BRMA)	Platinum	50,000^{*}
Canada (Music Canada)	Platinum	100,000^{^}
Italy (FIMI)	Gold	25,000^{‡}
New Zealand (RMNZ)	2× Platinum	30,000^{^}
Switzerland (IFPI Switzerland)	Gold	25,000^{^}
United Kingdom (BPI)	3× Platinum	920,000
United States (RIAA)	Gold	1,100,000
Summaries
Europe (IFPI)	2× Platinum	2,000,000^{*}
Worldwide	—	3,600,000
^{*} Sales figures based on certification alone.^{^} Shipments figures based on certification alone.^{‡} Sales+streaming figures based on certification alone.
