= Enterprise Allowance Scheme =

British government financial initiative

The Enterprise Allowance Scheme was an initiative set up by Margaret Thatcher's Conservative UK government which gave a guaranteed income of £40 per week to unemployed people who set up their own business. It was first announced on 13 November 1981, and piloted between January 1982 and July 1983, funding 3,331 individuals. Introduced nationwide in 1983 against a background of unemployment in Britain, it went on to fund 325,000 people, including Creation Records head Alan McGee, Superdry founder Julian Dunkerton, artist Tracey Emin and the founders of Viz magazine. Applicants were required to have £1,000 of capital and have produced a basic business plan.

Proponents of the scheme believed that it would have a great impact on unemployment, and support entrepreneurship. Critics pointed to figures which suggested that one in six of the start-up businesses failed in the first year, and said that it had no significant impact on unemployment figures as most of the start-ups were sole traders.

A similar scheme, the Back to Work Enterprise Allowance was set up in Ireland.

On 6 October 2010, a plan was announced by Work and Pensions Secretary Iain Duncan Smith to revive the scheme, giving mentoring and funding of up to £2,000 to those unemployed for over six months and wishing to start up their own business. The funding would include a weekly payment linked to the value of their benefit, and £1,000 for the purchase of equipment.
