= Portishead (band) =

English band

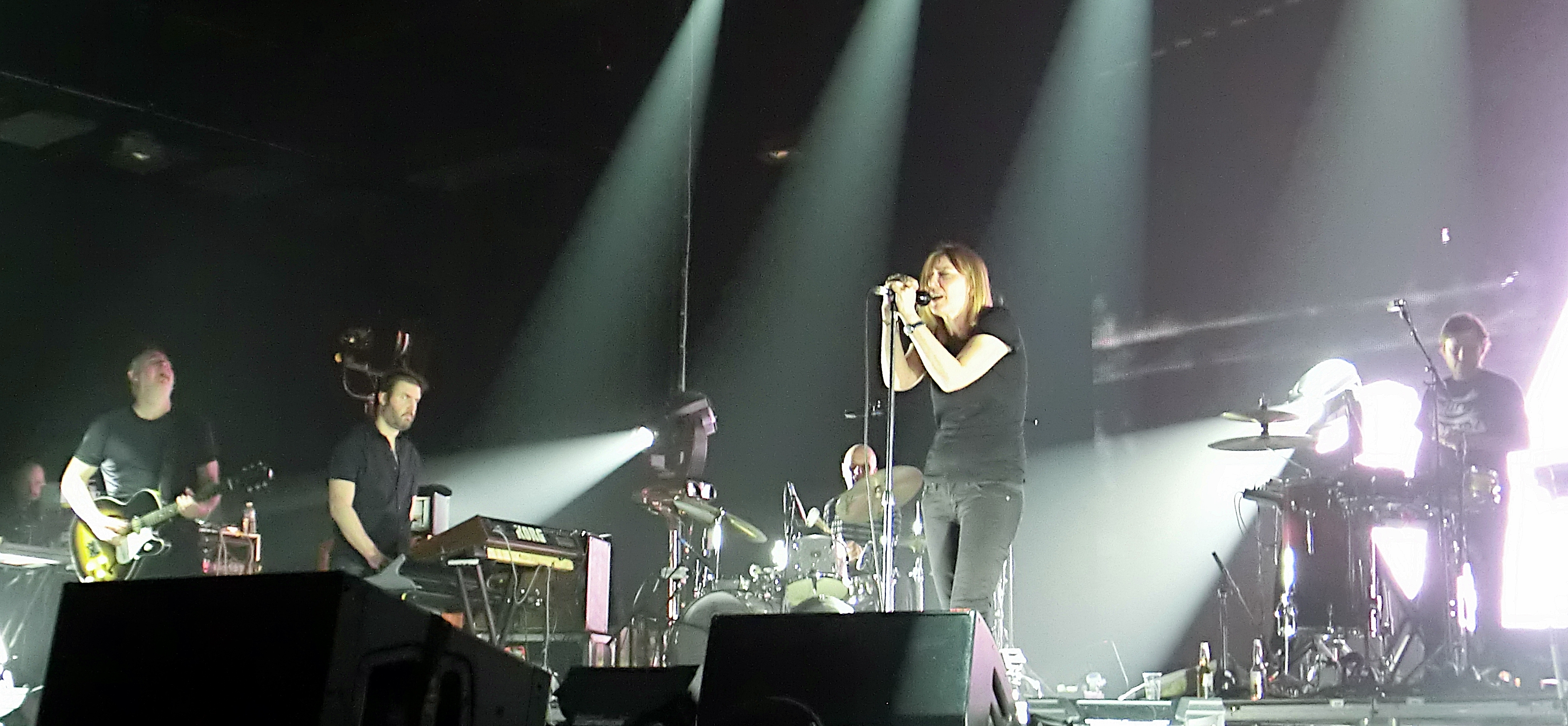
- Portishead performing in March 2013

Background information
- Origin: Bristol, England
- Genres: Trip hop; alternative rock; electronica; psychedelic rock; experimental rock
- Years active: 1991–present
- Labels: Go!; London; Island; Mercury
- Members: Beth Gibbons; Geoff Barrow; Adrian Utley
- Past members: Dave McDonald
- Website: portishead.co.uk

Portishead (/ˌpɔːrtɪsˈhɛd/ PORT-iss-HED) are an English electronic band formed in 1991 in Bristol. The band comprises Beth Gibbons (vocals), Geoff Barrow (multiple instruments, production), and Adrian Utley (guitar). Dave McDonald, an audio engineer who helped produce their first two albums, is sometimes regarded as the fourth member.

Portishead's debut album, Dummy (1994), fused hip-hop production with an atmospheric style reminiscent of spy film soundtracks and yearning vocals from Gibbons. It was met with critical acclaim and commercial success, becoming a landmark album in the emerging trip-hop genre. However, the band disliked being associated with the term. Their two other studio albums, Portishead (1997) and Third (2008), received similar acclaim. Portishead have also released the live album Roseland NYC Live (1998).

== History ==
=== Formation and Dummy (1991–1995) ===
Geoff Barrow and Beth Gibbons formed the band after meeting during a coffee break at an Enterprise Allowance course in Bristol in August 1991. Barrow knew an old local DJ Andy Smith who had a "brilliant record collection and had some soundtracks". He borrowed records off him all the time to sample tunes: he then used them as "straight up hip-hop" loops for their own material. The band took their name from their "dreary home town" Portishead, situated some 8 miles (13 km) to the west of Bristol. They soon recorded "It Could Be Sweet", their first song for their debut album. They then met Adrian Utley while they were recording at the Coach House Studios in Bristol, and Utley heard the first song Barrow and Gibbons had recorded, and began to exchange ideas on music. The resulting first album by Portishead, Dummy, was released in 1994. The cover features a still from the band's own short film To Kill a Dead Man. At this time, Portishead was a duo of Barrow and Gibbons. Utley (who co-produced the album, performed on nine of the songs, and co-wrote eight) became an official band member shortly after its release.

Despite the band's aversion to press coverage, the album was successful in both Europe and the United States (where it sold more than 150,000 copies even before the band toured there). Dummy was positively described by the Melody Maker as "musique noire for a movie not yet made". Rolling Stone praised its music as "Gothic hip-hop". Dummy spawned three singles: "Numb", "Sour Times", and "Glory Box", and won the Mercury Music Prize in 1995. The success of the album saw the band nominated for Best British Newcomer at the 1995 Brit Awards. Dummy was ranked number 131 on Rolling Stone magazine's list of the 500 Greatest Albums of All Time. The album is often considered one of the greatest trip hop albums to date and is a milestone in the definition of the genre.

=== Portishead and hiatus (1996–2004) ===
After their initial success, Portishead took a break from the spotlight and touring until their second album, Portishead, was released in 1997. The album's sound differed from Dummy, characterised as "grainy and harsher", with increased use of live instrumentation and less reliance on sampling. Three singles, "All Mine", "Over" and "Only You" were released, the first one achieving a Top 10 placing in the UK.

In 1997, the band performed a one-off show with strings at the Roseland Ballroom in New York City; primarily featuring recordings from the show, the live album, Roseland NYC Live, includes orchestral arrangements of the group's songs and was released in 1998. In 1999, Portishead recorded the song "Motherless Child" with Tom Jones for his album Reload. A DVD of Portishead's Roseland Ballroom performance, with substantial extra material including many early musical videos, was released in 2002. For the next few years, the band members concentrated on solo projects and other pursuits.

=== Third (2005–2008) ===
In February 2005, the band appeared live for the first time in seven years at the Tsunami Benefit Concert in Bristol. Around that time, Barrow revealed that the band was in the process of writing its third album. In August 2006, the band posted two new tracks on its MySpace page (called "Key Bored 299 03" and "Greek Jam"), described by Barrow as "doodles". Around the same time, Portishead covered Serge Gainsbourg's "Un Jour Comme un Autre (Requiem for Anna)" on the tribute album Monsieur Gainsbourg Revisited.

On 2 October 2007, Portishead stated that the new album Third had been mixed and was nearly complete, and was due for release in early April 2008. The release was later pushed to 28 April. On 8 and 9 December 2007, the band curated the All Tomorrow's Parties festival in Minehead, England. The festival featured their first full live sets in nearly 10 years. They premiered five tracks from the new album: "Silence", "Hunter", "The Rip", "We Carry On", and "Machine Gun". On 21 January 2008, a European tour to support the album was announced, together with a headline spot at the Coachella Valley Music and Arts Festival on 26 April 2008, their only U.S. date on the tour.

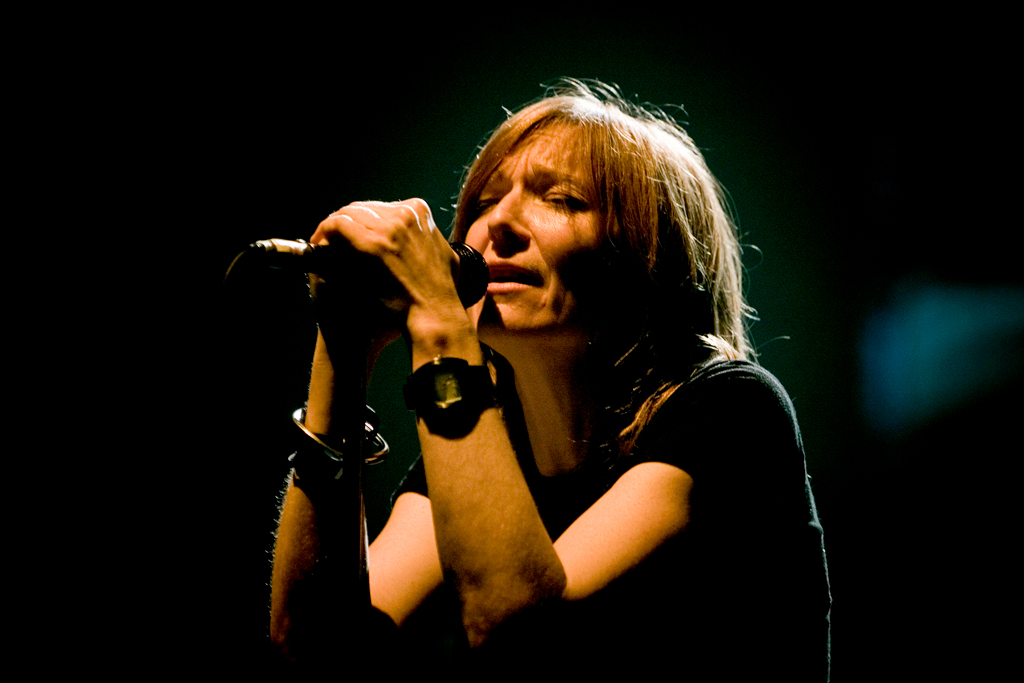
Gibbons in 2008

Third was made available on Last.fm the week before release, attracting 327,000 listeners in just under 24 hours. It was the first time Last.fm had made an album available before its official release date. The album was released on 29 April 2008 to coincide with the band's appearance at Coachella. On 18 May 2008, Barrow expressed Portishead's enthusiasm for recording new material on their website's blog, stating that he "can't wait to write some new tunes".

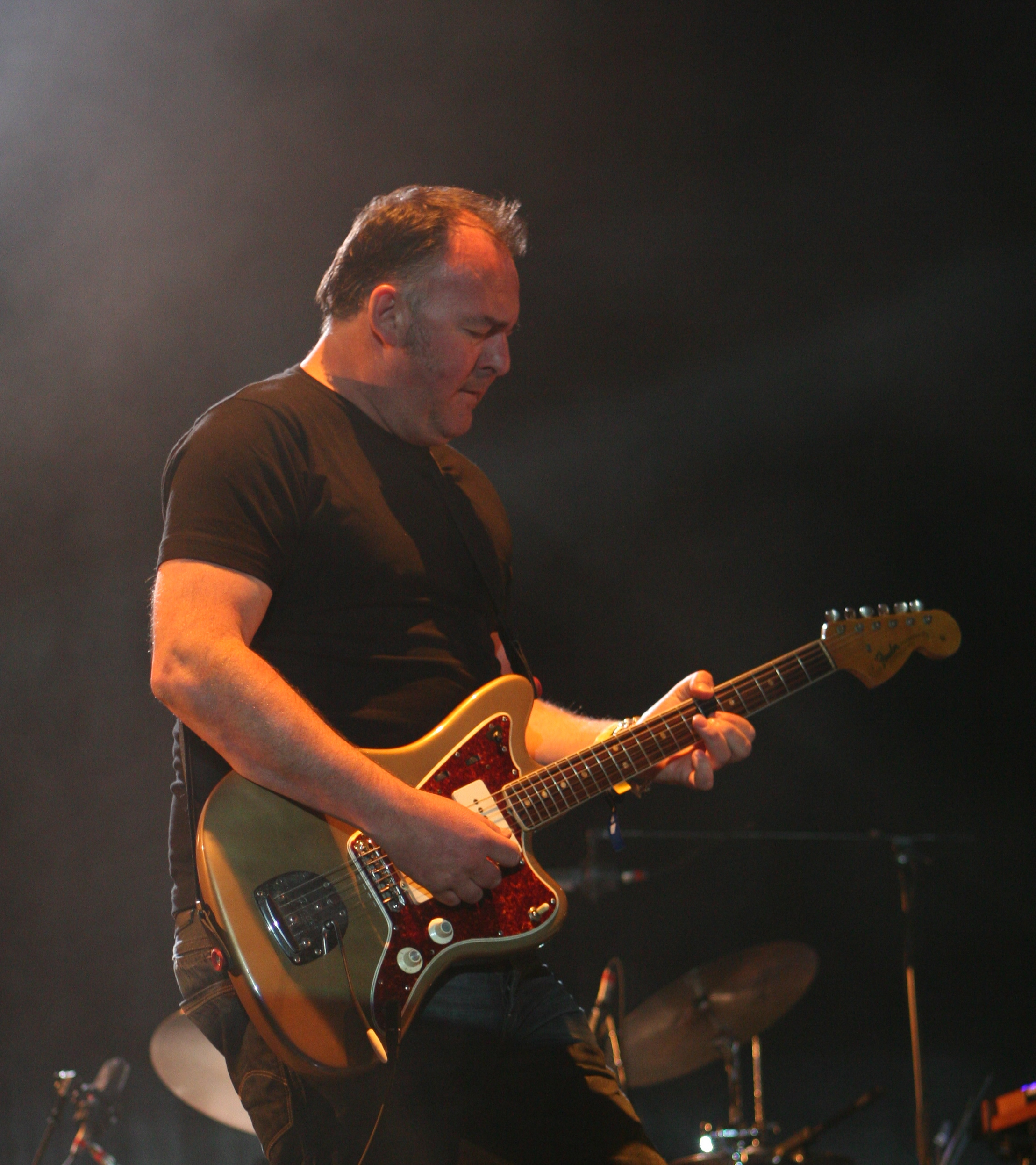
Utley in 2008

=== Later work (2009–2016) ===
On 28 September 2009, Barrow announced "big plans" for a new project with a new angle, hinting that an album could arrive as soon as late 2010. Whilst the album had yet to materialise, on 9 December 2009, the band released the song "Chase the Tear" for Human Rights Day to raise money for Amnesty International UK. Additionally, on 3 December 2008, Universal Music Japan reissued the albums Dummy and Portishead in limited edition on SHM-CD.

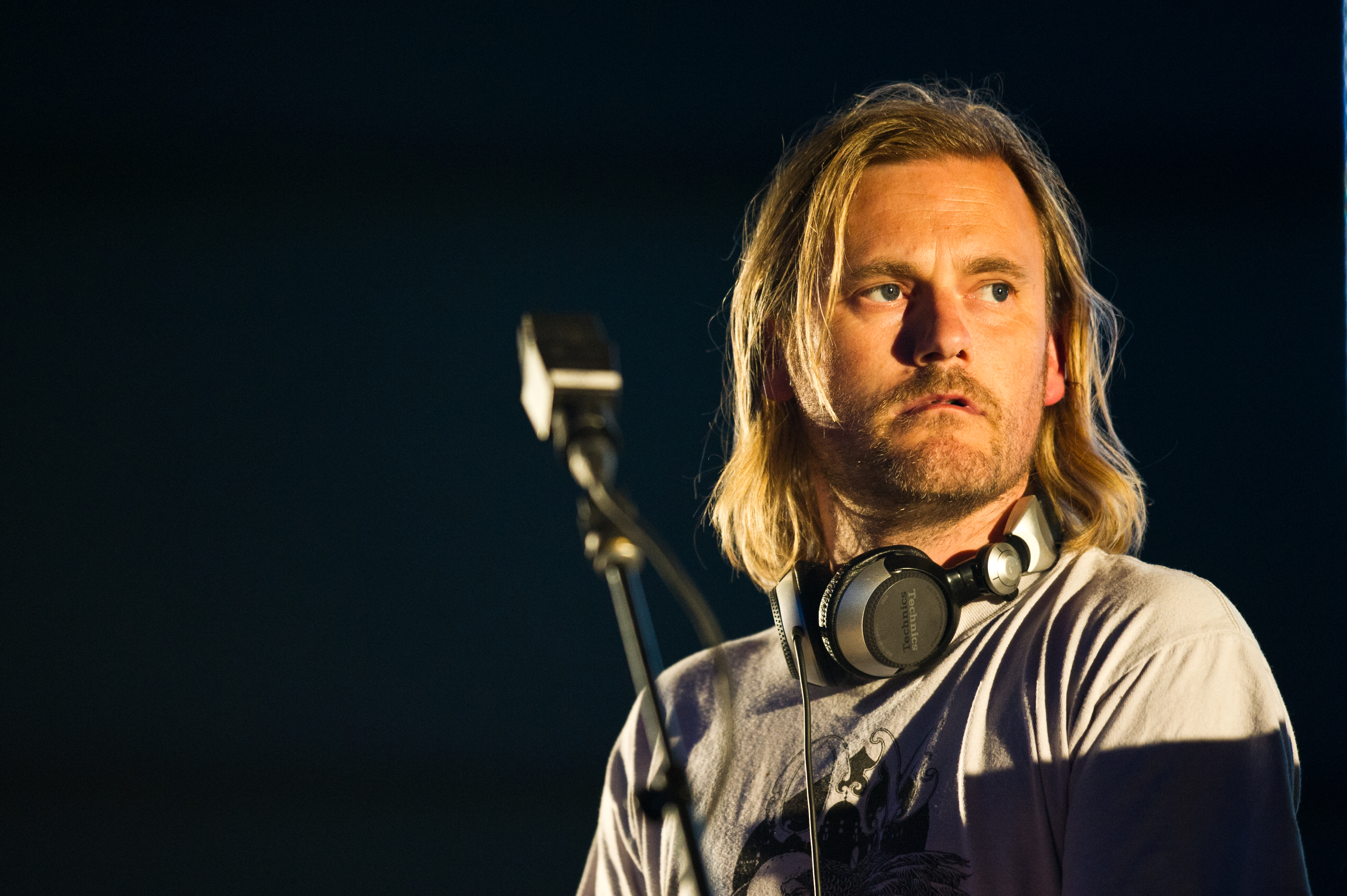
Barrow in 2011

During Summer 2011, Portishead performed at a number of festivals in Europe, including, Pohoda Festival, Exit Festival, Benicàssim Festival in Spain, Rock Werchter, Paleo Festival, Roskilde Festival, the Hurricane/Southside Festivals in Germany, and the Super Bock Super Rock music festival. The band also headlined and curated the line-up for two All Tomorrow's Parties music festivals entitled I'll Be Your Mirror, in London at Alexandra Palace on 23 and 24 July. The second took place in Asbury Park, New Jersey, from 30 September – 2 October. Barrow stated that he realised a "boyhood fantasy" when Chuck D of Public Enemy joined the band onstage at the "ATP I'll Be Your Mirror" festival curated by Portishead in Asbury Park, NJ in October 2011. He contributed his verse from the Public Enemy song "Black Steel in the Hour of Chaos" over Portishead's single "Machine Gun". Portishead then visited several cities in North America, including New York, Montreal, Toronto, Chicago, Mexico City, Los Angeles, Berkeley, Seattle, Vancouver, and Denver during October. The Chicago Tribune hailed the concert and noted: "horror-movie accents—Gothic organ, guitar lines thick with menacing reverb, spooky theremin—ensured a certain darkness". They finished their tour with a jaunt to Australia and New Zealand. Barrow stated in a Rolling Stone interview that he would begin work on his portion of the album in January 2012, jokingly pointing out that it could be another decade before a new album is released.

In 2013, the band headlined the Other Stage at the Glastonbury Music festival and embarked on a European tour. In summer 2014, they played several concerts around Europe. 2015 saw Portishead continue to perform live, playing festivals such as fib (Benicassim, Spain), Latitude (Southwold, Suffolk, UK), and the Montreux Jazz Festival (Montreux, Switzerland). Additionally, Portishead produced a cover of ABBA's song "SOS" for the soundtrack to the movie High-Rise which had a Gala screening at the London Film Festival on 9 October 2015. In 2016, the band won an Ivor Novello Award for Outstanding Contribution to British Music. On 22 June 2016, Portishead released a video for "SOS" that recontextualized the song in the wake of the then-recent murder of member of parliament Jo Cox and the Brexit vote.

=== 2022–present ===
On 2 May 2022, Portishead performed for the first time in seven years at O2 Academy Bristol. Organised by War Child UK, the concert benefited refugees and children affected by the Russian invasion of Ukraine. Gibbons also appeared on Kendrick Lamar's track "Mother I Sober" from the album Mr. Morale & the Big Steppers, released on 13 May. In 2023, Portishead reissued Roseland NYC Live with previously omitted songs and restored tracks. In September 2025 they performed Roads for Brian Eno's Together for Palestine show at London's Wembley Arena. Gibbons released her debut solo album, Lives Outgrown, in 2024. In 2025, Barrow said Portishead would not be creating music in the near future as he was focusing on film work. However, he said they had never broken up and "just do different stuff".

== Style and influences ==
Portishead's music was influenced by a wide range of singers and composers. New York hip-hop producers inspired them deeply for their ability to take "a sample from Shostakovich and have a big orchestral thing", and then taking "a horn riff from Fred Wesley or Miles Davis". Barrow and Utley were also inspired by Barry Gray and his orchestra and the music they recorded for sci-fi TV programs like Thunderbirds, Stingray, and Captain Scarlet. 1960s and 1970s soundtracks were another reference point because "there is emotion, and it's not hidden". Gibbons's voice has been compared to singer Billie Holiday's voice. Utley has mentioned the spaghetti western guitar music composed by Ennio Morricone as a big influence; he said that "[Morricone's] The Good, the Bad and the Ugly is the sort of soundtrack that I love". For their third album, the Guardian noted that the band "sounded unmistakably like themselves but also different" with a rockier version of their style with more guitars and more drums, as "haunted by the angry post-punk of Joy Division and Siouxsie and the Banshees".

== Members ==
Current members

- Beth Gibbons – vocals, production
- Geoff Barrow – turntables, piano, keyboards, synthesizers, programming, drums, production
- Adrian Utley – guitar, bass guitar, keyboards, synthesizers, programming, production

Recurring collaborators

- Dave McDonald – audio engineering, production; sometimes regarded as the fourth Portishead member
- Clive Deamer – drums
- Andy Smith - DJ

== Discography ==
- Dummy (1994)
- Portishead (1997)
- Third (2008)

== Awards and nominations ==
Year	Awards	Work	Category	Result	Ref.
1995	Mercury Prize	Dummy	Album of the Year	Won	
1995	NME Awards	Themselves	Best Dance Act	Nominated	
1995	MTV Europe Music Awards	Themselves	Best New Act	Nominated	
1995	Edison Awards	Themselves	Best International Dance/Rap	Won	
1995	Brit Awards	Themselves	British Breakthrough Act	Nominated	
1997	GAFFA Awards (Denmark)	Beth Gibbons	Best Foreign Female Act	Nominated	
1998	Žebřík Music Awards	Beth Gibbons	Best International Female	Nominated	
1999	Online Music Awards	Themselves	Best Alternative Fansite	Nominated	
2008	Rober Awards Music Prize	Themselves	Best Band	Won	
2008	Rober Awards Music Prize	Themselves	Cutting Edge	Won	
2008	Rober Awards Music Prize	Themselves	Best Electronica	Won	
2008	Rober Awards Music Prize	Third	Album of the Year	Won	
2008	Rober Awards Music Prize	"The Rip"	Single of the Year	Won	
2011	Rober Awards Music Prize	Themselves	Best Live Artist	Nominated	
2016	Ivor Novello Awards	Themselves	Outstanding Contribution to British Music	Won	
2016	Music Week Sync Awards	"SOS"	Film Soundtrack	Won	
2016	Rober Awards Music Poll	"SOS"	Best Cover Version	Won	

== See also ==
- Beak, musical project with Geoff Barrow
- Out of Season, Beth Gibbons and Rustin Man album
