= Geoff Barrow =

English musician

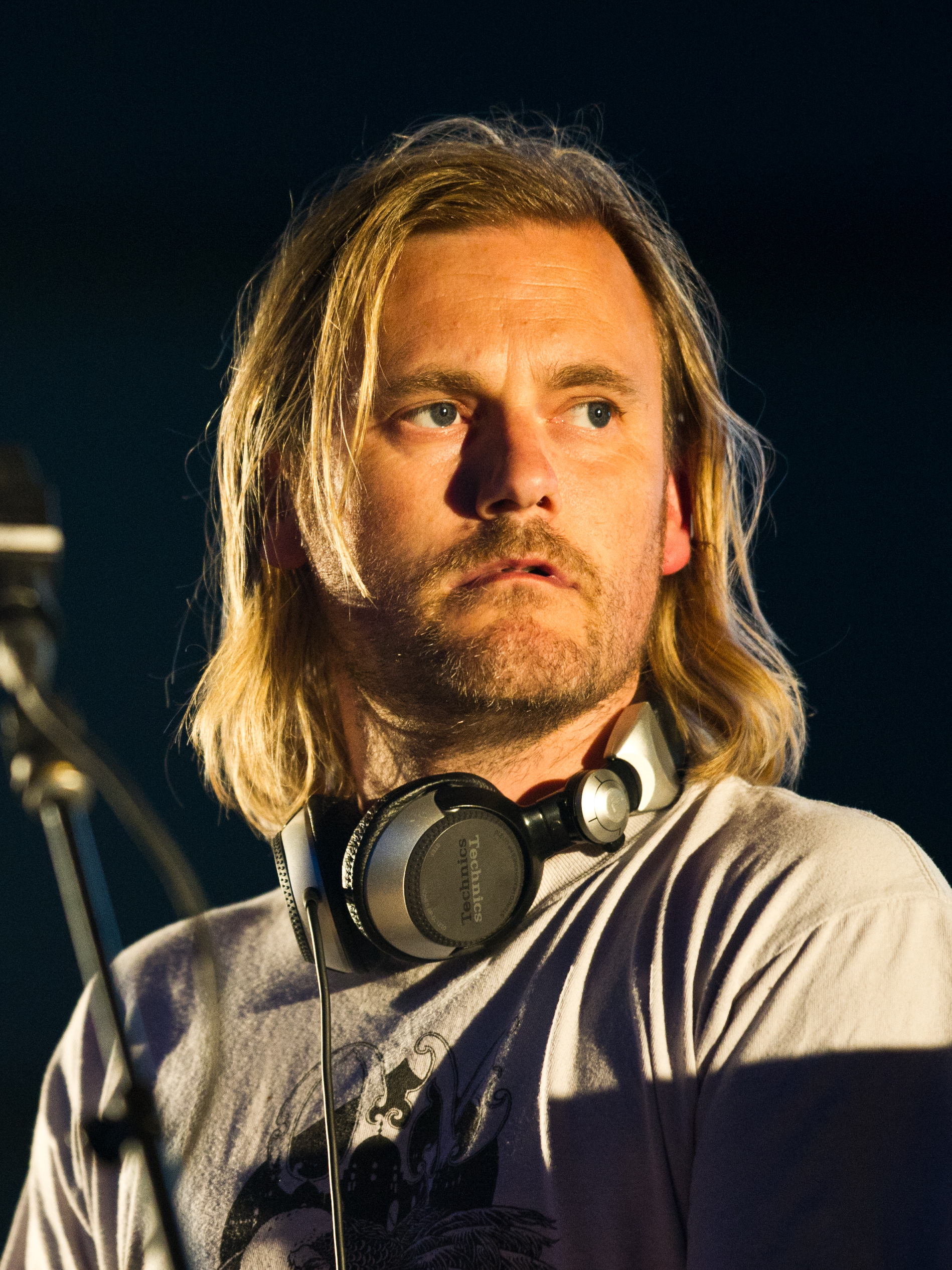
- Barrow performing with Portishead in 2011

Background information
- Born: Geoffrey Paul Barrow; 9 December 1971 (age 54)
- Origin: Portishead, North Somerset, England
- Genres: Electronic; trip hop; experimental
- Instruments: Turntables; samples; keyboards; drums
- Years active: 1991–present
- Label: Invada

Geoffrey Paul Barrow (born 9 December 1971) is an English music producer, composer, and DJ. He is a member of the bands Portishead, Beak, and Quakers, and he has scored several films.

Portishead was formed in 1991. He named the band after the small coastal town near Bristol where he grew up. On his intentions in forming Portishead, he has stated, "I just wanted to make interesting music, proper songs with a proper life span and a decent place in people's record collections." Barrow and Portishead became major figures in the Bristol underground scene, which gave rise to many artists with whom Barrow came to work in different capacities.

== Life and career ==
=== Portishead ===
Born in Walton in Gordano, Somerset, Geoff moved with his mother to the town Portishead when he was 11, after his parents divorced. After being involved in many local rock bands, playing drums and DJing in hip-hop groups, Barrow got his first job at the Coach House Studios as a tape operator soon after it opened in 1989. In 1991, while he was assisting on Massive Attack's breakthrough album Blue Lines, the band allowed him spare studio time to get his own ideas on tape. Soon after, Barrow met Beth Gibbons during a coffee break at an Enterprise Allowance course. They formed the band Portishead, later adding third member Adrian Utley, releasing their debut album Dummy in 1994 to critical acclaim. The group have since produced two more studio albums, a live album, and various singles in the years since. Their most recent album, Third, was released in April 2008. The group performed for the first time in seven years on 2 May 2022, as part of a War Child concert benefitting refugees and children affected by the Russian invasion of Ukraine.

=== Invada ===
In 2001, Barrow formed the Australian record label Invada, whose artist roster includes acts such as RuC.L and ARIA-award-winning group Koolism), together with Katalyst's Ashley Anderson. In 2003 he set up the UK arm of Invada, a more experimental music label with partner Fat Paul. Bands who released work through Invada included Gonga, Team Brick, Atavist, Joe Volk, malakai and Crippled Black Phoenix. Barrow co-produced and co-wrote Stephanie McKay's 2003 debut album, McKay, under the pseudonym Fuzzface. The album featuring songs co-penned by Tim Saul and Carl Hancock Rux.

=== Side-projects, producing and collaborations ===
At the dawn of the '90s, Barrow was making a name for himself as a remixer, working with such artists as Primal Scream, Paul Weller, Gabrielle and Depeche Mode. He produced a track for Tricky and wrote songs for Neneh Cherry, both of whom were based in Bristol and also worked with Massive Attack. He has remixed songs for both Gravediggaz and the Pharcyde. In 2005, Barrow and Portishead collaborator Adrian Utley produced the Coral's third album, The Invisible Invasion. In 2009, Barrow produced the Horrors' second album Primary Colours with Craig Silvey. He mixed the self-titled debut album by Billy Nomates, as well as her EP Emergency Telephone.

In 2009 he formed Beak with Billy Fuller (Fuzz Against Junk) and Matt Williams (Team Brick). Their self-titled album was released in 2009. In 2010 the group performed as the backing band for Anika's self-titled debut album. Barrow had met Anika, a political journalist, and proposed recording material together. The album was produced over twelve days, using one room, no overdubs or repair, and only edits to create arrangements. The album's lead single, "Yang Yang", was released on 17 November 2009 through Invada and Stones Throw Records in the US and Japan.

In early 2012, Barrow's new hip hop project Quakers was announced to be releasing an album on Stones Throw. He also formed the musical project Drokk with TV composer Ben Salisbury and released the album Drokk: Music inspired by Mega-City One, with songs inspired by the comic book character Judge Dredd. On 2 July Barrow, Billy Fuller and Matt Williams released their second Beak album through Invada. On 20 September 2018 the band, with Will Young replacing Williams, released their third album on Invada.

=== Film work ===
Barrow was the music supervisor for the Banksy film Exit Through the Gift Shop, which premiered at the Sundance Film Festival on 24 January 2010, and was released in April 2010.

In 2013, Barrow collaborated again with Ben Salisbury on the score for the film Ex Machina by Alex Garland, for whom the pair subsequently provided soundtracks for his 2018 film Annihilation, the 2020 miniseries Devs, the 2022 film Men, and in 2024 for Civil War. The duo also collaborated on the scores for the Black Mirror episode "Men Against Fire" and the Netflix series Archive 81. Barrow, Salisbury and Simon Ashdown produced the score for the Prime Video series Hanna.

Beak performed the soundtrack for Tom Geens' 2015 film Couple in a Hole, drawing largely on the band's earlier material. In 2016, Barrow scored the Ben Wheatley film Free Fire.

In 2025, Barrow produced the film Game under the Invada Films label, starring Jason Williamson.

== Credits ==
=== Production and guest appearances ===
Year	Album	Artist	Details	Ref.
1992	Homebrew	Neneh Cherry	Co-writer and co-producer of "Somedays"	
1994	Dummy	Portishead	As band member; co-producer, composer, drums, keyboards, string arrangements, programming	
1995	Radar	Earthling	Turntables	
1997	Portishead	Portishead	As band member; co-producer, composer, drums, turntables, programming, sampling	
1998	Roseland NYC Live	Portishead	As band member; co-producer, composer, drums, turntables, musical director	
1999	Reload	Tom Jones	Producer "Motherless Child" (as Portishead)	
2002	Len Parrot's Memorial Lift	Baxter Dury	Co-producer and drums	
2002	Gonga	Gonga	Mixing	
2003	McKay	Stephanie McKay	Producer	
2005	The Invisible Invasion	The Coral	Co-producer and mixing with Adrian Utley	
2007	A Love of Shared Disasters	Crippled Black Phoenix	Producer	
2008	Third	Portishead	As band member; co-producer, composer, drums, keyboards, synthesizer, bass, percussion, programming	
2009	Ugly Side of Love	Malachai	Executive producer	
2009	Primary Colours	The Horrors	Co-producer, mixing, engineering	
2009	BEAK>	Beak>	Co-producer, composer, instrumentation	
2010	Anika	Anika	Producer	
2012	Drokk: Music inspired by Mega-City One	Geoff Barrow and Ben Salisbury	Co-producer, composer, instrumentation	
2012	Quakers	Quakers	Producer	
2012	>>	Beak>	Co-producer, composer, instrumentation	
2014	Beyond Ugly	Malachai	Drums	
2015	Ex Machina (Original Motion Picture Soundtrack)	Geoff Barrow and Ben Salisbury	Co-producer, composer, instrumentation	
2015	Meow the Jewels	Run the Jewels	Remixing of "Close Your Eyes and Meow to Fluff"	
2015	Split	Beak> and <Kaeb	Extended play; co-producer, composer, instrumentation	
2016	Couple in a Hole (Original Soundtrack)	Beak>	Co-producer, composer, instrumentation	
2016	Black Mirror: Men Against Fire (Original Score)	Geoff Barrow and Ben Salisbury	Co-producer, composer, instrumentation	
2017	Everything Now	Arcade Fire	Additional production, synthesizer on "Creature Comfort"	
2017	Free Fire (Original Motion Picture Soundtrack)	Geoff Barrow and Ben Salisbury	Co-producer, composer, instrumentation	
2018	Annihilation (Original Motion Picture Soundtrack)	Geoff Barrow and Ben Salisbury	Co-producer, composer, instrumentation	
2018	>>>	Beak>	Co-producer, composer, instrumentation	
2019	Hanna	Geoff Barrow, Ben Salisbury and Simon Ashdown	Composer	
2019	Luce (Original Motion Picture Soundtrack)	Geoff Barrow and Ben Salisbury	Composer	
2020	Devs	Geoff Barrow and Ben Salisbury	Composer	
2020	Billy Nomates	Billy Nomates	Mixer	
2020	Emergency Telephone EP	Billy Nomates	Mixer	
2022	Archive 81	Geoff Barrow and Ben Salisbury	Composer	
2022	Men	Geoff Barrow and Ben Salisbury	Composer	
2024	Civil War	Geoff Barrow and Ben Salisbury	Composer	
2025	Game	Geoff Barrow and DJ Smudge	Producer, Composer, writer	
