= Crooked Wing =

Studio album by These New Puritans
- Released: 23 May 2025
- Studios: Big Jelly (Kent); Dustsucker (Kent); Love Electric (London); Tap (London); St Mary and All Saints Church (Essex); St Bartholomäus Church (Carinthia)
- Genre: Post-rock
- Length: 47:18
- Label: Domino
- Producers: Jack Barnett; Graham Sutton

These New Puritans chronology
Inside the Rose (2019)	Crooked Wing (2025)

Singles from Crooked Wing
- 1. "Industrial Love Song" Released: 11 March 2025; 2. "Bells" Released: 11 March 2025; 3. "A Season in Hell" Released: 29 April 2025; 4. "Wild Fields" Released: 20 May 2025

Crooked Wing is the fifth studio album by English art rock band These New Puritans. It was released on 23 May 2025 via Domino digitally, and in vinyl and CD. It features the singles "Industrial Love Song", "Bells", "A Season in Hell", and "Wild Fields". It received generally positive reviews from publications and an aggregate score of 83 from Metacritic.

== Background ==
Crooked Wing was released six years after the band's 2019 full-length project Inside the Rose, and is their first album released through Domino since their second studio album Hidden.

It was produced by the band's lead vocalist Jack Barnett and Bark Psychosis member Graham Sutton. George Barnett contributed as an executive producer. "Unconventional" instruments and field recordings were used on the album, alongside instruments such as bells and piano.

"Industrial Love Song" and "Bells" were released as a double-A side single on 11 March 2025. Harley Weir directed the music video of "Industrial Love Song", which features singer Caroline Polachek. Commenting about the collaboration with the band, Polachek stated, "Wrote to them in 2022 to express my love for Inside the Rose, and a few months later they sent me this exquisite song."

"A Season in Hell" was released as the third single on 29 April 2025, alongside a music video directed by Weir, which features Swedish actor Alexander Skarsgård. It was followed by "Wild Fields", the album's fourth single on 20 May 2025.

== Reception ==
Professional ratings
Aggregate scores
Source	Rating
Metacritic	83/100
Review scores
Source	Rating
AllMusic	4/5 stars
Beats Per Minute	73%
DIY	4/5 stars
Evening Standard	5/5 stars
Hot Press	8/10
The Line of Best Fit	8/10
MusicOMH	4/5 stars
Pitchfork	7.3/10
Record Collector	4/5 stars
The Skinny	4/5 stars

Crooked Wing was noted as "another accomplished, thought-provoking instalment from a duo operating from a highly distinctive position" by MusicOMH, "one of the year's most affecting and forward-thinking records" by God Is in the TV, "a document of the modern world wrestling for coexistence with the old world" by Flood Magazine, and "another fascinating album that continuously stimulates the imagination" by Oor. It was also described by the Quietus as "a masterpiece", Beats Per Minute as the band's "most elusive work to date", Record Collector as "often deftly beautiful", and the Evening Standard as "a fragile, beautiful record when not being chillingly brutal."

Tom Doyle of Mojo stated, "On their first album in six years, they occupy a strange and intriguing position somewhere between Talk Talk, Shriekback and 50 Words for Snow-period Kate Bush," also mentioning Steve Reich as an influence. In his review for Pitchfork with a rating of 7.3, Louis Pattinson called the album "an achievement, both as a stand-alone statement, and another point in their journey," citing "its craft and discipline" as a reason "their arc may yet rise higher."

Timothy Monger of AllMusic remarked, "Crooked Wing sounds at once ancient and eerily present with its electronic components creating an uncanny valley between moments of sublimity." Stereoboard's Jacob Brookman assigned the album a three-star rating and referred to it as "a versatile record; ambitious in scope, if occasionally weighed down by its own solemnity" and "a record made with the right intentions and a clear artistic vision." French magazine Télérama noted it as "difficult to classify" and "highly successful".

DIY's Tom Morgan described Crooked Wing as "an elegant, engrossing return, that marries its creators' love of both industrial and ecclesiastical aesthetics while remaining accessible and emotionally easy to grasp," noting "standouts among its darker turns" and referring to several songs as "rapturous" and "heavenly". Matt Young of London-based publication the Line of Best Fit commented that the album's "refusal to deliver easy pleasures might leave some cold, and for all its inventiveness, there are moments where the almost academic precision threatens to override the emotional core," giving it a rating score of eight.

Reviewing for Scottish magazine The Skinny, Joe Creely referred to "the absence of any great shock" on the album as "immediately shocking." In a 8/10-review, Paul Nolan of Irish magazine Hot Press labelled the release as "another wonderfully skewed and imaginative offering", calling it a gem. Ludovic Hunter-Tilney of the Financial Times stated, "It won't blare from every car this summer, but this richly configured album rewards attention."

== Track listing ==
All tracks are written by Jack Barnett.

Crooked Wing track listing
No.	Title	Length
1.	"Waiting"	3:08
2.	"Bells"	7:04
3.	"A Season in Hell"	5:03
4.	"Industrial Love Song" (featuring Caroline Polachek)	3:49
5.	"I'm Already Here"	6:10
6.	"Wild Fields"	4:05
7.	"The Old World"	3:51
8.	"Crooked Wing"	6:13
9.	"Goodnight"	5:49
10.	"Return"	2:06
Total length:		47:18

== Personnel ==
Credits adapted from the album's liner notes.

=== These New Puritans ===
- George Barnett – drums, percussion, bells, piano, direction, associate production, artwork
- Jack Barnett – voice, piano, pipe organ, vibraphone, bells, glockenspiel, crotales, cello, sound design, arrangements, production, painting, mixing on "Bells"

=== Additional contributors ===
- Alex Miller – treble voice
- Caroline Polachek – voice
- Chris Laurence – upright bass
- Christian Schmidt – pipe organ
- Ephyra Ana – voice, Cretan bell
- Hugh Wilkinson – vibraphone, glockenspiel
- Kevin O'Hara – French horn
- Maria Chiara Argirò – piano
- Patricia Auchterlonie – soprano voice
- Sophie Sleigh-Johnson – flute
- Thomas Hein – percussion
- Yazz Ahmed – trumpet, flugelhorn
- Graham Sutton – production, mixing
- Stuart Hawkes – mastering
- Thomas King – coordination
- Matthew Cooper – engineering
- Mike Collins – engineering assistance
- Jeremy Young – photography

== Charts ==
Chart performance for Crooked Wing
Chart (2025)	Peak position
Scottish Albums (Official Charts)	67
UK Independent Albums (Official Charts)	18
