= Inside the Rose =

2019 album by art rock band These New Puritans

Studio album by These New Puritans
- Released: 22 March 2019
- Length: 40:09
- Label: Infectious
- Producer: Jack Barnett and George Barnett

These New Puritans chronology
Field of Reeds (2013)	Inside the Rose (2019)	Crooked Wing (2025)

Professional ratings
Aggregate scores
Source	Rating
AnyDecentMusic?	7.4/10
Metacritic	74/100
Review scores
Source	Rating
The Guardian	4/5 stars
The Line of Best Fit	9/10 stars
Clash	7/10
Pitchfork	7.8/10
The Times	4/5 stars
MusicOMH	5/5 stars
Evening Standard	5/5 stars
NME	2/5 stars
Drowned in Sound	7/10
The Skinny	4/5 stars
Under the Radar	8/10 stars
Q Magazine	4/5 stars

Inside the Rose is the fourth studio album by art rock band These New Puritans.

It was described as "another creative reinvention" and "a visionary record". The Quietus named it the fifth best album of 2019.

== Background and recording ==
Following Field of Reeds, TNP moved to Berlin and set up in a dilapidated GDR broadcasting studio in the industrial suburbs.

The album was recorded in Essex, London and Berlin, and mixed in Los Angeles. It was their first to be entirely self-produced, and was described as "another creative reinvention". The rhythm tracks were recorded with frequent collaborator Graham Sutton, of Bark Psychosis. Prior to the recording of the album, founder-member Thomas Hein left TNP to pursue work in computational neuroscience.

Sonically Jack Barnett said that he "wanted all extremes of our sound... to exist simultaneously". The results have been described as sounding like "dance innovator Jlin deconstructing a Depeche Mode anthem scored by Steve Reich".

The album features vocal appearances by David Tibet of Current 93, Taiwanese singer Scintii and Elisa Rodrigues. Chino Moreno was reportedly asked to sing on the album, but due to touring commitments, this never happened.

Much of the album was written in Westcliff-on-Sea. Jack said he found the strange characters he encountered in the town inspiring. TNP have said that while Field of Reeds was akin to a solo album for Jack, Inside The Rose has more of George's imprint on the sound; it is the first album for which he contributed lyrics. The song "Where The Trees Are On Fire" reportedly came to Jack in a dream; he dreamed the melody and most of the words, before adding the chords the next morning. The song was performed live at the Barbican Centre in 2014.

The band have said that during the making of the album, they took inspiration from their idols such as Captain Beefheart, Francis Bacon, Igor Stravinsky and Leos Carax.

== Release and reception ==
The album's release was marked with a "happening" event at the Institute of Contemporary Arts, involving a stage set constructed out of slashed silk and scaffolding, designed by George Barnett and artist Freya Don. The support act was performance artist Soojin Chang.

The album was released digitally and physically, with photography by Harley Weir and design by George Barnett. The physical formats were 12" record (with acidic multi-colour vinyl) and on CD with unorthodox artwork printed on a transparent plastic sleeve and a half-size booklet. Weir also collaborated with Barnett on a gender-blurring erotic video for lead-single "Inside The Rose".

The album received a positive critical response. TNP's willingness to take risks and sense of musical adventure was praised, and the Guardian described it as part of a "painstaking musical quest that pays zero interest to commercial expectations". Q Magazine described the band as one of the most daring and ambitious of the decade, and said they continue to turn modern rock inside out.

On the other hand, DIY magazine criticised the album as impenetrable and "too clever for its own good".

== Themes ==
The album was described as "a visionary record, rich with fire, energy, elements, the sky, and invocations". Other themes running through the album include dreams, environmental destruction, oblivion and ecstasy.

== Track listing ==
No.	Title	Length
1.	"Infinity Vibraphones"	6:32
2.	"Anti-Gravity"	4:37
3.	"Beyond Black Suns"	4:40
4.	"Inside the Rose"	4:57
5.	"Where the Trees Are on Fire"	4:39
6.	"Into the Fire"	3:43
7.	"Lost Angel"	1:14
8.	"A-R-P"	6:28
9.	"Six"	3:11
Total length:		40:09

== Personnel ==
=== These New Puritans ===
- Jack Barnett: pianos (acoustic, electric and prepared), basses (electric and upright), pitched percussion (vibraphone, crotales, gongs), sound design, synthesizer, singing
- George Barnett: drum kits (acoustic and electric), percussion, metal, glass, electronics, singing

=== Additional musicians ===
==== Instrumentalists ====
- Thomas Hein: percussion, backing singing
- Maria Chiara Argiró: piano
- Yazz Ahmed: flugelhorn, trumpet
- Noel Langley: flugelhorn
- Azazello Satariel: pocket tuba

==== Voices ====
- David Tibet
- Scintii
- Elisa Rodrigues
- Graham Sutton
- Fred McPherson
- Thomas Hein
- Micaela Haslam
- Michelle Daly

==== Stargaze ensemble ====
- Andre de Ridder: conductor
- Mayah Kadish: violin I
- Jeffrey Bruinsma: violin I
- Daniella Strasfogel: violin I
- Biliana Voutchkova: violin II
- Emmanuelle Bernard: violin II
- Mari Sawada: violin II
- Thora Sveinsdóttir: viola
- Ildiko Ludwig: viola
- Yodfat Miron: viola
- Anna Carew: cello
- Andreas Voss: cello
- Zoé Cartier: cello
- Lisa de Boos: double bass
- Caleb Salgado: double bass
- Clara Gervais: double bass
- Romain Bly: French horn
- Samuel Stoll: French horn
- Florian Menzel: trumpet
- Damir Bacikin: trumpet
- Florian Juncker: trombone
- Till Krause: trombone
