= Field of Reeds =

Studio album by These New Puritans
- Released: 10 June 2013
- Recorded: 2012
- Studio: Studio P4 Funkhaus Nalepastraße (Berlin, Germany); Snap Studios (London, England); Modern World Studios (Tetbury, England)
- Genre: Art rock; post-rock; neoclassical
- Length: 53:00
- Label: Infectious
- Producer: Jack Barnett; Graham Sutton

These New Puritans chronology
| Hidden (2010) | Field of Reeds (2013) | Inside the Rose (2019) |

Field of Reeds is the third studio album by British art rock band These New Puritans, released on 10 June 2013 on Infectious Music. Produced by Jack Barnett and Graham Sutton, the album features prominent contributions from over thirty-eight session musicians, including jazz singer Elisa Rodrigues, and finds the band "reinventing themselves as a neoclassical ensemble." The album is the band's first without keyboardist Sophie Sleigh-Johnson, who departed from the band in 2012.

Released to widespread critical acclaim, Field of Reeds reached number ninety on the UK Albums Chart.

== Background and recording ==
During the recording of Field of Reeds the band worked extensively with classical musicians and singers, including two large ensembles: the Stargaze Ensemble and the Synergy Vocal Ensemble. Regarding the recording process, vocalist and multi-instrumentalist Jack Barnett noted, "We pissed off a lot of people making this album, and drove a lot of people mad. We worked long hours of the day, every day. I'm a bit of a perfectionist. Maybe some of the musicians thought, 'It's some popular music project, we can all relax, put our feet up.' But it was a big challenge."

== Release ==
On 13 June 2013 the band released a music video for the album's second track, "Fragment Two", directed by Daniel Askill. Videos were also made for "Organ Eternal" and "V (Island Song)".

== Critical reception ==
Professional ratings
Aggregate scores
| Source | Rating |
|---|---|
| AnyDecentMusic? | 7.9/10 |
| Metacritic | 82/100 |
Review scores
| Source | Rating |
| AllMusic | 4.5/5 stars |
| The Guardian | 4/5 stars |
| The Independent | 3/5 stars |
| The Irish Times | 4/5 stars |
| Mojo | 4/5 stars |
| NME | 6/10 |
| Pitchfork | 8.4/10 |
| Q | 4/5 stars |
| Record Collector | 5/5 stars |
| Uncut | 8/10 |

Field of Reeds received highly positive reviews from critics. At Metacritic, which assigns a normalised rating out of 100 to reviews from professional critics, the album received an average score of 82 based on 26 reviews, indicating "universal acclaim".

In 2016, Fact placed Field of Reeds at number 26 on its list of the best post-rock albums of all time, with staff writer Chal Ravens describing the album as "one of only a few records that could claim to be a successor of Talk Talk's majestic strand of post-rock".

== Track listing ==
All tracks are written by Jack Barnett, except where noted.

| No. | Title | Writer(s) | Length |
|---|---|---|---|
| 1. | "This Guy's in Love with You" | Burt Bacharach; Hal David | 3:02 |
| 2. | "Fragment Two" | | 4:34 |
| 3. | "The Light in Your Name" | Barnett; Michel van der Aa | 6:03 |
| 4. | "V (Island Song)" | | 9:16 |
| 5. | "Spiral" | | 6:03 |
| 6. | "Organ Eternal" | | 5:31 |
| 7. | "Nothing Else" | | 7:49 |
| 8. | "Dream" | | 4:14 |
| 9. | "Field of Reeds" | | 6:28 |
| Total length: | | | 53:00 |

== Personnel ==
=== These New Puritans ===
- Jack Barnett – vocals, piano, electric piano, organs, bass guitar, vibraphone, chromatic gongs, unpitched percussion, magnetic resonator piano, sound design, field recordings
- George Barnett – drums, percussion, glass
- Thomas Hein – bass guitar, roto-toms

=== Additional musicians ===
Singers

- Elisa Rodrigues – vocals
- Adrian Peacock – basso profondo
- Elizabeth Turner – field recording vocal

Soloists

- Nicholas Ellis – clarinet and bass clarinet soloist
- Henry Lowther – flugelhorn and trumpet soloist
- Lindsay Kempley – French horn soloist
- Daniel West – tenor trombone and bass trombone soloist
- Pete Smith – tuba soloist
- Elspeth Hanson – viola soloist
- Chris Laurence – double bass soloist
- Toby Kearney – vibraphone soloist
- Faith Leadbetter – piano and electric piano soloist

Stargaze Ensemble

- Andre de Ridder – conductor
- Nikolaus Neuser – flugelhorn, trumpet
- Matthias Gödeker – French horn I
- Stefan Most – French horn II
- Florian Juncker – tenor trombone
- Till Krause – bass trombone
- Sebastian Kunzke – tuba
- Paul Valikoski – violin I
- Daniella Strasfogel – violin II
- Justin Caullet – viola
- Zoe Cartier – violoncello
- Kristjan Orii Sigerleifsson – double bass

Synergy Vocal Ensemble

- Micaela Haslam – director, soprano
- Julia Wilson-James – soprano
- Heather Cairncross – alto
- Rachel Weston – alto
- Phillip Brown – tenor
- Andrew Busher – tenor

Children of St Mary's Church of England Primary School

- Charlie Dyer
- Daisy Farthing
- Maddie Farthing
- Amber Motti
- James Norris
- Jacob Scotford
- Bethany Scriven

Others

- Ben McLusky – additional pipe organ
- Andrew McPherson – magnetic resonator piano setup and calibration
- Shiloh – hawk
- Alan Vaughan – hawk handler
- Roy at TGM Glazing – glazier
- Stool Trinovante – saxocone

=== Recording personnel ===
- Graham Paul Sutton – producer
- Jack Barnett – producer
- Phill Brown – recording engineer (ensemble recordings)
- Ben McLusky – assistant engineer
- Christian Bader – assistant engineer
- Campbell Duncan – assistant engineer
- Geoff Swan – assistant engineer
- Mark "Spike" Stent – mixing
- Stuart Hawkes – mastering

=== Artwork ===
- George Barnett – artwork, other photography
- Matthew Cooper – artwork
- Paul Steet – artwork assistant
- Jack Barnett – drawings
- Willy Vanderperre – band photography

== Charts ==
| Chart (2013) | Peak position |
|---|---|
| Belgian Albums (Ultratop Flanders) | 76 |
| Belgian Albums (Ultratop Wallonia) | 168 |
| UK Albums (OCC) | 90 |
| UK Independent Albums (OCC) | 17 |
