= Boymerang =

Boymerang was the drum and bass project of the English post-rock musician Graham Sutton.

== Formation ==
Following the release of the Bark Psychosis album Hex in 1994, Sutton became interested in drum and bass. He began buying Jungle records at the Lucky Spin record shop in North London and going to Islington's Paradise Club.

One of the final Bark Psychosis performances, at the 1994 Phoenix Festival was Sutton and fellow band member Daniel Gish playing drum and bass. Sutton stated that he felt invigorated by the drum and bass scene after the grueling and insular band experience of Hex. "I never thought I'd want to feel part of something," he said in 1996. "I've thrived on being outside anything that was happening. The whole scene is the most exciting thing that this country's seen since punk."

Boymerang's self-titled debut EP, from early 1995, was the first release on the Leaf label. Sutton has said this EP was a version of the set from the Phoenix festival.

== Balance of the Force ==
Released in 1997 on the Regal label (and on the Astralwerks label in the US), the album Balance of the Force received positive reviews. Melody Maker called it "the sonic equivalent of an alert, shrewd, quick, sensitive mind". Spin praised the album in an overview of the Astralwerks label, picking it as one of the label's twenty key releases, and stating it "took drum 'n' bass to evil new extremes, wrapping pulverized breakbeats in dank, industrial drones and employing bowel-stirring bass lines to unmistakably dystopian effect."

== End of project ==
By the close of the 1990s, Sutton was losing interest in drum and bass. "It had become this bad techno," he said in 2017, "and I just couldn't feel enthusiastic about it anymore." Contracted to Parlophone for a new Boymerang album, Sutton instead made the second Bark Psychosis record, Codename: Dustsucker.

== Discography ==
=== Albums ===
- Balance of the Force (1997)

=== Singles and EPs ===
- Boymerang EP (1995)
- Pro-Activ EP (1995)
- "Still" / "Urban Space" (1996)
- "Soul Beat Runna" / "Mind Control" (1997)
