= Birthmarks (Bambara album) =

Studio album by Bambara
- Released: March 14, 2025
- Genres: Post-punk; gothic rock
- Length: 36:35
- Labels: Bella Union; Wharf Cat
- Producers: Graham Sutton and Bambara

Bambara chronology
Love on My Mind (2022)	Birthmarks (2025)

Birthmarks is the fifth studio album by American post-punk band Bambara. It was released on March 14, 2025, by Bella Union and Wharf Cat Records. Produced by Graham Sutton, Birthmarks is the band's first release since its 2022 EP Love On My Mind, and its first full-length album Stray in 2020.

== Reception ==
Professional ratings
Review scores
Source	Rating
AllMusic	3.5/5 stars
Louder Than War	4.5/5 stars
DIY	3/5 stars

AllMusic gave the album a rating of 3.5 out of five and stated "there is more of a conceptual storyline to this album, involving a character named Elena and the man who murdered her boyfriend."

Louder Than War referred to it as "possibly their most accessible album to date, full of gothic post punk drama from the Bateh brothers," and assigned it a rating of 4.5 out of five, while DIY Magazine rated it three stars, noting "much of Birthmarks instead appears confusing, unable to find its groove. In essence, not one for those who actively avoid spoilers, perhaps."

The Quietus described the album as "a collection of speak-sing story-songs that has both a commercial sheen and an underlying eeriness," and BrooklynVegan remarked "Whoever is responsible for this sonic renovation, huzzah, because Birthmarks sounds like a million bucks in all the right ways and the band's essential Bambara-ness never gets lost in the gloss."

== Track listing ==
Birthmarks track listing
No.	Title	Length
1.	"Hiss"	4:15
2.	"Letters From Sing Sing"	3:14
3.	"Face Of Love"	4:15
4.	"Pray To Me"	3:29
5.	"Holy Bones"	3:27
6.	"Elena's Dream"	2:08
7.	"Because You Asked"	4:23
8.	"Dive Shrine"	3:04
9.	"Smoke"	3:59
10.	"Loretta"	4:21
Total length:		36:35

== Personnel ==
Credits for Birthmarks adapted from Bandcamp.

- Graham Sutton – producer, mixer, engineer, keys, rhodes and organ
- Bambara – producer
- William Brookshire – engineer, bass, piano and synth
- Alex Zhu – engineer
- Mike Collins – additional engineer
- Conor Stanfield – additional engineer, conors
- Risa Elledge – additional engineer
- Bria Salmena – additional engineer, vocals on "Because You Asked"
- Emma Acs – additional engineer, vocals on "Hiss"
- Madeline Johnston – additional engineer, vocals on "Face of Love" and "Elena's Dream"
- Cory Bracken – additional engineer, vibraphone
- Matt Colton – mastering
- Reid Bateh – vocals, guitar, piano and noise
- Blaze Bateh – drums, percussion and organ
- Jeff Tobias – alto saxophone
- Elisabeth Fuchsia – viola and violin
- Jummy Aremu – vocals on "Pray to Me"
- Jen Monroe – vocals on "Face of Love"
- Sean Smith – trumpet
- Marilu Donovan – harp
- Guarionex Rodriguez Jr. – album photography
- Art Belikov – graphic design
