= Hex (Bark Psychosis album) =

Studio album by Bark Psychosis
- Released: 14 February 1994
- Recorded: March–November 1993
- Genres: Post-rock; ambient
- Length: 51:19
- Label: Circa
- Producer: Bark Psychosis

Bark Psychosis chronology
Hex (1994)	///Codename: Dustsucker (2004)

Singles from Hex
- 1. "A Street Scene" Released: 10 January 1994

Hex is the debut studio album by English post-rock band Bark Psychosis. It was recorded in St John's Church, Stratford, and released on 14 February 1994 by Circa Records in the United Kingdom and on 11 March 1994 by Caroline Records in the United States. The term "post-rock" was coined by music journalist Simon Reynolds in his review of the album for Mojo magazine.

== Reception ==
Professional ratings
Review scores
Source	Rating
AllMusic	5/5 stars
Mojo	4/5 stars
NME	8/10
Pitchfork	9.0/10
Record Collector	4/5 stars
Select	4/5
Uncut	10/10

Reception to Hex was generally positive. Melody Maker described Hex as "the work of a band nourished by constant evolution and is unquestionably divine" and "a gorgeously intense 50 minutes". The NME referred to the band as "nothing less than completely captivating" and called the album "a thoroughly marvelous record".

Writing about Hex for its 30th anniversary, Mark Lager, in Under the Radar, described Hex as "an aptly named album as it casts a spellbinding hypnosis on the listener. Hex could be considered ahead of its time but more accurately it still sounds lost out of time. It followed in the footsteps of Talk Talk’s Spirit of Eden and The Verve’s A Storm in Heaven and is one of the most experimental records of the 1990s. Hex is a melancholy and wintry song cycle, deeply textured and cinematic, for those lonely moments in the middle of the night."

A remastered version of the album was released in 2017.

== Track listing ==
All tracks are written by Bark Psychosis, except where noted.

Hex track listing
No.	Title	Writer(s)	Length
1.	"The Loom"		5:16
2.	"A Street Scene"		5:36
3.	"Absent Friend"		8:20
4.	"Big Shot"	Graham Sutton; John Ling; Mark Simnett	5:21
5.	"Fingerspit"		8:21
6.	"Eyes & Smiles"		8:31
7.	"Pendulum Man"		9:54
Total length:			51:19

== Personnel ==
Bark Psychosis

- Graham Sutton – vocals, samples and programming, guitar, piano, melodica, Hammond
- John Ling – bass, samples and programming, percussion
- Mark Simnett – drums, percussion
- Daniel Gish – keyboards, piano, Hammond

Other Musicians

- Neil Aldridge – triangle, programming
- Pete Beresford – vibraphone
- Phil Brown – flute
- Del Crabtree – trumpet
- Dave Ross – djembe
- The Duke Quartet:
  - Louisa Fuller – violin
  - Rick Coster – violin
  - John Metcalfe – viola
  - Ivan McCready – cello

Technical personnel

- Bark Psychosis – mixing, engineering
- Roy Spong – mixing
- Nick Wollage – engineering
- Mog – engineering
- Darren Westbrook – engineering
- Pete Molyneux – assistance
- Henry Binns – assistance
- Lee Harris – assistance
- Chris Blair – mastering

== Charts ==
Chart performance for Hex
Chart (2017)	Peak position
UK Independent Albums (Official Charts)	48
