= Now Pluvial =

EP by These New Puritans
- Released: October 2006
- Genre: Post-punk, electronica
- Length: 8:39
- Label: Angular
- Producer: Jack Barnett

These New Puritans chronology
Now Pluvial (2006)	Beat Pyramid (2008)

Professional ratings
Review scores
Source	Rating
Drowned in Sound	(9/10)

Now Pluvial is an EP released in October 2006 by the British band These New Puritans. It was released on Angular Records and the catalogue number is ARC016. The EP was a self distributed limited edition of 500 numbered copies.

== Track listing ==
1. "Elvis" – 2:46
2. "C16th" – 1:38
3. "En Papier" – 4:55
