= Codename: Dustsucker =

2004 album by Bark Psychosis

///Codename: Dustsucker

Studio album by Bark Psychosis
- Released: 28 July 2004
- Recorded: 1999–2004
- Studio: DustSuckerSound in London
- Genre: Post-rock
- Length: 50:24
- Label: Fire
- Producer: Graham Sutton

Bark Psychosis chronology
Hex (1994)	///Codename: Dustsucker (2004)

Codename: Dustsucker, stylised as ///CODENAME: dustsucker, is the second studio album by English post-rock band Bark Psychosis. It was released on 28 July 2004 on Fire Records. The album was recorded at DustSuckerSound, a private studio run by Bark Psychosis member Graham Sutton in east London, between 1999 and 2004. It notably features the contributions of Lee Harris, the drummer and percussionist of early post-rock purveyors Talk Talk.

"400 Winters", along with remixes of three of the album's other tracks, was released as an EP titled "400 Winters" in 2005.

== Composition ==
The band continues to use conventional rock instruments in songs that are structured unconventionally, as they did in their earlier releases. Rather than the familiar alternation of verse and chorus, the songs mostly develop as a succession of related sections. "400 Winters" has an intro, a verse, a long chorus-like section, then the rhythm and arrangement change for a long coda section, which fades to be replaced by a chord sequence on piano and what appears to be a distorted answerphone message. "Shapeshifting" follows a similar structure. "Burning the City" is based around a three bar pattern, in contrast to rock's usual 4, 8 or 12 bar structures.

== Critical reception ==
Professional ratings
Review scores
Source	Rating
AllMusic	4.5/5 stars
The Encyclopedia of Popular Music	4/5 stars
Mojo	4/5 stars
Pitchfork	7.7/10
Stylus Magazine	A
Uncut	4/5 stars

The album has received generally positive reviews. A contemporary review in the American music magazine CMJ compared the band and album's sound to fellow English compatriots Elbow and Doves, and positively wrote that listeners "may have to scour the import bins for this one, but you'll thank us for the heads up." In an October 2004 review by Sam Ubl for Pitchfork, the album's sound is described as "utterly unique," with Ubl also writing that "what the songs lack in structural certainty or melodic eloquence they usually make up for in the remarkable depth and vibrancy of their textures." In December 2004, American webzine Somewhere Cold ranked Codename: Dustsucker No. 1 on their 2004 Somewhere Cold Awards Hall of Fame list.

== Track listing ==
No.	Title	Writer(s)	Length
1.	"From What Is Said to When It's Read"	Graham Sutton; Colin Bradley	5:27
2.	"The Black Meat"	Sutton; Rachel Dreyer	6:50
3.	"Miss Abuse"	Sutton; Lee Harris	6:11
4.	"400 Winters"	Sutton; Anja Buechele	5:48
5.	"Dr. Innocuous / Ketamoid"	Sutton	1:04
6.	"Burning the City"	Sutton; Dreyer	5:11
7.	"INQB8TR"	Sutton; Harris	8:00
8.	"Shapeshifting"	Sutton; Dreyer	6:03
9.	"Rose"	Sutton	5:50
Total length:			50:24

Note:

- Track 5 is alternatively written as "Dr. Innocuous-Ketamoid" on a few releases, such as on Spotify and a promo CDr issued by Fire Records in 2018.

== Personnel ==
Musicians

- Graham Sutton – guitar, bass guitar, piano, keyboards, melodica, E-mu Emulator, vocals (1, 2, 3, 6, 7)
- Lee Harris – drums, percussion
- Colin Bradley – guitar
- Pete Beresford – vibraphone
- Rachel Dreyer – piano, vocals (8)
- T. J. Mackenzie – trumpet
- Anja Buechele – vocals (4, 6)
- Chicken – gonk vocal
- Neil Aldridge – indicators
- Shaun Hyder – Sindhi tamboura
- David Panos – bass guitar
- Alice Kemp – bowed guitar
- Silke Roch – vocals (9)
- Mark Simnett – found drums
- Del Crabtree – found trumpet

Technical personnel

- Graham Sutton – engineering, production, mastering
- Noel Summerville – mastering
