= Insides (band) =

English post-rock group

- Origin: Hove, East Sussex, England
- Genres: Post-rock; dream pop; ambient pop; indietronica
- Years active: 1992–2000, 2016–present
- Labels: La-Di-Da; 4AD; Third Stone
- Members: Kirsty Yates; Julian Tardo

Insides are an English post-rock duo, consisting of members Kirsty Yates (vocals and bass) and Julian Tardo (guitar and programming).

Following the disbandment of their previous band Earwig (not the American band of the same name), Yates and Tardo formed Insides in 1992 and released their debut album, Euphoria, on the 4AD imprint Guernica in November 1993. Euphoria was met with critical acclaim, including being named as one of the year's best albums by Melody Maker. Insides departed 4AD following the release of their second album Clear Skin in 1994 and released their third album Sweet Tip in 2000 on Third Stone Records. The duo disbanded following the album's release and remained inactive for the remainder of the decade.

In a 2011 interview, Tardo indicated that he and Yates were interested in recording new Insides music. The duo returned in July 2016 with the release of a new song, "Ghost Music".

In 2021, Insides issued their first album for two decades when Soft Bonds was released.

== Discography ==
=== Albums as Earwig ===
- Under My Skin I Am Laughing (1992)

=== Albums as Insides ===
- Euphoria (1993)
- Clear Skin (1994)
- Sweet Tip (2000)
- Soft Bonds (2021)
