= These New Puritans =

English art rock band

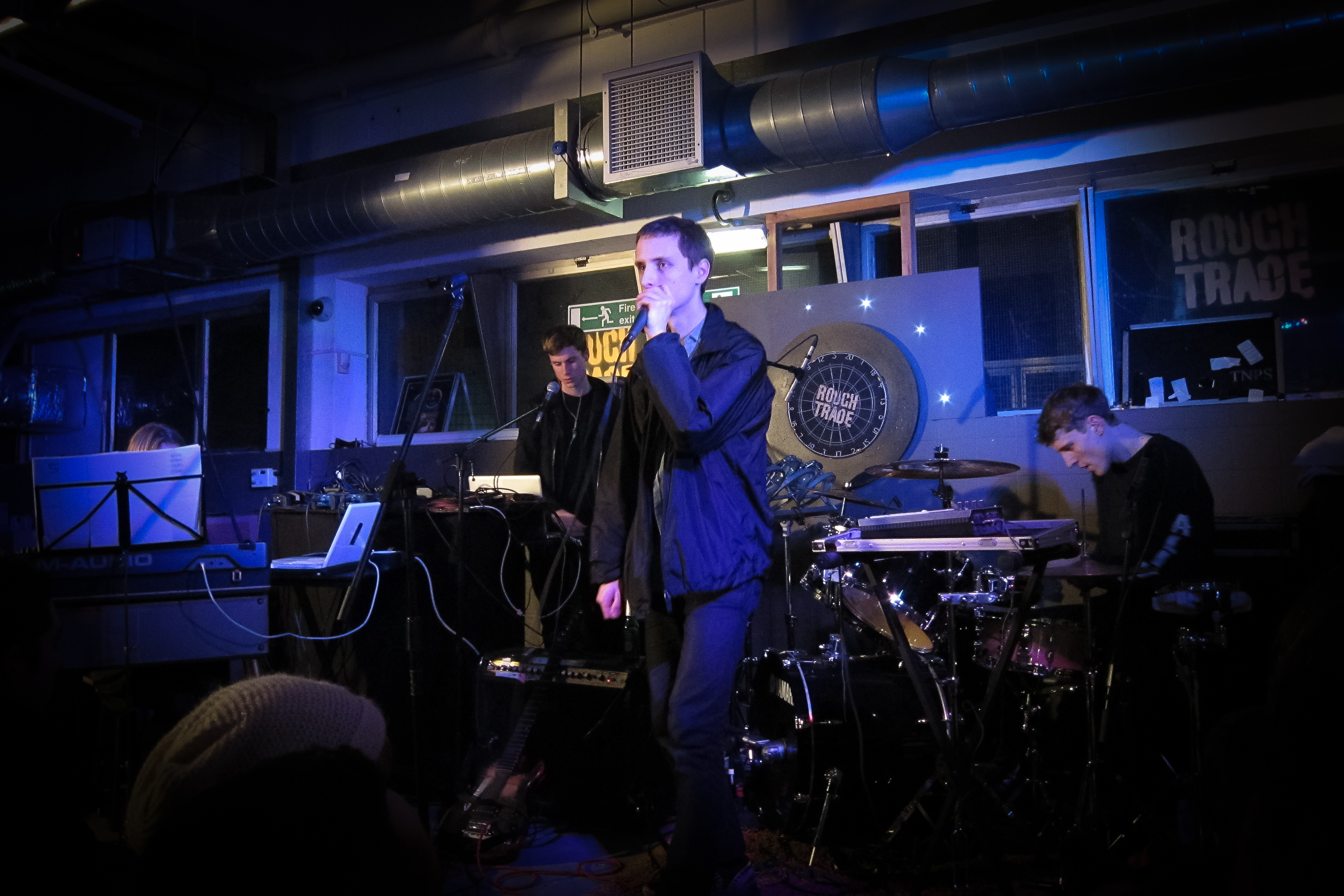
- These New Puritans at Rough Trade East in 2010

Background information
- Origin: Southend-on-Sea, England
- Genres: Art rock, neo-classical music, electronic music, experimental, post-rock, post-punk
- Years active: 2006–present
- Labels: Infectious Music; Angular; Domino
- Members: Jack Barnett; George Barnett
- Past members: Thomas Hein (2006–2016); Sophie Sleigh-Johnson (2006–2010); Elisa Rodrigues (2012–2015)
- Website: www.thesenewpuritans.com

These New Puritans are an English art rock band from Southend-on-Sea, England. It consists mainly of Jack Barnett (principal songwriter, vocalist, producer, multi-instrumentalist) and his twin brother George Barnett (drums, electronics, producer, artwork). Multi-instrumentalist Thomas Hein was an active member of TNP between 2006 and 2016; keyboardist Sophie Sleigh-Johnson was active between 2006 and 2010. Portuguese fado and jazz singer Elisa Rodrigues joined as a vocalist between 2012 and 2015. They have recorded five studio albums: Beat Pyramid (2008), Hidden (2010), Field of Reeds (2013), Inside the Rose (2019) and Crooked Wing (2025).

The band's music has been described as "blurring the distinction between rock, classical, electronic and experimental" and as "strikingly modern yet simultaneously timeless."

== History ==
=== Formation and early years ===
The Barnett brothers grew up in the Essex town of Southend-on-Sea. Their father was a builder and their mother was an art teacher. George and Jack made music together as children with "karaoke microphones, old bongos and guitars too large for their tiny hands", later focusing on electronic music under the name Mick the Asbestos. They formed the band together with childhood friend Tom Hein, who grew up in nearby Billericay.

In a 2008 interview, Jack Barnett said that hip hop acts Wu-Tang Clan, especially member RZA, Timbaland and J Dilla influenced the first album Beat Pyramid. Barnett also stated that his inspirations included the electronic music of Aphex Twin and the cartoon series The Smurfs, though he later suggested this was not serious.

TNP have been described as "falling in the tradition of British outliers that also includes Robert Wyatt, Talk Talk, Bark Psychosis and Scott Walker." Although unusual for a rock group, the band often incorporates the same section of music into different songs as refrains.

=== Hidden ===
Before their second album Hidden was released, Barnett revealed that he had been writing music for bassoon and stated that the aim was for a final product where "dancehall meets Steve Reich". He taught himself musical notation to score the brass and woodwind elements of the album. In a 2010 interview with Jack Barnett, Paul Morley described These New Puritans' new material on Hidden as "very 1970, but also quite 1610, 1950, 1979, 1989, 2005 and 2070". When performing live during the Hidden era they were often accompanied by a five-piece brass-woodwind ensemble. In 2010, they performed a series of full live performances of Hidden (featuring a brass-woodwind ensemble, Taiko drums, children's choir, three vibraphonists and live Foley techniques) entitled Hidden Live, at venues such as the Barbican Centre (featuring the Britten Sinfonia), the Pompidou Centre and Berghain. In 2010, the song "We Want War" featured on the Assassin's Creed Brotherhood soundtrack.

In October 2020, the band announced a reissue of the album titled Hidden [MMXX] out 4 December via Domino, which included unreleased songs from the original recording sessions as well as two live recordings. The release was made available on vinyl.

=== Field of Reeds ===
In a May 2010 interview with C.B.Liddell, Jack Barnett revealed that he was interested in Melanesian music and that he anticipated that the next TNPS album would be "quieter." Towards the end of 2012 the band remixed "Mutual Core" by Björk, which featured on the remix album Bastards. In June 2013, they released their third album, Field of Reeds, which featured jazz singer Elisa Rodrigues. The video clip for the single Organ Eternal was directed by Willy Vanderperre and featured the acclaimed Belgian actress Line Pillet. Musically Field of Reeds was described as "uncategorizable" and as drawing heavily on avant-garde classical composition. For the "Fragment Two" video, they reunited with Daniel Askill, who'd previously directed "We Want War".

Following Field of Reeds, TNP moved to Berlin and set up in a dilapidated old Soviet broadcasting studio in the industrial suburbs. In 2015 Jack collaborated in the studio with Robert Del Naja of Massive Attack.

=== Inside the Rose ===
These New Puritans returned in November 2018 with the song, "Into the Fire", which was released digitally and as a limited edition flame-coloured 7" single. This was followed in January 2019 by an erotic, gender-blurring video for "Inside the Rose", made in collaboration with photographer Harley Weir, and the announcement of a new album of the same name. Recorded in Essex, London and Berlin, and mixed in Los Angeles, Inside the Rose was described as "another creative reinvention" and as their most direct and accessible music yet. The album's release was marked with a "happening" event at the Institute of Contemporary Arts, involving a stage set constructed out of slashed silk hung from scaffolding, designed by George Barnett and artist Freya Don. The support act was performance artist Soojin Chang.

After the release of Inside the Rose it was announced that Thomas Hein had departed the group, due to his academic commitments in studying computational neuroscience.

In February 2020, they released The Cut (2016–2019), a so-called 'sister album' to Inside the Rose, containing new music begun during the album sessions, orchestral interludes and reworkings, and remixes. It was made available via a limited edition CD, each copy containing hand-cut silk artwork.

This was followed by The Blue Door, their third performance at the Barbican Centre in London, which featured large-scale video projections and two scaffold-tower installations draped in gauze, with a band augmented by sopranos, brass, percussion and special guests.

In May 2020 during the COVID-19 epidemic, TNP produced two Jigsaw puzzles in collaboration with Harley Weir. All profits from the project were donated to the National Health Service. Once completed, the puzzles displayed codewords which led to a download of a new 4-track EP.

=== Crooked Wing ===
On 11 March 2025, the band announced their fifth studio album would be released on 23 May 2025 via Domino Recording Company. Two tracks, "Industrial Love Song" (featuring Caroline Polachek) and "Bells", accompanied the announcement. A video for "Industrial Love Song", directed by longtime collaborator Harley Weir, was also released. The album has been widely acclaimed.

The band's fifth studio album, Crooked Wing, was released on 23 May 2025 via Domino.

== Projects ==
TNPS worked with designer Hedi Slimane and recorded the song "Navigate, Navigate" for the Dior Homme Hiver 2007 show. Both the music and the collection received positive reviews. The band members also took part in an art/dance performance at the Palais de Tokyo in Paris for the after-show of the Stage of the Art. In 2013, Jack Barnett contributed to the Current 93 album I Am the Last of All the Field That Fell: A Channel alongside Nick Cave and Anohni. The next year, TNP soundtracked the first authorised theatrical production of Aldous Huxley's novel Brave New World. In 2017, they were commissioned to write a piece to mark the 70th anniversary of Indian independence from the British Empire. The band collaborated again with Hedi Slimane for the launch of the new Celine campaign in February 2021, with music released under the artist name THE LOOM soundtracking the brand's new collection launch.

== Discography ==
=== Studio albums ===
- Beat Pyramid (2008) No. 188 UK
- Hidden (2010) No. 100 UK; No. 10 UK Indie
- Field of Reeds (2013) No. 90 UK; No. 17 UK Indie
- Inside the Rose (2019)
- Crooked Wing (2025)

=== Live albums ===
- EXPANDED (Live at the Barbican) (2014)

=== Compilation albums ===
- The Cut (2016–2019) (2020)

=== Singles and EPs ===
- "Now Pluvial" (30 October 2006) – 7"
- "Navigate, Navigate" (21 May 2007) – 12"/Digital download
- "Numbers"/"Colours" (5 November 2007) – 7"
- "Elvis" (21 January 2008) – 7"/CD
- "Swords of Truth" (5 May 2008) – 7"/12"/Digital Download
- "We Want War" (11 January 2010) – 10"/Digital Download
- "Attack Music" (12 April 2010) – Digital Download
- "Hologram" (26 July 2010)
- "White Chords" (2010)
- "Fragment Two" (2013) – CD, Single, Promo
- "Organ Eternal" (2013) – CD, Single, Promo
- "V (Island Song)" (2013) – CD, Single, Promo
- "Magnetic Field" (2013) – 12", Ltd, Num
- "Into the Fire" (2018) - 7"

=== Music videos ===
- Elvis (2008)
- Swords of Truth (2008)
- We Want War (2010)
- Attack Music (2010)
- Hologram (2010)
- Fragment Two (2012)
- Organ Eternal (2013)
- V (Island Song) (2013)
- Inside the Rose (2019)
- Where the Trees Are on Fire (2019)
- Six (2019)
- Beyond Black Suns (2019)
- Industrial Love Song (2025)

=== Contributions to other works ===
These New Puritans have contributed songs to the following CD compilations:

- "Chamber" – Digital Penetration (September 2006)
- "I Want to Be Tracey Emin" – Future Love Songs (December 2006)
- "Elvis" (demo) – Dance Floor Distortion (December 2006)
- "Colours" – 2000 Trees: Cider Smiles Vol. 1 (Hide and Seek Records, June 2008)
- Music from Aldous Huxley's Brave New World – Incidental: Music for the Stage (Filmtrax, October 2021)
