= Sam Zalta =

American musician and performance artist

- Origin: Brooklyn, New York, U.S.
- Genres: Baroque pop, Dream Pop, Space Rock
- Occupations: Musician; singer-songwriter; performance artist
- Instruments: Vocals; guitar; keyboards
- Years active: 2011–present
- Member of: Bambara

Sam Zalta is an American singer-songwriter, multi-instrumentalist, and performance artist from Brooklyn, New York. He is best known for his work as a long-term touring member of the post-punk band Bambara and for his solo recording career, which includes work under the moniker Nola Gras.

== Career ==
=== Early years and Nola Gras (2011–2019) ===
Zalta's earliest documented work dates back to 2011, with a recorded performance at The New School for the "Experiments in Punk Pedagogy" series, featuring a 20-minute rendition of "Suicide" by Spacemen 3.

In 2014, Zalta began recording under the project name Nola Gras, experimenting with various unreleased recordings before publishing his first major works online. In 2015, he released the double EP Living in Darkness / Under the Covers, which was premiered by Tiny Mix Tapes. That same year, he released the full-length album Paraiso Terrenal.

His subsequent 2017 album, o (Like St. Joan), was recorded in a single day and featured members of the band Bambara as his backing ensemble. In 2019, Zalta released It All Ends the Same, an album co-produced and recorded by Ben Jones of the project Constant Smiles.

=== Bambara and solo work (2016–present) ===
In 2016, Zalta joined the Brooklyn-based band Bambara as a touring multi-instrumentalist. Performing on guitar and keyboards, Zalta became a consistent fixture of the band's live lineup during several major international touring cycles. During his tenure, the band toured extensively across North America and Europe, supporting high-profile acts including Foo Fighters, IDLES, Daughters, Gilla Band, METZ, and Algiers.

In 2023, Zalta transitioned to releasing music under his own name with the album Memento Mori. The record marked a shift toward baroque pop and cinematic arrangements influenced by 1960s pop music. The album received positive critical attention for its lush instrumentation and existential lyrical themes from outlets including BrooklynVegan, Living Life Fearless, and Motel Void.

== Discography ==
Studio albums

- Paraiso Terrenal (2015) (as Nola Gras)
- o (Like St. Joan) (2017) (as Nola Gras)
- It All Ends the Same (2019) (as Nola Gras)
- Memento Mori (2023)
