= Polyhymnia (album) =

Studio album by Yazz Ahmed
- Released: 11 October 2019
- Recorded: August 2016–2019
- Studio: Session Corner (Luton); Valby Station (Copenhagen); Virkeligheden Studio (Copenhagen); Snap Studios (London); Tatami Studios
- Genre: Jazz
- Length: 56:59
- Label: Ropeadope
- Producer: Noel Langley; Yazz Ahmed

Yazz Ahmed chronology
La Saboteuse Remixed (2018)	Polyhymnia (2019)

Polyhymnia is the third studio album by British-Bahraini musician Yazz Ahmed. It was released on 11 October 2019 through Ropeadope Records.

Described by Ahmed as a "celebration of female courage, determination and creativity", Polyhymnia is a concept album whose six tracks are all dedicated to a particular female activist or collective. The album's title refers to Polyhymnia, the ancient Greek Muse of music.

== Background ==
The material on Polyhymnia started life in 2015 as an extended piece commissioned by jazz education and artist development organization Tomorrow's Warriors. Each movement of this work was meant to correspond to an important figure in women's history. The finished album features an "evolved and expanded" version of the original work, incorporating numerous new elements and additional musicians.

== Reception ==
Polyhymnia received positive reviews from critics. DownBeat awarded the album four stars out of five, stating the album "further establishes [Ahmed] as one of the more creative new voices in jazz" after the critical success of her previous album, La Saboteuse (2017). Jazzwise included the album in their list of the best jazz albums of 2019, describing its music as "rich, sonorous, big, melodic, put[ting] a kick in your heels and a smile on your face".

== Track listing ==
All tracks composed and arranged by Yazz Ahmed.

Polyhymnia
No.	Title	Length
1.	"Lahan al-Mansour"	9:57
2.	"Ruby Bridges"	9:42
3.	"One Girl Among Many"	9:32
4.	"2857"	8:30
5.	"Deeds Not Words"	8:52
6.	"Barbara"	10:24
Total length:		56:59

Note: "One Girl Among Many" features extracts from the 2013 United Nations speech by Malala Yousafzai.
