= Soojin Chang =

Performance artist, art director, and filmmaker

Soojin Chang is a California-born, Glasgow-based performance artist and filmmaker.

Notable works include BXBY at Jerwood Space in London, Heavenly Shower of Banknotes at the ICA in London, JADE BABY BAMBOO SPINE at Bluecoat in Liverpool and South London Gallery, a heifer would be needed for the sacrifice at Tramway, Glasgow, and the State of Possession – Performance at the ICA in London which provided support for the band These New Puritans.

Chang is known for their use of shock tactics and taboo involving nudity, ethnography and violence in their works. Chang’s Jerwood Survey commission, BXBY caused institutional unrest and was censored by Leeds Art Gallery, due to its ‘sensitive content, including documentation of a deer being culled and images of cervical self-experimentation done at the artist’s home.'

== Biography ==
Chang was born in San Francisco, California and graduated from the MFA program at the Glasgow School of Art.
