= Hidden (These New Puritans album) =

HIDDEN

Studio album by These New Puritans
- Released: 18 January 2010
- Recorded: 2009 in London and Prague
- Genre: Art rock; neoclassical music
- Length: 43:02
- Label: Angular, Domino
- Producer: Jack Barnett, Graham Sutton

These New Puritans chronology
Beat Pyramid (2008)	HIDDEN (2010)	Field of Reeds (2013)

Professional ratings
Aggregate scores
Source	Rating
AnyDecentMusic?	8.0/10
Metacritic	83/100
Review scores
Source	Rating
AllMusic	4/5 stars
The A.V. Club	B
The Daily Telegraph	5/5 stars
The Guardian	5/5 stars
Mojo	4/5 stars
NME	9/10
Pitchfork	8.2/10
Q	4/5 stars
Spin	7/10
Uncut	4/5 stars

Hidden (often stylized as ĦỊĐĐỂŅ) is the second studio album by British art rock band These New Puritans. Featuring a wider sonic palette than previous work and sections played by a Czech orchestra, it was produced by frontman Jack Barnett and former Bark Psychosis leader Graham Sutton during 2009. Before their second album Hidden was released, Barnett revealed that he had been writing music for bassoon and stated that the aim was for a final product where "dancehall meets Steve Reich". Barnett learned music notation in order to write the classical parts of the album, especially the brass and woodwind audio tracks. The mixing process was undertaken by Dave Cooley, who had previously focused on alternative hip-hop and shoegaze artists, in Los Angeles using Barnett's input. Angular Recording Corporation and Domino Records released Hidden in most territories on 18 January 2010; the North American release date was 2 March. Angular's press release describes the album as including:

Six-foot Japanese Taiko drums, a thirteen piece brass and woodwind ensemble, sub-heavy beats, prepared piano, a children’s choir, Foley recording techniques (including a melon with cream crackers attached struck by a hammer, used to simulate the sound of a human head being smashed), and the ethereal voice of Heather Marlatt from dream-pop group Salem.

Hidden was voted NME album of the year for 2010.

== Legacy ==
Reflecting on "We Want War" in 2023, Tom Ewing of Freaky Trigger wrote: "A rare thing by 2010, almost extinct now – the big statement artrock single. These New Puritans were scrappy post-punkers who suddenly reinvented themselves with an extraordinary new sound – part 17th century chamber music, part dancehall, telling a story of the old unquiet ghosts of England."

== Track listing ==
All songs written by Jack Barnett, unless otherwise stated.

No.	Title	Writer(s)	Length
1.	"Time Xone"		2:07
2.	"We Want War"	Jack Barnett, Richard Rodney Bennett, John Rutter, Cambridge Singers	7:23
3.	"Three Thousand"		2:49
4.	"Hologram"		2:22
5.	"Attack Music"	Jack Barnett, Thomas Hein	4:48
6.	"Fire–Power"		3:20
7.	"Orion"		4:31
8.	"Canticle"		1:12
9.	"Drum Courts–Where Corals Lie"	Jack Barnett, Sir Edward Elgar, Richard Garnett	6:14
10.	"White Chords"		3:42
11.	"5"		4:40
Total length:			43:02

Japan edition bonus tracks
No.	Title	Length
12.	"We Want War" (Brass & Woodwind/Alternate Ending)	2:09
13.	"Hologram" (Alternative Mix)	2:03
Total length:		47:20

== Charts ==
Chart (2010)	Peak position
Belgian Albums (Ultratop Flanders)	49
Greek Albums (IFPI)	46
UK Albums (OCC)	100
UK Independent Albums (OCC)	10
