= Beat Pyramid =

Studio album by These New Puritans
- Released: 28 January 2008
- Recorded: 2007
- Studios: Miloco Studios and Metropolis Studios, London; Studio Pigalle, Paris
- Genres: Indie rock, post-punk, electronic
- Length: 33:15
- Label: Angular/Domino (joint)
- Producer: Gareth Jones

These New Puritans chronology
Beat Pyramid (2008)	Hidden (2010)

Singles from Beat Pyramid
- 1. "Numbers/Colours" Released: 5 November 2007; 2. "Elvis" Released: 21 January 2008; 3. "Swords of Truth" Released: 5 May 2008

Professional ratings
Review scores
Source	Rating
AllMusic	4/5 stars
Blender	3.5/5 stars
Drowned in Sound	(8/10)
Entertainment Weekly	B
The Observer	4/5 stars
Pitchfork	(7.5/10)
PopMatters	(8/10)
Spin	3.5/5 stars
Uncut	4/5 stars
Vice	(10/10)

Beat Pyramid is the debut studio album by British art rock band These New Puritans. It was released on 28 January 2008 in the United Kingdom through Angular and Domino and on 18 March 2008 in the United States through Domino. The album was recorded in London and Paris during 2007 and was produced by Gareth Jones in London. The double A-side "Numbers/Colours", "Elvis" and "Swords of Truth" were released as singles.

Lyricist and primary composer Jack Barnett has claimed that hip-hop group Wu-Tang Clan were among the influences for the album, along with electronic music from artists in the vein of Aphex Twin.

== Origins and recording ==
These New Puritans' first release was the extended play Now Pluvial, which was a three track long record released in October 2006 through independent record label Angular Records. Despite only being a limited release, the EP attracted good reception from Drowned in Sound, garnering a 9/10 review.

== Promotion and release ==
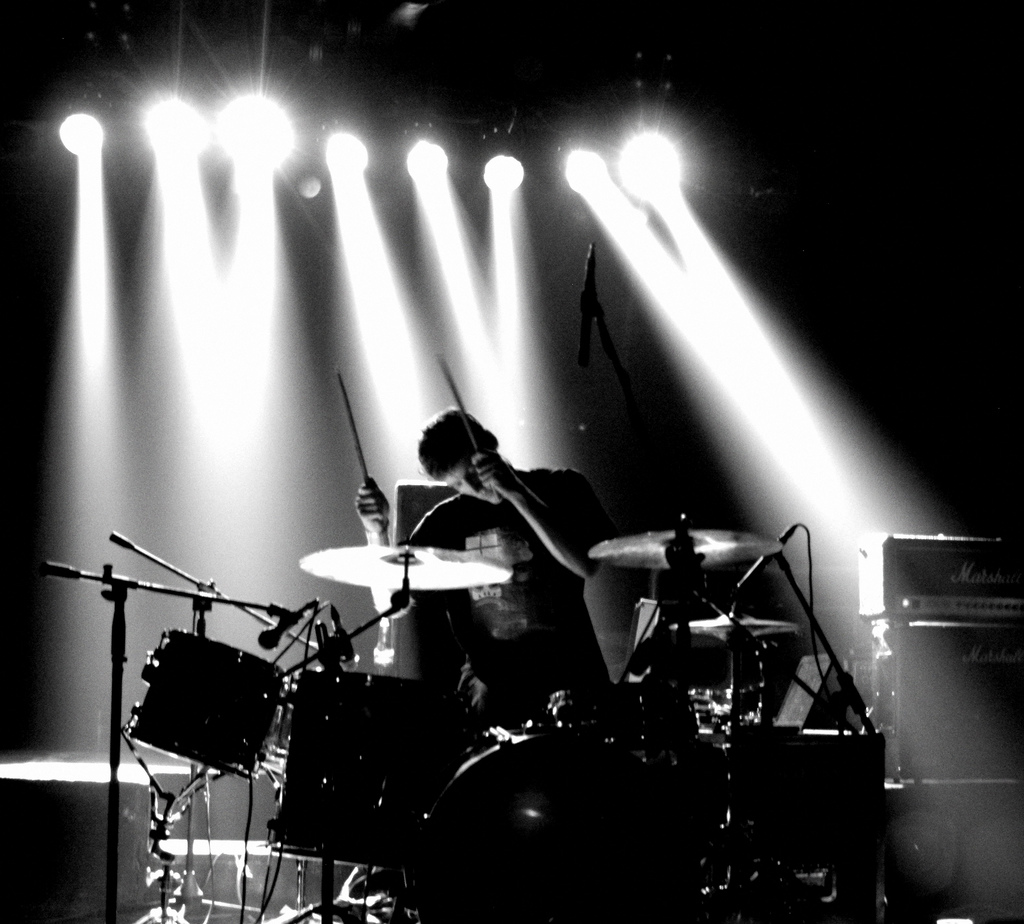
George Barnett playing drums for These New Puritans at a show in Italy

== Track listing ==
All songs written by Jack Barnett, unless otherwise stated.

No.	Title	Writer(s)	Length
1.	"...ce I Will Say This Twice"		0:16
2.	"Numerology (AKA Numbers)"		3:11
3.	"Colours"		2:26
4.	"Swords of Truth"		3:12
5.	"Doppelgänger"		1:30
6.	"C. 16th ±"		1:38
7.	"En papier"	Jack Barnett, George Barnett, Thomas Hein	4:55
8.	"Infinity ytinifnI"		2:26
9.	"Elvis"		2:46
10.	"£4"		2:43
11.	"MKK3"		2:13
12.	"4"		0:08
13.	"Navigate-Colours"	Jack Barnett, George Barnett	4:20
14.	"H."		0:28
15.	"Costume"	Jack Barnett, DB Cooper	3:36
16.	"I Will Say This Twi..."		0:08

== Personnel ==
Band

- Jack Barnett – vocals, guitar, laptop
- Thomas Hein – bass guitar, sampler, MIDI
- Sophie Sleigh-Johnson – keyboards
- George Barnett – drums, loops, contact mics

Additional musicians

- Justyna Borucka – vocals ("..ce I Will Say This Twice"; "I Will Say This Twi...")
- Killah Doku – guitar
- James Ford – guitar ("Costume"), keyboard ("Elvis")
- Thomas Jerome Seabrook – mixer, effects
- Gareth Jones – desk feedback

Production

- Gareth Jones – producer, mixing
- James Ford – tape recording ("Elvis")
- Jack Barnett – additional recording, additional editing
- DB Cooper – additional recording, additional editing
- Jeff Knowles – engineer (except "Navigate-Colours")
- Quentin Leuiller – engineer ("Navigate-Colours")
- James Aparicio – mix engineer

Artwork

- Matthew Cooper – design
- Elina Tsompanoglou – design
- George Barnett – design assistant
- Jack Barnett – design assistant
