= Bambara (band) =

American rock band

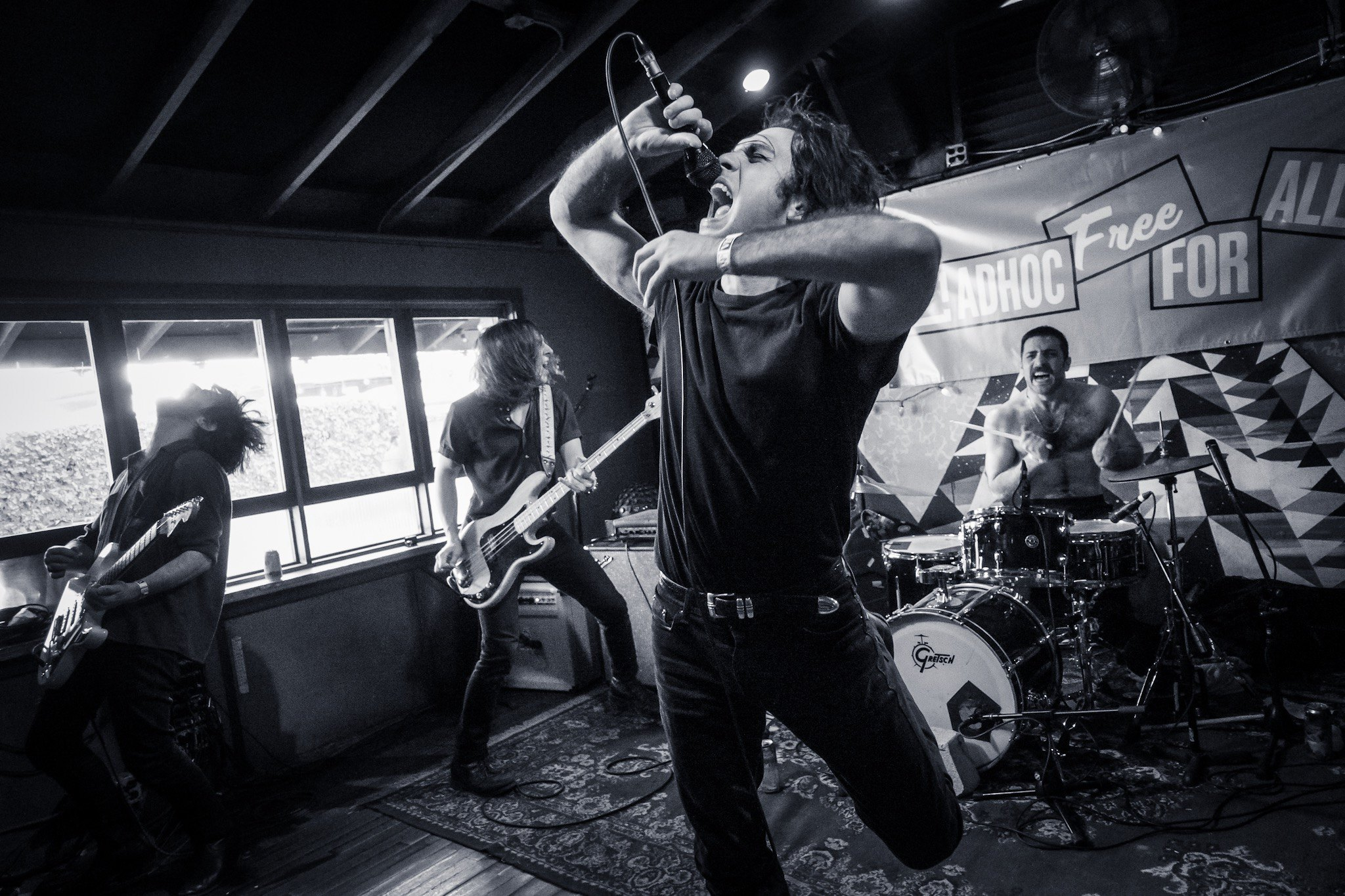
- Bambara performing at SXSW on March 14, 2019

Background information
- Origin: Athens, Georgia, United States
- Genres: Post-punk; gothic rock; punk blues; noise rock
- Years active: 2007–present
- Labels: Emerald Weapon, Arrowhawk, Wharf Cat, Bella Union
- Members: Reid Bateh; Blaze Bateh; William Brookshire
- Website: bambaranyc.com

Bambara is an American rock band formed in 2007 in Athens, Georgia, currently based in Brooklyn, New York. The trio consists of twin brothers Reid Bateh (lead vocals, guitar) and Blaze Bateh (drums), and William Brookshire (bass).

The band is named after the character of the same name from the animated television series Æon Flux. Drummer Blaze Bateh stated that "honestly there wasn’t anything in particular about him as a character that drove us to use his name. We were just huge fans of the show. I’ve watched the show start to finish countless times and I still get blown away by aspects of it. But yeah, we just thought his name sounded really cool".

Reid Bateh's baritone vocals have been compared to Nick Cave and Rowland S. Howard.

== History ==
The members of Bambara began playing with each other in 2001 in Athens, Georgia when twin brothers Reid and Blaze Bateh and school friend William Brookshire attended North Springs High School. The trio started out playing covers of bands such as Blink-182 and Red Hot Chili Peppers before developing their own sound that incorporated "funk, progressive, and a lot of Latin". They released their debut album Curtains and Cannibals in 2005 under their original name 23jinx.

In October 2007, the band changed their name and formed as Bambara. The band moved to Brooklyn, where they signed to Arrowhawk Records in 2013. They recorded the album Dreamviolence from their basement apartment before releasing it in April of that same year. Their music was labeled as noise rock in part due to their use of machines, loops, and other assorted lo-fi software.

By mid-2014, the band nearly finished their full-length LP Swarm, but had their computer stolen with all of the tracks they had recorded up until that point. This resulted in a delay for the album as the band took a break before re-recording the stolen tracks. Bambara recorded and released an experimental EP of pure noise titled Night Chimes in August 2015. The band stated that the EP helped get the noise "out of their systems" which helped in creating a more toned down version of the abrasive sounds of Swarm when the time came to re-record it. The album was released on April 1, 2016. According to Zoë Beery of The Village Voice, Swarm showcased the band's trademark atmosphere through long reverb and distorted guitars, but with clearer production to showcase the musicality as well as Reid Bateh's vocals.

Their follow up to Swarm, entitled Shadow on Everything and released through Wharf Cat Records, continued this style for the band by restraining the noise experimentation while also incorporating a Western Gothic concept. The album follows a loose story of characters reciting eerie tales to each other at a dive bar. Critical reception for the album was positive.

Following the release of Shadow on Everything in April 2018, the band embarked on a European tour in support for the album before going on an American tour in support of Idles. Idles lead singer Joe Talbot named Shadow on Everything his favorite album of 2018.

Their time on the road continued into 2019 as they were chosen to perform at South by Southwest and announced an east coast tour in support of Daughters.

In March 2020, while on a North American tour supporting Stray, the band canceled the remainder of their tour dates due to the outbreak of COVID-19. While separated across the country during lockdown, the band began writing new music long-distance. The band was ultimately unhappy with the result and scrapped the EP only to start fresh when they were all back together in New York. They released the resulting EP, Love on My Mind in February 2022 to positive reviews. Pitchfork called it a "novella-like EP whose shoegaze blur and metallic twang animate a dreamlike world of seedy characters and half-forgotten pasts."

Bambara returned to touring in 2021, including dates opening for Foo Fighters and Nothing. In 2022, the song "Miracle" was used in season six of Peaky Blinders. Following the release of Love on My Mind, Bambara went on a two-month European tour and small run of North American dates. The band released its fifth studio album in 2025, titled Birthmarks.

== Musical style and influences ==
Their style has been described as noise rock and post-punk. Noisey's Colin Joyce described the songs as "chaotic" and "being held together with formless washes of noise and anxious vocal drones." Marcos Hassan from Tinymixtapes listed the severity of Swans and the "depraved cabaret mold" of The Birthday Party as the sound they've been honing together. Reid Bateh had a transformative experience listening to Nick Cave and the Bad Seeds' 1996 album Murder Ballads for the first time. Reid Bateh has mentioned the films of Wong Kar Wai and David Lynch and the moods portrayed in them as influences on their sound. Bateh also cited the Southern Gothic themes from the writings of Flannery O'Connor and Bruno Schulz as influences on the themes in Swarm. Bateh has cited photographer Nan Goldin's book The Ballad of Sexual Dependency as an influence to his lyrics on Love on My Mind.

== Band members ==
=== Current ===
- Reid Bateh – lead vocals, guitar (2007–present)
- Blaze Bateh – drums, vocals (2007–present)
- William Brookshire – bass, vocals (2007–present)

=== Live Members ===
- Bryan Keller Jr. – guitar, vocals (2016–present)
- Sam Zalta – guitar, keyboards, samples (2016–present)
- Lilah Larson - guitar, vocals (2025-present)

== Discography ==
=== Studio albums ===
- Dreamviolence (2013)
- Swarm (2016)
- Shadow on Everything (2018)
- Stray (2020)
- Birthmarks (2025)

=== EPs ===
- Dog Ear Days (2010)
- Rings (2012)
- Night Chimes (2015)
- Love on My Mind (2022)
