= Dzierzynski Bitz =

Slovak indie rock band

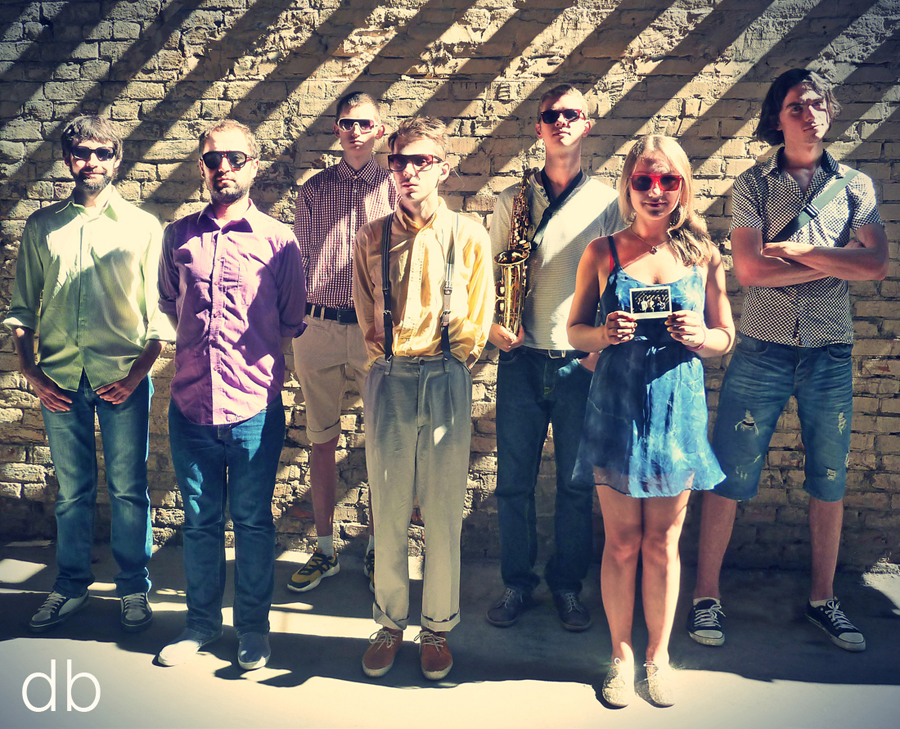

Background information
- Origin: Moscow, Russia
- Genres: New wave, indie, retro
- Years active: 2007 – present
- Members: Wojciech Dzierżyński; Krzysztof Grehuta; Ferko Duricsa; Rámi Kallas; Sergio Dubček; Konstantin Bukowski
- Website: www.novytwist.com

Dzierzynski Bitz is an indie band founded by vocalist and main songwriter Wojciech Dzierżyński in Moscow, Russia. The band's unique style is equally influenced by Edward Gil and Syd Barrett, East-European pre-war music and the British new wave sound. They labelled their sound "multi-instrumental new wave croon pop" under Under the Gun Review.

== History ==
Dzierzynski Bitz' debut album I II III was released in June 2012. The core group enlisted the help of fifteen additional musicians to bring their vision to light. The recording of the album began in Russia and was completed in Ukraine before being mixed in London by Joe Hirst (Deus, Ian Brown, Yasmin). The album's edgy and eccentric modern take on retro influences earned it critically acclaimed.

The group's single, "Podmoskovje / Vziat Siloj", was well-received by both critics and the public. Their second full album, Love Me Do was released in November 2014 and recorded in several studios in Ukraine as well as Russia. It expands the band's style with the more electronic approach and injection of disco-funk grooves.

== Members ==
- Wojciech Dzierżyński – Vocals and percussion
- Sergio Dubček – guitar
- Rámi Kallas – keys
- Konstantin Bukowski – trumpet
- Aleksiej Rudenko – bass
- Krzysztof Grehuta – drums

== Discography ==
- Albums
  - I II III (2012)
  - I II III remastered (2013)
  - Gladiolus (EP; 2014)
  - Love Me Do (2014)
  - Nový Twist (EP; 2015)
- Singles
  - "Deň"/ "Sex w ZSRR" (2010)
  - "Podmoskovje" / "Vziať Siloj" (2013)
  - "Kvity" / "Virazhy" (2014)
  - "Singapour" / "Taina" (2015)

== Music videos ==
- Sex w ZSRR on YouTube (2011)
- Den' on YouTube (2013)
- Женщина / Ženščina / Zhenschina on YouTube (2013)
- Тайна / Taina on YouTube (2014)
- Рок / Rock on YouTube (2015)
