= Graham Sutton (musician) =

British musician

Graham Sutton (born 1972) is an English musician and record producer based in Hackney, UK. He is best known as the leader and key figure of seminal post-rock band Bark Psychosis, as well as being a producer for alternative rock bands since the late 1990s.

== Personal projects ==
=== Bark Psychosis ===
Sutton first came to attention as the main figure in the band Bark Psychosis in which he played guitar, sampler and assorted keyboards as well as handling lead vocals where necessary. Founded in 1986, Bark Psychosis developed a growing reputation in avant-garde rock circles culminating in the 21-minute Scum single in 1992 and the album Hex in 1994, following which the group split up. Secretly revived in 1999, Bark Psychosis formally returned in 2004 as a Sutton solo project with collaborators rather than a band, and released the new album ///Codename: Dustsucker.

=== Boymerang ===
Sutton led the drum and bass dance music project Boymerang from late 1994 until an unspecified date in the late 1990s. Initially working with Bark Psychosis keyboard player Daniel Gish, Sutton continued Boymerang as a solo project. Boymerang released one album – 1997's Balance of the Force – and several EPs.

== Work as producer/mixer/engineer ==
Sutton has produced albums by artists including Jarvis Cocker, British Sea Power, These New Puritans, The Veils, Delays, Snowpony, Dzierzynski Bitz, Coldharbourstores, Pellumair, Bambara and Anjali Bhatia (ex-Voodoo Queens), plus early recordings by The $urplu$ (a band featuring David Callahan of Moonshake and The Wolfhounds).

Sutton has produced single mixes and remixes for acts including Metallica, Goldie, Brakes, Mansun, Stephen Simmonds, Mandalay, Ed Rush, Collapsed Lung, Thes Siniestros, Ultramarine and Wagon Christ.

Sutton has also been in demand as a live sound mixer, including working with Philip Best's Consumer Electronics, A Place to Bury Strangers and as a live sound consultant for These New Puritans.
