= George Barnett (musician, born 1988) =

English drummer of the band These New Puritans

- Born: 9 August 1988 (age 38); United Kingdom
- Origin: Southend-on-Sea, England
- Genres: Art rock
- Occupations: Musician, model
- Instruments: Drums; percussion
- Years active: 2005–present
- Labels: Infectious; Angular/Domino
- Spouse: Pixie Geldof (m. 2017)

George Barnett (born 9 August 1988) is the English drummer of the band These New Puritans. He is also a model, having appeared in campaigns for brands such as Burberry, Lanvin and Valentino.

== Career ==
At 18, he worked for designer and photographer Hedi Slimane at Dior Homme in Paris from 2006 to 2007, after a chance meeting. He went on to both walk and co-write the soundtrack for the A/W 2007 show, both the show and music received good reviews one stating "..band du jour, These New Puritans, provided a sound track that left one wanting more, their drummer George Barnett made for an appealing muse...".

When Hedi Slimane left Dior Homme, Barnett moved to London and recorded These New Puritans debut album, Beat Pyramid, released in 2008 with his twin brother Jack Barnett. It received many reviews one by NME stating they demonstrated a "span of ideas and singularity of vision that simply shouldn't happen to 20-year olds. They've created their own imperfect world."

Whilst touring the Beat Pyramid album he signed a modelling contract with Bananas Models in Paris and Models 1 where he shot the following fashion campaigns for Lanvin, Levi's, Alfred Dunhill, Aquascutum and COS. He has walked as a catwalk model for Dior Homme, Prada, Yves Saint Laurent, Gucci, Burberry, Versace, Bottega Veneta, Valentino, Louis Vuitton and Dries van Noten amongst other brands.

In his modelling career, he has worked with fashion photographers Willy Vandereperre, Hedi Slimane, David Sims, Nick Knight and Alasdair McLellan. He has also appeared in many fashion magazines including British Vogue, i-D Magazine, LOVE magazine, Arena Homme+, AnotherMan, and Dazed and Confused.

In 2010, Barnett's second album Hidden with These New Puritans won NME 's 'Album of the Year 2010'. In late 2010, a series of full live performances of Hidden, entitled 'Hidden Live', took place at venues such as the Barbican Centre (featuring the Britten Sinfonia) and the Pompidou Centre.
