= Bark Psychosis =

English post-rock band

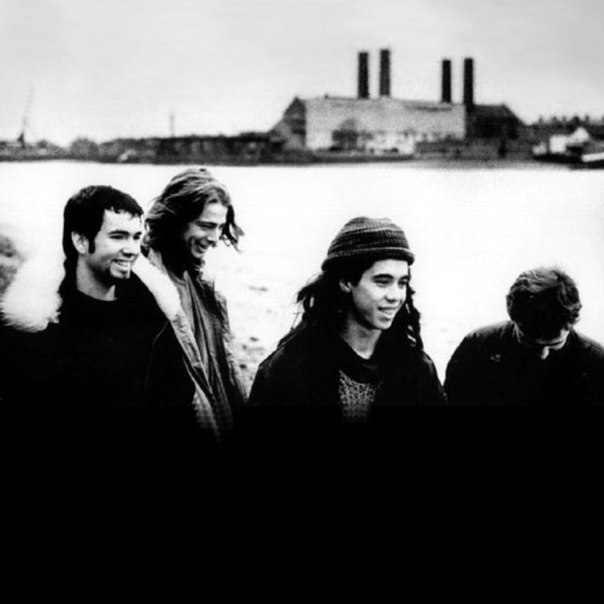
- Bark Psychosis in 1992

Background information
- Origin: London, England
- Genres: Post-rock; indie rock; psychedelia; experimental rock; slowcore; noise rock; ambient
- Years active: 1986–1994; 2004–2005 (hiatus)
- Labels: Cheree; Circa; Fire
- Spinoffs: Boymerang; Yellow6
- Members: Graham Sutton
- Past members: John Ling; Mark Simnett; Rashied Garrison; Sue Page; Daniel Gish

Bark Psychosis were an English post-rock band from London which was formed in 1986. They were led by Graham Sutton who was the sole constant member of the project. They were one of the bands that the British music journalist Simon Reynolds cited when coining "post-rock" as a musical style in 1994, and are thus considered one of the key bands defining the genre.

In its original form, the group was a quartet of Graham Sutton, Daniel Gish, John Ling and Mark Simnett. This line-up (with contributions from other passing members) recorded early singles and EPs plus the seminal 1994 album Hex, before gradually dissolving over the course of 1994, with Sutton moving on to his drum and bass project Boymerang and to production work. Sutton reformed Bark Psychosis in 2004 without any of the other previous members, as a flexible project in which he was supported by a shifting roster of guest musicians (including Talk Talk drummer Lee Harris and experimental guitarist Colin Bradley of Dual).

Due to Sutton's renewed focus on production work, Bark Psychosis have been inactive since 2005, with no announcements of a final breakup or future plans. While active, the band did not find much success critically or commercially, remaining in obscurity for decades, with only a handful of verified live recordings in existence. However, Bark Psychosis have since cultivated a devout cult following, as well as retrospective critical acclaim.

== Sound and influences ==
Bark Psychosis' sound has covered various musical styles including minimalism, introverted indie rock, psychedelia, post-punk, cool jazz, outright mechanical/industrial noise, and electronic dance music. However, the band's music is best characterized by a sense of acoustic space, moody atmospherics, murmured vocals, abstract but emotional lyrics, and a particularly sensitive and acclaimed mixture of electronic and acoustic instrumentation. Bark Psychosis is also noted for an extreme dynamic range, varying from quietly-whispered-and-played songs such as "I Know" or "Absent Friend" to thunderous metallic riffing ("Murder City") or deafening sheets of electric noise (the first half of the track "Hex").

"We started off basically as a noise band; now that has just been turned around completely. Music is really tricky in that you think you've got it pinned down — what you know about music and what you're into — until something comes along and completely changes your perception of things, or your tastes change completely. It's constantly evolving and changing before your eyes and I find that really exciting — where you're going to go next is out of your control to an extent."

— Graham Sutton on the musical evolution of Bark Psychosis

Bark Psychosis' music is also notably melodic and expressive, and arguably owes something to the English pastoral rock tradition. The band is frequently embraced by progressive rock fans due to their experimental outlook, and their use of both atmospherics and extended instrumentation. Sutton himself seems uncomfortable with the association, commenting, "Sometimes people compare us to Pink Floyd, and they are just a muso thing. I'm more interested in feeling, really..."

The band started life as a teenage Napalm Death cover project, reflecting the members' early interest in extreme noise. Other early influences included Sonic Youth, Talk Talk, Wire, Butthole Surfers, Big Black, Swans and Joy Division. Graham Sutton has claimed a long-term interest in dub, jazz and classical music, as well as an appreciation for the work of Nick Drake.

Bark Psychosis' musical development has also been characterized by restlessness, which has contributed to the band's historical lack of stability while at the same time stimulating its creativity. In another 1994 interview, Sutton stated, "The whole thing about being in this band is never repeating yourself. I've always tried to surprise myself and other people as well, fucking around with people's preconceptions about what you're about and stuff. I really get a real huge fucking kick about giving people the wrong impression. Or twisting things around. Like, it might sound initially sweet, but it ain't. Or vice versa."

== History ==
=== Formation and early years (1986–1988) ===
Bark Psychosis was formed in Snaresbrook, London in 1986, emerging from the 1980s East London experimental music scene that also produced AR Kane and Disco Inferno. The original two members were schoolfriends Graham Sutton (guitar, vocals) and John Ling (bass, vocals). Both were aged 14 at the time that they started the band, carrying out their initial experiments using a four-track tape recorder and a drum machine. In January 1988 Ling and Sutton (both aged 16) left school to pursue music full-time. They recruited drummer Mark Simnett, who had previously done community work centered on St John's Church in Stratford, London.

Using Simnett's connection with the church, Bark Psychosis arranged rehearsal space for themselves in the crypt of St John's, a location that would continue to play an important role in Bark Psychosis' music. The trio spent the rest of 1988 rehearsing and composing original material, during which time both Sutton and Ling began to dabble in keyboard playing and digital sampling. A few low-key gigs followed late in the year. One of these concerts was attended by Nick Allport and Vinita Joshi of the small East London independent label Cheree Records. Impressed by the band, Cheree immediately offered to release the band's first recordings. During this period, Bark Psychosis briefly featured a second guitarist, Rashied Garrison. Garrison had previously played in The Moons, a band who had supported Bark Psychosis at early shows. However, his tenure with Bark Psychosis was fairly short and he would later become "a feared journalist", the guitarist in Good Time Pony and leader of The Repton Oaks.

=== Cheree singles and early live gigs (1988–1990) ===
"It's crap. It's not worth the fucking bit of plastic it's printed on. It's complete bollocks. Bollocks, bollocks, bollocks. We literally recorded it in five minutes."

— Graham Sutton on the recording of "Clawhammer"

Bark Psychosis' debut appearance on record was the 1988 Clawhammer flexi-disc (a split release on Cheree, shared with Fury Things and Spacemen 3). By this time, the band were back to their original trio lineup. Six years later (on the eve of the release of the Hex album), Sutton was vituperative in disowning the track.

The official Bark Psychosis debut was 1990's 12-inch single "All Different Things/By Blow", for which the band was augmented by an extra singer, Sue Page, who lived in the same Claremont Road, Leyton squat as Ling and Sutton. In 1994, Sutton recalled:

"At this stage we were so naive we didn't know how things worked, how the whole music business worked. We did two nights of working, from 12 to 8, and gave it to (Cheree)... That's the first time we went in the studio properly, really. Basically, I had my hands on the faders and when it kicked in, I just fucking went to the faders, I didn't know anything about it then. When we were mixing "By Blow" we ended up distorting the DAT and we didn't even fucking notice because it was just monitoring so loud in the control room. It's nice, naive and all the rest of it but it's pretty crap at the same time."

The band's formal live debut (outside of school performances) was at The Sir George Robey in Finsbury Park, London, supporting Extreme Noise Terror. Tours with The Telescopes, Cranes and Spiritualized quickly followed.

Later in 1990, Bark Psychosis released a 12-inch EP called "Nothing Feels" (backed with "I Know"). Sutton later recalled, "The second single was what(ever) two tracks we had knocking around at the time. At the same time, live-wise at this stage, it was completely different. It was very, very loud and extreme both ways."

By this time, Bark Psychosis were establishing a reputation as one of the most unpredictable, innovative live bands in Britain with a great degree of spontaneity and excitement at their gigs. On record, however, they were developing into a more atmospheric and melodic act, while avoiding many of the standard rock "cliches" such as extended solos and self-mythologizing lyrics: beyond their melody lines and rhythms, the band remained abstract and textural. Regarding his musical evolution at the time, Sutton later commented, "For some reason I just flipped one day and I realized silence could have a much greater impact than loud noise... Space and silence are the most important tools you can use in music. I just got really obsessed with that."

=== A year in the wilderness; signing to 3rd Stone Ltd. (1990–1991) ===
Having signed a formal recording contract with Cheree, Bark Psychosis immediately found themselves dismayed by management changes at the label. Cheree's two new commercial backers were later described by Sutton as "a couple of cons, really, that had screwed so many people," with links to various dubious businesses including pornography. During this time, the band met with a man claiming to be Lee Harris, former drummer with their old influences Talk Talk, who talked them into hiring him as producer and who set about arranging recording time in central London. Before much longer, "Harris" was revealed to be a session drummer named John Ward who'd been attempting to reinvent himself as a producer, and recording plans fell apart.

Ward's temporary influence on Bark Psychosis, combined with their misgivings about the new Cheree partners, had damaged the band's confidence in their record company: they reneged on their contract and spent a year extricating themselves from the situation, during which time Sue Page left the band. Much-needed managerial and financial support during this period was provided by the band's friend Rudi Tambala of AR Kane. Sutton has commented: "That year was murder. When we were trying to get away from Cheree it was fucking hell. I had a lot of problems after that year. I was squatting and stuff and did a lot of things I shouldn't have done. It's caused a lot of problems." Sutton would also later admit to having had a nervous breakdown.

Eventually, the band's contract with Cheree was bought out by 3rd Stone Ltd., the Corby-based alternative record label which had headhunted the band on the reputation of their initial singles.

=== Manman EP; The Scum single (1992) ===
Bark Psychosis' debut release for 3rd Stone — 1992's Manman EP — demonstrated clear influences from techno and musique concrète. The band's potential had dramatically expanded with the addition of keyboard/synthesizer player Daniel Gish (formerly of Disco Inferno). By now, Sutton and Ling's interest in digital sampling and programming had become much more overt. From that point onward, sampling became a major feature of the Bark Psychosis sound, combining with the effect of Gish's own influences (which included Kraftwerk, New Order, The The and Dead Can Dance). Sutton was later to comment, "To an extent, every record we make is a reaction to the one that came before it."

Later in 1992, Bark Psychosis released a hugely acclaimed landmark single called Scum. This was an ominous, 21-minute ambient piece improvised and recorded live in the band's "home" of St John's Church. Recalling the events several years later, Sutton admitted "we had a single to do but we didn't have any tracks that were suitable for a single. We wanted to do something completely new and put ourselves under a certain amount of risk. So basically we hired a load of gear and set up sort of a makeshift string and sticky-tape kind of studio under the church where we rehearsed for ages, and in the church as well... We didn't have a track when we started, so we just set ourselves ten days to do a 12-inch and that's what came out... It's probably the most spontaneous record we've put out."

Scum experimented with the use of space and extreme dynamics, with music that varied between minimal jazzy chording, airy acoustic drums, clamorous noise guitar, space-ambience and random vocal snippets. "There was no part except for a few rough galactic idea(s)," Sutton recalled. "That's how we'd written the past few years, just jamming as a band underneath the church. 99.999% of it, you wouldn't use any of it; but the vibe was really good at the time, so we decided why not just record a jam sort of thing. That's the thing, we tend to try and make life very difficult for ourselves for some reason. I'm not sure why... Ninety per cent of it was recorded live and then there was a few things. Vocals, some piano, some ambient guitar, a few different samples and stuff. The first three-and-a-half minutes of it was actually just the ambient mics left up. We had recorded a few different takes of things and those distance mics were just left up from a previous jam."

Regarding the sudden bursts of indistinct speaking voices that punctuated the single, Sutton noted that "that was just a found thing at the church. On one of the nights we were recording there was a Pentecostal meeting going on in the back room, so we sort of sneaked up to their door and just tape-recorded them because it sounded so brilliant." The single's ominous atmosphere and disaffected, whispered lyric "came about as a general disaffection with general sentiments from records that were being shoved down my throat. Crap house tracks. I just remember this one track had this chorus like "Everybody's free" and it made me want to fucking puke. I just wanted something completely the opposite of that and (to) turn that sentiment around."

The single gained the band a lot of press attention (being awarded Single of the Week in Melody Maker amongst other plaudits), and demand for an album grew. Later in the year, Bark Psychosis signed to Circa Records in order to finance further recordings.

=== Recording Hex (1992–93) ===
In November 1992, Bark Psychosis began recording a self-produced debut album, to be called Hex. The recording of the album consolidated the ideas which the band had explored on Scum. As had been the case with Scum, the sessions made extensive use of the natural acoustics of St John's Church, with other recording work done in studios in Bath, Brighton and London. In an interview with the Audrie's Diary fanzine in 1994, Sutton explained "Most people, to get a big reverb sound, will record something and then run it through a reverb unit. But we've taken the trouble to record in a church... When you set up mics, you capture more than just what is being recorded. You capture an ambience or a feeling as well. It's all about creating something unique and of the moment rather than just another bland factory preset."

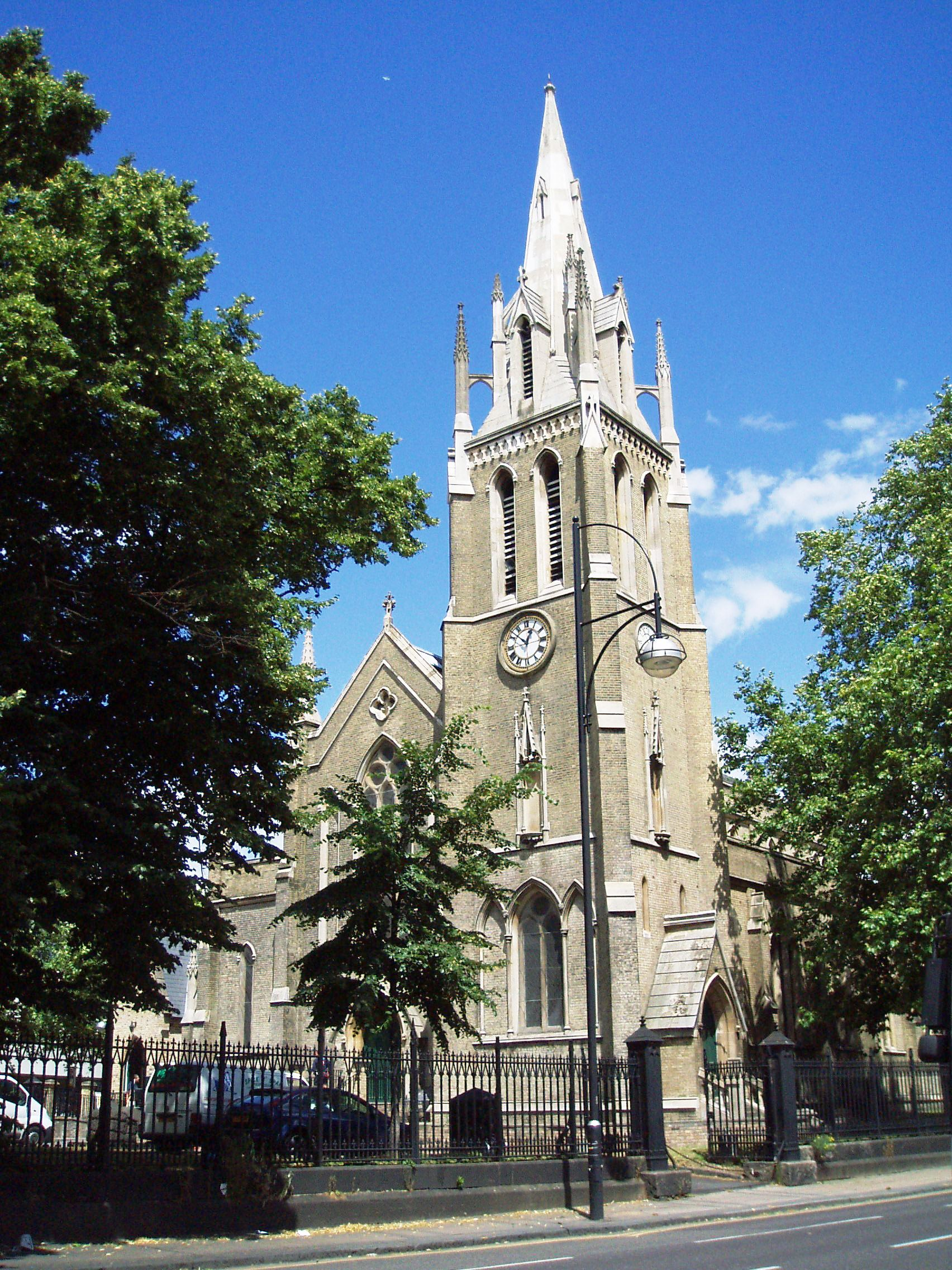
St John's Church, Stratford – the recording venue for Scum and Hex

In an interview with the Weedbus fanzine at the same time, Sutton commented:

"If you were making a film or something you want to have special effects — for example, a train going over a cliff. Then you either get a little model of it and simulate, or you can get a real train because that's probably going to be more effective. We wanted to capture real acoustics rather than have everything computer simulated. A lot of keyboards can sound very bland so you have to look at recording them in a different way. We wanted to have a gritty edge to it. We got a PA and set it up in a church, a really huge church in Stratford, east London, just beside a huge traffic island, so we had to do it late at night when there was no traffic! We had the keyboards coming out of the PA and the microphones at the other end of the church. It created a very interesting atmosphere..."

By this point, the band had developed a singularly unique and varied sound — embedded in lush electronic sampling and textures and accented with electric guitars, piano, and melodica. Regarding the sampling, Sutton commented "although the album doesn't sound like it, a good fifty per cent of it was just running from computer... A lot of things. Guitar things. Moving things around, you know, cutting things out, then moving them around. Bits of vocal moved around... There's also a lot of samples of instruments involved. But we do it in a way that is idiosyncratic to us... Although Hex is sample-orientated, it doesn't necessarily sound like that, and there is an acoustic drum-kit in there, recorded in such a way that it sounds quite idiosyncratic to me. The album doesn't fit in that well, which I'm happy about — I wouldn't like it to fit in with a homogeneous agenda like dance music, or ambient music, whatever. The area of ambient music interests me more than any other but it's still too stylised." Sutton himself was moving in the direction of electronic music and paying less attention to his guitar playing. "I had a tremolo pedal, a chorus pedal, a delay pedal. That's it. But I really haven't played much guitar in the last year. I've been mostly fucking around with samplers. I'm more interested in pure sound, than just a guitar or whatever."

Hex featured guest musicians the Duke String Quartet, Animals That Swim's trumpeter Del Crabtree, Phil Brown on flute, and Neil Aldridge and Dave Ross on assorted percussion. The band also called in vibraphone player Pete Beresford (the father of one of Sutton's friends), of whom Sutton later recalled "(he) was this really, really old guy who used to play in a lot of old war time swing bands for kids going out for a dance in London. He hadn't taken his vibes out of his front room for fucking years, he just plays for his own pleasure, as a hobby. So we got him to come down and it was fucking brilliant, and I want to work with him again."

The recording of Hex proved to be tortuous, with plenty of infighting centered around Sutton's stubbornness and dominance of the band, as well as his insistence that all of the band finances went into recording the album. In 2001, Sutton would reminisce "I have great memories of working on (Hex), even if I did do everyone's head in!" However, in a 1994 interview he described the album sessions as "the most intense fucking year of my life. The longest I had been in a studio was ten days for Scum, but this was like a year of my life... It was quite hairy at some points." The band interrupted the album recording sessions on 31 January 1993, to play a one-off concert at Ronnie Scott's jazz club in London. This was to be their last performance together as a quartet.

Two members of Bark Psychosis were to leave the band during the remaining sessions. The first was Daniel Gish, whose departure was formally announced in Melody Maker on 18 December 1993. Gish would cite "lack of record company support" as his motive for leaving, with Sutton commenting, "all I can say is the split was amicable,": he would also describe Gish as having "gone to Israel for a bit. He's going to come back though and I still want to work with him." The last track from the sessions, "Big Shot", was recorded by the remaining three members.

Once Hex was completed, John Ling also quit Bark Psychosis, feeling "burnt out and unable to play," allegedly due to the stress of making the album. At the time, Sutton commented that "(John) felt he just needed to get some distance from it once we'd finished it. I think he's moved to Holland now to do Spiral Tribe or squat over there or something... It's just been a fucking intense year, though it might not sound like it on the record. It's been a real head-fuck." Ling would not return to the band. He subsequently quit the music business to spend a period travelling the world, and later pursued a career as a psychiatric nurse as well as starting a family. Many years later, Sutton would admit "I know I can be 'difficult' to work with; I get very opinionated — and I'll fight tooth and nail for what I believe in. John had a problem with that and chose to leave."

=== The release of Hex (early 1994) ===
In January 1994, the band released "A Street Scene" as a single. Although plans for live concerts had initially been upset by the departure of John Ling, the band carried out a five-date promotional tour with guest musicians including Daniel Gish, who had been invited to rejoin the lineup as a guest musician rather than full band member. The band screened the animated Bolex Brothers film The Secret Adventures of Tom Thumb rather than use a support act. Hex itself was released on 14 February 1994. It was licensed to Circa Records (a division of Virgin Records) and released worldwide through EMI. In the US, the album was released on Caroline Records.

"Things can get very sterile if you just use samples all the time... but I'm also very into digital technology and how you can manipulate sound with that. The vibes track on "Big Shot" (from the Hex album) was a whole mixture of five or six different takes and we sort of just chopped it up and reversed bits and pieces and mixed it all back together again. So we mixed technology with that chaotic human element of a person playing."

— Graham Sutton on using recording technology

When British music critic Simon Reynolds reviewed the album in the March 1994 issue of Mojo magazine, he used the term "post-rock" to describe the band's approach to music. He later expanded upon the idea in the May 1994 issue of The Wire. While this was not the first use of the term, it was the example which brought the "post-rock" concept to public knowledge to the point where it was a major stylistically defining term in music criticism and discourse during the 1990s. This review (and the subsequent discussion which it inspired) ensured that Bark Psychosis were one of the first bands recognised as being post-rock artists. Although Hex was not a commercial success at the time, it has continued to sell steadily over the years and retains a reputation as a key album in post-rock and experimental rock circles.

=== The Blue period — mutation, disintegration and split (mid-1994) ===
In March 1994, 3rd Stone released a posthumous Bark Psychosis compilation album called Independency. This collected together the early Bark Psychosis singles and EPs on both Cheree and 3rd Stone, and included Scum in its entirety.

Now reduced to a duo of Sutton and Simnett, Bark Psychosis went on to record the Blue EP, released in May 1994, and promoted with a UK tour, also featuring Gish. The title track was comparatively more upbeat than the band's work on Hex (and was apparently therapeutic for Sutton, who was allegedly getting over the demise of a "stormy personal relationship" at the time). Blue was also very strongly influenced by dance music, sounding closer to a New Order pop single than it did to the moody post-rock of previous releases. The EP also featured a Rudi Tambala remix of the Hex track "Big Shot" and (confusingly) a newly recorded track called "Hex" - recorded, like its album namesake, at St John's Church - featuring three-and-a-half minutes of deafening noise textures eventually dissolving into ambient keyboards and trumpet. The EP was mixed at Metropolis Studios in West London.

"The band disintegrated because I was getting into using samplers... We used to sample a little bit, but never as an intrinsic part, which always annoyed me, because I wanted to get into that more... I reached an impasse in how much further you could take it in that direction. I wanted to make things a bit tougher as well. And if you've got a drummer, it restricts what you do straight away. There was (a) B-side which was trying to do drum 'n' bass with the drums, but it's pointless: you've got to get stuck in and get your hands dirty, make some tough decisions; which is hard if you've been working for a few years. It's hard for a drummer to take. So in that sense (it was) quite difficult."

— Graham Sutton on the final disintegration of the original Bark Psychosis in 1994

Blue clearly revealed that Sutton's interest was now heading towards programmed and sequenced rhythms. By this stage he was asking Simnett to replicate jungle breakbeats at speed on his kit. Bark Psychosis performed at the Britronica Festival in April 1994 in Moscow alongside Seefeel, Autechre, Ultramarine and Aphex Twin. After this concert, an increasingly sidelined Simnett left the band. Six years later, Simnett would resurface in the instrumental post-rock band Yellow6, playing drums for their two live concerts in 2000 and subsequently moving to bass for five concerts in 2001. He would also contribute to Porcupine Tree leader Steven Wilson's Incredible Expanding Mindfuck project.

Although Bark Psychosis never formally split up, Simnett's departure effectively ended the band, as Sutton had by now lost interest in experimental rock and become a full-scale convert to drum and bass music. In a 2001 interview, Sutton recalled, "By the end it was just me with Mark drumming and a nice pool of different people to draw upon. The last couple of tours we did in '94 I just loved. But by that point I knew I wanted to try something else." Later in the summer, Sutton reunited with Daniel Gish to record some new tracks in an ambient and drum and bass style, which they performed at the 1994 Phoenix Festival in Stratford-upon-Avon. Although the duo's performance was billed under the Bark Psychosis name (and was technically the band's last appearance for ten years), it was in effect the debut of a brand new project which was only tenuously related to Bark Psychosis music.

Later, In 1997, 3rd Stone released a second Bark Psychosis compilation album called Game Over, which combined early tracks (as previously released on Independency) with the Blue single and several tracks from Hex including the studio outtake "Murder City". It also contained a rare cover of the Wire song "Three Girl Rhumba" from the Wire tribute album Whore. Game Over was not endorsed by the band.

=== Post-split – Boymerang, .O.rang, and Sutton as producer (1994–2003) ===
Following their Phoenix Festival performance, Sutton and Gish renamed their new drum and bass project Boymerang. The new tracks premiered at Phoenix were released as part of an EP, also called Boymerang (the first release by The Leaf Label). Gish subsequently left the project and disappeared into the world of dance music in order to work in various mysteriously-named subgenres referred to as "dark garage", "dreamhouse", and "night music". Now featuring Sutton alone, Boymerang released several more EPs and an album (1997's Balance Of The Force). A few musicians from the Bark Psychosis world — most notably trumpeter Del Crabtree — contributed to some tracks.

Sutton also became a significant collaborator to .O.rang, the experimental band formed by former Talk Talk members Lee Harris and Paul Webb. He contributed various instrumentation and programming to the Herd of Instinct and Fields And Waves albums as well as to the Spoor EP; and remixed the track P53 for single release.

In parallel to (and subsequent to) his activities with Boymerang and .O.rang, Graham Sutton made a name for himself as a record producer. He has produced albums by Jarvis Cocker, Delays, Snowpony, The Veils, Coldharbourstores, British Sea Power, Pellumair and Anjali Bhatia (ex-Voodoo Queens), plus early recordings by The $urplu$ (a band featuring David Lance Callahan of Moonshake and The Wolfhounds). He has also produced single mixes and remixes for acts including Metallica, Goldie, Brakes, Mansun, Stephen Simmonds, Mandalay, Ed Rush, Collapsed Lung, Ultramarine and Wagon Christ.

=== Bark Psychosis mark II (2004–present) ===
After a ten-year hiatus, Sutton formally relaunched Bark Psychosis in 2004 and revealed that he had, in fact, been recording new Bark Psychosis tracks since 1999 with various collaborators. The project was now, in effect, a Graham Sutton solo project in all but name, with Sutton playing the majority of the instrumentation himself.

Sutton's most prominent collaborators for this new phase were Colin Bradley (better known as the guitarist from Dual) and the former Talk Talk/.O.rang drummer Lee Harris. Other contributors to the project were Anja Buechele (the former singer for The $urplu$), bass player David Panos, New Zealand multi-instrumentalist Rachel Dreyer (piano, vocals, wood flute), Shaun Hyder (Sindhi tamboura), Alice Kemp (bowed guitar) and T.J. Mackenzie (trumpet). One of the clearest indications that the project had changed was that Sutton was now sharing his lead singer's role with others: Buechele and Dreyer covered many of the vocals, sometimes even singing entire songs. Conversely, a link with the past came from Pete Beresford who contributed vibraphone, reprising his role on Hex. Former Bark Psychosis drummer Mark Simnett was also present on the recordings, but only in the form of unspecified sampled drum tracks.

"(It) just felt like the right time. I’d felt really spent after recording Hex and wanted to have a break from BP – it's pretty gruelling stuff to make – but enough time had passed for me to feel recharged and enthusiastic for making the next album. I’m not really interested in anything so nauseating as having some kind of "career" – I just make music when I want to and aim to please myself and nobody else. However I had no idea that it would take so long! For what it's worth I don’t envisage as long a gap until the next one."

— Graham Sutton, interviewed in the Somewherecold webzine regarding the return of Bark Psychosis

The revitalized Bark Psychosis released a new album, ///Codename: Dustsucker on Fire Records in 2004 (accompanied by a new single called "The Black Meat"). ///Codename: Dustsucker revealed that Bark Psychosis was no longer confined by the formal limitations of either rock band or dance music project, as might have been expected. As opposed to Hex's more consistent approach (which worked the band's influences and ideas around an established rhythm section and melodic instrumentation, and which sounded like the work of an isolated live band with guests), Dustsucker was a diverse — even sprawling — collection of musical ideas. Sutton was exploring separate instrumentation from track to track, with the "trademark" Bark Psychosis approach to dynamics and atmosphere serving as the linking project identity. Although several pieces featured familiar Bark Psychosis ingredients (such as the interplay of Sutton's tremolo electric guitar and minimal keyboards), others were based around strummed acoustic guitar and resembled either folk music or some of the band's pre-"Scum" psychedelic work, while others had elements of cool jazz, Indian classical sounds, or — as in the case of "Shapeshifting" – a post-Boymerang fascination with the possibilities of extended rhythm and noise.

Rather than make new pressings of the Independency and Game Over albums, 3rd Stone Ltd had apparently already planned to release a new compilation (Replay) featuring previously released material, deleted material and unreleased live tracks. Whether by accident or design, Replay was released at around the same time as ///Codename: Dustsucker. As had been the case with Game Over, the release was not endorsed by the band. In December 2004, American webzine Somewhere Cold voted Bark Psychosis Artist of the Year on their 2004 Somewhere Cold Awards Hall of Fame list.

In May 2005, Bark Psychosis released the 400 Winters EP. This featured three Dustsucker album tracks "deconstructed and reassembled" by Colin Bradley.

=== Current activity ===
Although the Hex track "Pendulum Man" was featured in the 2008 movie Definitely, Maybe, Bark Psychosis has been dormant since 2005, mainly due to Sutton concentrating on his work as a producer. He has not announced a formal end to the project, but has also not expressed any recent interest in returning to Bark Psychosis work. In a 2014 interview with The Quietus, Sutton explained "I'm just not interested in clogging up the place, I suppose. I've always wanted to make something that has real meaning or significance to me, and not for any other reason. The wheels will turn again at some point, but only when I say the time is right. It has to be at the point where I have no other option."

In July 2017, it was announced that Bark Psychosis' debut album Hex would be reissued on both vinyl and CD on Fire Records.

== Members ==
=== Current/final members ===
- Graham Sutton – vocals, samples, guitar, piano, melodica, Hammond organ, bass, synthesizer, programming (1986–present)

=== Former members ===
- John Ling — bass, samples, percussion (1986–1994)
- Mark Simnett — drums, percussion (1988–1994)
- Rashied Garrison — guitar (1988)
- Sue Page — additional vocals (1989–1992)
- Daniel Gish — keyboards, piano, Hammond organ (1991–1993, 1994)

== Trivia ==
- The name of the Hex track "Pendulum Man" is derived from Sutton's nickname during the album sessions ("I was mood swinging around like fuck, going from one extreme to another.)"
- During the making of ///Codename: Dustsucker, Graham Sutton intentionally leaked parts of the album to various peer-to-peer file sharing networks.
- Sue Page (Bark Psychosis' co-singer on the early Cheree singles) has contributed voice-over work for the mystery adventure game Scratches (under her married name of Sue Anderson).
- The track Rose on ///Codename: Dustsucker features a slowed down sample of Sutton's pet budgie.

== Discography ==
=== Albums ===
- Hex (1994)
- ///Codename: Dustsucker (2004)

=== EPs ===
- Manman (1992)
- Scum (1992)
- Hexcerpt (1994) (promo only)
- 400 Winters EP (2005)

=== Singles ===
- Clawhammer (1988)
- All Different Things (1990)
- Nothing Feels (1990)
- A Street Scene (1994)
- Blue (1994)
- The Black Meat (2005)

=== Compilations ===
- Independency (1994) – compiles all EP tracks from 1988 to 1992
- Game Over (1997) – compiles tracks from Hex and previous EPs, plus several rarities and outtakes
- Replay (2004) – similar release to Game Over

=== Appearances on various artist compilation albums ===
Bark Psychosis

- My Cheree Amour (Cheree, 1991)
- Signed Sealed & Delivered 1 (Virgin, 1994)
- World On Edge 2 (EMI, 1994)
- Ambient 3: Music Of Changes (Virgin, 1994)
- Ambient Extractions 1 (C&S, 1995)
- A Taste Of Third Stone 1 (Third Stone, 1996)
- The Big Chill: Eyelid Movies (Global Headz, 1996)
- Whore: Various Artists Play Wire (WMO, 1996)
- Sessions Magazine (1997)
- A Taste Of Third Stone 2 (Third Stone, 1997)
- Ambient Journeys (Virgin, 1997)

Boymerang

- Ambient Extractions 2 (C&S, 1996)
- Classic Plant (Leaf Label, 1998)
- Classic Plant 2 (Leaf Label)
- Derailed Presents Fallout (Derailed, 1998)
- Check The Water (Leaf Label, 2005)
