= Post-rock =

Rock music genre

- Stylistic origins: Experimental rock; krautrock; progressive rock; math rock; post-punk; indie rock; ambient; avant-garde; electronica; contemporary classical; psychedelia; dub; avant-garde jazz; cool jazz; space rock; IDM; minimalism
- Cultural origins: Early 1990s, United Kingdom, Canada and United States
- Derivative forms: Ambient pop; drone rock; post-metal

Local scenes
- Louisville; Bristol; Chicago; Montreal

Other topics
- Alternative rock; art rock; dream pop; indie electronic; industrial music; turntablism; jazz fusion; noise rock; post-hardcore; post-progressive; shoegaze; space rock revival

Post-rock is a subgenre of experimental rock that emphasizes texture, atmosphere, and non-traditional song structures over conventional rock techniques. Post-rock acts can often combine rock instrumentation and stylings with unorthodox elements, such as patterns and minimal arrangements, or electronics and digital production, as a means of enabling the exploration of textures, timbres and different styles. Vocals, when present, can be used as an instrumental layer, with many bands opting for entirely instrumental compositions, although some still engage with the verse–chorus form. The genre is associated with the indie and underground music scenes.

The term post-rock was coined by music journalist Simon Reynolds and eventually popularized in his review of Bark Psychosis' 1994 album Hex. He later expanded the concept as music "using rock instrumentation for non-rock purposes". In the 2000s, the term narrowed to refer to bands oriented around dramatic and suspense-driven instrumental rock, making its continuing usage controversial among listeners and artists alike.

Groups such as Talk Talk and Slint are credited with producing foundational works in the style in the late 1980s and early 1990s. The release of Tortoise's 1996 album Millions Now Living Will Never Die led to post-rock becoming an established term for the genre in music criticism and journalism. In its second wave, post-rock diversified into subgenres, influencing indie rock, electronica, forms of metal, and other styles.

== Characteristics ==
Post-rock emphasizes the exploration and use of textures, timbres, and non-rock influences. Rather than relying on traditional song structures or riffs, it—as a musical aesthetic—focuses on atmosphere and mood to create a musically evocative experience. Post-rock incorporates stylings and traits from a variety of musical genres and scenes, including indie rock and its forms like slowcore and math rock, as well as krautrock, ambient music, psychedelia, progressive rock, space rock, tape music, minimalist classical, British IDM, jazz (including avant-garde jazz and cool jazz), dub, post-punk, free jazz, contemporary classical and avant-garde electronica.

Often, first wave post-rock groups exhibited influence from the krautrock of the 1970s, particularly the motorik, the characteristic krautrock rhythm, and its one- or two-chord melodicism. These influences were also pivotal for the substyle of ambient pop, where the framework of post-rock was applied to indie pop. Post-rock acts frequently blend traditional rock instrumentation and stylistic elements with electronic and digital production, using this combination to explore a wider range of textures, timbres, and musical styles. The genre originated in the indie and underground music scenes of the 1980s and 1990s in Europe and North America, but it became increasingly distinct from the conventions of indie rock of that era, while simultaneously influencing indie rock.

=== Instrumentation ===
Though typically performed using standard rock instrumentation—guitars, bass, drums, and keyboards—post-rock compositions often subvert the expected uses of these instruments, for example by employing guitars as noise generators or focusing on sonic texture rather than melody. However, instruments were often used in non-traditional ways, acting as a "palette of textures" rather than for their conventional rock roles. It can be lengthy and instrumental, containing repetitive build-ups of timbres, dynamics and textures, often making use of repetition of musical motifs and subtle changes with an extremely wide range of dynamics. In some respects, this is similar to the music of Steve Reich, Philip Glass and Brian Eno, pioneers of minimalism who were acknowledged influences on bands in the first wave of post-rock.

Guitars, rather than serving melodic or riff-driven purposes, are often employed as tools for texture and atmosphere. Artists manipulate timbre through alternate tunings, effects like delay and distortion, EBows, and looping, sometimes processing guitars to the point of becoming unrecognizable. Drums and percussion in post-rock frequently defy traditional roles, drawing inspiration from krautrock's hypnotic "motorik" beats and dub's spacious, bass-heavy rhythms. It can feature, as is prominently the case in the first wave, multiple drum kits, irregular tempos, and/or minimalist patterns that prioritize mood over groove. The bass guitar often assumes a central role in shaping post-rock's atmospheric depth, diverging from standard rock's rhythmic lock with the bass drum, extending from post-punk. Influenced by dub and ambient music in addition, basslines may consist of sustained drones, pulsating loops, or sparse, resonant notes that anchor the composition's harmonic framework, differing from the walking bass trope of conventional rock.

With the increasing accessibility of samplers in the late 1980s, bands drew inspiration from contemporary electronica and experimental electronic music to restructure their compositions with sampling. Samplers, along with sequencers and MIDI setups, allowed for both ordered and chaotic elements to coexist within a single piece. The recording studio is regarded as an essential component of the creative process in post-rock. English acts such as Disco Inferno, Insides, Seefeel and Third Eye Foundation made the recording studio an active component of composition, employing hardware for live processing and sampling, and software like Cubase to sequence tracks, fragmenting and reassemble guitar sounds and vocals as abstract sonic material over drum patterns and beats.

=== Vocals and structure ===
Vocals play a much lesser role in most post-rock and are sometimes entirely absent. When post-rock bands have vocalists, their performances are often non-traditional, with them employing vocals as purely instrumental efforts and incidental to the sound. Vocals are often presented as spoken word, found audio samples, or stylized delivery such as murmured or shouted passages. Bands often treat the voice as an additional instrument. Lyrics, if included, are often non-narrative, poetic, or opaque, reflecting themes of alienation, ambiguity, or abstraction.

While the verse–chorus form is not exempt from the ethos of post-rock, in lieu of typical rock structures, groups make greater use of soundscapes and abstraction. Reynolds states in his essay "Post-Rock" from Audio Culture that "a band's journey through rock to post-rock usually involves a trajectory from narrative lyrics to stream-of-consciousness to voice-as-texture to purely instrumental music". Songs in the genre can include climactic endings alongside buildups of textures and timbres, used to provide closure in otherwise linear compositions. This structural trope became a hallmark of second wave post-rock, where bands focused on dramatic, suspenseful instrumental rock; this usage of the term became controversial among both listeners and musicians.

== Etymology ==
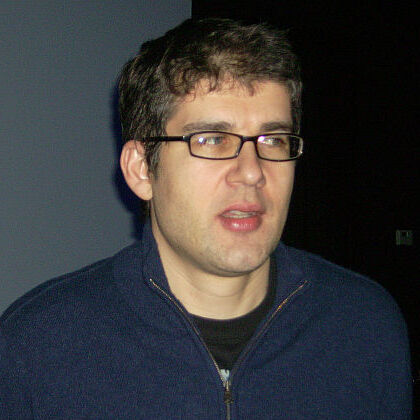
The term post-rock was first defined by music journalist Simon Reynolds (pictured).

The term post-rock was coined by the English music journalist Simon Reynolds in a Melody Maker article in late 1993, which is the earliest instance of him using the term. He later employed it in a review of Bark Psychosis' 1994 album Hex, published in the March 1994 issue of Mojo. Reynolds further developed the concept in a May 1994 issue of The Wire, defining post-rock as "using rock instrumentation for non-rock purposes, using guitars as facilitators of timbre and textures rather than riffs and power chords". He further expounded on the term that:

Perhaps the really provocative area for future development lies [...] in cyborg rock; not the wholehearted embrace of Techno's methodology, but some kind of interface between real time, hands-on playing and the use of digital effects and enhancement.

Reynolds, in a July 2005 entry in his blog, said he later found the term not to be of his own coinage, writing in his blog "I discovered many years later it had been floating around for over a decade". In 2021, Reynolds reflected on the evolution of the style, saying that the term had developed in meaning during the 21st century, no longer referring to "left-field UK guitar groups engaged in a gradual process of abandoning songs [and exploring] texture, effects processing, and space", but instead coming to signify "epic and dramatic instrumental rock, not nearly as post- as it likes to think it is".

The earliest use of the term cited by Reynolds dates back as far as September 1967. In a Time cover story feature on the Beatles, writer Christopher Porterfield hails the band and producer George Martin's creative use of the recording studio, declaring that this is "leading an evolution in which the best of current post-rock sounds are becoming something that pop music has never been before an art form". Other uses of the term include its employment in a 1975 article by American journalist James Wolcott about musician Todd Rundgren, although with a different meaning. It was also used in the Rolling Stone Album Guide to name a style roughly corresponding to "avant-rock" or "out-rock", the latter of which became synonymous with post-rock during the first wave. Alternately, an April 1992 review of the single "Stacey's Cupboard" by 1990s noise pop band the Earthmen by Steven Walker in Melbourne music publication Juke describes the song as a "post-rock noisefest".

== History ==
=== 1960s–1980s: influences and precursors ===
In music journalism and criticism, various retroactive examples have been given of precursors to post-rock. For instance, with regard to the 1960s and early 1970s in music, the "dronology" of the Velvet Underground, most apparent on their 1967 album The Velvet Underground & Nico, was referred to by Reynolds in 1994 as having significantly influenced much "of today's post rock activity" in the first wave, especially with regard to the 1990s space rock revival. Both the American experimental electronic rock band Silver Apples and Germany's krautrock scene which included Can, Neu!, Faust and Cluster were prevalent influences on post-rock in the first wave.

The post-punk and no wave movements—via acts like Sonic Youth, Glenn Branca, and Ut—experimented with dissonance, non-linear structures, sustained tones, and noise, challenging rock's musical and performative norms. Similarly, This Heat, which formed in 1976, demonstrated an emphasis on texture, significantly unconventional musical stylings, and repetitive structures.

Stylus Magazine observed that David Bowie's 1977 album Low, produced by Tony Visconti, would have been considered post-rock if released twenty years later. Louder also described the English post-punk band Wire as "the genre's godfathers", highlighting their 1979 studio album 154 as an early precursor that signposted the beginning of post-rock.

British post-punk band Public Image Ltd have been seen as pivotal for post-rock, with the NME describing them as "arguably the first post-rock group" when referring to their first few albums. Their 1979 album Metal Box almost completely abandoned traditional rock structures in favor of dense, repetitive dub- and krautrock-inspired soundscapes and John Lydon's cryptic, stream-of-consciousness lyrics. The year before Metal Box was released, PiL bassist Jah Wobble declared that "rock is obsolete".

=== 1990s: first wave ===
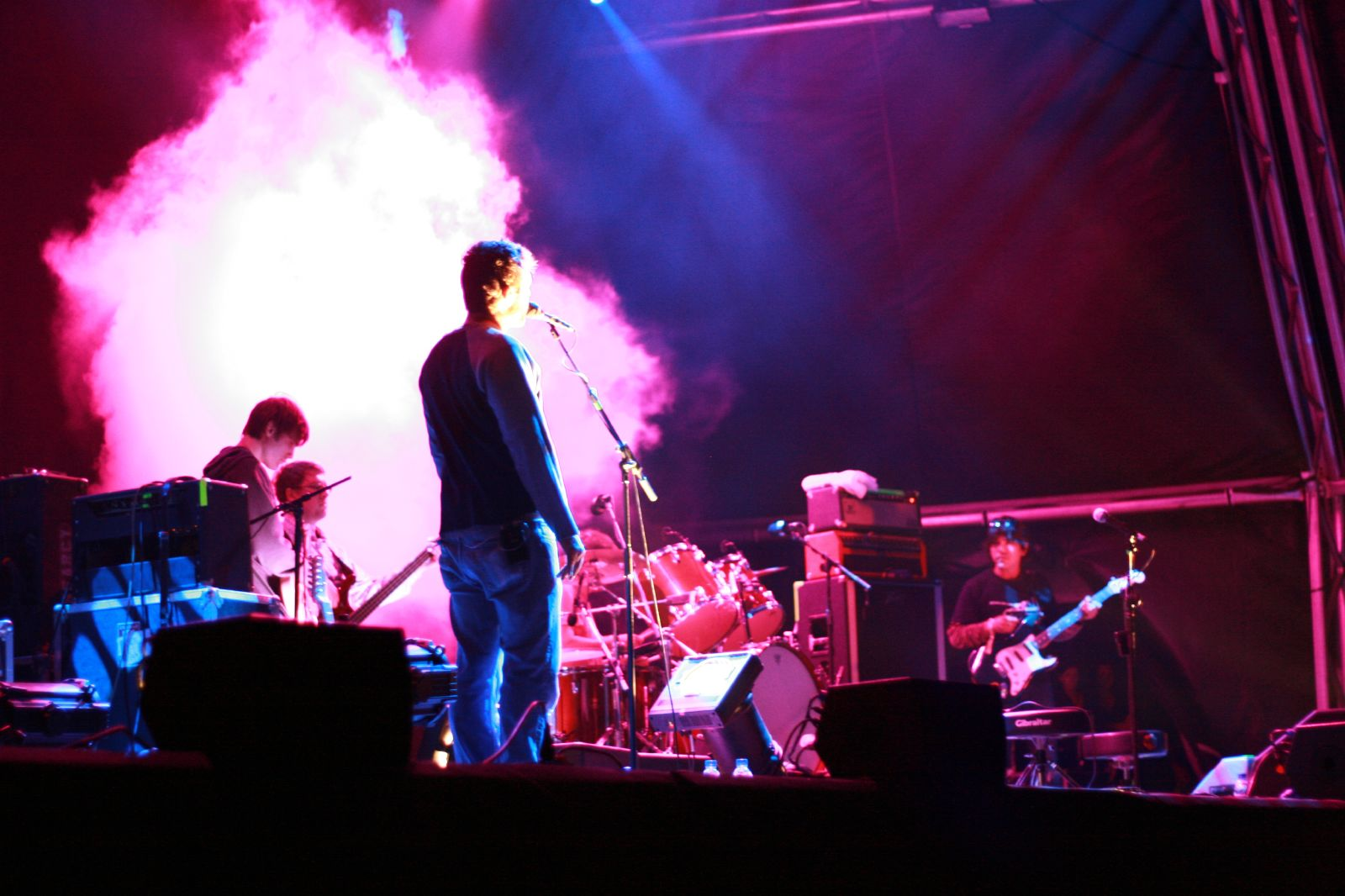
Spiderland by Slint (pictured) is widely regarded as a pioneering album in the development of post-rock

Critics have retroactively regarded the Louisville, Kentucky-based rock band Slint's 1991 album Spiderland as having anticipated and inspired the more strictly indie rock-derived area of post-rock; the album is characterized by its dramatic shifts in dynamics both instrumentally and vocally, as well as its deliberate, bass-driven grooves and moody composition. The English art rock band Talk Talk's albums Spirit of Eden, released 3 years prior and Laughing Stock, released in the same year, were identified as influential on post-rock by critics for their drawn out song structures, relying on influences from jazz, contemporary classical music and space rock.

The term was initially applied to a wave of primarily English independent bands in the early 1990s who drew from genres such as psychedelia, contemporary electronica, hip-hop, free improvisation, and the avant-garde in general. Examples include Stereolab, Moonshake, Laika, Disco Inferno, Seefeel, Bark Psychosis, Pram, Insides and Papa Sprain, as well as the earlier influential act A.R. Kane, many of which began in post-punk and shoegaze roots and variously explored the aforementioned influences. These were largely deemed post-rock as such in Reynolds' music journalism, and they were also pivotal for the substyle of ambient pop. In the late 1990s and early 2000s, Bristol, England, emerged as a notable hub for post-rock, characterized by a loosely connected group of musicians (mainly Movietone, Crescent, Flying Saucer Attack and Third Eye Foundation) working with home-recording setups and a distinctly lo-fi aesthetic. Trip hop, which began as a scene in the same city, influenced Bristol's post-rock scene in the turn of the millennium. Bands in the scene initially released music on the local Planet label and Recreational Records before partnering with Domino.

American post-rock tended to drew on earlier experimental and avant-rock traditions while retaining the indie rock band form and its instrumental roles. Influences included jazz fusion (such as the "electric" era of Miles Davis), krautrock, space rock, minimalism, the Canterbury scene, and no wave, as well as the work of composers such as John Cage and Alvin Lucier. The second Tortoise album Millions Now Living Will Never Die made the band a post-rock icon according to music critics, with bands outside the city such as Ui and the Canadian band Do Make Say Think being regarded as recording music inspired by the Chicago school (also referred to as the "Windy City school" in Japanese music journalism). John McEntire of Tortoise and Jim O'Rourke (of Gastr del Sol) were prominent figures in the scene, with McEntire being a member of The Sea and Cake, and both musicians also contributing as producers on multiple albums by Stereolab throughout the 1990s and 2000s. Meanwhile, the band Cul de Sac, and bands from the Kranky label like Jessamine, Labradford, Bowery Electric, Stars of the Lid, and Windy & Carl, were contemporarily foundational to both the American first wave of post-rock and the space rock revival of the 1990s. Reynolds remarked in an essay of a November 1995 issue of The Wire that in total, these American bands were "rewiring rock according to the legacies of European space rock, avant jazz and Ambient sound design [sic]", counterculturally in contrast to "the spent forces of Grunge and lo-fi [sic]". Additionally, as part of Virgin Records' Ambient series, the double CD compilation Monsters, Robots and Bug Men: A User's Guide to the Rock Hinterland was released in 1996 to demonstrate the range of music being described as post-rock in music journalism, with many of the aforementioned acts appearing on it.

In 2000, Radiohead released the studio album Kid A, marking a significant turning point in their musical style. Reynolds described it and the 2001 follow-up album Amnesiac as major examples of post-rock in the style that had been established by the first wave, incorporating influences, stylings and structures from electronica, krautrock, jazz and space rock into the band's indie rock music; he noted that the success of the albums showed that the style had made a mainstream breakthrough.

=== 2000s–present: second wave ===
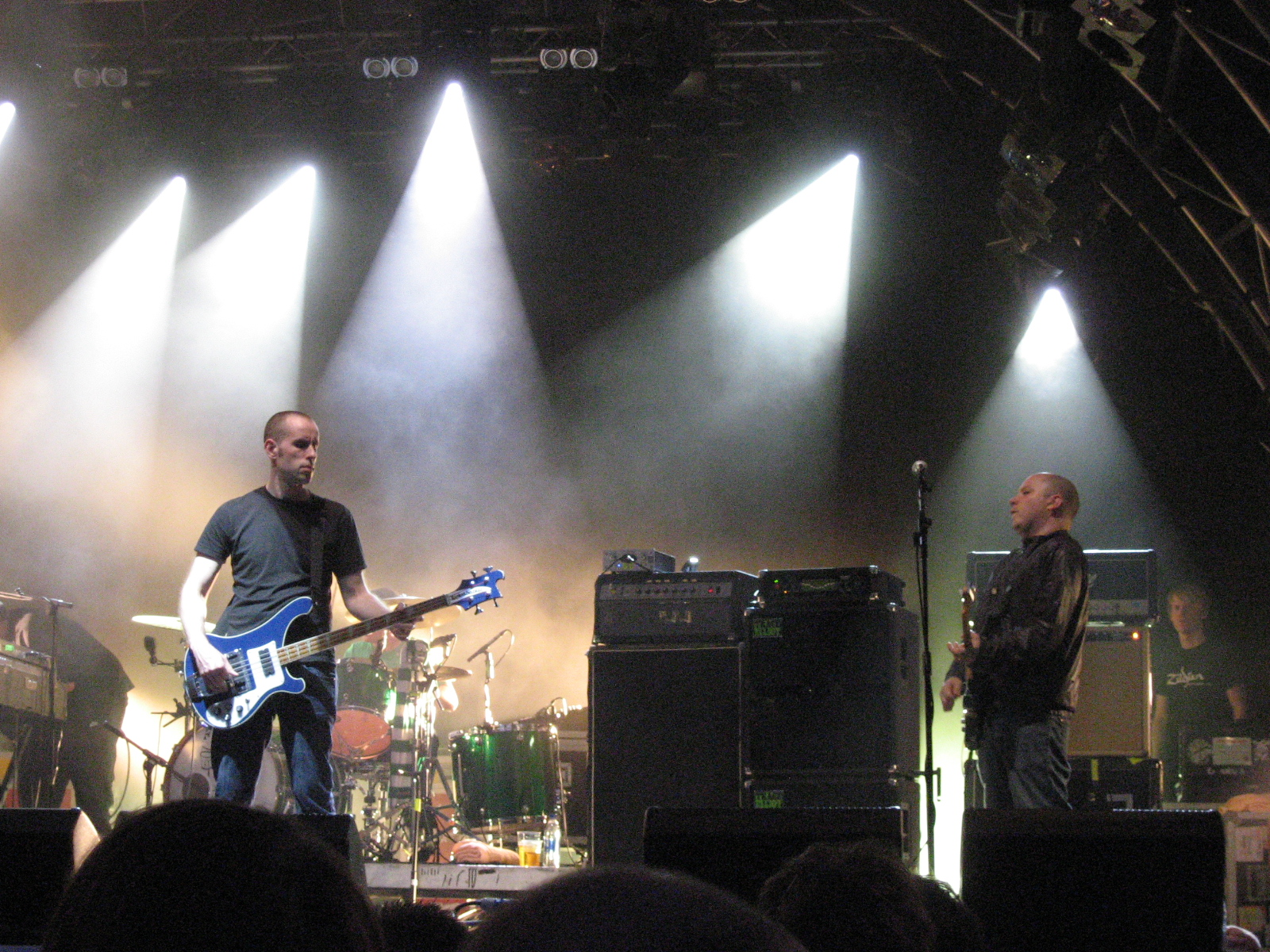
Mogwai performing in 2007

In the early 2000s, the term became divisive among music critics and musicians and was seen as falling out of favour. It became increasingly controversial as more critics outwardly condemned its use. Some of the bands for whom the term was most frequently assigned, including Cul de Sac, Tortoise, Mogwai, and Godspeed You! Black Emperor rejected the label. The wide range of styles the term covers, they and others have claimed, robbed it of its individuality. Kenny Bringelson, writing for Consequence, commented that the bands' music is "rife with creative recontextualization and categorically fresh sounds, but rarely does it transcend what's defined as, and cool about, rock music."

An eminent post-rock locale was Montreal, Canada, where Godspeed You! Black Emperor and related groups, including Silver Mt. Zion and Fly Pan Am, released music on Constellation Records; these groups are generally characterized by a melancholy and crescendo-driven style rooted in, among other genres, chamber music, musique concrète techniques and free jazz influences. Notable albums from Montrealer bands include F♯ A♯ ∞ (1997) and Lift Your Skinny Fists like Antennas to Heaven (2000), both by Godspeed You! Black Emperor, and Set Fire to Flames's Sings Reign Rebuilder (2001).

As part of the second wave of post-rock, the bands Godspeed You! Black Emperor, Sigur Rós, Mogwai, Explosions in the Sky, 65daysofstatic, This Will Destroy You, Do Make Say Think, and Mono became some of the more popular post-rock acts of the new millennium. Sigur Rós, a band known for their distinctive vocals, fabricated a language they called "Hopelandic" (Icelandic: Vonlenska), which they described as "a form of gibberish vocals that fits to the music and acts as another instrument". With the release of their album Ágætis byrjun in 1999, they became among the most well known post-rock bands of the 2000s due to the use of many of their tracks, particularly their 2005 single "Hoppípolla", in TV soundtracks and film trailers. These bands' popularity was attributed to a move towards a more conventional rock-oriented sound with simpler song structures and increasing utilization of pop hooks, also being regarded as a new atmospheric style of indie rock. Following a 13-year hiatus, experimental rock band Swans, who had been regarded as influencing post-rock, began releasing a number of albums that were described as post-rock, most notably To Be Kind, which was acclaimed by AllMusic at the end of 2014.

Wider experimentation and blending of other genres took hold in post-rock. For instance, bands such as Cult of Luna, Isis, Russian Circles, Palms, Deftones, and Pelican fused metal with second wave post-rock, with the resulting sound being termed post-metal. Sludge metal grew and evolved to include (and in some cases fuse completely with) some elements of post-rock, with this second wave of sludge metal being pioneered by bands such as Giant Squid and Battle of Mice. The label Neurot Recordings has released music by bands in this genre. Similarly, bands such as Altar of Plagues, Lantlôs and Agalloch blend second wave post-rock and black metal, incorporating elements of the former while primarily using the latter. In some cases, post-rock experimentation has extended beyond blending with a single genre—such as in post-metal—to embrace a wider range of influences. A notable example is blackgaze, a fusion of black metal and shoegaze, post-rock and post-hardcore, exemplified by bands like Deafheaven that combine intense metal elements with the atmospheric textures of post-rock.

== See also ==
- List of post-rock bands
- Post-metal

== Bibliography ==
- Leech, Jeanette (2017). Fearless: the Making of Post-Rock. Jawbone Publisher. ISBN 978-1-91-103615-9 – via the Internet Archive.
- Reynolds, Simon (2004). Cox, Christoph; Warner, Daniel (eds.). Audio Culture: Readings in Modern Music. New York: Continuum. ISBN 978-0-8264-1615-5 – via the Internet Archive.
