= Talk Talk discography =

- Studio albums: 5
- Extended plays: 1
- Live albums: 1
- Compilation albums: 8
- Singles: 25
- Video albums: 3
- Music videos: 13
- Remix albums: 4

English band Talk Talk released five studio albums, one live album, eight compilation albums, four remix albums, one EP, 25 singles, three video albums and 13 music videos. All of their studio albums were released under EMI/Parlophone Records with the exception of their final album, which was released under Verve/Polydor.

== Albums ==
=== Studio albums ===
Title	Album details	Peak chart positions										Certifications
Title	Album details	UK	AUS	CAN	GER	IT	NL	NZ	SWE	SWI	US	Certifications
The Party's Over	Released: 12 July 1982; Label: EMI; Formats: LP, MC	21	94	—	—	—	—	8	47	—	132	UK: Silver
It's My Life	Released: 13 February 1984; Label: EMI; Formats: LP, MC	35	—	59	4	10	3	27	49	2	42	GER: Gold; NL: Platinum
The Colour of Spring	Released: 17 February 1986; Label: EMI; Formats: CD, LP, MC	8	71	14	11	8	1	7	25	3	58	UK: Gold; CAN: Gold; NL: Gold
Spirit of Eden	Released: 12 September 1988; Label: Parlophone; Formats: CD, LP, MC	19	—	47	16	—	32	—	—	12	—	UK: Silver
Laughing Stock	Released: 16 September 1991; Label: Verve, Polydor; Formats: CD, LP, MC	26	—	—	65	—	60	—	—	—	—	
"—" denotes releases that did not chart or were not released in that territory.

=== Live albums ===
Title	Album details	Peak chart positions	
Title	Album details	UK Indie	GER
London 1986	Released: 1 March 1999; Label: Pond Life; Formats: CD	34	46
Force of Nature (unofficial)	Released: 10 March 2023; Label: Yellowin; Format: vinyl	—	—

=== Remix albums ===
Title	Album details	Peak chart positions			
Title	Album details	UK	GER	IT	NL
It's My Mix	Released: March 1985; Label: EMI; Formats: LP, MC; Italy and Canada-only release	—	—	18	—
Mini LP	Released: 1986; Label: EMI; Formats: LP, MC; Greece-only release	—	—	—	—
History Revisited: The Remixes	Released: 25 March 1991; Label: Parlophone/EMI; Formats: CD, LP, MC	35	27	—	64
12x12 Original Remixes	Released: 2 August 1999; Label: EMI; Formats: CD	—	—	—	—
"—" denotes releases that did not chart or were not released in that territory.

=== Compilation albums ===
Title	Album details	Peak chart positions						Certifications
Title	Album details	UK	GER	NL	NOR	NZ	SWI	Certifications
Natural History: The Very Best of Talk Talk	Released: 29 May 1990; Label: Parlophone; Formats: CD, LP, MC	3	10	16	—	20	—	UK: Gold; GER: Gold; NL: Gold
The Very Best of Talk Talk	Released: 27 January 1997; Label: EMI; Formats: CD	54	49	—	20	—	—	UK: Gold
Asides Besides	Released: 20 April 1998; Label: EMI; Formats: 2xCD	132	—	—	—	—	—	
The Collection	Released: 4 September 2000; Label: EMI; Formats: CD	—	—	—	—	—	—	
Missing Pieces	Released: 16 February 2001; Label: Pond Life; Formats: CD, MC	—	—	—	—	—	—	
Introducing... Talk Talk	Released: 28 July 2003; Label: EMI; Formats: CD	—	—	—	—	—	—	
Essential	Released: 12 September 2011; Label: EMI; Formats: CD, digital download	—	—	—	—	—	61	
It Never Ends	Released: 2012; Label: Real Moon Rec; Formats: CD, digital download	—	—	—	—	—	—	
Natural Order 1982–1991	Released: 14 January 2013; Label: EMI; Formats: CD, digital download	—	—	—	—	—	—	
"—" denotes releases that did not chart or were not released in that territory.

== Extended play ==
Title	EP details
Talk Talk	Released: August 1982; Label: EMI America; Formats: LP; US-only release

== Singles ==
Title	Year	Peak chart positions										Certifications	Album
Title	Year	UK	AUS	BEL (FL)	FRA	GER	IRE	NL	NZ	SWI	US	Certifications	Album
"Mirror Man"	1982	—	—	—	—	—	—	—	—	—	—		The Party's Over
"Talk Talk"	1982	52	33	—	—	—	—	—	—	—	—		The Party's Over
"Today"	1982	14	—	—	—	—	16	—	10	—	—		The Party's Over
"Talk Talk" (re-recorded)	1982	23	—	—	—	—	—	—	—	—	75		The Party's Over
"My Foolish Friend"	1983	57	—	—	—	—	—	—	—	—	—		Non-album single
"It's My Life"	1984	46	73	44	25	33	—	30	32	—	31	UK: Platinum	It's My Life
"Such a Shame"	1984	49	—	13	7	2	—	9	39	1	89		It's My Life
"Dum Dum Girl"	1984	74	—	33	—	20	—	31	34	24	—		It's My Life
"Another Word" (Note: "Another Word" was only released as a single in Continental Europe and the Philippines.)	1984	—	—	—	—	25	—	—	—	—	—		The Party's Over
"Tomorrow Started" (live) (Note: This live version of "Tomorrow Started", recorded in September 1984 at Ahoy Rotterdam, was only released as a single in the Netherlands.)	1984	—	—	—	—	—	—	—	—	—	—		Non-album single
"It's My Life" (reissue)	1985	93	—	—	—	—	—	—	—	—	—		It's My Life
"Life's What You Make It"	1985	16	70	14	49	24	17	11	11	17	90	UK: Silver	The Colour of Spring
"Living in Another World"	1986	48	—	21	44	34	—	22	—	23	—		The Colour of Spring
"Give It Up"	1986	59	—	32	—	—	—	—	—	—	—		The Colour of Spring
"I Don't Believe in You"	1986	96	—	—	—	—	—	—	—	—	—		The Colour of Spring
"I Believe in You"	1988	85	—	—	—	—	—	65	43	—	—		Spirit of Eden
"It's My Life" (2nd reissue)	1990	13	—	—	—	49	23	—	—	—	—		Natural History: The Very Best of Talk Talk
"Talk Talk" (reissue) (Note: An edit of the original version of "Talk Talk" was only reissued as a single in France.)	1990	—	—	—	—	—	—	—	—	—	—		Natural History: The Very Best of Talk Talk
"Life's What You Make It" (reissue)	1990	23	—	—	—	—	23	—	—	—	—		Natural History: The Very Best of Talk Talk
"Such a Shame" (reissue)	1990	78	—	—	—	—	—	—	—	—	—		Natural History: The Very Best of Talk Talk
"Living in Another World" (edit)	1991	79	—	—	—	—	—	—	—	—	—		History Revisited: The Remixes
"Life's What You Make It" (remix) (Note: This remixed version of "Life's What You Make It" was only released as a single in Continental Europe.)	1991	—	—	—	—	—	—	—	—	—	—		History Revisited: The Remixes
"After the Flood"	1991	106	—	—	—	—	—	—	—	—	—		Laughing Stock
"New Grass"	1991	107	—	—	—	—	—	—	—	—	—		Laughing Stock
"Ascension Day"	1991	111	—	—	—	—	—	—	—	—	—		Laughing Stock
"It's My Life" (Liquid People vs Talk Talk)	2003	64	—	—	—	—	—	—	—	—	—		Non-album single
"—" denotes releases that did not chart or were not released in that territory.

== Videography ==
=== Video albums ===
Title	Album details	Peak chart positions	
Title	Album details	UK	NL
Talk Talk	Released: 1984; Label: Sony/Picture Music International; Formats: VHS, Beta, LD; US and Japan-only release	—	—
Natural History: The Best of Talk Talk – A Video Selection	Released: May 1990; Label: Picture Music International; Formats: VHS	—	—
Live at Montreux 1986	Released: 13 October 2008; Label: Eagle Vision; Formats: DVD	23	13
"—" denotes releases that did not chart or were not released in that territory.

=== Music videos ===
Title	Year	Director	Album
"Talk Talk"	1982	Brian Grant	The Party's Over
"Today"	1982	Simon Milne	The Party's Over
"Talk Talk" (Version 2)	1982	Russell Mulcahy	The Party's Over
"My Foolish Friend"	1983	Brian Grant	Non-album single
"It's My Life"	1984	Tim Pope	It's My Life
"It's My Life" (Version 2)	1984	Tim Pope	It's My Life
"Such a Shame"	1984	Tim Pope	It's My Life
"Dum Dum Girl"	1984	Tim Pope	It's My Life
"Dum Dum Girl" (Version 2)	1984	Tim Pope	It's My Life
"Life's What You Make It"	1985	Tim Pope	The Colour of Spring
"Living in Another World"	1986	Tim Pope	The Colour of Spring
"Give It Up"	1986	Noel Oliver	The Colour of Spring
"I Believe in You"	1988	Tim Pope	Spirit of Eden
