= Asides Besides =

Compilation album by Talk Talk
- Released: 20 April 1998
- Recorded: 1981–1988
- Genre: Synthpop; art rock; post-rock
- Length: 142:46
- Label: EMI
- Producer: Tim Friese-Greene; Colin Thurston

Talk Talk chronology
Laughing Stock (1991)	Asides Besides (1998)	London 1986 (1999)

Asides Besides is a compilation album by Talk Talk, released on 20 April 1998. It is a collection of rarities, B-sides and demos previously unavailable on CD. It was issued as a companion volume to the band's 1997 album remasters and has been described as "[tying] up loose ends" in the band's career. The album received positive reviews. The album only contains tracks from the 1982–1988 period, as EMI could only obtain rights for Talk Talk music from this period. An album of rarities for Talk Talk's career after 1988 was released in 2001 as Missing Pieces.

== Background ==
Talk Talk released four studio albums on record label EMI in the 1980s, as well as numerous singles, an EMI-curated remix album (It's My Mix), and several EPs. Though the four studio albums were remastered onto CD in the 1980s (and again in 1997), the singles, remix album and EPs all contained B-sides and remixes that were not republished onto CD. A surge in Talk Talk's popularity arose following the 1997 aforementioned remasters of the band's catalogue, which was coupled with a new compilation album entitled The Very Best of Talk Talk, as well as new material from Mark Hollis and .O.rang. To capitalise on this, EMI decided to remaster and re-release all the previously unavailable songs on one double album.

== Songs ==
Disc one consists solely of remixes, all of which had only been available on 12" singles and were not available on CD at that time. New unauthorised Talk Talk remixes had been released on the 1991 compilation album History Revisited which the band disowned and tried to block the release of.

One notable omission was the 12" remix of "Why Is It So Hard?", a song recorded by Talk Talk for the soundtrack of the 1984 motion picture Firstborn directed by Michael Apted. The 12" remix of this song was only released on the Italian and Canadian 1985 remix album "It's My Mix".

Disc two opens with rare demo versions of "Talk Talk" (already featured in its extended form on disc one), "Mirror Man" and "Candy", all of which had appeared on a limited edition double 7" single of "Such a Shame".

The disc then progresses into B-sides in chronological order of release, from "Strike Up the Band" (the B-side to Talk Talk's first single "Mirror Man" from 1982) and ending with "John Cope", the B-side for "I Believe in You" from 1988.

Disc two also includes the single version of "Why Is It So Hard?" even though it was never released as a single or as a B-side. The version on this album is also slightly different to the version on the Firstborn soundtrack.

Disc two features three songs that had previously been available on CD. "My Foolish Friend", appeared on the 1990 retrospective album Natural History, but was not included in the 1997 CD remaster campaign. "John Cope" and the edited version of "Eden" appeared on the CD Single release of "I Believe In You".

"Call in the Night Boy (Piano Version)," "For What It's Worth", "It's Getting Late in the Evening" and "John Cope" later appeared on 2003's Introducing ... Talk Talk. All the remixes on disc one were reissued in 1999 as the standalone album 12 x 12 Original Remixes, which itself was reissued as Remixed in 2001.

== Reception ==
Professional ratings
Review scores
Source	Rating
Allmusic	4/5 stars

Chris Woodstra of Allmusic found that the 12 inch single remixes which comprise the first disc are of only marginal interest, but that the obscure tracks featured on the second disc stand up well even against the band's contemporary album tracks. He summarized, "Asides Besides can certainly be seen as a cash-in release to coincide with Mark Hollis' first solo release and the reissue of Talk Talk's EMI catalog, but rarely does such a calculated industry move result in such a treat for fans ... Asides Besides may be of interest only to diehard Talk Talk fans, but for that audience this collection is absolutely essential."

In a rundown of Talk Talk's discography, the BBC said that Asides and Besides was "a double CD set that includes many of the band's best 12" mixes and b-sides.", though they criticized the sloppy scans of the sleeve artwork for the singles.

In 2014, the NME ranked the album at number 9 in their list of "30 Killer B-Side and Rarities Albums".

== Track listing ==
The Longer Versions
No.	Title	Original release	Length
1.	"Talk Talk" (Extended Version)	"Talk Talk", March 1982	4:35
2.	"Today" (Extended Version)	"Today", June 1982	4:34
3.	"My Foolish Friend" (Extended Version)	"My Foolish Friend" (Extended Version), March 1983	5:30
4.	"It's My Life" (Extended Version)	"It's My Life", January 1984	6:19
5.	"Such a Shame" (Extended Version)	"Such a Shame", March 1984	7:01
6.	"Such a Shame" (Dub Mix)	"Dum Dum Girl", July 1984	6:34
7.	"Dum Dum Girl" (12" Mix)	"Dum Dum Girl", July 1984	5:24
8.	"Without You" (12" Mix)	"Dum Dum Girl", July 1984	5:55
9.	"Life's What You Make It" (Extended Mix)	"Life's What You Make It" (Extended Version), February 1986	7:01
10.	"Living in Another World" (Extended Remix)	"Living in Another World", March 1986	8:58
11.	"Pictures of Bernadette" (Dance Mix)	"Give It Up", May 1986	8:06
12.	"Happiness Is Easy" (12" Mix)	"I Don't Believe in You", November 1986	7:02

The Extra Tracks
No.	Title	Original release	Length
1.	"Talk Talk" (Demo)	"Such a Shame", March 1984	3:28
2.	"Mirror Man" (Demo)	"Such a Shame", March 1984	3:30
3.	"Candy" (Demo)	"Such a Shame", March 1984	4:25
4.	"Strike Up the Band"	"Mirror Man", February 1982	2:45
5.	"?"	"Talk Talk", March 1982	4:09
6.	"My Foolish Friend"	"My Foolish Friend", March 1983	3:20
7.	"Call in the Night Boy" (Piano Version)	"My Foolish Friend", March 1983	3:50
8.	"Why Is It So Hard?"	First release of 7" version	4:05
9.	"Again a Game... Again"	"Such a Shame", March 1984	4:12
10.	"Without You"	"Dum Dum Girl", July 1984	3:26
11.	"Dum Dum Girl" (US Mix)	"Dum Dum Girl", July 1984	3:40
12.	"It's Getting Late in the Evening"	"Life's What You Make It", February 1986	5:46
13.	"For What It's Worth"	"Living in Another World", March 1986	5:22
14.	"Pictures of Bernadette"	"Give It Up", May 1986	5:04
15.	"Eden" (Edit)	"I Believe in You", November 1988	4:22
16.	"John Cope"	"I Believe in You", November 1988	4:39
