= Clockdust =

2020 album by Rustin Man (Paul Webb)

Studio album by Rustin Man
- Released: 20 March 2020
- Length: 39:46
- Label: Domino
- Producer: Rustin Man

Rustin Man chronology
Drift Code (2019)	Clockdust (2020)

Singles from Clockdust
- 1. "Jackie's Room" Released: 3 February 2020; 2. "Kinky Living" Released: 20 March 2020

Clockdust is the third studio album by English musician and former Talk Talk bassist Paul Webb, under his moniker Rustin Man. It was released on 20 March 2020 through Domino Recording Company.

== Background and release ==
Clockdust originated during the same sessions as Webb's previous album, Drift Code. The first songs Webb wrote were "long arrangements that built up in layers to something sonically quite dense"; then, "as a reaction", he wrote a series of songs that were "tighter in their structure but had more feeling of space". Realizing he had enough material for two albums, the first set of songs became the core of Drift Code, while the second set became Clockdust.

The album's lead single was "Jackie's Room", with a music video directed by Edwin Burdis.

Alongside Clockdust, Webb also announced three live performances, his first since 2003 (with Beth Gibbons) and his first as a solo artist. For the shows, Webb was to be supported by five other musicians, several of which played on the Dez Mona album Hilfe Kommt that Webb produced in 2009. However, on 4 September 2020, the planned performances were cancelled due to the COVID-19 pandemic.

== Critical reception ==
Professional ratings
Aggregate scores
Source	Rating
Metacritic	83/100
Review scores
Source	Rating
AllMusic	4/5 stars
musicOMH	3.5/5 stars
Paste	7.8/10
PopMatters	8/10

Clockdust received positive reviews from critics. The aggregate review site Metacritic assigns a score of 83 out of 100 based on 8 reviews, indicating "universal acclaim".

Writing for AllMusic, Heather Phares wrote that the album "leans into [Drift Code]'s antiqued, lived-in feeling and takes it in its own intriguing directions", and that "[Webb] is in a league of his own when it comes to making the most of music's time-traveling, spell-casting powers, and like Drift Code before it, Clockdust proves that Rustin Man's music has only grown richer and more rewarding over the years." Chris White of musicOMH praised the album's "asymmetric rhythms and unconventional melodies", with comparisons to Syd Barrett and Tom Waits, and felt the album "hang[s] together in its own peculiar way", but "perhaps ultimately lacking the truly special, standout ingredients needed to elevate Webb’s solo work to the kind of rarefied levels he helped Talk Talk achieve." Michael Sumsion of PopMatters described the album as "steeped in wyrd-folk aesthetics and animated by exotic and unexpected flourishes", and applauded it as "another cohesive, gripping, and quirky statement that possesses its distinct character and feels detached from the contemporary soundscape. Other, higher-profile releases will command the lion's share of media noise in the coming months, but Clockdust is the sort of record whose myriad soothing charms and subtle depths will continue to resonate far beyond the click-bait."

== Track listing ==
Clockdust track listing
No.	Title	Length
1.	"Carousel Days"	4:10
2.	"Gold & Tinsel"	3:15
3.	"Jackie's Room"	3:33
4.	"Love Turns Her On"	4:13
5.	"Rubicon Song"	3:33
6.	"Old Flamingo"	4:47
7.	"Kinky Living"	4:45
8.	"Night in Evening City"	7:17
9.	"Man with a Remedy"	4:13
Total length:		39:46
