= Live at Montreux 1986 =

Video by Talk Talk
- Released: 13 October 2008
- Recorded: 11 July 1986, Montreux, Switzerland
- Genre: Rock, art rock, new wave
- Length: 87 mins
- Label: Eagle Vision
- Producer: Claude Nobs, Terry Shand, Geoff Kempin

Professional ratings
Review scores
| Source | Rating |
|---|---|
| DVD Talk | "highly recommended" |
| Music Headquarter | 8/10 stars |

Live at Montreux 1986 is a concert video release by the English band Talk Talk of a concert at 1986 Montreux Jazz Festival. The show was part of a tour that started in April 1986 to promote the band's recent album The Colour of Spring, and was to be their only appearance at Montreux, from their last tour. The video captures Talk Talk at the peak of their career.

For this tour, the usual trio of Mark Hollis (vocals), Paul Webb (bass), and Lee Harris (drums) was augmented by John Turnbull on guitar (who plays a Fender Stratocaster and Telecaster, as well as an electroacoustic guitar), two percussionists and two keyboardists. As often, de facto fourth band member Tim Friese-Greene did not play on stage with the band.

== Critical response ==
Bill Gibron, at DVD Talk, highly recommends the DVD, praising its "solid set list matched by equally effortless performance." He calls it "an excellent way to get introduced to one of the '80s best, and most baffling, acts." A German reviewer at Music Headquarter praises singer Mark Hollis for his charismatic performance and the band for their jazzy variations and improvisations. A reviewer at the German MSN website was less positive about Hollis' performance and appearance, complaining about the singer's well-known introversion and his penchant for hiding behind sunglasses, as well as the backdrop (Montreux's design was in the hands of Keith Haring in 1986) and the 1980s clothes worn by the band.

== Track listing ==
1. "Talk Talk" – 3:08
2. "Dum Dum Girl" – 3:44
3. "Call in the Night Boy" – 6:55
4. "Tomorrow Started" – 7:38
5. "My Foolish Friend" – 4:45
6. "Life's What You Make It" – 4:37
7. "Mirror Man / Does Caroline Know?" – 8:11
8. "It's You" – 4:02
9. "Chameleon Day / Living in Another World" – 7:55
10. "Give It Up" – 5:39
11. "It's My Life" – 6:52
12. "I Don't Believe in You" – 6:05
13. "Such a Shame" – 8:45
14. "Renée" – 7:53

== Personnel ==
Talk Talk

- Mark Hollis – lead vocals
- Paul Webb – bass, backing vocals
- Lee Harris – drums

Additional members

- John Turnbull – guitars, backing vocals
- Ian Curnow – synthesizers, organ, programming, piano
- Rupert Black – synthesizers, electric piano, drum machine
- Phil Reis – percussion
- Leroy Williams – percussion
