= London 1986 =

Live album by Talk Talk
- Released: 1 March 1999
- Recorded: 8 May 1986
- Venues: Hammersmith Odeon, London
- Genres: Rock; art rock; synth-pop; experimental rock
- Length: 56:13
- Label: Pond Life Records

Talk Talk chronology
Asides Besides (1998)	London 1986 (1999)	12x12 Original Remixes (1999)

Professional ratings
Review scores
Source	Rating
AllMusic	3/5 stars
NME	(7/10)

London 1986 is a live album by the English group Talk Talk, released in Europe by Pond Life Records on compact disc in 1999. It was recorded at the Hammersmith Odeon in London on 8 May 1986 near the end of their European tour to promote their 1986 studio album The Colour of Spring. The tour was the band's last, and the show was the band's last live performance in the UK, although they released two more studio albums in 1988 and 1991. Promotional copies released in 1998 were titled Hammersmith.

The album was met with moderately positive reviews upon its release. It is notable for capturing the band's transition period, when their sound was moving away from their earlier pop phase, from which the performances are mostly drawn, into their later experimental music. Another live release from 2022 contains four songs from the same live show.

The album is included in The Quietus' 2013 list of its writers' "40 Favourite Live Albums".

== Cover art ==
The cover artwork, by longtime collaborating artist James Marsh, was originally meant for a video documenting the same tour, and stills from the concert film, directed by Noel Oliver, are included in the album's liner notes. The international release was abandoned, however, and the video package only appeared in Italy. In 1990, one clip from the film, of the band performing "Give It Up", was included in the video album that accompanied the greatest-hits compilation Natural History: The Very Best of Talk Talk, and this was rereleased on DVD in 2007. The Hammersmith film has never been rereleased in its entirety. In 2008, the DVD Live at Montreux 1986 was released, consisting of the complete Montreux show from the same tour.

== Track listing ==
No.	Title	Writer(s)	Studio album	Length
1.	"Tomorrow Started"	Mark Hollis	It's My Life	7:52
2.	"Life's What You Make It"	Mark Hollis, Tim Friese-Greene	The Colour of Spring	4:31
3.	"Does Caroline Know?"	Mark Hollis	It's My Life	7:36
4.	"Living in Another World"	Mark Hollis, Tim Friese-Greene	The Colour of Spring	7:06
5.	"Give It Up"	Mark Hollis, Tim Friese-Greene	The Colour of Spring	5:55
6.	"It's My Life"	Mark Hollis, Tim Friese-Greene	It's My Life	6:29
7.	"Such a Shame"	Mark Hollis	It's My Life	9:02
8.	"Renée"	Mark Hollis	It's My Life	7:45

== Personnel ==
Talk Talk

- Mark Hollis – lead vocals
- Paul Webb – bass, backing vocals
- Lee Harris – drums

Additional personnel

- David Rhodes – guitar, backing vocals
- Danny Cummings – percussion
- Phil Reis – percussion
- Ian Curnow – keyboards
- Rupert Black – piano
- Mark Feltham – harmonica

Production

- Chris Beale – live sound
- Tim Friese-Greene, Mick McKenna – original recorded sound
- Bill Leabody – production manager
- Barry Mead – tour manager
- Adrian Wiseman, Glenn Saggers, Hoagie Davies – crew
- Keith Aspden – management
- Phill Brown – mixing
- Denis Blackham at Country Masters – mastering
- James Marsh – front cover illustration
- Noel Oliver – film stills
- Cally at Antar – graphic design
