= Drift Code =

Studio album by Rustin Man
- Released: 1 February 2019
- Length: 38:04
- Label: Domino
- Producer: Rustin Man

Rustin Man chronology
Out of Season (2002)	Drift Code (2019)	Clockdust (2020)

Singles from Drift Code
- 1. "Vanishing Heart" Released: 15 November 2018; 2. "Judgement Train" Released: 16 January 2019; 3. "Our Tomorrows" Released: 13 June 2019

Drift Code is the second studio album by English musician and former Talk Talk bassist Paul Webb, under his moniker Rustin Man. It was released on 1 February 2019 through Domino Recording Company.

== Background and recording ==
Shortly after finishing Out of Season, Webb began thinking about making a solo album. Songwriting and recording started in 2004, but was put on hold several times while Webb worked as a record producer for other artists. Webb finished mixing the songs in March 2018.

Drift Code was recorded at Webb's home, a converted barn in Essex. The instruments were recorded in a linear fashion: Webb recorded all the bass parts for the entire album before returning to the first track and going through the guitar parts, and so on for each instrument thereafter. Says Webb, "By the time I get around to the first song again, I haven’t heard that song for six months so I get a new kind of perspective each time I go back there."

Webb performed most of the instruments himself, and learned how to do so for the album; according to Webb, learning each instrument to "a decent enough standard" was the main reason behind the lengthy recording process. For strings and horns, he recruited local orchestral musicians. The album also features contribution from friends and family, including Lee Harris, Webb's former bandmate in Talk Talk and .O.rang, who played drums; and Snowboy, who brought and played his Clavioline keyboard.

== Critical reception ==
Professional ratings
Aggregate scores
Source	Rating
AnyDecentMusic?	7.5/10
Metacritic	79/100
Review scores
Source	Rating
AllMusic	4/5 stars
Exclaim!	7/10
The Guardian	5/5 stars
MusicOMH	4/5 stars
Paste	7.9/10
Pitchfork	7.6/10
PopMatters	7/10
Under the Radar	6.5/10

Drift Code received positive reviews from critics. The aggregate review site Metacritic assigns a score of 79 out of 100 based on 13 reviews, indicating "generally favorable reviews".

Heather Phares of AllMusic wrote that "the way Webb blends folk, jazz, classic vocal pop, psych and prog ... in combinations that are elegant but too strange to be tasteful echoes latter-day Talk Talk, but there's a rustic eccentricity to songs such as "Light the Light" and "Martian Garden" that makes this album singular even within his body of work", concluding "Drift Code is the sound of an artist coming into his own on his own time". Andy Crump of Paste wrote "what Webb has created is so rich, so delightfully off-kilter, that an auxiliary listen is necessary the same way another sip of pickleback is necessary". Jordan Blum of PopMatters said "although there could be more diversity and depth at times, the vast majority of Drift Code is mesmeric in its idiosyncratic splendor" and that "Webb and company excel at bringing his novel vision to life with retro charisma, modern creativity, and a timeless classiness that guarantees its relevancy and appeal for the foreseeable future". Writing for The Guardian, Michael Hann awarded it a perfect score, describing it as "seem[ing] to exist in a time of its own" and praising its "determination to find or found some timeless folk tradition of their own". In a mixed review, Megan Valley of Exclaim! praised the song "Vanishing Heart" as "near-perfect", but felt the album as a whole was "atmospheric and moody, but too often forgettable".

Several critics made particular mention of Webb's voice, noting that it was the first time he had sung lead in his musical career. Zach Schonfeld of Pitchfork described it as a "surprisingly commanding, unmistakably English warble"; Hann called it "attractively leathered"; and Crump said "depending on the song, and even on the verse, Rustin Man’s Paul Webb either sounds like an Appalachian mountain man singing through diastema or David Bowie". Ben Hogwood of MusicOMH thought Webb's voice "is likely to be a divisive factor", and that listeners would have to "work past the occasional awkwardness of the vocal", but added "there is no doubt that Webb sings directly from the heart". More critically, Valley also drew comparisons to David Bowie, but "even with the hint of familiarity, though, Webb's voice is a little flatter and a little less compelling."

== Track listing ==
All tracks are written by Paul Webb except where noted.

No.	Title	Writer(s)	Length
1.	"Vanishing Heart"		4:35
2.	"Judgement Train"		5:09
3.	"Brings Me Joy"		3:16
4.	"Our Tomorrows"	Paul Webb, Lee Harris	4:46
5.	"Euphonium Dream"		2:02
6.	"The World's in Town"		5:47
7.	"Light the Light"	Paul Webb, Lee Harris	4:36
8.	"Martian Garden"		4:38
9.	"All Summer"		3:06
Total length:			38:04

== Personnel ==
Adapted from the Drift Code liner notes.

- Rustin Man – vocals, piano, electric guitar, guitarrón, electric bass, Hammond organ, synthesizer, baritone guitar, electric piano, acoustic guitar, xylophone, twelve-string guitar, accordion, harmonica, sounds
- Catherine Chandler – violin, viola, viola d'amore
- Ginny Davis – cello
- Lee Harris — drums, sitar, Jew's harp, tambourine
- Stephanie Hedges – vocals on "Brings Me Joy"
- Nancy Lewis – flute
- T.J. Mackenzie — euphonium, trumpet, trombone, flugelhorn, French horn
- Snowboy — claviola, surdo, pandeiro, rattle, chimes
- Grace Webb – backing vocals on "The World's in Town"
- Sam Webb – vocals on "Judgement Train"
- Paul Webb – lyrics and writing
- James Yorkston — clarinet

=== Packaging ===
- Matthew Cooper – design
- Frans Florijn – photography
- Brett Price – photography

=== Production ===
- Lee Harris — engineer
- Guy Davis — mastering
- Sam Webb – engineer
- Paul Webb – engineer

== Charts ==
Chart	Peak position
Belgian Albums (Ultratop Flanders)	137
Dutch Albums (Album Top 100)	170
Scottish Albums (Official Charts)	73
UK Independent Albums (Official Charts)	8
