= The Collection (Talk Talk album) =

- Original 2000 release cover

Greatest hits album by Talk Talk
- Released: 4 September 2000
- Genre: Synthpop; art rock
- Label: EMI; Disky
- Producer: Tim Friese-Greene; Colin Thurston

Talk Talk chronology
| 12x12 Original Remixes (1999) | The Collection (2000) | Missing Pieces (2001) |

The Collection is a greatest hits album by English band Talk Talk, released on 4 September 2000. The album has been re-released various times. Originally released as "Talk Talk - The Collection", further versions of the album with the same track listing includes the repackaging of The Collection (1 December 2003), It's My Life: The Collection (2000), Popstars Of The 20th Century (2004) and The UltraSelection (2005).

As with all of the band's EMI compilations until 2013, the album was not a band sanctioned release.

== Track listing ==
1. "Talk Talk"
2. "It's My Life"
3. "Without You"
4. "Strike Up the Band"
5. "Life's What You Make It"
6. "It's Getting Late in the Evening"
7. "Pictures of Bernadette"
8. "Happiness Is Easy"
9. "The Last Time"
10. "I Don't Believe in You"
11. "It's You"
12. "Talk Talk" (demo)
13. "It's So Serious"
14. "The Party's Over"
15. "Dum Dum Girl"
16. "Candy"
