= Lives Outgrown =

Studio album by Beth Gibbons
- Released: 17 May 2024
- Recorded: Devon Barn; Bristol State of Art; Studio 53; Snap; Konk
- Genre: Chamber pop
- Length: 45:51
- Label: Domino
- Producer: Beth Gibbons; James Ford

Beth Gibbons chronology
Henryk Górecki: Symphony No. 3 (Symphony of Sorrowful Songs) (2019)	Lives Outgrown (2024)

Singles from Lives Outgrown
- 1. "Floating on a Moment" Released: 7 February 2024; 2. "Reaching Out" Released: 10 April 2024; 3. "Lost Changes" Released: 15 May 2024

Lives Outgrown is the second solo studio album by the English singer Beth Gibbons, released on 17 May 2024 through Domino Recording Company. It was produced by Gibbons, James Ford and Lee Harris. It was preceded by the singles "Floating on a Moment", "Reaching Out", and "Lost Changes". Lives Outgrown received critical acclaim, and was nominated for the 2024 Mercury Prize.

== Writing ==
Gibbons wrote Lives Outgrown over a decade, with topics specific to her walk of life nearing age 60, including "motherhood, anxiety, menopause, and mortality". Gibbons said it was influenced by the deaths of family and friends over the preceding several years and she "realised what life was like with no hope".

== Release ==
On 7 February 2024, Gibbons announced Lives Outgrown alongside its lead single, "Floating on a Moment". She released the second single, "Reaching Out", on 10 April. The third single, "Lost Changes", was released on 15 May.

== Critical reception ==
Professional ratings
Aggregate scores
Source	Rating
AnyDecentMusic?	8.4/10
Metacritic	88/100
Review scores
Source	Rating
AllMusic	4.5/5 stars
The Guardian	5/5 stars
Mojo	4/5 stars
NME	4/5 stars
The Observer	4/5 stars
Pitchfork	8.0/10
Record Collector	4/5 stars
The Skinny	4/5 stars
Slant Magazine	4.5/5 stars
Uncut	9/10

Lives Outgrown received a score of 88 out of 100 on review aggregator Metacritic based on 22 critics' reviews, which the website categorised as "universal acclaim". Uncut felt that "Lives Outgrown is a quite different prospect to Gibbons' previous work – more intimate, more personal, coloured by the grief and goodbyes she has weathered in recent years. But it is still possible to find a thread that runs from here to Out of Season, and back to Portishead." The Wire called it "timeless and considered" and "a complete, but still complicated, portrait of the intersection of grief and life", and Mojo wrote that while it can "all sound bleak[, ...] Lives Outgrown is also very beautiful".

The Skinny's Patrick Gamble described Lives Outgrown as "a haunting collection of torch songs" as well as "a record about departures and the transition to a new equilibrium". Charles Lyons-Burt of Slant Magazine said it "picks up where Portishead's 2008 album, Third, left off, with detail-rich orchestral chamber pop backing a stunning exploration of aging and grief" that is "as captivating as it is devastating". Record Collector's Johnnie Johnstone concluded that Lives Outgrown is "an album to fall deeply in love with. If you allow them to, these songs will envelop your soul."

Reviewing the album for AllMusic, Heather Phares described Lives Outgrown as "steeped in the emotional and physical realities of living long enough to bring life into the world and to see it leave ... Lives Outgrown reveals Gibbons' music is only getting richer as the years pass." Alexis Petridis from The Guardian also highlighted the growth: "A dispatch from the darker moments of middle age, Lives Outgrown is occasionally challenging, frequently beautiful and invariably gripping." Ben Cardew at Pitchfork noted the eclecticism, saying that: "Leftfield choices underscore the courageous and subtly unusual nature of Gibbons' album, which hides its eccentricity behind her deathless voice and sympathetic lyrical insight."

=== Year-end lists ===
Numerous critics and publications listed Lives Outgrown in their year-end ranking of the best albums of 2024.

Select year-end rankings for Lives Outgrown
Publication/critic	Accolade	Rank	Ref.
AllMusic	The AllMusic 2024 Year In Review	—N/a	
Alternative Press	50 best albums of 2024	—N/a	
Crack	The Top 50 Albums of 2024	34	
Double J	The 50 best albums of 2024	16	
The Economist	The Economist's pick of the best albums of 2024	—N/a	
The Line of Best Fit	The Best Albums of the Year	16	
The New York Times	Best Albums of 2024	7	
NPR Music	50 Best Albums of 2024	—N/a	
Mojo	75 Best Albums of 2024	3	
Mondo Sonoro	Los mejores discos internacionales de 2024	24	
NME	The 50 best albums of 2024	26	
Oor	OOR's Eindlijst 2024	9	
Paste	The 100 Best Albums of 2024	15	
PopMatters	The 80 Best Albums of 2024	24	
Rough Trade UK	Albums of the Year 2024	44	
Slant	The 50 Best Albums of 2024	16	
Time	The 10 Best Albums of 2024	1	
Uncut	80 Best Albums of 2024	3	

== Track listing ==
All tracks are written by Beth Gibbons; "Tell Me Who You Are Today", "Burden of Life", "Rewind", and "Beyond the Sun" written with Lee Harris.

Lives Outgrown track listing
No.	Title	Length
1.	"Tell Me Who You Are Today"	3:55
2.	"Floating on a Moment"	5:26
3.	"Burden of Life"	3:35
4.	"Lost Changes"	5:41
5.	"Rewind"	4:47
6.	"Reaching Out"	4:15
7.	"Oceans"	3:43
8.	"For Sale"	4:25
9.	"Beyond the Sun"	3:54
10.	"Whispering Love"	6:10
Total length:		45:51

== Personnel ==
Musicians

- Beth Gibbons – vocals (all tracks), backing vocals (tracks 1–9), acoustic guitar (1, 3–5, 9), guitar (2), vocoder (10)
- Lee Harris – drums (tracks 1–9), percussion (1, 3–6, 9, 10); daf, Mellotron (1); whistle (4), field recordings (10)
- James Ford – vibraphone (tracks 1, 2, 4), double bass (1, 2), piano (1, 3, 4, 6, 9), harmonium (1, 3, 9, 10), backing vocals (1, 5); Mellotron, spoons (1); cello (2–4, 6, 9), percussion (2, 4–9), bass (2, 4, 5, 7, 9), acoustic guitar (2, 4, 5, 9, 10), baritone guitar (2, 4, 5), flute (2, 4, 6–8), recorders (2, 4, 6, 7, 9), Hammond organ (2, 4), hammered dulcimer (2, 5), drums (2, 7, 8), pedal steel (2), Farfisa (3, 5, 9), dulcimer (4, 9, 10), electric guitars (4, 9); Solina, additional drums (4), bass clarinet (5, 6, 9, 10), feedback (5), guitars (6, 7); Chinese lute, synth piano, marching snare, trumpet, trombone (6); bowed saw (7, 9), EBow dulcimer (7), violin drones, acoustic bass (8, 10); 12-string acoustic guitar, resonator guitars (8); fuzz flute, violin, singing tubes (9); toms (10)
- Orchestrate – strings, woodwinds (tracks 1, 3); brass (1)
- Senab Adekunle – backing vocals (tracks 2, 4–6)
- Gracie – backing vocals (track 2), "instrumental ooh/hum" (10)
- Herbie – backing vocals (track 2)
- Roe – backing vocals (track 2)
- Raven Bush – violin (tracks 3–8, 10), viola (3–6), baritone viola (7, 8, 10), violin solo (8)
- William Rees – noise guitar (track 4)
- Robbie McIntosh – acoustic guitar (track 4)
- Howard Jacobs – bass saxophone, tenor saxophone, clarinets, percussion, frame drum, mizmar (track 6)

Technical

- Beth Gibbons – production, mixing, additional engineering; string arrangement (tracks 3–8), woodwind arrangement (3)
- James Ford – production, mixing, engineering; string arrangement (tracks 1, 3–8), woodwind arrangement (1, 3), brass arrangement (1)
- Lee Harris – additional production, additional engineering; string arrangement, woodwind arrangement, brass arrangement (track 1)
- Matt Colton – mastering
- Matt Jaggar – orchestra engineering
- Jimmy Robertson – additional engineering
- Tom Leach – additional engineering
- Billy Foster – additional engineering
- George Chung – orchestra engineering assistance
- Bridget Samuels – string arrangement, woodwind arrangement (tracks 1, 3); brass arrangement (1)

Visuals

- Netsi Habel – photography, cover photo
- Matthew Cooper – design

== Charts ==
Chart performance for Lives Outgrown
Chart (2024)	Peak position
Australian Albums (ARIA)	50
Austrian Albums (Ö3 Austria)	5
Belgian Albums (Ultratop Flanders)	11
Belgian Albums (Ultratop Wallonia)	4
Danish Albums (Hitlisten)	15
Dutch Albums (Album Top 100)	14
French Albums (SNEP)	13
German Albums (Offizielle Top 100)	5
Irish Albums (IRMA)	96
Italian Albums (FIMI)	69
Japanese Hot Albums (Billboard Japan)	67
New Zealand Albums (RMNZ)	37
Polish Albums (ZPAV)	69
Portuguese Albums (AFP)	9
Scottish Albums (OCC)	4
Spanish Albums (Promusicae)	36
Swedish Physical Albums (Sverigetopplistan)	9
Swiss Albums (Schweizer Hitparade)	4
UK Albums (OCC)	7
UK Independent Albums (OCC)	1
