= 12x12 Original Remixes =

12x12 Original Remixes / Remixed

Remix album by Talk Talk
- Released: 2 August 1999 (12x12 Original Remixes); 16 April 2001 (Remixed)
- Recorded: 1981–1988
- Genre: Synthpop; new wave; experimental rock
- Length: 76:55
- Label: EMI

Talk Talk chronology
London 1986 (1999)	12x12 Original Remixes / Remixed (1999)	The Collection (2000)

12x12 Original Remixes is an EMI series of remix albums including Talk Talk (as well as Thomas Dolby and Talking Heads), initially released on 2 August 1999 and again on 16 April 2001 with new artwork and packaging, retitled as Remixed. It contains the same collection of tracks as Disc One of the earlier album Asides Besides.

It is the third remix album of Talk Talk songs, following It's My Mix from 1985 and the controversial History Revisited from 1991. The album cover is a collage of various images associated with the band's previous albums. It features the same style Talk Talk logo as on History Revisited, the hanging goose from Asides Besides, the butterfly "face" from The Colour of Spring, the canary from The Very Best of Talk Talk, the tree of birds from Spirit of Eden, as well as numerous other animal related images. Remixed, the 2001 edition, features more simplistic graphic artwork of blue and orange circles on the cover.

== Reception ==
Allmusic described the cover as "ugly collage work". Allmusic gave the album, saying that, despite the content being good, "you'd be better off shelling out the extra cash for Asides Besides. You'd be getting everything this disc offers, in addition to its second disc of demos and excellent B-sides.

== Track list ==
1. "Talk Talk" (extended mix) – 4:34
2. "Today" (extended mix) – 4:33
3. "My Foolish Friend" (extended mix) – 5:30
4. "It's My Life" (extended mix) – 6:19
5. "Such a Shame" (extended mix) – 7:01
6. "Dum Dum Girl" (12" mix) – 5:23
7. "Without You" (12" mix) – 5:55
8. "Life's What You Make It" (extended mix) – 7:01
9. "Living in Another World" (extended remix) – 8:58
10. "Pictures of Bernadette" (dance mix) – 8:06
11. "Happiness Is Easy" (12" mix) – 7:03
12. "Such a Shame" (dub mix) – 6:32
