= Dez Mona =

Belgian band

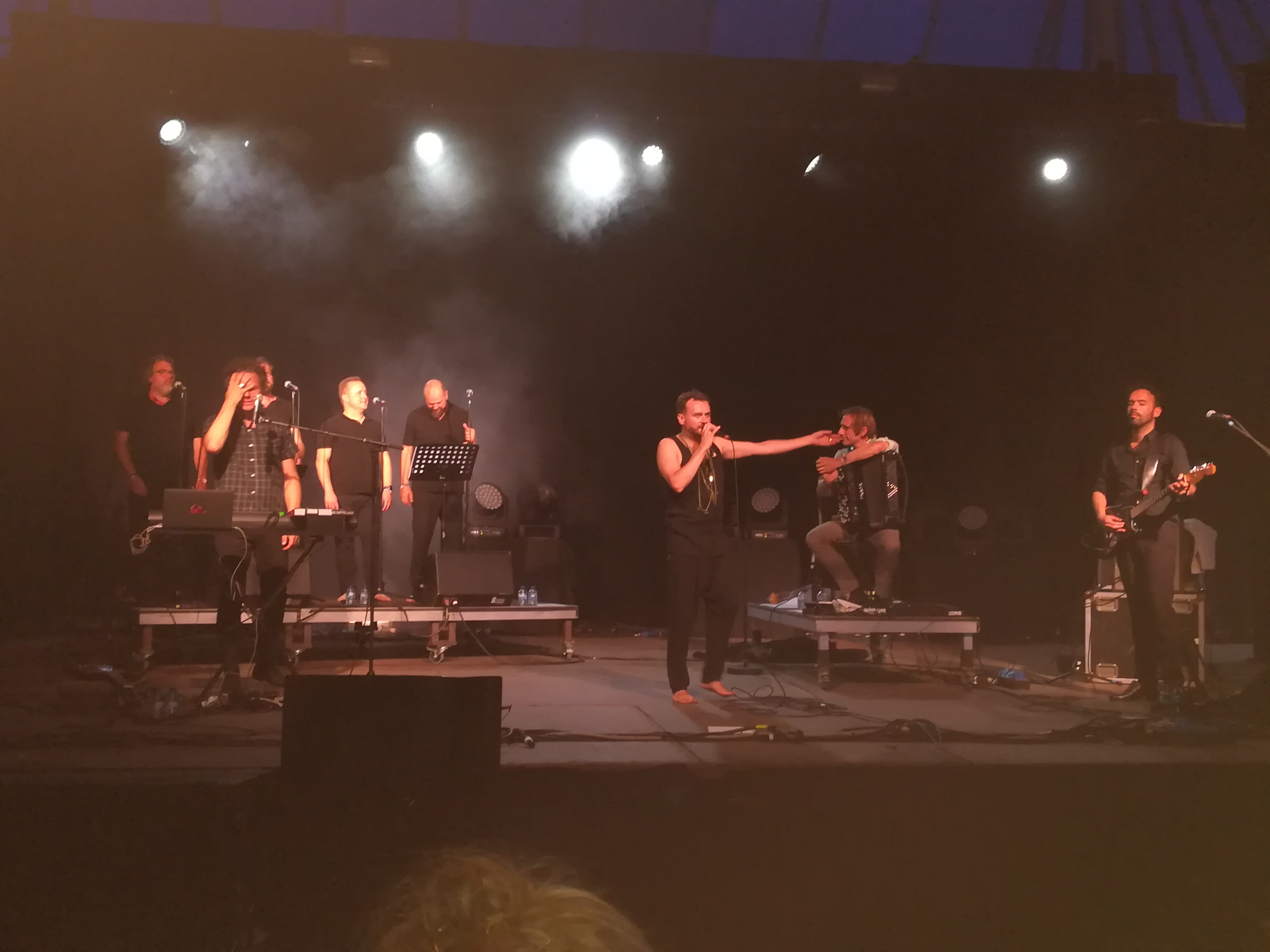

Dez Mona is a Belgian band formed in 2003, playing a combination of jazz, gospel, spirituals and drama. The band revolves around singer Gregory Frateur and bassist Nicolas Rombouts. The duo is sometimes joined by Sam Vloemans on trumpet and Roel van Camp on accordion.

The band's third album, Hilfe Kommt, was produced by former Talk Talk bassist Paul Webb.

== Discography ==
- Moments of Dejection Or Despondency (2007), Radical Duke
- Hilfe Kommt (2009), 62TV
- Pursued Sinners (2010)
- Saga (2011)
- A Gentleman's Agreement (2012)
- The Red Piece (2013)
- Origin (2015)
- Book of Many (2019)
