= The Deanes =

Location
- Daws Heath Road; Thundersley, Essex, SS7 2TD; England; 51.56798°N 0.5995°E

Information
- Type: Academy
- Local authority: Essex County Council
- Trust: South East Essex Academy Trust
- Department for Education URN: 143639 Tables
- Ofsted: Reports
- Head of School: Frankie Johnson
- Executive Headteacher: Desi McKeown
- Gender: Co-educational
- Age: 11 to 16
- Website: thedeanes.academy

The Deanes (formerly The Deanes School) is a co-educational secondary school located in Thundersley in the English county of Essex.

== History ==
The school takes its name from an area of forest called The Deanes Wood – so called because it was owned by the Dean of St Paul's Cathedral. West Wood, as it is now known, immediately adjoins the school to the south-east. The wood is now owned by Castle Point Borough Council.

In September 2013 Essex County Council announced their intention to close The Deanes School due to falling pupil numbers. There was considerable opposition to the proposed closure from local residents, and in February 2014 the Schools Adjudicator ruled that the school would remain open.

In February 2015 it was announced that the school had been awarded a grant from the government's priority schools building programme. The grant was used for the school science block including the ICT, arts and food technology departments.

Previously a foundation school administered by Essex County Council, in October 2016 The Deanes School converted to academy status and was renamed The Deanes. The school is now sponsored by the South East Essex Academy Trust

== Academics ==
The Deanes offers GCSEs and BTECs as programmes of study for pupils. In addition the school offers The Duke of Edinburgh's Award programme.

== Notable former pupils ==
- Louisa Brownfield, netballer
- Lee Harris, musician
- Paul Webb, musician
- Jacquelene Willmott, Olympic swimmer
