= Henryk Górecki: Symphony No. 3 (Symphony of Sorrowful Songs) =

2019 studio album by Beth Gibbons

Live album by Beth Gibbons, the Polish National Radio Symphony Orchestra and Krzysztof Penderecki
- Released: 29 March 2019
- Recorded: 29 November 2014
- Length: 48:53
- Language: Polish
- Label: Domino
- Producer: Beth Gibbons

Beth Gibbons chronology
Out of Season (2002)	Henryk Górecki: Symphony No. 3 (Symphony of Sorrowful Songs) (2019)	Lives Outgrown (2024)

Henryk Górecki: Symphony No. 3 (Symphony of Sorrowful Songs) is a live album by English musician Beth Gibbons in collaboration with the Polish National Radio Symphony Orchestra conducted by Krzysztof Penderecki, released on 29 March 2019 through Domino Recording Company. A performance of Polish composer Henryk Górecki's Symphony No. 3, it was recorded in Warsaw on 29 November 2014. The album received acclaim from critics.

== Critical reception ==
Professional ratings
Aggregate scores
Source	Rating
AnyDecentMusic?	8.0/10
Metacritic	84/100
Review scores
Source	Rating
AllMusic	4/5 stars
Exclaim!	8/10
The Guardian	4/5 stars
MusicOMH	4.5/5 stars
Pitchfork	8.0/10
PopMatters	8/10
Q	4/5 stars
Tiny Mix Tapes	3.5/5 marks
Uncut	8/10
Under the Radar	9/10
Mojo	4/5 stars

Henryk Górecki: Symphony No. 3 (Symphony of Sorrowful Songs) received a score of 84 out of 100 on review aggregator Metacritic based on 13 critics' reviews, indicating "universal acclaim". Uncut felt that Gibbons "brings Gorecki's great classical prayer to life beautifully, an expression of empathy that feels deep and profound", while Mojo commented that "Gibbons rises to the occasion". Q called it "a thing of grief-blasted beauty, and Gibbons brings tender pain to these words of lost children and mothers, her voice rising and falling impressively to the occasion".

== Track listing ==
Henryk Górecki: Symphony No. 3 (Symphony of Sorrowful Songs) track listing
No.	Title	Length
1.	"Symphony No. 3: I. Lento – Sostenuto tranquillo ma cantabile"	24:39
2.	"Symphony No. 3: II. Lento e largo – Tranquillissimo"	8:18
3.	"Symphony No. 3: III. Lento – Cantabile – Semplice"	15:56
Total length:		48:53

== Charts ==
Chart performance for Henryk Górecki: Symphony No. 3 (Symphony of Sorrowful Songs)
Chart (2019)	Peak position
Austrian Albums (Ö3 Austria)	58
Belgian Albums (Ultratop Flanders)	23
Belgian Albums (Ultratop Wallonia)	36
French Albums (SNEP)	78
German Albums (Offizielle Top 100)	25
Portuguese Albums (AFP)	28
Scottish Albums (Official Charts)	15
Swiss Albums (Schweizer Hitparade)	44
UK Albums (Official Charts)	35
UK Independent Albums (Official Charts)	5
