= Today (Talk Talk song) =

1982 Single by Talk Talk

Single by Talk Talk

from the album The Party's Over
- B-side: "It's So Serious"
- Released: 21 June 1982
- Genre: Dance-pop
- Length: 3:30
- Label: EMI
- Songwriters: Simon Brenner; Lee Harris; Mark Hollis; Paul Webb
- Producer: Colin Thurston

Talk Talk singles chronology
"Talk Talk" (1982)	"Today" (1982)	"Talk Talk (Reissue)" (1982)

Music video
- "Today" on YouTube

"Today" is a song by English band Talk Talk released by EMI on 21 June 1982 and is the third single from their debut album The Party's Over. It was the band's first top 20 hit and was their second ever biggest hit, peaking at number 14 on the UK Singles Chart.

== Versions ==
The 7" version of "Today" is a slight edit of the album version. However, this is not mentioned anywhere on the release. It was included on the 1997 compilation The Very Best of Talk Talk, entitled "Today (Single Version)".

The 12" B-side song, "It's So Serious", is from a BBC radio session, recorded for the David Jensen Show in November 1981, and was produced by John Sparrow. Similar to the 7" single, there is no mention of the fact that "Today" is an extended version or that "It's So Serious" is from a BBC radio session.

In the Netherlands, "It's So Serious" was released as the A-side, with "Today" as the B-side.

== Critical reception ==
Upon its release, Adrian Thrills of the NME called "Today" "wispy synthipop meets candyfloss psychedelia". He noted the "more airy, almost secular feel" in comparison to the band's previous two "heavy-handed tub-thumping" singles. He continued, "As a result, they at least sound a little less like a surrogate Duran Duran and more like themselves. 'Today' stands a chance [of becoming a hit], if only for Mark Hollis's distinctive, dreamy vocal delivery."

== Track listings ==
7": EMI / EMI 5314 (UK)

1. "Today" – 3:13
2. "It's So Serious" – 3:19

12": EMI / 12 EMI 5314 (UK)

1. "Today" – 4:27
2. "It's So Serious" – 4:16

== Charts ==
Chart (1982–83)	Peak position
Ireland (IRMA)	16
New Zealand (Recorded Music NZ)	10
UK Singles (OCC)	14
