= Introducing... Talk Talk =

Compilation album by Talk Talk
- Released: 28 July 2003
- Recorded: 1981–1988
- Genre: Art rock; post-rock; synthpop; experimental rock; alternative dance; ambient
- Length: 67:21
- Label: EMI

Talk Talk chronology
| Missing Pieces (2001) | Introducing... Talk Talk (2003) |

Introducing... Talk Talk is a compilation album by Talk Talk released on 28 July 2003 (one of many "best of" albums by the band released by coincidence the same year). Introducing... Talk Talk is slightly different from the other "best of" albums by the band in that it doesn't include any of the band's hits. The first five tracks come from the 1982–1984 period, including a piano version of "Call in the Night Boy", originally titled "Call in the Night Boys" as the B-side of the 1983 non-album single My Foolish Friend. Whilst the remaining seven tracks cover 1986–1988, the EMI era of the band's more experimental phase, most songs in this part of the album are drawn from The Colour of Spring and Spirit of Eden. Nothing post-1988 is featured, as EMI, who released the album, couldn't collect material from Laughing Stock or Missing Pieces, both recorded over 1990–1991, or the live album London 1986, released by Pond Life in 1999.

== Reception ==
Allmusic said in their 3/5 review that the album had a "bizarre" track list, but "this will be ideal for fans who want cheap access to some of the group's best B-sides without breaking for the extensive and more expensive Asides Besides.

== Track list ==
1. "Have You Heard the News?" – 5:07
2. "Candy" – 4:41
3. "Renée" – 6:21
4. "Tomorrow Started" – 5:58
5. "Call in the Night Boy" (Piano version) – 3:52
6. "For What It's Worth" – 5:21
7. "Happiness Is Easy" – 6:33
8. "April 5th" – 5:52
9. "It's Getting Late in the Evening" – 5:48
10. "Desire" – 7:04
11. "John Cope" – 4:41
12. "I Believe in You" – 6:03

"Desire" is cut short of 13 silent seconds. The song actually finishes at around 6:55 on both Spirit of Eden and any compilation which features it, including Introducing... Talk Talk, and around 23 silent seconds follow until the song reaches 7:17. On this album however, only around 9 silent seconds follow, leaving the song at 7:04.
