= Give It Up (Talk Talk song) =

1986 song by Talk Talk

Single by Talk Talk

from the album The Colour of Spring
- B-side: "Pictures of Bernadette"
- Released: 6 May 1986
- Length: 5:16
- Label: Parlophone
- Songwriters: Mark Hollis; Tim Friese-Greene
- Producer: Tim Friese-Greene

Talk Talk singles chronology
"Living in Another World" (1986)	"Give It Up" (1986)	"I Don't Believe in You" (1986)

"Give It Up" is a song by English band Talk Talk, released by Parlophone on 6 May 1986 as the third single from the band's third studio album The Colour of Spring. The song was written by Mark Hollis and Tim Friese-Greene, and produced by Friese-Greene. "Give It Up" peaked at number 59 in the UK Singles Chart.

== Critical reception ==
Upon its release as a single, Jim Reid of Record Mirror described "Give It Up" as "well polished, airbrushed even" and commented that "I can see their appeal as light purveyors of ambient pop". He added, "Trouble is, the mood, the sound never seems to change. They're better than Tears for Fears though." The Huddersfield Daily Examiner felt the song's elevation to single status resulted in the band "continu[ing] in the laidback psychedelic groove" and commented, "'Give It Up' takes a few listens, and as such might not have the impact of 'Life's What You Make It'. Still, it's a goodie." Dave Henderson of Sounds recommended that readers stick with The Colour of Spring album instead, stating that "in isolation this meagre ballad is hardly worth the trouble, but in the context of their sound, it's a fitting part of the spectacle".

In his 2019 retrospective "Celebrating the Genius of Mark Hollis in 15 Songs", Ryan Leas of Stereogum described it as "emblematic of the soulful and organ-drenched sound" of The Colour of Spring and noted Hollis' voice for how "he could take a simple and empty phrase like 'give it up' and make it feel profound in his reading of it".

== Track listing ==
7–inch single (UK, Europe and New Zealand)

1. "Give It Up" – 5:16
2. "Pictures of Bernadette" – 5:00

7–inch single (Canada)

1. "Give It Up" (Edited version) – 4:59
2. "Pictures of Bernadette" – 5:00

12–inch single (UK, Europe, Canada and New Zealand)

1. "Give It Up" – 5:16
2. "Pictures of Bernadette" (Dance-Mix) – 8:00
3. "Pictures of Bernadette" (7" version) – 5:00

12–inch promotional single (US)

1. "Give It Up" (Edited version) – 4:59
2. "Give It Up" – 5:16

== Personnel ==
Credits are adapted from The Colour of Spring CD liner notes and the 12-inch single sleeve notes.

"Give It Up"

- Mark Hollis – vocals, piano, mellotron
- Paul Webb – bass
- Lee Harris – drums
- Robbie McIntosh – dobro
- David Rhodes – guitar
- Tim Friese-Greene – organ
- Ian Curnow – instrumental
- Martin Ditcham – percussion

Production

- Tim Friese-Greene – producer

Other

- James Marsh – illustration

== Charts ==
Chart (1986)	Peak position
Belgium (Ultratop 50 Flanders)	32
Netherlands (Tipparade)	9
UK Singles (Official Charts)	59
