= Missing Pieces (Talk Talk album) =

Compilation album by Talk Talk
- Released: 16 February 2001
- Recorded: 1990–1991, 1998
- Genres: Art rock; experimental rock
- Length: 55:27
- Label: Pond Life

Talk Talk chronology
The Collection (2000)	Missing Pieces (2001)	Introducing... Talk Talk (2003)

Missing Pieces is a 2001 compilation album by Talk Talk. The first six tracks are the A- and B-Sides of the three CD singles released in 1991 for their final album Laughing Stock. Four of these are versions of album tracks, with the addition of the otherwise uncollected B-Sides "Stump" and "5:09". The final track, "Piano", was recorded pseudonymously by Mark Hollis (as "John Cope", the title of the B-Side of their 1988 single "I Believe in You" from the album Spirit of Eden) for the 1998 album "AV 1" by Allinson / Brown, which was produced by former Talk Talk producer Phill Brown. According to Hollis, it was designed to cycle indefinitely for a Dave Allinson/Phill Brown art exhibition and is presented twice in a row on the CD. Missing Pieces was released in 2001 to a generally mixed to positive reception.

The album artwork was designed by James Marsh as were all the other Talk Talk record covers.

== Reception ==
Professional ratings
Review scores
Source	Rating
AllMusic	3/5 stars
Leonard's Lair	3/5 stars

Leonard's Lair gave 3/5 stars, with "5:09" listed as the album highlight. The mixed score was because "if many more tenuous releases see the light of day there's a danger of that impression being cheapened." AllMusic also gave it a 3/5 star review, despite the review being more positive.

== Track listing ==
No.	Title	Writer(s)	Notes	Length
1.	"After the Flood"	Mark Hollis & Tim Friese-Greene	A-Side (Outtake)	4:14
2.	"Myrrhman"	Mark Hollis & Tim Friese-Greene	B-Side	5:36
3.	"New Grass"	Mark Hollis & Tim Friese-Greene	A-Side	9:36
4.	"Stump"	Mark Hollis, Tim Friese-Greene & Lee Harris	B-Side	4:45
5.	"Ascension Day"	Mark Hollis & Tim Friese-Greene	A-Side	6:04
6.	"5:09"	Mark Hollis & Tim Friese-Greene	B-Side	5:14
7.	"Piano"	John Cope (Mark Hollis)		14:40

== Personnel ==
- Mark Hollis – vocal, guitar, piano, organ
- Lee Harris – drums
- Tim Friese Greene – organ, piano, harmonium
- Mark Feltham – harmonica
- Martin Ditcham – percussion
- Levine Andrade, Stephen Tees, George Robertson, Gavyn Wright, Jack Glickma, Garfield Jackson, Wilfred Gibson – viola
- Simon Edwards, Ernest Mothle – acoustic bass
- Roger Smith, Paul Kegg – cello
- Henry Lowther – trumpet, flugel horn
- Dave White – contra bass clarinet

Production

- Phill Brown – engineering (Tracks 1–6), production (Track 7)
- Tim Friese-Greene – production (Tracks 1–6)
- James Marsh – cover art
