= I Don't Believe in You =

1986 song by Talk Talk

Single by Talk Talk

from the album The Colour of Spring
- B-side: "Does Caroline Know (Live Version)"
- Released: 10 November 1986
- Length: 5:02
- Label: Parlophone
- Songwriters: Mark Hollis; Tim Friese-Greene
- Producer: Tim Friese-Greene

Talk Talk singles chronology
"Give It Up" (1986)	"I Don't Believe in You" (1986)	"I Believe in You" (1988)

"I Don't Believe in You" is a song by English band Talk Talk, released by Parlophone on 10 November 1986 as the fourth and final single from the band's third studio album The Colour of Spring. The song was written by Mark Hollis and Tim Friese-Greene, and produced by Friese-Greene. "I Don't Believe in You" peaked at number 96 in the UK Singles Chart. No music video was released for the single.

== Release ==
The B-side, "Does Caroline Know", was recorded live at the Montreux Jazz Festival in the summer of 1986. The original studio version of the track was featured on Talk Talk's 1984 album It's My Life.

== Critical reception ==
Upon its release as a single, Roy Wilkinson of Sounds wrote, "Sounding just a mite too similar to 'Life's What You Make It', this continues the quality of Talk Talk's recent spate of subdued, carefully structured sketches in melancholia. They have an icy control of their genre and a surety of purpose that puts you in mind of Steely Dan." Andy Strickland of Record Mirror described the song as "yet another measured piece of acoustic, heart-rending pop from the most subtle of the British pop giants". He noted the melody "will sound familiar" and added that the dangerously Dire Straits-ish guitar solo means it's a cut below, say, 'Life's What You Make It'". Max Bell of Number One commented, "Talk Talk fans may disagree but when I hear Hollis's brooding adenoidal dramas I feel like giving him a handkerchief. The band's textures are as haunting as ever and I don't mind the old fashioned echoes of Procol Harum and Traffic. I just wish he'd blow his nose." Music & Media selected it as one of their "records of the week" in their 22 November 1986 issue and described the song as "bluesy".

== Track listing ==
7–inch single (UK, Europe and Canada)

1. "I Don't Believe in You" – 5:02
2. "Does Caroline Know" (Live version) – 8:09

12–inch single (UK and Europe)

1. "I Don't Believe in You" – 5:02
2. "Does Caroline Know" (Live version) – 8:09
3. "Happiness Is Easy" (12" mix) – 7:02

== Personnel ==
Credits are adapted from The Colour of Spring CD liner notes and the 12-inch single sleeve notes.

"I Don't Believe in You"

- Mark Hollis – vocals
- Paul Webb – bass
- Lee Harris – drums
- Robbie McIntosh – guitar
- Tim Friese-Greene – piano
- Steve Winwood – organ
- Gaynor Sadler – harp
- Morris Pert – percussion
- David Roach – soprano saxophone
- Ian Curnow – instrumental

"Does Caroline Know"

- Mark Hollis – vocals
- Paul Webb – bass
- Lee Harris – drums
- John Turnbull – guitar
- Rupert Black, Ian Curnow – keyboards
- Phil Reis, Leroy Williams – percussion

Production

- Tim Friese-Greene – producer ("I Don't Believe in You", "Happiness Is Easy"), mixing ("Does Caroline Know")
- Paul Webb, Lee Harris – mixing ("Happiness Is Easy")

Other

- James Marsh – illustration

== Charts ==
Chart (1986)	Peak position
UK Singles (Official Charts)	96
