= The Party's Over (Talk Talk album) =

Studio album by Talk Talk
- Released: 12 July 1982
- Recorded: 1981–1982
- Genres: Synth-pop; sophisti-pop
- Length: 36:28
- Label: EMI
- Producer: Colin Thurston

Talk Talk chronology
The Party's Over (1982)	It's My Life (1984)

Singles from The Party's Over
- 1. "Mirror Man" Released: 5 February 1982; 2. "Talk Talk" Released: 5 April 1982; 3. "Today" Released: 21 June 1982

Professional ratings
Review scores
Source	Rating
AllMusic	3.5/5 stars
Q	2/5 stars
Mojo (re-issue review)	2/5 stars
Smash Hits	5.5/10 stars
Uncut	2/5 stars

The Party's Over is the debut album by Talk Talk, released in 1982 by EMI Records.

== Release ==
The Party's Over was released on 12 July 1982 by EMI Records.

In the United Kingdom, the album's single "Today" was a top-twenty hit. The re-recorded and re-produced version of the single "Talk Talk" reached number 1 in South Africa in 1983 and number 23 in the UK.

In the United States, the album reached number 132 on the Billboard 200. The single "Talk Talk" reached number 63 on the Dance Club Songs chart and number 26 on the Mainstream Rock chart, but peaked at number 75 on the Billboard Hot 100.

In New Zealand, the album was a hit, peaking at number 8 due to the success of "Today", which reached number 10 in 1983.

== Critical reception ==
Upon its release, Smash Hits reviewer Neil Tennant wrote: "One sad mood permeates the whole LP as though they're compensating for the fact that they'd like to say something important but can't think of anything to say. Still, attractive tunes and synthesizer phrases plus sliding bass-playing prosper in the big, careful production. If only they'd cheered up, the part[y] might have been much more enjoyable." In the Trouser Press Guide to New Wave Records (1983), Karen Schlosberg found the album "slick and professional but lifeless", bemoaning its "melodramatic angst and amateurish lyrics", adding that "The band shares a double name, producer (Colin Thurston) and superficial veneer with Duran Duran, but hasn't any of the other band's panache or underlying passion."

In a retrospective review for AllMusic, Chris Woodstra felt the album was "slavishly derivative, Duran Duran-styled new romantic synth pop", but that it had a "naïve charm that makes for some really enjoyable music". Cristiano Orlando of Ondarock drew comparisons to OMD and Japan, while adding, "Within the grooves of The Party's Over one can sense agitation, abyssal reflection, moments that have the merit of unfolding with remarkable ease and engagement – far more so than the vast majority of similar records released in those years."

== Track listing ==
Side one
No.	Title	Writer(s)	Length
1.	"Talk Talk"	Ed Hollis, Mark Hollis	3:20
2.	"It's So Serious"	Simon Brenner, Lee Harris, M. Hollis, Paul Webb (Note: Per the original sleeve notes, which additionally delineate the credit for the song as "Lyrics - Hollis, Music - Brenner/Harris/Hollis/Webb". However, BMI records list all five Talk Talk songs credited to Brenner/Harris/Hollis/Webb (the four on The Party's Over plus the non-album B-side "Call in the Night Boy") as being written by Brenner and Hollis only. See BMI Work numbers 1313128, 1524648, 1155289, 530291, and 170255.)	3:19
3.	"Today"	Brenner, Harris, M. Hollis, Webb	3:28
4.	"The Party's Over"	Brenner, Harris, M. Hollis, Webb	6:10
Total length:			16:17

Side two
No.	Title	Writer(s)	Length
5.	"Hate"	Brenner, Harris, M. Hollis, Webb	3:56
6.	"Have You Heard the News?"	M. Hollis	5:05
7.	"Mirror Man"	M. Hollis	3:18
8.	"Another Word"	Webb	3:12
9.	"Candy"	M. Hollis	4:40
Total length:			20:11 36:28

Note: the original US vinyl swaps the positions of "Today" and "Hate".

== Personnel ==
Credits adapted from original European LP liner notes, unless otherwise noted.

Talk Talk

- Mark Hollis – vocals
- Lee Harris – drums
- Paul Webb – bass guitar
- Simon Brenner – keyboards

Technical

- Colin Thurston – producer, engineer; mixing (2, 7, 8)
- Mike Robinson – mixing
- James Marsh – cover painting
- Bill Smith – design
- Ron McMaster – mastering

== Charts ==
Chart (1982)	Peak position
Australia (Kent Music Report)	94
UK (Official Charts Company)	23
Billboard Pop Albums	132

Chart (2025)	Peak position
Hungarian Physical Albums (MAHASZ)	13

== Certifications ==
Region	Certification	Certified units/sales
United Kingdom (BPI)	Silver	60,000^{^}
Summaries
Worldwide	—	250,000
^{^} Shipments figures based on certification alone.
