= Beth Gibbons =

British singer (born 1965)

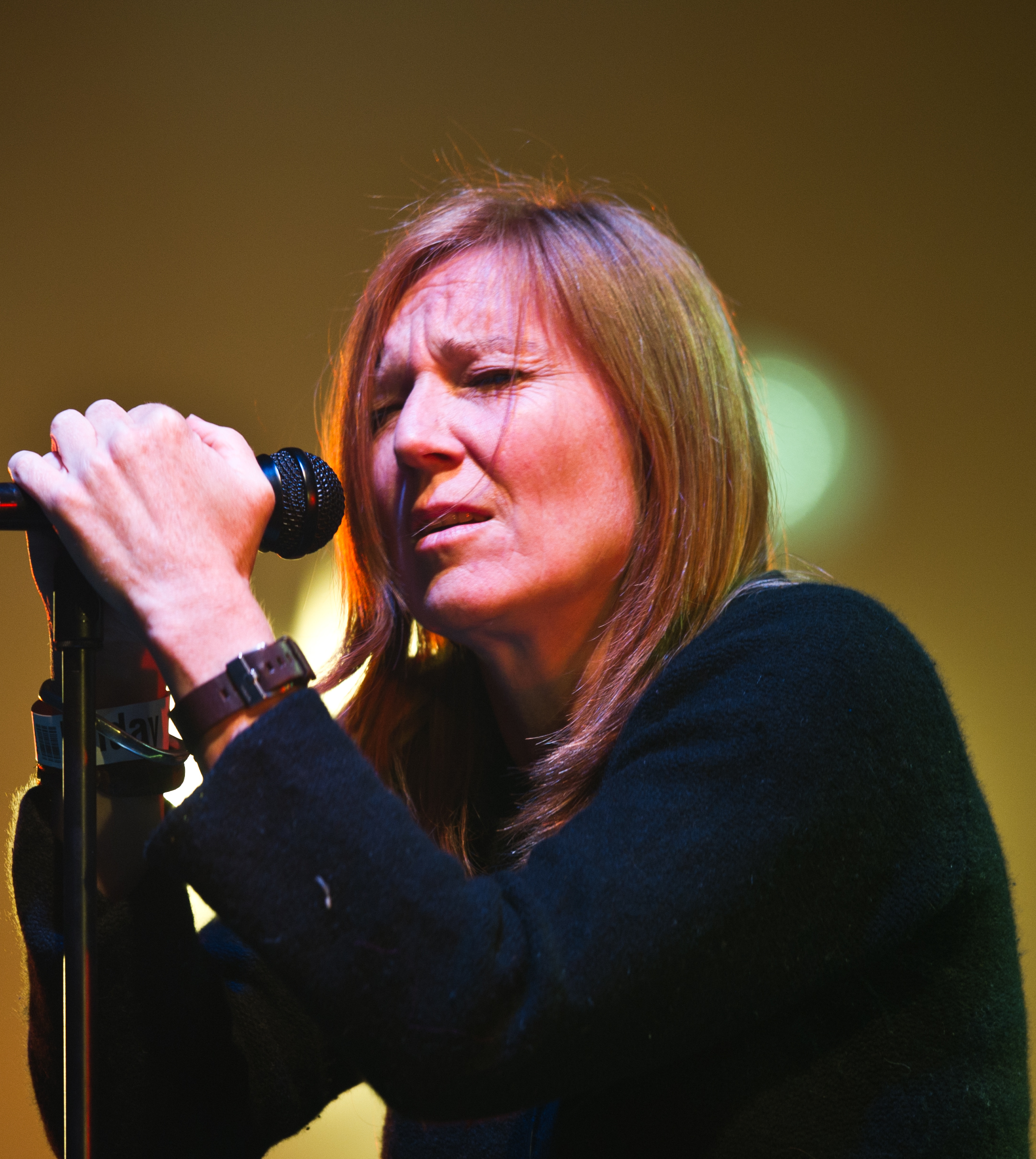
- Gibbons at Roskilde Festival 2011

Background information
- Born: 4 January 1965 (age 61); Exeter, Devon, England
- Genres: Trip hop; alternative rock; alternative folk
- Occupations: Singer; songwriter
- Years active: 1991–present
- Labels: Go! Beat; Domino Recording Company; Sanctuary
- Member of: Portishead
- Website: bethgibbons.net

Beth Gibbons (born 4 January 1965) is an English singer and songwriter. She is the singer and lyricist for the band Portishead, who have released three albums. She released an album with fellow English musician Rustin Man, Out of Season, in 2002, and a recording of contemporary Polish composer Górecki's Symphony No. 3 in 2019 with the Polish National Radio Symphony Orchestra. In 2024, she released her first solo album without collaboration, Lives Outgrown. The album received critical acclaim and was nominated for the 2024 Mercury Prize.

== Early life ==
Gibbons was born in Exeter, Devon, England and raised on a farm with three sisters. Her parents divorced when she was young. She attended St Katherine's School in Pill, Somerset.

At 22, she moved to Bath. To pursue her singing career, she then moved to Bristol, where she met Geoff Barrow, her future collaborator in Portishead, on an Enterprise Allowance course in 1991.

== Career ==
With Adrian Utley, Gibbons and Barrow released the first Portishead album Dummy in 1994 and have produced two other studio albums, a live album, and various singles since.

She has also collaborated on a separate project with former Talk Talk bassist Paul Webb (Rustin Man). Before she joined Geoff Barrow in Portishead, she had auditioned for the singer's slot in .O.rang, the group formed by Webb and Lee Harris after Talk Talk's late-Eighties departure from EMI, but Portishead's sudden success pre-empted matters. In October 2002, they released the album Out of Season in the United Kingdom under the name Beth Gibbons and Rustin Man. The album peaked at number 28 in the UK Albums Chart. It was released in the United States a year later: while touring in North America, Variety favourably described her performance with Rustin as "Billie Holiday fronting Siouxsie and the Banshees".

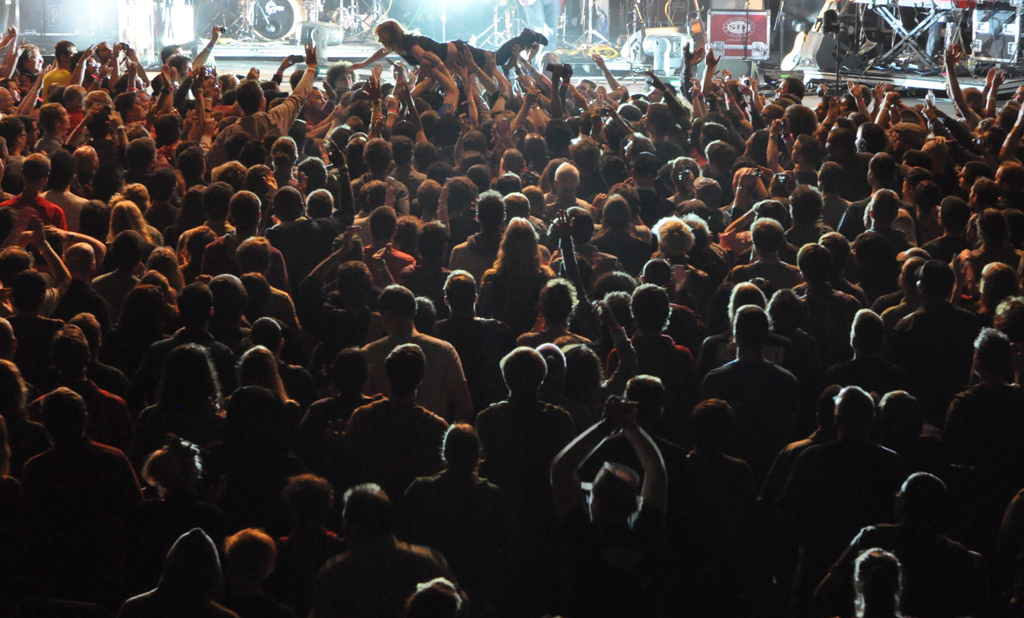
Gibbons crowdsurfing in 2011

Gibbons was also a judge for the 10th annual Independent Music Awards to support independent artists' careers.

In June 2013, Gibbons announced plans for a new solo album with Domino Records. She contributed vocals to a cover of the song "Black Sabbath" with the British metal band Gonga, released on 24 April 2014.

In 2018, Gibbons contributed vocal performances, along with Elizabeth Fraser of the Cocteau Twins, to the Spill Festival held in Ipswich in an audio installation entitled 'Clarion Calls', which uses the voices of 100 women to commemorate the 100th anniversary of the end of World War I.

In 2014, Gibbons performed Symphony No. 3 by Henryk Górecki with the Polish National Radio Symphony Orchestra, conducted by Krzysztof Penderecki. Gibbons sang in Polish. The performance was released in 2019; reviewing the album for Pitchfork, Jayson Greene wrote: "Part of the tension comes from hearing her untrained voice scale these rocky heights. Her vibrato, tight and trilling and barely controlled, sounds an awful lot like someone fighting off a panic attack. This would get her dismissed from a traditional opera audition, probably, but it is magnificently effective at sending raw shudders through what can be a pretty well-worn work." In 2022, Gibbons featured on the track "Mother I Sober" from Kendrick Lamar's album Mr. Morale & the Big Steppers. For her collaboration in the album she received a nomination for Album of the Year at the 65th Annual Grammy Awards as a featured artist and songwriter.

On 7 February 2024, Gibbons announced the release of her first solo studio album in over 20 years. The album, titled Lives Outgrown, was released 17 May 2024. It was announced alongside a single titled "Floating on a Moment", with its second single "Reaching Out" being released later that year on 10 April.

== Style and inspiration ==
Gibbons has cited Edith Piaf, Billie Holiday, Nina Simone, Bono of U2 for his performance on The Joshua Tree, Otis Redding and Jimmy Cliff as inspirations. She has covered Janis Joplin songs and enjoys the music of Janis Ian.

== Discography ==
Year	Album	Notes
1994	Dummy	Portishead
1997	Portishead	Portishead
1998	Roseland NYC Live	Portishead
2002	Out of Season	With Rustin Man
2008	Third	Portishead
2019	Henryk Górecki: Symphony No. 3 (Symphony of Sorrowful Songs)	With Polish National Radio Symphony Orchestra
2024	Lives Outgrown	Solo album

=== Other works ===
Year	Song	Album	Artist
1994	"Orang"	Herd of Instinct	.O.rang
1996	"Jalap"	Fields and Waves	.O.rang
2004	"Lonely Carousel"	Cinema	Rodrigo Leão
2004	"Strange Melody"	Rendez-Vous	Jane Birkin
2004	"Killing Time"	Mind Body & Soul	Joss Stone
2004	"Love Is a Stranger"	Fried	Fried
2005	"Mysteries"	The Russian Dolls	Rustin Man
2005		L'Annulaire	Diane Bertrand
2006	My Secret	Fictions	Jane Birkin
2006	Requiem for Anna	Monsieur Gainsbourg Revisited	Portishead
2007	"Sing"	Songs of Mass Destruction	Annie Lennox
2008		Diane Bertrand (director)	Baby Blues soundtrack
2010	"Prospera's Coda"	Elliot Goldenthal	The Tempest soundtrack
2012	"GMO"	Key to the Kuffs	JJ Doom
2014	"Black Sabbath"		Gonga
2017		Mandela Effect	Gonjasufi
2022	"Mother I Sober"	Mr. Morale & the Big Steppers	Kendrick Lamar
