= Out of Season (Beth Gibbons and Rustin Man album) =

2002 studio album

Studio album by Beth Gibbons and Rustin Man
- Released: 28 October 2002
- Genres: Folk, jazz, classic pop
- Length: 43:46
- Label: Go Beat!
- Producers: Beth Gibbons; Paul Webb

Beth Gibbons chronology
Out of Season (2002)	Henryk Górecki: Symphony No. 3 (Symphony of Sorrowful Songs) (2019)

Rustin Man chronology
Out of Season (2002)	Drift Code (2019)

Professional ratings
Aggregate scores
Source	Rating
Metacritic	83/100
Review scores
Source	Rating
AllMusic	4/5 stars
Blender	3/5 stars
Entertainment Weekly	B+
The Guardian	5/5 stars
Los Angeles Times	4/4 stars
Pitchfork	5.7/10
Q	4/5 stars
Slant Magazine	4.5/5 stars
Spin	B+
The Village Voice	B−

Out of Season is a studio album by vocalist Beth Gibbons (of Portishead) and musician Paul Webb (under the pseudonym Rustin Man, formerly of Talk Talk). It was released on 28 October 2002 in the United Kingdom and on 7 October 2003 in the United States. Out of Season is largely a folk album with jazz leanings, with Gibbons and Webb drawing more directly on the influences of Nina Simone, Billie Holiday, and Nick Drake, at which Portishead's work in trip hop only hinted. Out of Season also features contributions from Gibbons' fellow Portishead bandmate Adrian Utley and Webb's former bandmate Lee Harris. The first track of the album, "Mysteries", appears on the original soundtrack of the French movie Les Poupées Russes (The Russian Dolls), and in Wim Wenders' Palermo Shooting from 2008. The album achieved a silver certification from the BPI.

== Commercial performance ==
The album charted in some countries, peaking at number 28 in the UK, number 13 in Germany, number 36 in Switzerland, number 54 in Austria, number 19 in France, number 77 in Netherlands, number 6 in Norway and number 39 in Denmark. "Tom the Model" was released as a single on March 3, 2003, and reached number 70 in the UK. A video for the song was directed by Chris Bran and it featured Gibbons performing in front of a theatre crowd. The album was re-released in October 2019 on vinyl and entered the British charts at number 24.

== Track listing ==
All songs written by Beth Gibbons and Paul Webb, except where noted otherwise.

1. "Mysteries" – 4:39
2. "Tom the Model" – 3:41
3. "Show" (Gibbons) – 4:26
4. "Romance" – 5:09
5. "Sand River" (Webb) – 3:48
6. "Spider Monkey" – 4:10
7. "Resolve" – 2:51
8. "Drake" – 3:54
9. "Funny Time of Year" – 6:48
10. "Rustin Man" – 4:20

American edition bonus track

11. "Candy Says" (live) (Lou Reed) – 5:20

== Personnel ==
Musicians

- Beth Gibbons – acoustic guitar, arrangements, vocals, vocoder
- Paul Webb – percussion, piano, accordion, arrangements, electric guitar, keyboards, backing vocals
- Rebecca Lublinski – flute
- Rachel Samuel – cello
- John Baggott – piano, Wurlitzer
- Gary Baldwin – organ
- John Barclay – flugelhorn
- Martyn Barker – percussion, conga
- Mark Berrow – violin
- Rachael Brown – backing vocals
- Lurine Cato – backing vocals
- Ben Chappell – cello
- Clive Deamer – drums, tympani
- Philip Dukes – viola
- Simon Edwards – bass guitar, double bass
- Mark Feltham – harmonica
- Andrew Findon – alto flute
- Pete Glenister – acoustic guitar
- Leo Green – horn Section
- Lee Harris – drums
- Nick Ingman – conductor, orchestration
- Mitchell John – backing vocals
- Patrick Kiernan – violin
- Boguslaw Kostecki – violin
- Peter Lale – viola
- Martin Loveday – cello
- Neill MacColl – acoustic guitar, Ebow
- Perry Mason – violin
- Lorraine McIntosh – backing vocals
- Frank Ricotti – vibraphone
- Eddie Roberts – violin
- Nina Robertson – alto flute
- Joy Rose – backing vocals
- Mary Scully – double bass
- Chris Tombling – violin
- Jonathan Tunnell – cello
- Adrian Utley – organ, acoustic guitar, bass, guitar, electric guitar, Moog synthesizer, Ebow, baritone guitar
- Bruce White – viola
- Dave Woodcock – violin
- Gavyn Wright – violin
- Warren Zielinski – violin

Production

- Frank Arkwright – mastering
- Ryan Art – design
- Mark Bishop – mixing assistant, assistant
- Phill Brown – engineer, mixing
- Peter Dickinson – photography
- Niven Garland – engineer
- Beth Gibbons – producer, engineer
- Andy Montgomery – engineer
- Neil Perry – engineer
- Albert Pinheiro – assistant
- Adrian Utley – additional production, engineer, effects
- Eva Vermandel – photography
- Paul Webb – producer, mixing, effects

== Charts ==
2002–2003 weekly chart performance for Out of Season
Chart (2002–2003)	Peak position
Austrian Albums (Ö3 Austria)	54
Danish Albums (Hitlisten)	39
Dutch Albums (Album Top 100)	77
French Albums (SNEP)	19
German Albums (Offizielle Top 100)	13
Norwegian Albums (VG-lista)	6
Swiss Albums (Schweizer Hitparade)	36
UK Albums (Official Charts)	28

2024 weekly chart performance for Out of Season
Chart (2024)	Peak position
Belgian Albums (Ultratop Flanders)	177

== Certifications ==
Certifications for Out of Season
Region	Certification	Certified units/sales
Denmark (IFPI Danmark)	Gold	10,000^{‡}
United Kingdom (BPI)	Silver	60,000^{^}
^{^} Shipments figures based on certification alone.^{‡} Sales+streaming figures based on certification alone.
