= .O.rang =

English experimental music project

- Also known as: 'O'rang
- Origin: London, England
- Genres: Post-rock
- Years active: 1992–1996
- Label: The Echo Label
- Spinoff of: Talk Talk
- Past members: Lee Harris; Paul Webb

.O.rang (or 'O'rang) was an English experimental music project led by former Talk Talk members Lee Harris and Paul Webb, with a shifting cast of guest musicians. Among other elements, the project draws on dub, Krautrock, post-rock, and world fusion music.

== History ==
.O.rang's music exhibits more culturally diverse influences than Talk Talk. Webb has commented "We used to be in a reggae band when we were younger... The Talk Talk thing was always very Westernized, and we were listening to other kinds of world music."

The group's first album, Herd of Instinct (1994), was recorded similarly to Talk Talk's later albums: guest musicians played hours of improvisational material, then the performances were edited down and pieced together. However, in contrast to Talk Talk, the song structures were not planned before being recorded. Paul Webb explained, "it was recorded before it was written." Guests on the album included former Bark Psychosis leader Graham Sutton and Portishead singer Beth Gibbons (who at the time applied to become the group's singer, before Portishead's growing success removed this possibility).

After several false starts, a second album - 1996's Fields and Waves - was recorded. This album was more Krautrock-oriented and more structured in terms of composition, as well as being more focused around the core duo of Webb and Harris.

An album with the working title of Loudhailer No. 19 was projected for release in 2001, but remains unreleased.

== Discography ==
=== Albums ===
- Herd of Instinct (1994)
- Fields and Waves (1996)

=== EPs ===
- Spoor EP (1994) UK No. 176

=== Singles ===
- Orang / Anaon, The Oasis (1994)
- P53 (Boymerang Mix) (1997)
