= Talk Talk (Talk Talk song) =

- October 1982 UK vinyl reissue

Single by Talk Talk

from the album The Party's Over
- B-side: "?"
- Released: 5 April 1982
- Genre: Synth-pop; dance-pop; new wave
- Length: 3:23
- Label: EMI
- Songwriters: Mark Hollis; Ed Hollis
- Producer: Colin Thurston

Talk Talk singles chronology
"Mirror Man" (1982)	"Talk Talk" (1982)	"Today" (1982)

Audio
- "Talk Talk" on YouTube

"Talk Talk" is a song by the English band Talk Talk released by EMI on 5 April 1982. The second single from their debut album, The Party's Over (1982), it peaked at no. 52 in the United Kingdom upon initial release. A re-recorded and re-produced 7-inch version of the song was released later that year on 25 October 1982, peaking at no. 23 in the UK and no. 75 in the U.S. Billboard Hot 100 (also entering the Top 40 in the Billboard Mainstream Rock). The single also reached no. 1 in South Africa in 1983.

The song was originally recorded by Talk Talk singer Mark Hollis's previous band, The Reaction, as "Talk Talk Talk Talk", on the Beggars Banquet punk compilation Streets.

== Critical reception ==
Covering Talk Talk's best songs in an article in The Guardian, Graeme Thomson wrote: "Talk Talk is surging, superior synth-pop, its surface fizz – glistening slabs of electro-drama, funky slap bass and modish cries of "hey, hey!" – sparkling over hidden depths. The piano break has the grandeur of early material from the Waterboys, while the lyrics stake out what will become common themes: existential wariness, a mistrust of language and an overpowering sense of outsiderness." The song was used in a key scene in the 1982 film, Night Shift, starring Michael Keaton and Henry Winkler.

== Charts ==
Weekly charts for the original version
Chart (1982)	Peak position
Australia (Kent Music Report)	33
UK Singles (OCC)	52
US Billboard Hot 100	75
US Billboard Hot Dance Club Play	63
US Billboard Top Tracks	26
US Cash Box Top 100	88

Weekly charts for the re-recorded version
Chart (1982–1983)	Peak position
South Africa (Springbok Radio)	1
UK Singles (OCC)	23

== Track listing ==
April 1982 release

1. Talk Talk – 3:20
2. ? – 4:02

October 1982 release

1. Talk Talk – 2:58 (re-recorded and re-produced)
2. Mirror Man – 3:21
