= Paul Webb =

British musician (born 1962)

- Also known as: Rustin Man
- Born: Paul Douglas Webb; 16 January 1962 (age 64); Southend-on-Sea, Essex, England
- Genres: Post-rock; art rock; synthpop; new wave
- Occupation: Musician
- Instruments: Bass; vocals; guitar; keyboards
- Years active: 1981–present
- Formerly of: Talk Talk; .O.rang
- Website: www.rustinman.com

Paul Douglas Webb (born 16 January 1962), also known by the stage name Rustin Man, is an English musician. He was the bassist for the English band Talk Talk and spin-off group .O.rang.

== Biography ==
Webb attended The Deanes School in Thundersley, Essex, with drummer Lee Harris, and they became good friends. They played in the reggae band Eskalator before being recruited to form Talk Talk in 1981. Webb played bass for Talk Talk until 1988. His composition "Another Word" from the album The Party's Over is the only Talk Talk song not written or co-written by vocalist Mark Hollis.

In the early 1990s, he and Harris formed .O.rang. In the early 2000s, he adopted the name "Rustin Man" and collaborated with Beth Gibbons on Out of Season (2002).

He also produced the James Yorkston album The Year of the Leopard (2006), and the Dez Mona album Hilfe Kommt (2009).

His second album under the Rustin Man moniker, Drift Code, was released on 1 February 2019 on Domino Records. On 3 February 2020, he announced his third album, Clockdust, and his first live shows since 2003. For the shows, Webb was to be supported by five other musicians, several of whom played on Hilfe Kommt. On 4 September 2020, the planned performances were cancelled due to the COVID-19 pandemic.

== Discography ==
=== Solo ===
- Out of Season (2002, with Beth Gibbons)
- Drift Code (2019)
- Clockdust (2020)

=== Talk Talk ===
- The Party's Over (1982)
- It's My Life (1984)
- The Colour of Spring (1986)
- Spirit of Eden (1988)

=== .O.rang ===
- Herd of Instinct (1994)
- Spoor EP (1994)
- Fields and Waves (1996)
