= Lee Harris (drummer) =

English drummer and musician (born 1962)

- Born: Lee David Harris; 20 July 1962 (age 64)
- Genres: Post-rock, art rock, synthpop
- Instrument: Drums
- Years active: 1981–present
- Formerly of: Talk Talk; .O.rang; Bark Psychosis

Lee David Harris (born 20 July 1962) is an English drummer and musician. Harris attended The Deanes School with Paul Webb, and they became good friends. They played in the reggae band Eskalator before being recruited to form Talk Talk in 1981. Harris played drums for Talk Talk until 1991. In the early 1990s, he and Webb formed .O.rang. He played drums on the Beth Gibbons and Webb album Out of Season (2002), Midnight Choir's Waiting for the Bricks to Fall (2003) and Bark Psychosis' Codename: Dustsucker (2004). He was also part of Ian Tregoning's Magnetik North project. He co-produced Beth Gibbons' 2024 solo-album Lives Outgrown and co-wrote four of the songs.

== Discography ==
=== With Talk Talk ===
- The Party's Over (1982)
- It's My Life (1984)
- The Colour of Spring (1986)
- Spirit of Eden (1988)
- Laughing Stock (1991)

=== With .O.rang ===
- Herd of Instinct (1994)
- Fields and Waves (1996)

=== With Bark Psychosis ===
- Hex (Bark Psychosis album) (1994) (As assistant engineer)
- Codename: Dustsucker (2004)
