= Talk Talk =

English music group (1981–1991)

- Talk Talk in 1988 from left to right: Mark Hollis, Paul Webb, Lee Harris. Photo by Stephen Lovell-Davis.

Background information
- Origin: London, England
- Genres: Art rock; post-rock; new wave (early); synth-pop (early)
- Years active: 1981–1991
- Labels: EMI; Parlophone; Polydor
- Spinoffs: .O.rang
- Past members: Mark Hollis; Lee Harris; Paul Webb; Simon Brenner

Talk Talk were an English band formed in 1981 by Mark Hollis (vocals, guitar, piano), Lee Harris (drums), Paul Webb (bass), and Simon Brenner (keyboards). Initially a synth-pop group, Talk Talk's first two albums, The Party's Over (1982) and It's My Life (1984), reached top 40 in the UK and produced the international hit singles "Talk Talk", "Today", "It's My Life", and "Such a Shame".

Talk Talk achieved widespread critical success in the UK and elsewhere in Europe as a new wave band with the album The Colour of Spring (1986) and its singles "Life's What You Make It" and "Living in Another World". 1988's Spirit of Eden moved the group towards a more experimental sound informed by jazz and improvisation, pioneering what became known as post-rock; it was critically acclaimed but commercially unsuccessful.

Friction with the band's label, EMI, resulted in legal action and countersuing. Webb departed, and the band switched to Polydor for their final studio album, 1991's Laughing Stock, which elaborated further on the style of Spirit of Eden. However, the band split soon afterwards. Hollis released an eponymous solo album in 1998 before retiring from the music industry; he died in 2019. Webb and Harris played in several bands together, including .O.rang; long-term collaborator Tim Friese-Greene continued in the music business as a musician and producer.

== History ==
=== 1981–1983: Formation ===
Talk Talk began as a quartet consisting of Mark Hollis, formerly from the Reaction (vocals/main songwriter), Lee Harris (drums), Paul Webb (bass guitar), and Simon Brenner (keyboards). In their early years they were often compared with Duran Duran. In addition to a band name consisting of a repeated word, the two shared a Roxy Music-inspired musical direction, as well as the same record label (EMI) and producer (Colin Thurston). The band also supported Duran Duran on tour in 1982.

The band released their first single, "Mirror Man", on EMI in February 1982. The single was not a great success, but was quickly followed by their self-titled single in April 1982 (a rerecording of a track by the Reaction), which reached No. 52 in the UK. The band's first album, The Party's Over, was released in July 1982. They had their first UK Top 40 hits with the singles "Today" (UK No. 14) and a re-release of "Talk Talk" (UK No. 23).

These singles were also hits in other countries, including Ireland, South Africa, Australia and New Zealand. The re-release of the "Talk Talk" single reached the US Top 75. The album was produced by Colin Thurston, who was Duran Duran's in-house EMI producer at the time, but picked by Hollis because of his involvement with David Bowie's "Heroes". It was a moderate success in the UK reaching No. 21, and was later certified Silver by the BPI for sales of 60,000 copies by 1985. It was a Top 10 hit in New Zealand.

Brenner left after the 1983 non-LP hit single "My Foolish Friend", which was produced by frequent Roxy Music collaborator Rhett Davies. At this point, Talk Talk were a trio, as Brenner was never officially replaced. Tim Friese-Greene was recruited to assist with the recording of their second album, It's My Life, and he became the band's producer, keyboardist, and Hollis' songwriting partner. Although a major contributor to the band's studio output and a de facto fourth member, Friese-Greene never officially joined the band. As such, he did not play with the touring band on live dates, and was absent from the band's publicity material.

=== 1984–1986: Commercial success ===
Although major success eluded them in the UK, Talk Talk achieved considerable international success in 1984/85, particularly in continental Europe, North America and New Zealand, with the album It's My Life. The accompanying single "Such a Shame" (inspired by the book The Dice Man) became a Top 10 hit in Austria, Italy, France, Germany, Netherlands and Switzerland during this period. The title track of the album entered the US, Canadian, French, German, New Zealand and Netherlands Top 40.

A third single, "Dum Dum Girl", was a success in some European countries and in New Zealand, but the album and its singles were largely ignored in the UK. Commercial success notwithstanding, the band made deliberate choices that moved them away from the mainstream. The music video for "It's My Life" featured a grumpy Hollis who mocks lip-synching. After EMI protested, they re-shot the video, turning it into "a total piss-take of lip-synching", in Alan McGee's words.

The artist James Marsh designed the first cover image for It's My Life based on the band's name. He followed the theme for subsequent singles, remaining the band's artistic frontman and creating all their covers and posters throughout their career.

Talk Talk abandoned the synth-pop style completely with their third album, 1986's The Colour of Spring. It became their biggest success in the UK, making the Top 10 (and certified Gold by the BPI for sales over 100,000 copies), in part due to the Top 20 single "Life's What You Make It", which was also successful internationally. Another single, "Living in Another World", charted in the Top 40 in Germany, the Netherlands, Switzerland, Belgium and Italy, and just outside the Top 40 in the UK and France. By this time, all Talk Talk songs were being written by Hollis and Friese-Greene.

The extended line-up for the 1986 tour consisted of Hollis, Webb and Harris, plus John Turnbull (guitars), Rupert Black and Ian Curnow (keyboards), Phil Reis and Leroy Williams (percussion), and Mark Feltham (harmonica). Most notable among these concerts was their appearance at the Montreux Jazz Festival, 11 July 1986, released on DVD in 2008 as Live at Montreux 1986. Their final ever live show was in Salamanca, Spain, on 13 September 1986.

=== 1987–1991: Experimental period ===
The success of The Colour of Spring afforded the band a bigger budget and schedule for the recording of their next album. Over a year in the making, and featuring contributions from many outside musicians, Spirit of Eden was released in 1988, on EMI's Parlophone label. The album was assembled from many hours of improvised instrumentation that Hollis and Friese-Greene had edited and arranged using digital equipment. The result was a mix of rock, jazz, classical, and ambient music. Critically praised, the album reached the UK Top 20 and was certified Silver by the BPI for sales of over 60,000 copies. The band announced they would not be attempting to recreate the album live because, according to Hollis, "people would just want to hear the songs as they are on the album and for me that's not satisfying enough".

Without touring or music videos or singles as the band intended, there was little marketing left that the record company could do; in the end the band grudgingly agreed to a video for the remixed version of "I Believe in You", released as first single. Hollis was unhappy with the video, as he made clear in an interview with Q: "I really feel that [the video] was a massive mistake ... I thought just by sitting there and listening and really thinking about what it was about, I could get that in my eyes. But you cannot do it. It just feels stupid. It was depressing and I wish I'd never done it."

During the making of Spirit of Eden, Talk Talk manager Keith Aspden had attempted to free the band from their record contract with EMI. Relations between the band and label continued to degrade after the album's release, eventually culminating in litigation brought by Aspden which extracted the band from their EMI contract. In 2011, Aspden clarified the conditions surrounding the dispute: "in essence our motivation in the court case with EMI was all about money and an opportunity to secure a better deal with another record company. EMI in our view had misinterpreted the meaning of the clause which specified when they should exercise their option. They lost the case on appeal." EMI then sued the band, claiming that Spirit of Eden was not "commercially satisfactory", but the case was thrown out of court. Webb left the band in late 1988.

With the band now released from EMI, the label released the retrospective compilation Natural History in 1990. It peaked at number three on the UK Albums Chart and was certified Gold by the BPI for sales of over 100,000 copies. It was an international success and sold more than one million copies worldwide. The 1984 single "It's My Life" was also re-released, and this time became the band's highest-charting single in their native country, reaching number 13 on the UK singles chart. A re-release of the single "Life's What You Make It" reached the Top 30. Following up on this renewed popular interest in the band, the label then released History Revisited in 1991, a compilation of new remixes, which made the UK Top 40. It reached the Top 30 in Germany and the Top 75 in the Netherlands. The band sued EMI for releasing the remixed material without their permission.

By 1990, the band had essentially morphed into a vehicle for the studio recordings of Hollis and long-term collaborator Friese-Greene, along with session musicians, including long-term Talk Talk drummer Harris. The group signed a two-album contract with Polydor Records and released Laughing Stock on Polydor's Verve Records imprint in 1991. Laughing Stock crystallised the experimental sound the band started with Spirit of Eden, which has been retroactively categorised as "post-rock" by some critics. Even more minimalist than its predecessor, Laughing Stock reached just No. 26 on the UK Albums Chart.

== Post break-up ==
After Laughing Stock, Talk Talk disbanded in 1991; Hollis said that he wished to focus on his family. Webb rejoined Harris, and the two went on to form the band .O.rang, while Friese-Greene started recording under the name Heligoland. In 1998, Hollis released his self-titled solo début Mark Hollis, which was much in keeping with the minimalist post-rock sound of Spirit of Eden and Laughing Stock, but he retired from the music industry shortly afterwards.

Webb collaborated under the name of Rustin Man with Portishead lead singer Beth Gibbons and released Out of Season in 2002, Drift Code in 2019 and Clockdust in 2020. Harris featured on the Bark Psychosis 2004 album, ///Codename: Dustsucker.

Hollis died from cancer on 25 February 2019, aged 64.

== Musical style and legacy ==
Talk Talk's early work was new wave and synth-pop. They are subsequently described as art rock and post-rock. Their influence upon musicians exceeded the band's visibility among the general public. Along with the American band Slint, they are credited with inventing post-rock in their last two albums, Spirit of Eden and Laughing Stock.

Artists who have praised the band or cited them as an influence include Ólafur Arnalds, Jeff Ament of Pearl Jam, Tears for Fears, Matthew Good, Radiohead, Doves, Shearwater, M83, Bark Psychosis, the Notwist, Cedric Bixler-Zavala of the Mars Volta, Steven Wilson of Porcupine Tree, Storm Corrosion (a collaboration between Wilson and Opeth's Mikael Åkerfeldt), Steve Hogarth of Marillion, Richard Barbieri of Japan and Porcupine Tree, and Death Cab for Cutie. Guy Garvey of Elbow said: "Mark Hollis started from punk and by his own admission he had no musical ability. To go from only having the urge, to writing some of the most timeless, intricate and original music ever is as impressive as the moon landings for me." Talk Talk and Hollis are the main influence on the instrumental post-rock project Held By Trees, and it has come to involve many associates of the band.

Bands such as Placebo, Weezer, the Divine Comedy, and the Gathering covered Talk Talk's song "Life's What You Make It", and No Doubt scored a global hit with a cover of "It's My Life" in 2003, which reached number 20 on the UK singles chart. Lights recorded a cover of "Living in Another World".

A tribute album and anthological book, both titled Spirit of Talk Talk, were released in 2012. The book includes all of James Marsh's artwork for the band, and hand-written lyrics by the band. The album, supervised by Alan Wilder (of Depeche Mode), includes covers by various artists, with proceeds going to the conservation organisation BirdLife International.

On 26 November 2019, the surviving band members staged a concert, A Celebration of Mark Hollis and Talk Talk, at the Royal Festival Hall, London. Founding band member Simon Brenner, who played keyboards on the studio album The Party's Over, was amongst the long list of guest musicians who performed songs from all five Talk Talk studio albums and Hollis' solo album. The evening was described as "a majestic tribute" by the Evening Standard.

In March 2020, a documentary about Talk Talk was screened for the first time at the Copenhagen International Documentary Film Festival. Entitled In a Silent Way, filmed before Hollis' death and without the participation of the main band members, it pays tribute to the musical journey and integrity of Talk Talk. In September 2021, the film won the prize for best music documentary awarded by the jury of the Musical Écran festival in France.

Hollis and Talk Talk continue to be praised as artists who did not cave in to the pressures of corporate and commercial interests. Creation Records co-founder Alan McGee said: "I find the whole story of one man against the system in a bid to maintain creative control incredibly heartening."

== Discography ==
- The Party's Over (1982)
- It's My Life (1984)
- The Colour of Spring (1986)
- Spirit of Eden (1988)
- Laughing Stock (1991)
