= List of Gwen Stefani tribute albums =

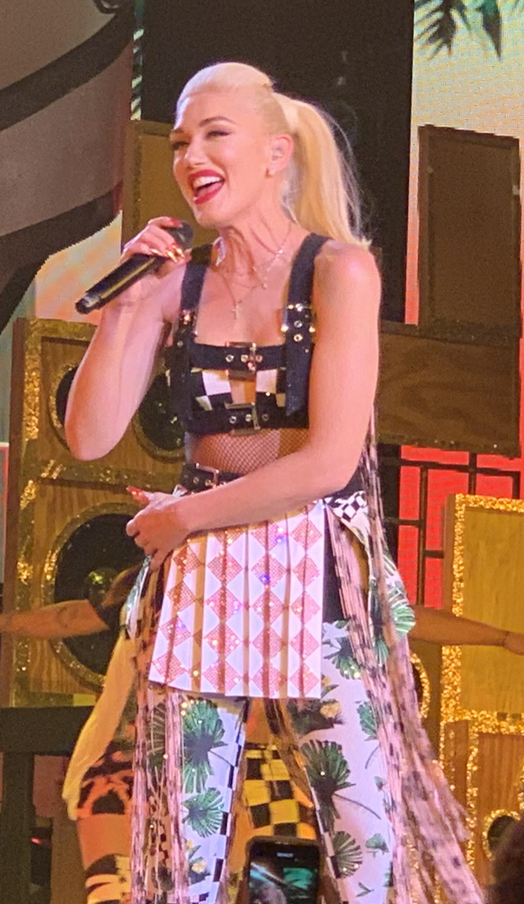
A number of tribute albums have been released in honor of Gwen Stefani.

This is a list of tribute albums dedicated to American singer Gwen Stefani. Amongst projects in honor of Stefani include various cover albums, instrumental albums, and karaoke albums. Following the release of Stefani's first solo studio album in 2004, Love. Angel. Music. Baby., the Vitamin String Quartet released The String Quartet Tribute to Gwen Stefani (2005) to pay tribute. Including covers of songs as performed with string instruments, the album was criticized for being uninteresting. Big Eye Music released two records – both titled A Tribute to Gwen Stefani – in 2006 and 2007. The first album contains 11 covers of Stefani's solo material and her work with No Doubt as performed by the Hollaback Girls tribute band. In addition, an unrelated cover of Coldplay's "Yellow", performed by Tina Root's side-project Tre Lux, serves as a bonus track. The 2007 version features Sabrina Claudio performing a cover of No Doubt's 2000 single "Simple Kind of Life".

Several karaoke albums dedicated to Stefani's discography have been released. Chartbuster Karaoke released All Songs in the Style of No Doubt and Gwen Stefani in 2005, a single CD with 15 songs from No Doubt and Stefani's catalogs. The same label also distributed a two-part Gwen Stefani collection, with the first volume released in 2007 and the second in 2009. Volume one contains five songs from Love. Angel. Music. Baby. and her 2000 duet with Moby titled "South Side", while the second volume has five songs from The Sweet Escape and "South Side". Roma Music Group distributed children's-friendly collections of Stefani and No Doubt's music with Lullaby Versions of Gwen Stefani & No Doubt and the EP Music Box Versions of Gwen Stefani & No Doubt in 2011 and 2014, respectively.

In 2011, Renegade Karaoke released Instrumental Tribute to Madonna, Gwen Stefani & Shakira, featuring karaoke Madonna covers like "Material Girl" and "Like a Prayer" and karaoke versions of Shakira's "Whenever, Wherever" and "Underneath Your Clothes". The album contains three No Doubt covers: "Hella Good", "Hey Baby", and "Underneath It All". The 2016 compilation album Instrumental Covers of Gwen Stefani contains a total of 15 songs: the first six tracks are covers of Stefani's solo material whereas the latter nine songs are instrumental covers of Garbage singles.

== Tribute albums ==
Title	Album details	List of songs	Notes
Chartbuster Karaoke: All Songs in the Style of No Doubt and Gwen Stefani	Released: August 23, 2005; Label: Chartbusker Karaoke; Format: CD	Track listing and performers: 1. "Bathwater"; 2. "Don't Speak"; 3. "Ex-Girlfriend"; 4. "Hella Good"; 5. "Hey Baby"; 6. "Just a Girl"; 7. "Running"; 8. "Simple Kind of Life"; 9. "Sunday Morning"; 10. "Underneath It All"; 11. "South Side"; 12. "It's My Life"; 13. "Hollaback Girl"; 14. "What You Waiting For?"; 15. "Rich Girl"; All tracks performed by Chartbuster Karaoke.	
The String Quartet Tribute to Gwen Stefani	Released: November 15, 2005; Label: Vitamin Records; Format: CD · digital download	Track listing and performers: 1. "Simple Kind of Life"; 2. "Cool"; 3. "Luxurious"; 4. "Underneath It All"; 5. "The Real Thing"; 6. "Suspension Without Suspense"; 7. "What You Waiting For?"; 8. "Too Late"; 9. "Don't Speak"; 10. "New"; 11. "Magic's in the Makeup"; 12. "Running"; All tracks performed by the Vitamin String Quartet.	
A Tribute to Gwen Stefani (Note: On A Tribute to Gwen Stefani, track 12 is a bonus track tribute cover of Coldplay's "Yellow".)	Released: March 14, 2006; Label: Big Eye Music; Format: CD · digital download	Track listing and performers: 1. "What You Waiting For?"; 2. "Rich Girl"; 3. "Hollaback Girl"; 4. "Luxurious"; 5. "Cool"; 6. "Don't Speak"; 7. "Just a Girl"; 8. "Hey Baby"; 9. "Simple Kind of Life"; 10. "Rock Steady"; 11. "Hey Baby"; 12. "Yellow"; Deluxe edition: 13. "Wind It Up"; 14. "Wind It Up" (Instrumental); 15. "Orange County Girl"; 16. "Orange County Girl" (Instrumental); Tracks 1–10 and 13–16 performed by the Hollaback Girls. Track 11 performed by New Skin. Track 12 performed by Tre Lux featuring Tina Root.	
Gwen Stefani: A Piano Tribute (Note: Gwen Stefani: A Piano Tribute is alternatively called Piano Tribute to Gwen Stefani on some platforms.)	Released: February 20, 2007; Label: CC Entertainment; Format: Digital download	Track listing and performers: 1. "Hella Good"; 2. "Rich Girl"; 3. "Luxurious"; 4. "Just a Girl"; 5. "Don't Speak"; 6. "What You Waiting For?"; 7. "Wind It Up"; 8. "South Side"; 9. "Hollaback Girl"; 10. "Cool"; All tracks performed by the Piano Tribute Players.	
Chartbuster Karaoke: All Songs in the Style of Gwen Stefani	Released: 2007; Label: Chartbusker Karaoke; Format: CD	Track listing and performers: 1. "Hollaback Girl" (with lead vocals); 2. "Rich Girl" (with lead vocals); 3. "Cool" (with lead vocals); 4. "Crash" (with lead vocals); 5. "Luxurious" (with lead vocals); 6. "South Side" (with lead vocals); 7. "Hollaback Girl" (without lead vocals); 8. "Rich Girl" (without lead vocals); 9. "Cool" (without lead vocals); 10. "Crash" (without lead vocals); 11. "Luxurious" (without lead vocals); 12. "South Side" (without lead vocals); All tracks performed by Chartbuster Karaoke.	
Legends Series: No Doubt & Gwen Stefani	Released: 2007; Label: Legends Karaoke; Format: CD	Track listing and performers: 1. "Don't Speak"; 2. "Just a Girl"; 3. "Spiderwebs"; 4. "Excuse Me Mr."; 5. "Simple Kind of Life"; 6. "Hey Baby"; 7. "Hella Good"; 8. "It's My Life"; 9. "Underneath It All"; 10. "What You Waiting For?"; 11. "The Real Thing"; 12. "Luxurious"; 13. "Cool"; 14. "Serious"; 15. "Rich Girl"; 16. "Hollaback Girl"; All tracks performed by Legends Karaoke.	
A Tribute to Gwen Stefani	Released: 2007; Label: Big Eye Music; Format: Digital download	Track listing and performers: 1. "Wind It Up"; 2. "Wind It Up" (Instrumental); 3. "Orange County Girl"; 4. "Orange County Girl" (Instrumental); 5. "Don't Get It Twisted"; 6. "Just a Girl"; 7. "Hey Baby"; 8. "Simple Kind of Life"; 9. "Hella Good"; 10. "Underneath It All"; 11. "Platinum Blonde Life"; Tracks 1, 3–5, 7, and 9–10 performed by ATFC. Tracks 2, 6, and 11 performed by Baby do Brasil. Track 8 performed by Sabrina Claudio.	
Chartbuster Karaoke: All Songs in the Style of Gwen Stefani, Volume 2	Released: July 14, 2009; Label: Chartbusker Karaoke; Format: CD	Track listing and performers: 1. "Now That You Got It" (with lead vocals); 2. "The Sweet Escape" (with lead vocals); 3. "4 in the Morning" (with lead vocals); 4. "Wind It Up" (with lead vocals); 5. "Early Winter" (with lead vocals); 6. "South Side" (with lead vocals); 7. "Now That You Got It" (without lead vocals); 8. "The Sweet Escape" (without lead vocals); 9. "4 in the Morning" (without lead vocals); 10. "Wind It Up" (without lead vocals); 11. "Early Winter" (without lead vocals); 12. "South Side" (without lead vocals); All tracks performed by Chartbuster Karaoke.	
Performed by Academy Allstars: A Tribute to Gwen Stefani	Released: August 17, 2009; Label: One Media Publishing; Format: CD · digital download	Track listing and performers: 1. "Rich Girl"; 2. "The Sweet Escape"; 3. "Cool"; 4. "4 in the Morning"; 5. "Now That You Got It"; 6. "Wind It Up"; 7. "Early Winter"; 8. "Orange County Girl"; All tracks performed by Academy Allstars.	
Instrumental Tribute to Madonna, Gwen Stefani & Shakira (Note: On Instrumental Tribute to Madonna, Gwen Stefani & Shakira, tracks 1–8 are instrumental covers of songs by Madonna, tracks 9–11 are instrumental covers of songs by Stefani and No Doubt, and tracks 12–13 are instrumental covers of songs by Shakira.)	Released: January 26, 2011; Label: Renegade Karaoke; Format: CD · digital download	Track listing and performers: 1. "Like a Prayer"; 2. "Lucky Star"; 3. "Die Another Day"; 4. "Holiday"; 5. "Like a Virgin"; 6. "Into the Groove"; 7. "Material Girl"; 8. "Dress You Up"; 9. "Hey Baby"; 10. "Underneath It All"; 11. "Hella Good"; 12. "Whenever, Wherever"; 13. "Underneath Your Clothes"; All tracks performed by the Renegade Karaoke Players.	
Lullaby Versions of Gwen Stefani & No Doubt	Released: April 11, 2011; Label: Roma Music Group; Format: CD · digital download	Track listing and performers: 1. "Don't Speak"; 2. "Underneath It All"; 3. "Spiderwebs"; 4. "The Sweet Escape"; 5. "Just a Girl"; 6. "Hey Baby"; 7. "Rich Girl"; 8. "Hella Good"; 9. "It's My Life"; 10. "Hollaback Girl"; 11. "South Side"; All tracks performed by Twinkle Twinkle Little Rock Star.	
Rich Girl – A Tribute to Gwen Stefani	Released: March 29, 2012; Label: Ameritz Music Limited; Format: Digital download	Track listing and performers: 1. "4 in the Morning"; 2. "Cool"; 3. "Orange County Girl"; 4. "The Sweet Escape"; 5. "Crash"; 6. "Early Winter"; 7. "Hollaback Girl"; 8. "Luxurious"; 9. "Now That You Got It"; 10. "What You Waiting For?"; 11. "Wind It Up"; 12. "Rich Girl"; All tracks performed by Ameritz Tribute Tracks.	
A Tribute to No Doubt and Gwen Stefani	Released: June 12, 2012; Label: Drew's Entertainment; Format: Digital download	Track listing and performers: 1. "Don't Speak"; 2. "Hella Good"; 3. "Hey Baby"; 4. "It's My Life"; 5. "Just a Girl"; 6. "Underneath It All"; 7. "Hollaback Girl"; 8. "Luxurious"; 9. "Wind It Up"; 10. "Rich Girl"; 11. "The Sweet Escape"; All tracks performed by the Hit Crew.	
Music Box Versions of Gwen Stefani & No Doubt EP	Released: October 28, 2014; Label: Roma Music Group; Format: Digital download	Track listing and performers: 1. "Don't Speak"; 2. "Underneath It All"; 3. "Spiderwebs"; 4. "Rich Girl"; 5. "Hella Good"; 6. "Hollaback Girl"; All tracks performed by Music Box Mania.	
Instrumental Covers of Gwen Stefani (Note: On Instrumental Covers of Gwen Stefani, tracks 7–15 are instrumental covers of songs by Garbage, despite the title solely referencing Stefani.)	Released: June 20, 2016; Label: White Knight Instrumental; Format: Digital download	Track listing and performers: 1. "What You Waiting For?"; 2. "4 in the Morning"; 3. "Cool"; 4. "Hollaback Girl"; 5. "Rich Girl"; 6. "The Sweet Escape"; 7. "#1 Crush"; 8. "Cherry Lips"; 9. "I Think I'm Paranoid"; 10. "Milk"; 11. "Queer"; 12. "Special"; 13. "Stupid Girl"; 14. "Supervixen"; 15. "Vow"; All tracks performed by White Knight Instrumental.	
