= The Sweet Escape =

2006 studio album by Gwen Stefani

Studio album by Gwen Stefani
- Released: December 1, 2006
- Recorded: 2005–2006
- Studios: South Beach (Miami Beach, Florida) (Note: Tracks 1, 3, 7 and 9); Record Plant (Hollywood) (Note: Tracks 1 and 7); Capitol (Hollywood) (Note: Track 1); Right Track (New York) (Note: Tracks 2 and 11); Doppler (Atlanta) (Note: Track 2); Henson (Hollywood) (Note: Tracks 2, 5 and 12); Home Recordings, London (Note: Tracks 4 and 12); Sony (New York) (Note: Track 5); Kingsbury (Los Angeles) (Note: Tracks 6, 8 and 10); Electric Lady (New York) (Note: Tracks 6 and 10); The Nook (Los Angeles) (Note: Tracks 6, 8, 10 and 11); Interscope (Santa Monica, California) (Note: Track 8); Chalice (Hollywood) (Note: Track 9); Grandmaster (Hollywood) (Note: Track 10)
- Genres: Dance-pop; electropop; rap
- Length: 46:56
- Label: Interscope
- Producers: Nellee Hooper; Tony Kanal; the Neptunes; Kaseem "Swizz Beatz" Dean; Aliaune "Akon" Thiam

Gwen Stefani chronology
Love. Angel. Music. Baby. (2004)	The Sweet Escape (2006)	This Is What the Truth Feels Like (2016)

Singles from The Sweet Escape
- 1. "Wind It Up" Released: October 30, 2006; 2. "The Sweet Escape" Released: December 19, 2006; 3. "4 in the Morning" Released: May 8, 2007; 4. "Now That You Got It" Released: August 26, 2007; 5. "Early Winter" Released: January 18, 2008

The Sweet Escape is the second solo album by the American singer-songwriter Gwen Stefani, released on December 1, 2006, by Interscope Records. Having originally intended to return to No Doubt after her debut solo album, Love. Angel. Music. Baby. (2004), Stefani decided to record a second album as a way to release some of the material left over from the Love. Angel. Music. Baby. writing sessions. The album musically resembles its predecessor while exploring more modern pop sounds. It was released to generally mixed reviews from contemporary music critics, receiving criticism for its strong similarities to Love. Angel. Music. Baby.

It was preceded by the lead single "Wind It Up", which charted moderately across the world, and produced the follow-up single "The Sweet Escape", which proved to be more successful worldwide. The Sweet Escape reached the top five in the United States, Canada, and Australia and peaked inside the top 20 in the United Kingdom. The album's supporting tour, The Sweet Escape Tour, kicked off in April 2007, covering North America, Colombia, Australia, Asia, and Europe.

== Conception ==
=== Background ===
Following the release of her debut album Love. Angel. Music. Baby., Stefani announced that she had intended to return to No Doubt and record a sixth studio album with the band. After the commercial success of L.A.M.B., she decided to release several leftover tracks from the album as an EP or as extra tracks on a DVD. However, Pharrell Williams, with whom she had collaborated to write "Hollaback Girl", convinced Stefani to create "a L.A.M.B. part two", and the two recorded several songs during sessions in Miami in July 2005.

The two produced "Wind It Up", "Orange County Girl", "U Started It", "Yummy", "Breakin' Up", and "Candyland" during these sessions, and the songs were used for a fashion show premiering the 2006 collection of Stefani's fashion line L.A.M.B. She included performances of "Wind It Up" and "Orange County Girl" when she embarked on the Harajuku Lovers Tour in October 2005. Stefani put the project on hold in December 2005 when she discovered that she was pregnant, before returning to the studio in August 2006. The album's working title was Candyland, sharing its name with an unreleased track that has only been looped via her fashion show soundtrack. The title was changed to The Sweet Escape, the title of the second track.

=== Album cover ===
The album cover was taken by photographer Jill Greenberg. The image was part of a series of promotional images taken by Greenberg, inspired by her previous End Times exhibition. To create End Times, Greenberg gave lollipops to toddlers but took them back after several moments, provoking emotional outbursts. Greenberg used the images as a representation of American politics and society. Greenberg was accused of child abuse for the photo shoots; Stefani, however, commented, "I didn't think 'child abuse'—I just thought, 'That's beautiful.' Every kid cries [...] Other people reacted like, 'Oh my God. That's so disturbing,' or 'That's so sad.' I guess that's what art's all about. It's supposed to make you think."

Stefani's appearance on the album cover is inspired by that of Elvira Hancock, a cocaine addict portrayed by Michelle Pfeiffer in the 1983 film Scarface. Stefani first gained inspiration for the style while shooting the music video for "Cool" in Lake Como, Italy. During the shoot, Stefani saw her No Doubt bandmate Tony Kanal and his girlfriend, who had on a "long, peach, polyester [late-1970s style] dress". It was this dress that got Stefani thinking "about Michelle Pfeiffer and how amazingly styled she was [in Scarface]", which in turn drew inspiration for the cover. The pair of oversized sunglasses on the album cover is intended to represent her "guarded exterior", and the other images symbolize her various emotions.

== Composition ==
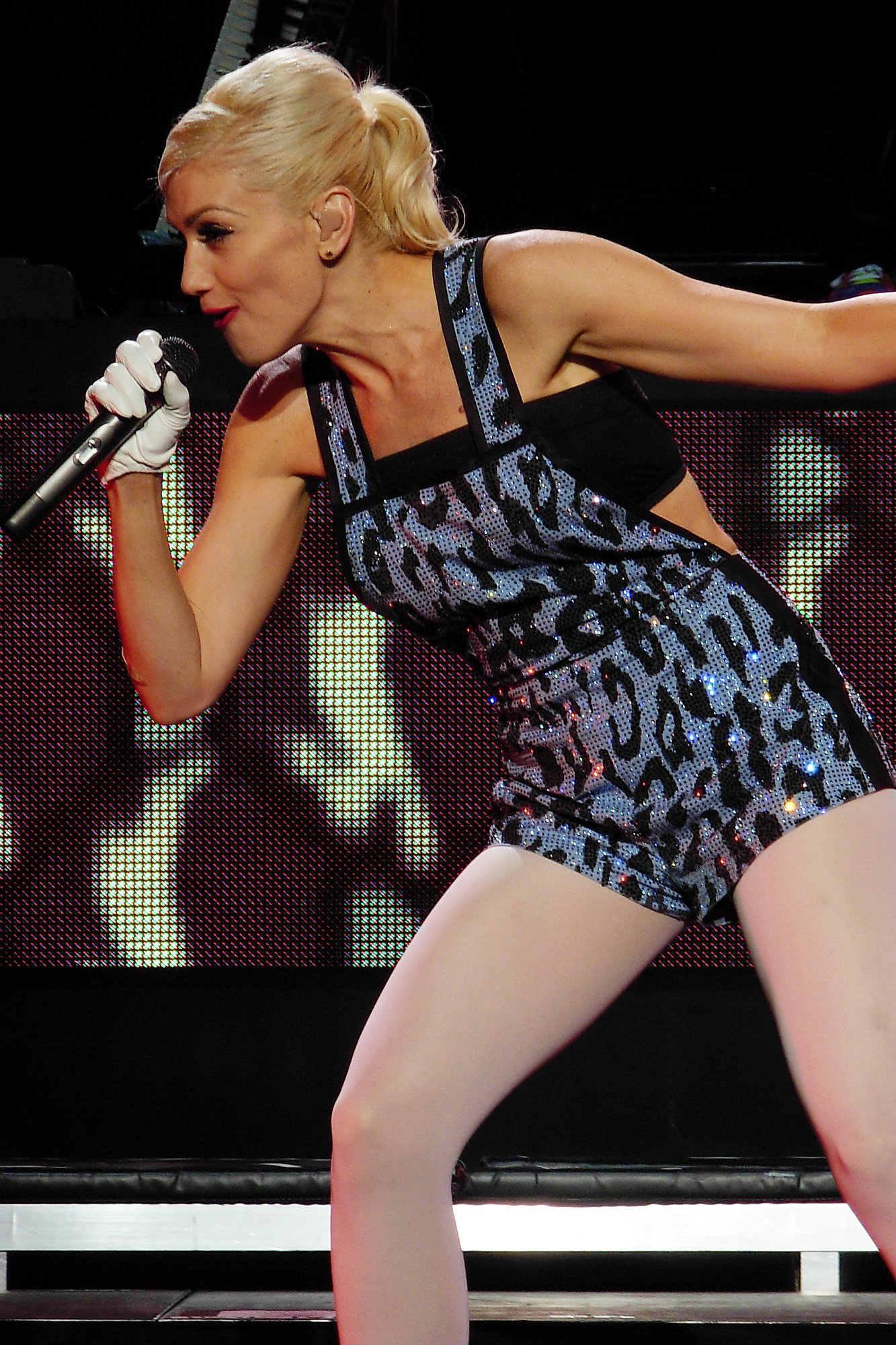
Stefani performing "Wind It Up" during the Sweet Escape Tour

The Sweet Escape is a primarily dance-pop, electropop, and rap album, featuring themes of romantic situations and details of her career and personal life, while sonically the album features "sparsely rhythmic tracks where she chants as much as she sings" and "pop songs that aim for choruses." The album opens with "Wind It Up", which features fanfares and samples from The Sound of Music's "The Lonely Goatherd", having "material-minded lyrics touting her fashion line and her shape." The second and title track, "The Sweet Escape", is a dance and doo-wop song, which features Akon providing a "wee-oh!" hook, with lyrics about a "feisty sort of apology." "Orange County Girl" is an autobiographical rap song, where Stefani shows how she is "grateful for her success while recalling the simpler days of her youth." The album's first ballad, "Early Winter", has influences of 1980s soft rock and lyrics about the need for fidelity and transparency in romantic relationship. "Now That You Got It" features military snare drums, loping hip-hop beat and a staccato piano sample. Its lyrics has Stefani "act[ing] as if she's doing a lover a favor and challenges him to come through."

The sixth track "4 in the Morning" is a 1980s-inspired synth-pop ballad that lyrically deals with a relationship on the edge, while "Yummy" is a dance song, with a tribal rhythm, cameo by Pharrell Williams and lyrics that finds Stefani declaring that "making babies leaves her eager to feel sexy again." "Fluorescent" features Angelo Moore on saxophone, and was compared to the works of Madonna and Prince, while "Breakin' Up" has influences of hip hop and electronica and it is "a breakup song built on a dying cell phone metaphor." The tenth track, "Don't Get It Twisted", talks about an unexpected pregnancy, in a song influenced by reggaeton. "U Started It" was noted for having "lilting melody, silken harmonies, and pizzicato strings", while the final track, "Wonderful Life", was named a Depeche Mode-style synth ballad about how much she misses her first love and how the person had a profound impact on her.

== Critical reception ==
Professional ratings
Aggregate scores
Source	Rating
Metacritic	58/100
Review scores
Source	Rating
AllMusic	3/5 stars
Entertainment Weekly	B−
The Guardian	4/5 stars
NME	4/10
The Observer	3/5 stars
Pitchfork	6.5/10
PopMatters	4/10
Q	3/5 stars
Rolling Stone	2/5 stars
Slant Magazine	3/5 stars

The Sweet Escape received mixed reviews from music critics. At Metacritic, which assigns a normalized rating out of 100 to reviews from mainstream publications, the album received an average score of 58, based on 24 reviews. Stephen Thomas Erlewine of AllMusic wrote, "From the stilted production to the fashion fetish, all the way down to her decision to rap on far too much of the album, all the dance-pop here seems like a pose." Alex Miller of NME was more emphatic, dubbing it "this year's bargain-bin fodder", and stated that "the majority of this record serves only to bury what made Gwen Stefani unique in the first place." At Entertainment Weekly, Sia Michel noted that the album "has a surprisingly moody, lightly autobiographical feel" but that "Stefani isn't convincing as a dissatisfied diva". Pitchfork's Mark Pytlik described the album's oddities as a career risk for Stefani, where most of the "gonzo pop songs yield some degree of payout" but that Stefani's tight scheduling during production of the album leaves the result "somewhere between the vanguard and the insipid." Paul Flynn of The Observer characterized the album as less interesting than Fergie's The Dutchess and Nelly Furtado's Loose. Robert Christgau cited the song "Yummy" as a "choice cut".

The album received criticism for its similarities to Love. Angel. Music. Baby. Sal Cinquemani of Slant Magazine opined that "[h]istory will likely view The Sweet Escape as a retread of Stefani's well-received solo debut, but it shares that album's general inconsistency and, thus, its peaks and valleys". Rob Sheffield of Rolling Stone agreed, viewing it as "her hasty return" to music lacking the energy of L.A.M.B. and in which "she sounds exhausted." The New York Times' Jon Pareles commented that Stefani "rebooks some of the same producers and repeats some of the old tricks with less flair", adding that "superficiality is more fun when it doesn't get so whiny." Caroline Sullivan disagreed in her review for The Guardian, in which she stated that although some of the songs date back to the 2003 writing sessions for L.A.M.B., "generally The Sweet Escape feels minty-fresh." Quentin B. Huff of PopMatters, however, referred to The Sweet Escape as L.A.M.B.: Reloaded and described The Sweet Escape and L.A.M.B. as "the same album, just add more rap, a glossy Next-Top-Model-ish photo for the cover, and a few more recent-sounding influences."

== Commercial performance ==
The Sweet Escape debuted at number three on the Billboard 200, selling 243,000 copies in its first week. It sold another 149,000 copies during its second week, falling to number 14. The album was certified platinum by the Recording Industry Association of America (RIAA) on June 25, 2007, and had sold 1,733,000 copies in the United States by February 2016. The Canadian Recording Industry Association (CRIA) certified The Sweet Escape platinum eight days prior to the album's release, and double platinum on March 5, 2007.

In the United Kingdom, The Sweet Escape debuted at number 26 on the UK Albums Chart with first-week sales of 33,632 copies. Three months later, on March 4, 2007, the album reached a new peak position of number 14. It was certified Platinum by the British Phonographic Industry (BPI) on July 22, 2013 and, as of March 2016, has sold 365,143 copies in the UK. The album was moderately successful across Europe, peaking in the top 10 in Norway and Switzerland; the top 20 in Austria, Finland, Germany, Hungary, Ireland, and Sweden; and the top 40 in Belgium, Denmark, France and the Netherlands. The Sweet Escape reached number two for two consecutive weeks on the ARIA Albums Chart in Australia, and was certified double platinum by the Australian Recording Industry Association (ARIA).

== The Sweet Escape Tour ==
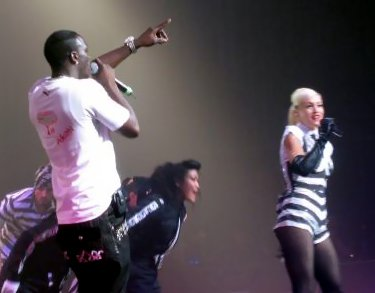
Stefani and Akon performing title track "The Sweet Escape" during The Sweet Escape Tour

The Sweet Escape Tour was Stefani's follow-up to the Harajuku Lovers Tour. It went worldwide as compared to her previous tour which was constricted only to North America and had more than double the number of shows. It was Stefani's last solo effort as she rejoined her band No Doubt after the tour ended. The main feature were usage of various props such as a prison for Stefani's opening act, a six-piece band and a large multimedia screen in the backdrop showing videos and animations.

The tour had its own set of controversies. A group of students making up for The National Union of Malaysian Muslim Students banned Stefani's concert that was slated to take place on August 21, 2007, at Putra Indoor Stadium in Kuala Lumpur. The union's vice president, Abdul Muntaqim, said, "Her performance and her attire are not suitable for our culture. It promotes a certain degree of obscenity and will encourage youth to emulate the western lifestyle. The concert should be stopped." The organizer of the event, Maxis Communications, later responded, "Stefani has confirmed that her concert will not feature any revealing costumes. She will abide by the Malaysian authorities' guidelines to ensure that her show will not be offensive to local sensitivities." In April 2007, Akon, one of the tour's opening acts, drew criticism for engaging in on-stage dirty dancing with a 14-year-old girl at a club in Port of Spain, Trinidad and Tobago, as part of a fake contest. As a result, Verizon Wireless terminated its sponsorship of the tour.

Stefani donated $166,000 from her October 30, 2007, concert in San Diego to the San Diego Foundation, in benefit of the victims of the October 2007 California wildfires. On her June 22 and June 23 concerts in Irvine, California, Stefani was joined onstage by her No Doubt bandmates. They performed the band's songs "Just a Girl", "Spiderwebs", "Sunday Morning", "Hella Good", and their cover of Talk Talk's "It's My Life".

== Track listing ==
The Sweet Escape track listing
No.	Title	Writer(s)	Producer(s)	Length
1.	"Wind It Up"	Gwen Stefani; Pharrell Williams; Richard Rodgers; Oscar Hammerstein	The Neptunes; Mark "Spike" Stent^{[a]}; Ron Fair^{[b]}	3:09
2.	"The Sweet Escape" (featuring Akon)	Stefani; Aliaune "Akon" Thiam; Giorgio Tuinfort	Thiam; Tuinfort^{[c]}	4:06
3.	"Orange County Girl"	Stefani; Williams	The Neptunes	3:23
4.	"Early Winter"	Stefani; Tim Rice-Oxley	Nellee Hooper; Stent^{[a]}	4:44
5.	"Now That You Got It"	Stefani; Sean Garrett; Kaseem Dean	Swizz Beatz; Garrett^{[c]}	2:59
6.	"4 in the Morning"	Stefani; Tony Kanal	Kanal; Greg Collins^{[d]}; Stent^{[a]}	4:51
7.	"Yummy" (featuring Pharrell)	Stefani; Williams	The Neptunes	4:57
8.	"Fluorescent"	Stefani; Kanal	Kanal; Stent^{[a]}	4:18
9.	"Breakin' Up"	Stefani; Williams	The Neptunes	3:46
10.	"Don't Get It Twisted"	Stefani; Kanal	Kanal; Collins^{[d]}; Stent^{[a]}	3:36
11.	"U Started It"	Stefani; Williams	The Neptunes; Stent^{[a]}	3:08
12.	"Wonderful Life"	Stefani; Linda Perry	Hooper; Stent^{[a]}	3:58
Total length:				46:56

International edition bonus track
No.	Title	Writer(s)	Producer(s)	Length
13.	"Wind It Up" (Harajuku Lovers Live version)	Stefani; Williams	Guy Charbonneau	3:24
Total length:				50:20

Australian and UK edition bonus video
No.	Title	Writer(s)	Producer(s)	Length
14.	"Orange County Girl" (Harajuku Lovers Live version)	Stefani; Williams	Charbonneau	5:06
Total length:				55:26

Japanese edition bonus video
No.	Title	Writer(s)	Producer(s)	Length
15.	"Wind It Up" (Harajuku Lovers Live version)	Stefani; Williams	Charbonneau	3:24
Total length:				58:50

US iTunes Store edition bonus tracks
No.	Title	Writer(s)	Producer(s)	Length
13.	"Wind It Up" (Original Neptunes Mix)	Stefani; Williams	The Neptunes; Stent^{[a]}	3:08
14.	"Wind It Up" (live) (video)	Stefani; Williams	Charbonneau	3:24
Total length:				53:28

Target edition bonus DVD
No.	Title	Length
1.	"Sessions@AOL Interview" (The Making of L.A.M.B.)
2.	"Behind-the-Scenes Footage" (The L.A.M.B. Tour)
3.	"Wind It Up" (live performance)
4.	"The Making of 'Wind It Up'"
5.	"The Making of The Sweet Escape"

Notes

- ^{^[a]} signifies an additional producer
- ^{^[b]} signifies an orchestra producer
- ^{^[c]} signifies a co-producer
- ^{^[d]} signifies an additional vocal producer
- "Wind It Up" contains interpolations from the composition "The Lonely Goatherd" from The Sound of Music, written by Richard Rodgers and Oscar Hammerstein.

== Personnel ==
Credits adapted from the liner notes of The Sweet Escape.

=== Musicians ===
- Gwen Stefani – vocals
- Talent Bootcamp Kids – additional vocals (track 1)
- Pete Davis – additional mix programming (tracks 1, 4–6, 8, 10–12); additional keyboards (tracks 1, 4–6, 8, 10–12)
- Akon – vocals, programming, keyboards (track 2)
- Giorgio Tuinfort – programming, keyboards (track 2)
- Tony Love – guitar (track 2)
- Aidan Love – programming (track 4)
- Tim Rice-Oxley – piano, keyboards (track 4)
- Mark Ralph – guitar (track 4)
- Greg Collins – bass guitar (track 4); guitar (track 6)
- Loren Dawson – keyboards (track 5)
- Sean Garrett – backing vocals (track 5)
- Neil Kanal – programming (tracks 6, 8, 10); keyboards (track 10)
- Tony Kanal – programming, keyboards (tracks 6, 8, 10)
- Gabrial McNair – keyboards (tracks 6, 8); trombone, baritone (track 10)
- Matt Beck – guitar (track 6)
- Pharrell – vocals (track 7)
- Kingston James McGregor Rossdale – baby sounds (track 7)
- Angelo Moore – saxophone (track 8)
- Alex Dromgoole – guitar (tracks 8, 10); bass guitar (track 10)
- David Emery – guitar (track 8)
- Stephen Bradley – trumpet, baritone (track 10)
- Scheila Gonzalez – saxophone, flute, clarinet (track 10)
- Anthony LoGerfo – percussion (track 10)
- Ewan Pearson – programming (track 12)
- Martin Gore – guitar (track 12)
- Richard Hawley – guitar (track 12)

=== Technical ===
- The Neptunes – production (tracks 1, 3, 7, 9, 11)
- Brian Garten – recording (tracks 1, 3, 7, 9)
- Ron Fair – orchestra production (track 1)
- Hart Gunther – engineering assistance (tracks 1, 3, 9)
- Mark "Spike" Stent – additional production (tracks 1, 4, 6, 8, 10–12); mixing (tracks 1, 2, 4–6, 8–12)
- Alex Dromgoole – engineering assistance (tracks 1, 2, 4–6, 8–12)
- David Emery – engineering assistance (tracks 1, 2, 4–6, 8–12)
- Akon – production (track 2)
- Giorgio Tuinfort – co-production (track 2)
- Mark "Exit" Goodchild – recording (track 2)
- Bojan Dugic – recording (track 2)
- Keith Gretlein – recording (track 2)
- Kevin Mills – recording (tracks 2, 5); engineering assistance (track 12)
- Yvan Bing – engineering assistance (track 2)
- Rich Travali – mixing (track 3)
- Nellee Hooper – production (tracks 4, 12)
- Greg Collins – recording (tracks 4, 6, 8, 10, 12); additional vocal production (tracks 6, 10); additional vocals recording (track 11)
- Ian Rossiter – engineering assistance (tracks 4, 12)
- Swizz Beatz – production (track 5)
- Sean Garrett – co-production (track 5)
- Angel Aponte – additional recording (track 5)
- Glenn Pittman – engineering assistance (track 5)
- Steve Tolle – engineering assistance (track 5)
- Tony Kanal – production (tracks 6, 8, 10)
- Neil Kanal – recording (tracks 6, 8, 10)
- Colin Mitchell – recording (tracks 6, 8, 10)
- Andrew Alekel – recording (tracks 6, 8, 10)
- Dror Mohar – engineering assistance (tracks 6, 8, 10)
- Andrew Coleman – recording (tracks 7, 11)
- Ryan Kennedy – engineering assistance (track 7)
- Phil Tan – mixing (track 7)
- Julian Chan – recording (track 8)
- Jonathan Merritt – recording (track 8)
- Jason Finkel – engineering assistance (track 11)
- Simon Gogerly – recording (track 12)
- Brian "Big Bass" Gardner – mastering at Bernie Grundman Mastering (Hollywood, California)

=== Artwork ===
- Jill Greenberg – photography, fine art concept
- Jolie Clemens – art direction, layout
- Nicole Frantz – photography, art and packaging coordination
- Cindy Cooper – photography, art and packaging coordination

== Charts ==
=== Weekly charts ===
Weekly chart performance for The Sweet Escape
Chart (2006–2007)	Peak position
Australian Albums (ARIA)	2
Australian Urban Albums (ARIA)	1
Austrian Albums (Ö3 Austria)	18
Belgian Albums (Ultratop Flanders)	40
Belgian Alternative Albums (Ultratop Flanders)	22
Belgian Albums (Ultratop Wallonia)	42
Canadian Albums (Billboard)	3
Croatian Albums (HDU)	32
Czech Albums (ČNS IFPI)	28
Danish Albums (Hitlisten)	23
Dutch Albums (Album Top 100)	35
European Albums (Billboard)	23
Finnish Albums (Suomen virallinen lista)	15
French Albums (SNEP)	33
German Albums (Offizielle Top 100)	17
Greek Albums (IFPI)	33
Hungarian Albums (MAHASZ)	20
Irish Albums (IRMA)	16
Italian Albums (FIMI)	60
Japanese Albums (Oricon)	7
Mexican Albums (Top 100 Mexico)	39
New Zealand Albums (RMNZ)	4
Norwegian Albums (VG-lista)	5
Polish Albums (ZPAV)	29
Scottish Albums (Official Charts)	24
Swedish Albums (Sverigetopplistan)	19
Swiss Albums (Schweizer Hitparade)	8
Taiwanese Albums (Five Music)	1
UK Albums (Official Charts)	14
UK R&B Albums (Official Charts)	3
US Billboard 200	3
US Top Alternative Albums (Billboard)	13

=== Year-end charts ===
2006 year-end chart performance for The Sweet Escape
Chart (2006)	Position
Australian Albums (ARIA)	91
Australian Urban Albums (ARIA)	11
UK Albums (OCC)	179
Worldwide Albums (IFPI)	37

2007 year-end chart performance for The Sweet Escape
Chart (2007)	Position
Australian Albums (ARIA)	21
Australian Urban Albums (ARIA)	4
Austrian Albums (Ö3 Austria)	58
Belgian Albums (Ultratop Wallonia)	90
European Albums (Billboard)	42
French Albums (SNEP)	118
German Albums (Offizielle Top 100)	71
Hungarian Albums (MAHASZ)	87
New Zealand Albums (RMNZ)	23
Swiss Albums (Schweizer Hitparade)	47
UK Albums (OCC)	68
US Billboard 200	15

2008 year-end chart performance for The Sweet Escape
Chart (2008)	Position
Australian Urban Albums (ARIA)	50

== Certifications ==
Certifications for The Sweet Escape
Region	Certification	Certified units/sales
Australia (ARIA)	2× Platinum	140,000^{^}
Canada (Music Canada)	2× Platinum	200,000^{^}
Denmark (IFPI Danmark)	Gold	20,000^{^}
Germany (BVMI)	Gold	100,000^{^}
Hungary (MAHASZ)	Gold	3,000^{^}
Japan (RIAJ)	Gold	100,000^{^}
New Zealand (RMNZ)	2× Platinum	30,000^{‡}
Norway (IFPI Norway)	Gold	20,000^{*}
Poland (ZPAV)	Gold	10,000^{*}
Russia (NFPF)	2× Platinum	40,000^{*}
Switzerland (IFPI Switzerland)	Platinum	30,000^{^}
United Kingdom (BPI)	Platinum	365,143
United States (RIAA)	2× Platinum	2,000,000^{‡}
^{*} Sales figures based on certification alone.^{^} Shipments figures based on certification alone.^{‡} Sales+streaming figures based on certification alone.

== Release history ==
Release history for The Sweet Escape
Region	Date	Label	Ref.
Australia	December 1, 2006	Universal	
Germany	December 1, 2006	Universal	
Netherlands	December 1, 2006	Universal	
France	December 4, 2006	Universal	
United Kingdom	December 4, 2006	Polydor	
United States	December 5, 2006	Interscope	
Sweden	December 6, 2006	Universal	
Italy	December 7, 2006	Universal	
Japan	January 31, 2007	Universal	
