= The Sweet Escape Tour =

2007 concert tour by Gwen Stefani

- World tour by Gwen Stefani
- Promotional poster for the tour
- Location: North America • South America • Oceania • Asia • Europe
- Associated album: The Sweet Escape
- Start date: April 21, 2007
- End date: November 3, 2007
- Legs: 5
- No. of shows: 54 in North America; 4 in South America; 8 in Oceania; 6 in Asia; 26 in Europe; 98 total

Gwen Stefani concert chronology
- Harajuku Lovers Tour (2005); The Sweet Escape Tour (2007); This Is What the Truth Feels Like Tour (2016)

The Sweet Escape Tour was the second concert tour by American recording artist Gwen Stefani. The tour began in April 2007 in support of her second solo album The Sweet Escape (2006). Performing for nearly a hundred concerts, the tour traveled to the Americas, Australia, Asia, and Europe.

The shows in North America ranked 23rd on Billboard "Top 25 Tours". The 55 reported shows grossed $30.6 million with 648,529 tickets sold.

== Background ==
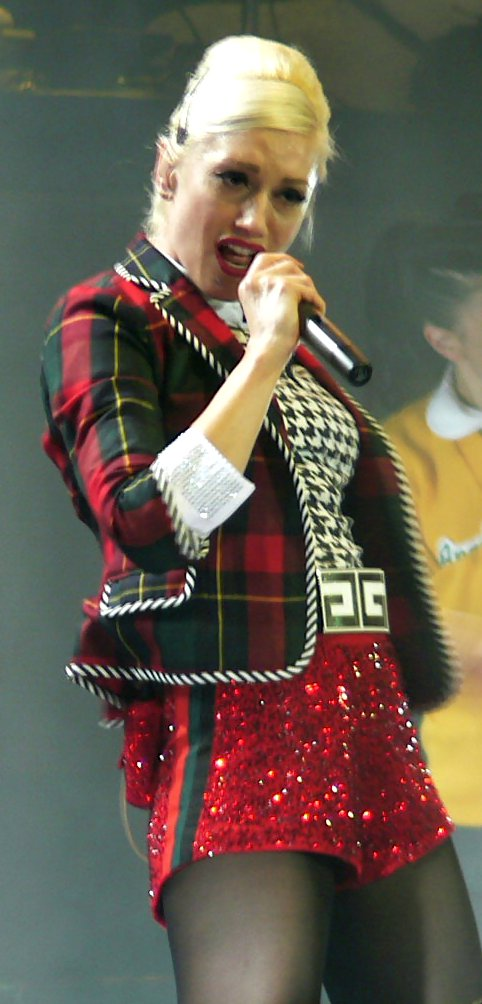
Stefani performing her hit, "Hollaback Girl" in The Woodlands, Texas

The tour was Stefani's follow up to her previous 2005 tour. It went worldwide as compared to her previous tour which was constricted only to North America and had more than double the number of shows. It was Stefani's last solo effort as she rejoined her band No Doubt after the tour ended. The main feature were usage of various props such as a prison for Stefani's opening act, a six-piece band and a large multimedia screen in the backdrop showing videos and animations.

On her June 22 and June 23 concerts in Irvine, California, Stefani was joined onstage by her No Doubt bandmates. They performed: "Just a Girl", "Spiderwebs", "Sunday Morning", "Hella Good" and their cover of Talk Talk's "It's My Life".

In response to the 2007 California wildfires, Stefani donated $166,000 from her October 30 concert in San Diego to "The San Diego Foundation" fire relief fund.

The tour had its own set of controversies. A group known as "The National Union of Malaysian Muslim Students" wanted to ban Stefani's concert that was slated to take place on August 21 at Putra Indoor Stadium. The union's vice president, Abdul Muntaqim said, "Her performance and her attire are not suitable for our culture. It promotes a certain degree of obscenity and will encourage youth to emulate the western lifestyle. The concert should be stopped." The organizer of the vent, Maxis Communications later responded, "Stefani has confirmed that her concert will not feature any revealing costumes. She will abide by the Malaysian authorities' guidelines to ensure that her show will not be offensive to local sensitivities."

In April, Akon drew criticism for having on-stage dirty dancing with a fifteen-year-old preacher's daughter, at a club in Trinidad and Tobago, as part of a fake contest. As a result, the tour's sponsor Verizon Wireless decided not to sponsor the tour.

== Critical reception ==
The Sweet Escape tour was generally well-received by critics. Ricardo Baca (The Denver Post) stated the concert in Denver showed Stefani had the tact to become a solo pop star. He continues, "Wednesday's show was proof of Stefani the rock star. While she's still better suited for the sneering pop-ska of her band No Doubt, she does all right with the glittery, hip-hop-fueled Top 40-loving music on which she has built her solo career." For the concert in Mansfield, Joan Anderman of The Boston Globe stated, "Ironically, for a performer so enamored of artifice, Stefani perpetually comes off as one of the more genuine chart-toppers. Her voice was built for amped-up cheers like "Hollaback Girl," not slow jams like "Luxurious," but her bad notes were hers, part of a real personality rather than a standard-issue pop star."

Ross Raihala (St. Paul Pioneer Press) described her performance in Saint Paul as a "high spirited, energetic sugar rush". He goes on to say, "Yet it was the fresh stuff that made the night work. The high-tech stage and carefully choreographed dance numbers rarely felt canned, and just when they started to get overwhelming, Stefani sprinted to the back of the auditorium and up into the seats to perform a stripped-down 'Cool' [,] surrounded by awestruck fans." Chris Macias of The Sacramento Bee stated her show in Wheatland had a natural sweetness. He says, "Stefani certainly doesn't skimp on her shows. It's part pep rally (the "b-a-n-a-n-a-s" chant in 'Hollaback Girl'), part Broadway musical (the bit from 'The Sound of Music' in 'Wind it Up' that turns Stefani into a yodel-back girl), plus a whole lot of breakdancing from Stefani's sidekicks. [...] With a five-piece band perched high on a riser, and a giant 'G' that descended occasionally from the top of the stage, this concert had plenty of eye and ear candy."

At the Shoreline Amphitheatre, Neva Chonin (San Francisco Chronicle) affirmed the show was stiff and robotic. She says, "Stefani gave back to them with a show in which every line, every move and every gesture was carbon-copied from every other show on the tour, excepting the usual local shout-outs. This doesn't mean she's not sincere when she rhapsodizes over the charms of the Bay Area, or gushes about how amazed she is to be a star and how grateful she is to her fans for helping her become one. It simply means she's gone so far into the star-making machinery she's forgotten how to convey that sincerity in anything besides packaged sound bites."

Derek Paiva of The Honolulu Advertiser described Stefani's show in Honolulu as "infectiously energetic". He states, "In times like these, Stefani showed the fun, endearing and still very grateful side of her that all the costume changes, unnecessary stage production, slickly dumb songs and accompanying bling can't bury. Until she returns to Hawai'i with No Doubt — writer crosses his fingers here — this would have to do."

For the concert in San Diego, T. Michael Crowell (San Diego Union-Tribune) said "Stefani is not the best singer in the biz. Her vocal range is narrow, and her pitch is not always dead-on. But that misses the point of her performance. Her art is the imagery she brings to the stage, the Stefani style, her personal fashion statement, her brand. [...] Not bad for the skater-girl next door, now all grown-up and ready for a little fun."

== Opening acts ==
- Akon (North America, select dates)
- Lady Sovereign (North America, select dates)
- Gym Class Heroes (Australasia)
- CSS (Europe)
- Brick & Lace (Camden)
- Plastilina Mosh (Monterrey)
- Maria José (Mexico City)
- The Hall Effect (Bogotá)
- Hoku (Honolulu)
- Sean Kingston (Las Vegas, Tucson, San Diego, Stockton, Oakland, Santa Barbara)

== Setlist ==
The following setlist was obtained from the April 28, 2007 concert, at the Cricket Wireless Pavilion in Phoenix, Arizona. It does not represent all concerts for the duration of the tour.

1. "The Sweet Escape" (performed with Akon)
2. "Rich Girl" (contains elements of the "James Bond Theme")
3. "Yummy"
4. "4 in the Morning"
5. "Luxurious"
6. "Early Winter"
7. "Wind It Up"
8. "Fluorescent"
9. "Danger Zone"
10. "Hollaback Girl"
11. "Now That You Got It"
12. "Don't Get It Twisted" / "Breakin' Up"
13. "Cool"
14. "Wonderful Life"
15. "Orange County Girl"

Encore

16. "The Real Thing"
17. "U Started It"
18. "What You Waiting For?"

== Tour dates ==
Date	City	Country	Venue	Opening Act
North America
April 21, 2007	Las Vegas	United States	Pearl Concert Theater	N/A
April 22, 2007	Chula Vista	United States	Coors Amphitheatre	Akon
April 24, 2007	Fresno	United States	Save Mart Center	Akon
April 25, 2007	Bakersfield	United States	Rabobank Arena	Akon
April 27, 2007	Los Angeles	United States	Gibson Amphitheatre	Lady Sovereign
April 28, 2007	Phoenix	United States	Cricket Wireless Pavilion	Akon; Lady Sovereign
April 30, 2007	West Valley City	United States	E Center	Akon; Lady Sovereign
May 2, 2007	Denver	United States	Pepsi Center	Akon; Lady Sovereign
May 3, 2007	Albuquerque	United States	ABQ Journal Pavilion	Akon; Lady Sovereign
May 5, 2007	Dallas	United States	Smirnoff Music Centre	Akon; Lady Sovereign
May 6, 2007	The Woodlands	United States	Cynthia Woods Mitchell Pavilion	Akon; Lady Sovereign
May 8, 2007	Tampa	United States	Ford Amphitheatre	Akon; Lady Sovereign
May 9, 2007	West Palm Beach	United States	Sound Advice Amphitheatre	Akon; Lady Sovereign
May 11, 2007	Atlanta	United States	HiFi Buys Amphitheatre	Akon; Lady Sovereign
May 12, 2007	Charlotte	United States	Verizon Wireless Amphitheatre	Akon; Lady Sovereign
May 14, 2007	Raleigh	United States	Alltel Pavilion	Akon; Lady Sovereign
May 15, 2007	Virginia Beach	United States	Verizon Wireless Amphitheater	Akon; Lady Sovereign
May 17, 2007	Bristow	United States	Nissan Pavilion	Akon; Lady Sovereign
May 18, 2007	Holmdel	United States	PNC Bank Arts Center	Akon; Lady Sovereign
May 20, 2007	Wantagh	United States	Nikon at Jones Beach Theater	Akon; Lady Sovereign
May 21, 2007	Uncasville	United States	Mohegan Sun Arena	Akon; Lady Sovereign
May 23, 2007	Mansfield	United States	Tweeter Center for the Performing Arts	Akon; Lady Sovereign
May 24, 2007	Camden	United States	Tweeter Center	Brick & Lace
May 27, 2007	Atlantic City	United States	Borgata Events Center	Lady Sovereign
May 29, 2007	Montreal	Canada	Bell Centre	Akon; Lady Sovereign
May 30, 2007	Toronto	Canada	Air Canada Centre	Akon; Lady Sovereign
June 1, 2007	Auburn Hills	United States	The Palace of Auburn Hills	Akon; Lady Sovereign
June 2, 2007	Noblesville	United States	Verizon Wireless Music Center	Akon; Lady Sovereign
June 4, 2007	Omaha	United States	Qwest Center Arena	Akon; Lady Sovereign
June 5, 2007	Saint Paul	United States	Xcel Energy Center	Akon; Lady Sovereign
June 7, 2007	London	Canada	John Labatt Centre	Akon; Lady Sovereign
June 8, 2007	Tinley Park	United States	First Midwest Bank Amphitheatre	Akon; Lady Sovereign
June 10, 2007	Winnipeg	Canada	MTS Centre	Akon; Lady Sovereign
June 12, 2007	Edmonton	Canada	Rexall Place	Akon; Lady Sovereign
June 13, 2007	Calgary	Canada	Pengrowth Saddledome	Akon; Lady Sovereign
June 15, 2007	Vancouver	Canada	General Motors Place	Akon; Lady Sovereign
June 16, 2007	Auburn	United States	White River Amphitheatre	Akon; Lady Sovereign
June 18, 2007	Wheatland	United States	Sleep Train Amphitheatre	Akon; Lady Sovereign
June 19, 2007	Mountain View	United States	Shoreline Amphitheatre	Akon; Lady Sovereign
June 22, 2007	Irvine	United States	Verizon Wireless Amphitheatre	Akon; Lady Sovereign
June 23, 2007	Irvine	United States	Verizon Wireless Amphitheatre	Akon; Lady Sovereign
June 26, 2007	Santa Barbara	United States	Santa Barbara Bowl	Lady Sovereign
June 27, 2007	Santa Barbara	United States	Santa Barbara Bowl	Lady Sovereign
June 29, 2007	Reno	United States	Reno Events Center	Lady Sovereign
June 30, 2007	Las Vegas	United States	MGM Grand Garden Arena	Lady Sovereign
July 13, 2007	Monterrey	Mexico	Arena Monterrey	Plastilina Mosh
July 15, 2007	Mexico City	Mexico	Palacio de los Deportes	Maria José
July 18, 2007	San Juan	Puerto Rico	José Miguel Agrelot Coliseum	N/A
South America
July 21, 2007	Bogotá	Colombia	Plaza de Eventos	The Hall Effect
Oceania
July 26, 2007	Auckland	New Zealand	Vector Arena	Gym Class Heroes
July 28, 2007	Brisbane	Australia	Brisbane Entertainment Centre	Gym Class Heroes
July 30, 2007	Sydney	Australia	Acer Arena	Gym Class Heroes
July 31, 2007	Sydney	Australia	Acer Arena	Gym Class Heroes
August 2, 2007	Melbourne	Australia	Rod Laver Arena	Gym Class Heroes
August 3, 2007	Melbourne	Australia	Rod Laver Arena	Gym Class Heroes
August 5, 2007	Adelaide	Australia	Adelaide Entertainment Centre	Gym Class Heroes
August 7, 2007	Perth	Australia	Burswood Dome	Gym Class Heroes
Asia
August 11, 2007^{[A]}	Chiba	Japan	Chiba Marine Stadium	Gym Class Heroes
August 12, 2007^{[A]}	Osaka	Japan	Maishima Sports Island	Gym Class Heroes
August 14, 2007	Singapore		Singapore Indoor Stadium	Gym Class Heroes
August 16, 2007	Hong Kong		AsiaWorld–Arena	Gym Class Heroes
August 19, 2007	Bangkok	Thailand	Impact Arena	Gym Class Heroes
August 21, 2007	Kuala Lumpur	Malaysia	Putra Indoor Stadium	Gym Class Heroes
Oceania
August 24, 2007	Honolulu	United States	Blaisdell Arena	Hoku
August 25, 2007	Honolulu	United States	Blaisdell Arena	Hoku
Europe
September 10, 2007	Hamburg	Germany	Color Line Arena	CSS
September 12, 2007	Munich	Germany	Zenith	CSS
September 14, 2007	Berlin	Germany	Velodrom	CSS
September 15, 2007	Cologne	Germany	Kölnarena	CSS
September 17, 2007	Paris	France	Palais Omnisports de Paris-Bercy	CSS
September 18, 2007	Rotterdam	Netherlands	Sportpaleis van Ahoy	CSS
September 20, 2007	Glasgow	Scotland	Scottish Exhibition Hall 4	CSS
September 22, 2007	Manchester	England	Manchester Evening News Arena	CSS
September 23, 2007	Newcastle	England	Metro Radio Arena	CSS
September 25, 2007	Birmingham	England	National Indoor Arena	CSS
September 26, 2007	Cardiff	Wales	Cardiff International Arena	CSS
September 28, 2007	London	England	Wembley Arena	CSS
September 29, 2007	London	England	Wembley Arena	CSS
October 1, 2007	Belfast	Northern Ireland	Odyssey Arena	CSS
October 2, 2007	Dublin	Ireland	RDS Simmonscourt	CSS
October 4, 2007	Antwerp	Belgium	Sportpaleis	CSS
October 6, 2007	Zürich	Switzerland	Hallenstadion	CSS
October 7, 2007	Esch-sur-Alzette	Luxembourg	Rockhal	CSS
October 9, 2007	Oslo	Norway	Oslo Spektrum	CSS
October 10, 2007	Stockholm	Sweden	Stockholm Globe Arena	CSS
October 12, 2007	Helsinki	Finland	Hartwall Areena	CSS
October 14, 2007	Copenhagen	Denmark	Forum Copenhagen	CSS
October 16, 2007	Milan	Italy	Datch Forum	CSS
October 17, 2007	Vienna	Austria	Wiener Stadthalle	CSS
October 19, 2007	Budapest	Hungary	László Papp Budapest Sports Arena	CSS
October 20, 2007	Prague	Czech Republic	Sazka Arena	CSS
North America
October 26, 2007	Las Vegas	United States	Pearl Concert Theater	Sean Kingston
October 27, 2007^{[B]}	Anaheim	United States	Honda Center	Timbaland; Nicole Scherzinger
October 29, 2007	Tucson	United States	Anselmo Valencia Tori Amphitheater	Sean Kingston
October 30, 2007	San Diego	United States	Cox Arena	Sean Kingston
November 1, 2007	Stockton	United States	Stockton Arena	Sean Kingston
November 2, 2007	Oakland	United States	Oracle Arena	Sean Kingston
November 3, 2007	Santa Barbara	United States	Santa Barbara Bowl	Sean Kingston

Music festivals and other miscellaneous performances
^{A} This concerts was a part of the Summer Sonic Festival
^{B} This concert was a part of the Homecoming Concert

Cancellations and rescheduled shows

April 21, 2007	Phoenix, Arizona	Cricket Wireless Pavilion	Moved to April 28, 2007
April 28, 2007	Las Vegas, Nevada	Pearl Concert Theater	Moved to April 21, 2007
June 7, 2007	Milwaukee, Wisconsin	Bradley Center	Cancelled
November 8, 2007	Phoenix, Arizona	Dodge Theatre	Cancelled
November 9, 2007	Phoenix, Arizona	Dodge Theatre	Cancelled

=== Box office score data ===
Venue	City	Tickets sold / Available	Gross revenue
Coors Amphitheatre	Chula Vista	14,415 / 19,392 (74%)	$628,109
Save Mart Center	Fresno	9,418 / 11,558 (81%)	$516,726
Rabobank Arena	Bakersfield	8,008 / 8,888 (90%)	$478,171
Gibson Amphitheatre	Los Angeles	6,047 / 6,123 (99%)	$429,825
Cricket Wireless Pavilion	Phoenix	20,101 / 20,101 (100%)	$637,247
E Center	West Valley City	8,947 / 9,749 (92%)	$433,820
PNC Bank Arts Center	Holmdel Township	16,905 / 16,905 (100%)	$667,460
Nikon at Jones Beach Theater	Wantagh	13,417 / 13,842 (97%)	$753,637
Tweeter Center for the Performing Arts	Mansfield	13,309 / 19,067 (70%)	$632,915
Bell Centre	Montreal	12,540 / 13,265 (95%)	$826,489
The Palace of Auburn Hills	Auburn Hills	13,071 / 14,424 (91%)	$657,504
Xcel Energy Center	Saint Paul	11,692 / 15,482 (76%)	$512,698
John Labatt Centre	London	9,048 / 9,214 (98%)	$711,714
First Midwest Bank Amphitheatre	Tinley Park	21,229 / 28,630 (74%)	$573,567
MTS Centre	Winnipeg	8,893 / 11,274 (79%)	$594,843
Rexall Place	Edmonton	12,637 / 13,115 (96%)	$874,964
Pengrowth Saddledome	Calgary	13,957 / 13,957 (100%)	$939,298
General Motors Place	Vancouver	14,503 / 15,496 (94%)	$996,582
White River Amphitheatre	Auburn	14,588 / 19,532 (75%)	$528,040
Shoreline Amphitheatre	Mountain View	19,349 / 22,000 (88%)	$712,381
Verizon Wireless Amphitheatre	Irvine	32,276 / 32,276 (100%)	$1,456,215
Santa Barbara Bowl	Santa Barbara	9,597 / 9,597 (100%)	$695,476
MGM Grand Garden Arena	Las Vegas	8,885 / 9,477 (94%)	$902,029
Palacio de los Deportes	Mexico City	10,676 / 18,345 (58%)	$542,426
Brisbane Entertainment Centre	Brisbane	10,348 / 10,435 (99%)	$870,819
Acer Arena	Sydney	25,468 / 25,468 (100%)	$1,952,763
Blaisdell Arena	Honolulu	13,661 / 13,661 (100%)	$904,998
TOTAL		372,985 / 421,273 (89%)	$20,430,716
