= 4 in the Morning =

2007 single by Gwen Stefani

Single by Gwen Stefani

from the album The Sweet Escape
- Released: May 8, 2007
- Studio: Kingsbury (Los Feliz, California); Electric Lady (New York City); The Nook (Studio City, California)
- Genre: Synth-pop
- Length: 4:51
- Label: Interscope
- Songwriters: Gwen Stefani; Tony Kanal
- Producer: Tony Kanal

Gwen Stefani singles chronology
"The Sweet Escape" (2006)	"4 in the Morning" (2007)	"Now That You Got It" (2007)

Music video
- "4 in the Morning" on YouTube

"4 in the Morning" is a song by American singer Gwen Stefani from her second studio album, The Sweet Escape (2006). It was written by Stefani and co-written and produced by Tony Kanal, with additional production by Mark "Spike" Stent. Interscope Records serviced the song to US contemporary hit radio on May 8, 2007, as the album's third single; elsewhere it was released in June 2007. Described as one of her favorite songs on the album, Stefani began writing the song while pregnant and finished with Kanal, drawing inspiration from Roberta Flack and Billy Idol records.

A 1980s-inspired mid-tempo synthpop ballad, "4 in the Morning" features a light keyboard during its intro through its break, a guitar, synthetic strings and a slick sheen. Lyrically, the song talks about a relationship on the edge, with the protagonist trying to save her love. "4 in the Morning" received generally positive reviews from music critics, who noted it as an improvement over her last singles, while praising its tempo and highlighting her vocals.

"4 in the Morning" failed to replicate the commercial success of previous singles in the United States, peaking at number 54 on the Billboard Hot 100. It was moderately successful elsewhere, peaking within the top-ten in Australia and New Zealand, and the top 20 in several European countries. Its accompanying music video was directed by Stefani's longtime collaborator Sophie Muller, and features Stefani lying in bed and walking around her apartment while performing the song in a melancholic mood. The song was performed during The Sweet Escape Tour and in some concerts Stefani made during 2015.

== Background and release ==
Stefani began working with No Doubt bassist Tony Kanal for her second solo studio album just after finishing the Harajuku Lovers Tour in late 2005, referring to him as her "comfort zone." The two wrote "4 in the Morning" based on a tape of melodies left from working on Stefani's debut album Love. Angel. Music. Baby. (2004). In a webisode detailing the recording process of the album, Stefani stated that she was inspired by ballads such as Roberta Flack's "Killing Me Softly with His Song" and Billy Idol's "Eyes Without a Face", as she wanted a "nice ballad" on the record. It was one of the last songs recorded for the album, with Stefani citing it as one of her favorite songs on The Sweet Escape, because it "brings pleasure to [her] ears." The song was serviced to US contemporary hit radio on May 8, 2007, as the album's third single. A CD single, containing the album version, two remixes and its music video, was released elsewhere on June 22, 2007.

== Composition ==
"4 in the Morning"
A 30-second sample of the song's chorus.

"4 in the Morning" was written by Stefani and Kanal, who was also responsible for its production, while Mark "Spike" Stent provided additional production. Described as a 1980s-inspired mid-tempo synthpop ballad, the track's instrumentation includes a "light" keyboard, which "runs tie the song together from intro through break", a guitar, synthetic strings and a slick sheen. "4 in the Morning" has a mid-tempo beat, which according to some critics is "perfect for a slow dance". Stefani's vocals throughout the song's chorus presents a "fast-talking" approach. Lyrically, "4 in the Morning" talks about transparency in a romantic relationship, with the protagonist pleading for a lover to make up his mind. Bill Lamb of About.com added that the song also deals with a relationship on the edge, which can be seen in the lines: "I'm lying here in the dark, I'm watching you sleep, it hurts a lot." In the chorus, she sings: "I give you everything that I am/I'm handing over everything that I've got/'cause I wanna have a really true love."

== Critical reception ==
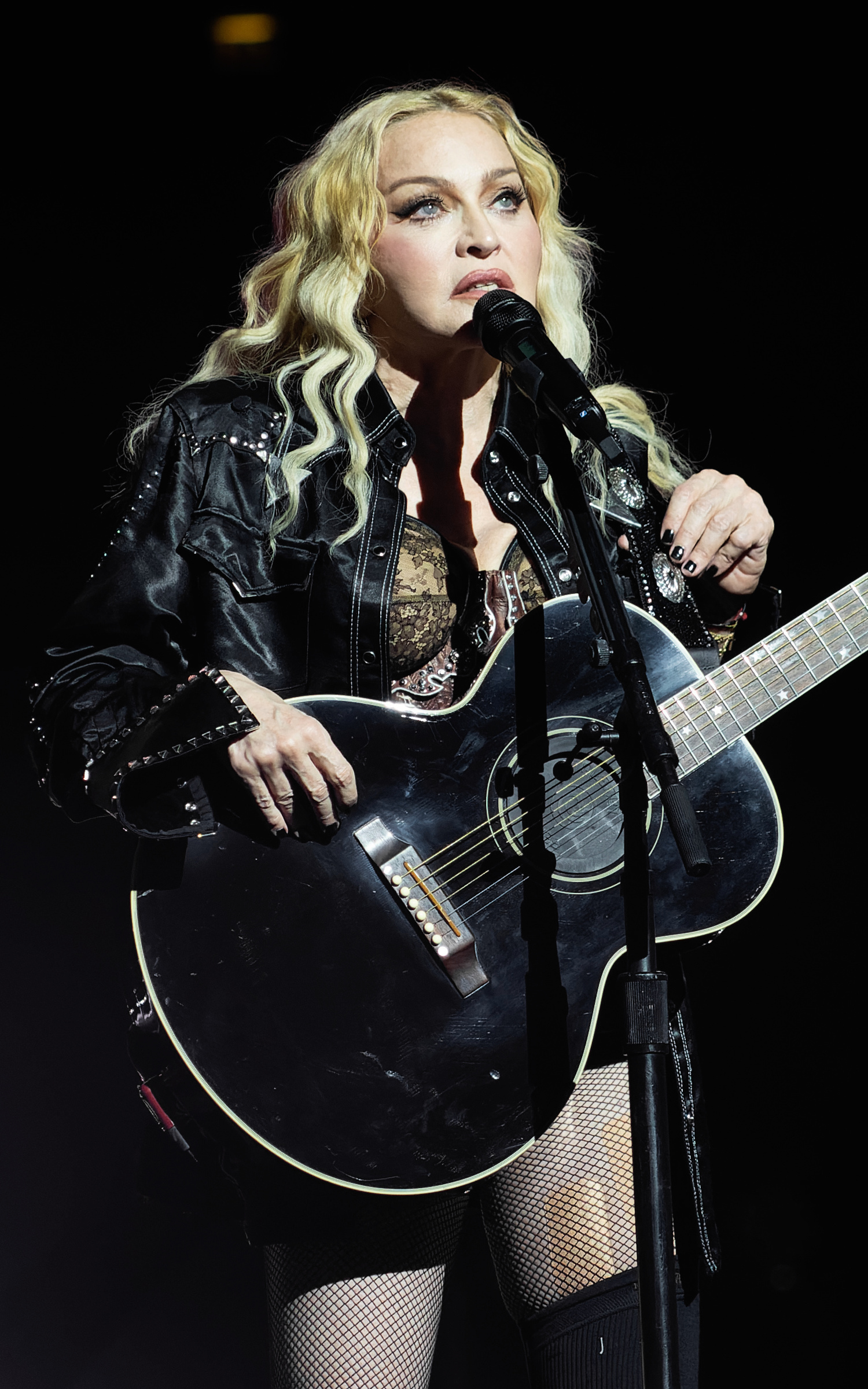
Many critics noted that the song was influenced by Madonna's early records.

"4 in the Morning" received generally positive reviews from music critics. Stephen Thomas Erlewine from AllMusic called it "coolly sensual", noting that "those celebrations of cool synths and stylish pop hooks that work the best for Stefani." Billboard editor Chuck Taylor called it "a melodic retro ballad that could have come from 1983's Flashdance soundtrack", praising the track for "pay[ing] homage to a time when hooks were more meaningful than aligning with hostage-taking producers." Gary Graff of the same publication wrote that "Stefani's Madonna reverence remains intact" on the song, with J. Freedom du Lac from The Washington Post agreeing, noting a "Madonnaism" on the track. Amanda Murray of Sputnikmusic also thought that the song "recalls a 'Crazy for You'-era Madonna", also noting that it is "pure Stefani—and understandably, [it's] far superior to any of her attempts at mimicking other artists." Norman Mayers of Prefix magazine wrote that the song "soar[s] thanks to Stefani's girlish vocals and brilliant hook that reference iconic moments from Madonna and Tears for Fears." Bianca Gracie of Idolator called it "a breezy yet emotive '80s-ballad that highlights her tender vocals." Alex Miller from NME described the song as "an expertly conceived tear-jerker", stating that "[i]t feels like the kind of song a teenage Stefani, miming along to Talk Talk, would have dreamt of singing one day."

Bill Lamb from About.com cited "4 in the Morning" as the best song on the album, calling it "beautifully performed and produced", and noting that Stefani "allows her signature vocals to sensually float and glide through the lyrical content." Similarly, a reviewer for CBBC enjoyed that the song is "a melancholy and reflective ballad about relationships, which is a breath of fresh air for Gwen", praising its "catchy melody and woeful lyrics." Nick Levine from Digital Spy compared it to Robert Palmer's 1986 single "Addicted to Love", writing that "it confirms what is rapidly becoming a universal truth: Gwen Stefani is far more likeable when she channels her new wave roots than when she tries to mould herself into a ghetto fabulous urban hipshaker." Sal Cinquemani from Slant Magazine praised Kanal's production for making the song "less forced and much less self-conscious." Quentin B. Huff from PopMatters referred to it as one of the "few real compositions" from the album. John Murphy from musicOMH agreed, writing that "she sounds great" on "the lovelorn ballad." Pitchfork's Mark Pytlik, however, disapproved of the song, commenting that it destroyed "the mallpop cred that Stefani accrued with Love. Angel. Music. Baby.'s impeccable 'Cool'." Spence D. from IGN was also critical with the song, calling it "the most generic, mainstream, and blasé-blah pop song on the entire album."

== Chart performance ==
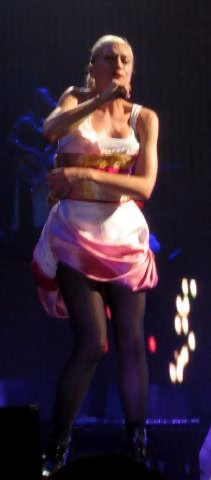
Stefani performing "4 in the Morning" during The Sweet Escape Tour.

In the United States, "4 in the Morning" debuted at number 76 on the US Billboard Hot 100 for the week of June 9, 2007, before peaking at number 54 on the issue dated August 4, becoming Stefani's lowest-peaking solo single on the chart at the time, and her first to miss the top 50. It was more successful on the radio charts, reaching number 16 on both the Mainstream Top 40 and the Adult Top 40 charts. The single was also successful at nightclubs and reached number two on the Dance Club Songs chart. In Canada, the single fared better, where it peaked at number 17 on the Canadian Hot 100, but was more successful outside of North America. In Australia, the single debuted and peaked at number nine on the ARIA Charts, meanwhile it debuted at number 36 and three weeks later it peaked at number five on the New Zealand Singles Chart. It became the album's third top-ten single in both countries.

In the United Kingdom, the single peaked at number 22 on the UK Singles Chart and remained on the chart for 10 weeks. It fared better in the rest of Europe, reaching the top-five in Romania, the top-ten in Finland, and the top 20 in Austria, Germany, Ireland, Italy, the Netherlands, Norway, Slovakia and Switzerland. In France, "4 in the Morning" managed to reach number 21, her first solo single to miss the top 20 since "Cool", which peaked 11 places lower.

== Music video ==
The accompanying music video for "4 in the Morning" was directed by Sophie Muller and features a tearful and distraught Stefani, lying in bed as she begins to sing to the camera. In a white inside-out L.A.M.B. t-shirt, she wanders around her apartment lost and questioning her lover, who is absent from the video. The lyrics describe an argument, which she has with an off-screen lover throughout the video.

After lying around her apartment and crying during a bath, she leaves her house at night and travels in a car, as she sits tearfully in the back. The video ends with Stefani rolling on the bed.

"4 in the Morning" was given a "First Look" on MTV's top-ten chart program Total Request Live on April 26, 2007, and peaked at number seven on May 9. On MuchMusic's Countdown, it became Stefani's second lowest-charting video (next to "Early Winter", which peaked at number 23) since 2005's "Luxurious", peaking at number seven for two consecutive weeks after a slow ascent.

== Track listings ==
- UK and German CD single
1. "4 in the Morning" (album version) – 4:51
2. "4 in the Morning" (Thin White Duke Edit) – 4:55
- Australian and German CD maxi single
1. "4 in the Morning" (album version) – 4:51
2. "4 in the Morning" (Thin White Duke Edit) – 4:55
3. "4 in the Morning" (Oscar the Punk Remix) – 5:41
4. "4 in the Morning" (video) – 4:24

== Personnel ==
Personnel are adapted from the liner notes of The Sweet Escape

- Gwen Stefani – lead vocals, songwriting
- Andrew Alekel – recording
- Matt Beck – guitar
- Greg Collins – additional vocal production, guitar, recording
- Pete Davis – additional keyboards, additional mix programming
- Alex Dromgoole – assistant engineering
- David Emery – assistant engineering
- Brian "Big Bass" Gardner – mastering
- Neil Kanal – programming, recording
- Tony Kanal – keyboards, production, programming, songwriting
- Gabrial McNair – keyboards
- Colin Mitchell – recording
- Dror Mohar – assistant engineering
- Mark "Spike" Stent – additional production, mixing

== Charts ==
=== Weekly charts ===
Weekly chart performance for "4 in the Morning"
Chart (2007)	Peak position
Australia (ARIA)	9
Austria (Ö3 Austria Top 40)	18
Belgium (Ultratop 50 Flanders)	50
Belgium (Ultratip Bubbling Under Wallonia)	3
Canada Hot 100 (Billboard)	17
Canada AC (Billboard)	29
Canada CHR/Top 40 (Billboard)	17
Canada Hot AC (Billboard)	6
CIS Airplay (TopHit)	4
Czech Republic Airplay (ČNS IFPI)	43
Denmark (Tracklisten)	35
Europe (European Hot 100 Singles)	27
Finland (Suomen virallinen lista)	10
France (SNEP)	21
Germany (GfK)	18
Global Dance Tracks (Billboard)	15
Hungary (Dance Top 40)	32
Hungary (Editors' Choice Top 40)	14
Ireland (IRMA)	12
Italy (FIMI)	17
Netherlands (Dutch Top 40)	14
Netherlands (Single Top 100)	27
New Zealand (Recorded Music NZ)	5
Norway (VG-lista)	14
Poland (Airplay Chart)	5
Romania (Romanian Top 100)	4
Russia Airplay (TopHit)	4
Scottish Singles Sales (Official Charts)	19
Slovakia Airplay (ČNS IFPI)	12
Sweden (Sverigetopplistan)	30
Switzerland (Schweizer Hitparade)	18
UK Singles (Official Charts)	22
UK Hip Hop/R&B (Official Charts)	3
Ukraine Airplay (TopHit)	32
US Billboard Hot 100	54
US Adult Contemporary (Billboard)	25
US Adult Pop Airplay (Billboard)	16
US Dance Club Songs (Billboard)	2
US Pop 100 (Billboard)	30
US Pop Airplay (Billboard)	16

=== Year-end charts ===
2007 year-end chart performance for "4 in the Morning"
Chart (2007)	Position
Australia (ARIA)	79
CIS Airplay (TopHit)	26
Netherlands (Dutch Top 40)	89
New Zealand (RIANZ)	26
Romania (Romanian Top 100)	17
Russia Airplay (TopHit)	21
Switzerland (Schweizer Hitparade)	92
US Dance Club Play (Billboard)	16

2008 year-end chart performance for "4 in the Morning"
Chart (2008)	Position
CIS Airplay (TopHit)	154
Russia Airplay (TopHit)	149

=== Decade-end charts ===
Decade-end chart performance for "4 in the Morning"
Chart (2000–2009)	Position
CIS Airplay (TopHit)	62
Russia Airplay (TopHit)	49

== Certifications ==
Certifications for "4 in the Morning"
Region	Certification	Certified units/sales
Australia (ARIA)	Platinum	70,000^{^}
New Zealand (RMNZ)	Gold	7,500^{*}
United States (RIAA)	Gold	500,000^{‡}
^{*} Sales figures based on certification alone.^{^} Shipments figures based on certification alone.^{‡} Sales+streaming figures based on certification alone.

== Release history ==
Release dates and formats for "4 in the Morning"
Region	Date	Format	Label	Ref.
United States	May 8, 2007	Contemporary hit radio	Interscope	
Germany	June 22, 2007	CD single; CD maxi single; digital download	Universal	
Australia	June 23, 2007	CD maxi single; digital download	Universal	
United Kingdom	June 25, 2007	CD single; digital download	Polydor	
