= Early Winter =

2008 single by Gwen Stefani

Single by Gwen Stefani

from the album The Sweet Escape
- Released: January 18, 2008
- Studio: Home Recordings (London, England)
- Genre: Soft rock; synth-pop
- Length: 4:44
- Label: Interscope
- Songwriters: Gwen Stefani; Tim Rice-Oxley
- Producer: Nellee Hooper

Gwen Stefani singles chronology
"Now That You Got It" (2007)	"Early Winter" (2008)	"Glycerine" (2012)

Music video
- "Early Winter" on YouTube

"Early Winter" is a song by American singer Gwen Stefani from her second solo studio album, The Sweet Escape (2006). Written by Stefani and English pianist Tim Rice-Oxley, the song was released in Europe as the album's fifth and final single on January 18, 2008, by Interscope Records. Musically, "Early Winter" is a soft rock and synth-pop ballad with new wave influences. Critics found it similar to songs by English alternative rock band Keane, of which Rice-Oxley is a member. The lyrics of the song describe the nearing of the end of a relationship, and were speculated to be references to Stefani's own relationship with husband Gavin Rossdale.

Upon its release, "Early Winter" received generally positive reviews from music critics, many of whom commended Stefani's vocal delivery and the song's emotional appeal. The song attained moderate commercial success across Europe, reaching number six in Germany and Slovakia, number 12 in Switzerland, and number 14 in Finland. An accompanying music video for "Early Winter" was directed by Sophie Muller and was filmed in destinations like Budapest, Milan, and Prague. It contains scenes of Stefani in a palace-like hall in various gowns and at railway stations. "Early Winter" was included in the setlist of The Sweet Escape Tour, and the performances featured a special coda section delivered by American musician and bassist Gail Ann Dorsey.

== Background ==
"She likes to write from the heart. She's obviously quite an emotional person. Within 10 minutes of us sitting down, she was crying. I played her a little bit of a thing that I'd been working on just before she came in and she welled up about it."

—Tim Rice-Oxley, on recording "Early Winter" with Stefani.

"Early Winter" was written by Tim Rice-Oxley, pianist of English alternative rock band Keane, and Gwen Stefani for the latter's second solo studio album The Sweet Escape (2006). The production of the song was handled by Nellee Hooper. Before working with Rice-Oxley in the studio, Stefani called him to discuss some of her ideas behind a potential song, saying "I wanted a ballad. I wanted to write 'Eyes Without a Face' or 'Killing Me Softly' or 'Time After Time,' and he was like, 'OK, Cyndi Lauper, got it,' like he was taking my order." In the studio, Rice-Oxley played "Early Winter" on a piano, and after hearing the song, Stefani approved of it and commented, "It was so beautiful and addictive. I didn't really attack it because it was kind of done, lyrics and everything." After letting the song "sit with her for a bit", she rewrote some of the lyrics.

Stefani was the first artist Rice-Oxley wrote a song for outside of Keane, and the singer remarked that "he's like Clark Kent-subtle, but Superman-talented. I'm lucky I was his first, because I'm sure he's going to go write with lots of girls after me." Rice-Oxley would later collaborate with artists like Australian singer Kylie Minogue, and in a 2012 interview, he talked about working with her and Stefani, saying, "I've been very lucky to work with people at the top of the industry. Both were very talented and more creative than I think they're given credit for. They're both very good writers and singers and they both work so hard, just grafting the whole time. Honing those pop sensibilities through writing with them was good fun".

== Composition ==
"Early Winter" (2008)
Stefani's vocals in "Early Winter" are "full of longing, heartache and regret".

Musically, "Early Winter" is a "sleek, surging" soft rock and synth-pop ballad. Similar to Stefani's work with her band No Doubt, it is highly influenced by new wave music. Clark Collis from Entertainment Weekly dubbed it a "tortured and not un-Keane-like lament". The lyrics of "Early Winter" are based on issues related to the end of a relationship, and Jennifer Vineyard from MTV described them to be "poignant lyrics about a couple recognizing the beginning of the end". In the song, Stefani metaphorically compares the end of her relationship with her partner to falling leaves. It was speculated that the song was a reference to Stefani's own relationship with English musician and husband Gavin Rossdale.

== Release and promotion ==
"Early Winter" was chosen as the fifth and final single from The Sweet Escape, and was released in Europe as a CD single on January 25, 2008, by Interscope Records. It was made available for digital download on the iTunes Store on January 18. "Early Winter" was included on the setlist of The Sweet Escape Tour. The performance of the song included a coda section, which was delivered by American musician and bassist Gail Ann Dorsey. Joan Anderman of The Boston Globe viewed "Early Winter" as a "winsome anthem" and Dorsey's coda performance "thrilling".

== Critical reception ==
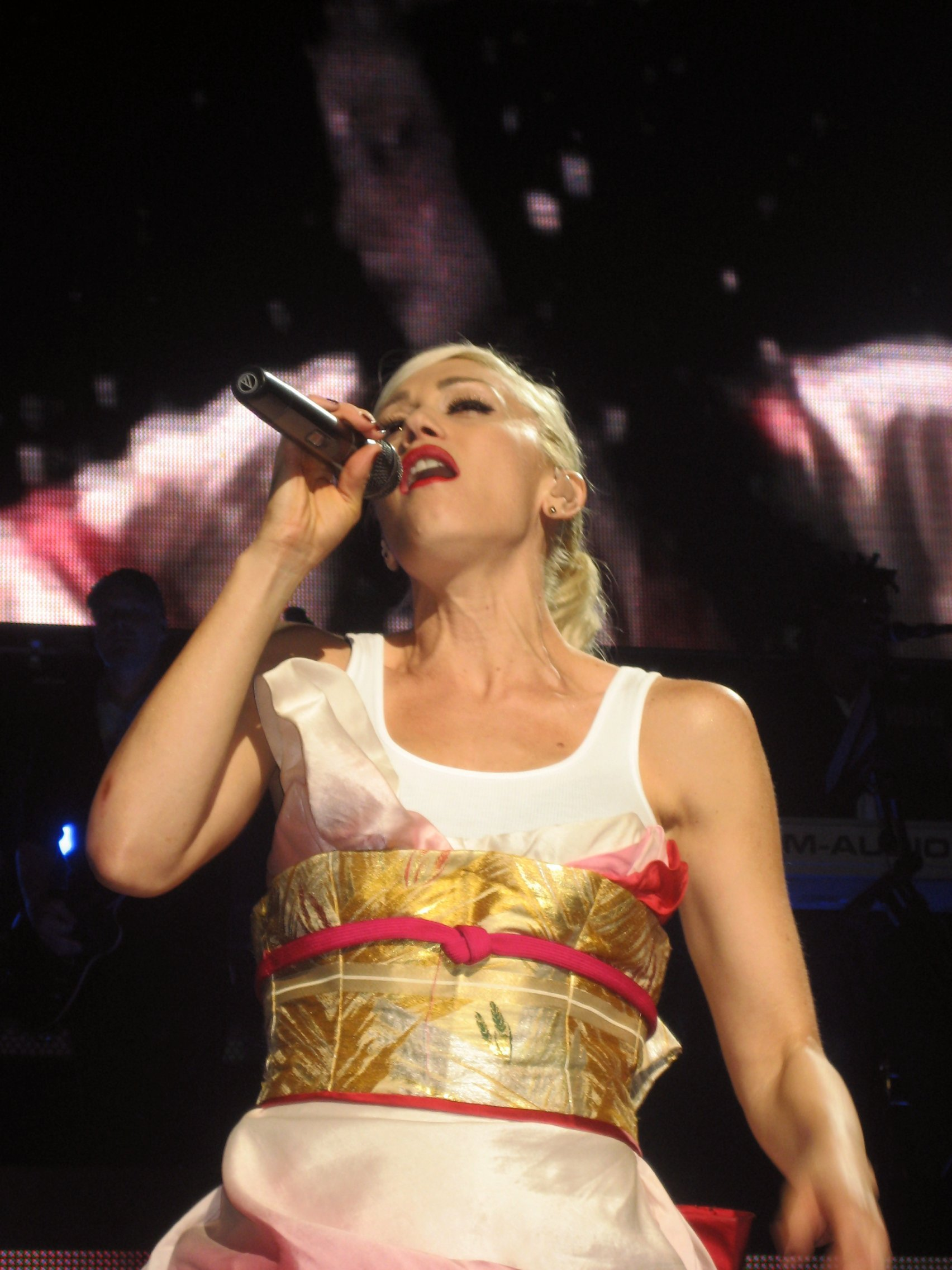
Stefani performing "Early Winter" during The Sweet Escape Tour, for which she wore "impossible folds of pink and gold fabric"

The song received generally positive reviews from music critics. Andy Battaglia of The A.V. Club praised Stefani's vocal delivery, saying her "nasal voice suits the whiny sentiment of the subject matter" and opining that she "sounds most commanding in songs that flirt with blush-making drippiness". Nick Levine of Digital Spy rated "Early Winter" four out of five stars, and complimented its emotional nature, naming it a "forgotten classic from an eighties movie soundtrack" and deeming it "the most affecting moment of Stefani's solo career to date". John Murphy of musicOMH called the song "rather nice" and appreciated its lyrical content, although he commented that "it does sound like Stefani covering a Keane song". Alex Miller of NME complimented Rice-Oxley's involvement in "Early Winter" and singled it out as "one of the few potential hits" from The Sweet Escape. Mark Pytlik of Pitchfork picked "Early Winter" as one of the highlights from the album and favoured Stefani's vocal delivery, noting that the song "proves that Stefani still has the ability to elevate an otherwise ordinary rock song to another level". Sal Cinquemani of Slant Magazine complimented "Early Winter" for being "less forced and much less self-conscious" in comparison to the rest of the songs on The Sweet Escape, and felt that "it's refreshing to hear Stefani in her more natural habitat".

== Commercial performance ==
"Early Winter" made its first chart appearance on the Slovak Airplay Chart in October 2007, debuting at number 95 and later peaking at number six in its 13th week on the chart. In the Czech Republic, the song peaked at number 19 on the airplay chart, six weeks after debuting at number 58 in November 2007. The single entered the Finnish Singles Chart at number 15 in January 2008, peaking at number 14 the following week and spending three weeks altogether on the chart. On the German Singles Chart, "Early Winter" debuted and peaked at number six on February 8, 2008, becoming Stefani's second highest-peaking single in the country, alongside "The Sweet Escape" (2006). During the same week, the song debuted at number 49 on the Austrian Singles Chart, reaching its peak position of number 22 in its ninth week on the chart. After debuting at number 52 on the Swiss Singles Chart on February 17, 2008, the single climbed to number 12 in its ninth week and spent a total of 20 weeks on the chart. In Hungary, it peaked at number 17 on the airplay chart for the week ending May 4, 2008.

== Music video ==
The music video for "Early Winter" was directed by Stefani's frequent collaborator Sophie Muller, who had previously directed the music videos for "Cool" and "Wind It Up". Filming of the music video took place at destinations like Budapest, Milan, and Prague, where Stefani had been touring during The Sweet Escape Tour in October 2007. It opens with a black-and-white scene of Stefani lying on the ground in a long white gown. In the next scene, Stefani is shown walking on the street under red street lights and then holds her love interest, played by her tour backup dancer Steelo Vazquez, against the wall and talks to him. The scene then changes to Stefani walking on a street and later walking into the railway station. In the next scene, Stefani is seen singing under falling red-colored feathers in a huge palace-type hall. Scenes of Stefani staring at herself in the mirror with her hair up and snow falling slowly down, with the lights turning on and off intermittently, are interspersed throughout the video. Stefani is also seen sitting on the ground and singing while crying. She is then shown at a railway station walking besides a moving train. The video ends with Stefani running out of the hall. Tamar Anitai from MTV Buzzworthy praised the video for being "acutely artful, immeasurably stylish" and commented that "Gwen's managed to raise the bar on her own superlatively supreme style in her new video."

== Track listing ==
- European limited 2-track CD single and digital download
1. "Early Winter" (Album Version) – 4:44
2. "Early Winter" (Live) – 6:53

== Personnel ==
Personnel are adapted from the liner notes of The Sweet Escape.

- Gwen Stefani – lead vocals, songwriting
- Greg Collins – bass guitar, recording
- Pete Davis – additional keyboards, additional programming
- Alex Dromgoole – engineering assistance
- David Emery – engineering assistance
- Nellee Hooper – production
- Aidan Love – programming
- Mark Ralph – guitar
- Tim Rice-Oxley – keyboards, piano, songwriting
- Ian Rossiter – engineering assistance
- Mark "Spike" Stent – additional production, mixing

== Charts ==
=== Weekly charts ===
Weekly chart performance for "Early Winter"
Chart (2008)	Peak position
Austria (Ö3 Austria Top 40)	22
Belgium (Ultratip Bubbling Under Flanders)	10
CIS Airplay (TopHit)	109
Czech Republic (Rádio – Top 100)	19
Europe (European Hot 100 Singles)	26
Finland (Suomen virallinen lista)	14
Germany (GfK)	6
Hungary (Rádiós Top 40)	17
Romania (Romanian Top 100)	40
Russia Airplay (TopHit)	105
Slovakia (Rádio Top 100)	6
Switzerland (Schweizer Hitparade)	12
Ukraine Airplay (TopHit)	85

=== Year-end charts ===
Year-end chart performance for "Early Winter"
Chart (2008)	Position
Germany (Media Control GfK)	66
Hungary (Rádiós Top 40)	75
Switzerland (Schweizer Hitparade)	74
