= Big Eye Records =

Big Eye Music
- Founded: 2000
- Genre: Pop, country, hard rock, dance, hip hop
- Country of origin: United States
- Location: Los Angeles, California
- Official website: bigeyemusicrecordings.com

Big Eye Music is a Los Angeles-based production company and independent record label founded in 2000. Big Eye Music was the first label to focus exclusively on cover, karaoke, and instrumental versions of songs from a wide variety of genres, including rock, hip hop, country, and K-pop. The label also specializes in acoustic, symphonic, and lounge renditions of Billboard Hot 100 hits.

== Charts ==
Chart (2008)	Peak position
U.S. Billboard Hot 100	29
Canadian Hot 100	16
Hot Canadian Digital Singles	8

== K-POP All-Start ==
This artist collective, specializing in Korean Pop music, saw their version of PSY’s smash hit single “Gangnam Style” out sell the original version in Japan. The track climbed as high as No. 67 on the iTunes Japan singles chart.

== See also ==
- List of record labels
