= Jill Greenberg =

Canadian-American photographer

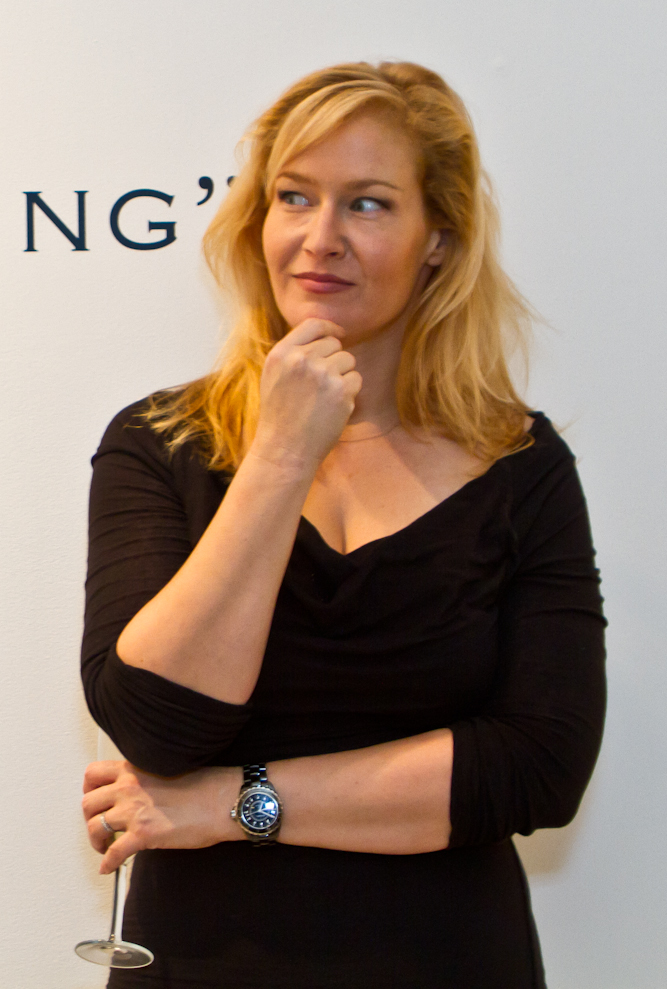
- Greenberg in 2011
- Born: July 10, 1967 (age 59); Montreal, Quebec, Canada
- Known for: Photographer
- Website: jillgreenberg.com

Jill Greenberg (born July 10, 1967) is a Canadian-born American photographer and Pop artist. She is known for her portraits and fine art work that often features anthropomorphized animals that have been digitally manipulated with painterly effects. Her photography of animals is regarded for its capability to show a wide range of expressions and feelings that are comparable to that of a seasoned actor or actress. Some of the primates she has captured on film are actually celebrates in their own right, having been featured in different TV shows or movies. She is also highly recognized for her distinct, and stylized photography of celebrities including well known performers such as Gwen Stefani, Arnold Schwarzenegger and Clint Eastwood. She is also known for inserting her own strong opinions into her work. In reference to her work Greenberg states "They're portraits and they're personal but there's a little twist going on. An edge."

Greenberg is frequently employed by companies including Sony Pictures, Interview, Rolling Stone, Time, GQ, DreamWorks, Target, Microsoft, and HBO.

== Biography ==
Greenberg was born in Montreal, Quebec, Canada, and grew up in a suburb of Detroit, Michigan.

Greenberg began photography when she was 9 years old. According to a 1998 New York Times article, Greenberg's mother was a computer programmer and her father was a doctor.

Greenberg took classes at Cranbrook Academy of Art and the Detroit Institute of Arts. In 1984, she attended the Photography Summer Session held by Parsons School of Design in Paris. In 1985, she won a Traub Memorial Scholarship Travel Fund from Andover High School in Bloomfield Hills, Michigan.

In 1988, Greenberg completed coursework on "Semiotics in Media" with Mary Ann Doane at Brown University. In 1989, she graduated with honors from the Rhode Island School of Design with a BFA in Photography.

== Photography career ==
In 1992, Greenberg began working for Sassy magazine, doing commercial photography while working on getting her artistic career off the ground.

Greenberg is known for celebrity portraits, using painterly effects that are drawn using computer technology.

2011's Glass Ceiling series involved shooting under water, using scuba gear. She hired professional synchronized swimmers and photographed them in a pool in Culver City. The Glass Ceiling series was featured as a billboard installation in Los Angeles, on the northwest corner of Sunset Boulevard at Fairfax (viewable while driving east).

In October 2012, Greenberg published a book of photographs called Horse that features images of horses. Greenberg built photo studios within horse rings to take the photographs. Shooting took place in Los Angeles in an area called Walker's Basin and also in Vancouver at Danny Virtue's ranch, a man who supplies horses to the film industry.

In January 2014, Greenberg had an exhibition in Canada of images from "Horse."

In August 2008, The Atlantic asked her to photograph John McCain for the magazine's October 2008 cover. Greenberg said they didn't have enough money to pay her so she gave them license to use one of her photos for the cover (while she retained ownership of the photo) for free, for one time use. Greenberg decided to make some personal images of the pictures. "I really didn't want there to be another Republican in the White House, so I decided to put my McCain pictures out on voting day." Saying she saw the work as political cartoons. "I thought it was the Artist Jill Greenberg appropriating the work of the Commercial Photographer Jill Greenberg."

== Contributions and influence ==
=== Artistic style ===
Greenberg is credited by some within the commercial photography industry as having produced several unique styles that have since been emulated by other photographers. "Like LaChapelle and Avedon, Jill has pioneered a new style of photography, and her impact can be seen throughout the entertainment industry", the creative director of a Los Angeles creative agency told Brief magazine, with the publication itself characterizing her work as employing "distinctive ethereal backlighting." A president of NBC Entertainment Marketing who has employed Greenberg on a number of occasions due to what he terms her "distinct and innovative aesthetic" observed that "many other photographers follow her lead."

In 1995, Greenberg branded her first website the moniker "The Manipulator" after the 80s German photography magazine'

Greenberg has acknowledged having made particular use of digital post production, adapting the nickname "The Manipulator" early in her career due in part to her relatively early adoption of Photoshop, a product she has used since its release in 1990. Nonetheless, she told an interviewer in 2011 that some of what her fans believe to be post production is instead the result of close attention to lighting, merely supplemented with minor "flourishes" afterwards.

=== Feminist theory ===
Greenberg's work and career has focused intermittently on feminist issues, starting with her senior thesis at RISD, "The Female Object". Her more recent Glass Ceiling series stems from a commercial shoot in which Greenberg was asked to photograph members of the U.S. Olympic Synchronized Swim Team swimming in high heels, an element that heightens sexuality while also hampering ability. According to a press release/bio released ahead of an exhibition and talk, "The result is a sadly relevant series of shots depicting women struggling to keep head above water in a context defined by the constraints pressed upon them by others."

== Awards ==
- 1997 Award of Excellence, Communications Arts Annual
- 2004 Self-Promo Award – 2nd Place, PDN/Nikon Self Promotion
- 2005 Special Book – 2nd Place, PDN/Nikon Self Promotion
- 2006 Award of Excellence, Communications Arts Photography Annual
- 2006 Direct Mail Award – 1st Place, PDN/Nikon Self Promotion
- 2006 Print Placement – 2nd Place, PDN/Nikon Self Promotion
- 2007 AP23 American Photography
- 2007 Society of Publication Designers – Silver Medal
- 2008 Nominee, New York Photo Awards, Advertising (single)
- 2008 Society for Publications Designers - Merit Award, Glamour
- 2008 Society for Publications Designers - Merit Award, Women's Health
- 2008 Society for Publications Designers - Merit Award, GQ
- 2008 Society for Publications Designers - Merit Award, Wired
- 2008 Society for Publications Designers - Gold Medal, GQ, "Violence of the Lambs"
- 2009 AP25 American Photography
- 2009 PDN PIX Digital Imaging
- 2009 Society for Publication Designers
- 2010 AP26 American Photography
- 2010 PDN PIX Digital Imaging
- 2011 SPD Cover of the Day, Chakota Magazine, May 27
- 2011 Key Art Awards Transit Campaign "One Born Every Minute"
- 2011 American Photographic Artists award winner. Second Place in Fine Art category
- 2012 AP28 American Photography "Thomas Jane Mapplethorpe homage"
- 2012 AI-AP American Illustration-American Photography The Archine - Motion Category "Entitled"
- 2012 American Photo Cover of "Images of the Year"
- 2013 Graphis Photography Annual Platinum in Animal Category
- 2013 SPD Cover of the Day Entertainment Weekly June 14
- 2014 Graphis Photography Annual 2013 Platinum Award
- 2015 PDN Photo Annual

== Controversy ==
=== End Times ===
End Times, 2013 photo-book containing 32 photos from the End Times photo series

Greenberg's End Times, a series of photographs featuring toddlers, was the subject of controversy in 2006 (April 22 – July 8). The work featured stylized hyper-real closeups of children's faces contorted by various emotional distresses. The pieces were titled to reflect Greenberg's frustration with both the Bush administration and Christian Fundamentalism in the United States.

The children were either professionally hired or were the children of friends (and included her daughter). All were accompanied by their parents, who assisted in getting the children to cry.

The series resulted in active, often heated online discussion and news coverage, and resulted in hate mail which continued for several years.

The images, meanwhile, have been imitated and used without permission for unrelated campaigns.

== Personal life ==
Greenberg met her now ex-husband Robert "Rob" Green in Los Angeles after moving there in 2000. Greenberg moved back to New York City in 2013 with her family for her husband's position as SVP, Creative-Digital at Condé Nast Entertainment.

Greenberg and Green have two children, daughter Violet and son Zed.

== Works or publications ==
=== Books ===
- Greenberg, Jill. Monkey Portraits. New York: Bulfinch Press, 2006. ISBN 978-0-8212-5-7555
- Greenberg, Jill. Bear Portraits. New York: Little, Brown, 2009. ISBN 978-0-316-03-1882
- Greenberg, Jill, and A M. Homes. Horses. New York: Rizzoli International Pub, 2012. ISBN 978-0-8478-3-8660
- Greenberg, Jill, Brian P. Clamp, Jo-Ann Conklin, and Paul Wombell. End Times. Alcobendas: TF, 2012. ISBN 978-1-938922-07-7

=== Videos ===
- Jill Greenberg: How Much Do You Push the Envelope? 99U Conference (New York, NY), 2009

== Selected exhibitions ==
- Jill Greenberg: Monkey Portraits at Kopeikin Gallery, Los Angeles. (October 23 – December 11, 2004)
- Jill Greenberg: End Times at Kopeikin Gallery, Los Angeles. (April 22 – July 8, 2006)
- Jill Greenberg: Monkey Portraits at ClampArt, New York. (October 12 – November 11, 2006)
- Jill Greenberg: End Times / Ursine at ClampArt, New York. (October 11 – November 24, 2007)
- Jill Greenberg: New Bears at ClampArt, New York. (November 5 – December 19, 2009)
- Jill Greenberg: Glass Ceiling at ClampArt, New York. (June 16 – August 19, 2011)
- Jill Greenberg: Horse at ClampArt, New York. (October 18 – December 21, 2012)
- Jill Greenberg: Horse at O'Born Contemporary, Toronto. (January 31 – March 15, 2014)
