= Now That You Got It =

2007 single by Gwen Stefani

Single by Gwen Stefani featuring Damian Marley

from the album The Sweet Escape
- Released: August 26, 2007
- Recorded: 2006
- Studio: Henson (Hollywood); Sony Music (New York City)
- Genre: Hip hop; reggae
- Length: 2:59
- Label: Interscope
- Songwriters: Gwen Stefani; Sean Garrett; Kaseem Dean
- Producer: Swizz Beatz

Gwen Stefani singles chronology
"4 in the Morning" (2007)	"Now That You Got It" (2007)	"Early Winter" (2008)

Damian Marley singles chronology
"All Night" (2006)	"Now That You Got It" (2007)	"As We Enter" (2010)

Music video
- "Now That You Got It" (hybrid mix) on YouTube

"Now That You Got It" is a song by American singer and songwriter Gwen Stefani from her second solo studio album, The Sweet Escape (2006). Stefani co-wrote the song with its producers Sean Garrett and Swizz Beatz. "Now That You Got It" is a reggae song featuring hip hop beats, staccato piano sample and military snare drums. Lyrically, the song places Gwen asking her lover to give all that she wants. A remix featuring Damian Marley was produced for the song's release as the album's fourth single on August 26, 2007, by Interscope Records.

The original solo version received mixed reviews from music critics, with some praising its catchiness, while others calling it repetitive. However, the remix version was more praised, being called "a laid back, summery tune". Commercially, the single experienced minor success, reaching the top-forty in six countries, while failing to gain impact in the United States and the United Kingdom. The song's music video was directed by The Saline Project and was shot in Puerto Rico and Jamaica, featuring Stefani and the Harajuku Girls. The song was performed during The Sweet Escape Tour (2007).

== Background and release ==
Before going on tour with her Harajuku Lovers Tour (2005), Stefani revealed that she was going to release a second album in 2006, stating: "I have a bunch of leftover tracks from making 'Love. Angel. Music. Baby.'. And two months ago, Pharrell called me up, he was like, 'Come down to Miami and write some more songs!' And I'm like, 'OK!' I went down there and wrote four songs and played three of them tonight. They're really fresh". In September 2006, during the Fashion Week, MTV News interviewed Swizz Beatz and he said to be working with Stefani as well, claiming: "She's always taking it to the next level. I love her background for music. She likes a lot of Caribbean sounds with hard beats". They worked on "Now That You Got It", which was selected to be the fourth single from The Sweet Escape (2006). For the single version, Stefani enlisted Damian Marley, son of Jamaican reggae musician Bob Marley, giving the single a "reggae" feel to it. It was released to mainstream radio in the United States, on August 26, 2007, while in the United Kingdom, it was released on October 15, 2007. Two remixes were included on the CD single, both featuring Marley. The "remix" version uses the same instrumentation as the original single, but has a more reggae-infused rendition and an added verse sung by Marley; the "hybrid" version features the song's original beat mixed with the remix version.

== Composition and lyrics ==
"Now That You Got It" was written by Gwen Stefani, Sean Garrett and Swizz Beatz, with production being done by the latter two; Garrett also provided background vocals. The single version of the song features a "loping hip-hop beat and a staccato piano sample" while Stefani "splits wailing time with a chorus of alarms," according to Mark Pytlik of Pitchfork Media. It also presents elements of reggae music and "military snare drums" mixed with crunk militarism. Lyrically, on "Now That You Got It", the singer tells her lover that even though he is with her, he still has to work hard to keep her and give her everything she wants. "Now that you got it, what you gon' do about it?", she repeatedly asks in the chorus.

== Critical reception ==
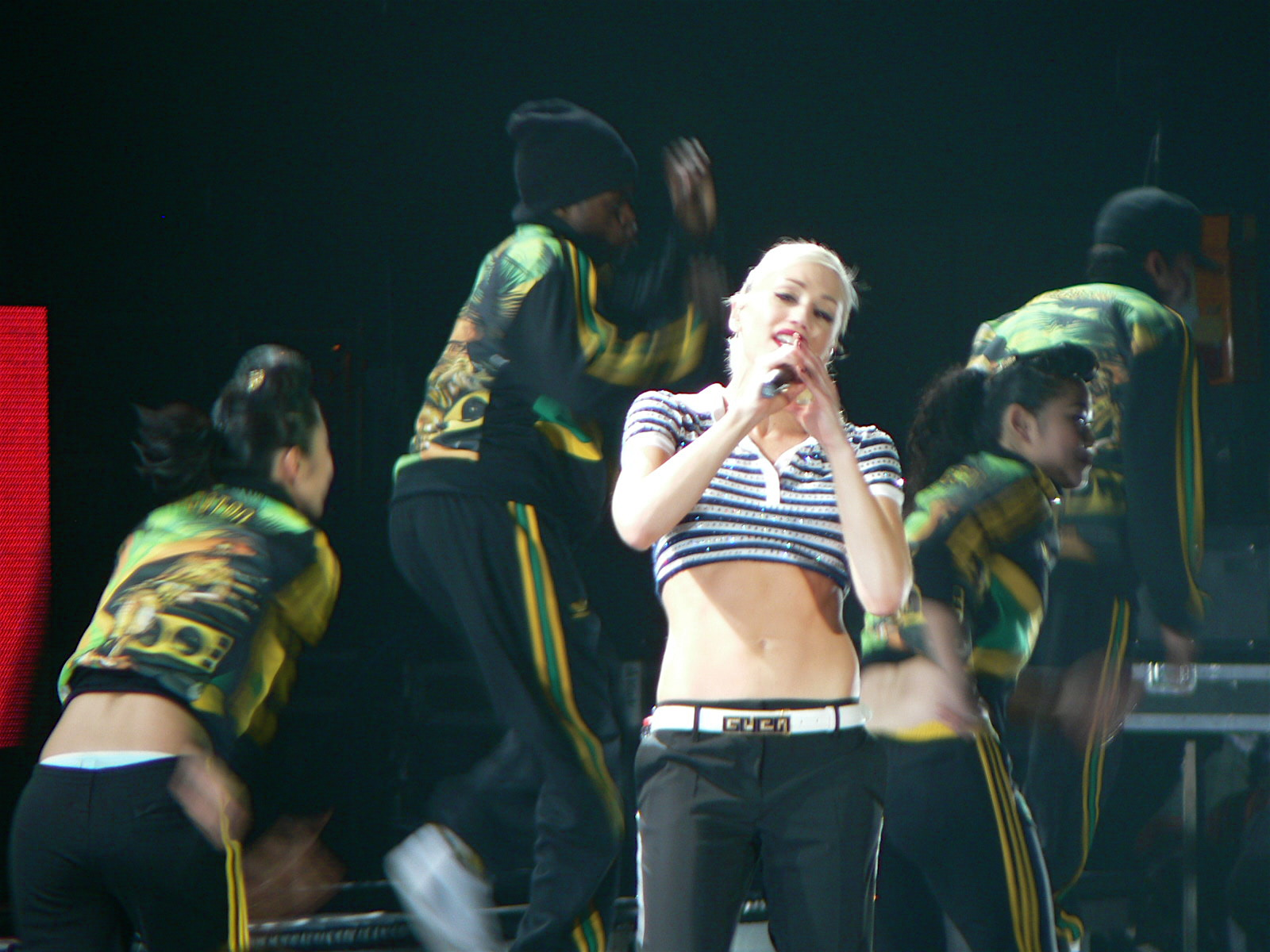
Stefani performing "Now That You Got It" on The Sweet Escape Tour

"Now That You Got It" received mixed reviews from music critics. A positive review came from Charles Merwin of Stylus Magazine, who referred to the original version as Stefani's best "Beastie Boy imitation over a '1 Thing' rip", and Sal Cinquemani, while reviewing the album, of Slant Magazine called it "instantly contagious". Norman Mayers of Prefix Magazine praised Swizz Beatz for "coming up with the most likely heir to the Hollaback crown, with the bumping chants and boasting raps". However, Alex Miller of the NME characterized it as "a track so desperate to be a club banger, its fraying tapestry of hand-claps, sirens and triumphalism has all the grace of a Pepsi Max advert". Quentin B. Huff of PopMatters criticized the song's songwriting, calling it "woefully thin, relying on tedious repetition." John Murphy of musicOMH gave the single a mixed review, writing "when the self-consciously wacky and kitsch side to her personality surfaces, as on the inane 'Now That You Got It', the temptation is to dive for the 'off' switch".

The single version with Damian Marley received generally favorable reviews. Fraser McAlpine of the BBC Chart Blog conveyed it as a "perfect case" of Stefani making songs which are sleek and tough on the outside, but have a middle which is pure and vulnerable, ultimately rating it four out of five stars. Similarly, CBBC's Newsround portrayed the sound as "a very laid back, summery tune" which, it claims, will still have its readers "humming it next week".

== Commercial performance ==
"Now That You Got It" had moderate success on the charts. Nevertheless, in the United States, it was commercially unsuccessful, not entering any of the US Billboard charts, making it Stefani's first song as a solo artist to not do so. Internationally, it reached the top-twenty in a few European countries, having its higher chart position in Norway, where it debuted and peaked at number seventeen. However, it became her lowest-charting single there. In Austria, it became her second lowest-charting single, peaking at number sixty, with "Luxurious" being her lowest at number sixty-six. In the United Kingdom, it reached number fifty-nine, becoming Stefani's third UK release not to reach the top-twenty of the UK Singles Chart. In Australasia, the single performed very moderately. It debuted at number 39 on the ARIA Charts and reaching its peak position, number 37, the following week. It remained for five weeks on the charts, but was her lowest-peaking solo single. On the other hand, in New Zealand, "Now That You Got It" spent eight weeks on the charts, debuting at number 36, on October 1, 2007, and peaking at number 21, on October 8, 2007. However, it became her only solo single to miss the top-twenty there.

== Music video ==
The song's accompanying music video was directed by The Saline Project and was shot in Puerto Rico and Jamaica. The Puerto Rico scenes were shot a day after Stefani's concert in the city, as part of The Sweet Escape Tour, on July 19, 2007. Many parts of the video were shot in a studio, including scenes of Stefani riding a motorcycle in front of a green screen. The video premiered on MTV's Total Request Live on September 4, 2007.

=== Storyline ===
Stefani and the Harajuku Girls on red, yellow, and green scooters.

The video opens up on a mountain with titles "Gwen Stefani Presents", "Now That You Got It" and "featuring Damian Jr. Gong Marley". Stefani is singing against a wall with Marley and later Stefani and the Harajuku Girls are riding along the road with scooters singing the first verse. As the chorus begins and Stefani, the Harajuku Girls and Marley are playing board games under a shelter near the lake side. Marley then begins to sing his part near two sheds while Stefani and Harajuku Girls are still on their scooters. During the second verse, Stefani sings against another girl and shows the Harajuku Girls singing on roof tops with the male dancers from The Sweet Escape Tour (Flea, Legacy, Remedy, and Steelo). During the second chorus, the video opens at the beach where Stefani is SMSing. This leads the video to a party at night time where Stefani is on stage with people dancing. The video concludes with Harajuku Girls and the boys atop the roof, with Stefani and the girls singing on the scooters.

== Live performances ==
Stefani's first performance of the track was on the UK's television show Ant & Dec on September 29, 2007. She performed the original version of the song, but ended with a reggae mix. The song was also added on the setlist of The Sweet Escape Tour. The concert segment received positive feedback for the overall energy of the performance.

== Track listings ==
- Australian CD single
1. "Now That You Got It" (album version) – 3:00
2. "Now That You Got It" (remix featuring Damian "Jr Gong" Marley) – 3:26
3. "Now That You Got It" (single version featuring Damian "Jr Gong" Marley) – 3:09
- European CD maxi single
1. "Now That You Got It" (album version) – 3:00
2. "Now That You Got It" (remix featuring Damian "Jr Gong" Marley) – 3:26
3. "Now That You Got It" (single version featuring Damian "Jr Gong" Marley) – 3:09
4. "Now That You Got It" (video) - 3:09
- US iTunes remix single
1. "Now That You Got It" (Hybrid Mix featuring Damian "Jr Gong" Marley) – 3:08 (single version)
2. "Now That You Got It" (Main Mix featuring Damian "Jr Gong" Marley) – 3:26 (remix)
- US 12-inch single

A1. "Now That You Got It" (single version featuring Damian "Jr Gong" Marley) – 3:09
A2. "Now That You Got It" (album version) – 3:00
A3. "Now That You Got It" (instrumental version) – 2:55
B1. "Now That You Got It" (remix featuring Damian "Jr Gong" Marley) – 3:26
B2. "Now That You Got It" (dub) – 3:30

== Personnel ==
Personnel are adapted from the liner notes of The Sweet Escape.

- Gwen Stefani – lead vocals, songwriting
- Angel Aponte – additional recording
- Pete Davis – additional keyboards, additional mix programming
- Loren Dawson – keyboards
- Alex Dromgoole – assistant engineering
- David Emery – assistant engineering
- Brian "Big Bass" Gardner – mastering
- Sean Garrett – backing vocals, co-production, songwriting
- Kevin Mills – recording
- Glenn Pittman – assistant engineering
- Mark "Spike" Stent – mixing
- Swizz Beatz – production, songwriting
- Steve Tolle – assistant engineering

== Charts ==
=== Weekly charts ===
Weekly chart performance for "Now That You Got It"
Chart (2007)	Peak position
Australia (ARIA)	37
Australian Urban (ARIA)	9
Austria (Ö3 Austria Top 40)	60
CIS Airplay (TopHit) Damian Marley remix	155
Germany (GfK)	73
Hungary (Rádiós Top 40)	36
Italy (FIMI)	26
New Zealand (Recorded Music NZ)	21
Norway (VG-lista)	17
Russia Airplay (TopHit) Damian Marley remix	149
Slovakia Airplay (ČNS IFPI)	30
UK Singles (Official Charts)	59
Ukraine Airplay (TopHit) Damian Marley remix	101
US Dance Singles Sales (Billboard)	13

=== Year-end charts ===
Year-end chart performance for "Now That You Got It"
Chart (2007)	Position
Australian Urban (ARIA)	44

== Release history ==
Release dates and formats for "Now That You Got It"
Region	Date	Format	Label	Ref.
United States	August 26, 2007	Contemporary hit radio	Interscope	
United States	September 14, 2007	Digital download (Remixes)	Interscope	
United Kingdom	September 24, 2007	Digital download (International Hybrid Version)	Polydor	
United Kingdom	October 15, 2007	Digital download (International Version)	Polydor	
