= The Sweet Escape (song) =

2006 single by Gwen Stefani featuring Akon

Single by Gwen Stefani featuring Akon

from the album The Sweet Escape
- Released: December 19, 2006
- Recorded: 2006
- Studio: Right Track Recording (New York City); Doppler (Atlanta); Henson Recording (Hollywood)
- Genre: Dance; doo-wop
- Length: 4:06
- Label: Interscope
- Songwriters: Gwen Stefani; Aliaune Thiam; Giorgio Tuinfort
- Producers: Aliaune "Akon" Thiam; Giorgio Tuinfort

Gwen Stefani singles chronology
"Wind It Up" (2006)	"The Sweet Escape" (2006)	"4 in the Morning" (2007)

Akon singles chronology
"I Wanna Love You" (2006)	"The Sweet Escape" (2006)	"Don't Matter" (2007)

Music video
- "The Sweet Escape" on YouTube

"The Sweet Escape" is a song by American singer Gwen Stefani from her 2006 second solo studio album of the same name. It was written by Stefani, Aliaune "Akon" Thiam and Giorgio Tuinfort, and produced by the latter two. Akon, who is also a featured artist, developed the song's beat before collaborating with Stefani. He designed it based on her previous work with No Doubt, and Stefani later commented that it put her "on the yellow brick road to the No Doubt record I might do". "The Sweet Escape" is an apology for a fight between two lovers and describes a dream of a pleasant life for them. As the album's title track, its title was chosen to help market Stefani's music and fashion lines.

Interscope Records released "The Sweet Escape" on December 19, 2006, as the album's second single and was commercially successful in mainstream and adult contemporary markets. It reached the top 10 of most charts and topped the New Zealand Singles Chart. "The Sweet Escape" was also well-received by music critics, who praised its composition but criticized Akon's appearance. It was nominated for Best Pop Collaboration with Vocals at the 50th Annual Grammy Awards. The accompanying music video for "The Sweet Escape" was directed by Joseph Kahn and shows Stefani attempting to escape from a golden prison.

== Background and writing ==
Interscope Records' CEO Jimmy Iovine, who helped with A&R for The Sweet Escape, arranged the collaboration between Stefani and Akon. Interscope sent Stefani a copy of Akon's 2004 debut album Trouble and repeatedly encouraged her to work with him. Akon readily accepted, and Stefani accepted after several people had pushed her to work with him.

When Akon was asked to work with Stefani, he reviewed her work, ranging from her music with No Doubt to her solo career. He noted that the sound Stefani had cultivated with No Doubt was missing from her solo work. Iovine called Stefani, telling her, "You can cancel everything else in your life, but don't cancel this session." She decided to work with Akon and expected that they would work on writing a generic hip hop song, one that would not fit her well.

When they met, Akon played some of his tracks for her. They thought about words that would suit the marketing of Stefani's music and her clothing lines L.A.M.B. and Harajuku Lovers, settling on "Sweet Escape". Akon played her the beat he had developed, and they began working on the song. They came up with a doo-wop song rather than the hip hop sound Stefani had expected.

== Music and lyrics ==
"The Sweet Escape"

"The Sweet Escape" is a dance and doo-wop song composed in the key of B♭ minor. It is written in compound quadruple meter, commonly used in doo-wop, and has a moderate tempo of 120 beats per minute. Stefani's vocal range covers nearly two octaves, from G_{3} to F_{5}.

The song uses two-measure phrases that, aside from the choruses, use a i–III–IV–VI chord progression. The B♭ minor chord is held for 1 1/3 of a beat, and a relative transformation is then used to produce a second-inversion D♭ major chord, which is held for 1 2/3 of a beat. In the second measure, a first-inversion E♭ major chord with an added ninth precedes a G♭ major major seventh chord; the chords are held for the same durations as the previous two.

The song opens with an introduction which consists of eight measures of instrumentals, followed by eight measures in which Akon sings "Woohoo, yeehoo". The introduction has been claimed to be similar to that in the 1986 song "Sweet Sweet Gwendoline" by German band Die Ärzte. Overdubbing is introduced in the middle of the first verse to produce a sequence of eighth note B♭ minor chords from Stefani's vocals. Stefani's voice is overdubbed again when she sings the chorus twice. Akon performs, and Stefani then sings the second verse and the choruses again. She returns to the latter part of the first verse and repeats the choruses. The song closes as Akon repeats the lines "Woohoo, yeehoo" and "I wanna get away to our sweet escape" as the song fades.

The song's lyrics discuss an argument between spouses. Stefani apologizes "for acting stank" to her lover. She asks her lover for forgiveness and describes wanting to be a better wife. Although Stefani acknowledges her misdeeds, she nonetheless pushes off some of the blame in a manner that drew comparisons to Monica's 1995 single "Don't Take It Personal (Just One of Dem Days)" and TLC's 1999 single "I'm Good at Being Bad". In contrast to her songwriting on No Doubt's Tragic Kingdom (1995), Stefani intimates a desire for a pleasant domestic life, most extensively during the chorus.

== Critical reception ==
"The Sweet Escape" received generally positive reviews from contemporary pop music critics. In a review for AllMusic, Stephen Thomas Erlewine described the song as "an irresistible ... track, driven by a giddy 'wee-ooh!' hook and supported by a nearly anthemic summertime chorus". John Murphy of musicOMH referred to "The Sweet Escape" as "a lovely, summery bouncy pop song with a very infectious chorus". Murphy compared the song to Weezer's 2002 single "Keep Fishin'", and Blender's Ben Sisario compared it to the work of the Beach Boys. Alex Miller from NME compared the song to Madonna's early work but added that it sounded "cringey and saccharine". Anna Britten from Yahoo! Music commented that it sounded like music from 1970, specifically that of soul group Chairmen of the Board. Bill Lamb of About.com called the song "a welcome change from the over-produced 'Wind It Up'", but noted that it "easily jets in one ear and out the other leaving little trace of its presence". MuchMusic's video review program Video on Trial referred to the song as "incredibly intoxicating".

Akon's presence as a featured artist on the track received negative reviews. Quentin B. Huff of PopMatters found that Akon contributed too few vocals to the song and that they were wasted. Rolling Stone reviewer Rob Sheffield agreed, viewing the song as a fumbled attempt to capitalize on the success of Akon's "Smack That" featuring Eminem. The Observer's Paul Flynn was displeased with his presence in lieu of higher profile hip hop artists such as Dr. Dre and André 3000 on Stefani's previous album Love. Angel. Music. Baby. (2004). He added that the song sounded like a "weirdly flat" version of Madonna's 1986 single "True Blue". Charles Merwin of Stylus Magazine described his vocals as "yelping".

== Commercial performance ==
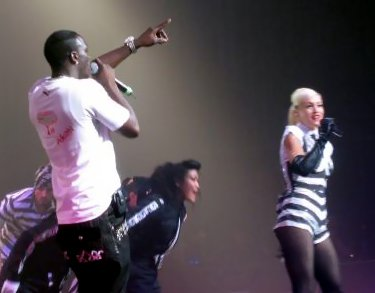
Akon and Stefani performing "The Sweet Escape" on The Sweet Escape Tour

In the United States, "The Sweet Escape" debuted at number 93 on the Billboard Hot 100 on the issue dated December 30, 2006. Following Stefani and Akon's performance of the song on American Idol in late March 2007, it peaked at number two on the chart dated April 14 behind Akon's subsequent single "Don't Matter", selling 140,200 downloads during that week. The song spent 15 consecutive weeks in the top 10 and remained on the chart for over nine months, listed at number three on the Billboard Hot 100 year-end chart. The single was successful in mainstream music, topping the Pop 100 and Pop 100 Airplay charts and reaching number two on the Mainstream Top 40 chart. It had strong airplay on adult contemporary stations and reached the top five of the Hot Adult Contemporary Tracks and Hot Adult Top 40 Tracks charts. The song was nominated for Best Pop Collaboration with Vocals at the 2008 Grammy Awards, but lost to Robert Plant and Alison Krauss' "Gone Gone Gone (Done Moved On)". At over 2.1 million downloads, "The Sweet Escape" was the third best-selling digital track of 2007, and Nielsen Broadcast Data Systems listed it as the fifth most played song of the year.

In Canada, "The Sweet Escape" reached number one on the Canadian Digital Song Sales chart, becoming Stefani's second and latest number-one hit in the country and her second number one from The Sweet Escape, following "Wind It Up". Despite the fact that "The Sweet Escape" had already peaked in popularity by the time that the Canadian Hot 100 began publication on March 31, 2007, the song experienced similar success on that chart. It reached number two on unpublished versions of the Canadian Hot 100, and debuted at number 14 when the chart was introduced during the week of June 2, 2007, the 10th week that "The Sweet Escape" had been listed. The song remained on the Canadian Hot 100 for over six months after the chart was officially introduced.

"The Sweet Escape" was similarly successful in Europe, topping the Billboard European Hot 100 Singles chart for three weeks in March 2007. In the United Kingdom, the song entered the UK Singles Chart at number three, selling 30,000 copies in its first week. The following week, the track peaked at number two, giving Stefani her highest-charting solo single in the UK. It spent a second consecutive week at number two, selling 23,500 copies. The single was successful across continental Europe as well, reaching the top five in France, Hungary, Norway, the Netherlands, and Romania, and the top 10 in Austria, Belgium, the Czech Republic, Finland, Germany, and Switzerland.

The song debuted at number two on Australia's ARIA Singles Chart and remained there for six weeks. The Australian Recording Industry Association (ARIA) certified "The Sweet Escape" double platinum for shipping 140,000 copies. In New Zealand, the single debuted atop the chart and was certified gold by the Recording Industry Association of New Zealand (RIANZ).

== Music video ==
The music video premiered on January 10, 2007, on LAUNCHcast. The video opens with scenes of Stefani and the Harajuku Girls in a golden jail. After obtaining the key from a dog, they escape. Stefani is then shown in a penthouse two hours later. She lets down two long braids, allowing the Harajuku Girls to scale the building and cut off the braids. They meet Akon at a convenience store parking lot, and Stefani drives off with him. They are pursued by two of the Harajuku Girls as police officers, and the video closes with Stefani back in jail after two hours of chasing. The video is intercut with sequences of Stefani and Akon in front of a letter G in lights.

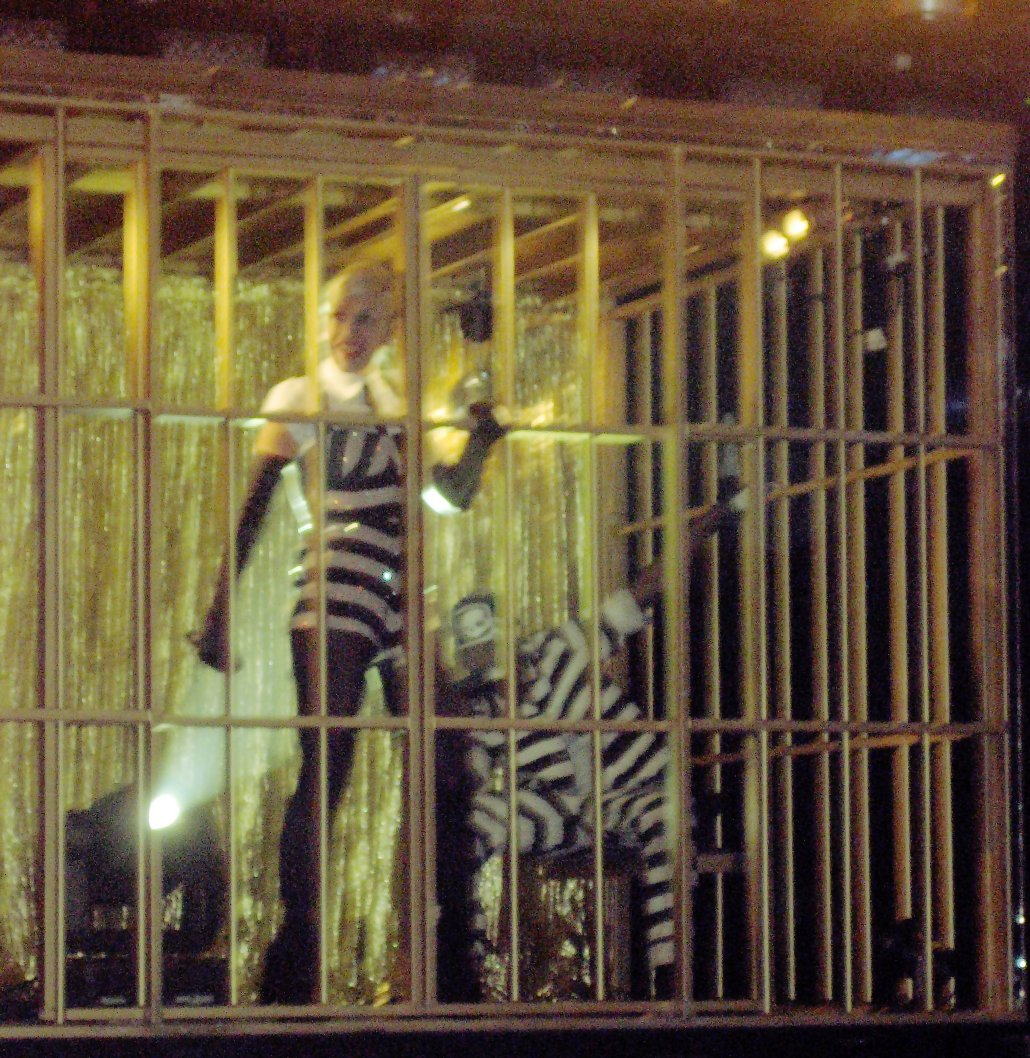
Stefani performing "The Sweet Escape" inside a gold cage on The Sweet Escape Tour

The video was filmed in December 2006, several days before Christmas. It was directed by Joseph Kahn and produced by Maryann Tenado of H.S.I. Productions. The jail and penthouse scenes in the video are symbolic of "being jailed by love". Stefani being unable to escape her metaphoric prisons represents how one cannot escape from oneself. The penthouse scene is an allusion to the 19th-century fairy tale "Rapunzel". The video features product placement for two General Motors vehicles, the Chevrolet Tahoe, and the Buick Lucerne.

"The Sweet Escape" premiered on MTV's top-10 video chart program Total Request Live at number seven January 16, 2007, and it peaked at number two the next month. The video was nominated for Most Earthshattering Collaboration, one of four categories created for the reinvented 2007 MTV Video Music Awards but lost to Beyoncé and Shakira's "Beautiful Liar". After its January 20 debut on MuchMusic's Countdown, it reached number one for two weeks in March 2007. In December 2007, MTV International introduced a certification system to recognize music videos that were successful on stations outside the US.

Plays were totaled from February through June 2007, and with 11,000 plays, "The Sweet Escape" was the most successful video, receiving a platinum award.

== Live performances ==
"The Sweet Escape" was featured on Stefani's The Sweet Escape Tour. She also performed the song with Akon at the 2007 Kids' Choice Awards, American Idol, and The Ellen DeGeneres Show.

== In popular culture ==
The song and video were parodied on the February 17, 2007, episode of Mad TV as "Aren't Asians Great?". The video features Nicole Parker as Stefani and discusses the singer's love of Asian culture as well as Asian contributions to the world.

The song was also featured in the November 13, 2017, episode of Supergirl called "Midvale". The song is played in a scene where the characters Alex and Kara Danvers go on a road trip.

In 2026, it appeared in the film Disclosure Day, where the character Margaret Fairchild, portrayed by Emily Blunt, sings it while driving to work before being pulled over by the police.

== Track listings ==
- UK and European 2-track CD single
1. "The Sweet Escape" (featuring Akon) – 4:06
2. "Hollaback Girl" (Harajuku Lovers Live Version) – 4:49
- Australian and European CD maxi single
1. "The Sweet Escape" (featuring Akon) – 4:06
2. "Hollaback Girl" (Harajuku Lovers Live Version) – 4:49
3. "Wind It Up" (Robots to Mars Remix) – 3:34
4. "The Sweet Escape" (video) – 4:05
- US 12-inch single

A1. "The Sweet Escape" (Konvict Remix) (featuring Akon) – 4:03
A2. "The Sweet Escape" (Album Version) (featuring Akon) – 4:06
B1. "The Sweet Escape" (Konvict Instrumental) – 4:03
B2. "The Sweet Escape" (Album Version Instrumental) – 4:06
B3. "The Sweet Escape" (Album Version Acappella) – 3:51

- Digital download – Konvict Remix
1. "The Sweet Escape" (Konvict Remix) (featuring Akon) – 4:01

== Credits and personnel ==
Credits adapted from the liner notes of The Sweet Escape.

- Gwen Stefani – lead vocals, songwriting
- Akon – keyboards, production, programming, songwriting, vocals
- Yvan Bing – assistant engineering
- Alex Dromgoole – assistant engineering
- Bojan Dugic – recording
- David Emery – assistant engineering
- Brian "Big Bass" Gardner – mastering
- Mark "Exit" Goodchild – recording
- Keith Gretlein – recording
- Tony Love – guitar
- Kevin Mills – recording
- Mark "Spike" Stent – mixing
- Giorgio Tuinfort – co-production, keyboards, programming, songwriting

== Charts ==
=== Weekly charts ===
Weekly chart performance for "The Sweet Escape"
Chart (2007)	Peak position
Australia (ARIA)	2
Australian Urban (ARIA)	1
Austria (Ö3 Austria Top 40)	6
Belgium (Ultratop 50 Flanders)	9
Belgium (Ultratop 50 Wallonia)	3
Canada Digital Song Sales (Billboard)	1
Canada Hot 100 (Billboard)	2 (Note: "The Sweet Escape" had already peaked in popularity when the first issue of the Canadian Hot 100 was released on March 31, 2007.)
Canada AC (Billboard)	3
Canada CHR/Top 40 (Billboard)	1
Canada Hot AC (Billboard)	2
CIS Airplay (TopHit)	12
Czech Republic Airplay (ČNS IFPI)	9
Denmark (Tracklisten)	7
Europe (European Hot 100 Singles)	1
Finland (Suomen virallinen lista)	8
France (SNEP)	4
Germany (GfK)	6
Global Dance Tracks (Billboard)	12
Greece (IFPI Greece)	25
Hungary (Rádiós Top 40)	3
Hungary (Dance Top 40)	20
Ireland (IRMA)	4
Italy (FIMI)	14
Netherlands (Dutch Top 40)	5
Netherlands (Single Top 100)	8
New Zealand (Recorded Music NZ)	1
Norway (VG-lista)	2
Romania (Romanian Top 100)	3
Russia Airplay (TopHit)	11
Scottish Singles Sales (Official Charts)	4
Slovakia Airplay (ČNS IFPI)	12
Sweden (Sverigetopplistan)	13
Switzerland (Schweizer Hitparade)	10
UK Singles (Official Charts)	2
UK Hip Hop/R&B (Official Charts)	1
US Billboard Hot 100	2
US Adult Contemporary (Billboard)	3
US Adult Pop Airplay (Billboard)	2
US Latin Pop Airplay (Billboard)	36
US Pop Airplay (Billboard)	2
US Pop 100 (Billboard)	1
US Rhythmic Airplay (Billboard)	28
Venezuela Pop Rock (Record Report)	3

=== Year-end charts ===
Year-end chart performance for "The Sweet Escape"
Chart (2007)	Position
Australia (ARIA)	9
Australian Urban (ARIA)	7
Austria (Ö3 Austria Top 40)	26
Belgium (Ultratop 50 Flanders)	51
Belgium (Ultratop 50 Wallonia)	19
Brazil (Crowley)	37
CIS (TopHit)	77
Europe (European Hot 100 Singles)	9
France (SNEP)	40
Germany (Media Control GfK)	33
Hungary (Rádiós Top 40)	20
Netherlands (Dutch Top 40)	13
Netherlands (Single Top 100)	34
New Zealand (RIANZ)	8
Romania (Romanian Top 100)	26
Russia Airplay (TopHit)	108
Sweden (Sverigetopplistan)	47
Switzerland (Schweizer Hitparade)	31
UK Singles (OCC)	13
UK Urban (Music Week)	19
US Billboard Hot 100	3
US Adult Contemporary (Billboard)	6
US Adult Top 40 (Billboard)	7
US Pop 100 (Billboard)	2

== Certifications and sales ==
Certifications and sales for "The Sweet Escape"
Region	Certification	Certified units/sales
Australia (ARIA)	2× Platinum	140,000^{^}
Belgium (BRMA)	Gold	25,000^{*}
Brazil (Pro-Música Brasil)	Platinum	60,000^{‡}
Canada	—	71,000
Denmark (IFPI Danmark)	Platinum	90,000^{‡}
Germany (BVMI)	Platinum	300,000^{‡}
Italy (FIMI)	Gold	25,000^{‡}
New Zealand (RMNZ)	5× Platinum	150,000^{‡}
Norway (IFPI Norway)	Gold	5,000^{*}
Sweden (GLF)	Gold	10,000^{^}
United Kingdom (BPI)	3× Platinum	1,800,000^{‡}
United States (RIAA)	5× Platinum	5,000,000^{‡}
^{*} Sales figures based on certification alone.^{^} Shipments figures based on certification alone.^{‡} Sales+streaming figures based on certification alone.

== Release history ==
Release dates and formats for "The Sweet Escape"
Region	Date	Format(s)	Label	Ref.
United States	December 19, 2006	Contemporary hit radio	Interscope	
Australia	February 17, 2007	CD maxi single; digital download	Universal	
United States	February 20, 2007	Digital download – Konvict Remix	Interscope	
Germany	February 23, 2007	CD single; CD maxi single; digital download	Universal	
United Kingdom	February 26, 2007	CD single; digital download	Polydor	
United States	February 27, 2007	12" single	Interscope	
United Kingdom	March 12, 2007	Digital download – Konvict Remix	Polydor	

== See also ==
- List of European number-one hits of 2007
- List of number-one singles from the 2000s (New Zealand)
- List of number-one urban singles of 2007 (Australia)
- List of UK R&B Chart number-one singles of 2007
