= Cool (Gwen Stefani song) =

2005 single by Gwen Stefani

Single by Gwen Stefani

from the album Love. Angel. Music. Baby.
- Released: July 5, 2005
- Studio: DARP (Atlanta, Georgia); O'Henry Sound (Burbank, California)
- Genre: Synth-pop; new wave
- Length: 3:09
- Label: Interscope
- Songwriters: Gwen Stefani; Dallas Austin
- Producer: Dallas Austin

Gwen Stefani singles chronology
"Hollaback Girl" (2005)	"Cool" (2005)	"Can I Have It Like That" (2005)

Music video
- "Cool" on YouTube

"Cool" is a song by American singer Gwen Stefani from her debut solo studio album, Love. Angel. Music. Baby. (2004). Written by Stefani and Dallas Austin, the song was released as the fourth single from the album on July 5, 2005. The song's musical style and production were inspired by synth-pop and new wave arrangements from the 1980s, and its lyrics chronicle a relationship in which two lovers have separated, but remain "cool" with each other as good friends.

"Cool" received generally positive reviews from music critics, being compared to Cyndi Lauper and Madonna songs from the 1980s. The media have drawn parallels between the song's lyrical content and the romantic relationship that Stefani had with Tony Kanal, a fellow band member of No Doubt. "Cool" was moderately successful on the charts around the world, peaking within the top 10 in Australia, the Netherlands, the Czech Republic and New Zealand, as well as the top 20 in Denmark, Ireland, Norway, the United Kingdom and the United States.

The accompanying music video for "Cool" was directed by Sophie Muller and filmed in Lake Como, Italy. The video features many flashbacks to when Stefani and her former boyfriend were dating. It is implied that whilst Gwen accepts the new relationship her ex-partner is in, she looks back with nostalgia and regret. "Cool" was included on the setlist for Stefani's debut solo tour Harajuku Lovers Tour and its accompanying video album, as well as in the 2006 comedies Last Holiday and Click and the 2010 drama Somewhere.

== Background ==
After listening to No Doubt's 2002 single "Underneath It All", Austin commented that he was trying to write his version of No Doubt's 2000 single "Simple Kind of Life", but he was unable to finish the song. He originally wrote the song for Christina Aguilera and TLC. However, Austin felt reluctant to give the song to TLC after breaking up with group member Chilli and wrote "Damaged" for them instead. He asked Stefani to help with the lyrics. During a studio session together, they finished "Cool" in 15 minutes. Stefani commented, "When he told me about the track and where it came from for him, it just triggered something in me." The lyrics of "Cool" reflect Stefani's previous relationship with No Doubt bassist Tony Kanal, and is considered somewhat of a follow-up to No Doubt's 1996 single "Don't Speak". The earlier song is about the heartbreak of the couple's seven-year relationship ending, while "Cool" presents an amicable friendship between the pair, and explains that after the years that have passed and everything they have been through, they have reached a place where they are comfortable with each other and that they still remain very good friends. Stefani said that she had never intended to include personal material on Love. Angel. Music. Baby., and commented, "but no matter what you do, things just come out. It just ended this whole thing for me in my head and it puts an end to a chapter in a really nice way."

== Composition ==
"Cool"
A 19-second sample from "Cool" which plays the bridge, where Stefani sings about how her relationship with her ex-boyfriend finished well.

"Cool" is a mid-tempo love song featuring a synth-pop and new wave production. The song is composed in D major. It is written in common time, it moves at a moderate tempo of 112 beats per minute, and it has a vocal range from the low note of F♯_{3} to the high note of C♯_{5}. The song is written in the common verse-chorus form, featuring five instruments: bass guitar, drums, guitar, keyboards and synthesizer. "Cool" opens with all five instruments, and as Stefani begins singing, the synthesizer is lowered, and the hard-hitting drum beat steadily increases in volume. She performs her highest pitch (C♯_{5}) during the chorus, after which she sings in a softer, almost sotto voce, and her lowest pitch (E_{3}) at the beginning of the verses. The synthesizer emulates brass and woodwind instruments, while the bass and guitar retain a prominent and regular eighth note pulse, using a I–IV–V chord progression for the verses. In the percussion section a drum kit is used and the snare is introduced at the beginning of the first chorus, which maintains its beat. During the song's fade-out, Stefani repeats "I know we're cool" and "yeah", and she occasionally emphasizes "cool". Her vocal range covers close to two octaves.

== Critical reception ==
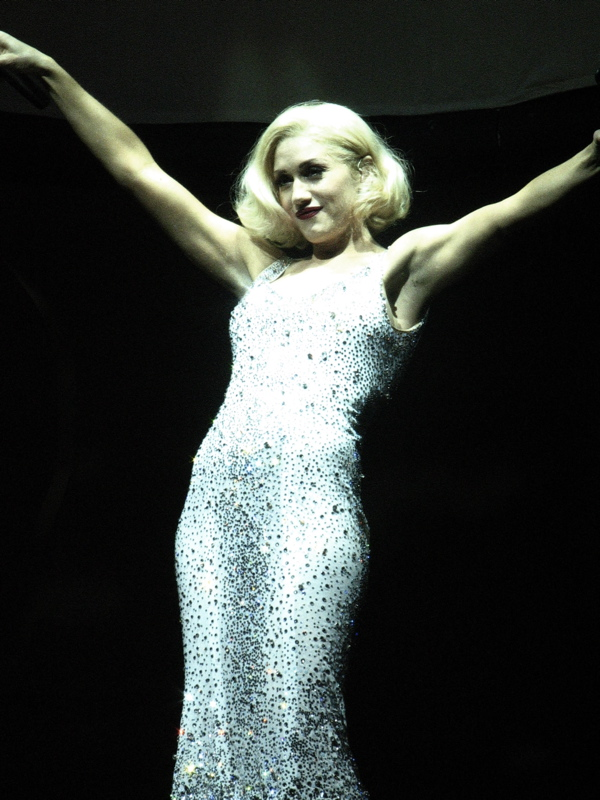
Stefani performing "Cool" on the Harajuku Lovers Tour

"Cool" received generally positive reviews from music critics. Jennifer Nine from Yahoo! Music referred to the song as "a liltingly sweet paean to post-break-up friendships", while Stephen Thomas Erlewine from AllMusic called it a "high school anthem-in-waiting" theme; it also was selected as one of the album's highlights. Richard Smirke from Playlouder commented that the song successfully used the same production formula as fellow album tracks "Serious" and "What You Waiting For?", and described it as a "crisp blend of edgy 21C production and early 80s Madonna-esque pop". Jason Damas, in a review for PopMatters, characterized it as "a slippery slice of keyboard" New Wave song referring to it as a "pitched halfway between The Go-Go's and Cyndi Lauper".

Eric Greenwood from Drawer B called "Cool" "a retrofitted [song] with stale synths and chugging guitars" with "dorkier lyrics than even Cyndi Lauper would dare". Sandy Cohen from the Toronto Star called it "the year's love anthem". Entertainment Weekly reviewer David Browne described Stefani in "Cool", and in another song from the album ("The Real Thing"), as "a glacial '80s synthpop zombie". Krissi Murison from NME found Stefani's performance reminiscent of "Madonna's breathless purr". John Murphy wrote for musicOMH that "Cool" would remind No Doubt fans of "Don't Speak". Blender editors ranked "Cool" at number 45 on its list of "The 100 Greatest Songs of 2005".

== Chart performance ==
In the United States, "Cool" debuted at number 86 on the Billboard Hot 100 on the issue dated July 16, 2005. The next week it rose to number 64, and it reached its peak position of number 13 on September 3, 2005. On other Billboard charts, the single topped the Dance Club Songs chart, reached number four on the Adult Top 40 chart and number nine on the Pop 100 chart. In Australia, "Cool" debuted and peaked at number ten on September 11, 2005, dropping off the chart on November 13, 2005, at number 49. In New Zealand, "Cool" became the second-highest debut of the week ending September 5, 2005, at number 11. It rose to its peak position of number nine the following week, becoming her fifth consecutive top-ten in the country.

In European countries "Cool" performed moderately, reaching the top 40 in most of them. In the Czech Republic, "Cool" entered the Rádio – Top 100 chart at number 12, achieving its peak position of number ten in its tenth week. In Italy, it debuted at number 16 on September 22, 2005, peaking at number 15 the week after. In Norway, "Cool" debuted at number 18 on the VG-lista chart, climbing to number 16 the following week. In Ireland, "Cool" debuted and peaked at number 12 on the Irish Singles Chart during the week ending September 1, 2005. In the United Kingdom, "Cool" debuted and peaked at number 11 on the UK Singles Chart for the week of September 4, 2005, spending 10 weeks on the chart. In Austria, "Cool" debuted at number 31 on September 11, 2005. Four weeks later, the single reached its peak position of number 15 and was last seen on December 16, 2005, after 15 weeks.

== Music video ==
The music video includes match cut flashbacks to Stefani's previous relationship.

The accompanying music video for "Cool" was directed by longtime collaborator Sophie Muller and filmed in Lake Como, Italy in June 2005. "It was obvious I was gonna ask her to do it", Stefani stated in an interview with VH1's Box Set. The video follows the song's theme and depicts the relationship that Stefani has with a former boyfriend, who is played by Spanish actor Daniel González. González and his new girlfriend, played by Tony Kanal's then-girlfriend and now-wife, Erin Lokitz, are shown walking up to a villa where Stefani answers the door. The villa featured in the video is the Villa Erba in the town of Cernobbio, which Stefani said was "so beautiful". The three of them are seen in each other's company, with intercut scenes of Stefani singing on a bed. There are flashbacks to the time when Stefani and her former boyfriend were dating, where she has brunette hair. Flashbacks and present day images are linked with match cut cinematography. The lyrical theme of "Cool" is maintained in the video; frames are incorporated to portray Stefani feeling "cool". She is depicted as "cool" with her former boyfriend and his girlfriend throughout most of the video.

The video for "Cool" premiered on MTV's top-ten chart program Total Request Live on June 30, 2005, where it reached number three. After its July 8, 2005, debut on MuchMusic's Countdown, it reached number one for the week of October 8, 2005.

== Formats and track listings ==
- European 2-track CD single; digital single
1. "Cool" (album version) – 3:09
2. "Cool" (Photek remix) – 5:49
- Australian and European CD maxi-single
1. "Cool" (album version) – 3:09
2. "Cool" (Photek remix) – 5:49
3. "Hollaback Girl" (Dancehollaback remix by Tony Kanal featuring Elan) – 6:53
4. "Cool" (video) – 4:06
- US 12-inch vinyl

A1. "Cool" (Richard X remix) – 6:37
A2. "Cool" (Richard X dub mix) – 7:10
B1. "Cool" (Photek DJ mix) – 6:34
B2. "Cool" (Photek remix) – 5:49

== Personnel ==
Personnel are adapted from the liner notes of Love. Angel. Music. Baby.

- Gwen Stefani – lead vocals, songwriting
- Dallas Austin – drums, keyboards, production, songwriting
- Greg Collins – recording
- Brian "Big Bass" Gardner – mastering
- Caesar Guevara – assistant engineering
- Rob Haggett – second assistant engineer
- Doug Harms – assistant engineering
- Nellee Hooper – additional production
- Tony Kanal – synthesizer
- Jason Lader – programming
- Kevin Mills – assistant engineering
- Tony Reyes – bass guitar, Line 6 guitar
- Paul Sheehy – assistant engineering
- Rick Sheppard – MIDI, recording, sound design
- Mark "Spike" Stent – mixing
- David Treahearn – assistant engineering

== Charts ==
=== Weekly charts ===
Weekly chart performance for "Cool"
Chart (2005–2006)	Peak position
Australia (ARIA)	10
Austria (Ö3 Austria Top 40)	15
Belgium (Ultratop 50 Flanders)	36
Belgium (Ultratip Bubbling Under Wallonia)	2
Canada CHR/Pop Top 30 (Radio & Records)	5
Canada Hot AC Top 30 (Radio & Records)	1
CIS Airplay (TopHit)	4
Czech Republic (Rádio Top 100)	10
Denmark (Tracklisten)	14
Finland (Suomen virallinen lista)	18
France (SNEP)	32
Germany (GfK)	20
Greece (IFPI)	24
Hungary (Rádiós Top 40)	12
Hungary (Dance Top 40)	28
Ireland (IRMA)	12
Italy (FIMI)	15
Netherlands (Dutch Top 40)	6
Netherlands (Single Top 100)	25
New Zealand (Recorded Music NZ)	9
Norway (VG-lista)	16
Romania (Romanian Top 100)	9
Russia Airplay (TopHit)	4
Scottish Singles Sales (Official Charts)	11
Switzerland (Schweizer Hitparade)	24
UK Singles (Official Charts)	11
Ukraine Airplay (TopHit)	200
US Billboard Hot 100	13
US Adult Contemporary (Billboard)	23
US Adult Pop Airplay (Billboard)	4
US Dance Club Songs (Billboard)	1
US Dance Airplay (Billboard)	8
US Pop Airplay (Billboard)	10
US Pop 100 (Billboard)	9

=== Year-end charts ===
2005 year-end chart performance for "Cool"
Chart (2005)	Position
CIS Airplay (TopHit)	30
Hungary (Rádiós Top 40)	68
Netherlands (Dutch Top 40)	73
Romania (Romanian Top 100)	80
Russia Airplay (TopHit)	22
UK Singles (OCC)	124
US Billboard Hot 100	76
US Adult Top 40 (Billboard)	22
US Mainstream Top 40 (Billboard)	49
US Pop 100 (Billboard)	57

2006 year-end chart performance for "Cool"
Chart (2006)	Position
CIS Airplay (TopHit)	198
Russia Airplay (TopHit)	188

=== Decade-end charts ===
Decade-end chart performance for "Cool"
Chart (2000–2009)	Position
Russia Airplay (TopHit)	185

== Certifications ==
Certifications and sales for "Cool"
Region	Certification	Certified units/sales
New Zealand (RMNZ)	Gold	15,000^{‡}
United Kingdom (BPI)	Silver	200,000^{‡}
United States (RIAA)	Platinum	1,000,000^{‡}
^{‡} Sales+streaming figures based on certification alone.

== Release history ==
Release dates and formats for "Cool"
Region	Date	Format(s)	Label	Ref(s).
United States	July 5, 2005	Contemporary hit radio	Interscope	
Australia	August 29, 2005	CD single	Interscope	
France	August 29, 2005	CD maxi-single	Interscope	
United Kingdom	August 29, 2005	CD maxi-single	Interscope	
United States	September 13, 2005	12-inch single	Interscope	
Germany	September 19, 2005	CD single; CD maxi-single	Interscope	
