= Harajuku Lovers Live =

Video by Gwen Stefani
- Released: December 4, 2006
- Recorded: November 2005; Honda Center (Anaheim, California)
- Genres: Electronic; pop rock
- Length: 83:40 (Concert); 25:12 (Bonus content)
- Label: Interscope
- Director: Sophie Muller
- Producer: An Oil Factory Production

Harajuku Lovers Live is the first live long-form video by American recording artist Gwen Stefani. It was released on DVD on December 4, 2006, by Interscope Records. The DVD was directed by Sophie Muller and produced by Oil Factory Productions. It is a recording of one of Stefani's concerts during her Harajuku Lovers Tour 2005 in late 2005 to promote her first album, Love. Angel. Music. Baby., released in November 2004. The performance was recorded in November 2005, in Anaheim, California. The concert features performances of all twelve songs from Love. Angel. Music. Baby. and two new songs from her second studio album, The Sweet Escape, as well as interviews with the musicians and dancers and a documentary of tour preparation.

Harajuku Lovers Live was released in conjunction with the promotion for The Sweet Escape, which was also released on December 5, 2006. The DVD received mixed reviews, with reviewers praising Stefani's musical performances and stage presence, but criticizing the lack of material and the long costume changes. The DVD was certified gold in Australia by the Australian Recording Industry Association and platinum in Canada by the Canadian Recording Industry Association.

== Background ==
During her hiatus from the band No Doubt, Gwen Stefani recorded and released her first solo studio album, Love. Angel. Music. Baby. on November 23, 2004. Between September 2004 and January 2006, Stefani released six of the album's twelve tracks as singles: "What You Waiting For?", "Rich Girl", "Hollaback Girl", "Cool", "Luxurious" and "Crash". The album was a commercial success, selling seven million copies worldwide; it was certified triple platinum by the Recording Industry Association of America, triple platinum by the British Phonographic Industry, five times platinum by the Canadian Recording Industry Association and four times platinum by the Australian Recording Industry Association. The International Federation of the Phonographic Industry certified Love. Angel. Music. Baby. platinum at the May 2005 Platinum Europe Awards.

Between October and December 2005, Stefani toured North America in her Harajuku Lovers Tour 2005 to promote Love. Angel. Music. Baby., performing 37 shows in the United States and five in Canada. Her opening acts included Ciara, M.I.A. and The Black Eyed Peas. Her performances received mixed reviews from critics, with criticism about her lack of musical material, frequent costume changes and perceived inability to dance, but praise for her stage presence and elaborate costumes. Stefani finished the recording of her second album, The Sweet Escape, in late 2006, having recorded some of the material in 2005, suspended the project due to pregnancy, and resumed recording in summer 2006.

== Content and release ==
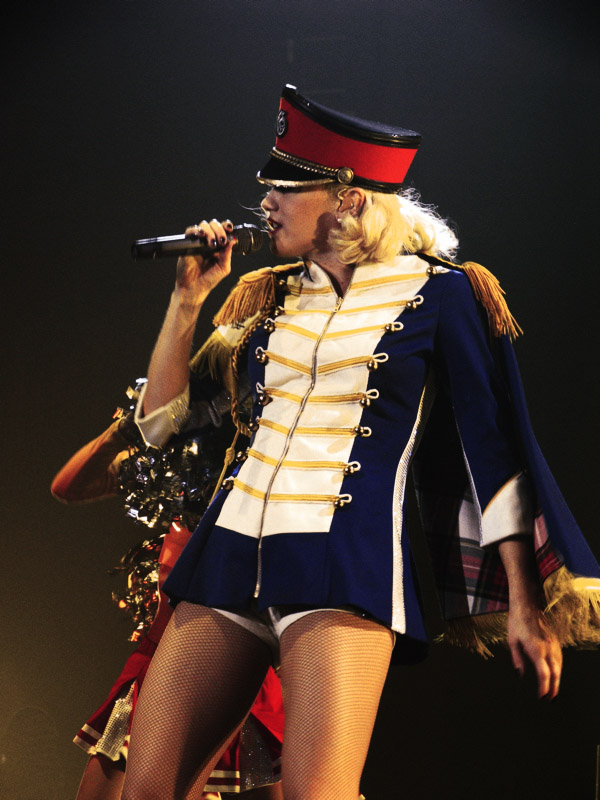
Stefani on the Harajuku Lovers Tour, performing "Hollaback Girl", the most successful single from her first album.

Harajuku Lovers Live was released on December 5, 2006, the same day as the release of Stefani's second album, The Sweet Escape. Both Harajuku Lovers Live and The Sweet Escape were released a day early in the United Kingdom, on December 4, 2006. The DVD carries a Parental Advisory sticker for profanity, although a clean version of the DVD is also available. The cover image of Stefani sitting in a throne imitates the cover image of Love. Angel. Music. Baby.; both images were photographed by Nick Knight. It was directed by Sophie Muller, who has also produced music videos for Stefani's singles "Cool", "Luxurious" and "Crash" from Love. Angel. Music. Baby. and would later produce music videos for "Wind It Up", "4 in the Morning" and "Early Winter" from The Sweet Escape. The DVD was produced by Oil Factory Productions.

The DVD contains an edited recording of two concerts of the "Harajuku Lovers Tour 2005" (November 26 & 28th, 2005 as seen on the end credits). Both shows were performed in the Honda Centre (then known as Arrowhead Pond) in Anaheim, California, where Gwen Stefani was raised. The concert's set list includes all twelve of the songs from Love. Angel. Music. Baby., plus two new tracks, "Wind It Up" and "Orange County Girl", from The Sweet Escape. "Wind It Up" and "Orange County Girl" were two of the four songs written and recorded in summer 2005 by Stefani during her sessions with Pharrell Williams and had been previewed at the finale of New York's Olympus Fashion Week for the 2006 collection of Stefani's line of clothing, L.A.M.B, in September 2005. "Wind It Up" was later released as the lead single from The Sweet Escape.

The DVD includes extra features: a "Countdown to Tour" documentary of behind-the-scenes preparation footage with Stefani, a series of interviews with Stefani's five band members and eight dancers (including the four Harajuku Girls) called "Meet the Band and Dancers", a photo gallery of images from the concert and a video of an alternative performance of the song "The Real Thing", called "The Real Thing Camera Remix". "Countdown to Tour" was described by one reviewer as "boring", but by another as "fascinating for anyone interested in how massive stadium tours develop", praising how Stefani "shares how she works her strengths".

== Reception ==
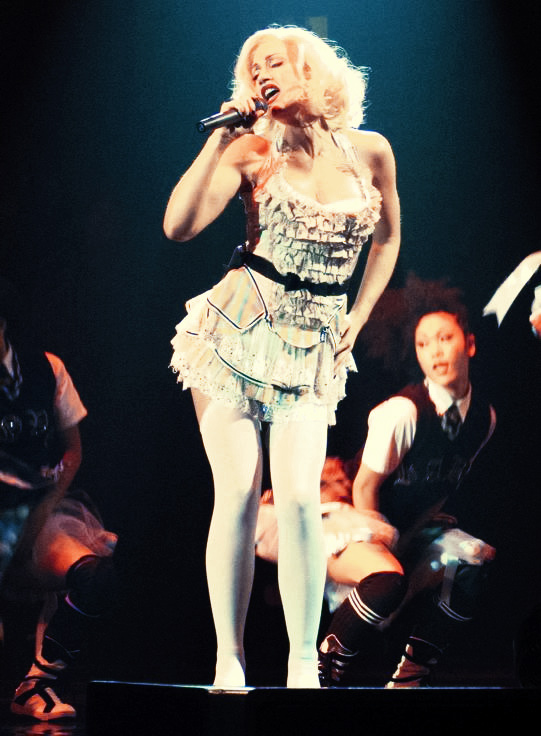
Stefani on the Harajuku Lovers Tour, singing "What You Waiting For?". Critics commented on her flamboyant costumes during the concert. In the background, one of Stefani's Japanese backing dancers is visible.

=== Sales and accreditations ===
The DVD was certified gold in Australia by the Australian Recording Industry Association, indicating sales of at least 7,500 copies; and platinum in Canada by the Canadian Recording Industry Association, indicating sales of over 10,000 copies.

=== Critical reception ===
Chart Attack reviewer Jodi Goulart gave Harajuku Lovers Live two out of five stars, criticising the DVD for being "no frills" and an "essentially word-for-word, dance-move-for-dance-move" copy of a performance fans saw a year earlier. Goulart comments that "concert experience doesn't translate well", notes the long gaps for costume changes and calls the extra features "boring". Shawn Revelle, in the Mid-Atlantic Edition of EXP magazine, gave Harajuku Lovers Live four stars, describing the DVD as "spectacular" and Stefani's performance as "energetic". He complimented the performances of "Rich Girl", "Long Way to Go" and "Hollaback Girl", calling them "stellar" and the "highlights" of the DVD.

Manchester Evening News reviewer Glenn Meads gave the DVD three out of five stars and compared Stefani to Madonna. Meads described the show as "stunning" and "polished to perfection", praising Stefani for "[involving] the audience on every level" and "[bringing] an assertiveness back to pop music". He compliments the performances of the songs "What You Waiting For?", "Crash", "Hollaback Girl" and "The Real Thing", calling the former the "strongest" of all the songs and its performance "infectious". However, he criticised Stefani's wide variety of musical styles and the long gaps between songs needed for costume changes. DJ Pusspuss Benji of the San Francisco Bay Times reviewed the DVD, calling it a "wet-dream to any Gwen fan" and describing Stefani as "a fashion icon, a blond threat and visionary artist" and her music as "delicious dance" and full of "pop insta-classics".

== Track listing ==
| No. | Title | Writer(s) | Length |
|---|---|---|---|
| 1. | "Harajuku Girls" | Stefani, Bobby Avila, I J Avila, James Harris, Terry Lewis, J Wright | 5:20 |
| 2. | "What You Waiting For?" | Stefani, Linda Perry | 4:44 |
| 3. | "The Real Thing" | Stefani, Perry, GMR | 6:25 |
| 4. | "Crash" | Stefani, Tony Kanal | 9:19 |
| 5. | "Luxurious" | Stefani, O'Kelly Isley, Rudolph Isley, Vernon Isley, Marvin Isley, Chris Jasper, Kanal | 7:16 |
| 6. | "Rich Girl" | Stefani, Eve, Dr. Dre, Kara DioGuardi, Chantal Kreviazuk, Mark Batson, Jerry Bock, Mike Elizondo, Sheldon Harnick | 4:17 |
| 7. | "Danger Zone" | Stefani, D Austin, Perry | 4:04 |
| 8. | "Long Way to Go" | Stefani, A Benjamin | 5:12 |
| 9. | "Wind It Up" | Stefani, Rodgers and Hammerstein, Pharrell Williams | 3:35 |
| 10. | "Orange County Girl" | Stefani, Williams | 5:06 |
| 11. | "Cool" | Stefani, Austin | 3:25 |
| 12. | "Serious" | Stefani, Kanal | 8:25 |
| 13. | "Bubble Pop Electric" | Stefani, Benjamin, Seven | 4:50 |
| 14. | "Hollaback Girl" | Stefani, P Williams, C Hugo | 5:51 |

=== Bonus content ===
1. "Meet the Band and Dancers"
2. Photo gallery
3. "Countdown to Tour" documentary
4. "The Real Thing" camera remix

== Personnel ==
- Gwen Stefani – vocals
- Gail Ann Dorsey, Warren Fitzgerald, Gabrial McNair, Kristopher Pooley – backing vocals
- Zachary Alford – drums
- Gail Ann Dorsey, Warren Fitzgerald – guitar
- Gabrial McNair, Kristopher Pooley – keyboard
- Director – Sophie Muller
- Producer – Oil Factory Productions
- Programming – Kristopher Pooley
- Cover image – Nick Knight
- Back cover – Pete Black

== Certifications ==
| Region | Certification | Certified units/sales |
|---|---|---|
| Australia (ARIA) | Platinum | 15,000^{^} |
| Canada (Music Canada) | Platinum | 10,000^{^} |
^{^} Shipments figures based on certification alone.
