= Serious (Gwen Stefani song) =

Song by Gwen Stefani

from the album Love. Angel. Music. Baby.
- Released: November 12, 2004
- Studio: Kingsbury Studios, Los Feliz, Los Angeles, California
- Genre: Synth-pop
- Length: 4:48
- Label: Interscope
- Songwriters: Gwen Stefani; Tony Kanal
- Producers: Tony Kanal; Mark "Spike" Stent^{[a]}

"Serious" is a song by American singer Gwen Stefani for her debut solo studio album, Love. Angel. Music. Baby. (2004). It was released on November 12, 2004, along with the rest of the aforementioned album by Interscope Records. The track was written by Stefani and her No Doubt bandmate, Tony Kanal. The latter also produced the song with Mark "Spike" Stent, who Stefani and Kanal previously worked with on No Doubt's fifth studio album, Rock Steady (2001). "Serious" is a synth-pop song with lyrics pertaining to a strong romantic interest in a significant other.

"Serious" received generally positive reviews from music critics upon release and was frequently compared to the works of both early Madonna and Kylie Minogue, particularly Minogue's track, "Fever". The song was also received well for its mirror production to '80s songs, with additional praise for being "catchy". An accompanying music video for the recording was filmed in Los Angeles but never released; however, a low-quality clip of the video surfaced on YouTube in 2006. Stefani performed the track on her 2005 Harajuku Lovers Tour during the encore of the show, where she danced with the Harajuku Girls in nurse costumes.

== Background and composition ==
In early 2003, Stefani began embarking on recording sessions for her debut album. After listening to songs recommended to her by No Doubt bassist and former boyfriend Tony Kanal, she considered recording material that "modernized 1980s music". After writing a series of several songs, including "Serious", "Crash", and "Luxurious", the pair gave up after Stefani didn't find anything worth recording from the sessions. When asked about the aforementioned collaborations, Stefani expressed her doubts of whether or not her newly recorded material would be any good: "If I were to write the chorus of 'Yesterday' by the Beatles, and that's all I wrote, that would be good enough to be part of that history." Due to Stefani's doubts, the project began a six-month hiatus, which resulted in the singer deciding to collaborate with various new musicians instead. Stefani's change of heart also ensured her work with Kanal would end up on Love. Angel. Music. Baby..

"Serious" takes influence from the "'80s style" and dance music genres, which in turn drew frequent comparisons to the works of Madonna and Club Nouveau. It contains a string melody alongside a synthpop rhythm. Opening with "an orchestral [...] before diving into a Prince-ready bumping drum beat and ambient synth", Stefani sings: "I think I'm coming down with something / I think I'm gonna need your medicine" in a provocative tone. The use of cri de coeur is also present. Hazel Cills from Vice found the aforementioned lyric reminiscent of Carol Douglas' 1974 cover of "Doctor's Orders". In between different exclamations "centered around Stefani's manic love", she also announces "breathy, vaudeville 'Oohs' and 'Yeahs'". Theon Weber of Spin described the composition: "'Serious' carved out a bittersweet niche that applied loping ska upstrokes to new-wave synth washes and blurred warm feelings about lovers into warm feelings about the synth-pop era."

== Critical reception ==
Upon release, the song received generally positive reviews from music critics. Many reviewers noted similarities to works of early Madonna and Kylie Minogue, with the song being compared to several of the singers' songs. Jason Damas from PopMatters praised the track for being "a sure contender for future single release", in addition to calling it his "favorite song on the album". He further added: "No Doubt fans who always secretly suspected that Stefani may someday move to become a Madonna-like dance diva will find their proof in this cut, which plagiarizes Kylie Minogue's "Fever" but makes the song even bigger and catchier." Winnie McCroy of The Villager claimed that "Serious" has staying power; he continued: "Despite your best attempts to shake it, you will find yourself humming the chorus", later comparing the track to Madonna's 1992 single "Erotica", and Falco's 1985 single "Rock Me Amadeus". Also in a highly positive review, Sal Cinquemani of Slant Magazine favored "Serious" for "flawlessly recreat[ing] the throwaway lyrics, vocal phrasing and background vocals, and synth sounds of the '80s".

A critic from Sputnikmusic awarded the recording five out of a five stars, calling it "one of the better songs on the album". The reviewer noted Kanal's role in the song's production: "this song wouldn't be that wonderful without him". Another highly positive review came from Marcus Floyd from Renowned for Sound; in his review of the parent record, he called it "another catchy melody and addictive arrangement from the platinum blonde star". Lisa Haines, a music editor and columnist for BBC, was less favorable in her review, opining that "the cheeky upstart charm Madonna sported in the 80s is embraced to shrewd effect" for the track's duration.

== Promotion ==
=== Music video ===
Stefani and the Harajuku Girls dancing on a rooftop in the unreleased music video for "Serious"

A music video was produced for the song, but it was never officially released. Stefani's long time collaborator, Sophie Muller, directed the music video during Gwen's first concert tour entitled Harajuku Lovers Tour. A minute long clip of the video surfaced on YouTube on October 13, 2006. At the beginning of the clip, Stefani and her dance troupe, the Harajuku Girls, are shown dancing on various rooftops in a city. The women also appear in front of a yellow building advertisement that reads "Cash Loan" in a red font, followed by "Buy · Sell · Trade" in a green font below. The ladies sport "'80s hairstyles", to which a critic from Spin predicted was in an attempt "to rival some of the best videos from two decades ago". Other parts of the video display the dancers wearing jumpsuits or camouflage outfits; Stefani also wears a denim skirt or a pair of white shorts with a matching tank top. The clip was featured in a list compiled by VH1's Christopher Rosa, titled "8 Amazing Unreleased Music Videos That We Really Need To See". Rosa noted that the video "is now virtually unfindable on the Web", and was disappointed by stating: "We wanted some Madonna realness, Gwen!"

=== Live performances ===
Stefani included the song on the setlist for her 2005 concert tour entitled Harajuku Lovers Tour. The track was performed as a finale/encore alongside "Bubble Pop Electric" during the original setlist of the show, but was performed earlier in later shows as "Hollaback Girl" became the new encore, preceded by "Serious" and the aforementioned song. In the performance, Stefani was carried out in a stretcher by the Harajuku Girls, dressed up as nurses.

== Credits and personnel ==
Personnel

- Gwen Stefani – lead vocals, songwriting
- Lee Groves – keyboards, programming, mixing
- Rob Haggett – assistant engineering, mixing
- Tony Kanal – keyboards, production, programming, synthesizer
- Colin "Dog" Mitchell – additional recording
- Mark "Spike" Stent – producer^{[a]}, mixing
- David Treahearn – assistant engineering, mixing
- Kingsbury Studios, Los Feliz, California – recording location
- The Mix Suite, Olympic Studios, London, England – mixing location

Credits adapted from the liner notes of Love. Angel. Music. Baby.

== Notes ==
- ^{^a} signifies an additional producer
