= The Real Thing (Gwen Stefani song) =

Song by Gwen Stefani

from the album Love. Angel. Music. Baby.
- Released: 2004
- Studio: Home Recordings (London); Henson (Hollywood, California)
- Genre: Synth-pop; Europop; new wave
- Length: 4:09
- Label: Interscope
- Songwriters: Gwen Stefani; Linda Perry; Gavin Rossdale
- Producer: Nellee Hooper

"The Real Thing" is a song by American singer and songwriter Gwen Stefani from her debut studio album, Love. Angel. Music. Baby. (2004). It was produced by Nellee Hooper and written by Stefani, Linda Perry, and Stefani's then-husband Gavin Rossdale, who is credited under the moniker GMR. Inspired by the music of New Order, Stefani approached the group with the idea of collaborating. Despite initially declining, they eventually changed their minds and lent members Bernard Sumner and Peter Hook to perform background vocals and bass, respectively. American duo Wendy & Lisa also contribute to the song's instrumentation, playing guitar and keyboards, and created a "Slow Jam Remix" of the song which appears on the select editions of the parent album.

"The Real Thing" has been described as a synth-pop, Europop, and new wave ballad influenced by the music of the 1980s. It contains romantic lyrics and was referred to as a love song about Rossdale. It received generally positive reviews from music critics, who frequently called it one of the best songs on Love. Angel. Music. Baby.. Other critics felt the decision to collaborate with several high-profile musicians paid off. However, some critics considered the lyrics to be cheesy. The song was featured in Stefani's first two solo concert tours, the Harajuku Lovers Tour in 2005 and the Sweet Escape Tour in 2007. She also included it in her promotional MasterCard Priceless Surprises Presents Gwen Stefani (2015–2016) concert series. American group Vitamin String Quartet recorded and released a cover of "The Real Thing" in 2005.

== Background and release ==
In 2004, American singer and songwriter Gwen Stefani released her first solo studio album, Love. Angel. Music. Baby.. She referred to the project as a dance record that would fulfill her idea of completing a side project outside of her band No Doubt. She began work on the project in 2003, following the end of her work promoting No Doubt's fifth studio album, Rock Steady (2001). "The Real Thing" appears on Love. Angel. Music. Baby. as the album's ninth track and was first released on November 12, 2004. The song was written by Stefani, Linda Perry, and Stefani's then-husband Gavin Rossdale, who is credited under the moniker of GMR. Production was handled by Nellee Hooper, with Mark "Spike" Stent serving as an additional producer. Stefani recorded the song at Henson Recording Studios in Hollywood and at her home studios in London, where Stent mixed the track at nearby Olympic Studios.

When she met with Perry to initiate songwriting sessions, Stefani had difficulty sticking to Perry's faster work pace, resulting in incidents of emotional distress. After successfully writing debut single "What You Waiting For?" (2004), the two began having more creative experiences together. In celebration of the album's fifteenth anniversary, Billboard's Bianca Gracie interviewed Stefani, who reminisced about her collaboration with Perry on "The Real Thing":

Linda really wanted to do what I wanted and was all about praising me. It was beautiful because I could tell her, 'I really love this song and I want to sound like this so bad.' I would come in the next day and she would've done it. She would do the music part, I'd write the lyrics and we'd write the melodies together. I'm very specific about lyrics – that's the one thing I wouldn't really collaborate on.

While developing a concept for Love. Angel. Music. Baby., Stefani felt inspired by the music of Prince, New Order, Club Nouveau, and Madonna, and wanted to create a feel-good dance-pop album. During songwriting sessions for the album, she approached New Order with an idea that they would collaborate with her on a song. Because they were in the process of creating original lyrics for their eighth studio album, Waiting for the Sirens' Call (2005), they declined her offer, leaving Stefani to write a song in the style of the group instead. However, after hearing the track she wrote, they decided to play on it, explaining that they admire Stefani as an artist and were also recently impressed by a remix of her debut single "What You Waiting For?". Stefani ultimately enlisted members Peter Hook to play on bass, and lead vocalist Bernard Sumner to provide background vocals on "The Real Thing". Due to the song's many collaborators, Niall McMurray from Into the Pop Void assumed that Stefani was likely unable to work with them all simultaneously.

== Composition and lyrics ==
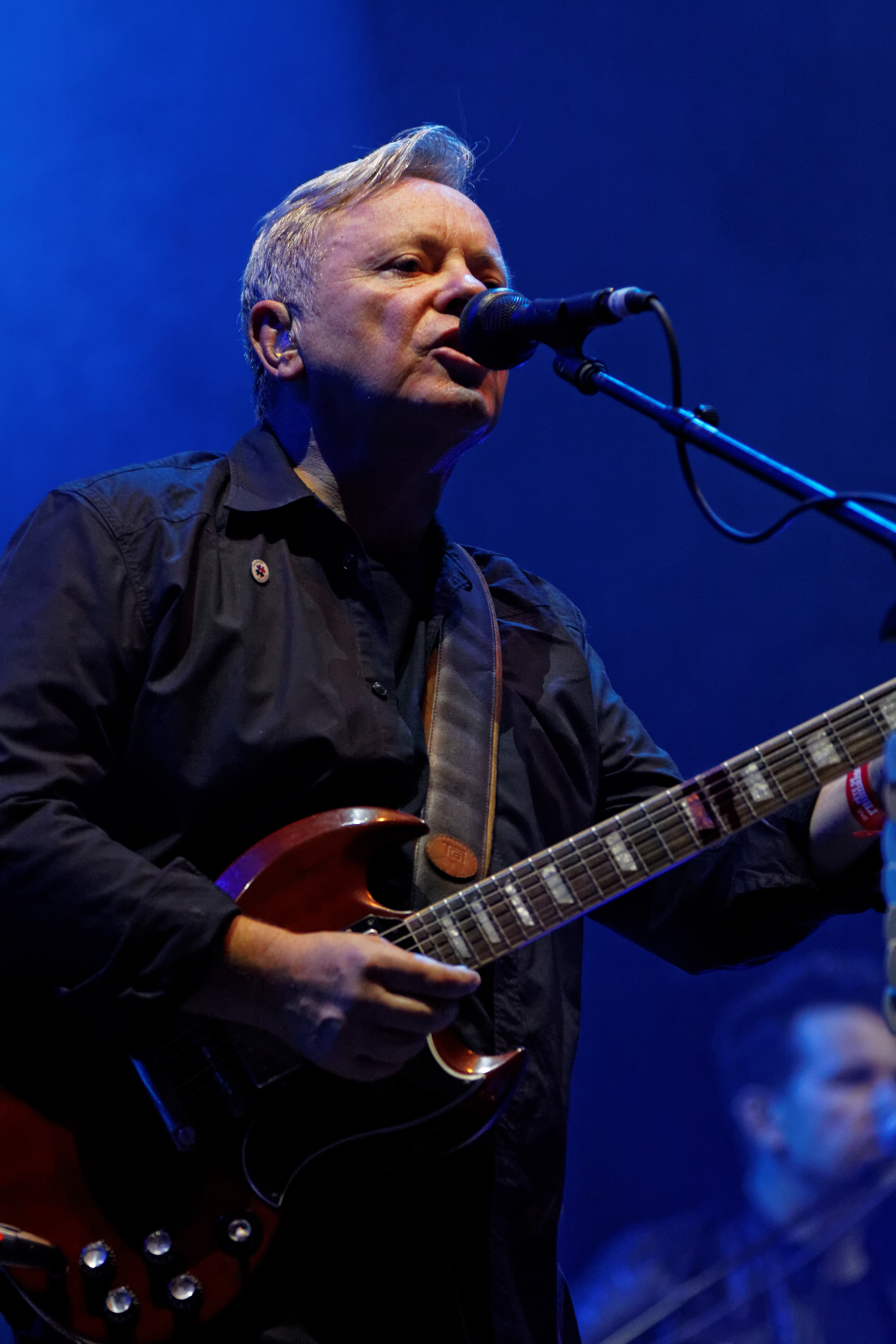
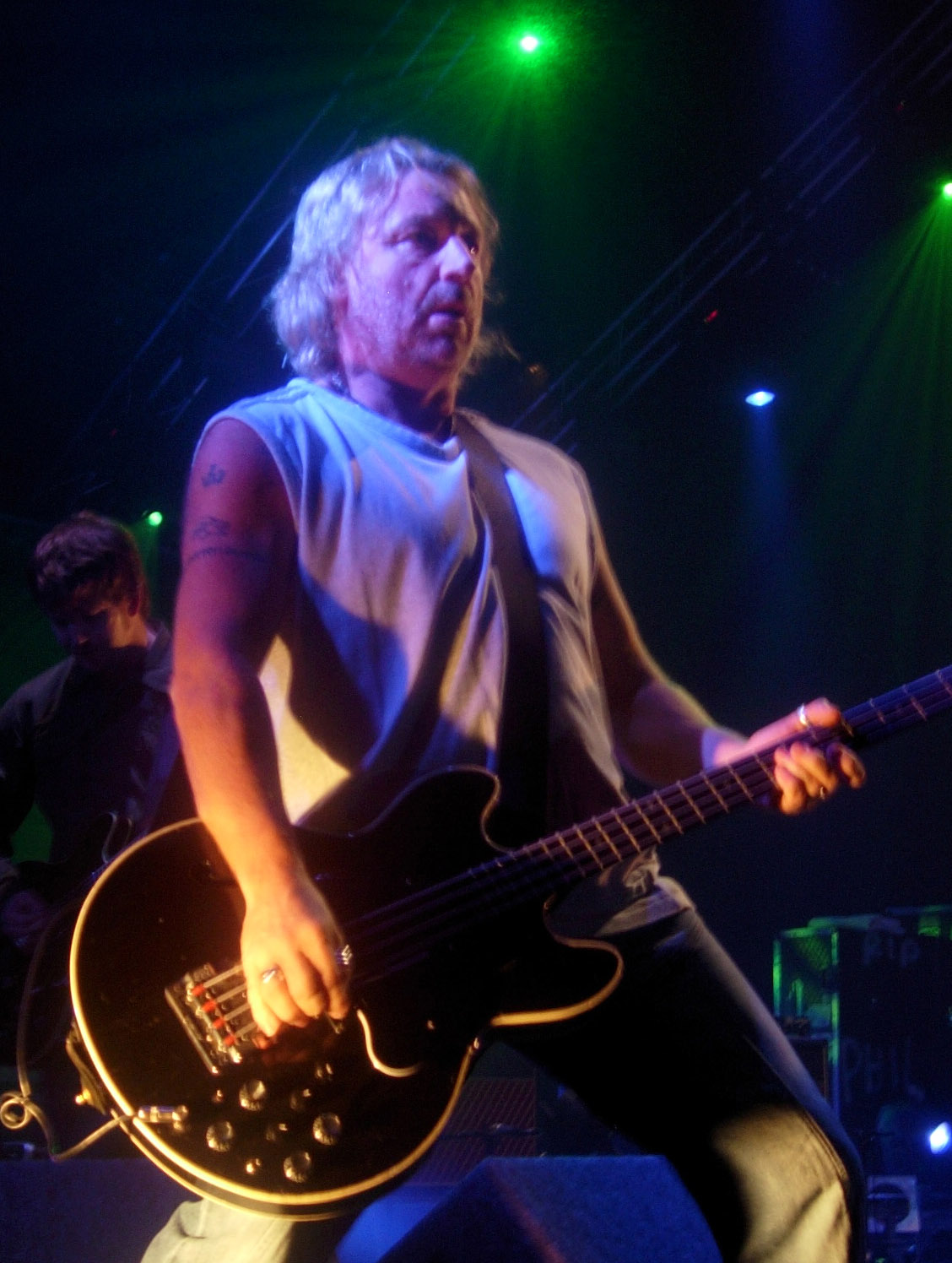
New Order members Bernard Sumner (left) and Peter Hook (right) perform background vocals and bass, respectively, on "The Real Thing", which was inspired by their group's older music.

Musically, "The Real Thing" has been described as a "beat-driven" synth-pop, Europop, and new wave ballad. The Miami Herald's Howard Cohen felt the song would appeal to a mostly teen-fanbase and compared Stefani's singing style to that of Madonna. David Browne from Entertainment Weekly described the track's genre as "glacial '80s synthpop" while Jenny Eliscu from Rolling Stone called the song "so eighties, in fact, that members of New Order are the backing band". Slant Magazine's Sal Cinquemani described the song as Europop inspired by the style of American musician Prince. John Murphy from musicOMH compared "The Real Thing" to Love. Angel. Music. Baby.'s "Cool" and No Doubt's 1995 single "Don't Speak", calling them all emotional ballads that extend "out an olive branch to an ex-lover". Also finding it similar to "Cool", Jennifer Nine from Launch said that Hook's bass in the instrumentation sounds like a "dreamy combination" of Cyndi Lauper's "Time After Time" (1984) and Madonna's "True Blue" (1986). Also acknowledging the song's 1980s influence, Anthony Carew from Neumu compared the song's musical direction to Stefani's work on Rock Steady, comparing their "stylistic tricks" and presence of "brightly-colored keyboards". Jason Damas from PopMatters also noticed similarities to No Doubt's discography.

According to the sheet music for Love. Angel. Music. Baby., "The Real Thing" is set in common time and has a moderate dance tempo of 120 beats per minute. The key of the song is in A-flat major, with Stefani's vocal range spanning an entire octave, from E_{3} to D_{5} in scientific pitch notation. The song begins with an instrumental introduction, created by Wendy & Lisa, followed by the Hook's first usage of bass, which McMurrary felt was a "sudden thrilling moment where you get to what New Order might have sounded like [if] fronted by a girl". The chord progressions of G–A–Fm–G are used in the verses, with the pre-chorus following a slightly faster-sounding progression of B-A-G-Em-A. The song's chorus returns to the initial verse progression, and is quickly succeeded by the second verse. In addition to the guitar and keyboard instrumentation from Wendy & Lisa, Lee Groves is also credited for performing on a keyboard, alongside Greg Collins, who recorded the song and played on the electric guitar and slide guitar.

The lyrics to "The Real Thing" are romantic and deal with "loving your man in spite of it all", and the song itself was referred to as a love song. Mark Robisch, a writer for Thought Catalog, explained that the song was about Stefani's "deep love" for her husband. Mike Wass from Idolator assumed that Stefani was singing about Rossdale in the song, noting the opening lines: "I've seen your face a thousand times, have all your stories memorized / I've kissed your lips a million ways, but I still love to have you around"; he also said that it should not be a surprise that Rossdale received a writing credit in a Stefani-penned love song, calling the chorus especially "bittersweet" with the lyrics: "You're the one that I want and it's not just a phase / You're the one I trust, our love is the real thing".

== Critical reception ==
"The Real Thing" received generally positive reviews from music critics, who frequently labeled it as one of the strongest cuts from Love. Angel. Music. Baby. and appreciated the combined efforts of New Order and Wendy & Lisa. Rob Sheffield from Rolling Stone was impressed that by the collaboration of New Order and Wendy & Lisa, calling Stefani "some kind of visionary" for being able to pull it off. In a similar vein, Kathi Kamen Goldmark Common Sense Media was surprised that their combination of sounds "actually works". Cinquemani, who claimed the song was influenced by the works of Prince, said it was perfection: "she may not have been able to get Prince to sign on to the project, but she got the next best thing" with Wendy & Lisa. Murphy liked the song, calling it "another poppy ballad which gets away with some cheesy lyrics by being touchingly sincere, making it probably the best track on the album," while the staff at People referred to the song as a gem. Carew labeled it as one of the album's "obligatory cuts" and Nine called the song one of the best on Love. Angel. Music. Baby. due to "those endearingly heartfelt diary-page reflections".

Several critics suggested that "The Real Thing" should have been released as a single. McMurrary admitted that he was "desperate for ["The Real Thing"] to be a single," as he felt the song was "absolute perfection". In a 2020 review of "The Real Thing", Wass called the song a "lost hit" and used it as "irrefutable evidence" that some of the album cuts on Love. Angel. Music. Baby. are better than the singles; additionally, he insisted that "it has only improved with age" and praised Hooper's production. Hazel Cills from Vice disliked the song, calling it a ripoff of New Order's musical style. Labeling it "the cheesiest moment on the album", Marcus Floyd from Renowned for Sound said that the song's sappiness was not "enough to stop you from singing along to it though". The Gay City News' Winnie McCroy felt the song was dated, calling it slightly better than "Cool" and evocative of American singer Debbie Gibson.

Charles Merwin, a writer for Stylus Magazine, criticized "The Real Thing" for being tepid, writing that Perry's work only added "depth to an already three-dimensional character". Pitchfork's Nick Sylvester panned the track, calling it a Karaoke Revolution version of New Order's 1986 single "Bizarre Love Triangle" that had been "unbizarrif[ied], unlove[d], and untriangulate[d]". He continued: "Seriously, anyone remotely involved with 'The Real Thing' should find a stray dog and let it bite him". Paul Flynn from The Observer and Sean Daly from The Washington Post also felt "The Real Thing" sounded similar to the New Order single, but Daly enjoyed it and called it "essentially a lush update" of "Bizarre Love Triangle".

== Live performances ==
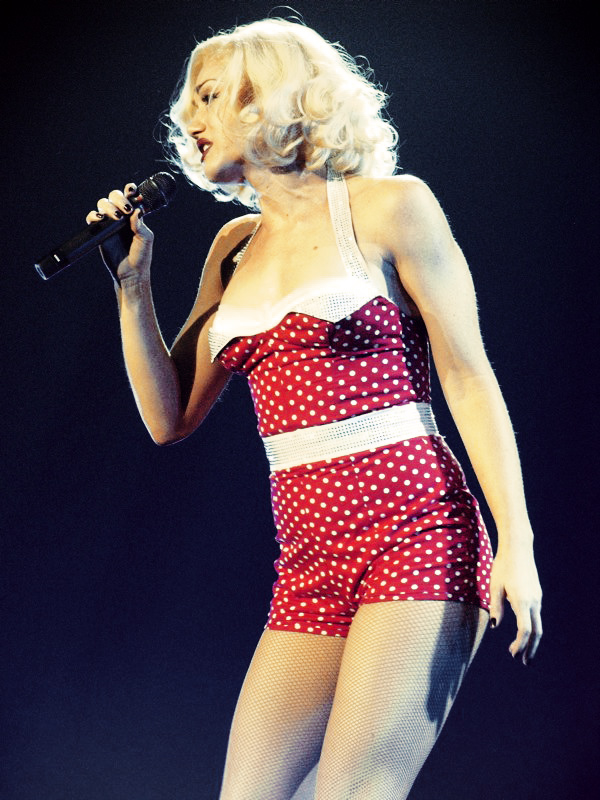
Stefani singing "The Real Thing" during a live performance from the Harajuku Lovers Tour (2005).

Stefani first performed "The Real Thing" during her first solo concert tour, the Harajuku Lovers Tour, in late 2005. It was used as the show's third song, following "What You Waiting For?" and before Love. Angel. Music. Baby. single "Luxurious" (2005). For the performance of "The Real Thing", Stefani was joined by her backup dancer troupe, the Harajuku Girls, who were dressed as "Malibu Barbie" dolls. Melissa Maerz from Spin, reviewing Stefani's show at Madison Square Garden in New York City, felt that the dancers were busy during the performance, and noted that they were accompanied by four breakdancers demonstrating acrobatic headspins. Jane Stevenson from the Toronto Sun called the performance a concert standout, and claimed that it created high expectations for the rest of the show. Comparing her stage presence to Madonna, Corey Moss from MTV News joked that Stefani could have retitled "The Real Thing" to "Lucky Star 2005" due to their similarities.

"The Real Thing" was also included on the setlist to the Sweet Escape Tour, her second concert series from 2007. It was featured during the show's encore segment, in between songs "Orange County Girl" (2006) and "What You Waiting For?". American musician Gail Ann Dorsey joined Stefani as a vocalist for "The Real Thing". Prior to singing the song at her show in Sydney, Stefani dedicated the performance to her eldest son. Derek Paiva, the entertainment writer for The Honolulu Advertiser, provided a positive review of the live rendition, praising Dorsey's vocal abilities. He continued: "Bonus points to Stefani for even daring to match [her] vocal skills".

In 2015 and 2016, Stefani presented a limited appearance promotional concert tour titled MasterCard Priceless Surprises Presents Gwen Stefani, serving as her first solo tour since the Sweet Escape Tour in 2007. "The Real Thing" was included in the show's premiere, which occurred on February 7, 2015. As she performed, a background video displaying Stefani swimming in a lap pool was shown. Billboard writer Andrew Hampp called the song's performance "just as compelling" as her renditions of more popular songs.

== Other versions ==
On various international editions of Love. Angel. Music. Baby., the Wendy & Lisa Slow Jam Remix of "The Real Thing" is included as a bonus track. In the United States, the remix was eventually featured on the deluxe edition reissued digital version of the album. On November 15, 2005, American group Vitamin String Quartet released the tribute album The String Quartet Tribute to Gwen Stefani, consisting of 12 covers of Stefani and No Doubt songs, including one of "The Real Thing". Johnny Loftus from AllMusic labeled their chamber rendition as boring, writing that something else "besides Stefani's voice is lost in [their] translation". Legends Karaoke and Deluxe Karaoke created karaoke versions of "The Real Thing" for their 2007 and 2019 tribute albums to Stefani, respectively.

== Credits and personnel ==
Credits adapted from the liner notes of Love. Angel. Music. Baby..

- Gwen Stefani – performer, lyrics
- Linda Perry – lyrics
- GMR – lyrics
- Nellee Hooper – production
- Mark "Spike" Stent – additional production
- Greg Collins – recording, electric guitar, slide guitar
- Simon Gogerly – recording
- Ewan Pearson – programming
- Aidan Love – programming
- Jason Lader – programming
- Ian Rossiter – engineering assistance
- Kevin Mills – engineering assistance
- Wendy Melvoin – guitar
- Lisa Coleman – keyboards
- Peter Hook – bass
- Bernard Sumner – background vocals
- David Treahearn – engineering assistance
- Lee Groves – mix programming, keyboards
- Rob Haggett – second engineering assistance
