= Wind It Up (Gwen Stefani song) =

2006 single by Gwen Stefani

Single by Gwen Stefani

from the album The Sweet Escape
- Released: October 30, 2006
- Recorded: 2005
- Studio: South Beach (Miami Beach, Florida); Record Plant, Capitol (Los Angeles, California)
- Genre: Alternative hip-hop; dance-pop
- Length: 3:09
- Label: Interscope
- Songwriters: Gwen Stefani; Pharrell Williams; Richard Rodgers; Oscar Hammerstein II
- Producer: The Neptunes

Gwen Stefani singles chronology
"Crash" (2006)	"Wind It Up" (2006)	"The Sweet Escape" (2006)

Music video
- "Wind It Up" on YouTube

"Wind It Up" is a song by American singer Gwen Stefani, released as the lead single from her second solo studio album, The Sweet Escape (2006). Originally written for inclusion on Stefani's Harajuku Lovers Tour, the song was later recorded for the album.

Despite an unfavorable reception from most music critics, who criticized the song's use of yodeling and found the track to be over the top, the song was commercially successful, reaching the top 20 in many music markets. As the song contains an interpolation of "The Lonely Goatherd" from Rodgers and Hammerstein's Trapp Family biographical musical The Sound of Music, its accompanying music video, directed by Sophie Muller, takes influence from the musical.

== Background and writing ==
In July 2005, Stefani began writing and recording material with Pharrell Williams in Miami, Florida. During one of their sessions, they penned "Wind It Up" for a September 2005 fashion show revealing the 2006 collection of Stefani's fashion line L.A.M.B.

Stefani asked DJ Jeremy Healy to create a mashup of the song and "The Lonely Goatherd", a song from Rodgers and Hammerstein's Trapp Family biographical musical The Sound of Music. Stefani considered The Sound of Music her favorite film, and she had always wanted to incorporate a beat to one of its songs. Stefani commented, "I literally cried, and I'm not exaggerating, when I heard the mash-up." Williams, however, did not like the addition of yodeling and The Sound of Music to the track, although he later admitted on The Late Late Show with James Corden (coincidentally also appearing with Stefani) that he "came around" because "the magic in it was kinda like her being lit up about it" and "it's [her] song."

The lyrics are not narrative, and Stefani stated, "A song like 'Wind It Up' isn't about anything." In the song, Stefani discusses how boys watch girls dance. The song includes a reference to Stefani's fashion line, with Stefani going, "They like the way that L.A.M.B. is going 'cross my shirt".

== Critical reception ==
"Wind It Up" received mostly negative reviews by contemporary pop music critics. Entertainment Weekly's Michael Slezak found the bassline "rubbery" and criticized the song for lacking a melody as well as its reference to Stefani's own clothing line. Stephen Thomas Erlewine of AllMusic stated that the Neptunes had forced the sampling "into one of their typical minimalist tracks, over which Gwen spouts off clumsy material-minded lyrics touting her fashion line and her shape". Bill Lamb of About.com rated the song three and a half stars, giving it "high marks for entertainment value", but commented that it sounded like a retread of "Rich Girl" from Stefani's debut album Love. Angel. Music. Baby. Charles Merwin of Stylus Magazine was mixed on the track, writing that "it's preventing something far less interesting from getting played." John Murphy from musicOMH panned the track as "just horrible, and possibly the worst start to an album this year". Spence D. from IGN characterized the song as "a bugged out Sound of Music bhangra blitz that sounds like part M.I.A. and part Julie Andrews".

Many criticized the inclusion of yodeling and "The Lonely Goatherd" sample. In a review for Rolling Stone, Rob Sheffield called the track "yodel-trocious" and argued that "the problem isn't the Swiss Miss motif so much as the fourth-rate Neptunes track". Caroline Sullivan of The Guardian was pleased with the track, describing the yodeling as "off-her-head", and referred to the track as "a pinnacle of madness". IndieLondon's Jack Foley noted "Wind It Up" as a highlight of The Sweet Escape and called it "Stefani's gift that she can take something that, on paper, sounds cheesy and make it utterly, utterly cool." USA Today's Ken Barnes, however, found the track "campy" and "a tacky attempt at sexiness", adding that the combination of yodeling and the interpolation was "awkward". Alex Miller of the NME also found the song campy, commenting that its "dumb sexual bravado has all the sophistication of a teenage boy's wet dream", and compared the yodeling, interpolation, and "erotic rap" to "a trench foot which screams for amputation from the tracklisting".

== Commercial performance ==
"Wind It Up" debuted on the US Billboard Hot 100 at number 40 on the issue dated November 18, 2006, becoming Stefani's highest debut on the chart, both solo and as a member of No Doubt. It peaked four weeks later at number six and remained on the chart for 18 weeks. It peaked at number seven on the Pop 100 chart, but was less successful on the Pop 100 Airplay chart, only reaching number 19. The single performed well in clubs, reaching number five on the Hot Dance Club Play chart, and peaked at number 18 on the Mainstream Top 40 chart.

"Wind It Up" met similar success in Europe, reaching number five on the European Hot 100 Singles. The single debuted at number eight on the UK Singles Chart, selling 10,381 downloads in its first week. The following week, it rose to number three (behind Take That's "Patience" and Cliff Richard's "21st Century Christmas") with 17,706 copies sold, earning Stefani her second highest-peaking single in the United Kingdom after "The Sweet Escape". It had success across the continent, reaching the top 10 in Belgium, the Czech Republic, Finland, Ireland, Italy, the Netherlands, and Norway, the top 20 in Austria, France, Sweden, and Switzerland, and the top 30 in Germany and Greece.

The song was also successful in Oceania. In Australia, "Wind It Up" debuted at number eight on the ARIA Singles Chart and spent its first seven weeks within the top 10. It peaked at number five in its fifth week on the run, spending 19 weeks on the chart, and was certified gold by the Australian Recording Industry Association (ARIA). The track topped the New Zealand Singles Chart in its third and fourth week, and stayed on the chart for 20 weeks altogether. Three years later, on March 14, 2010, the Recording Industry Association of New Zealand (RIANZ) certified "Wind It Up" gold.

In Canada, "Wind It Up" became Stefani's first number-one hit in the country, reaching number one on the Canadian Digital Song Sales chart for one week on the chart dated December 23, 2006. Furthermore, the song debuted on the Canada CHR/Top 40 Chart at number 27 on November 18, 2006, and peaked at number three five weeks later. It remained on the chart for 11 weeks total. Finally, on the very first week of the Canadian Hot 100 on March 31, 2007, it gained a spot at number 91, at the very end of the song's charting period.

== Music video ==
The music video features a key motif and incorporations of The Sound of Music

The song's music video, directed by Sophie Muller, was shot in two days on October 30–31, 2006. Although it does not follow a substantial plot, it features outfits and scenes inspired by The Sound of Music. Stefani and her Harajuku Girls are often dancing in front of fields of flowers and a background of key-like symbols composed of two G's placed back to back. In a scene mimicking The Sound of Music, Stefani portrays Maria von Trapp while pajama-clad dancers, portraying her children, jump on a bed. In another scene, Stefani uses curtains to create sailor suits for the Harajuku Girls. Stefani also appears as a nun and an orchestra conductor. One scene uses smoke to create the illusion that Stefani is a submerged escape artist searching for a key. She pulls the key, a symbol of "the sweet escape", from her mouth, alluding to performances by escapologist Harry Houdini. The song's title is often visualized by a colorful sign that reads "wind it up". Another video was produced in 3-D, but this version was never released. After seeing the video, Jimmy Iovine, co-founder of Interscope Records, decided to work with James Cameron to produce other 3-D music presentations.

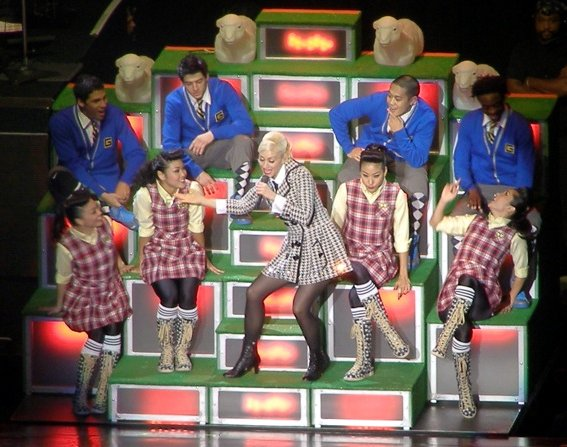
The stage was designed like a hill with sheep for performances on The Sweet Escape Tour, as a reference to a scene from The Sound of Music

The video was successful on music video television programs. "Wind It Up" first aired on November 10, 2006, on MTV and the same day it premiered online on MTV Overdrive. Two days later, on November 13, 2006, "Wind It Up" premiered on the station's top-10 chart program Total Request Live. The video debuted at number eight on the countdown and reached a peak at number two. After its November 17 debut on MuchMusic's Countdown, it reached number two for the week of January 26, 2007. In a review of the music video, The Guardian's Anna Pickard poked fun at the number of personas that appear in the video, referring to some of them as "Nunzilla", "Gweninatrix", and "CinderGwennie", and commented that "your speakers have a mute setting for good reason."

== Track listings ==
- UK, European, and Australian CD single
1. "Wind It Up" (Main Mix) – 3:11
2. "Wind It Up" (Original Neptunes Mix) – 3:08
- European CD maxi single
1. "Wind It Up" (Main Mix) – 3:11
2. "Wind It Up" (Original Neptunes Mix) – 3:08
3. "Wind It Up" (Original Neptunes Dub) – 3:08
4. "Wind It Up" (video) – 3:11
- UK 12-inch single

A1. "Wind It Up" (Main Mix) – 3:11
A2. "Wind It Up" (Original Neptunes Mix) – 3:08
B1. "Wind It Up" (Main Mix Instrumental) – 3:11
B2. "Wind It Up" (Original Neptunes Dub) – 3:10

== Credits and personnel ==
Credits are adapted from the liner notes of The Sweet Escape.

- Gwen Stefani – lead vocals, songwriting
- Pete Davis – additional keyboards, additional mix programming
- Alex Dromgoole – assistant engineering
- David Emery – assistant engineering
- Ron Fair – orchestra production
- Brian "Big Bass" Gardner – mastering
- Brian Garten – recording
- Hart Gunther – assistant engineering
- The Neptunes – production
- Mark "Spike" Stent – additional production, mixing
- Talent Bootcamp Kids – additional vocals
- Pharrell Williams – songwriting

== Charts ==
=== Weekly charts ===
Weekly chart performance for "Wind It Up"
Chart (2006–2007)	Peak position
Australia (ARIA)	5
Australian Urban (ARIA)	2
Austria (Ö3 Austria Top 40)	18
Belgium (Ultratop 50 Flanders)	8
Belgium (Ultratop 50 Wallonia)	7
Canada Digital Song Sales (Billboard)	1
Canada Hot 100 (Billboard)	91 (Note: The Canadian Hot 100 launched on March 31, 2007, well into "Wind It Up"'s charting period.)
Canada All-Format Airplay (Billboard)	18
Canada CHR/Top 40 (Billboard)	3
Canada Hot AC (Billboard)	33
CIS Airplay (TopHit)	16
Czech Republic Airplay (ČNS IFPI)	9
Denmark (Tracklisten)	14
Europe (European Hot 100 Singles)	5
Finland (Suomen virallinen lista)	6
France (SNEP)	12
Germany (GfK)	21
Global Dance Tracks (Billboard)	10
Greece (IFPI Greece)	26
Hungary (Dance Top 40)	38
Ireland (IRMA)	10
Italy (FIMI)	6
Lithuania (EHR)	2
Netherlands (Dutch Top 40)	4
Netherlands (Single Top 100)	6
New Zealand (Recorded Music NZ)	1
Norway (VG-lista)	7
Romania (Romanian Top 100)	12
Russia Airplay (TopHit)	21
Scottish Singles Sales (Official Charts)	6
Slovakia Airplay (ČNS IFPI)	23
Sweden (Sverigetopplistan)	20
Switzerland (Schweizer Hitparade)	14
UK Singles (Official Charts)	3
UK Hip Hop/R&B (Official Charts)	2
US Billboard Hot 100	6
US Dance Airplay (Billboard)	16
US Dance Club Songs (Billboard)	5
US Pop Airplay (Billboard)	18
US Pop 100 (Billboard)	7

=== Year-end charts ===
2006 year-end chart performance for "Wind It Up"
Chart (2006)	Position
Australia (ARIA)	67
Australian Urban (ARIA)	27
Netherlands (Dutch Top 40)	166
UK Singles (OCC)	145

2007 year-end chart performance for "Wind It Up"
Chart (2007)	Position
Australia (ARIA)	83
Australian Urban (ARIA)	29
Belgium (Ultratop 50 Flanders)	56
Belgium (Ultratop 50 Wallonia)	38
Brazil (Crowley)	82
CIS (TopHit)	126
Europe (European Hot 100 Singles)	52
Netherlands (Dutch Top 40)	70
Netherlands (Single Top 100)	81
Russia Airplay (TopHit)	170
US Billboard Hot 100	83
US Pop 100 (Billboard)	67

== Certifications ==
Certifications and sales for "Wind It Up"
Region	Certification	Certified units/sales
Australia (ARIA)	Gold	35,000^{^}
New Zealand (RMNZ)	Gold	5,000^{*}
United States (RIAA)	Platinum	1,000,000^{‡}
^{*} Sales figures based on certification alone.^{^} Shipments figures based on certification alone.^{‡} Sales+streaming figures based on certification alone.

== Release history ==
Release dates and formats for "Wind It Up"
Region	Date	Format(s)	Label	Ref(s).
United States	October 30, 2006	Contemporary hit radio	Interscope	
Germany	November 24, 2006	Digital download	Interscope	
Australia	November 27, 2006	CD single; digital download	Universal	
Germany	December 8, 2006	CD single; CD maxi single	Universal	
United Kingdom	December 11, 2006	CD single; digital download; 12-inch single	Polydor	
