= Harajuku Lovers Tour =

2005 concert tour by Gwen Stefani

- Debut tour by Gwen Stefani
- Promotional poster for the tour
- Location: North America
- Associated album: Love. Angel. Music. Baby.
- Start date: October 16, 2005
- End date: December 21, 2005
- Legs: 1
- No. of shows: 42 in North America

Gwen Stefani concert chronology
- Harajuku Lovers Tour (2005); The Sweet Escape Tour (2007)

The Harajuku Lovers Tour was the first solo concert tour of American recording artist Gwen Stefani. The tour began through October to December 2005, to support of her debut studio album Love. Angel. Music. Baby. (2004). Although Stefani embarked on multiple tours with her band No Doubt, she initially opted not to participate in a tour to promote her album, an attitude that the singer eventually abandoned due to the commercial success of Love. Angel. Music. Baby.

The tour consisted of only one leg, which encompassed a three-month-long series of performances that visited cities throughout the United States and Canada. Stefani recruited hip hop group The Black Eyed Peas, rapper M.I.A., and singer Ciara to accompany her as opening acts for her endeavors. The tour produced varying responses from contemporary critics, who despite praising Stefani's vocals, were critical of other aspects of the show such as its musical material.

A video album, titled Harajuku Lovers Live, was released in DVD format in conjunction with her 2006 album The Sweet Escape and features the singer performing at the Arrowhead Pond in Anaheim, California, Stefani's birthplace.

According to Billboard, the tour grossed $22 million from 37 concerts, from which 20 sold-out.

== Background ==
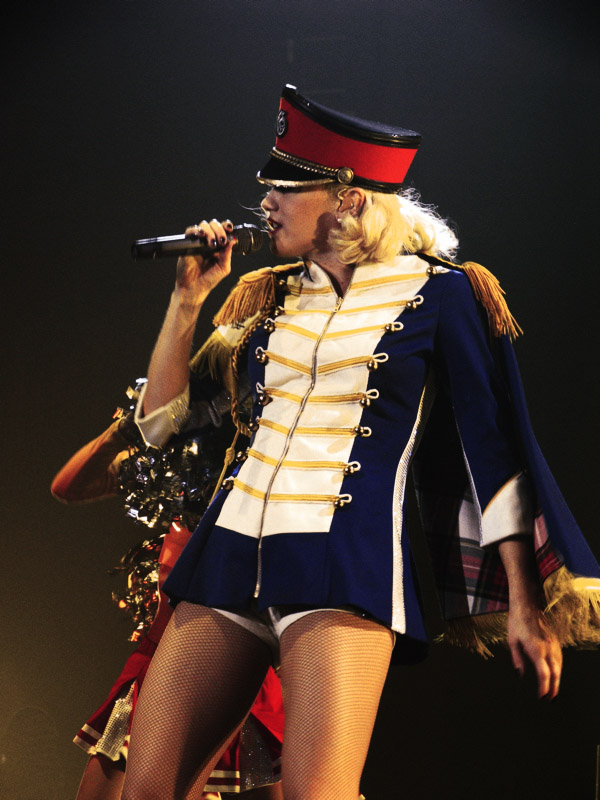
Stefani performing "Hollaback Girl", the third single from her debut solo album

Stefani announced a tour to support her first solo studio album Love. Angel. Music. Baby. (2004) on June 27, 2005, giving details of sixteen dates from October 16 to November 10.

The announcement on June 27 also included the fact that hip hop group The Black Eyed Peas, who are also signed to Interscope Records, would be the opening act for all the announced dates except November 3. The group, who were backing their album Monkey Business, ended up touring with Stefani until November 14. On August 8, it was announced that singer-songwriter and rapper M.I.A. would take over as the opening act from November 16 to November 25, although it wasn't until August 17 that the extra dates from November 11 to November 25 were officially added to the tour. M.I.A. toured with Stefani, backing her album Arular, until December 1. On September 29, the final set of dates, November 26 to December 21, were added to the tour and it was announced that the third and final opening act for Stefani's tour would be singer Ciara, backing her album Goodies, from December 3 to December 21.

Stefani initially did not intend to tour to support the album, responding "What tour?" to a question from MTV News in December 2004 regarding a possible tour. She later mentioned several times that she had not originally intended to tour in support of the album, referring to her "illegal tour" and apologizing for her breaking her promise not to tour on stage at the Xcel Energy Center in Saint Paul, Minnesota on November 14 and admitting "I just wanted to make a record. I didn't want to tour, I was too tired, then you guys kept buying the record, and I had to come out and see you guys" on stage at Winnipeg on November 16.

In a September interview with MTV News, Stefani said of the tour: "I'm looking forward to it, it's going to be unbelievable. [...] I would love to try to roll a little bit of 'Orange County Girl' in there. We'll see. Anything can happen in rehearsals. I don't even know how long the show can be right now."

== Concert synopsis ==
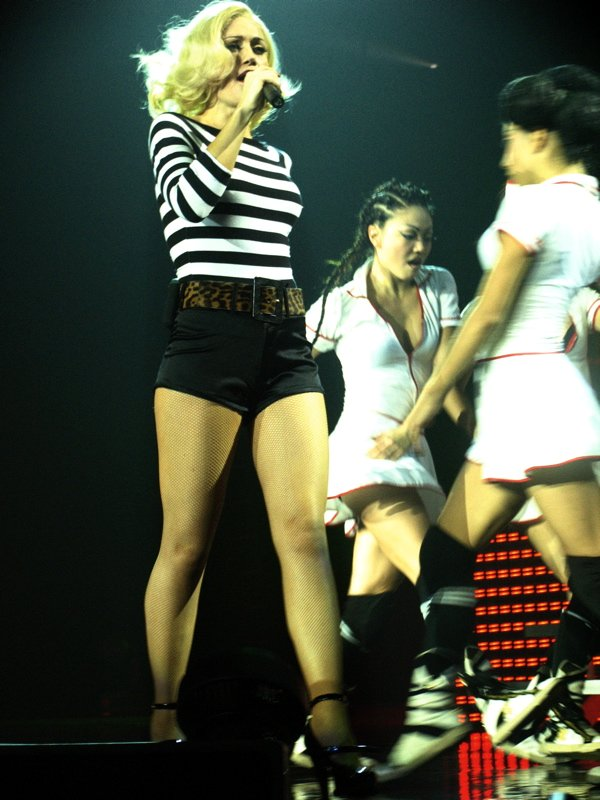
Stefani performing "Serious", a song that was originally played as an encore following "Hollaback Girl".

Stefani opened the show with the song "Harajuku Girls", an ode to Harajuku, the fashion district of Tokyo, Japan. She appeared on stage wearing a tiara and baby doll outfit, sitting in the red velvet and gold throne from the cover of the album. and surrounded by her backing dancers, also called the Harajuku Girls, while video images of Harajuku itself played on screens behind her. Her second song was the first single from the album, "What You Waiting For?", which she began as a ballad before bringing it up to its usual pace. Stefani and the Harajuku Girls then left the stage to change into one-piece bathing suits while her band continued to play, before returning to perform "The Real Thing". A group of four breakdancers came on stage to perform while Stefani left the stage again to change into a black-and-white leather tracksuit. For the next song, the album's sixth single "Crash", the audience was then divided into male and female halves and, as images of a car hood bouncing to the beat were broadcast, each half took turns to sing the lyric "back it up, back it up". Stefani then performed the fourth single from the album, "Luxurious".

Stefani changed outfits again into a pair of black hot pants to perform "Rich Girl", the album's second single, while walking along a catwalk into the crowd and giving fans high-fives. She then sang "Danger Zone" and "Long Way to Go", both intimate songs, before performing two new songs back-to-back: "Wind It Up", which would become the first single from her second album The Sweet Escape, and "Orange County Girl". "Wind It Up" was performed with a carnival vibe and "Orange County Girl" was accompanied by a video montage of childhood photos of Stefani and images of items mentioned in the song. She changed into a silver sequinned cocktail dress for the fourth single from her first album, "Cool".

In early performances of the show, Stefani's next song was "Hollaback Girl", the album's third and best-selling single, performed in a drumming costume and singing with the audience. This was followed by an encore of "Serious" and "Bubble Pop Electric", for which Stefani was brought out in a stretcher by the Harajuku Girls. However, in later performances, "Hollaback Girl" was saved for the encore and preceded by the two other songs.

== Critical response ==
Critics were divided with the Harajuku Lovers Tour. Patrick MacDonald of the Seattle Times, while applauding Stefani's song-writing efforts and the show's "frothy fun" antics, reprimanded the singer's dancing and limited material, given that she performed only twelve songs from Love. Angel. Music. Baby. and two from The Sweet Escape but none from previous work with her band No Doubt. In regards to the musical selection, MacDonald concluded that half the songs are "eminently forgettable", a view echoed by Winnipeg Sun columnist Rob Williams, who described some of the album tracks as "filler". Despite these objections, Williams issued her MTS Center performance a three-and-a-half out of five stars. "But sometimes the music didn't matter when there was as much eye candy as Stefani provided", opined the Winnipeg Sun writer. "She is an extremely striking figure and the choreography, light show, backup dancers and frequent costume changes all added to the spectacle, which ended up being more style than substance."

An amazing display of break-dancing is always a show-stopper. As is watching four beautiful women writhing about dressed as Japanese schoolgirls gone wild – and we're back to more great assets.

— Mike Ross

Mike Ross of the Edmonton Sun was impressed with Stefani's ability to engage the audience, a quality that earned her the description of the "effervescent hostess" from the journalist. In his four star review for the concert, he commended the "swell" music and "amazing" choreography; "It also had merit as a choreographic tour-de-force—thanks in large part to a quartet each of talented dancing geisha girls and B-boys", remarked Ross. Stefani's different outfits and set pieces also won praise. "So you could have enjoyed last night's concert as a fashion show. Or a music video, sure", Ross concluded. Although she called Stefani the "new princess of pop" and praised the singer's charismatic presence during the show, Jane Stevenson of the Toronto Sun felt that the concert was "definitely of the lightweight variety in the music department" and noted that, although Stefani models herself after Madonna, she is "no real threat". She gave the concert three-and-a-half stars out of five.

MTV's Corey Moss compared Stefani's performance to Madonna with regard to "the eight costume changes to the dancers to the theatrics to, hell, even the music itself" and avouched that she sounded completely different from how she did with No Doubt. Moss asserted that the No Doubt lead vocalist was the "most captivating thing onstage" with her "confident strut and dead-on vocals". Jon Pareles of The New York Times admired the "glamour and groove" antics of the show and how Stefani "flaunt[ed] the perks of stardom". He praised her music, describing the album as "a smart [record], with honed rhythm tracks that flit from funk to pop, electronics to rock", although calling most tracks "superficial", being about "style", "success", "shopping" and "sex".

Jim Harrison of LiveDaily affirmed that the tour lacked a strong musical setlist, and also felt that Stefani's stage presence was absent. He stated that she "doesn't have many songs that translate well in a live setting" from her album Love. Angel. Music. Baby. and suggested that she should have included songs by No Doubt for "much-needed shots of adrenaline" for the audience, who were, according to Harrison, "figuratively sitting on their hands and literally yawning four songs into the set". Harrison felt that Stefani seemed truly "lost on stage without a band", ultimately describing her performance as "[lacking in] energy", "lukewarm" and seemingly "on autopilot". Furthermore, the SoundSpike writer thought that her performance was akin to that of fellow American recording artist Britney Spears, which was "utterly unsuitable for both the song selection and her style". However, he did praise the rendition of "Hollaback Girl", calling it "great" and "Gwen being all Gwen can be", and called the breakdancing "pretty cool".

== Broadcast and recordings ==
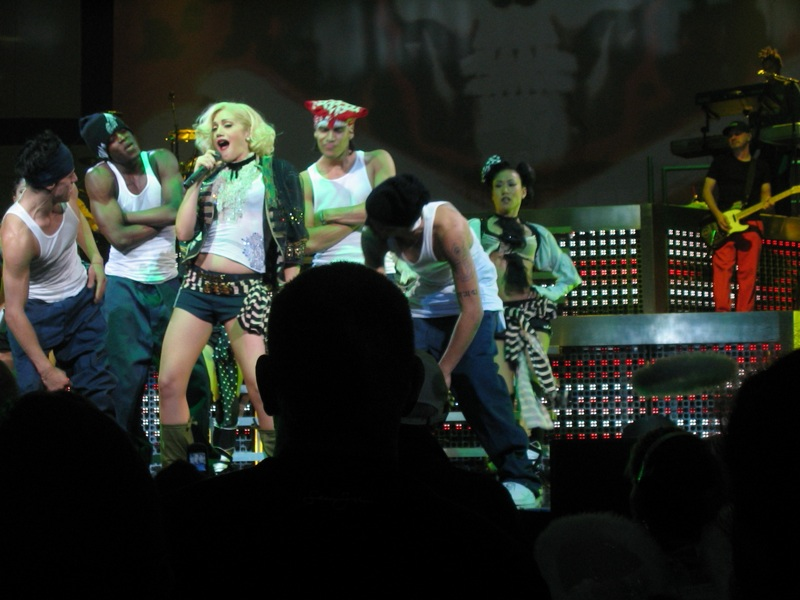
Stefani and her dancers performing "Rich Girl".

Stefani's performance in late November 2005 in her home town of Anaheim, California was recorded and released on DVD as a video album Harajuku Lovers Live. The DVD was directed by Sophie Muller. The concert features performances of all twelve songs from Love. Angel. Music. Baby. and two new songs from her second studio album, The Sweet Escape, as well as interviews with the musicians and dancers and a documentary of tour preparation. The DVD received similar mixed reviews to the concerts themselves. Reviewers praised Stefani's musical performances and stage presence, but criticizing the lack of material and the long costume changes.

The DVD was certified gold in Australia by the Australian Recording Industry Association and platinum in Canada by the Canadian Recording Industry Association.

== Personnel ==
=== Band ===
- Zachary Alford - Drums
- Gail Ann Dorsey - Bass, Guitar
- Gabrial McNair - Keyboards
- Kristopher Pooley - Keyboards, Musical Director

== Setlist ==
The following setlist was obtained from the concert held on October 21, 2005, at the Hollywood Bowl in Los Angeles, California. It does not represent all concerts for the duration of the tour.

1. "Harajuku Girls"
2. "What You Waiting For?"
3. "The Real Thing"
4. "Crash"
5. "Luxurious"
6. "Rich Girl"
7. "Danger Zone"
8. "Long Way to Go"
9. "Wind It Up"
10. "Orange County Girl"
11. "Cool"
12. "Serious"
13. "Bubble Pop Electric"
14. "Hollaback Girl"

Notes
During the later half of the tour, Stefani performed "Hollaback Girl" as the final song of the concert.

== Tour dates ==
Date	City	Country	Venue	Opening act	Attendance	Revenue
North America
October 16, 2005	Phoenix	United States	America West Arena	The Black Eyed Peas	14,155 / 14,863	$647,370
October 17, 2005	Tucson	United States	Anselmo Valencia Tori Amphitheater	The Black Eyed Peas	—N/a	—N/a
October 18, 2005	San Jose	United States	HP Pavilion at San Jose	The Black Eyed Peas	13,878 / 13,878	$713,095
October 20, 2005	San Diego	United States	Cox Arena	The Black Eyed Peas	16,320 / 18,694	$893,253
October 21, 2005	Los Angeles	United States	Hollywood Bowl	The Black Eyed Peas	16,808 / 16,808	$991,805
October 23, 2005	Sacramento	United States	ARCO Arena	The Black Eyed Peas	14,441 / 14,441	$605,510
October 25, 2005	West Valley City	United States	E Center	The Black Eyed Peas	—N/a	—N/a
October 26, 2005	Denver	United States	Magness Arena	The Black Eyed Peas	5,842 / 5,842	$389,768
October 28, 2005	Rosemont	United States	Allstate Arena	The Black Eyed Peas	14,764 / 14,764	$734,475
October 29, 2005	Auburn Hills	United States	The Palace of Auburn Hills	The Black Eyed Peas	14,074 / 14,074	$704,348
October 31, 2005	Boston	United States	TD Banknorth Garden	The Black Eyed Peas	12,083 / 14,638	$688,490
November 1, 2005	New York City	United States	Madison Square Garden	The Black Eyed Peas	25,752 / 29,254	$1,492,588
November 3, 2005	Atlantic City	United States	Borgata Events Center	—N/a	—N/a	—N/a
November 5, 2005	Fairfax	United States	Patriot Center	The Black Eyed Peas	8,541 / 8,541	$493,377
November 6, 2005	Philadelphia	United States	Wachovia Center	The Black Eyed Peas	13,538 / 15,000	$704,039
November 8, 2005	Duluth	United States	The Arena at Gwinnett Center	The Black Eyed Peas	—N/a	—N/a
November 10, 2005	Houston	United States	Toyota Center	The Black Eyed Peas	13,687 / 14,068	$701,778
November 11, 2005	Dallas	United States	American Airlines Center	The Black Eyed Peas	—N/a	—N/a
November 13, 2005	Milwaukee	United States	Bradley Center	The Black Eyed Peas	9,551 / 12,000	$485,618
November 14, 2005	Saint Paul	United States	Xcel Energy Center	The Black Eyed Peas	12,395 / 12,395	$646,899
November 16, 2005	Winnipeg	Canada	MTS Centre	M.I.A.	12,080 / 12,080	$737,803
November 18, 2005	Edmonton	Canada	Rexall Place	M.I.A.	13,543 / 13,543	$835,652
November 20, 2005	Vancouver	Canada	General Motors Place	M.I.A.	13,222 / 13,222	$818,209
November 21, 2005	Seattle	United States	KeyArena	M.I.A.	8,836 / 11,349	$484,656
November 23, 2005	Portland	United States	Veterans Memorial Coliseum	M.I.A.	—N/a	—N/a
November 25, 2005	Fresno	United States	Save Mart Center	M.I.A.	11,356 / 11,356	$558,480
November 26, 2005	Anaheim	United States	Arrowhead Pond of Anaheim	M.I.A.	24,250 / 24,250	$1,391,059
November 28, 2005	Anaheim	United States	Arrowhead Pond of Anaheim	M.I.A.	24,250 / 24,250	$1,391,059
November 29, 2005	Bakersfield	United States	Rabobank Arena	M.I.A.	9,200 / 9,200	$537,004
December 1, 2005	Oakland	United States	Oakland Arena	M.I.A.	9,818 / 14,415	$557,267
December 3, 2005	Las Vegas	United States	Aladdin Theatre for the Performing Arts	Ciara	6,922 / 6,922	$527,610
December 4, 2005	San Diego	United States	Cox Arena	Ciara	(Note: The score data is representative of the two shows at Cox Arena on October 20 and December 4 respectively.)	
December 8, 2005	Cleveland	United States	Wolstein Center	Ciara	—N/a	—N/a
December 9, 2005	Toronto	Canada	Air Canada Centre	Ciara	15,274 / 15,274	$920,972
December 11, 2005	Montreal	Canada	Bell Centre	Rihanna	8,891 / 10,000	$573,348
December 12, 2005	Uncasville	United States	Mohegan Sun Arena	Ciara	7,147 / 7,474	$375,630
December 14, 2005	Verona	United States	Turning Stone Event Center	Ciara	—N/a	—N/a
December 15, 2005	New York City	United States	Madison Square Garden	Ciara	(Note: The score data is representative of the two shows at Madison Square Garden on November 1 and December 15 respectively.)	
December 17, 2005	Columbus	United States	Value City Arena	Ciara	—N/a	—N/a
December 18, 2005	Nashville	United States	Gaylord Entertainment Center	Ciara	—N/a	—N/a
December 20, 2005	Orlando	United States	TD Waterhouse Centre	Ciara	12,000 / 12,000	$569,669
December 21, 2005	Sunrise	United States	BankAtlantic Center	Ciara	8,491 / 14,113	$451,125
TOTAL					366,859 / 394,458 (93%)	$20,230,897
