= Love. Angel. Music. Baby. =

2004 studio album by Gwen Stefani

Studio album by Gwen Stefani
- Released: November 12, 2004
- Recorded: April 2003 – March 2004
- Studios: Home Recordings (London) (Note: Tracks 1, 6, 9 and 11); Henson (Hollywood) (Note: Tracks 1, 2, 6, 9 and 11); Encore (Burbank, California) (Note: Track 2); Record One (Los Angeles); Right Track (New York City) (Note: Track 3); DARP (Atlanta) (Note: Tracks 4 and 11); O'Henry Sound (Burbank, California); Stankonia (Atlanta) (Note: Tracks 5 and 12); Larrabee East (Los Angeles) (Note: Tracks 5, 11 and 12); Soundcastle (Los Angeles); Kingsbury (Los Feliz, California) (Note: Tracks 6, 8 and 10); Flyte Tyme West at The Village (Los Angeles) (Note: Track 7)
- Genres: Electropop; dance-rock; new wave; soul
- Length: 48:27
- Label: Interscope
- Producers: André 3000; Dallas Austin; Dr. Dre; Nellee Hooper; Jimmy Jam and Terry Lewis; Tony Kanal; the Neptunes

Gwen Stefani chronology
Love. Angel. Music. Baby. (2004)	The Sweet Escape (2006)

Singles from Love. Angel. Music. Baby.
- 1. "What You Waiting For?" Released: October 4, 2004; 2. "Rich Girl" Released: December 14, 2004; 3. "Hollaback Girl" Released: March 22, 2005; 4. "Cool" Released: July 5, 2005; 5. "Luxurious" Released: October 11, 2005; 6. "Crash" Released: January 24, 2006

Love. Angel. Music. Baby. is the debut solo studio album by American singer-songwriter Gwen Stefani, released on November 12, 2004, by Interscope Records. Stefani, who had previously released five studio albums as lead singer of the rock band No Doubt, began recording solo material in early 2003. She began working on Love. Angel. Music. Baby. as a side project that would become a full album after No Doubt went on hiatus. Stefani co-wrote every song on the album, collaborating with various songwriters and producers including André 3000, Dallas Austin, Dr. Dre, Jimmy Jam and Terry Lewis, the Neptunes and Linda Perry. The album also features guest appearances by Eve and André 3000.

Designed to sound like a 1980s dance record, Love. Angel. Music. Baby. was influenced by artists and bands such as the Cure, Lisa Lisa, New Order, Prince, Depeche Mode and Madonna. The album incorporates a diverse range of genres, including electropop, dance-rock, new wave, and soul, while lyrically, it explores themes of fashion, wealth and relationships. Promotion of the album included the release of six commercially successful singles and the North American Harajuku Lovers Tour. While promoting, Stefani was often accompanied by backup dancers called the Harajuku Girls.

Love. Angel. Music. Baby. was met with generally positive reviews from music critics, and received a total of six Grammy Award nominations, including Album of the Year, during the 2006 ceremony. It debuted at number seven on the US Billboard 200, selling 309,000 copies in its first week, eventually peaking at number five. The album has received multi-platinum sales certifications in several countries and has sold over eight million copies worldwide.

== Background ==
During her time with the band No Doubt, Stefani began making solo appearances on albums by artists such as Eve. In the production of its fifth studio album, Rock Steady (2001), No Doubt collaborated with Prince, the Neptunes, and David A. Stewart and had Mark "Spike" Stent mixing the album. While the band was on tour to promote the album, Stefani listened to Club Nouveau's 1987 song "Why You Treat Me So Bad" and considered recording material that modernized 1980s music. No Doubt's bassist and her former boyfriend, Tony Kanal, introduced her to music by Prince, Lisa Lisa and Cult Jam, and Debbie Deb, and they talked about producing songs from Kanal's bedroom.

In 2003, Stefani began recording solo material. She stated she was considering recording singles to be used on soundtracks, continuing her collaborations or releasing an album under the pseudonym "GS". Jimmy Iovine (chairman and co-founder of Interscope) convinced Stefani to work on this album. On the second day of her sessions with Linda Perry, the two wrote a song about Stefani's writer's block and fears about the solo album. This became the track "What You Waiting For?", which was released as the lead single for the album.

When the two began working on a song that Stefani stated was too personal, she left to visit Kanal. He played her a track on which he had been working and which became "Crash", the album's final single. The two tried to write new material, but gave up after two weeks. They did not return to work until six months later, when Stefani began collaborating with other artists, commenting, "If I were to write the chorus of 'Yesterday' by the Beatles, and that's all I wrote, that would be good enough to be part of that history." Stefani resumed work with Linda Perry, who invited Dallas Austin, and many other artists, including Outkast's André 3000, the Neptunes, and Dr. Dre. Stefani announced the album's release in early 2004, marketing it as a "dance record" and a "guilty pleasure".

To commemorate the 15th anniversary of the album, Interscope released a version of the album remastered by Chris Gehringer on November 22, 2019.

== Composition ==
=== Music and lyrics ===
Love. Angel. Music. Baby. is an electropop, new wave, dance-rock, and soul album, incorporating elements of R&B, hip hop, and disco. The album takes influence from a variety of 1980s genres to the extent that one reviewer commented, "The only significant '80s radio style skipped is the ska punk revival that No Doubt rode to success." Several songs employ synthesizer sounds characteristic of music from the 1980s, drawing comparisons to the Go-Go's and Cyndi Lauper. Stefani cited Club Nouveau, Depeche Mode, Lisa Lisa, Prince, New Order, the Cure, and early Madonna as major influences for the album.

Like pop albums of the 1980s, Love. Angel. Music. Baby. focuses primarily on money, with songs such as "Rich Girl" and "Luxurious" that feature descriptions of riches and wealth. The album contains several references to Stefani's clothing line, L.A.M.B., and alludes to contemporary fashion designers such as John Galliano, Rei Kawakubo, and Vivienne Westwood. Stefani also released a series of dolls named the "Love. Angel. Music. Baby. Fashion Dolls", designed after the costumes from her tour. Although Stefani intended for the album to be a light dance record, she stated that "no matter what you do, things just come out." The album's opening track "What You Waiting For?" discusses her desire to be a mother and in 2006, she and her then husband, Bush singer Gavin Rossdale, had a son named Kingston Rossdale. The fourth track "Cool" discusses Stefani's friendship with Kanal after he ended a romantic relationship with her in 1995.

Love. Angel. Music. Baby. introduced the Harajuku Girls, an entourage of four Japanese women whom Stefani referred to as a figment of her imagination. The Harajuku Girls are discussed in several of the songs, including one named after and entirely dedicated to them. They appear in most of the music videos produced for the album and those for Stefani's second album The Sweet Escape (2006). Love. Angel. Music. Baby. includes various styles of music. Many songs are influenced by electro beats designed for club play. Producers Austin and Kanal incorporated R&B into the song "Luxurious" which contains a sample of the Isley Brothers' 1983 single "Between the Sheets". Jimmy Jam and Terry Lewis incorporate new jack swing, a fusion genre of R&B that the pair had developed and popularized during the mid-1980s.

=== Songs ===
"What You Waiting For?"
The album's lead single is an electropop song about Stefani's fears on a solo career.

"Hollaback Girl"
The album's best-selling single, a dance-pop song with a cheerleading motif.

"Cool"
"Cool" is a synth-pop and new wave song chronicling Stefani's previous relationship with Tony Kanal.

The album opens with "What You Waiting For?", an electropop, new wave, dance-rock, and funk song. Lyrically, the song discusses Stefani's fears of beginning a solo career. "Rich Girl", a collaboration with rapper Eve, is a dancehall and reggae reworking of the English duo Louchie Lou & Michie One's 1994 song "If I Was a Rich Girl", which itself interpolates the song "If I Were a Rich Man" from the 1964 musical Fiddler on the Roof. The Neptunes-produced track "Hollaback Girl" combines 1980s hip hop with dance music. It was written as a response to a derogatory comment that grunge musician Courtney Love made, referring to Stefani as a cheerleader.

The fourth track "Cool" chronicles Stefani's previous relationship with Tony Kanal, featuring a new wave and synth-pop production. The song was compared to Cyndi Lauper and Madonna songs from the 1980s. "Bubble Pop Electric", the fifth track, is an electro song featuring André 3000's alias Johnny Vulture. It tells of the two having sex at a drive-in movie, and it was generally well received by critics, who drew comparisons to the 1978 film Grease and its 1982 sequel Grease 2. "Luxurious" is a 1990s-inspired R&B song that lyrically talks about the desire to be rich in love, simultaneously comparing Stefani's lover with luxuries. The seventh track, "Harajuku Girls", is a synth-pop song that was described as a tribute to Tokyo's street culture, produced by Jimmy Jam and Terry Lewis.

"Crash" is an electroclash song that uses automobile metaphors to describe a relationship. "The Real Thing" was described as a vintage Europop song, and features guest appearances from New Order vocalist Bernard Sumner and bassist Peter Hook. The next track, the synth-pop song "Serious", drew comparisons to Madonna's work during the early 1980s. A music video was produced for the song, but it was never officially released, although a snippet of the video surfaced on YouTube in October 2006. "Danger Zone", an electro-rock song, was widely interpreted to be about Stefani's husband Gavin Rossdale having an illegitimate daughter; however, the song had been written before the discovery. The closing track "Long Way to Go" is an outtake from André 3000's album The Love Below (2003). The song discusses interracial dating and uses a sample of Martin Luther King Jr.'s 1963 speech "I Have a Dream".

Among the songs which didn't make the album was "Information," a track Stefani said was a response to internet culture and the misinformation that spreads when someone is famous. She described it as "a total diss on everyone."

== Promotion ==
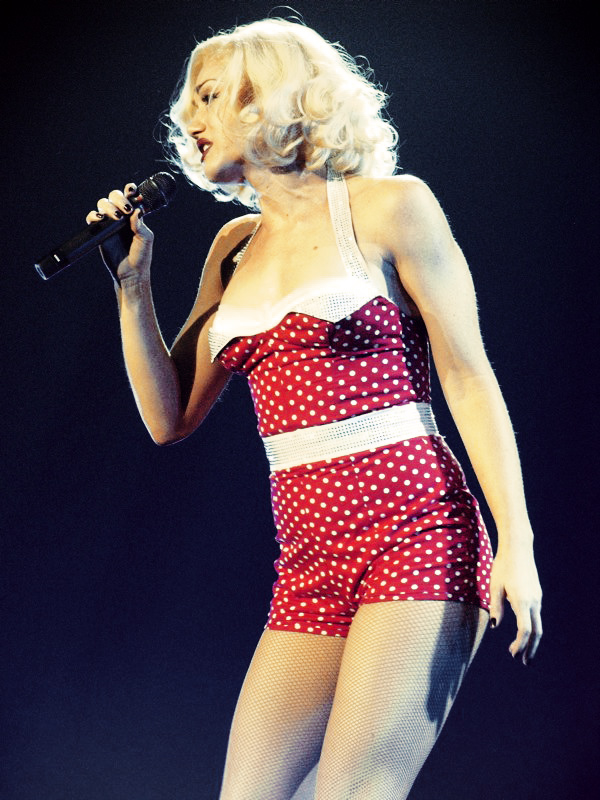
Stefani performing "The Real Thing" on the Harajuku Lovers Tour in 2005

Stefani embarked on the Harajuku Lovers Tour on October 16, 2005, to promote Love. Angel. Music. Baby. The tour consisted of only one leg, running for 42 dates across North America, ending on December 21, 2005. The hip hop group the Black Eyed Peas, rapper M.I.A., and singer Ciara accompanied Stefani as opening acts for her tour. The tour was met with varying responses from contemporary critics, who despite praising Stefani's vocals, were critical of other aspects of the show such as its musical material. According to Billboard, the tour grossed $22 million from 37 shows, 20 of which sold out. A video album of the concert titled Harajuku Lovers Live was released on DVD on December 4, 2006. Additionally, a remix EP titled Love. Angel. Music. Baby. (The Remixes) was released on November 22, 2005, including remixes of "Luxurious", "Cool", "Hollaback Girl", and "What You Waiting For?".

=== Singles ===
"What You Waiting For?" was released as the lead single from Love. Angel. Music. Baby. on October 4, 2004. The single peaked at number 47 on the Billboard Hot 100, and was commercially successful overseas, topping the chart in Australia and reaching the top 10 in several countries including France, Netherlands, New Zealand, Sweden, and the United Kingdom. "Rich Girl", featuring Eve, was released as the album's second single on December 14, 2004, becoming Stefani's first top-10 entry as a solo artist in the US when it peaked at number seven on the Billboard Hot 100. Elsewhere, the song performed equally as successfully as "What You Waiting For?". "Hollaback Girl" was released as the third single on March 15, 2005. It became the album's best-selling and most popular single, while also becoming the first single to sell one million digital copies in the US. The song topped the Billboard Hot 100 within six weeks of its release, earning Stefani her first number-one single on the chart.

"Cool" was released as the fourth single from the album on July 5, 2005. The song fared moderately on the charts, reaching the top 10 in Australia and New Zealand, as well as the top 20 in Denmark, Germany, Ireland, Norway, the UK and the US. "Luxurious" was released as the fifth single on October 11, 2005. The single version features rapper Slim Thug. The song was less successful than the previous singles from the album, peaking at number 21 on the Billboard Hot 100. "Crash" was not originally planned as a single, but due to Stefani's pregnancy, her second solo album was delayed, and the song was released as the sixth and final single from the album on January 24, 2006.

== Critical reception ==
Professional ratings
Aggregate scores
Source	Rating
Metacritic	71/100
Review scores
Source	Rating
AllMusic	4/5 stars
Entertainment Weekly	C+
The Guardian	3/5 stars
NME	8/10
Pitchfork	5.1/10
Q	4/5 stars
Rolling Stone	4/5 stars
Slant Magazine	3.5/5 stars
Stylus Magazine	C
USA Today	3/4 stars

Love. Angel. Music. Baby. received generally positive reviews from music critics. At Metacritic, which assigns a normalized rating out of 100 to reviews from mainstream publications, the album received an average score of 71, based on 22 reviews. Stephen Thomas Erlewine of AllMusic called the album "intermittently exciting and embarrassing", concluding that it is "stranger and often more entertaining than nearly any other mainstream pop album of 2004." Jennifer Nine of Yahoo! Music praised the album as "the hottest, coolest, best-dressed pop album of the year" and found it to be "sleek, shimmery, and dripping with all-killer-no-filler musical bling". Stylus Magazine's Charles Merwin opined that Stefani was a contender to fill Madonna's role, "[b]ut not enough to get seriously excited about her as the next great solo female careerist." Lisa Haines of BBC Music was more emphatic, stating that Stefani rivaled Madonna and Kelis, while dubbing the album a "stunning and stylish effort that showcases Gwen's credentials as a bonafide pop goddess."

Despite stating that Stefani "shamelessly plunders" 1980s music, Krissi Murison of the NME referred to the album as "one of the most frivolously brilliant slabs of shiny retro-pop anyone's had the chuzpah to release all year." John Murphy of musicOMH found the album "enjoyable, if patchy", but commented that it was too long. Rolling Stone's Rob Sheffield described the album as "an irresistible party: trashy, hedonistic and deeply weird." The magazine later placed the album at number 39 on its list of the top 50 albums of 2004. Robert Christgau gave the album a three-star honorable mention and wrote, "Turns out the problem wasn't ska per se—it was No Doubt." Edna Gundersen of USA Today called the album "[f]un, fizzy, frivolous", while noting that Stefani's "caffeinated electro-pop amounts to little more than sly channeling of Lisa Lisa at a disco revival." Kelefa Sanneh of The New York Times viewed it as a "clever and sometimes enticing solo debut that doesn't quite add up."

The album was generally criticized for its large number of collaborations and producers. The Guardian's Caroline Sullivan argued that although "others lend a hand [...] it's very much Stefani's show"; however, most others disagreed. Jason Damas of PopMatters compared the album to a second No Doubt greatest hits album, and Pitchfork's Nick Sylvester felt that the large number of collaborators result in sacrificing Stefani's identity on the album. Most reviewers held that the collaborations prevented the album from having a solidified sound. Eric Greenwood wrote for Drawer B that "Stefani tries to be all things to all people here", but that the result "comes off as manipulative and contrived." Entertainment Weekly's David Browne shared this opinion, stating that the album "is like one of those au courant retail magazines that resembles a catalog more than an old-fashioned collection of, say, articles."

Many reviewers focused on the album's light lyrical themes. Entertainment Weekly called the references to Stefani's clothing line "shameless" and stated that "each song becomes akin to a pricey retro fashion blurb", and Pitchfork quipped that "the Joker's free-money parade through Gotham City was a much more entertaining display of wealth, and he had Prince, not just Wendy & Lisa." Sal Cinquemani of Slant Magazine commented that the album's "fashion fetish [...] gives the album a sense of thematic cohesiveness", but the "obsession with Harajuku girls borders on maniacal". The Guardian disagreed with this perspective, arguing that "her affinity with Japanese pop culture [...] yields a synthetic sheen [...] that works well with the other point of reference, hip-hop."

=== Accolades ===
At the Billboard Music Awards, Stefani won the Digital Song of the Year award for "Hollaback Girl" and the New Artist of the Year Award, and she performed "Luxurious" with Slim Thug at the event. At the 2005 Grammy Awards, Stefani received a nomination for Best Female Pop Vocal Performance for "What You Waiting For?" and performed "Rich Girl" with Eve. At the next year's awards, Stefani received five nominations, including Album of the Year and Best Pop Vocal Album, Record of the Year and Best Female Pop Vocal Performance for "Hollaback Girl" and Best Rap/Sung Collaboration for "Rich Girl".

== Commercial performance ==
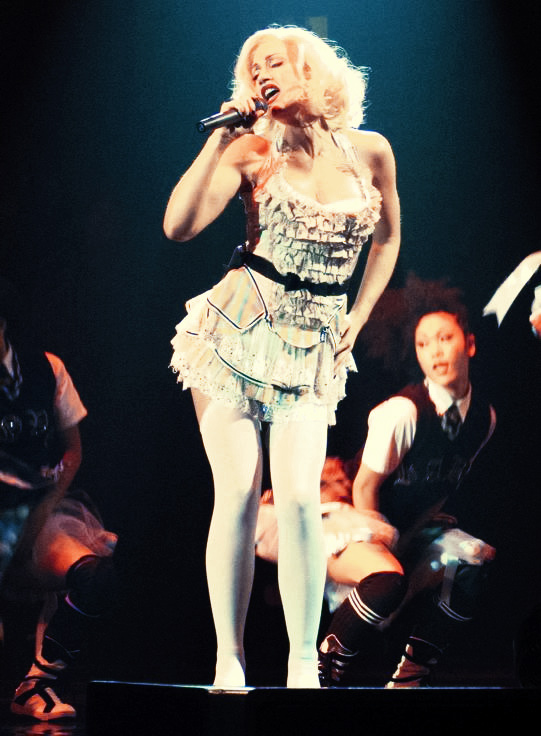
Stefani performing "What You Waiting For?" on the Harajuku Lovers Tour in 2005

Love. Angel. Music. Baby. debuted at number seven on the Billboard 200, selling 309,000 copies in its first week. On the issue dated June 18, 2005, the album climbed to a new peak position of number five with 83,000 copies sold. The Recording Industry Association of America (RIAA) certified the album quintuple platinum in March 2021, and had sold four million copies by May 2009.

The album had similar success in Europe. After entering the UK Albums Chart at number 14 with sales of 45,484 copies, Love. Angel. Music. Baby. peaked at number four in its 25th week on the chart, on May 15, 2005, selling 21,271 copies. The album was certified triple platinum by the British Phonographic Industry (BPI) on September 16, 2005, and had sold 1,068,242 copies in the United Kingdom as of March 2016. The album was listed as the 20th best-selling album of 2005 in the UK. It also reached the top 10 in Denmark, Finland, Ireland, Norway, and Sweden, and the top 20 in Austria, Belgium, France, Germany, Netherlands, and Switzerland. The International Federation of the Phonographic Industry (IFPI) certified the album platinum in May 2005, denoting sales in excess of one million copies across Europe.

In Australia, Love. Angel. Music. Baby. topped the ARIA Albums Chart for two consecutive weeks in February 2005 and spent 56 weeks on the chart. It ended 2005 as the fourth-best-selling album and was certified quadruple platinum by the Australian Recording Industry Association (ARIA) for shipments of 280,000 copies. The album peaked at number three for two non-consecutive weeks on the Canadian Albums Chart, and was certified five-times platinum by the Canadian Recording Industry Association (CRIA) in April 2006 for sales of over half a million copies. As of April 2016, Love. Angel. Music. Baby. had sold over eight million copies worldwide, and became the 12th best-selling album globally of 2005.

== Legacy ==
The success of the album's urban contemporary-oriented songs in the adult contemporary market allowed for the success of other artists while Stefani was pregnant and later recording The Sweet Escape. Nelly Furtado's third album Loose was released in June 2006 and was primarily produced by and written with hip hop producers Timbaland and Danja. Furtado's reinvention from a worldbeat singer-songwriter was to Stefani's previous forays into urban contemporary music. In his review of Loose, Rob Sheffield of Rolling Stone stated that Timbaland aimed to "produce an omnipop multiformat blockbuster in the style of [Love. Angel. Music. Baby.]—but without Gwen." The Black Eyed Peas member Fergie released her solo debut album The Dutchess in September 2006. The cholas that accompanied Fergie in some of her music videos were viewed as derivatives of the Harajuku Girls and Stefani's "Luxurious" music video. The album's lead single "London Bridge" was paralleled to "Hollaback Girl" and the third single "Glamorous" to "Luxurious". Fergie refuted accusations of piggybacking on Stefani's music, stating that "this is all so ridiculous [...] The Peas and I make music we love, and for others to speculate is their problem."

== Track listing ==
Standard edition
No.	Title	Writer(s)	Producer(s)	Length
1.	"What You Waiting For?"	Gwen Stefani; Linda Perry	Nellee Hooper	3:41
2.	"Rich Girl" (featuring Eve)	Mark Batson; Jerry Bock; Kara DioGuardi; Mike Elizondo; Eve; Sheldon Harnick; Chantal Kreviazuk; Stefani; Andre Young	Dr. Dre	3:56
3.	"Hollaback Girl"	Stefani; Pharrell Williams; Chad Hugo	The Neptunes	3:19
4.	"Cool"	Stefani; Dallas Austin	Austin; Hooper^{[a]}	3:09
5.	"Bubble Pop Electric" (featuring Johnny Vulture)	André Benjamin; Stefani; Seven Benjamin	Vulture	3:42
6.	"Luxurious"	Stefani; Tony Kanal; Ronald Isley; O'Kelly Isley; Rudolph Isley; Ernie Isley; Marvin Isley; Chris Jasper	Hooper; Kanal	4:24
7.	"Harajuku Girls"	Stefani; James Harris III; Terry Lewis; James Quenton Wright; Bobby Ross Avila; Issiah J. Avila	Jimmy Jam and Terry Lewis; Mark "Spike" Stent^{[a]}	4:51
8.	"Crash"	Stefani; Kanal	Kanal	4:06
9.	"The Real Thing"	Stefani; Perry; GMR	Hooper; Stent^{[a]}	4:12
10.	"Serious"	Stefani; Kanal	Kanal; Stent^{[a]}	4:48
11.	"Danger Zone"	Stefani; Austin; Perry	Hooper; Austin	3:37
12.	"Long Way to Go" (with André 3000)	Benjamin; Stefani	André 3000	4:34
Total length:				48:27

International edition (bonus track)
No.	Title	Length
13.	"The Real Thing" (Wendy and Lisa Slow Jam Mix)	3:35

UK edition (bonus track)
No.	Title	Length
14.	"What You Waiting For?" (Elevator Mix)	4:06

Japanese edition (bonus track)
No.	Title	Length
14.	"What You Waiting For?" (Elevator Mix)	4:06
15.	"What You Waiting For?" (music video; director's cut)

International deluxe/limited edition (bonus disc)
No.	Title	Length
1.	"What You Waiting For?" (Jacques Lu Cont's TWD Mix)	8:04
2.	"What You Waiting For?" (Jacques Lu Cont's TWD Dub)	8:21
3.	"What You Waiting For?" (live from LAUNCH.com)	3:43
4.	"Harajuku Girls" (live from LAUNCH.com)	4:37
5.	"Hollaback Girl" (Hollatronix Remix by Diplo)	2:45
6.	"Cool" (Photek Remix)	5:49
7.	"Hollaback Girl" (Dance Hollaback Remix by Tony Kanal)	6:52

=== Notes ===
- ^{^[a]} signifies an additional producer

== Personnel ==
Credits adapted from the liner notes of Love. Angel. Music. Baby.

=== Musicians ===
- Gwen Stefani – vocals
- Samuel Littlemore – programming (track 1)
- Linda Perry – guitar, keyboards (track 1)
- Rusty Anderson – additional guitar (track 1)
- Mimi (Audia) Parker – background vocals (track 1)
- Eve – vocals (track 2)
- Mike Elizondo – keyboards, guitar (track 2)
- Mark Batson – keyboards, keyboard bass (track 2)
- Rick Sheppard – MIDI (tracks 4, 11)
- Jason Lader – programming (tracks 4, 6, 9, 11)
- Tony Reyes – Line 6 guitar, bass guitar (tracks 4, 11)
- Dallas Austin – drums, keyboards (tracks 4, 11)
- André 3000 – vocals, keyboards (tracks 5, 12); programming, guitar (track 5)
- Tony Kanal – programming, keyboards, synthesizers (tracks 6, 8, 10)
- Chipz – programming (track 6)
- Aidan Love – programming (tracks 6, 9, 11)
- Simon Gogerly – programming (track 6)
- Sheldon Conrich – keyboards (track 6)
- GMR – French spoken word (track 6)
- Lee Groves – mix programming (tracks 6, 8–10); keyboards (tracks 8–10)
- James "Big Jim" Wright – keyboards (track 7)
- Jimmy Jam – bass (track 7)
- IZ – drums, percussion (track 7)
- Bobby Ross Avila – guitar, keyboards (track 7)
- Zoey – background vocals (track 7)
- Naomi Martin – background vocals (track 7)
- Wendy Melvoin – guitar (track 9)
- Lisa Coleman – keyboards (track 9)
- Peter Hook – bass (track 9)
- Greg Collins – electric guitar, slide guitar (track 9)
- Bernard Sumner – background vocals (track 9)
- Aaron Mills – bass (track 12)
- Kevin Kendricks – keyboards, piano (track 12)
- CutMaster Swiff – cuts (track 12)

=== Technical ===
- Nellee Hooper – production (tracks 1, 6, 9, 11); additional production (track 4)
- Greg Collins – engineering (tracks 1, 2, 4, 6, 9, 11); mixing (tracks 5, 12)
- Ian Rossiter – recording (track 1); engineering assistance (tracks 6, 9, 11)
- Kevin Mills – engineering assistance (tracks 1, 4–6, 9, 11, 12)
- Linda Perry – guitar recording, keyboard recording (track 1)
- Mark "Spike" Stent – mixing (tracks 1, 4, 6–11); additional production (tracks 7, 9, 10)
- David Treahearn – engineering assistance (tracks 1, 4, 6–11)
- Rob Haggett – second engineering assistance (tracks 1, 4, 6–11)
- Dr. Dre – production, mixing (track 2)
- Mauricio "Veto" Iragorri – recording (track 2)
- Francis Forde – engineering assistance (track 2)
- Brad Winslow – engineering assistance (track 2)
- Jaime Sickora – engineering assistance (tracks 2, 5, 12)
- Rouble Kapoor – engineering assistance (track 2)
- The Neptunes – production (track 3)
- Andrew Coleman – recording (track 3)
- Jason Finkel – engineering assistance (track 3)
- Phil Tan – mixing (track 3)
- Dallas Austin – production (tracks 4, 11)
- Rick Sheppard – recording, sound design (tracks 4, 11)
- Doug Harms – engineering assistance (tracks 4, 11)
- Paul Sheehy – engineering assistance (track 4)
- Cesar Guevara – engineering assistance (tracks 4, 11)
- André 3000 – production, mixing (tracks 5, 12)
- John Frye – recording (tracks 5, 12)
- Pete Novak – recording (tracks 5, 12)
- Warren Bletcher – engineering assistance (tracks 5, 12)
- Sean Tallman – engineering assistance (tracks 5, 12)
- Glenn Pittman – engineering assistance (tracks 5, 12)
- Nick Ferrero – engineering assistance (tracks 5, 12)
- John Warren – engineering assistance (track 5)
- Tony Kanal – production (tracks 6, 8, 10)
- Colin "Dog" Mitchell – recording (tracks 6, 8, 10)
- Simon Gogerly – recording (tracks 6, 9, 11)
- Jason Lader – additional engineering (track 6)
- Jimmy Jam and Terry Lewis – production (track 7)
- Matt Marrin – recording (track 7)
- Ian Cross – recording (track 7)
- Ewan Pearson – programming (tracks 9, 11)
- Brian "Big Bass" Gardner – mastering at Bernie Grundman Mastering (Hollywood, California)

=== Artwork ===
- Gwen Stefani – creative direction
- Jolie Clemens – art direction, layout
- Nick Knight – photography
- Shinjuko – illustrations
- Tomoe Ohnishi – illustration coordination
- John Copeland – logo, border and type illustrations
- Nicole Frantz – photography, art coordination
- Cindy Cooper – packaging coordination

== Charts ==
=== Weekly charts ===
Weekly chart performance for Love. Angel. Music. Baby.
Chart (2004–2005)	Peak position
Australian Albums (ARIA)	1
Austrian Albums (Ö3 Austria)	12
Belgian Albums (Ultratop Flanders)	20
Belgian Albums (Ultratop Wallonia)	33
Canadian Albums (Billboard)	3
Czech Albums (ČNS IFPI)	15
Danish Albums (Hitlisten)	10
Dutch Albums (Album Top 100)	14
European Albums (Billboard)	5
Finnish Albums (Suomen virallinen lista)	3
French Albums (SNEP)	19
German Albums (Offizielle Top 100)	11
Greek International Albums (IFPI)	3
Irish Albums (IRMA)	5
Italian Albums (FIMI)	24
Japanese Albums (Oricon)	36
Mexican Albums (Top 100 Mexico)	9
New Zealand Albums (RMNZ)	5
Norwegian Albums (VG-lista)	6
Scottish Albums (Official Charts)	5
Spanish Albums (Promusicae)	35
Swedish Albums (Sverigetopplistan)	8
Swiss Albums (Schweizer Hitparade)	17
Taiwanese Albums (Five Music)	1
UK Albums (Official Charts)	4
US Billboard 200	5

=== Year-end charts ===
2004 year-end chart performance for Love. Angel. Music. Baby.
Chart (2004)	Position
Australian Albums (ARIA)	89
UK Albums (OCC)	79
Worldwide Albums (IFPI)	36

2005 year-end chart performance for Love. Angel. Music. Baby.
Chart (2005)	Position
Australian Albums (ARIA)	4
Austrian Albums (Ö3 Austria)	44
Belgian Albums (Ultratop Flanders)	41
Belgian Albums (Ultratop Wallonia)	71
Danish Albums (Hitlisten)	53
Dutch Albums (Album Top 100)	46
European Albums (Billboard)	10
Finnish Albums (Suomen virallinen lista)	54
French Albums (SNEP)	56
German Albums (Offizielle Top 100)	31
Italian Albums (FIMI)	64
Mexican Albums (Top 100 Mexico)	48
New Zealand Albums (RMNZ)	14
Swedish Albums (Sverigetopplistan)	34
Swedish Albums & Compilations (Sverigetopplistan)	38
Swiss Albums (Schweizer Hitparade)	33
UK Albums (OCC)	20
US Billboard 200	6
Worldwide Albums (IFPI)	12

2006 year-end chart performance for Love. Angel. Music. Baby.
Chart (2006)	Position
US Billboard 200	98

=== Decade-end charts ===
Decade-end chart performance for Love. Angel. Music. Baby.
Chart (2000–2009)	Position
Australian Albums (ARIA)	49
US Billboard 200	72

=== All-time charts ===
All-time chart performance for Love. Angel. Music. Baby.
Chart	Position
US Billboard 200 (Women)	87

== Certifications and sales ==
Certifications and sales for Love. Angel. Music. Baby.
Region	Certification	Certified units/sales
Argentina (CAPIF)	Gold	20,000^{^}
Australia (ARIA)	5× Platinum	350,000^{^}
Austria (IFPI Austria)	Gold	15,000^{*}
Canada (Music Canada)	5× Platinum	500,000^{^}
Denmark (IFPI Danmark)	2× Platinum	40,000^{‡}
Finland (Musiikkituottajat)	Gold	21,944
France (SNEP)	Gold	100,000^{*}
Germany (BVMI)	Gold	100,000^{^}
Hungary (MAHASZ)	Gold	10,000^{^}
Ireland (IRMA)	3× Platinum	45,000^{^}
Italy (FIMI)	Platinum	100,000^{*}
Japan (RIAJ)	Gold	100,000^{^}
Mexico (AMPROFON)	Gold	50,000^{^}
New Zealand (RMNZ)	4× Platinum	60,000^{‡}
Norway (IFPI Norway)	Platinum	40,000^{*}
Russia (NFPF)	Platinum	20,000^{*}
Sweden (GLF)	Gold	30,000^{^}
Switzerland (IFPI Switzerland)	Gold	20,000^{^}
United Kingdom (BPI)	3× Platinum	1,068,242
United States (RIAA)	5× Platinum	5,000,000^{‡}
Summaries
Europe (IFPI)	Platinum	1,000,000^{*}
Worldwide	—	8,000,000
^{*} Sales figures based on certification alone.^{^} Shipments figures based on certification alone.^{‡} Sales+streaming figures based on certification alone.

== Release history ==
Release history for Love. Angel. Music. Baby.
Region	Date	Edition	Label	Ref.
Italy	November 12, 2004	Standard	Universal	
Netherlands	November 19, 2004	Standard	Universal	
Japan	November 21, 2004	Standard	Universal	
Australia	November 22, 2004	Standard	Universal	
France	November 22, 2004	Standard	Universal	
Germany	November 22, 2004	Standard	Universal	
United Kingdom	November 22, 2004	Standard	Polydor	
Canada	November 23, 2004	Standard	Universal	
United States	November 23, 2004	Standard	Interscope	
Sweden	November 24, 2004	Standard	Universal	
Germany	October 14, 2005	Deluxe	Universal	
Netherlands	October 21, 2005	Deluxe	Universal	
France	December 12, 2005	Deluxe	Universal	
Japan	January 18, 2006	Deluxe	Universal	
