= L.A.M.B. =

Fashion line

- Type: Corporation
- Industry: Consumer goods
- Founded: 2003
- Headquarters: United States
- Key people: Gwen Stefani
- Products: Eyewear
- Website: https://lambsun.com/

L.A.M.B. is an eyewear line by American singer Gwen Stefani, the lead vocalist of the rock band No Doubt. The line once sold apparel and fashion accessories. It was founded in 2003 and made its runway debut in 2004. The line's name is an acronym of Stefani's debut solo album Love. Angel. Music. Baby. As of 2015, the line currently focuses on eyewear.

The line was influenced by a variety of cultures' fashions, including Guatemalan, Japanese, Indian and Jamaican styles. Stefani came from a family of seamstresses. This further inspired her to launch her own fashion line. The line achieved popularity among celebrities and was worn by stars such as Teri Hatcher, Nicole Kidman, Paris Hilton and Stefani herself. The fashion line made a runway debut in the spring collection of 2004 and achieved mainstream success at New York Fashion Week in 2005. An additional fashion line, called Harajuku Lovers, was subsequently launched by Stefani.

== History ==
Stefani's first experience designing clothes came when she and her mother would sew clothes for themselves when she was young. Stefani comes from a long line of seamstresses, as even her great-grandmother would sew clothes. Stefani made most of the things she wore onstage during concerts. When she became successful and began to tour constantly, she felt she lost her way. Then she met the stylist Andrea Lieberman. Lieberman introduced her to ready-to-wear clothing. Later Lieberman became her creative consultant and Zaldy Goco took over as the head designer. Goco parted ways with L.A.M.B. in 2007.

L.A.M.B. started out as a collaboration with LeSportsac in 2003. The name L.A.M.B. is an acronym which stands for Love. Angel. Music. Baby., which is also the name of Stefani's first solo album.

== Products ==
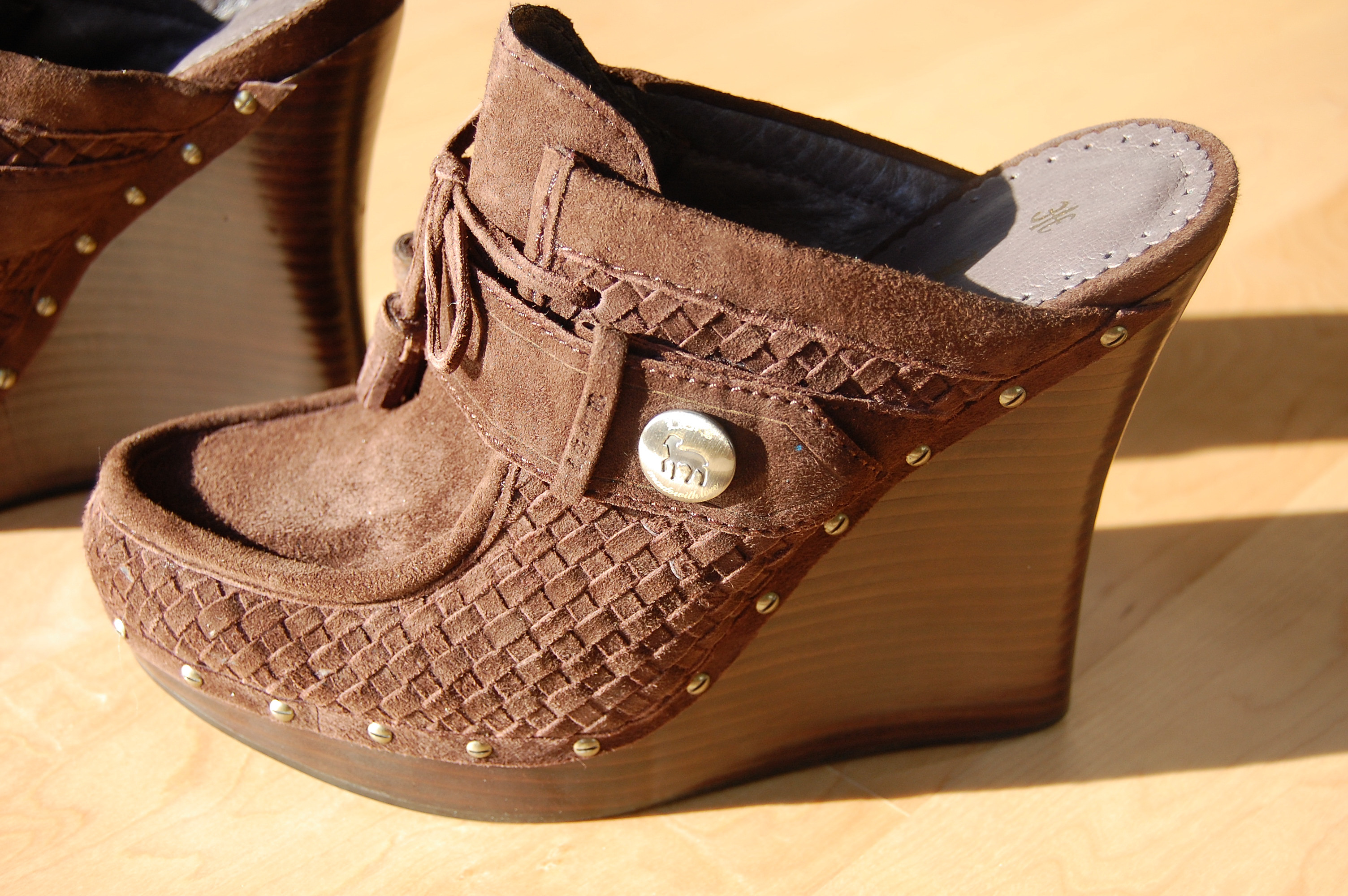
A L.A.M.B. label wedge-heel shoe

L.A.M.B joined with Royal Elastics for the shoe line. Stefani then started to widen the footwear line for adults to include boots and stilettos. L.A.M.B collaborated with Coty Inc. for the fragrance and with LeSportsac for handbags in 2003. The fragrance, "L" was launched in September 2007 at Soho House in New York City. Stefani worked with perfumer Harry Fremont to develop the scent. Stefani described the fragrance as "it's another thing you can wear and another thing I can be part of creatively. I created it for myself -- it's like me shrunk into a box." Stefani went on to design a new line of handbags with Shifter and Partners in 2006. The bags feature LeSportsac's rip-stop nylon along with a variety of antiqued metal hardware, leather trims and colorful linings. Stefani planned to design lingerie as well as make-up products for L.A.M.B. L.A.M.B. partnered with Vestal Group on a line of 39 women's watches.

L.A.M.B. products were relatively expensive, with apparel priced $55 to $1100, handbags priced $80 to $825, and watches priced $125 to $995.

An eyewear collection launched in January 2016. It won 3 of 20/20 - Vision Monday Reader's Choice awards: Frame Brand Introduced 2016, Sunglass Brand Introduced 2016 & Frame Brand – Women.

== Promotion and fashion shows ==
Just wait 'til you get your little hands on L.A.M.B.
—Stefani's song "Harajuku Girls"

Stefani frequently referred to her clothing line in her music, as one of the brand's promotional strategies. Stefani refers to her clothing line in her songs "Wind It Up," "Harajuku Girls," and "Crash" (which even incorporates the brand's slogan, "I want you all over me like L.A.M.B."). Stefani is often seen wearing her own designs, especially when making public appearances. A thirty-second commercial directed by Sophie Muller was also released to promote the brand's fragrance.

L.A.M.B. had participated in the Spring/Summer 2006, 2007, and 2008 New York Fashion Weeks. Stefani described her first line, which debuted on September 16, 2005, as "a little Sound of Music, some Orange County chola girl, some Rasta, and a bit of The Great Gatsby." The highlights of the show were purple cars bouncing using hydraulics while Stefani's song "Wind It Up" made its debut as the models walked the runway.

For Spring/Summer 2007, Stefani opted for a presentation rather than a catwalk show. The models, all donning identical blond wigs, wore designs Stefani said were inspired by Michelle Pfeiffer's role as Elvira Hancock in the 1983 Scarface. The show included some of Stefani's trademark tracksuits and extensively referenced prints from Guatemala, India, and Japan. On September 5, 2007, L.A.M.B opened New York's Spring/Summer 2008 Mercedes-Benz Fashion Week. The collection "looked like the sixties as seen by someone who grew up in the eighties" and incorporated influences from Stefani's ska roots.

== Critical reception ==
The line was mostly well received by critics and Stefani was appreciated for taking fashion seriously even though she is a celebrity. Fern Mallis of IMG praised the line and Stefani as well and said, "the L.A.M.B. line is clearly at the top of these lines and is as unique and individual as Gwen herself." The shoes were well received by the critics, though considered to be pricey. Desiree Stimpert of About.com said, " ... these shoes aren't for everyone, but will most definitely appeal to fans of Ms. Stefani's music and fashion - sense." Tim Stack of Entertainment Weekly said, "L.A.M.B.'s embellished tracksuits, Rasta-inspired knits, and gaucho-heel combos deliver the edge" Nicole Phelps of Style.com said, "The collection, which looked like the sixties as seen by someone who grew up in the eighties, was altogether more wearable and on trend." Fashion journalist Cathy Horyn of The New York Times differed and said, "If ever there was a reason for a pop star to concentrate on her vocal skills, it was Gwen Stefani's fashion meltdown."

== Commercial success ==
The brand was sold in 275 stores worldwide and was seen worn on celebrities including Teri Hatcher, Nicole Kidman, Kelly Ripa, Paris Hilton, and Stefani herself. L.A.M.B sales had expanded from $40 million in 2005 to a predicted $90 million in 2006. In March 2008, it was reported the line reached sales of $100 million. According to a Nordstrom spokesperson, the debut of L.A.M.B.'s watch line was the store's most successful watch launch ever. The brand's designs have appeared in W, Marie Claire, Elle, Lucky and InStyle.
