= Harajuku Girls =

Japanese-American group of backup dancers

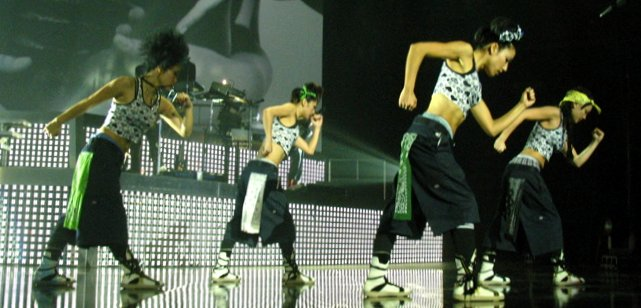
The Harajuku Girls performing on the Harajuku Lovers Tour 2005

The Harajuku Girls are four Japanese and Japanese-American backup dancers featured in stage shows and music videos for Gwen Stefani during her solo pop/dance-record career. The women also act as an entourage at Stefani's public appearances.

The Harajuku Girls are Maya Chino ("Love"), Jennifer Kita ("Angel"), Rino Nakasone ("Music") and Mayuko Kitayama ("Baby"). The name of the group is a reference to Harajuku, a neighborhood of Tokyo. The stage names of the women are derived from Stefani's Love. Angel. Music. Baby., which was the name of her first album as well as her clothing brand.

In 2014, Stefani announced she would be producing an animated series that was based on the characters Love, Angel, Music, Baby, and G, a character who was first introduced in the Harajuku Lovers perfume line. The series Kuu Kuu Harajuku follows the girls, known together as HJ5, as they fight evil and try to pursue their music.

== History ==
The Harajuku Girls were originally hired in 2004 as backup dancers for the promotion of Gwen Stefani's debut solo album Love. Angel. Music. Baby.. The "Harajuku Girls" continued to appear alongside Stefani, and were featured in the music videos for "What You Waiting For?", "Rich Girl", "Hollaback Girl", "Luxurious", "Crash", "Wind It Up", "The Sweet Escape", and "Now That You Got It". Gwen appeared on Friday Night with Jonathan Ross, and introduced the dancers as her "imaginary friends".

Three of the dancers would later appear in No Doubt's 2012 video "Settle Down".

In 2021, Angel and Music, while dressed as Love and Baby, appeared in Stefani's music video for her comeback single "Let Me Reintroduce Myself".

== Cast ==
=== Maya Chino ===
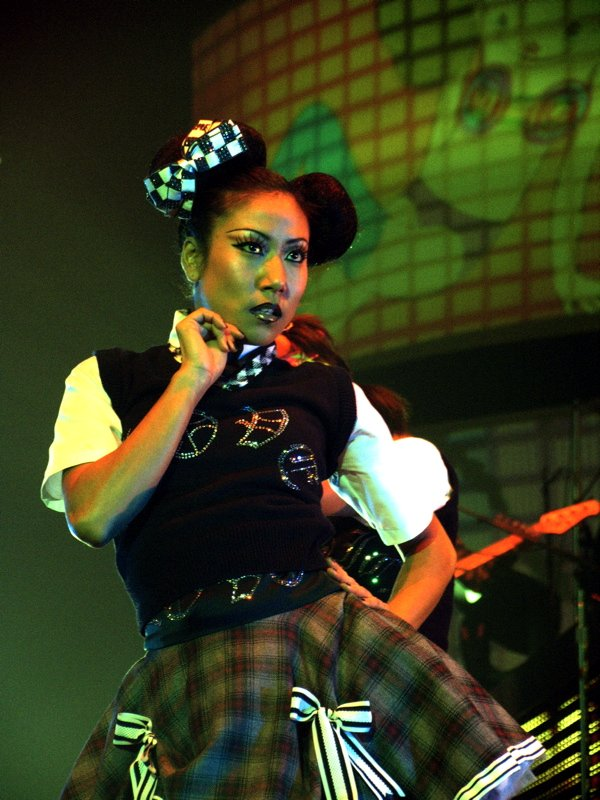
Maya Chino ("Love") during a stage performance of Harajuku Girls

Maya Chino (stage name "Love") grew up in Tokyo. She started out doing ballet when she was three years old and also tap danced. Before dancing with Gwen Stefani, she was a backup dancer for South Korean singer BoA. She later moved to Los Angeles, California, and teaches hip hop lessons to children at an academy called HORIPRO Music Academy. She is also one of the Head Instructor/Choreographers for HMA's HIPHOP Team "RIZE".

=== Jennifer Kita ===
Jennifer Kita (stage name "Angel/Lil Angel"), is a Japanese-American from Torrance, California. After graduating from South High School, Jennifer moved to San Diego and studied hip-hop at Mesa College. She later joined the dance troupe Culture Shock San Diego, where she performed for two years, then joined the hip hop entertainment company Urban FX, where she danced for a year.

Jenny's big break came when she appeared in Britney Spears' Pepsi ad campaign 'The Joy of Pepsi' in 2001 which was broadcast on television during commercial break at the Academy Awards.

After her stint with Gwen Stefani, Jenny went on to tour with Madonna on the Sticky & Sweet Tour from 2008 to 2009 and performed with various artists such as Snoop Dogg, Ricky Martin, Psy and Shakira.

=== Rino Nakasone ===
Rino Nakasone (stage name "Music"), born on June 11, 1979, grew up in Okinawa. She became interested in dance after watching music videos by Michael Jackson and Janet Jackson and mimicking their moves. At the age of nineteen she went to Los Angeles to study dance. She later taught dance at a performing arts centers, and joined an all-female dance group "Beat Freaks", which competed and was runner-up in America's Best Dance Crew. She most recently appeared in the new dance multimedia production "Siren Assassins" as Queen Jade. She was formerly married to Lee-J Razalan, the manager of Beat Freaks and a fellow dancer. She is the choreographer for famous Korean boy band Shinee with their debut song, "Replay" and various others including "Love Like Oxygen", "Juliette", "Lucifer", and "Hello" as well as choreographing Girls' Generation's "Genie", "Oh!" and "Hoot", Super Junior's "No Other", f(x)'s "Chu~♥", "NU ABO", "Gangsta Boy" and "Hot Summer", and BoA's "Dangerous" and "Copy & Paste". During 2004, she appeared as one of the back-up dancers for Britney Spears's Onyx Hotel Tour.

=== Mayuko Kitayama ===
Mayuko Kitayama (stage name "Baby"), born on February 14, 1984, grew up in Osaka. She eventually moved to New York, where she practiced in several dancing studios, after dancing in Japan for several years. Kitayama also appeared in Spear's Onyx Hotel tour with Nakasone.

== Reception ==
Asian-American entertainer and comedian Margaret Cho criticized Stefani and the group for reinforcing negative ethnic stereotypes of Asian women. Nakasone responded that Stefani was inspired by Japanese fashion culture and that she felt honored to have been in the group. In an interview in the January/February 2006 edition of Blender magazine, Cho called Stefani's Harajuku Girls a minstrel show that reinforces ethnic stereotypes of Asian women.

Writer MiHi Ahn of Salon said of Stefani's Harajuku Girls: "Stefani has taken the idea of Japanese street fashion and turned these women into modern-day geisha".

When Stefani released a new single in 2014, media publications again criticized the Harajuku Girls as Stefani's act of cultural appropriation. Eliana Dockterman from Time commented on the release of Stefani's comeback single "Baby Don't Lie" (2014), remarking that she must apologize for her "Harajuku Girls" era before fans should begin embracing her new music. She found the dancers in the troupe represented "some extremely racist stereotypes", comparing the usage of the dancers to puppetry. Regarding the backlash she received from the dancers, Stefani responded: "I get a little defensive when people [call it culture appropriation], because if we didn't allow each other to share our cultures, what would we be?" She reflected that "when ["Harajuku Girls"] first came out, I think people understood that it was an artistic and literal bow down to a culture that I was a superfan of"; Stefani also stated she was "horrif[ied]" that critics had claimed she referred to her dancers as "not real people". When asked if she regretted her use of the Harajuku Girls, Stefani responded:

No. There's always going to be two sides to everything. For me, everything that I did with the Harajuku Girls was just a pure compliment and being a fan. You can't be a fan of somebody else? Or another culture? Of course you can. Of course you can celebrate other cultures. That's what Japanese culture and American culture have done. It's like I say in the song: it's a ping-pong match. We do something American, they take it and they flip it and make it so Japanese and so cool. And we take it back and go, "Whoa, that's so cool!" That's so beautiful. It's a beautiful thing in the world, how our cultures come together. I don't feel like I did anything but share that love. You can look at it from a negative point of view if you want to, but get off my cloud. Because, seriously, that was all meant out of love.

In a 2023 interview with Allure magazine, Stefani stated that her father's job at Yamaha had him frequently traveling between California and Japan for 18 years. Speaking about her relationship with Japanese culture, she explained that "That was my Japanese influence and that was a culture that was so rich with tradition, yet so futuristic [with] so much attention to art and detail and discipline and it was fascinating to me". She had visited Harajuku as an adult and referred to herself as a "super fan" of Japanese culture. In the same interview, Stefani commented that she was Japanese and "identifies not just with Japan's culture, but also with the Hispanic and Latin communities of Anaheim, California." Her comments garnered erroneous criticism of "cultural appropriation" with interviewers and writers commenting that Stefani is Irish and Italian-American lacking Japanese ethnicity.
