= Luxurious =

2005 single by Gwen Stefani

Single by Gwen Stefani

from the album Love. Angel. Music. Baby.
- Released: October 11, 2005
- Studio: Home Recordings (London, England); Kingsbury (Los Feliz, California); Henson Recording (Hollywood, California)
- Genre: Pop; R&B
- Length: 4:24
- Label: Interscope
- Songwriters: Gwen Stefani; Tony Kanal; Ronald Isley; O'Kelly Isley, Jr.; Rudolph Isley; Ernie Isley; Marvin Isley; Chris Jasper
- Producers: Nellee Hooper; Tony Kanal

Gwen Stefani singles chronology
"Can I Have It Like That" (2005)	"Luxurious" (2005)	"Crash" (2006)

Music video
- "Luxurious" on YouTube

"Luxurious" is a song by American singer and songwriter Gwen Stefani from her debut solo studio album, Love. Angel. Music. Baby. (2004). Written by Stefani and fellow No Doubt bandmate Tony Kanal, the track contains a sample of the Isley Brothers' 1983 song "Between the Sheets".

In addition to the Isley Brothers sample, the song features use of keyboards, synthesizers, and electric guitars. "Luxurious" is a pop and R&B ballad whose lyrics describe the persona's desire to be rich in love, simultaneously comparing her lover with luxuries. The song also features Stefani's then-husband Gavin Rossdale who opens the song in French.

The song was released as the album's fifth single in October 2005 along with a remix featuring rapper Slim Thug. A music video was also released which featured Slim Thug, as well as the Harajuku Girls. The track received mixed reviews from critics, who generally found it less impressive than the previous singles. It charted within the top 40 in several countries, but had mediocre success overall and was less popular than the previous singles from Love. Angel. Music. Baby.

== Writing and development ==
Stefani had an emotional breakdown from difficulties collaborating with many other artists and songwriters, so No Doubt bassist Tony Kanal invited her to his house. Kanal had been working on a track, which later became "Crash", the sixth single from the album. However, the two were unable to write anything following that, because they had differing ideas of how the music should sound. Stefani commented that "it was just frustrating and embarrassing to sit there and think we could write songs." Six months later, the two returned to work and came up with the beginnings of a song while working in Kanal's bedroom. The two experimented with combining various melodies and including what Stefani referred to as "this really kinda fast rappy part". This was the last song she and Kanal wrote together for the album.

"Luxurious"
A 26-second sample of "Luxurious", an R&B song that samples the Isley Brothers' "Between the Sheets"

After Stefani and Kanal finished writing "Luxurious", they visited record producer Nellee Hooper, who suggested a sample of the Isley Brothers' 1983 song "Between the Sheets". The song had previously been sampled in several songs such as Da Brat's "Funkdafied" and The Notorious B.I.G.'s "Big Poppa". Stefani was reluctant to use the sample because it would mean losing some of the publishing rights to the song. Nevertheless, she decided to use it because "it sounded so amazing and meant to be".

== Composition ==
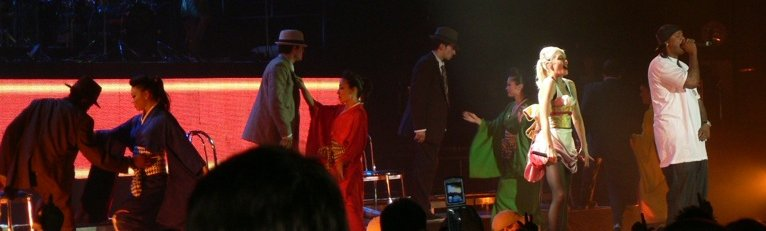
Stefani and Slim Thug (right) performing "Luxurious" on The Sweet Escape Tour

"Luxurious" is a pop and R&B ballad, whose instrumentation consists of keyboards and synthesizers. It is written in common time in the key of A minor. The song uses a descending i-vii-VI-V chord progression. The lyrics of the song include descriptions of wealth and riches, what one reviewer called "a world of Egyptian cotton, cashmere, tuberoses, and, of course, diamonds". Stefani stated that "[the] song really is more about a love relationship. If you really listen to the lyrics, it has nothing to do with money or luxury. It has to do with love, being rich in love. I just wanted to think of a clever way to express how you have to work really hard for the rewards of that." The single version of the song contains an additional verse from rapper Slim Thug for release to urban radio and clubs. The release of two further remixes, produced by Shalom "J.Storm" Miller and featuring additional verses from rapper Missy Elliott, was shelved.

The song begins with Stefani's then-husband Gavin Rossdale speaking in French and then leads into the first verse. The lyrics describe Stefani talking about "flying first class" and "livin' like a queen". She talks about being luxuriously in love and calls her lover Limousine and Treasure Chest. She talks about the increasing passion between her and her partner, and says, "Our passion it just multiplies" and "got in the fifth gear, baby". In the chorus she tells that love is getting expensive and she and her partner have to work hard night and day to be rich in love, and after working hard, when they lay back together, they get the payback. After the second verse, the song gets slower and Stefani repeats "Cha-ching, cha-ching" four times alternated with lines talking about getting "hooked up with the love" and "hydroponic love". The song ends with Rossdale speaking more lines in French.

== Critical reception ==
"Luxurious" received mixed reviews from music critics. Bill Lamb of About.com commented, "If Madonna is wishing to pass on her 'Material Girl' title, Gwen Stefani is happy to wear it proudly", but noted that "[t]hings are wearing a little thin, and this song doesn't have the striking impact of 'Rich Girl' or 'Hollaback Girl'." Sam Shepherd of musicOMH agreed, writing that "'Luxurious' is by no means a bad song, but it is pretty ordinary when compared to the songs that have preceded it." PopMatters' Jason Damas found the track uninteresting and stated that Rossdale's appearance "sounds like a blinged-out Saint Etienne". Alex Lai from Contactmusic.com called Stefani's performance "as seductive as ever, and the production extremely polished, but it lacks the infectiousness of her other releases"; he found Slim Thug's remix unnecessary and viewed the single's release as "a money-spinning exercise".

Laura Heaps from MyVillage agreed, stating that the single "just doesn't stand out" and that Stefani "doesn't do hip hop as well as she does quirky pop", and Playlouder's Richard Smirke described the track as a "sickly sweet R&B ballad". Sal Cinquemani of Slant Magazine called the lyrics "surprisingly sharp"; Nick Sylvester of Pitchfork Media disagreed, dubbing the song a "soulless Nellee Hooper 90s R&B vanity affair" and a "zombied buy-LAMB-clothing mantra". In August 2013, Complex magazine placed "Luxurious" at number 19 on its list of "The Best R&B Songs by White Singers in the 2000s".

== Commercial performance ==
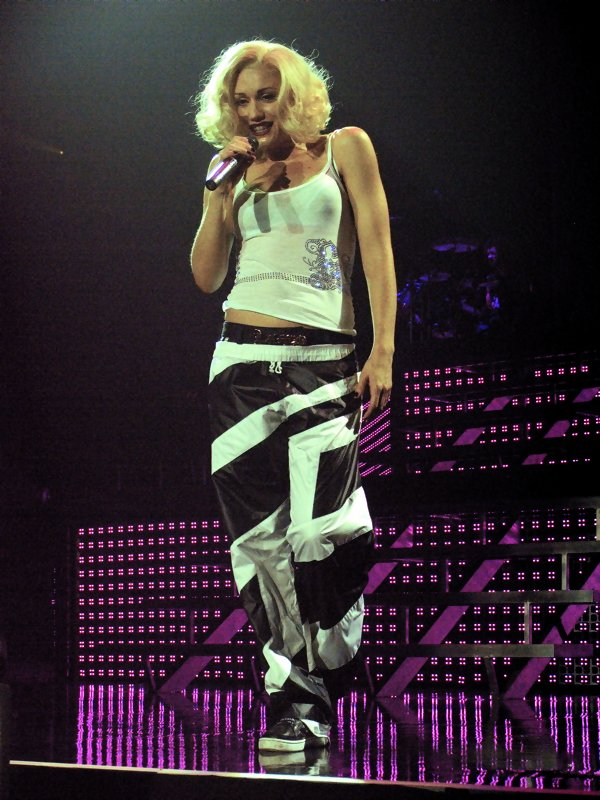
Stefani performing "Luxurious" on the Harajuku Lovers Tour

In the United States, "Luxurious" debuted on the Billboard Hot 100 at number 80 on the issue dated November 5, 2005. It failed to reach the top 20, peaking at number 21 five weeks later, and remained on the chart for 20 weeks. It performed better on the pop-oriented charts, reaching number three on the Pop 100 chart, number 10 on the Mainstream Top 40 chart, and number 37 on the Adult Top 40 chart. The track also had some crossover success, charting at number nine on the Rhythmic Top 40 chart and number 33 on the Hot R&B/Hip-Hop Songs chart. In Canada, the single was released to radio on October 25, 2005, peaking at number 10 on the Canadian Singles Chart in its sixth week on the chart.

The song was released on December 5, 2005, in the United Kingdom and Australia. It received very little promotion in the UK and continued the trend of Stefani's lower-charting singles since "Hollaback Girl" when it debuted at number 44 on the UK Singles Chart, spending three weeks on the chart. The single performed similarly throughout Europe, where it reached the top 40 in Ireland, Italy, the Netherlands, and Switzerland, but generally did not reach the top 30. It did particularly well in Finland, where it charted at number two, becoming the highest-peaking single of Stefani's solo career in that country, although it spent only two weeks on the chart. Stefani's previous four singles had been successful in Australia, where all reached the top 10; however, "Luxurious" did not reach the top 20 and reached a peak of number 25. In New Zealand, "Luxurious" was moderately successful, where it reached number 17 but stayed on the chart for only 10 weeks.

== Music video ==
The music video for "Luxurious" was directed by Sophie Muller. In the video, Stefani plays a chola in high school. Then Stefani, accompanied by her Harajuku Girls, receive a manicure at a beauty salon while various couples kiss in their seats and check their cellphones. In the next sequence, she's styling her hair and applying cosmetics in front of a mirror while her roommates along with the Harajuku girls dance behind her and a couple makeout on the bed. She then applies rhinestones near her eyes, lip-liner, mascara and shows off gold jewelry with her name carved on it. During his rap, Slim Thug appears in sequences with either Stefani or two Harajuku Girls. It concludes with Stefani joining her friends in a block party, where they celebrate with breakdancing and a barbecue. The video is intercut with sequences of Stefani breaking open piñatas and lying on a candy-covered floor, styled in a fashion resembling Mexican painter Frida Kahlo.

Stefani had generally developed music video concepts while writing the song, but since she had not expected "Luxurious" to become a single, she had not given much thought to a music video for the song. The image she had for her persona was a high school girl named Mercedes, who she described as "very inspiring":

She's this total like chola girl, white face, and she used to sit in class and put on tons of makeup. And I used to just watch her, mesmerized. And she would just wear this dark liner and this red lipstick and she had this safety pin and she'd be picking her eyelashes apart. She hadn't taken that mascara off for months.

Stefani called Muller, who had directed several videos for Stefani and No Doubt, to direct the music video. Muller did not understand Stefani's vision for the video, so Stefani became involved in developing ideas for the video.

The video had limited success on music video programs. On MTV's Total Request Live, the video debuted on October 25, 2005, at number 10. It peaked at number seven and left the countdown after only five days. After its October 21 debut on MuchMusic's Countdown, it peaked nine weeks later at number 11, remaining on the chart for 13 weeks. The video was featured on an episode of MuchMusic's Video on Trial, where the reviewers found it a superficial attempt to market to various races.

== Track listings ==
- Canadian and European 2-track CD single
1. "Luxurious" (Album Version) – 4:24
2. "Luxurious" (Remix featuring Slim Thug) [This Is How We Roll Edit] – 4:04
- Australian and European CD maxi-single
1. "Luxurious" (Album Version) – 4:24
2. "Luxurious" (Remix featuring Slim Thug) [This Is How We Roll Edit] – 4:04
3. "Cool" (Richard X Remix) – 6:37
4. "Luxurious" (Video) – 4:06
- US 12-inch vinyl single

A1. "Luxurious" (Remix featuring Slim Thug) – 4:22
A2. "Luxurious" (Album Version) – 4:24
B1. "Luxurious" (Acapella) – 3:42
B2. "Luxurious" (Instrumental) – 4:24

Some vinyl copies accidentally have the Slim Thug remix twice on side A.

== Personnel ==
Personnel are adapted from the liner notes of Love. Angel. Music. Baby.

- Gwen Stefani – lead vocals, songwriting
- Chipz – programming
- Greg Collins – recording
- Sheldon Conrich – keyboards
- Brian "Big Bass" Gardner – mastering
- GMR – French spoken word
- Simon Gogerly – programming, recording
- Lee Groves – mix programming
- Rob Haggett – second assistant engineer
- Nellee Hooper – production
- Tony Kanal – keyboards, production, programming, songwriting, synthesizers
- Jason Lader – additional engineering, programming
- Aidan Love – programming
- Kevin Mills – assistant engineering
- Colin "Dog" Mitchell – recording
- Ian Rossiter – assistant engineering
- Mark "Spike" Stent – mixing
- David Treahearn – assistant engineering

== Charts ==
Weekly chart performance for "Luxurious"
Chart (2005–2006)	Peak position
Australia (ARIA)	25
Austria (Ö3 Austria Top 40)	66
Belgium (Ultratip Bubbling Under Flanders)	6
Belgium (Ultratip Bubbling Under Wallonia)	8
Canada (Nielsen SoundScan)	10
Canada CHR/Pop Top 30 (Radio & Records)	7
Finland (Suomen virallinen lista)	2
Germany (GfK)	65
Greece (IFPI Greece)	14
Hungary (Editors' Choice Top 40)	39
Ireland (IRMA)	34
Italy (FIMI)	31
Netherlands (Dutch Top 40)	31
New Zealand (Recorded Music NZ)	17
Scottish Singles Sales (Official Charts)	51
Switzerland (Schweizer Hitparade)	39
UK Singles (Official Charts)	44
UK Hip Hop/R&B (Official Charts)	7
US Billboard Hot 100	21
US Adult Pop Airplay (Billboard)	37
US Hot R&B/Hip-Hop Songs (Billboard)	33
US Pop Airplay (Billboard)	10
US Pop 100 (Billboard)	13
US Rhythmic Airplay (Billboard)	9

== Certifications ==
Certifications for "Luxurious"
Region	Certification	Certified units/sales
New Zealand (RMNZ)	Platinum	30,000^{‡}
United States (RIAA)	Platinum	1,000,000^{‡}
^{‡} Sales+streaming figures based on certification alone.

== Release history ==
Release dates and formats for "Luxurious"
Region	Date	Format(s)	Label(s)	Ref.
United States	October 11, 2005	Contemporary hit radio	Interscope	
Australia	December 5, 2005	CD	Universal Music Australia	
United Kingdom	December 5, 2005	CD	Interscope	
