= Crash (Gwen Stefani song) =

2006 single by Gwen Stefani

Single by Gwen Stefani

from the album Love. Angel. Music. Baby.
- Released: January 24, 2006
- Studio: Kingsbury (Los Feliz, California)
- Genre: Electroclash
- Length: 4:06
- Label: Interscope
- Songwriters: Gwen Stefani; Tony Kanal
- Producer: Tony Kanal

Gwen Stefani singles chronology
"Luxurious" (2005)	"Crash" (2006)	"Wind It Up" (2006)

Music video
- "Crash" on YouTube

"Crash" is a song by American singer and songwriter Gwen Stefani from her debut solo studio album, Love. Angel. Music. Baby. (2004). Written by Stefani and No Doubt bandmate Tony Kanal, the song uses automobile metaphors to describe a relationship, and it received mixed to positive reviews from critics. Not originally planned as a single, the song was released as the album's sixth and final single on January 24, 2006, during Stefani's pregnancy.

== Background and writing ==
Stefani had been working on her solo project with Linda Perry. The two penned several songs, including lead single "What You Waiting For?", but Stefani found the process difficult, commenting, "It's humiliating and intimidating even if they're sweet and excited, because you're drowning in their creativity." When the two began working on a song about a deceased friend of Stefani's, Perry began writing the lyrics and Stefani, feeling that Perry was encroaching on her territory, broke down and left.

"Crash"
The song has an automobile theme.

Stefani's No Doubt bandmate Tony Kanal invited her to his house so that the two could go out with friends. When she arrived, however, Kanal surprised her by playing some tracks on which he had been working and revealed that he had prepared some for Stefani. Although Stefani had wanted to work with Kanal, she was concerned that his work would not fit with her dance-oriented album; however, she called it her "favorite track that [she had] written so far", and the two worked on the track, modeling it after hip hop trio Salt-n-Pepa.

== Critical reception ==
"Crash" received mixed reviews from critics. In a review for The New York Times, Kelefa Sanneh noted that the track "successfully conjure[s] up the infectious spirit of early Madonna." David Browne of Entertainment Weekly called the song "a pricey retro fashion blurb" on which Stefani appears as "an old-school, gold-chained rapper". Krissi Murison of NME disagreed, calling it one of "the best bits of the decade of decadence" and referring to it as "Salt-N-Pepa's cartoon rap". Jason Shawhan of About.com stated that the song's "great Narada Michael Walden bleepy synth noises [...] pop out of the mix like the car stereo just decided to sing along", and Jennifer Nine of Yahoo! Music commented that the track had "icy-cool schoolyard sass".

Eric Greenwood of Drawer B opined that the track "carelessly revisits Stefani's blatant fondness for 80's pop, but not even [...] Tony Kanal can save her from lifeless retreads like these." The Washington Post reviewer Sean Daly compared it to Salt-n-Pepa's 1987 single "Push It" and added that Stefani "pushes it real good". PopMatters's Jason Damas gave it a very strong review, writing that "Stefani nails all the vocal mannerisms" and that Kanal "reveals a major mainstream pop jones here, especially in the way he layers the cut [...] with dozens of orchestra hits [...] which have been absent from almost all pop albums for a decade or more now." Sal Cinquemani of Slant Magazine gave the song a mixed review, stating that it "features some near-fatal car metaphors" but that Stefani "maintains her signature sass throughout".

== Release and commercial performance ==
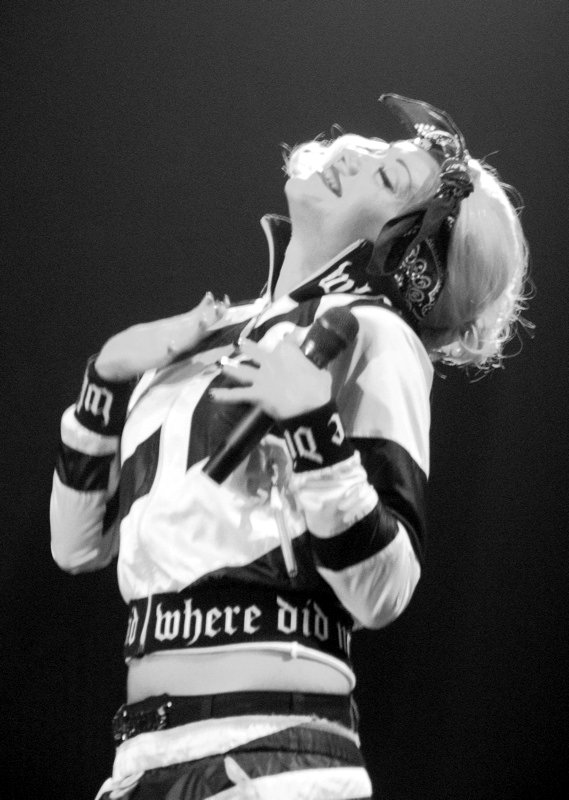
Stefani wore a L.A.M.B. racecar-style tracksuit for performances of "Crash" on the Harajuku Lovers Tour

"Crash" had originally not been planned as a major single release from Love. Angel. Music. Baby. In late 2005 Stefani announced that she was pregnant (while performing the song on tour in Fort Lauderdale, Florida) and would be delaying her second solo album, and the song was announced as the sixth single in January 2006. The song impacted US contemporary hit radio and rhythmic contemporary radio stations in the US on January 24, 2006.

The single debuted at number 95 on the Billboard Hot 100 on February 11, 2006. It reached number 49 for two weeks and remained on the chart for a total of eight weeks. "Crash" was somewhat more successful on the pop charts, reaching number 20 on the Top 40 Mainstream and number 28 on the Pop 100, and had some crossover success, reaching number 38 on the Rhythmic Top 40.

"Crash" was the only single from Love. Angel. Music. Baby. that did not receive a CD single release in Canada; in addition, the track experienced minimal radio success, peaking at number 87 on the BDS Airplay Chart in March 2006.

Due to Stefani's pregnancy, a live music video was released instead of a narrative video. The video was directed by Sophie Muller at a performance in Anaheim, California, during Stefani's Harajuku Lovers Tour.

== Personnel ==
Personnel are adapted from the liner notes of Love. Angel. Music. Baby.

- Gwen Stefani – lead vocals, songwriting
- Brian "Big Bass" Gardner – mastering
- Lee Groves – keyboards, mix programming
- Rob Haggett – second assistant engineer
- Tony Kanal – keyboards, production, programming, songwriting, synthesizers
- Colin "Dog" Mitchell – recording
- Mark "Spike" Stent – mixing
- David Treahearn – assistant engineering

== Charts ==
Weekly chart performance for "Crash"
Chart (2006)	Peak position
Canada CHR/Pop Top 30 (Radio & Records)	20
Global Dance Tracks (Billboard)	39
US Billboard Hot 100	49
US Pop 100 (Billboard)	28
US Pop Airplay (Billboard)	20
US Rhythmic Airplay (Billboard)	38

== Release history ==
Release dates and formats for "Crash"
Region	Date	Format	Label	Ref.
United States	January 24, 2006	Contemporary hit radio	Interscope	
United States	January 24, 2006	Rhythmic contemporary radio	Interscope	
