= List of awards and nominations received by Gwen Stefani =

Gwen Stefani awards and nominations
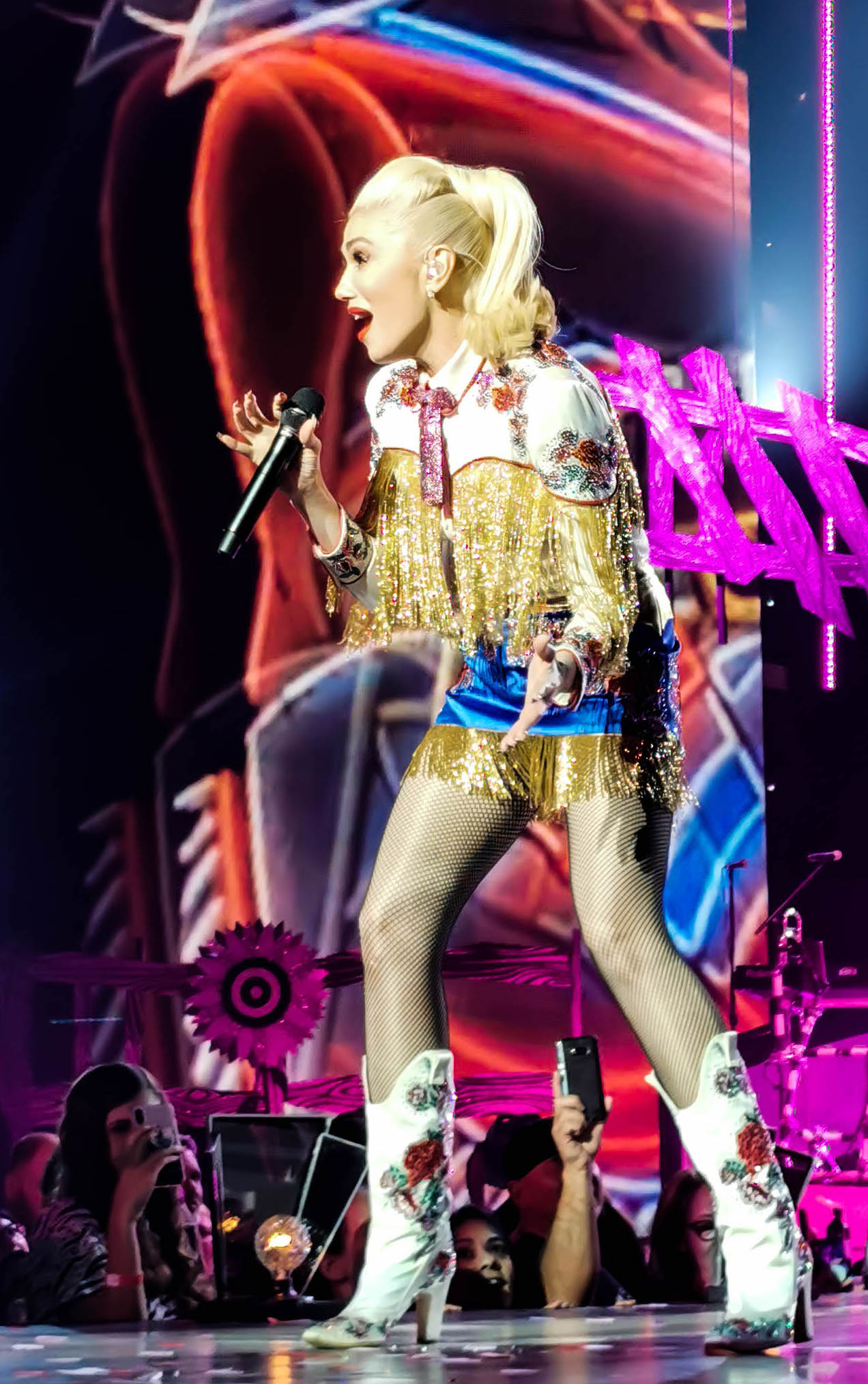
- Stefani performing at her concert residency Just a Girl at the Zappos Theater in Las Vegas
Awards and nominations
Award	Wins	Nominations
American Music Awards	1	2
Billboard	2	3
Brit	1	1
Grammy	3	18
MTV VMA	5	12
People's Choice	2	2
Teen Choice	5	12
World Music	1	3

Totals (Note: Certain award groups do not simply award one winner. They acknowledge several different recipients, have runners-up, and have third place. Since this is a specific recognition and is different from losing an award, runner-up mentions are considered wins in this award tally. For simplification and to avoid errors, each award in this list has been presumed to have had a prior nomination.)
- Wins: 57
- Nominations: 138

Gwen Stefani is an American singer and song writer. She is a member of the rock band No Doubt, whose 1995 album Tragic Kingdom propelled them to stardom and sold 17 million copies worldwide. Before her solo debut, Stefani collaborated with other artists on their albums, including "South Side" with Moby and "Let Me Blow Ya Mind" with Eve and received a Grammy for best rap. Stefani has released three solo studio albums, with Interscope Records: Love. Angel. Music. Baby. (2004), The Sweet Escape (2006) and This is what the truth feels like (2016) . After the success of her first album, Stefani commented, "All I wanted to do was make a dance record. [...] Not even that — a stupid dance record." Several of her songs have appeared on the Billboard Hot 100 charts, including "Hollaback Girl" which peaked at number one and "The Sweet Escape" at number two.

Stefani's only Grammy Award as a solo artist is the award for Best Rap/Sung Collaboration for the song "Let Me Blow Ya Mind" in 2002. She won two MTV Video Music Awards in 2005, including Best Choreography for "Hollaback Girl" and Best Art Direction for "What You Waiting For?" At the Teen Choice Awards, Stefani won all four nominations that she received, including Choice Breakout, Best Female Video, and Choice Collaboration for "Rich Girl". Also, she was named the World's Best New Female Artist at the World Music Awards in 2005. Overall, Stefani has received 49 awards from 126 nominations.

== Academy of Country Music Awards ==
The Academy of Country Music Awards is an annual awards ceremony created by the Academy of Country Music in 1966. Stefani has received one nomination.

Year	Nominee / work	Award	Result
2021	"Nobody but You" (with Blake Shelton)	Music Event of the Year	Nominated

== American Music Awards ==
The American Music Awards is an annual awards ceremony created by Dick Clark in 1973. Stefani has received one award from two nominations.

Year	Nominee / work	Award	Result
2005	Gwen Stefani	Favorite Pop/Rock Female Artist	Won
2005	Gwen Stefani	Artist of the Year	Nominated
2020	"Nobody but You" (with Blake Shelton)	Favorite Song - Country	Nominated

== ASCAP Pop Music Awards ==
Year	Nominee / work	Award	Result
2006	"Hollaback Girl"	Most Performed Songs	Won
2006	"Rich Girl"	Most Performed Songs	Won
2007	"Cool"	Most Performed Songs	Won
2008	"The Sweet Escape"	Most Performed Songs	Won
2008	"The Sweet Escape"	Song of the Year	Won

== BMI Music Awards ==
Year	Nominee / work	Award	Result
2006	"Hollaback Girl"	Pop Songs	Won
2006	"Rich Girl"	Pop Songs	Won
2007	"Cool"	Pop Songs	Won
2008	"The Sweet Escape"	Pop Songs	Won

== Billboard Music Awards ==
Year	Nominee / work	Award	Result
2005	"Hollaback Girl"	Digital Song of the Year	Won
2005	"Hollaback Girl"	Hot 100 Song of the Year	Nominated
2005	Gwen Stefani	New Artist of the Year	Won

== Bravo A-List Awards ==
Year	Nominee / work	Award	Result
2009	Gwen Stefani	Style Female	Won
2009	Gwen Stefani	Celebrity Designer	Won

== BRIT Awards ==
The BRIT Awards are the British Phonographic Industry's annual pop music awards. Gwen Stefani has won one award from one nominations.

Year	Nominee / work	Award	Result
2005	Gwen Stefani	International Female Solo Artist	Won

== California Music Awards ==
Year	Nominee / work	Award	Result
1998	Gwen Stefani	Outstanding Female Vocalist	Won
2003	Gwen Stefani	Outstanding Female Vocalist	Won
2004	Gwen Stefani	Outstanding Female Vocalist	Won

== CMT Music Awards ==
Year	Nominee / work	Award	Result
2020	"Nobody but You" (with Blake Shelton)	Collaborative Video of the Year	Won

== D&AD Awards ==
Design and Art Direction (D&AD) is a British educational charity which exists to promote excellence in design and advertising.

Year	Nominee / work	Award	Result
2006	"Cool"	Cinematography	Wood Pencil

== ECHO Music Awards ==
Year	Nominee / work	Award	Result
2006	Gwen Stefani	International Pop/Rock Female Artist of the Year	Nominated

== Glamour Women of the Year Awards ==
Year	Nominee / work	Award	Result
2005	Gwen Stefani	Best Solo Artist	Won
2016	Gwen Stefani	The Icon	Won

== Grammy Awards ==
The Grammy Awards are awarded annually by the National Academy of Recording Arts and Sciences of the United States. Stefani has won 3 awards from 18 nominations, both as a solo artist and member of No Doubt. Every award is individually assigned to each member of the group.

Year	Nominee / work	Award	Result
1997	Tragic Kingdom	Best Rock Album	Nominated
1997	No Doubt	Best New Artist	Nominated
1998	"Don't Speak"	Best Pop Performance by a Duo or Group with Vocals	Nominated
1998	"Don't Speak"	Song of the Year	Nominated
2001	Return of Saturn	Best Rock Album	Nominated
2002	"Let Me Blow Ya Mind" (with Eve)	Best Rap/Sung Collaboration	Won
2003	"Hey Baby"	Best Pop Performance by a Duo or Group with Vocals	Won
2003	Rock Steady	Best Pop Vocal Album	Nominated
2003	"Hella Good"	Best Dance Recording	Nominated
2004	"Underneath It All"	Best Pop Performance by a Duo or Group with Vocals	Won
2005	"It's My Life"	Best Pop Performance by a Duo or Group with Vocals	Nominated
2005	"What You Waiting For?"	Best Female Pop Vocal Performance	Nominated
2006	"Hollaback Girl"	Record of the Year	Nominated
2006	"Hollaback Girl"	Best Female Pop Vocal Performance	Nominated
2006	Love. Angel. Music. Baby.	Album of the Year	Nominated
2006	Love. Angel. Music. Baby.	Best Pop Vocal Album	Nominated
2006	"Rich Girl" (with Eve)	Best Rap/Sung Collaboration	Nominated
2008	"The Sweet Escape" (with Akon)	Best Pop Collaboration with Vocals	Nominated

== Hungarian Music Awards ==
The Hungarian Music Awards (Golden Giraffe Awards, before 2004) is an annual award ceremony held by the Hungarian music industry association Mahasz since 1992.

Year	Nominee / work	Award	Result
2006	Love. Angel. Music. Baby.	International Pop-Rock Album of the Year	Won

== IFPI Platinum Europe Awards ==
Year	Nominee / work	Award	Result
2005	Love. Angel. Music. Baby.	Album Title	Won

== Ibiza Music Video Festival ==
Year	Nominee / work	Award	Result
2016	"Misery"	Best Hair & Make Up	Won
2016	"Misery"	Best DOP	Nominated

== iHeartRadio Music Awards ==
Year	Nominee / work	Award	Result
2021	“Nobody but You” (with Blake Shelton)	Country Song of the Year	Nominated

== International Dance Music Awards ==
Year	Nominee / work	Award	Result
2005	"What You Waiting For?"	Best Alternative/Rock Dance Artist	Won
2006	Gwen Stefani	Best Dance Solo Artist	Nominated

== JUNO Awards ==
Year	Nominee / work	Award	Result
2006	Love. Angel. Music. Baby.	International Album of the Year	Nominated

== Meteor Ireland Music Awards ==
Year	Nominee / work	Award	Result
2006	Gwen Stefani	Best International Female	Won

== MTV Awards ==
=== MTV Video Music Award ===
The MTV Video Music Awards is an annual awards ceremony established in 1984 by MTV. Stefani has received four awards from twelve nominations.

Year	Nominee / work	Award	Result
2001	"South Side"	Best Male Video	Won
2001	"Let Me Blow Ya Mind"	Best Female Video	Won
2001	"Let Me Blow Ya Mind"	Best Hip-Hop Video	Nominated
2001	"Let Me Blow Ya Mind"	Viewer's Choice	Nominated
2005	"Hollaback Girl"	Best Choreography	Won
2005	"Hollaback Girl"	Video of the Year	Nominated
2005	"Hollaback Girl"	Best Female Video	Nominated
2005	"Hollaback Girl"	Best Pop Video	Nominated
2005	"What You Waiting For?"	Best Art Direction	Won
2005	"What You Waiting For?"	Best Editing	Nominated
2007	"The Sweet Escape"	Most Earthshattering Collaboration	Nominated.

=== MTV Asia Awards ===
MTV Asia Awards was another annual award by MTV which were awarded from 2002 to 2008.

Year	Nominee / work	Award	Result
2008	Gwen Stefani	Innovation Award	Nominated

=== MTV Europe Music Awards ===
Year	Nominee / work	Award	Result
2005	Love. Angel. Music. Baby	Album of the Year	Nominated
2005	"Gwen Stefani"	Best Female	Nominated
2005	"Gwen Stefani"	Best Pop	Nominated
2005	"What You Waiting For?"	Best Video	Nominated

=== MTV Immies ===
Year	Nominee / work	Award	Result
2005	Gwen Stefani	Best International Debut	Won

=== MTV Video Music Japan Awards ===
Year	Nominee / work	Award	Result
2005	"What You Waiting For?"	Best Pop Video	Nominated
2006	"Hollaback Girl"	Best Pop Video	Nominated
2007	"Wind It Up"	Best Female Video	Nominated

=== MTV TRL Awards ===
Year	Nominee / work	Award	Result
2005	Gwen Stefani	TRL's 1st Lady Award	Nominated
2005	"What You Waiting For"	Best Performance	Nominated

=== MTV Video Music Latino America Awards ===
Year	Nominee / work	Award	Result
2005	Gwen Stefani	Best New International Artist	Nominated
2005	Gwen Stefani	Best Pop International Artist	Won
2007	Gwen Stefani	Best Pop International	Nominated

=== MTV Australia Music Awards ===
Year	Nominee / work	Award	Result
2005	Gwen Stefani	Best Female	Nominated
2005	Gwen Stefani	Best Dressed	Won
2005	"What You Waiting For"	Video of the Year	Nominated
2005	"What You Waiting For"	Best Pop Video	Nominated
2007	"Wind It Up"	Best Female	Nominated
2007	"Wind It Up"	Best Pop Video	Nominated

== Much Music Video Awards ==
Year	Nominee / work	Award	Result
2005	"Rich Girl"	People's Choice: Favourite International Artist	Won
2005	"What You Waiting For?"	Best International Video – Artist	Nominated
2007	"The Sweet Escape"	Best International Video - Artist	Nominated
2007	"The Sweet Escape"	People's Choice: Favourite International Artist	Nominated
2015	"Spark the Fire"	Funniest Video of the Year	Nominated

== My VH1 Music Awards ==
Year	Nominee / work	Award	Result
2001	"What's Going On"	There's No "I" in Team (Best Collaboration)	Won
2001	Gwen Stefani	Female Singer	Won
2001	Gwen Stefani	Navel Academy	Nominated
2001	"Let Me Blow Ya Mind"	There's No "I" In Team (Best Collaboration)	Nominated
2001	"South Side"	There's No "I" In Team (Best Collaboration)	Nominated
2001	"South Side"	My Favorite Video	Nominated

== Nickelodeon Kids' Choice Awards ==
Year	Nominee / work	Award	Result
2006	"Hollaback Girl"	Favorite Song	Nominated

== NME Awards ==
Year	Nominee / work	Award	Result
2005	Gwen Stefani	Sexiest Female	Won

== NRJ Music Awards ==
Year	Nominee / work	Award	Result
2005	Gwen Stefani	Best International Female	Nominated

== One Show Awards ==
Year	Nominee / work	Award	Result	Ref.
2017	"Make Me Like You"	Best Music Video	Bronze	

== People Choice Awards ==
Year	Nominee / work	Award	Result
2006	Herself	Favorite Female Singer	Nominated
2008	Herself	Favorite Female Singer	Won
2019	Herself	Favorite Fashion Icon of the Year	Won

== People Magazine Awards ==
Year	Nominee / work	Award	Result
2014	Gwen Stefani	Style Icon of the Year	Won

== Premios OYE! Awards ==
Year	Nominee / work	Award	Result
2005	Gwen Stefani	International Newcomer	Won

== Q Awards ==
Year	Nominee / work	Award	Result
2005	"What You Waiting For?"	Best Video	Nominated

== Radio Music Awards ==
Year	Nominee / work	Award	Result
2005	Gwen Stefani	Artist of the Year/ Mainstream Hit Radio	Nominated

== Radio Disney Music Awards ==
Year	Nominee / work	Award	Result
2016	Gwen Stefani	Hero Award	Won

== Smash Hits Poll Awards ==
Year	Nominee / work	Award	Result
2005	"Hollaback Girl"	Best Video	Nominated
2005	"Hollaback Girl"	Best Single	Nominated
2005	Gwen Stefani	Best Solo Artist	Nominated
2005	Gwen Stefani	Smash Hits Stars Of The Year	Nominated
2005	Gwen Stefani	Sh! Style Icon	Won
2005	Love. Angel. Music. Baby.	Best Album	Nominated

== Soul Train Music Awards ==
Year	Nominee / work	Award	Result
2006	"Hollaback Girl"	Best R&B/Soul Single, Female	Nominated
2006	"Hollaback Girl"	Best R&B/Soul or Rap Dance Cut	Nominated

== Teen Choice Awards ==
The Teen Choice Awards is an awards show presented annually by the Fox Broadcasting Company. Stefani has received four awards from fourteen nominations.

Year	Nominee / work	Award	Result
2001	"Let Me Blow Ya Mind"	Choice R&B/Hip Hop Track	Won
2005	"Rich Girl"	Choice Breakout	Won
2005	"Rich Girl"	Best Female Video	Nominated
2005	"Rich Girl"	Visionary Award	Won
2005	"Rich Girl"	Choice Collaboration	Won
2005	Hollaback Girl	Choice Single	Nominated
2005	Hollaback Girl	Choice Summer Song	Nominated
2005	Love. Angel. Music. Baby.	Choice Album	Nominated
2007	"The Sweet Escape"	Choice: Single	Nominated
2007	Gwen Stefani	Choice: Female	Nominated
2009	Zuma	Choice Celebrity Baby	Nominated
2010	L.A.M.B	Choice Fashion Line	Nominated
2016	Gwen Stefani	Choice Summer Music Star: Female	Nominated
2016	"Go Ahead and Break My Heart"	Choice Country Song	Nominated

== VH1 Vogue Fashion Awards ==
Year	Nominee / work	Award	Result
2001	"South Side"	Visionary Video	Won
2001	Gwen Stefani	Rock Style	Won

== Vibe Awards ==
Year	Nominee / work	Award	Result
2005	"Can I Have It Like That"	Club Banger	Nominated
2005	"Hollaback Girl"	Hottest Hook	Nominated

== World Music Awards ==
The World Music Awards honors recording artists based on worldwide sales figures provided by the International Federation of the Phonographic Industry.

Year	Nominee / work	Award	Result
2005	Gwen Stefani	Best-selling New Female Artist	Won
2005	Gwen Stefani	Best-Selling Pop Rock Artist	Nominated
2006	Gwen Stefani	Best-Selling Pop Rock Artist	Nominated

== Žebřík Music Awards ==
Year	Nominee / work	Award	Result	Ref.
1997	Gwen Stefani	Best International Female	Nominated	
2003	Gwen Stefani	Best International Female	Nominated	
2004	Gwen Stefani	Best International Female	Nominated	
2004	Gwen Stefani	Best International Surprise	Nominated	
2005	Gwen Stefani	Best International Surprise	Nominated	
2005	Gwen Stefani	Best International Female	Nominated	
2005	Gwen Stefani	Best International Personality	Nominated	
2005	"What You Waiting For?"	Best International Video	Nominated	
2006	Gwen Stefani	Best International Female	Nominated	
2007	Gwen Stefani	Best International Female	Nominated	

== See also ==
- List of awards and nominations received by No Doubt
