= What You Waiting For? =

2004 single by Gwen Stefani

Single by Gwen Stefani

from the album Love. Angel. Music. Baby.
- Released: October 4, 2004
- Studio: Home Recordings (London); Henson (Hollywood)
- Genre: Electropop; new wave; dance-rock; funk
- Length: 3:41
- Label: Interscope
- Songwriters: Gwen Stefani; Linda Perry
- Producer: Nellee Hooper

Gwen Stefani singles chronology
"Let Me Blow Ya Mind" (2001)	"What You Waiting For?" (2004)	"Rich Girl" (2004)

Music video
- "What You Waiting For?" on YouTube

"What You Waiting For?" is a song by American singer Gwen Stefani from her debut solo studio album, Love. Angel. Music. Baby. (2004). Written by Stefani and Linda Perry, the song is the album's opening track and was released as Stefani's debut solo single. Lyrically, "What You Waiting For?" details Stefani's lack of inspiration and fear of producing the album, as well as her reaction to pressures exerted by her record label. It is primarily an electropop song and introduces Stefani's four backup dancers, the Harajuku Girls, who had a major input into the album's production.

"What You Waiting For?" was released as the album's lead single; according to Stefani, as an "explanation for doing the record". The song was well received by critics and was frequently cited as a highlight of the album. The single was commercially successful, topping the chart in Australia and reaching the top 10 in several countries. It was certified platinum in the United States, and was nominated for Best Female Pop Vocal Performance at the 47th Annual Grammy Awards. The song has been remixed a number of times, and was covered by the indie rock band Franz Ferdinand and singer Marina Diamandis.

== Background and writing ==
During the night of the 45th Annual Grammy Awards, Linda Perry forced Gwen Stefani into a chokehold, and demanded that they were "gonna write songs together!", to which Stefani reluctantly agreed. Soon after, Stefani finished the Rock Steady Tour with her band No Doubt, and took a call from her label Interscope Records, who informed her that Perry was in a studio ready to collaborate and that Perry "only [had] five days out of the whole year to work with [her]." Stefani has since admitted that she was frustrated by not being able to see her husband Gavin Rossdale, and was intimidated at the thought of collaboration, in particular with Perry, who she did not feel was qualified to write dance music. Stefani was exhausted by the recently completed tour, and shortly afterwards suffered an emotional breakdown, which she spent in bed crying.

During their first day of work, the two wrote a song titled "Fine by You", which Stefani later described as "a stupid love song, but really good". Perry remarked that the song "wasn't right", and the track was excluded from the album. The session was unproductive, due in part to Stefani's self-consciousness and writer's block, and she at one stage broke down in tears in the studio. Stefani has since admitted that writing songs without her band members felt "humiliating and intimidating even if they're sweet and excited, because you're drowning in their creativity".

Perry recalled feeling Stefani's hesitation upon first meeting: "Jimmy Iovine really wanted Gwen to go solo... From my take of it, Gwen was very reluctant — she was not ready to go be Gwen Stefani. When she showed up, you could just tell she was, 'Oh, I don’t know if I wanna be here.' She was literally a kid with their foot halfway out the door and halfway in. I felt agonized for her. We talked for a while and then I said, 'Why don’t you go? Let's come back tomorrow and let's see how you feel. Don’t worry about it.' She left, and I was up all night long. I wanted her to show up the next day and be inspired."

That night, Perry began work on another track, which she played for Stefani the next day to motivate her. Stefani was impressed with the track, and Perry asked her, "What are you waiting for?" According to Perry, Stefani took the question as a dare, replying, "You're totally challenging me, right?" The two began writing lyrics for the new wave-styled song based on Stefani's writer's block and fears about making a solo record, and it grew into "What You Waiting For?" Perry set up multiple microphones to record different lines of verses, with each labeled as a different "character," leading to the battling back-and-forth in Stefani's delivery.

Stefani came up with the idea of the Harajuku Girls while writing the song. Stefani first saw the women of Harajuku, known for their unique style drawing from Gothic Lolita and cyberpunk fashion, in 1996 and had admired them since. She decided to mention them in the line "You Harajuku Girls, damn you got some wicked style", and the concept grew into a running theme on Love. Angel. Music. Baby., which went as far as to feature one song named after and dedicated to them.

== Composition ==
"What You Waiting For?"
Stefani changes her pitch to portray a dialogue between the two personalities in the lyrics.

"What You Waiting For?" combines the genres of electropop, new wave, dance-rock, and funk, and was composed in common time and in the key of G minor. It is written in verse-chorus form, and its instrumentation derives from the guitar and electronic keyboard. The song opens with an emotional piano solo as a tribute to Stefani's time with No Doubt. The verse begins at only 60 beats per minute and gradually slows, mixed with sounds of applause from the audience. A beat set at 138 BPM begins, and Stefani repeats the phrase "tick-tock", commonly interpreted as a reference to her maternal clock and the pressures she felt about producing the album.

Stefani creates an argument between lyrical personas by alternating her vocal range and point of view. Stefani's vocal range spans two octaves in the song, from G_{3} to G_{5}. In a melody similar to that of Weezer's "Hash Pipe", one side of Stefani's personality sings in a higher range in the first person, and the other, more confident personality sings lower in the second person. During the verses, the more nervous personality discusses her concerns about leaving No Doubt for a solo career as well as the ephemeral success of female singers in the music industry. The chorus is a boost of confidence for her and continues the song's time motif with the lines "Look at your watch now/You're still a super hot female". Backed by perfect octave dyads, Stefani sings a verse about her excitement for her future, and the two personalities merge into one during the coda.

== Critical reception ==
"What You Waiting For?" received positive reviews from critics. Nick Sylvester of Pitchfork gave the song a strong review, rating it four and a half stars, and labeled it "fucking great". The website went on to rank the song 16th on its list of the Top 50 Singles of 2004. RJ Smith of Blender noted the song's new wave influence by stating that it could start a revival of Missing Persons, and Amy Linden of The Village Voice compared the "giddy, yodeling vocals" to those of Lene Lovich's 1981 song "New Toy". Jason Damas from PopMatters was mixed on the song, calling the opening "awkward" and the refrain "ridiculously dumb", but arguing that the song "is so frivolous and stupid that it winds up being brilliant; it pretends to be nothing more than party bubblegum and achieves its artistic criteria beautifully." Slant Magazine's Sal Cinquemani agreed, stating that "it's this impishness that helps make 'What You Waiting For' one of the hottest 'arrival' songs of all time". Richard Smirke of Playlouder found the track's production "crisp" and "edgy", and Jennifer Nine of Dotmusic called the song "itchily irresistible". Jemma Volp-Fletcher, writing for Contactmusic.com, rated the song nine out of 10, commenting that it has "irresistible commercial pull and a melody to die for" and that the track "makes the most of her unmistakable vocal and reflects that off-the-wall Stefani personality perfectly." Natasha Tripney from musicOMH gave the song a negative review, stating that "it'll become one of those tracks that's irritatingly catchy—but on this initial listening, Ms Stefani's debut solo effort is just plain irritating."

Many reviewers considered the track one of the album's highlights. Entertainment Weekly critic David Browne gave Love. Angel. Music. Baby. a C+ rating but called the track "one of the album's undeniable highs". In its review of the album, Nick Sylvester of Pitchfork believed that "we can't expect 12 more cuts as personal or urgent as debut single 'What You Waiting For'", while naming it "one of the best electro songs this year". Lisa Haines of BBC Music stated that it "stands out as the best track on the album for the way it pits storming beats against enthusiastic lyrics" and compared the song to Goldfrapp's 2003 single "Strict Machine". Eric Greenwood of Drawer B, who felt that the album "fails on every level", also commented that "if this album had even two more songs this immediate and catchy, then I'd stick my neck out for it, but, sadly, it's the only song worth listening to." In 2004, Slant Magazine ranked the song number 84 in their list of "The 100 Greatest Dance Songs of All Time". And in 2009, The Daily Telegraph listed the song at number 82 on their list "100 songs that defined the Noughties."

== Commercial performance ==
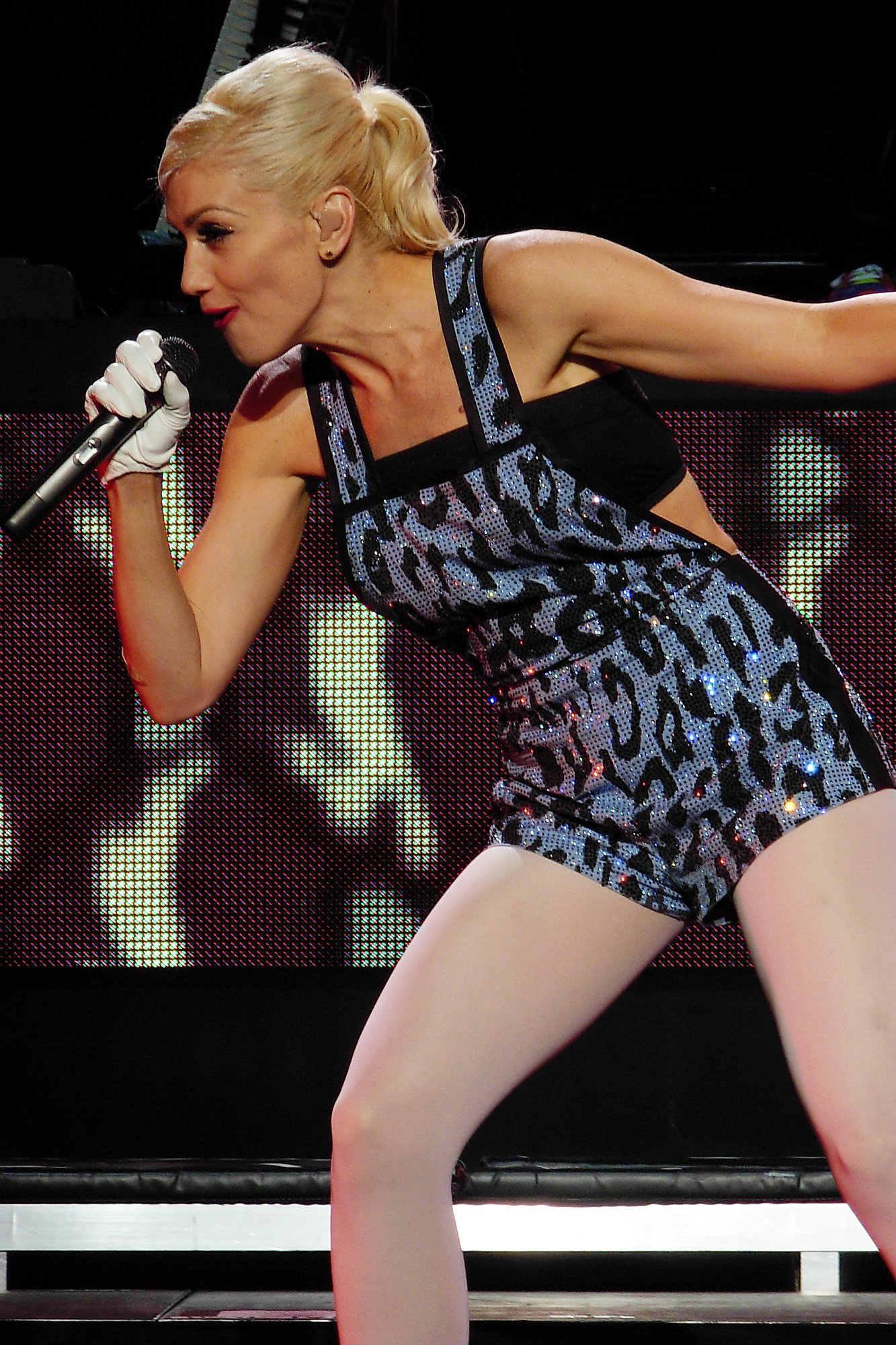
Stefani closed her 2007 Sweet Escape Tour with a performance of "What You Waiting For?"

In the United States, "What You Waiting For?" debuted at number 93 on the Billboard Hot 100 on the issue dated October 16, 2004. It reached a peak of number 47 on November 27, 2004, and remained on the chart for a total of 20 weeks. The song topped the Hot Dance Club Play chart, but only had moderate success on the pop charts, reaching number 17 on the Mainstream Top 40 and number 24 on the Adult Top 40. The song was certified platinum by the Recording Industry Association of America (RIAA) on March 8, 2021. Additionally, it was nominated for Best Female Pop Vocal Performance at the 47th Annual Grammy Awards in 2005, but lost to Norah Jones' "Sunrise".

Elsewhere, the song's reception was stronger. In the United Kingdom, "What You Waiting For?" debuted and peaked at number four on the UK Singles Chart and remained on the chart for 15 weeks. The single performed well across most of the rest of Europe, reaching the top five in Belgium, Denmark, Finland, France, Ireland, Italy, Norway, and Romania, and the top 10 in Austria, Hungary, the Netherlands, and Sweden.

In Australia, "What You Waiting For?" debuted atop the ARIA Singles Chart on November 14, 2004, and stayed there for two weeks. It remained within the top three through January 17, 2005, and dropped off the chart after 15 weeks. In 2014, the single was certified double platinum by the Australian Recording Industry Association (ARIA). The song reached number three on New Zealand's RIANZ Singles Chart and spent four months on the chart.

== Music video ==
The song's music video was directed by Francis Lawrence and produced by Caleb Dewart of DNA Inc. The video deals directly with the lyrics' theme of Stefani's search for inspiration in songwriting. It opens with a lengthy non-musical section in which Stefani arrives in Los Angeles from No Doubt's Rock Steady Tour. She receives several calls from Interscope label head Jimmy Iovine, who attempts to push her forward with her solo debut project, but she replies that she is tired and uninspired. After a failed studio attempt, Stefani sees a flyer advertising help for writer's block. Upon arrival, she is asked to fill out a suspicious questionnaire, where the camera pans to the questions which will be important. She is then told that she will be billed when she is finished. She asks for clarification only to discover that she is already back in the studio by herself. When Stefani picks up an oversized pocket watch from the piano, a rabbit knick-knack that she had previously seen jumps across the room. She throws the watch at the knick-knack, causing her to fall back on her wooden chair and find herself transported to a fantasy world based on Alice's Adventures in Wonderland and Through the Looking-Glass.

Stefani in the Alice in Wonderland-inspired music video for "What You Waiting For?"

Stefani portrays several characters from the books, including Alice, the White Queen, and the Red Queen, in dresses by British-Gibraltarian fashion designer John Galliano. The video frequently cuts to Stefani back in the studio to show her singing and performing in semi-synchronization with her actions within her fantasy world. As this transpires the song is recording itself. Stefani ultimately rediscovers her confidence, and her full awareness is transported back to the ordinary reality of the studio just as she dances in front of her four giggling Harajuku Girls. She then is presented with her bill by the consultant as the chair topples to the floor.

There are four versions of the video. The full, long version is one minute longer than the Making the Video version, while the cut version omits the scenes in which she leaves the airport and is sleepy and in which she fills out the questionnaire. The short version begins with Stefani practicing on the piano and her finding the watch just seconds after that. Her being billed is not shown in this version, so the video ends with the Harajuku Girls laughing at her performance.

The music video was well received by many reviewers. Sam Bloch from Stylus Magazine referred to it as a short film, comparing it to Michael Jackson's Thriller, and commented, "I sigh with admiration and wish every video was this alive." The video debuted on MTV's Total Request Live on October 19, 2004, at number 11. The following month it reached the top of the chart and was there for three non-consecutive days, remaining over five weeks on the program. At the 2005 MTV Video Music Awards, the video won the award for Best Art Direction and was nominated for Best Editing. At the 2005 MuchMusic Video Awards, the video was nominated for Best International Video but lost to Usher's "Caught Up". It won the award for Best Dressed Video at the first MTV Australia Video Music Awards, and was also nominated for Video of the Year and Best Pop Video.

== Alternative versions ==
Stuart Price (also known as Jacques Lu Cont) made the most well-known remix of the song, titled the Thin White Duke Mix, which was included on the CD single. The track, over eight minutes long, is carried by a guitar riff and occasional chimes. The remix received positive reviews from music critics. Aaron Mandel of Pitchfork labeled it "outstanding", and John M. Cunningham of Stylus Magazine stated that it "endowed [the song] with a sense of grandeur". DJ InVincible from About.com viewed the remix as "moody and a bit hypnotic", commenting that it is "best suited for early-evening sets". Armand van Helden created two remixes, the Armand van Helden Remix and the Armand van Helden Dub, which use only some of the original vocals and a new bassline constructed with synthesizers and some electric guitar. Felix da Housecat created the Rude Ho Mix, which uses more bass guitar and leaves out the original background vocals by Mimi Parker until the final verse.

Alex Kapranos, guitarist and lead singer of Scottish indie rock band Franz Ferdinand, wore a Gwen Stefani pin on a Members Only jacket as a tribute to "What You Waiting For?". In December 2005, the band performed a cover version of the song on Live Lounge, a segment of The Jo Whiley Show on BBC Radio 1. The cover includes the chorus from Billy Idol's 1983 song "White Wedding". In October 2006, the song was released as a part of the Radio 1's Live Lounge compilation, and the cover received mixed reviews. Jack Foley from IndieLondon called the track "completely insane", stating that it "really has to be heard to be believed." The Guardian's Dorian Lynskey found the cover smug, adding that "one of Alex Kapranos's eyebrows [is] raised so high that it practically vacates his head."

Welsh indie pop singer Marina Diamandis covered "What You Waiting For?" during some of her early live performances in 2009. Mary Bellamy of Drowned in Sound referred to her debut album The Family Jewels (2010) as "an extended album length re-write" of "What You Waiting For?".

== Formats and track listings ==
- European 2-track CD single; German 3-inch CD single; Digital single
1. "What You Waiting For?" (Album Version) – 3:41
2. "What You Waiting For?" (Jacques Lu Cont's TWD Mix) – 8:02
- Australian and European CD maxi-single
1. "What You Waiting For?" (Album Version) – 3:41
2. "What You Waiting For?" (Jacques Lu Cont's TWD Mix) – 8:02
3. "What You Waiting For?" (Jacques Lu Cont's TWD Dub) – 8:22
4. "What You Waiting For?" (Video) (Director's Cut) – 8:37
- UK CD maxi-single
1. "What You Waiting For?" (Album Version) – 3:41
2. "What You Waiting For?" (Jacques Lu Cont's TWD Mix) – 8:02
3. "What You Waiting For?" (Instrumental) – 3:41
4. "What You Waiting For?" (Video) (Director's Cut) – 8:37
- Japanese CD maxi-single
1. "What You Waiting For?" (Album Version) – 3:41
2. "What You Waiting For?" (Jacques Lu Cont's TWD Mix) – 8:02
3. "What You Waiting For?" (Jacques Lu Cont's TWD Dub) – 8:22
- US 12-inch vinyl

A. "What You Waiting For?" (Album Version) – 3:41
B. "What You Waiting For?" (Instrumental) – 3:41

- US 12-inch white vinyl (Remixes)

A. "What You Waiting For?" (Armand Van Helden Remix) – 8:39
B1. "What You Waiting For?" (The Rude Ho Mix by Felix da Housecat) – 5:07
B2. "What You Waiting For?" (Armand Van Helden Dub) – 7:55

- European 12-inch vinyl

A1. "What You Waiting For?" (Jacques Lu Cont's TWD Mix) – 8:02
A2. "What You Waiting For?" (Album Version) – 3:41
B1. "What You Waiting For?" (Jacques Lu Cont's TWD Dub) – 8:22
B2. "What You Waiting For?" (Instrumental) – 3:41

== Credits and personnel ==
Credits are adapted from the liner notes of Love. Angel. Music. Baby.

- Gwen Stefani – lead vocals, songwriting
- Rusty Anderson – additional guitar
- Greg Collins – recording
- Brian "Big Bass" Gardner – mastering
- Rob Haggett – second assistant engineer
- Nellee Hooper – production
- Sam Littlemore – programming
- Kevin Mills – assistant engineering
- Mimi (Audia) Parker – backing vocals
- Linda Perry – guitar, guitar recording, keyboard recording, keyboards, songwriting
- Ian Rossiter – recording
- Mark "Spike" Stent – mixing
- David Treahearn – assistant engineering

== Charts ==
=== Weekly charts ===
Weekly chart performance for "What You Waiting For?"
Chart (2004–2005)	Peak position
Australia (ARIA)	1
Australian Dance (ARIA)	1
Austria (Ö3 Austria Top 40)	7
Belgium (Ultratop 50 Flanders)	8
Belgium (Ultratop 50 Wallonia)	4
Canada CHR/Pop Top 30 (Radio & Records)	8
Canada Hot AC Top 30 (Radio & Records)	3
CIS Airplay (TopHit)	3
Croatia (HRT)	5
Czech Republic (IFPI)	2
Denmark (Tracklisten)	2
Europe (European Hot 100 Singles)	6
Finland (Suomen virallinen lista)	4
France (SNEP)	5
Germany (GfK)	22
Greece (IFPI Greece)	17
Hungary (Rádiós Top 40)	26
Hungary (Single Top 40)	8
Hungary (Dance Top 40)	9
Ireland (IRMA)	2
Italy (FIMI)	2
Netherlands (Dutch Top 40)	7
Netherlands (Single Top 100)	15
New Zealand (Recorded Music NZ)	3
Norway (VG-lista)	3
Romania (Romanian Top 100)	2
Russia Airplay (TopHit)	1
Scottish Singles Sales (Official Charts)	2
Spain (Promusicae)	20
Sweden (Sverigetopplistan)	6
Switzerland (Schweizer Hitparade)	17
UK Singles (Official Charts)	4
US Billboard Hot 100	47
US Adult Pop Airplay (Billboard)	24
US Dance Club Songs (Billboard)	1
US Dance Singles Sales (Billboard)	5
US Dance Airplay (Billboard)	17
US Pop Airplay (Billboard)	17
US Pop 100 (Billboard)	14

=== Year-end charts ===
2004 year-end chart performance for "What You Waiting For?"
Chart (2004)	Position
Australia (ARIA)	26
Australia Dance (ARIA)	1
CIS Airplay (TopHit)	57
Netherlands (Dutch Top 40)	81
Russia Airplay (TopHit)	34
Sweden (Hitlistan)	72
UK Singles (OCC)	66

2005 year-end chart performance for "What You Waiting For?"
Chart (2005)	Position
Australia (ARIA)	40
Australia Dance (ARIA)	4
Austria (Ö3 Austria Top 40)	74
Belgium (Ultratop 50 Flanders)	93
Belgium (Ultratop 50 Wallonia)	56
CIS Airplay (TopHit)	77
Europe (European Hot 100 Singles)	27
France (SNEP)	61
Italy (FIMI)	41
Romania (Romanian Top 100)	34
Russia Airplay (TopHit)	71
Sweden (Hitlistan)	84
Switzerland (Schweizer Hitparade)	78
UK Singles (OCC)	174
US Hot Dance Club Play (Billboard)	9
US Pop 100 (Billboard)	97

=== Decade-end charts ===
Decade-end chart performance for "What You Waiting For?"
Chart (2000–2009)	Position
Australia (ARIA)	75
US Hot Dance Club Songs (Billboard)	8

== Certifications ==
Certifications for "What You Waiting For?"
Region	Certification	Certified units/sales
Australia (ARIA)	2× Platinum	140,000^{^}
New Zealand (RMNZ)	Platinum	30,000^{‡}
Norway (IFPI Norway)	Gold	5,000^{*}
Sweden (GLF)	Gold	10,000^{^}
United Kingdom (BPI)	Platinum	600,000^{‡}
United States (RIAA)	Platinum	1,000,000^{‡}
^{*} Sales figures based on certification alone.^{^} Shipments figures based on certification alone.^{‡} Sales+streaming figures based on certification alone.

== Release history ==
Release dates and formats for "What You Waiting For?"
Region	Date	Format	Label	Ref.
United States	October 4, 2004	Contemporary hit radio	Interscope	
Australia	November 8, 2004	CD single	Universal	
Germany	November 8, 2004	CD single	Universal	
Japan	November 10, 2004	CD single	Universal Music Japan	
United Kingdom	November 15, 2004	CD single	Polydor	
United States	December 7, 2004	12-inch vinyl	Interscope	
