= Cure4Kids =

Cure4Kids is a web-based education project of St. Jude Children's Research Hospital. Its goal is to help health professionals in countries with limited resources improve the survival rates of children with life-threatening illnesses, including pediatric cancer, sickle cell disease, and HIV/AIDS. The Cure4Kids website provides access to online seminars and conferences with audio narration, presenting current research and best practices, clinical and scientific advances, as well as case studies and treatment analyses. The website also provides access to consultation and mentoring through web-conferencing technology, training for management and analysis of clinical patient information, electronic full-text books and journals, and online courses. The Cure4Kids site contains over 2,000 seminars, courses and conferences. All material can be used and downloaded for reference and educational purposes. Cure4Kids is funded by St. Jude and ALSAC, the American Lebanese Syrian Associated Charities.

As of May 1, 2012, Cure4Kids had more than 31,000 registered users (including doctors, nurses and other health professionals) in 183 countries. Since its inception in 2002, Cure4Kids users have accessed or downloaded individual content items more than 5.7 million times. Over 300 international groups meet online in Cure4Kids web conferencing rooms to discuss clinical cases and share knowledge on the treatment of cancer and other catastrophic diseases in children. From October 1, 2002, through May 1, 2012, Cure4Kids’ online meeting rooms were accessed over 117,000 times by health professionals for online education and clinical discussions.

In 2007 Cure4Kids also launched Oncopedia, a section in Cure4Kids that is compiled using online submissions from Cure4Kids users. The main purpose of Oncopedia is to provide a forum in which registered Cure4Kids users can participate in asynchronous online discussions of critical issues related to pediatric oncology and hematology. The content includes complex hematology/oncology cases and images with specific questions about patient management, controversial topics, and interesting presentation features, including illustrations of patients' clinical characteristics and imaging and pathology findings. An international editorial board reviews all the contributions. The cases that are chosen are posted on Oncopedia with expert commentary from our editorial board, and then opened for online moderated discussion. Registered Cure4Kids users can interact online with other users and the editorial board by posting opinions and questions about the content. All material can be freely used and downloaded for reference and educational purposes. Oncopedia combines the open participatory features of collaborative Web sites such as English Wikipedia with the benefits of an international editorial board composed of subject matter experts. Initially, Oncopedia content consisted of case reports, images, and chapters. In 2008 polls, image challenges and educational videos were added as additional tools for education and interaction. As of May 1, 2012, Oncopedia contained 160 case reports, 159 images, 72 videos, 53 chapters, 33 polls and 43 image challenges. Oncopedia has been viewed 160,000 times by 8,654 users.

Cure4Kids for Kids is a community outreach program intended to help children, their parents, and teachers understand the basic science of cancer and its treatment. With culturally sensitive and age-appropriate content, the program is designed to educate children, parents and teachers about cancer and dispel common misconceptions about childhood cancer, instill healthy habits in children that could prevent the development of adult cancer, and increase children's overall interest in science and scientific careers. The pilot program contained three educational modules: Cells (presented as the basic unit of life), Cancer (presented as a disease of unhealthy cells) and Healthy Living (presented as practices for cancer prevention such as proper nutrition, safe sun exposure, tobacco control and appropriate physical activity). The Cure4Kids for Kids web site provides cancer education for children in elementary school. For each module, St. Jude provides a teacher's guide, children's book, activity book, in-class presentation and activities related to the topic. The Cure4Kids for Kids teacher website was developed to support teachers delivering cancer and healthy living education. The Cure4Kids for Kids websites have been viewed over 76,000 times by 11,000 users in 121 countries.

In 2012, Cure4Kids was awarded the Gold Communicator Award from The International Academy of Visual Arts, and a Webby Honoree Award. In 2011 Cure4Kids received the top Platinum award for Best Overall Internet Site at the e-Healthcare Leadership Awards at the 15th Annual Healthcare Internet Conference and a Gold Davey Award. In 2010 Cure4Kids received the Best Medical Website award for Outstanding Achievement in Web Development at the 14th Annual Web Awards. In 2009 Cure4Kids received the Gold Award in the Best Health/Healthcare Content in the Strategic e-Healthcare Awards. In 2008 Cure4Kids won the Gold W3 Web Award in Education Category. In 2007 Cure4Kids was selected as an official honoree for the health category at the 12th Annual Webby Awards.
