= Rich Girl (Gwen Stefani song) =

2004 single by Gwen Stefani

Single by Gwen Stefani featuring Eve

from the album Love. Angel. Music. Baby.
- Released: December 14, 2004
- Studio: Encore (Burbank, California); Record One (Los Angeles); Henson Recording (Hollywood, California)
- Genre: Reggae; ragga
- Length: 3:56
- Label: Interscope
- Songwriters: Mark Batson; Jerry Bock; Kara DioGuardi; Mike Elizondo; Eve; Sheldon Harnick; Chantal Kreviazuk; Gwen Stefani; Andre Young
- Producer: Dr. Dre

Gwen Stefani singles chronology
"What You Waiting For?" (2004)	"Rich Girl" (2004)	"Hollaback Girl" (2005)

Eve singles chronology
"Not Today" (2004)	"Rich Girl" (2004)	"Like This" (2007)

Music video
- "Rich Girl" on YouTube

"Rich Girl" is a song by American singer and songwriter Gwen Stefani from her debut solo studio album, Love. Angel. Music. Baby. (2004). Produced by Dr. Dre, the track features American rapper Eve and is a remake of Louchie Lou & Michie One's 1993 song of the same name, which in turn interpolates the Fiddler on the Roof song "If I Were a Rich Man". The song discusses Stefani's dreams of fame and riches from the perspective of "when she was just an Orange County girl".

The last song to be included on the album, "Rich Girl" was released as the album's second single on December 14, 2004. The song received mixed reviews from music critics; while some praised its musical composition, others questioned the irony of its lyrical premise about what it would be like to be rich and famous. It was a commercial success, reaching number one in Costa Rica and Peru as well as the top 10 on most of the other charts it entered. In the United States, "Rich Girl" was certified gold, and it received a nomination for Best Rap/Sung Collaboration at the 48th Annual Grammy Awards.

== Writing and development ==
Stefani and Eve had previously collaborated on the 2001 single "Let Me Blow Ya Mind". When Stefani first began recording solo material, Eve expressed interest in working with Stefani again, saying, "She's fly, she's tight and she is talented. It's going to be hot regardless." The two decided to work together again after talking in Stefani's laundry room during a party. After Stefani had co-written more than 20 songs for her solo debut, she approached Dr. Dre, who had produced for her twice before. Dre had produced "Let Me Blow Ya Mind" as well as "Wicked Day", a track that was excluded from No Doubt's 2001 album Rock Steady.

"Rich Girl"
A 24-second sample of "Rich Girl", a ragga adaptation of the Fiddler on the Roof song "If I Were a Rich Man"

After playing some of the songs on which she had been working, Dr. Dre told her, "You don't want to go back there." Instead of using one of the tracks, Dr. Dre instead suggested using English reggae duo Louchie Lou & Michie One's 1993 song "Rich Girl", which itself interpolated "If I Were a Rich Man" from the 1964 musical Fiddler on the Roof. Stefani and Eve helped each other with their parts, but when they presented Dr. Dre with the demo, he told them to rewrite the song, suggesting that Stefani play a character in the song.

Since she had not seen the musical since she was a child, Stefani went to Broadway to better understand the theme that "even if you're poor and you have love, you're rich." The idea which became the final version came to Stefani while brainstorming on her treadmill. She commented that the troubles in writing the song came because "Dre was really pushing me to write in a new way", but when she presented him with the song, "he just totally tricked the track out."

== Composition ==
The chorus, which indirectly draws from "If I Were a Rich Man", is backed by a repeating C-G dyad

"Rich Girl" is a reggae song composed in the key of C minor. It is written in common time and moves at a moderate 100 beats per minute. The beat is accompanied by an alternating perfect fifth dyad and an accented piano trichord. The song is written in verse–chorus form, and its instrumentation includes the electronic keyboard, guitar, and keyboard bass. Stefani's voice ranges from G_{3} to E_{5}.

The introduction consists of the repeated use of the word na. Stefani reaches her highest note of the song, E_{5}, as part of a trichord and her lowest, G_{3}, during this section. After the first chorus, Stefani discusses dreams of wealth and luxury, and she namechecks fashion designers Vivienne Westwood and John Galliano. Stefani commented that the references were not product placement but that she included them "because I think they're rad and want to talk about them. [...] I'd give all my money to [Westwood] and buy all her clothes!" A bridge, in which Stefani's voice is overdubbed, precedes the second chorus. During the second verse Stefani discusses her Harajuku Girls, and she then repeats the bridge. Following Eve's rap, Stefani sings the chorus and closes the song by repeating the introduction as a coda.

== Critical reception ==
"Rich Girl" received mixed reviews from music critics. Richard Smirke of Playlouder said that it brought "a much-needed element of diversity" to L.A.M.B. and called it a "potential hit single". Krissi Murison of the NME, however, described it as "playground chant featuring a tough-girl ragga cameo from Eve." John Murphy from musicOMH gave it an overall positive review, calling it "a great fun song, and far superior to some of the dross that comes out these days", but also commented that it did not live up to "Let Me Blow Ya Mind" and found the references to the Harajuku Girls "slightly creepy." Lisa Haines of BBC Music referred to the song as "disco gold, impossibly girly and very easy to dance to." The song drew comparisons to the No Doubt album Rock Steady, and Charles Merwin of Stylus Magazine described it as "a lite version of 'Hey Baby'."

"I could tell I had ruffled Gwen's feathers when we spoke before the disc came out. It was the first time I took her to task for disingenuousness—for being ungodly rich yet still singing, 'If I were a rich girl....'

'What do you mean by that?' she snapped. I said the song could be seen as absurd, even untrue. She explained its lyrics were about when she was just an Orange County girl—ah, that troubling phrase!—dreaming of such wealth."

— Ben Wener, The Orange County Register

Several reviewers found it ironic that Stefani, who had already sold 26 million records with No Doubt, discussed having money in the counterfactual conditional. John Murphy from musicOMH found it "rather strange" for Stefani to sing the song while living off of royalties from No Doubt and her husband, post-grunge musician Gavin Rossdale. Anthony Carew from Neumu called the lyrics "insipid" and noted that "the incredibly wealthy pop-starlet wonders what it'd be like to be, uh, incredibly wealthy". The Orange County Register writer Ben Wener told Stefani that the song was disingenuous and "absurd", to which Stefani responded that the point of view was from before she was famous. Stefani later refused to issue credentials to the newspaper after Wener wrote that "while posting a reported US$90 million via her clothing lines [...] she's no more 'just an Orange County girl' than Best Buy is just a shack that sells Commodore 64s" in response to a track titled "Orange County Girl" from Stefani's second album The Sweet Escape.

The interpolation of "If I Were a Rich Man" drew mixed reviews. Jason Damas, writing for PopMatters, argued that the track "turns it into an anthem of urban bling-lust" and that its "simple pounding piano chord makes for great percussive backing." Nick Sylvester from Pitchfork Media found the song corny, classifying it as "Eve- and Dre- and Tevye-powered camp-hop." The Villager's Winnie MCCroy found the interpolation "innovative" and noted the song's take on "the current style of shout-out rap songs." David Browne of Entertainment Weekly disagreed, stating that the interpolation was used awkwardly, and Rob Sheffield of Rolling Stone called the interpolation a goof. Jason Shawhan from About.com called the track "a dancehall/classic house teardown of 'If I Were a Rich Man'" and added, "If this is what Jay-Z's fudging with Annie has wrought, I say, be glad of it."

== Commercial performance ==
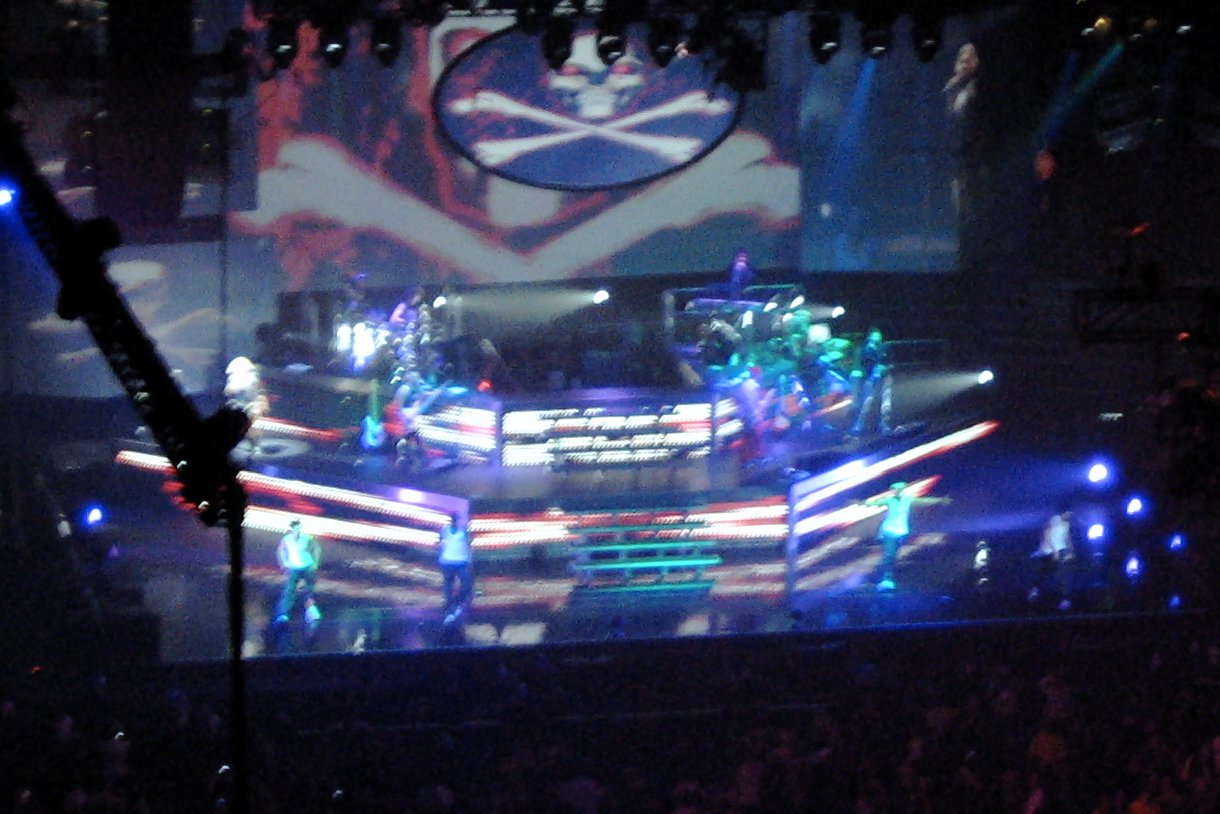
Stefani (far left) performing "Rich Girl" during the Harajuku Lovers Tour

"Rich Girl" debuted at number 74 on the Billboard Hot 100 on December 25, 2004, and peaked 10 weeks later at number seven, remaining on the chart for over six months. The song did well on pop-oriented charts, reaching number three on the Pop 100, number four on the Mainstream Top 40, and number 16 on the Adult Top 40. The single had little crossover success on the urban charts, only reaching number 27 on the Rhythmic Top 40 and number 78 on the Hot R&B/Hip-Hop Songs. "Rich Girl" was helped on the Hot 100 and Pop 100 charts by its strong digital downloads, peaking at number two on the Hot Digital Songs. The song was certified gold by the Recording Industry Association of America (RIAA) on March 29, 2005. At the 48th Annual Grammy Awards, the song was nominated for Best Rap/Sung Collaboration but lost to Jay-Z and Linkin Park's "Numb/Encore".

The physical single for "Rich Girl" was less successful in Canada (mainly due to the physical singles market in Canada becoming significantly more limited in both scope and availability at the time of its release) where it peaked at number 12 on the Canadian Singles Chart. However, the song was largely successful on Canadian radio, reaching number one on Radio & Records' Canada CHR/Pop chart. It also reached number six on their Canada Hot AC chart two months later.

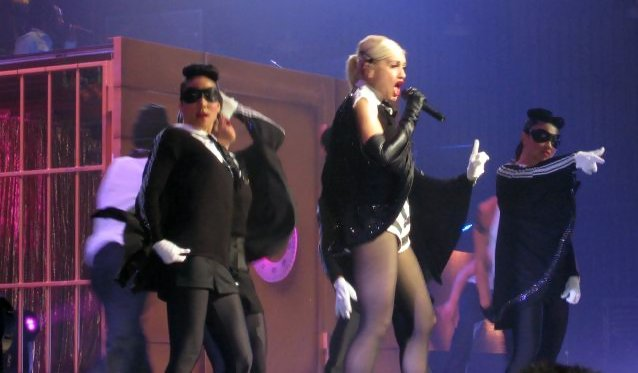
Performances of "Rich Girl" during The Sweet Escape Tour featured Stefani and the Harajuku Girls, wearing bat capes, breaking into a safe

"Rich Girl" was largely successful across Europe, reaching number two on the European Hot 100 Singles. It reached the top five in Belgium, Denmark, France, Ireland, the Netherlands, Norway, and Sweden and the top 10 in Austria, Finland, Italy, and Switzerland. The song also charted highly in the United Kingdom, debuting at number four on March 20, 2005, for the week ending date March 26, 2005. The track was unable to reach a higher position and remained on the chart for 12 weeks.

Elsewhere, "Rich Girl" peaked within the top 20 on the majority of the charts it entered. In Australia, it debuted on February 27, 2005, at number two behind Nelly's "Over and Over" featuring Tim McGraw. It was unable to reach number one and dropped off the chart after 13 weeks. The single was certified platinum by the Australian Recording Industry Association (ARIA) for sales in excess of 70,000 copies.

== Music video ==
Stefani and the Harajuku Girls appear in the Japanese-inspired video for "Rich Girl"

The pirate-themed music video for "Rich Girl" was directed by David LaChapelle and uses the Get Rich mix of the song, which repeats the middle-8 chant section during the intro. The video, inspired by a late-1990s Vivienne Westwood advertising campaign, opens with four Japanese schoolgirls playing with a toy pirate ship and two Bratz dolls of Stefani and Eve, while the girls discuss what they would do if they were a "rich girl". The video features several sequences. Stefani is first shown below the deck of a pirate ship, dancing on a table and singing to the song. She is surrounded by pirates and wenches and is soon joined by Eve, wearing an eyepatch. In the surreal style of LaChapelle, the pirate crew has distorted features, and a leaked casting call commented, "I need the freaks on this one." Above deck Stefani, the Harajuku Girls, Eve, and more pirates dance on the deck and rigging. Stefani is also seen dancing with the Harajuku Girls in a treasure trove, often carrying a sword, and swinging from an anchor. When the girls dunk the toy ship in a fish tank, the galleon engages in cannon fire, causing Stefani and the pirates to fall all over the ship, and Stefani and the Harajuku Girls are soon shipwrecked.

The music video was a success on video channels. The video debuted at number nine on MTV's Total Request Live on December 13, 2004. It worked its way to number five, staying on the chart for a total of 13 days. The video also reached number four on MuchMusic's Countdown, remaining on the chart for 16 weeks. VH1 listed "Rich Girl" at number 24 on its Top 40 Videos of 2005.

== Track listings ==
- European 2-track CD single
1. "Rich Girl" (album version featuring Eve) – 3:56
2. "What You Waiting For?" (live) – 3:52
- Australian, European and UK CD maxi-single
1. "Rich Girl" (album version featuring Eve) – 3:56
2. "What You Waiting For?" (live) – 3:52
3. "Harajuku Girls" (live) – 4:36
4. "Rich Girl" (video) – 4:03
- US 12-inch single

A1. "Rich Girl" (Get Rich Mix) – 4:07
A2. "Rich Girl" (Get Rich Instrumental) – 4:07
B1. "Rich Girl" (Get Rich Quick Mix) – 3:47
B2. "Rich Girl" (Get Rich Quick Instrumental) – 4:07
B3. "Rich Girl" (Acappella) – 3:57

== Personnel ==
Personnel are adapted from the liner notes of Love. Angel. Music. Baby.

- Gwen Stefani – lead vocals, songwriting
- Mark Batson – keyboard bass, keyboards, songwriting
- Greg Collins – recording
- Kara DioGuardi – songwriting
- Dr. Dre – mixing, production, songwriting
- Mike Elizondo – guitar, keyboards, songwriting
- Eve – rap, songwriting
- Francis Forde – assistant engineering
- Brian "Big Bass" Gardner – mastering
- Mauricio "Veto" Iragorri – recording
- Rouble Kapoor – assistant engineering
- Chantal Kreviazuk – songwriting
- Jaime Sickora – assistant engineering
- Brad Winslow – assistant engineering

== Charts ==
=== Weekly charts ===
2005 weekly chart performance for "Rich Girl"
Chart (2005)	Peak position
Australia (ARIA)	2
Austria (Ö3 Austria Top 40)	10
Belgium (Ultratop 50 Flanders)	4
Belgium (Ultratop 50 Wallonia)	12
Canada (Nielsen SoundScan)	12
Canada CHR/Pop Top 30 (Radio & Records)	1
Canada Hot AC Top 30 (Radio & Records)	6
CIS Airplay (TopHit)	16
Colombia (ASINCOL)	2
Costa Rica (Notimex)	1
Croatia International Airplay (HRT)	1
Denmark (Tracklisten)	3
El Salvador (Notimex)	3
Europe (European Hot 100 Singles)	2
Finland (Suomen virallinen lista)	7
France (SNEP)	4
Germany (GfK)	14
Greece (IFPI)	6
Hungary (Rádiós Top 40)	28
Hungary (Dance Top 40)	3
Ireland (IRMA)	2
Italy (FIMI)	7
Netherlands (Dutch Top 40)	3
Netherlands (Single Top 100)	4
New Zealand (Recorded Music NZ)	3
Norway (VG-lista)	2
Peru (Notimex)	1
Russia Airplay (TopHit)	13
Scottish Singles Sales (Official Charts)	4
Sweden (Sverigetopplistan)	4
Switzerland (Schweizer Hitparade)	6
UK Singles (Official Charts)	4
UK Hip Hop/R&B (Official Charts)	1
US Billboard Hot 100	7
US Adult Pop Airplay (Billboard)	16
US Dance Club Songs (Billboard)	39
US Dance Airplay (Billboard)	7
US Hot R&B/Hip-Hop Songs (Billboard)	78
US Pop Airplay (Billboard)	4
US Pop 100 (Billboard)	3
US Rhythmic Airplay (Billboard)	27

2026 weekly chart performance for "Rich Girl"
Chart (2026)	Peak position
Nigeria Bubbling Under Hot 100 (TurnTable)	15
Nigeria Airplay (TurnTable)	72

=== Year-end charts ===
Year-end chart performance for "Rich Girl"
Chart (2005)	Position
Australia (ARIA)	26
Austria (Ö3 Austria Top 40)	65
Belgium (Ultratop 50 Flanders)	27
Belgium (Ultratop 50 Wallonia)	51
CIS Airplay (TopHit)	108
Europe (European Hot 100 Singles)	33
France (SNEP)	76
Germany (Media Control GfK)	87
Italy (FIMI)	42
Netherlands (Dutch Top 40)	47
Netherlands (Single Top 100)	47
New Zealand (RIANZ)	30
Romania (Romanian Top 100)	5
Russia Airplay (TopHit)	96
Sweden (Hitlistan)	16
Switzerland (Schweizer Hitparade)	45
UK Singles (OCC)	48
US Billboard Hot 100	31
US Adult Top 40 (Billboard)	40
US Dance Radio Airplay (Billboard)	36
US Mainstream Top 40 (Billboard)	21
US Pop 100 (Billboard)	13
US Rhythmic Top 40 (Billboard)	84
Venezuela (Record Report)	44

== Certifications ==
Certifications and sales for "Rich Girl"
Region	Certification	Certified units/sales
Australia (ARIA)	Platinum	70,000^{^}
New Zealand (RMNZ)	Platinum	30,000^{‡}
Sweden (GLF)	Gold	10,000^{^}
United Kingdom (BPI)	Gold	400,000^{‡}
United States (RIAA)	2× Platinum	2,000,000^{‡}
^{^} Shipments figures based on certification alone.^{‡} Sales+streaming figures based on certification alone.

== Release history ==
Release dates and formats for "Rich Girl"
Region	Date	Format	Label	Ref.
United States	December 14, 2004	12-inch vinyl	Interscope	
Australia	February 21, 2005	CD	Interscope	
Germany	March 7, 2005	CD	Interscope	
United Kingdom	March 14, 2005	CD	Interscope	
