= List of awards and nominations received by No Doubt =

No Doubt awards and nominations
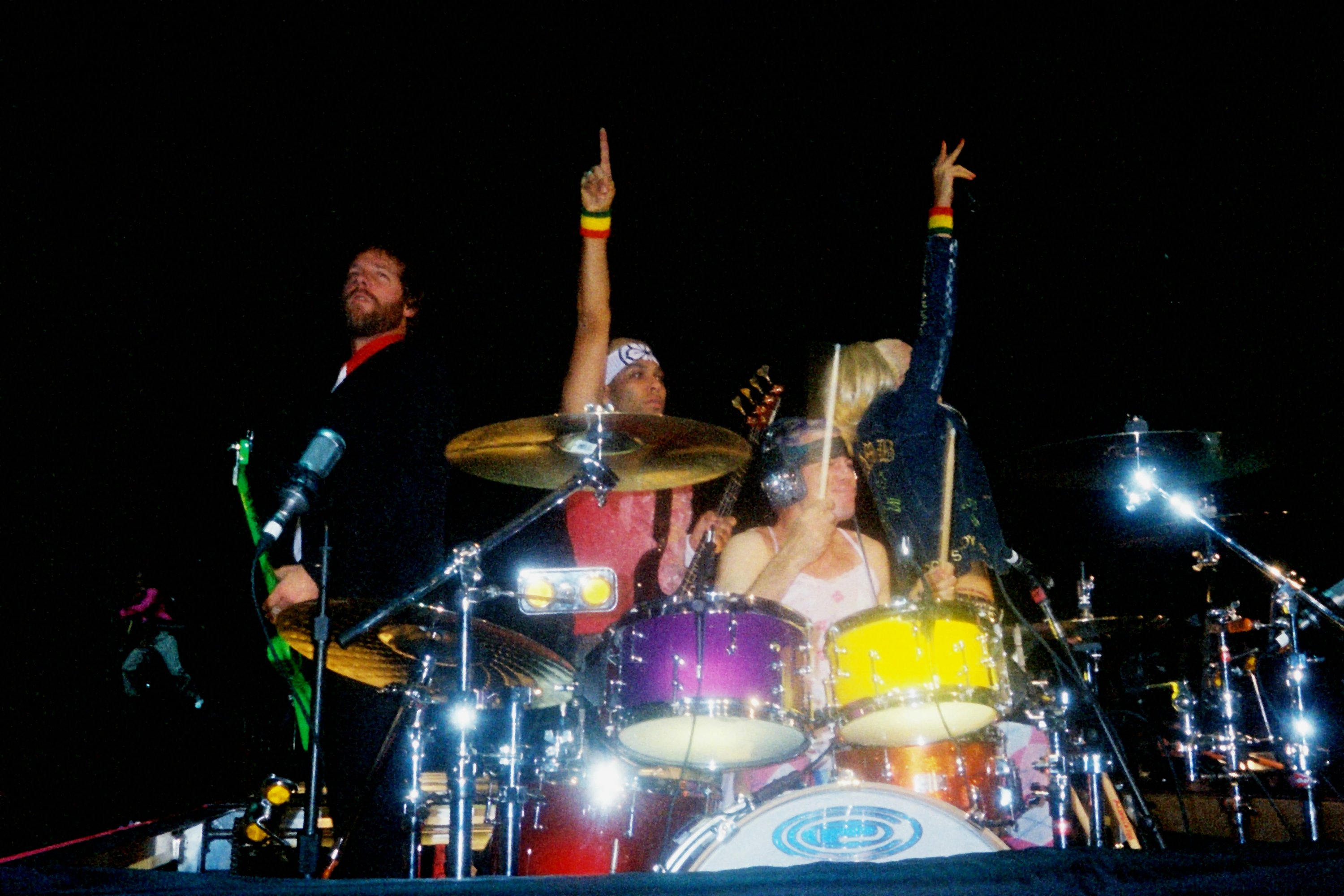
- Left to right: Tom Dumont (guitar), Tony Kanal (bass), Adrian Young (drums), Gwen Stefani (vocals)
Awards and nominations
Award	Wins	Nominations
American Music Awards	0	1
Billboard	1	1
Brit	0	2
Grammy	2	9
MTV Europe	0	5
MTV VMA	6	11
Teen Choice	1	3
Nickelodeon Kids	1	2
VH1/Vogue	1	2

Totals (Note: Certain award groups do not simply award one winner. They acknowledge several different recipients, have runners-up, and have third place. Since this is a specific recognition and is different from losing an award, runner-up mentions are considered wins in this award tally. For simplification and to avoid errors, each award in this list has been presumed to have had a prior nomination.)
- Wins: 21
- Nominations: 50

No Doubt is a third wave ska band from Anaheim, California. No Doubt has released six studio albums: No Doubt (1992), The Beacon Street Collection (1995), Tragic Kingdom (1995), Return of Saturn (2000), Rock Steady (2001), and Push and Shove (2012). All of the band's albums have been released with the Interscope Records record label.

The band's best-selling album, Tragic Kingdom, sold 16 million copies worldwide and peaked at #1 on the Billboard 200, Canadian, Finnish, Norwegian, and New Zealand charts. The album was also certified Diamond in the United States and Canada, three-times Platinum in Australia, and Platinum in the United Kingdom. "Hey Baby", a single from No Doubt's fifth studio album, Rock Steady, received the award for "Best Pop Performance by a Duo or Group with Vocal" from the Grammy Awards, and the awards for both "Best Group Video" and "Best Pop Video" from the MTV Video Music Awards. Overall, No Doubt has received 13 awards from 43 nominations.

== Grammy Awards ==
Year	Nominated work	Award	Result
1997	Tragic Kingdom	Best Rock Album	Nominated
1997	No Doubt	Best New Artist	Nominated
1998	"Don't Speak"	Best Pop Performance by a Duo or Group with Vocals	Nominated
1998	"Don't Speak"	Song of the Year	Nominated
2001	Return of Saturn	Best Rock Album	Nominated
2003	Rock Steady	Best Pop Album	Nominated
2003	"Hella Good"	Best Dance Recording	Nominated
2003	"Hey Baby" (feat. Bounty Killer)	Best Pop Performance by a Duo or Group with Vocals	Won
2004	"Underneath It All" (feat. Lady Saw)	Best Pop Performance by a Duo or Group with Vocals	Won
2005	"It's My Life"	Best Pop Performance by a Duo or Group with Vocals	Nominated

== MTV Video Music Awards ==
Year	Nominee / work	Award	Result
1997	"Don't Speak"	Video of the Year	Nominated
1997	"Don't Speak"	Best Group Video	Won
2002	"Hey Baby"	Best Group Video	Won
2002	"Hey Baby"	Best Pop Video	Won
2003	"Underneath It All"	Best Pop Video	Nominated
2003	"Underneath It All"	Best Cinematography	Nominated
2004	"It's My Life"	Best Group Video	Won
2004	"It's My Life"	Best Pop Video	Won
2004	"It's My Life"	Best Direction	Nominated
2004	"It's My Life"	Best Art Direction	Nominated
2004	"It's My Life"	Best Cinematography	Nominated

== MTV Europe Music Awards ==
Year	Nominee / work	Award	Result
1997	No Doubt	Best New Act	Nominated
1997	Don't Speak	Best Song	Nominated
2002	No Doubt	Best Group	Nominated
2002	Rock Steady	Best Album	Nominated
2012	No Doubt	Best Pop	Nominated
2013	No Doubt	World Stage Performance	Nominated

== MVPA Awards ==
Year	Nominee / work	Award	Result
1998	Live in the Tragic Kingdom	Longform Video of the Year	Won

== Peoples Choice Awards ==
Year	Nominee / work	Award	Result
2013	No Doubt	Favorite Band	Nominated

== ASCAP Pop Music Awards ==
Year	Nominee / work	Award	Result
1999	"Don't Speak"	Most Performed Songs	Won
2004	"Underneath It All"	Most Performed Songs	Won

== American Music Award ==
Year	Nominee / work	Award	Result
1997	No Doubt	Favorite Pop/Rock New Artist	Nominated

== BDSCertified Spins Awards ==
Year	Nominee / work	Award	Result
2002	"Hey Baby"	200,000 Spins	Won
2006	"It's My Life"	400,000 Spins	Won

== BMI Pop Awards ==
Year	Nominee / work	Award	Result
1996	"Don't Speak"	Award-Winning Song	Won
1996	"Spiderwebs"	Award-Winning Song	Won

== Billboard Music Video Award ==
Year	Nominee / work	Award	Result
2000	"Simple Kind of Life"	FAN.tastic Video	Won

== Danish Music Awards ==
Year	Nominee / work	Award	Result
1998	"Don't Speak"	Best International Hit	Won

== VH1/Vogue Fashion Award ==
Year	Nominee / work	Award	Result
1999	"New"	Most Styling Video	Won
2000	"Ex-Girlfriend"	Most Styling Video	Won
2000	No Doubt	Most Stylish Band	Nominated

== Teen Choice Awards ==
Year	Nominee / work	Award	Result
2003	No Doubt	Choice Music: Rock Group	Nominated
2003	"Underneath It All"	Choice Music: Single	Nominated
2003	"Running"	Choice Music: Love Song	Nominated
2004	"It's My Life"	Choice Music: Rock Track	Nominated
2004	Singles Tour	Choice Music: Tour	Won

== BRIT Awards ==
Year	Nominee / work	Award	Result
1998	No Doubt	Best International Newcomer	Nominated
1998	No Doubt	Best International Group	Nominated

== International Dance Music Awards ==
Year	Nominee / work	Award	Result
2003	"It's My Life"	Best Alternative Rock Dance	Nominated

== Nickelodeon Kids' Choice Awards ==
Year	Nominee / work	Award	Result
2003	No Doubt	Favorite Band	Won

== Viva Comet Awards ==
Year	Nominee / work	Award	Result
2002	"Hey Baby"	Best International Video	Nominated

== Žebřík Music Awards ==
Year	Nominee / work	Award	Result	Ref.
1997	No Doubt	Best International Surprise	Nominated	
