= Krueshef =

American Boxer, Singer, and Songwriter

- Born: Clarence Joseph; Frederiksted, St. Croix, U.S. Virgin Islands
- Occupations: Boxer, Singer, and Songwriter
- Years active: 2004–present

Clarence Joseph, professionally known as Krueshef, is a former American boxer and current reggae/dancehall artist. Born in Frederiksted, St. Croix, U.S. Virgin Islands.

== Early life and boxing career ==
Krueshef began his boxing career in St. Croix, where he developed a passion for the sport. As an amateur, he won the New York City and Colorado State Golden Gloves competitions and became a national boxing champion in Las Vegas, Nevada. His achievements led to his selection as an alternate for the US Olympic team to Athens, Greece in 2004.

Transitioning to professional boxing, Krueshef competed in the middleweight division, maintaining an undefeated record with four wins, including two knockouts. He was undefeated as a professional, however, he took a hiatus from boxing in 2019 due to medical reasons.

== Music career ==
After his hiatus from boxing, Krueshef pursued a career in music, focusing on reggae and dancehall genres. His Caribbean heritage and influences from artists like Beenie Man, Bounty Killer, and Merciless shaped his musical style.

In 2020, he released the EP "We Rise Up," featuring tracks that promote empowerment and positivity.

In 2021, Krueshef released the single "Vibes," aiming to uplift and empower listeners.

In December 2023, he released the single "RE-Vibes," a dance track that salutes women and promotes positive vibes.

Discography

- We Rise Up (EP, 2020)
- "Vibes" (Single, 2021)
- "RE-Vibes" (Single, 2023)
