= List of Billboard Mainstream Top 40 number-one songs of 2002 =

This is a list of songs which reached number one on the Billboard magazine Mainstream Top 40 chart in 2002.

During 2002, a total of 13 singles hit number-one on the charts.

| Issue date | Song | Artist(s) | Ref |
|---|---|---|---|
| January 5 | "How You Remind Me" | Nickelback | |
| January 12 | "How You Remind Me" | Nickelback | |
| January 19 | "How You Remind Me" | Nickelback | |
| January 26 | "How You Remind Me" | Nickelback | |
| February 2 | "How You Remind Me" | Nickelback | |
| February 9 | "How You Remind Me" | Nickelback | |
| February 16 | "How You Remind Me" | Nickelback | |
| February 23 | "How You Remind Me" | Nickelback | |
| March 2 | "Hey Baby" | No Doubt | |
| March 9 | "In the End" | Linkin Park | |
| March 16 | "In the End" | Linkin Park | |
| March 23 | "In the End" | Linkin Park | |
| March 30 | "In the End" | Linkin Park | |
| April 6 | "In the End" | Linkin Park | |
| April 13 | "Ain't It Funny" | Jennifer Lopez featuring Ja Rule | |
| April 20 | "Ain't It Funny" | Jennifer Lopez featuring Ja Rule | |
| April 27 | "Ain't It Funny" | Jennifer Lopez featuring Ja Rule | |
| May 4 | "Don't Let Me Get Me" | Pink | |
| May 11 | "Don't Let Me Get Me" | Pink | |
| May 18 | "Don't Let Me Get Me" | Pink | |
| May 25 | "Don't Let Me Get Me" | Pink | |
| June 1 | "A Thousand Miles" | Vanessa Carlton | |
| June 8 | "A Thousand Miles" | Vanessa Carlton | |
| June 15 | "A Thousand Miles" | Vanessa Carlton | |
| June 22 | "A Thousand Miles" | Vanessa Carlton | |
| June 29 | "A Thousand Miles" | Vanessa Carlton | |
| July 6 | "Without Me" | Eminem | |
| July 13 | "Hot in Herre" | Nelly | |
| July 20 | "Hot in Herre" | Nelly | |
| July 27 | "Complicated" | Avril Lavigne | |
| August 3 | "Complicated" | Avril Lavigne | |
| August 10 | "Complicated" | Avril Lavigne | |
| August 17 | "Complicated" | Avril Lavigne | |
| August 24 | "Complicated" | Avril Lavigne | |
| August 31 | "Complicated" | Avril Lavigne | |
| September 7 | "Complicated" | Avril Lavigne | |
| September 14 | "Complicated" | Avril Lavigne | |
| September 21 | "Dilemma" | Nelly featuring Kelly Rowland | |
| September 28 | "Dilemma" | Nelly featuring Kelly Rowland | |
| October 5 | "Dilemma" | Nelly featuring Kelly Rowland | |
| October 12 | "Dilemma" | Nelly featuring Kelly Rowland | |
| October 19 | "Dilemma" | Nelly featuring Kelly Rowland | |
| October 26 | "Sk8er Boi" | Avril Lavigne | |
| November 2 | "Underneath It All" | No Doubt | |
| November 9 | "Underneath It All" | No Doubt | |
| November 16 | "Underneath It All" | No Doubt | |
| November 23 | "Lose Yourself" | Eminem | |
| November 30 | "Lose Yourself" | Eminem | |
| December 7 | "Lose Yourself" | Eminem | |
| December 14 | "Lose Yourself" | Eminem | |
| December 21 | "Lose Yourself" | Eminem | |
| December 28 | "Lose Yourself" | Eminem | |

== See also ==
- 2002 in music
