= Making Out (song) =

Promotional single by No Doubt

from the album Rock Steady
- Released: 2002
- Recorded: 2001
- Studio: Guerilla Canyon Studios (Los Angeles, CA); The Sideshack (Los Angeles, CA); Westlake Recording Studios (Los Angeles, CA)
- Genre: New wave; synth-pop
- Length: 4:14
- Label: Interscope
- Songwriters: Gwen Stefani; Tony Kanal; Tom Dumont
- Producers: William Orbit; No Doubt

Audio video
- "Making Out" on YouTube

"Making Out" is a song by American band No Doubt from their fifth studio album, Rock Steady (2001). In the Philippines, the song was released as a promotional single and distributed in limited quantities on CDs through Interscope Records. Produced by the band and William Orbit, "Making Out" was written by members Gwen Stefani, Tony Kanal, and Tom Dumont. While recording Rock Steady, the group aimed to work with a variety of musicians during sessions, unlike the processes they had endured for previous albums. Upon working with Orbit, they created a new wave and synth-pop song, with nods to electronic and Europop music.

The lyrics find Stefani discussing her then-relationship with British singer Gavin Rossdale. She expresses a strong distaste for long-distance relationships and yearns for her lover to return home. Critically, "Making Out" drew a mostly negative response from music journalists. It was deemed overproduced and criticized for overly generic lyrics. Some reviewers, however, favorited it for being catchy and lyrically personal. Critics made comparisons between "Making Out" and Stefani's guest appearances on Moby's "South Side" in 2000 and Eve's "Let Me Blow Ya Mind" in 2001.

== Background and release ==
Following the release of the band's fourth studio album, Return of Saturn in 2000, No Doubt set out immediately to begin work on their then-untitled fifth record. While creating the album, the band members refrained from playing instruments they were accustomed to, resulting in songs that contained less guitar and bass guitar, Tom Dumont and Tony Kanal's standard instruments, respectively. They experimented with a reggae sound in several songs, stemming from a creative trip to Jamaica they took in early 2001. While recording the album in both Jamaica and Los Angeles, No Doubt collaborated with a variety of songwriters and producers, in contrast to the creative sessions for previous studio albums such as Return of Saturn. During one session, they worked with English musician William Orbit who was best known for working with Madonna on her electronica-influenced seventh studio album, Ray of Light (1998).

The track was recorded using the digital audio workstation program Pro Tools, which allowed the group to easily work with other producers in Jamaica and London simultaneously. The title of "Making Out" was first revealed as part of the track listing for Rock Steady on October 15, 2001, via No Doubt's official website. Orbit's association with the track as a producer was also revealed. The Orbit and No Doubt-produced track was written by Gwen Stefani, Dumont, and Kanal. "Making Out" was initially released to the public with the rest of Rock Steady on December 11, 2001.

Despite not being released as a commercial single, the song was released as a promotional single in the Philippines in 2002 and distributed in limited quantities as a CD single. In the physical release handled by Interscope Records, the album version of "Making Out" appears as the first track while the previously unreleased Sharam Jey Mix of No Doubt's 2003 single "Running" serves as the bonus track.

== Composition and lyrics ==
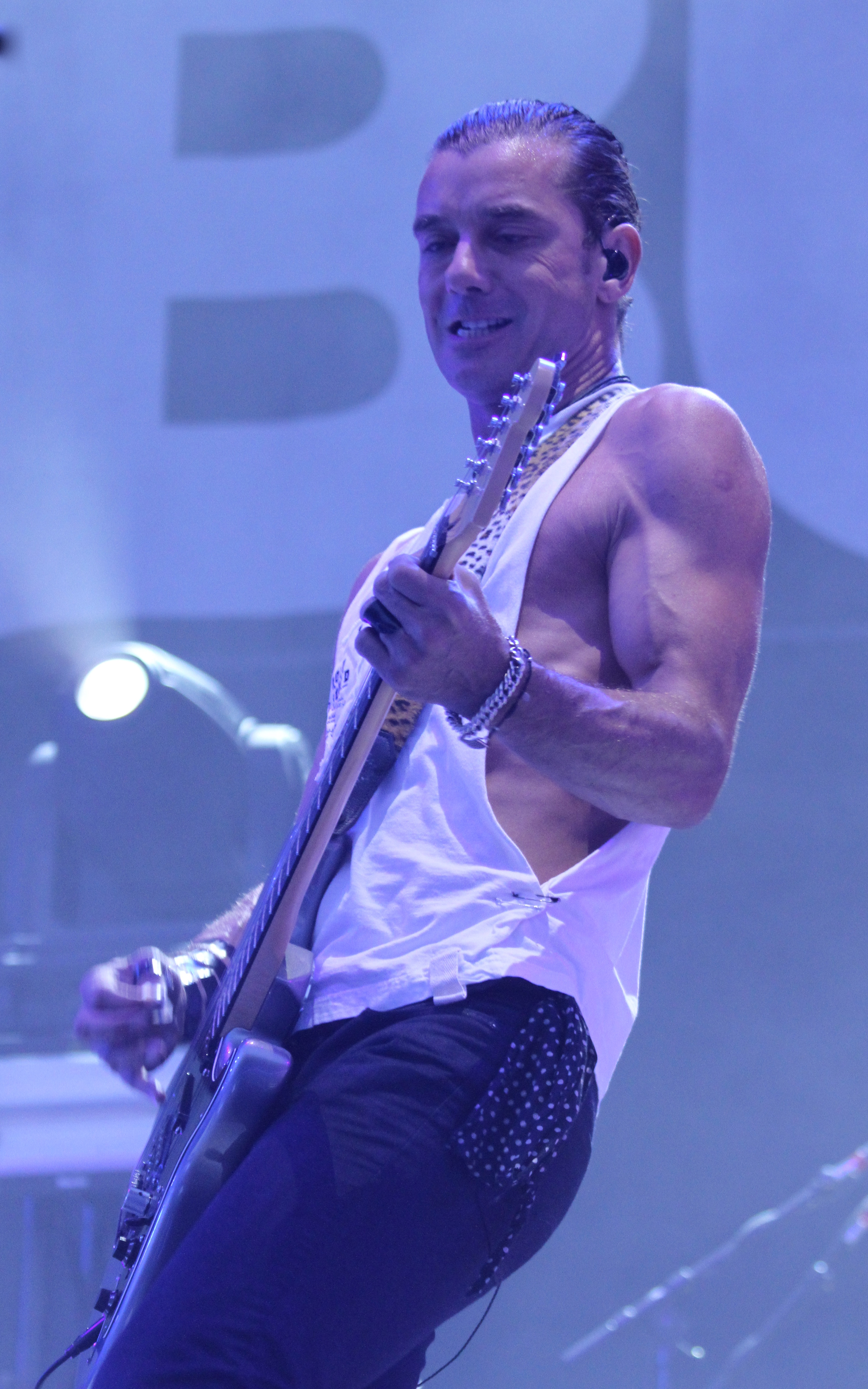
The lyrics of "Making Out" revolve around Gwen Stefani's relationship with her then-boyfriend Gavin Rossdale.

Musically, "Making Out" is a new wave and synth-pop song with an electronic beat. It also contains a rhythm developed alongside an electronically-produced hand clap. Jesse Berrett from Spin referred to the song as an example of the consistent presence of new wave music on Rock Steady; he also noted the use of synths in "Making Out" and described it as a "squirt [of] Europop". Natalie Nichols, a journalist for the Los Angeles Times wrote that Rock Steady is primarily an upbeat album with influence from dance music and considered "Making Out" to be No Doubt's closest attempt at creating an electronica-inspired dance song. Lisa Oliver, a member of Yahoo! Music Radio's LAUNCHcast program, compared No Doubt's song to American singer Rockwell's 1984 single "Somebody's Watching Me".

According to the official sheet music published by Musicnotes.com, "Making Out" is set in common time and has a moderately fast dance tempo of 120 beats per minute. The key of the song is in D major, with Stefani's vocal range spanning an entire octave, from E_{3} to D_{5} in scientific pitch notation. The song progresses in the chord progressions of G–D–A–E in the verses, although a slight distortion is used on the bass. The chorus follows the same set-up, minus the distortion. Instrumentation is provided by No Doubt: Dumont and Kanal perform keyboards in addition to serving as guitarist and bass guitarist, respectively, while Adrian Young plays the drums. Clif Norrell serves as head engineer, assisted by the team of Jeff Kanan, Jennifer Young and mix editors Matt Fields, David Treahearn, and Keith Uddin.

A central theme on Rock Steady is Stefani's relationship with British musician Gavin Rossdale. In several of the album's songs, Stefani sings about her impatience with him and her wanting to establish mutual trust. Lyrically, "Making Out" finds Stefani expressing her dislike of long-distance relationships and requesting for her lover to return home. Disappointed by the absence of her man, she rejects his acts of kindness ("The flowers arrive to my surprise / But that just ain't good enough") and instead conveys a feeling of lovesickness. Upon his arrival home, she predicts to endure kissing sessions to atone for lost time. With widely simple lyrics, Stefani sings in the chorus: "I'm really missing you in so many ways / I anticipate us making out".

== Critical reception ==
Upon its release, "Making Out" received generally negative reviews from music critics. Rob Sheffield from Rolling Stone was disappointed by "Making Out" and Rock Steady track "In My Head", calling both of them lame. Regarding No Doubt's role of songwriting in "Making Out", The A.V. Club's Stephen Thompson criticized Stefani for not being profound; he wrote that the lyrics do not "get much more involved than "'I anticipate us making out'". Oliver from LAUNCHcast agreed, declaring "Making Out" as lyrically dreadful. Joe Costa, a reviewer for Sputnikmusic, disliked the song's overproduction and unfavorably compared it to other Stefani releases. Despite the unfavorable reviews for "Making Out", it drew praise from Spin's Berrett who referred to the song as insanely catchy.

Some reviewers drew comparisons between "Making Out" and Stefani's solo work up to 2002, such as her guest appearance on the remix of Moby's "South Side" (2000) and her duet with Eve titled "Let Me Blow Ya Mind" in 2001. Sputnikmusic's Costa described "Making Out" as a potential B-side to one of Stefani's duets. Eden Miller, writing for PopMatters, made this juxtaposition as well and considered it a favorite among the Rock Steady tracks for sounding exceptionally personal.

== Track listing ==
Philippines promotional CD single
No.	Title	Length
1.	"Making Out"	4:14
2.	"Running" (Sharam Jey Mix)	6:16

== Credits and personnel ==
Credits adapted from the liner notes of Rock Steady.

- No Doubt – production
- Tom Dumont – guitar, keyboards, additional programming
- Matt Fields – assistant mix engineering
- Brian "Big Bass" Gardner – mastering
- John Gould – additional mix programming
- Tony Kanal – bass, keyboards, additional programming
- Jeff Kanan – assistant engineering
- Clif Norrell – engineering
- William Orbit – production
- Sean Spuehler – programming
- Gwen Stefani – vocals, additional programming
- David Treahearn – assistant mix engineering
- Keith Uddin – assistant mix engineering
- Paul "P Dub" Watson – mix programming
- Eric White – additional programming
- Wayne Wilkins – mix programming
- Adrian Young – drums
- Jennifer Young – assistant engineering

== Release history ==
Release dates and formats for "Making Out"
Region	Date	Format	Label	Ref.
Philippines	2002	Promotional CD	Interscope	
