= Running (No Doubt song) =

2003 single by No Doubt

Single by No Doubt

from the album Rock Steady
- Released: January 27, 2003
- Recorded: 2001
- Studio: The Sideshack (Los Angeles); Record Plant (Los Angeles)
- Genre: Synthpop
- Length: 4:01
- Label: Interscope
- Songwriters: Gwen Stefani; Tony Kanal
- Producers: Nellee Hooper; No Doubt

No Doubt singles chronology
"Underneath It All" (2002)	"Running" (2003)	"It's My Life" (2003)

Music video
- "Running" on YouTube

Running is a song by American rock band No Doubt from their fifth studio album, Rock Steady (2001). Written by band members Gwen Stefani and Tony Kanal, the song was released as the album's fourth and final single on January 27, 2003, by Interscope Records. The song was also used in the final episode of the American television series Sabrina, the Teenage Witch in 2003.

"Running" received mixed reviews from music critics and was compared to the work of Depeche Mode. The single only charted on the official charts of the United States, where it became the band's lowest-charting single, and in Germany, where it had its longest-charting period. The accompanying music video was directed by Chris Hafner, featuring many old and new pictures as well as clippings of the band members.

== Background and writing ==
The song was written by lead singer Gwen Stefani and bassist Tony Kanal in Kanal's living room. They used an old Yamaha keyboard that Kanal's father had purchased for him when he was in eighth grade and developed the song's harmony first and then wrote the lyrics. The band worked on the track to give it a "spacier sound" but were displeased with the result so they took the song to producer Nellee Hooper, who stripped Running down to the basics. The song was then produced by Hooper, with whom Stefani collaborated again for her solo project two years later. Whatever the intent, the result was a track that resonated with catchy "Mario Bros." background instrumentation throughout the entire song.

== Critical reception ==
"Running" received mixed reviews from music critics. Blender characterized the song as "twenty-first-century Blondie" and compared its synthesizers and restrained vocal to the work of Depeche Mode. Rolling Stone also made the comparison to Depeche Mode and compared the song's "two-finger synth riff" to the work of Yazoo and Erasure. PopMatters, however, stated that the song fell short and was more appropriate for "some Britney clone". Stylus Magazine agreed, calling "Running" sophomoric, and commented that "this is the kind of song that makes Gwen so popular with the pre-teen girlies." Slant Magazine described the song as a "super-polished Saturn leftover", and Entertainment Weekly portrayed the song as a paean in which No Doubt performed inside a music box, remarking that "it could be a contender for the coolest wedding song ever."

== Commercial performance ==
"Running" was commercially unsuccessful in the United States, while the previous singles from the album reached the top 20 of the Billboard Hot 100. The single debuted at number 62 and stayed there for two weeks; it was unable to reach a higher position, becoming the band's lowest-charting single on the chart. It dropped off the chart after six weeks. The single was more successful in mainstream and adult contemporary markets, reaching number 20 on the Adult Top 40 and Top 40 Mainstream charts. It followed a similar charting pattern on the German Singles Chart where it debuted as well, peaking at number 55 before falling off the chart after seven weeks.

== Music video ==
A scene from the music video featuring the band members at the beach

The song was accompanied by a music video which was directed by Chris Hafner. The video opens with a scene of the band members walking on the beach in which Stefani is seen wearing a polka-dot gown and the other members are seen in casual clothes. The scene is interrupted by various pictures of the band members in their early years with old pictures of Stefani in which she has her original brunette hair. The scene then again shifts to the beach where the band members are shown playing frisbee and are shown having fun while burying drummist Adrian Young in the sand. Later, Stefani is shown sitting on a rock by the sea and singing to the camera. There are many other pictures of the band holding platinum and gold records and Adrian shown playing the guitar nude. There are also several clippings of the band making music in the studio and performing on stage during the Rock Steady Tour. The video ends with the band members running into the sea water.

== Track listing ==
- German CD maxi-single
1. "Running" (album version) – 4:02
2. "Hella Good" (live) – 5:41
3. "Underneath It All" (live) – 4:40
4. "Hey Baby" (live) – 3:44

== Charts ==
Weekly chart performance for "Running"
Chart (2003)	Peak position
Germany (GfK)	55
US Billboard Hot 100	62
US Adult Pop Airplay (Billboard)	20
US Pop Airplay (Billboard)	20

== Release history ==
Release dates and formats for "Running"
Region	Date	Format	Label	Ref.
United States	January 27, 2003	Contemporary hit radio	Interscope	
