= Rap opera =

Music genre

A rap opera or hip-hop opera (also known as a hip hopera, hip-hopera, hiphopera, or rapera), is a musical work in hip-hop style with operatic form. The terms have been used to describe both dramatic works and concept albums, and hip hopera has also been used for works drawing more heavily on contemporary R&B than other hip hop such as rap.

== Etymology ==
The word hip hopera is a portmanteau of hip hop and opera. An early use of the phrase was a 1994 album of that name by Volume 10 (although not a concept album). The first dramatic production to use the term was a 2001 telefilm by MTV, titled Carmen: A Hip Hopera. The word received increased use after 2005, in describing R&B singer R. Kelly's Trapped in the Closet series.

== History ==
Rap opera, also known as hip-hopera, is a hybrid genre between rap and opera. Opera is a musical genre that began in the late 16th century. Hip hop is a much newer musical genre that became popular during the 1970s. Historically, both rap and opera have been used as a form of expression and storytelling. Now, in popular culture, the fusion of the two genres is being used for the same purpose. Historically popular and classic pieces such as Carmen and Romeo and Juliet have been transformed into hip hop pieces.

== In popular culture ==
The use of hip hopera in popular culture began in 1997 when hip hop group The Fugees and Bounty Killer collaborated on a musical single titled "Hip-Hopera." In 2001, the film Carmen: A Hip Hopera, a modern rendition of Georges Bizet's 1875 opera Carmen, aired on MTV. The film featured Destiny's Child frontwoman Beyoncé Knowles, as well as other rappers and modern-day musicians, and was renowned as "the first hip hop musical." Rome & Jewel, a 2006 Rennie Harris film is another hip hop rendition of William Shakespeare's Romeo and Juliet. In 2023, American rapper Latto and pop singer Christina Aguilera released a rap opera-inspired song for the food delivery company Just Eat.

Rap opera is also being used in communities through local organizations such as the Rap Opera Project. Carlos Aguirre, the creator of the Rap Opera Project, teaches rap opera to marginalized and at risk youth in his community. The project's intention is to give voice to individuals who have otherwise felt oppressed. Aguirre, channeling his own personal experience and youth as a minority, is using musical expression as a form of therapy. In the United Kingdom, traditional opera is adopting modern hip hop beats to appeal to the modern youth. The Moon Prince: A Rap Opera, is another community-led rap opera for youth featured in Charlotte and Boston.

== Reception ==
There have been mixed responses to the usage of rap opera. Theater critic Steven Oxman gave his feedback on Carmen: A Hip Hopera, stating "Carmen is MTV's first 'Hip Hopera', and while that phrase may be way too cute for its own good, this reworking of Bizet's opera into a contemporary, hip-hop musical works quite well, and represents one of the more original recent efforts to create a new form from an old one."

== See also ==
- Rock opera
