= My Xperience =

Studio album by Bounty Killer
- Released: September 17, 1996
- Genres: Dancehall; ragga
- Length: 1:12:40
- Labels: VP; TVT
- Producers: Johnny Wonder (exec.); Bounty Killer (also exec.); Anthony Red Rose; Anthony Malvo; Erick Sermon; Jah Screw; King Jammy; RZA; Sly and Robbie

Bounty Killer chronology
No Argument (1995)	My Xperience (1996)	Ghetto Gramma (1997)

My Xperience is a reggae album by Jamaican dancehall performer Bounty Killer, released in 1996 (see 1996 in music). Bounty Killer was one of dancehall's biggest stars in the 1990s and his harsh hip-hop-influenced songs made him a controversial figure. Most of the songs on My Xperience are morose tales of poverty and violence. The album featured the single "Hip-Hopera" (featuring Fugees).

The album was listed in the 1999 book The Rough Guide: Reggae: 100 Essential CDs.

== Reception ==
The AllMusic review by Alex Henderson awarded the album 4.5 stars stating "Those who aren't big dancehall fans may find the hip-hop-influenced CD hard to get into; those who are heavily into it will find a lot to admire on My Xperience, which contains major dancehall hits like "Living Dangerously" and "Virgin Island". A variety of guests join Bounty—everyone from the Fugees on "Hip-Hopera" to reggae singer Barrington Levy on "Living Dangerously" to hardcore rapper Jeru the Damaja on "Suicide or Murder". Granted, dancehall has its limitations and can wear thin after awhile [sic], but even so, My Xperience makes for an exhilarating listen".

Professional ratings
Review scores
Source	Rating
AllMusic	4.5/5 stars
Muzik	10/10
NME	8/10
RapReviews	8.5/10
Spin	8/10

== Track listing ==
No.	Title	Writer(s)	Producer(s)	Length
1.	"Fed Up"	Rodney Price; Ivy Williams; Lowell Dunbar	Sly & Robbie	3:47
2.	"The Lord Is My Light and Salvation"	Price; I. Williams; Morris Wellington	King Jammys	3:40
3.	"Hip-Hopera ("Mr. Punk")" (featuring the Fugees)	Price; Wyclef Jean; Lauryn Hill; Prakazrel Michel; I. Williams	Wyclef Jean; Lauryn Hill; Jerry Duplessis (co.)	4:17
4.	"Guns & Roses" (featuring Anthony Malvo and Anthony Red Rose)	Price; Anthony Malvo; Anthony Cameron; I. Williams	Anthony Malvo; Anthony Red Rose	3:24
5.	"Mama (Scare Dem Version)"	Price; Paul Yebuah	Bounty Killer	3:15
6.	"Change Like the Weather" (featuring Junior Reid and Busta Rhymes)	Price; Delroy Reid; Trevor Smith; Erick Sermon	Erick Sermon	4:27
7.	"War Beyond the Stars"	Price; I. Williams; Cleveland Browne; Wycliffe Johnson	Bounty Killer	4:01
8.	"Living Dangerously" (featuring Barrington Levy)	Price; Barrington Levy; Paul Love; Harry Hyams; Winston Sela	Jah Screw	3:39
9.	"War Face (Ask Fi War) Remix" (featuring Raekwon)	Price; Corey Woods; Robert Diggs	RZA	3:41
10.	"Marathon ("To Chicago")"	Price; Yebuah	Bounty Killer	3:24
11.	"Revolution III" (featuring Beenie Man and Dennis Brown)	Price; Moses Davis; Dennis Brown; Dunbar; Robbie Shakespeare	Sly & Robbie	4:04
12.	"Gun Down"	Price; Winston Riley; I. Williams	Bounty Killer	3:21
13.	"Mi Nature"	Price; I. Williams	Sly & Robbie	3:21
14.	"Virgin Island"	Price; Yebuah	Bounty Killer	2:58
15.	"Who Send Dem"	Price; Yebuah	Bounty Killer	3:14
16.	"Seek God (Remix)" (featuring Junior Reid)	Price; Reid	Bounty Killer	4:04
17.	"Maniac" (featuring Richie Stephens)	Price; Richie Stephens; Michael Sembello; Dennis Matkosky	Richie Stephens	4:00
18.	"Suicide or Murder" (featuring Jeru the Damaja)	Price; Kendrick Davis; I. Williams	Bobby Konders; Blahzay Blahzay; D.J. Nassi	3:21
19.	"Benz & the Bimma"	Price; I. Williams; Dunbar	Aidan Jones	3:11
20.	"My Experience"	Price; Yebuah	Bounty Killer	3:31
Total length:				1:12:40

== Personnel ==
- Rodney "Bounty Killer" Price – main artist, producer, arranger, engineer, executive producer
- Nel Ust Wyclef Jean – featured artist, producer, arranger, engineer, mixing
- Lauryn Hill – featured artist, producer, arranger
- Prakazrel "Pras" Michel – featured artist
- Anthony Malvo – featured artist, producer, arranger
- Anthony "Red Rose" Cameron – featured artist, producer, arranger
- Delroy "Junior" Reid – featured artist
- Trevor "Busta Rhymes" Smith – featured artist
- Barrington Levy – featured artist
- Corey "Raekwon" Woods – featured artist
- Moses "Beenie Man" Davis – featured artist
- Dennis Brown – featured artist
- Richie Stephens – featured artist, producer
- Kendrick "Jeru the Damaja" Davis – featured artist
- Lowell "Sly" Dunbar – producer, arranger
- Robbie Shakespeare – producer, arranger
- Lloyd "King Jammy" James – producer, arranger
- Jerry "Wonda" Duplessis – co-producer
- Erick Sermon – producer, arranger
- Paul "Jah Screw" Love – producer
- Robert "RZA" Diggs – producer, arranger, engineer
- Bobby Konders – producer, arranger
- Blahzay Blahzay – producer, arranger
- Aidan Jones – producer, arranger
- John "Johnny Wonder" Scilipoti – executive producer, editing, project coordinator
- Warren Riker – engineering, mixing
- Selwyn "4th Disciple" Bougard – engineer
- Paul "Jazzwad" Yebuah – engineer
- David Cole – engineer
- Collin "Bulby" York – mixing
- Chris Scott – mastering
- Paul Shields – mastering
- Leroy Champaign – art direction, design
- Tim Carter – photography
- Backra – engineer, mixing
- Computer Paul
- The Firehouse Crew
- Dean Fraser
- Troy Hightower – engineer
- Lynford "Fatta" Marshall – engineer, mixing
- David Sanguinetti – project coordinator
- Lloyd "Gitsy" Willis
- Kirk – engineer, mixing
- Banton – engineer, mixing
- Joel Chin – compilation, editing
- James Goring – project coordinator
- Fat Man – engineer, mixing

== Charts ==
Chart performance for My Xperience
Chart (1996)	Peak position
US Billboard 200	145
US Top R&B/Hip-Hop Albums (Billboard)	27
US Heatseekers Albums (Billboard)	6
US Reggae Albums (Billboard)	1
