= Hip-Hopera (song) =

1997 single by Bounty Killer featuring the Fugees

Single by Bounty Killer featuring Fugees

from the album My Xperience
- Released: February 11, 1997
- Recorded: 1996
- Genre: Dancehall; hip-hop; rap opera
- Length: 4:10
- Label: VP Records
- Songwriters: Wyclef Jean; Lauryn Hill; Pras Michel; Rodney Price; Ivy Williams
- Producers: Wyclef Jean; Lauryn Hill; Jerry Duplessis

Bounty Killer singles chronology
"Change Like the Weather" (1996)	"Hip-Hopera" (1997)	"Deadly Zone" (1997)

"Hip-Hopera" is a song by Jamaican dancehall artist Bounty Killer, featuring American hip-hop group Fugees. It was released by VP records, on February 11, 1997. The song is included on the album My Xperience (1996). "Hip-Hopera" blends elements of dancehall and hip-hop with operatic themes. It is considered one of the earliest examples of the rap opera genre.

The song spent five weeks on the Billboard Hot 100, peaking at number 81.

== Background and release ==
"Hip-Hopera" was recorded during the late 1990s, a period when both Bounty Killer and Fugees were at the height of their commercial success. The track was included on Bounty Killer's third studio album, My Xperience, and was released on February 11, 1997.

"Hip-Hopera" entered the Billboard Hot 100, where it spent five weeks and peaked at number 81.

== Composition ==
The song combines a reggae-inspired beat with rap and soulful vocals. The Fugees deliver rap verses, complemented by Wyclef Jean and Lauryn Hill's harmonies and Bounty Killer's dramatic delivery. Its lyrics address themes of resilience, cultural identity, and perseverance.

The title "Hip-Hopera" refers to its blend of hip-hop and dramatic, operatic elements. Although the song does not strictly follow the structure of classical opera, its theatrical nature, production and background vocals hinted at the genre's storytelling.

== Legacy ==
The song is regarded as one of the earliest examples of the rap opera genre, with The New York Times attributing its unique blend to paving the way for the 2001 television film Carmen: A Hip Hopera, which starred Beyoncé and featured a cameo by Wyclef Jean of Fugees. The genre would later be explored more fully in projects like Trapped in the Closet (2005) by R. Kelly, and the TikTok viral promotional track "Did Somebody Say HipOpera" (2023) by Latto and Christina Aguilera.

Bounty Killer played the song during Round 7 of his Verzuz battle against fellow dancehall artist Beenie Man, in May 2020.

== Charts ==
Chart performance for "Hip-Hopera"
Chart (1997)	Peak position
US Billboard Hot 100	81
US Hot R&B/Hip-Hop Songs (Billboard)	54
US Rap Songs (Billboard)	14

== Release history ==
Region	Date	Format(s)	Label(s)	Ref.
United States	February 11, 1997	Rhythmic contemporary radio	VP Records	
