= Rock Steady (album) =

2001 studio album by No Doubt

Studio album by No Doubt
- Released: December 11, 2001
- Recorded: July 1999, (Note: Track 12) January–June 2001
- Studios: Record Plant (Los Angeles) (Note: Tracks 2, 6 and 9); Home Recordings (London) (Note: Tracks 2, 6, 10 and 13); Toast (San Francisco) (Note: Track 3); The Sideshack (Los Angeles) (Note: Tracks 3, 4, 6–9, 11 and 13); Geejam (Port Antonio, Jamaica) (Note: Tracks 3, 5 and 8); One Pop (Kingston, Jamaica) (Note: Tracks 3 and 5); Westlake Audio (Los Angeles) (Note: Tracks 4, 7 and 11); Guerilla Canyon (Los Angeles) (Note: Track 4); 7 Dials (London) (Note: Track 5); Rothwell Street Flat (London) (Note: Track 6); Paisley Park (Chanhassen, Minnesota); 11AD (Los Angeles); Olympic (London)
- Genres: Electropop; dancehall; reggae; new wave; dance-pop
- Length: 49:02
- Label: Interscope
- Producers: Nellee Hooper; No Doubt; Ric Ocasek; William Orbit; Prince; Sly & Robbie; Steely & Clevie

No Doubt chronology
Return of Saturn (2000)	Rock Steady (2001)	The Singles 1992–2003 (2003)

Singles from Rock Steady
- 1. "Hey Baby" Released: October 29, 2001; 2. "Hella Good" Released: April 13, 2002; 3. "Underneath It All" Released: July 22, 2002; 4. "Running" Released: January 27, 2003

Rock Steady is the fifth studio album by American rock band No Doubt, released on December 11, 2001, by Interscope Records. The band began writing the album with initial recording sessions in Los Angeles and San Francisco, then traveled to London and Jamaica to work with various performers, songwriters, and producers. Sly & Robbie, the Neptunes, and William Orbit were among the many artists the band collaborated with on the album.

As a result of these collaborations, Rock Steady touches on many musical styles, focusing on electropop, dancehall, and new wave. The band attempted to capture the vibe of Jamaican dancehall music, and experimented with writing songs without its standard instrumentation. Lead vocalist Gwen Stefani wrote her lyrics quickly in comparison to previous records, and dealt with topics ranging from partying to ruminations on her relationship with Gavin Rossdale.

Rock Steady received mostly positive reviews from critics, and was nominated for Best Pop Vocal Album at the 2003 Grammy Awards. The album was a commercial comeback for the band, surpassing sales of their previous album Return of Saturn (2000). Rock Steady spawned four singles, two of which won the Grammy Award for Best Pop Performance by a Duo or Group with Vocal. Rolling Stone ranked Rock Steady number 316 on its 2003 list of "The 500 Greatest Albums of All Time".

== Background and production ==
Every night on the tour to support their 2000 album Return of Saturn, No Doubt threw after-show parties where people danced to Jamaican dancehall music. During a discussion over dinner in late 2000, the band members decided they wanted to explore dancehall-style rhythms for their next album. Drawing inspiration from artists such as Bounty Killer, Cutty Ranks, and Mr. Vegas, the band began work on the album in January 2001 by creating beats on Pro Tools at guitarist Tom Dumont's apartment. The group often tried recreating beats from other song files on the computer, which resulted in modified versions of the original rhythms. They worked with producer Philip Steir at Toast Studios in San Francisco during this time, where the beginnings of "Hey Baby" emerged. When writing lyrics for previous albums, Stefani typically read works by Sylvia Plath that would make her depressed "or find different words that inspire me." In contrast, for Rock Steady she wrote the lyrics quicker and on the spot to meet the goal of writing a song a day. Many of the demos recorded during these early sessions were used in the final tracks, rather than completely reworking the songs. The band saw this as a way to preserve the "initial spark" from when the songs were conceived.

The next month, Stefani left Los Angeles for London to visit boyfriend Rossdale, and the band traveled with her to finish recording "Detective". There, they worked with Eurythmics member David A. Stewart and wrote the song "Underneath It All" in only 10 minutes. In March, No Doubt traveled to Jamaica, staying at the Blue Lagoon in Port Antonio. The band "spent most of the time swimming and getting sunburned and drinking and smoking and recording a little music", according to Dumont. The group would often have Red Stripe beers or rum and cokes with jerk food for breakfast; on one occasion, Dumont passed out from heavy drinking while recording a track. They began work in the mid-afternoon and worked into the night, with an after-party following the session. The group collaborated with Sly & Robbie, who produced "Underneath It All" and "Hey Baby" and brought in dancehall toasters Lady Saw and Bounty Killer, and Steely & Clevie, who produced "Start the Fire".

The band returned from Jamaica and resumed work in June 2001, collaborating with producers Nellee Hooper and Timbaland. The Timbaland track, titled "It's a Fight", and a Dr. Dre-produced song titled "Wicked Day" were excluded from the album because their hip-hop sounds did not work well on the album. The band then worked with producer and former Cars frontman Ric Ocasek in late June. Stefani commented that No Doubt worked with so many people for the record because none were available for the time needed to make an LP, but that she would have liked to work with Ocasek longer. The band and its A&R manager Mark Williams chose collaborators based on how well they thought the person would fit the personality of the song that No Doubt had written. In late August, the band returned to London for Mark "Spike" Stent to polish off the songs with audio mixing.

== Music and lyrics ==
The band members often did not play their standard instruments when working on the songs for Rock Steady. As a result, the album's instrumentation contains less guitar and bass guitar than the band's previous work. Many of the album's sounds come from electronic keyboard effects, which bassist Tony Kanal called "Devo-y bleeps and Star Wars noises". Dumont commented that many of the effects came from being unfamiliar with the equipment and "just twiddling knobs". Dumont created an effect similar to that of an echo chamber by placing a microphone inside a metal garbage can with the can's open end facing a drum kit. Richard B. Simon of MTV News asserted that the sound of Rock Steady was part of the decade nostalgia of the 1980s retro movement.

Stefani's vocals range from innocent to seductive, sometimes transitioning from one to the other within a song. Her lyrics are based on her relationship with Rossdale, whom she married less than a year after the album's release. Stefani is openhearted and unreserved as on Return of Saturn, but her approach becomes more immediate and instinctive. The lyrics are more youthful than those on Return of Saturn and detail partying and feelings of lust. An overarching theme on the album is Stefani's impatience in the couple's long-distance relationship. She discusses wanting to see Rossdale on "Making Out" and "Waiting Room", and she reveals her distrust in Rossdale on "In My Head". On "Hey Baby" she gives an innocuous account of the debauchery between her bandmates and their groupies during parties, as she observes the party. The lyrics of "Underneath It All" question whether or not Rossdale is a good match for her, an issue resolved in the chorus, which was written based on a journal entry where Stefani wrote the line "You're lovely underneath it all" about Rossdale.

== Composition ==
Musically, Rock Steady incorporates electropop, dancehall, new wave, reggae, and dance-pop. The album maintains many of the styles present in No Doubt's previous work, while introducing influences from the music of Jamaica. "Hey Baby", "Underneath It All" and "Start the Fire" all feature dancehall and ragga, an electronic-oriented subgenre, as well as guest toasters. The latter, written using backward string samples, also contains the band's traditional ska and reggae sounds. Ocasek produced the new wave-influenced tracks "Don't Let Me Down" and "Platinum Blonde Life", the former of which was described as sounding "more like the Cars than the Cars". "Platinum Blonde Life" was so strongly influenced by the Cars' work that Kanal apologized to Ocasek, though Ocasek apologized back that he had not seen the similarity. The synth-pop ballad "Running" was composed on a Yamaha keyboard purchased for Kanal in the 1980s and drew inspiration from the Thompson Twins. Its simple keyboard riff drew comparisons to the work of Depeche Mode, Erasure, and Yazoo.

Because of the number of collaborations, the album touches on several other styles. "Waiting Room", a song written and sung with Prince for Return of Saturn, evokes his R&B style over a drum and bass beat. "Hella Good", an electro-rock song co-written with hip hop production duo the Neptunes, is inspired by the funk songs of the late 1970s such as Queen's "Another One Bites the Dust" and the Commodores' "Brick House". William Orbit, best known for his work on Madonna's electronica-oriented 1998 album Ray of Light, incorporates trance music in the production of "Making Out". "Detective", one of the five tracks produced by Hooper, takes slight influence from pop music. The album's title track closes the album by tying together the many musical themes. It is a slow dub song, with acid house-style bleeps and moans.

== Release and promotion ==
"Hey Baby" was released as the lead single from Rock Steady in October 2001. The song peaked number at five on the Billboard Hot 100, while reaching the top five in New Zealand and the United Kingdom, and the top 10 in Australia, Denmark, Finland, Germany, and Norway. The positive response to "Hey Baby" from radio stations and video channels prompted the band to push forward the release of Rock Steady from December 18 to December 11. The album's second single, "Hella Good", was released on April 13, 2002, reaching number 13 on the Billboard Hot 100. It also charted at number eight in Australia and number 12 in the UK.

"Underneath It All" was released as the third single on August 15, 2002. It became No Doubt's highest-peaking single in the US to date, reaching number three on the Billboard Hot 100. Internationally, the single saw limited success, reaching number eight in New Zealand, number 18 in the UK and number 28 in Australia. "Running" was released as the album's fourth and final single on July 1, 2003. Peaking at number 62, "Running" became the band's lowest-peaking single on the Billboard Hot 100 to date.

Following the success of the standard edition, two reissues of Rock Steady—a limited edition and a special edition—were released in October 2002, each of which including a bonus disc. The limited edition, released in North America, features acoustic live performances of "Underneath It All" and "Just a Girl" recorded at 1LIVE in Cologne, Germany, in June 2002, as well as the music video for "Underneath It All". The special edition, released in Europe, includes a remix of "Hey Baby" featuring Outkast and Killer Mike and another remix by F.A.B.Z.; Roger Sanchez's remix of "Hella Good", which won a Grammy Award for Best Remixed Recording, Non-Classical in 2003; and a remix of Return of Saturn's lead single "Ex-Girlfriend" by Philip Steir, who helped produce "Hey Baby". The songs from the two-song bonus disc were released through North American iTunes Stores, and those from the four-song bonus disc were released in other countries. Rock Steady Live, a live DVD of No Doubt performing in 2002 in support of Rock Steady, was released in November 2003.

== Critical reception ==
Professional ratings
Aggregate scores
Source	Rating
Metacritic	69/100
Review scores
Source	Rating
AllMusic	4/5 stars
Blender	3/5 stars
Entertainment Weekly	B+
The Guardian	4/5 stars
Los Angeles Times	2.5/4 stars
NME	7/10
Q	3/5 stars
Rolling Stone	3.5/5 stars
Slant Magazine	4.5/5 stars
Spin	8/10

Rock Steady received generally positive reviews from music critics. At Metacritic, which assigns a normalized rating out of 100 to reviews from mainstream publications, the album received an average score of 69, based on 15 reviews. Rolling Stone's Rob Sheffield wrote it was "impressive to hear No Doubt summon the musical imagination to transcend the formula that used to imprison them". Stephen Thomas Erlewine of AllMusic referred to the album as "a good, hooky, stylish mainstream pop record". David Browne of Entertainment Weekly remarked that there was "something oddly flimsy" about No Doubt that prevented it from becoming a milestone in pop music, but that the band's "party-throwing skills improve with each new gathering." Colleen Delaney of Stylus Magazine commented that the band sounded like it had "growing pains" and was unsure of its place in mainstream rock, predicting that No Doubt would either become a singles band "or go all Radiohead on us and make an album of avant-jazz-electro-acid-funk-polka."

Many reviewers focused on the large number of styles that Rock Steady incorporates. Eden Miller of PopMatters, noting that Rock Steady maintains the introspection of Return of Saturn without the latter's "longing and wistfulness", stated that "it is to No Doubt's credit...that they manage to keep the album together with little more than their collective personalities." Blender, however, called it "an intermittently engaging but overall shapeless collection...the product of happy-go-lucky musicians who once cavorted in bad track suits but now spend their days commuting between London, Jamaica and Los Angeles seeking the wisdom of expensive studio geeks." Alex Needham of NME viewed the album's "enormous waterfront of styles" positively, noting that it had many strong potential singles, but found that some of the "empty-headed guitar pop" on the second half of the album spoiled the listening experience. Kimberly Reyes of Time stated that Rock Steady was able to integrate ska, pop, New Wave, and dancehall "without sounding contrived or chaotic". Reyes added that though the album lacked the energy and sales of No Doubt's 1995 breakthrough album Tragic Kingdom, Rock Steady was "their greatest effort to date...the sound of band dropping pretense to realize its potential." Sal Cinquemani of Slant Magazine commenting that "[n]ot since Blondie [...] has a rock act so effortlessly, irreverently, and fashionably skidded across so many different genre boundaries at one time." Lisa Oliver of LAUNCHcast said the album was good but didn't match the band's early work, adding that "even with so many producers attempting to steer this bus along the superstar highway, they end up in a better-than-most parking lot".

== Accolades ==
Rock Steady was ranked number 316 on Rolling Stone's list of "The 500 Greatest Albums of All Time" in November 2003. Blender included the album on its April 2003 list of "500 CDs You Must Own Before You Die!". In June 2003, it was included on Slant Magazine's list of "50 Essential Pop Albums"

"Hey Baby" won the award for Best Pop Performance by a Duo or Group with Vocals at the 45th Annual Grammy Awards, while Rock Steady and "Hella Good" received nominations for Best Pop Vocal Album and Best Dance Recording, respectively. At the following year's ceremony, "Underneath It All" earned the band their second consecutive Grammy Award for Best Pop Performance by a Duo or Group with Vocals.

== Commercial performance ==
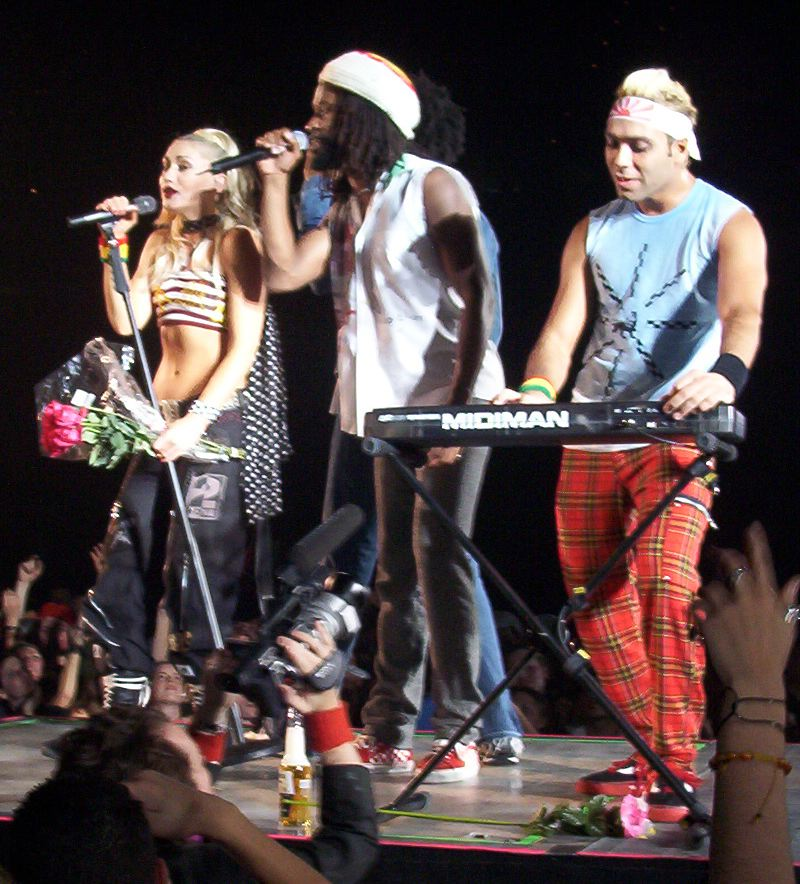
Stefani, Stephen Bradley, and Kanal performing on the Rock Steady Tour in March 2002

NME reviewer Alex Needham compared the album's revival of No Doubt's popularity to the performance of Madonna's 1998 album Ray of Light. Rock Steady debuted at number nine on the Billboard 200, selling 254,000 copies in its first week. Rock Steady was certified double platinum by the Recording Industry Association of America (RIAA) on October 11, 2002, and by July 2012, it had sold 2,842,000 copies in the United States.

The album was moderately successful outside the US. In Australia, it peaked at number 15 on the ARIA Albums Chart and spent nine non-consecutive weeks in the top 40. The album was certified gold by the Australian Recording Industry Association (ARIA). The album reached number 43 on the UK Albums Chart, and was certified gold by the British Phonographic Industry (BPI) on July 22, 2013. It was also certified platinum by the Canadian Recording Industry Association (CRIA) on September 3, 2002. As of November 2003, Rock Steady had sold three million copies worldwide.

== Legacy and influence ==
When singer-songwriter Jewel released her fifth album 0304 in June 2003, reinventing and sexualizing her public image, music critics identified Rock Steady and Ray of Light as influences on the album. Slant Magazine compared 0304's retro tribute to new wave music with that on Rock Steady. Blender commented that Jewel had "brushed up on two sacred pop texts, the Manual of Madonna and the Gospel According to Gwen". The magazine compared her use of a more restrained, throaty purr to Stefani's vocals and noted 0304's use of "jumpy bubblegum choruses and boop-boop-beeping keyboards" as descendants of No Doubt's production.

== Track listing ==
No.	Title	Writer(s)	Producer(s)	Length
1.	"Intro"			0:27
2.	"Hella Good"	Gwen Stefani; Pharrell Williams; Chad Hugo; Tony Kanal	Nellee Hooper; No Doubt	4:02
3.	"Hey Baby" (featuring Bounty Killer)	Stefani; Kanal; Tom Dumont; Rodney Price	Sly & Robbie; No Doubt; Mark "Spike" Stent^{[a]}; Philip Steir^{[a]}	3:26
4.	"Making Out"	Stefani; Kanal; Dumont	William Orbit; No Doubt	4:14
5.	"Underneath It All" (featuring Lady Saw)	Stefani; David Stewart	Sly & Robbie; No Doubt; Stent^{[a]}	5:02
6.	"Detective"	Stefani; Kanal; Dumont	Hooper; No Doubt	2:53
7.	"Don't Let Me Down"	Stefani; Kanal; Dumont	Ric Ocasek; No Doubt; Stent^{[a]}	4:08
8.	"Start the Fire"	Stefani; Kanal; Dumont	Steely & Clevie; No Doubt	4:08
9.	"Running"	Stefani; Kanal	Hooper; No Doubt	4:01
10.	"In My Head"	Stefani; Kanal; Dumont	Hooper; No Doubt	3:25
11.	"Platinum Blonde Life"	Stefani; Kanal; Dumont	No Doubt; Ocasek; Stent^{[a]}	3:27
12.	"Waiting Room"	Prince; Stefani; Kanal; Dumont	Prince; No Doubt; Stent^{[a]}	4:27
13.	"Rock Steady"	Stefani; Kanal	Hooper; No Doubt	5:22

US and Canadian iTunes Store bonus tracks
No.	Title	Writer(s)	Length
14.	"Underneath It All" (Radio 1LIVE acoustic version)	Stefani; Stewart	3:45
15.	"Just a Girl" (Radio 1LIVE acoustic version)	Stefani; Dumont	3:34

International iTunes Store limited edition bonus tracks
No.	Title	Writer(s)	Length
1.	"Hey Baby" (Stank Remix featuring Outkast and Killer Mike)	Stefani; Kanal; Dumont; Price	4:07
2.	"Hey Baby" (Fabian Remix)	Stefani; Kanal; Dumont; Price	3:47
3.	"Hella Good" (Roger's Release Yourself Mix)	Stefani; Williams; Hugo; Kanal	7:14
4.	"Ex-Girlfriend" (Philip Steir Remix)	Stefani; Dumont; Kanal	5:10

US limited edition bonus disc
No.	Title	Writer(s)	Length
1.	"Underneath It All" (Radio 1LIVE acoustic version)	Stefani; Stewart	3:44
2.	"Just a Girl" (Radio 1LIVE acoustic version)	Stefani; Dumont	3:32
3.	"Underneath It All" (music video)

UK & EU special/limited edition bonus disc
No.	Title	Writer(s)	Length
1.	"Hey Baby" (Stank Remix featuring Outkast and Killer Mike) (dirty version)	Stefani; Kanal; Dumont; Price	4:10
2.	"Hey Baby" (The Homeboy Mix)	Stefani; Kanal; Dumont; Price	3:50
3.	"Hella Good" (Roger's Release Yourself Mix)	Stefani; Williams; Hugo; Kanal	7:16
4.	"Ex-Girlfriend" (The Psycho Ex Mix)	Stefani; Dumont; Kanal	5:13
5.	"Hey Baby" (music video)
6.	"Hella Good" (music video)
7.	"Underneath It All" (music video)

=== Notes ===
- ^{^[a]} signifies an additional producer

== Personnel ==
Credits adapted from the liner notes of Rock Steady.

=== No Doubt ===
- Gwen Stefani – vocals (all tracks); additional programming (tracks 4, 13)
- Tony Kanal – bass guitar, keyboards (all tracks); programming (track 3); additional programming (tracks 4, 6, 9, 13); saxophone (track 5)
- Tom Dumont – guitar, keyboards (all tracks); programming (tracks 3, 7, 8, 11); additional programming (tracks 4, 6, 9, 13)
- Adrian Young – drums

=== Additional musicians ===
- Bounty Killer – vocals (track 3)
- Fabien Waltmann – programming (tracks 2, 6, 9, 10, 13)
- Sly Dunbar – programming (track 3)
- Philip Steir – additional programming (track 3)
- Sean Spuehler – programming (track 4)
- Eric White – additional programming (track 4)
- Lady Saw – vocals (track 5)
- Ned Douglas – programming (track 5)
- Gabrial McNair – Clavinet, trombone (track 5); keyboards (track 8)
- Robbie Shakespeare – additional melodic bass (track 5)
- Andy Potts – saxophone (track 5)
- Django Stewart – saxophone (track 5)
- Ric Ocasek – keyboards (tracks 7, 11)
- Prince – keyboards, background vocals (track 12)

=== Technical ===
- Nellee Hooper – production (tracks 2, 6, 9, 10, 13)
- No Doubt – production
- Greg Collins – recording (tracks 2, 6, 9)
- Simon Gogerly – additional engineering (tracks 2, 6, 9)
- Anthony Kilhoffer – engineering assistance (tracks 2, 6, 9)
- Ian Rossiter – engineering assistance (tracks 2, 6, 9, 10)
- Sly & Robbie – production (tracks 3, 5)
- Mark "Spike" Stent – additional production (tracks 3, 5, 7, 11, 12); mixing (Note: Mixed at The Mix Suite, Olympic Studios (London)) (all tracks)
- Dan Chase – recording (tracks 3, 5, 8)
- Philip Steir – additional production (track 3)
- Count – additional engineering (track 3)
- Tkae Mendez – additional engineering (tracks 3, 5, 8)
- Rory Baker – additional engineering (tracks 3, 5)
- Toby Whalen – engineering assistance (tracks 3, 5, 8)
- Tom Dumont – additional recording (tracks 3, 4, 6–9, 11, 13)
- Tony Kanal – additional recording (tracks 3, 4, 6–9, 11, 13)
- Brian Jobson – executive production (tracks 3, 5, 8)
- Wayne Jobson – executive production (tracks 3, 5, 8)
- William Orbit – production (track 4)
- Clif Norrell – recording (track 4)
- Jeff Kanan – engineering assistance (tracks 4, 7, 11)
- Jennifer Young – engineering assistance (track 4)
- Ric Ocasek – production (tracks 7, 11)
- Karl Derfler – recording (tracks 7, 11)
- Juan Pablo Velasco – engineering assistance (tracks 7, 11)
- Steely & Clevie – production (track 8)
- Prince – production (track 12)
- Hans-Martin Buff – recording (track 12)
- Alain Johannes – additional engineering (track 12)
- Steve Mandel – engineering assistance (track 12)
- Wayne Wilkins – mix programming
- Paul "P Dub" Watson – mix programming
- Johnny Gould – additional mix programming
- Matt Fields – mix engineering assistance
- David Treahearn – mix engineering assistance
- Keith Uddin – mix engineering assistance
- Brian "Big Bass" Gardner – mastering (Note: Mastered at Bernie Grundman Mastering (Hollywood, California))

=== Artwork ===
- Gwen Stefani – album art concept
- Jolie Clemens – album design, layout
- Frank Ockenfels – collage photography
- Shawn Mortensen – back cover photography
- Cindy Cooper – album package coordination
- Ekaterina Kenney – album package coordination

== Charts ==
=== Weekly charts ===
Weekly chart performance for Rock Steady
Chart (2001–2003)	Peak position
Australian Albums (ARIA)	15
Austrian Albums (Ö3 Austria)	12
Belgian Alternative Albums (Ultratop Flanders)	30
Canadian Albums (Nielsen SoundScan)	21
Dutch Albums (Album Top 100)	66
European Albums (Music & Media)	40
Finnish Albums (Suomen virallinen lista)	34
French Albums (SNEP)	79
German Albums (Offizielle Top 100)	13
Hungarian Albums (MAHASZ)	30
Irish Albums (IRMA)	53
Japanese Albums (Oricon)	48
New Zealand Albums (RMNZ)	17
Norwegian Albums (VG-lista)	8
Scottish Albums (Official Charts)	39
Swedish Albums (Sverigetopplistan)	52
Swiss Albums (Schweizer Hitparade)	33
UK Albums (Official Charts)	43
US Billboard 200	9

=== Year-end charts ===
2002 year-end chart performance for Rock Steady
Chart (2002)	Position
Australian Albums (ARIA)	97
Canadian Albums (Nielsen SoundScan)	43
Canadian Alternative Albums (Nielsen SoundScan)	11
US Billboard 200	25

2003 year-end chart performance for Rock Steady
Chart (2003)	Position
US Billboard 200	151

=== Decade-end charts ===
Decade-end chart performance for Rock Steady
Chart (2000–2009)	Position
US Billboard 200	166

== Certifications ==
Certifications for Rock Steady
Region	Certification	Certified units/sales
Australia (ARIA)	Gold	35,000^{^}
Canada (Music Canada)	Platinum	100,000^{^}
South Africa (RISA)	Gold	25,000^{*}
United Kingdom (BPI)	Gold	100,000^{^}
United States (RIAA)	2× Platinum	2,842,000
^{*} Sales figures based on certification alone.^{^} Shipments figures based on certification alone.
