= Hella Good =

2002 single by No Doubt

Single by No Doubt

from the album Rock Steady
- Released: March 11, 2002
- Recorded: 2001
- Studio: Record Plant (Los Angeles); Home Recordings (London)
- Genre: Dance-pop; electro-funk; new wave
- Length: 4:02
- Label: Interscope
- Songwriters: Gwen Stefani; Pharrell Williams; Chad Hugo; Tony Kanal
- Producers: Nellee Hooper; No Doubt

No Doubt singles chronology
"Hey Baby" (2001)	"Hella Good" (2002)	"Underneath It All" (2002)

Music video
- "Hella Good" on YouTube

"Hella Good" is a song by American rock band No Doubt from their fifth studio album, Rock Steady (2001). Written by Gwen Stefani, Tony Kanal and the Neptunes (Pharrell Williams and Chad Hugo), and produced by Nellee Hooper and the band, "Hella Good" was released as the album's second single on March 11, 2002, and received positive reviews from contemporary music critics, who made comparisons to the work of a diverse range of artists such as Afrika Bambaataa and Madonna.

Commercially, "Hella Good" was successful, entering the top 20 on the music charts of several countries. For the 45th Grammy Awards, the National Academy of Recording Arts and Sciences introduced new categories for Best Dance Recording and Best Remixed Recording, Non-Classical; the song was nominated for Best Dance Recording, losing to Dirty Vegas' "Days Go By", and Roger Sanchez's remix of "Hella Good" won for Best Remixed Recording, Non-Classical. No Doubt performed a medley of "Underneath It All" and "Hella Good" at the ceremony. The accompanying music video for "Hella Good", directed by Mark Romanek, was filmed in March 2002 and released in April 2002, and it features the band squatting in an abandoned ship.

== Background and writing ==
No Doubt decided to work with hip hop production duo the Neptunes as a sort of "cultural collision". Lead singer Gwen Stefani wanted to write a high-spirited and celebratory song about the positive things in her life, so they wrote an optimistic upbeat song. The word hella was a slang term used mostly in the San Francisco Bay Area and other parts of California to mean "very". Having toured in the Bay Area, Stefani borrowed the term to describe her mood. Stefani wanted to use the word dance in a chorus, so she decided to end each line of "Hella Good"'s chorus with the phrase "keep on dancing". The song's funk sound is based on songs such as Queen's 1980 single "Another One Bites the Dust" and The Commodores' 1977 single "Brick House".

== Composition ==
"Hella Good"
The song's hook is performed on the bass.

"Hella Good" is a dance-pop, electro-funk and new wave song, composed in the key of G minor. It is written in common time and moves at a moderately fast 115 beats per minute. The song is influenced by electro, punk and funk music. The song's beat drew several comparisons to that of Michael Jackson's 1983 single "Billie Jean". Its hook comes from a simple progression of power chords alternating between G and A flat, suggesting Phrygian mode. "Hella Good" follows a verse-chorus form with a chorus following each of the two verses. Following the bridge, the chorus is repeated and the song closes with an outro.

== Critical reception ==
About.com ranked the song number one in a list of the top five singles from Stefani's career, with the band as well as solo, reasoning by saying that the song's "bumping contemporary beat pushes along 80's style keyboards making it nearly impossible to keep from moving your body." Blender described it as a "blazing start" to Rock Steady and compared it to the work of pop group Was (Not Was), rapper and producer Timbaland, ska punk band Fishbone, and electro DJ Afrika Bambaataa. The NME also compared the song to Bambaataa's music as well as that of Britney Spears and Duran Duran. PlayLouder called the track outstanding and compared Nellee Hooper's production to the electroclash style of Chicago house DJ Felix da Housecat.

Entertainment Weekly characterized the song as a sequel to Madonna's 1985 single "Into the Groove". The publication listed "Hella Good" seventh on its list of the top singles of 2002. It went on to include the song in its list of the top five No Doubt songs, in which it described the song as "a dance-pop delight irresistible enough to make you forget that ''hella'' is one of history's most irritating slang terms." Stylus Magazine was pleased with the use of overdubbing in the song's "anthemic rock chorus", but referred to its lyrics as stupid. Billboard referred to the group as the B-52's of the 2000s and praised "Hella Good"'s combination of a strong bassline; "fairly aggressive electric guitar accents"; Kraftwerk-style electronics; and Stefani's "loose, playful" vocals. The song was listed at number 26 on the 2002 Pazz & Jop list, a survey of several hundred music critics conducted by Robert Christgau.

== Chart performance ==
In the United States, "Hella Good" reached number 13 on the Billboard Hot 100. The single was more successful in mainstream markets, reaching number three on the Billboard Mainstream Top 40. It had success on adult contemporary stations, peaking at number nine on the Billboard Adult Top 40. It additionally had some crossover success in urban contemporary markets and reached number 29 on the Billboard Rhythmic Top 40. Interscope Records approached DJ Roger Sanchez to produce a remix of the song, which went on to top the Billboard Dance Club Songs chart. The single was less successful on the Canadian Singles Chart, where it peaked at number 26 for three non-consecutive weeks.

On the UK Singles chart, "Hella Good" debuted at number 12 but was unable to reach a higher position. The single peaked at number eight on the Australian ARIA Singles Chart in June 2002 and remained on the chart for three months. It was listed at number 65 on the Australian year-end chart for 2002, and was certified Gold by the Australian Recording Industry Association. In New Zealand, it peaked at number 17 and spent 15 weeks on the chart.

== Music video ==
Stefani riding a waterjet scene from the music video.

The black-and-white music video was directed by Mark Romanek. Not following any plot, the video depicts the band as a group of punk rockers squatting in an abandoned ship while the rest are chasing Stefani throughout the ship. During the course of the video, the band members perform the song, using bodyboards to float electronic equipment, and they and their friends explore and dance throughout the ship. There are also sequences of people riding on personal water crafts, Stefani performing on a coiled rope, people playing Jet Set Radio Future, and Stefani broadcasting on a pirate radio station.

Romanek came up with the video's concept it and e-mailed it to the band. He based it on a black-and-white Italian Vogue fashion shoot from the mid-1990s which featured models on waverunners. The video was then filmed over three days in March 2002 in Long Beach, California. The scenes inside the ship were filmed from man-made sets at South Bay Studios.

The music video was moderately successful. Following a premiere on an episode of MTV's Making the Video, it reached number four on the network's video countdown Total Request Live. The video debuted on MuchMusic's Countdown in April 2002 and peaked at number six, spending over four months on the program. At the 2003 Music Video Production Association Awards, production designer Laura Fox won the Universal Studios Production Services Award for Best Art Direction for her work on this video.

== In popular culture ==
The song was featured in the opening sequence of the 2005 film The Longest Yard, and was also used for the second season Alias episode "The Getaway" in 2003 and in the pilot episode of The Black Donnellys in 2007.

In 2013 Rita Ora covered the song at Radio 1's Big Weekend. In 2026 Trixie Mattel and Bonnie McKee released a remix cover of the song.

== Track listings ==
Australasian and Japanese CD single

1. "Hella Good" (album version) – 4:02
2. "Hey Baby" ("Stank Remix" dirty version featuring Outkast and Killer Mike) – 4:06
3. "Hey Baby" (Kelly G's Bumpin' Baby club mix) – 8:14
4. "Hella Good" (video) – 4:02

UK CD single

1. "Hella Good" (album version) – 4:02
2. "Hella Good" (Roger's Release Yourself mix) – 7:13
3. "Hey Baby" ("Stank Remix" dirty version featuring Outkast and Killer Mike) – 4:06
4. "Hella Good" (video) – 4:02

UK 12-inch single

A1. "Hella Good" (Roger's Release Yourself mix) – 7:13
B1. "Hella Good" (Roger's Release the Dub mix) – 7:14
B2. "Hey Baby" ("Stank Remix" dirty version featuring Outkast and Killer Mike) – 4:02

UK cassette single

1. "Hella Good" (album version) – 4:02
2. "Hella Good" (Roger's Release Yourself mix) – 7:13

European CD single

1. "Hella Good" (album version) – 4:02
2. "Hey Baby" ("Stank Remix" dirty version featuring Outkast and Killer Mike) – 4:06

== Charts ==
=== Weekly charts ===
Weekly chart performance for "Hella Good"
Chart (2002)	Peak position
Australia (ARIA)	8
Austria (Ö3 Austria Top 40)	44
Belgium (Ultratip Bubbling Under Flanders)	3
Belgium (Ultratip Bubbling Under Wallonia)	14
Canada (Nielsen SoundScan)	26
Canada CHR (Nielsen BDS)	3
Croatia (HRT)	2
Europe (Eurochart Hot 100)	40
Germany (GfK)	46
Greece (IFPI)	16
Ireland (IRMA)	29
Italy (FIMI)	23
Netherlands (Dutch Top 40 Tipparade)	6
Netherlands (Single Top 100)	57
New Zealand (Recorded Music NZ)	17
Romania (Romanian Top 100)	62
Scottish Singles Sales (Official Charts)	14
Switzerland (Schweizer Hitparade)	78
UK Singles (Official Charts)	12
UK Hip Hop/R&B (Official Charts)	2
US Billboard Hot 100	13
US Adult Pop Airplay (Billboard)	9
US Dance Club Songs (Billboard) Roger Sanchez remixes	1
US Pop Airplay (Billboard)	3
US Rhythmic Airplay (Billboard)	29

=== Year-end charts ===
Year-end chart performance for "Hella Good"
Chart (2002)	Position
Australia (ARIA)	65
Canada (Nielsen SoundScan)	156
Canada Radio (Nielsen BDS)	28
US Billboard Hot 100	59
US Adult Top 40 (Billboard)	20
US Dance Club Play (Billboard)	18
US Mainstream Top 40 (Billboard)	28

== Certifications ==
Certifications and sales for "Hella Good"
Region	Certification	Certified units/sales
Australia (ARIA)	Gold	35,000^{^}
New Zealand (RMNZ)	Gold	15,000^{‡}
United Kingdom (BPI)	Silver	200,000^{‡}
United States (RIAA)	Platinum	1,000,000^{‡}
^{^} Shipments figures based on certification alone.^{‡} Sales+streaming figures based on certification alone.

== Release history ==
Release dates and formats for "Hella Good"
Region	Date	Format(s)	Label(s)	Ref.
United States	March 11, 2002	Alternative radio	Interscope	
United States	April 1, 2002	Contemporary hit radio	Interscope	
Australia	April 29, 2002	CD	Interscope	
United Kingdom	June 3, 2002	12-inch vinyl; CD; cassette	Interscope	
Japan	July 31, 2002	CD	Interscope	
