= Richie Stephens =

Jamaican singer and producer (born 1966)

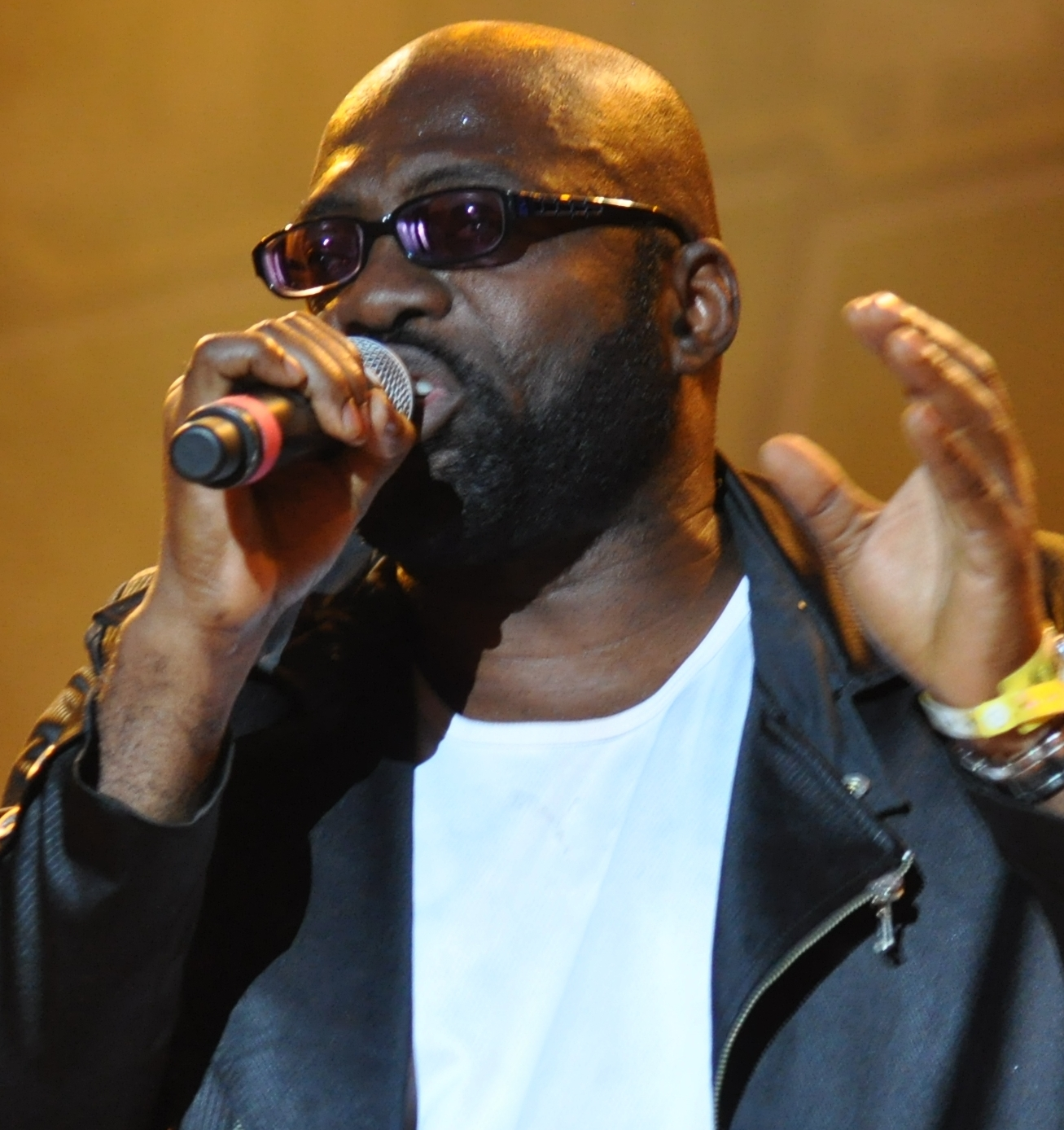
- Stephens performing in 2013

Background information
- Born: Richard Stephenson; 5 December 1966 (age 59)
- Origin: Savanna-la-Mar, Jamaica
- Genres: R&B, reggae, reggae fusion, dancehall
- Occupations: Singer-songwriter, producer
- Labels: Motown/PolyGram; VP; Pot of Gold; Greensleeves
- Website: richiestephensmusic.com

Richard Stephenson (born 5 December 1966), better known as Richie Stephens is a Jamaican R&B, dancehall and reggae singer and producer.

== Biography ==
Born in Savanna-la-Mar, Westmoreland, Jamaica, Stephens worked in the early 1990s as part of the twice Grammy Award winning act Soul II Soul. He recorded at Motown, and recorded for the VP label before establishing his own label, Pot of Gold Records. Later that decade he released dancehall singles such as "Winner", "Bus the Place" and "Slop Dem". His tracks "Legacy" (Mad Cobra featuring Richie Stephens, 1993) and "Come Give Me Your Love" (Richie Stephens featuring General Degree, 1997) peaked at numbers 64 and 61 respectively in the UK Singles Chart.

In 1998, Stephens' album Winner was released by Greensleeves, produced by himself, Frenchie, Danny Brownie and Donovan Germain. Since then, Stephens has focused his music on Christian related themes.

In 2006, Stephens received the Jamaican Governor-General's Achievement Award for contributing to civic, social and recreational projects in and around the parish of Westmoreland.

In January 2011, Stephen's adopted son Demar Graham, who went by the stage name Copper Cat, was shot and killed outside his home in Kingston.

Stephens released a new album God is on My Side on 22 May 2012, under Pot of Gold/VPAL. He also released a collaboration album with German reggae singer Gentleman on 27 November 2012. In 2014, following the growth of EDM in Jamaica, Stephens sought to capitalize on this by launching a new riddim called 'Skatech' which was an amalgamation of Jamaican ska and EDM. Stephens believed that due to ska not being at the forefront of Jamaican music for many years, combining it with something fresh could bring it back into the spotlight.

On 16 March 2013, he sang the Jamaican national anthem at the FIFA World Cup Qualifier between Jamaica and Panama at the National Stadium, Kingston.

In 2015, he began working with Italian ska ensemble the Ska Nation Band, while continuing to work as a solo artist. In November 2015, he was reportedly working on a new solo album set for release in early 2016.

== Album discography ==
- On Broadway (1990), Jamaazima
- Richie Stephens (1991), Gong Sounds
- Sincerely (1991), VP
- Pot of Gold (1993), Motown
- Forever (1994), Pot of Gold
- Miracles (1995), VP
- Special Work of Art (1996), Penthouse
- Buff Baff (1997), Multimedia
- Winner (1998), Greensleeves
- Perfect Love (2000), VP
- The Man Upstairs (2002), Ejaness
- Covers for Lovers (2003), Pot of Gold
- Come to Jamaica (2008), Pot of Gold
- Reggae Evolution (2010), Pot of Gold
- Live Your Life (2012), Pot of Gold – with Gentleman
- God Is on My Side (2012), Pot of Gold
- Real Reggae Music (2013), Kingstone
- Internationally (2016), Richie Stephens and the Ska Nation Band, Pot of Gold, Adriatic Sound

== Accusation of rape ==
In 2021, Richie Stephens was accused of rape by numerous women. The first who spoke up was Elaine Lim, a 27 year-old from Singapore. She said she stayed in one flat with Stephens while he was touring in Australia in 2019 and was raped by him. Stephens denied all the allegations. In October 2021, another seven women came forward with the same stories as Lim told the press.

The Jamaican newspaper The Gleaner reported that the Australian police's investigation into Stephens following Lim's accusations had been closed.
