= Merciless (DJ) =

Jamaican dancehall and reggae artist (1971–2022)

Merciless, born Leonard Bartley (1 July 1971 – 19 July 2022) in the Turner district of Chapelton, Clarendon, Jamaica, was a Jamaican dancehall and reggae artist. He died on 19 July 2022, in St. Andrew, Jamaica.

== Biography ==
Merciless first found success performing with sound systems. He made his recording début in 1994 with "Len Out Mi Mercy", which was a hit in Jamaica and elsewhere, and a string of further hits followed, including "Mavis", which was the top reggae single in Jamaica in 1995 and used the same riddim as Shaggy's "Mr. Boombastic". Like several other dancehall stars, he adopted 'conscious' lyrical content in the late 1990s. He is similar in sound to fellow artist Bounty Killer. In the late 2000s he was imprisoned in Florida for fourteen months.

He was also known by the nickname "Warhead", and engaged in several high-profile on-stage 'battles' in the late 1990s and 2000s with fellow deejays Beenie Man, Ninjaman, and Bounty Killer. His rivalry with Bounty Killer did not prevent the two from recording together, with "No One Cares" released in 2000.

== Discography ==
- Mr. Merciless (1994), VP Records
- Len' Out Mi Mercy (1995), Annex
- Mama's Cooking (1997), Greensleeves Records
