= Hey Baby (No Doubt song) =

2001 single by No Doubt

Single by No Doubt featuring Bounty Killer

from the album Rock Steady
- Released: October 29, 2001
- Recorded: 2001
- Studio: Toast (San Francisco, California); The Sidsehack (Los Angeles, California); Geejam (Port Antonio, Jamaica); One Pop (Kingston, Jamaica)
- Genre: Dancehall-pop
- Length: 3:26
- Label: Interscope
- Songwriters: Gwen Stefani; Tony Kanal; Tom Dumont; Rodney Price
- Producers: Sly and Robbie; No Doubt

No Doubt singles chronology
"Bathwater" (2000)	"Hey Baby" (2001)	"Hella Good" (2002)

Music video
- "Hey Baby" on YouTube

"Hey Baby" is a song by American rock band No Doubt from their fifth studio album Rock Steady (2001). Written by band members Gwen Stefani, Tony Kanal and Tom Dumont, "Hey Baby" was released as the album's lead single on October 29, 2001, by Interscope Records. "Hey Baby" is heavily influenced by the Jamaican dancehall music present at No Doubt's post-show parties and tour bus lounges of their Return of Saturn tour. Its lyrics describe the debauchery with groupies at these parties.

"Hey Baby" received generally positive reviews from music critics, although its dancehall influences had a mixed reception. An accompanying music video features scenes that mimic the parties No Doubt attended while recording the parent album in Jamaica. "Hey Baby" was commercially successful, peaking at number five on the US Billboard Hot 100. It also reached the top-ten in several other countries, including Australia, Germany, New Zealand and the United Kingdom. At the 45th Grammy Awards, No Doubt won the Grammy Award for Best Pop Performance by a Duo or Group with Vocal.

== Background and writing ==
"Hey Baby" was one of the first songs written for Rock Steady. The song begins with instrumentals programmed with producer Philip Steir at Toast Studios in San Francisco. They experimented with ray gun-like electronic effects and sounds that guitarist Tom Dumont compared to Star Wars music. Notably, the intro is reminiscent of the beginning of the song "Jungle Love" by the Steve Miller Band. The lyrics and melodies were recorded at a session at Dumont's home studio in Los Angeles weeks later. While the band was working on the album in Kingston, Jamaica, during March 2001, producers Sly and Robbie left the percussion and Gwen Stefani's original vocal. The band asked about adding a guest appearance on the song, so Sly and Robbie recommended and added a toast from Bounty Killer.

Like the song's dancehall style, the lyrics depict the band's post-show parties from touring in support of their fourth studio album Return of Saturn (2000). The song details female groupies who attended the parties to hook up with the male band members. Stefani commented that "if you're talented and you're up there, girls want to make out with you." Bassist Tony Kanal described it as "a very PG version" of the licentiousness that took place while touring. The song also touches on Rock Steady's overall theme of Stefani's impatience in her long-distance relationship with then-boyfriend/British rock musician Gavin Rossdale (whom she eventually married in 2002), as she sits "sipping on chamomile/watching boys and girls and their sex appeal".

== Composition ==
"Hey Baby"
The song's lyrics describes groupies at No Doubt's post-show parties.

"Hey Baby" is a dancehall song composed in the key of E minor. It is written in common time and moves at a moderate tempo of 90 beats per minute. The song focuses on programming and lacks prominent live instrumentation. As a result, the band needed four keyboard rigs to recreate the track's sound for live performances, including a Roland AX-1 and an E-mu Proteus 2000. Stefani's vocal range spans over two octaves in the song, from D_{3} to E_{5}.

The song opens with an introduction consisting of a sustained measure of electronic effects followed by two lines from the chorus. In each two-measure line during the first half of the verses, Stefani descends the scale while the keyboard plays the off-beats of the first measure and the electric bass opens the line with a two-note bassline. During the second half of the verses, Stefani's vocals are overdubbed, and the instrumentation becomes more frequent. Each of the two verses is followed by the chorus, where overdubbing is used on Stefani's vocals to produce first inversion and normal form E minor chords. Bounty Killer then toasts the bridge, and after a brief section sung by Stefani, the song closes by repeating the chorus twice.

== Critical reception ==
"Hey Baby" received generally positive reviews from music critics. LAUNCHcast's Lisa Oliver described the song as a mix of "spacesynth" and ragga that "bursts with Batman punches." Colleen Delaney of Stylus Magazine was unimpressed by the lyrics' double entendres and noted that the toast and "deep, booming production save this song from being thin" but that it remained "inane and unengaging". Sal Cinquemani of Slant Magazine found the song a return to the band's roots, and that it finds No Doubt "sunnier (and tighter) than ever" as a result. Entertainment Weekly included "Hey Baby" in a list of the band's top five songs. About.com ranked the song number three in a list of the top five singles from Stefani's career, with the band and as a solo artist, for her "simultaneously sounding like she understands the hippest of contemporary pop (the Bounty Killer guest rap doesn't hurt) while having the wisdom of an adult several years out of high school." The song was listed at number thirty-eight on the 2002 Pazz & Jop list, a survey of several hundred music critics conducted by Robert Christgau.

The band's endeavor in dancehall music received mixed reviews. AllMusic reviewer Stephen Thomas Erlewine viewed the toast as a mistake, and Blender's Rupert Howe found the foray into dancehall misguided, leaving Bounty Killer sounding bored. Alex Needham wrote for NME that the song was a strong example of "white reggae" but that many listeners may not be able to tolerate the genre itself. For Entertainment Weekly, David Browne described the chorus as "big, bustling, and irresistible" and its hip hop influence as kicky. In the BBC review of The Singles 1992-2003, Ruth Mitchell wrote that the chorus was addictive and chiming and that the song had a "catchy dancehall groove".

== Chart performance ==
"Hey Baby" was chosen as the lead single from Rock Steady to represent the band's more "upbeat and confident" attitude for the album. It was commercially successful in the United States and enticed a younger audience to No Doubt. The song debuted at number 36 on the Billboard Hot 100, remaining on the chart for half a year. In its third week, the song became the band's highest-charting single, eventually peaking at number five for two consecutive weeks, later broken when "Underneath It All" reached number three. It was successful in the mainstream music market, topping the Top 40 Mainstream and reaching the top ten on the Top 40 Tracks and Adult Top 40. The song had significant crossover success and reached number five on the Rhythmic Top 40 chart. At the 2003 Grammy Awards, the song won the award for Best Pop Performance by a Duo or Group with Vocal, and No Doubt performed a "double medley" of "Underneath It All" and "Hella Good" at the show.

The song had similar success in Europe, reaching number five on the Eurochart Hot 100 Singles. In the United Kingdom, "Hey Baby" debuted at number two on the UK Singles Chart. It reached the top 10 in Denmark, Finland, Germany, Greece, and Norway, and the top 20 in Austria, Belgium, Ireland, Italy, the Netherlands, Sweden, and Switzerland.

In Australia, "Hey Baby" debuted on the ARIA Singles Chart at number 28 and peaked four weeks later at number seven. It was listed at number 37 on the 2002 end-of-year chart. On the New Zealand Singles Chart, it reached number two, under Shakira's "Whenever, Wherever", for two non-consecutive weeks.

== Music video ==
Adrian Young's controversial full frontal on the gymnastics rings, based on an actual event

The accompanying music video, directed by Dave Meyers, follows the theme of the lyrics. It shows the band on a tour bus, stopping at a party at Club Poonani. The members separate when three girls approach the male band members. Kanal has his picture taken with several women, paying for it by taking money that drummer Adrian Young earns by hanging from gymnastics rings naked, but censored. Dumont defeats a woman, portrayed by Sonya Eddy, in an endurance drinking game, and Stefani dances, eventually joining Bounty Killer on stage. There are intercut scenes of the band members on a red and black background, a black and white houndstooth background, and standing on top of the phrases "NO DOUBT", "ROCK STEADY", and "HEY BABY" in red and white.

The video was filmed in three days in Boyle Heights, Los Angeles. The scenes were designed to recreate the parties that the band attended while recording Rock Steady in Jamaica. Young's scene was based on an actual event, where he won US$200 on a dare to hang upside down and naked on the rings at a club in New York City. Dumont's scene, filmed at Casa Mexicana, is inspired by a similar scene from the 1981 Indiana Jones film Raiders of the Lost Ark.

Young's full frontal on the rings, shown during Bounty Killer's line "The way you rock your hips, you know that it amaze me," was controversial. Bounty Killer's rival Beenie Man stated that "the video portray Bounty as a gay. That is a Jamaican artist, and that can't gwan in a dancehall, no way." Bounty Killer cancelled his performances with No Doubt because of the incident, stating that "they did not understand because they are from America and they accept gay people … If Jamaica is upset, I ain't going to accept no success that my culture is not proud of."

The video premiered on MTV on November 6, 2001, and debuted at number 10 on TRL, peaking at number three, and topped VH1's Top 20 Countdown for three weeks. The video won the MTV Video Music Awards for Best Pop Video and Best Group Video in 2002. The video was nominated for Best International Group Video at the 2002 MuchMusic Video Awards but lost to Korn's "Here to Stay".

== Live performances ==
No Doubt performed the song live during a number of public appearances, beginning with an appearance at the 2002 Billboard Music Awards held on December 4, 2001. Their headline Rock Steady Tour in 2002 also used "Hey Baby" in its set list. The accompanying video release, Rock Steady Live, includes the live segment where the single was performed as well.

== Track listings ==
Australian and European CD maxi-single

1. "Hey Baby" featuring Bounty Killer
2. "Hey Baby" – "The Homeboy Mix" aka "Fabian mix"
3. "Ex-Girlfriend" – "The Psycho Ex mix" aka "Philip Steir mix"
4. "Hey Baby" music video

UK CD maxi-single

1. "Hey Baby" featuring Bounty Killer
2. "Hey Baby" (Fabian remix)

"Hey Baby" / "Hella Good" US vinyl release

- A1. "Hey Baby"
- A2. "Hey Baby" instrumental
- A3. "Hey Baby" (The Homeboy mix)
- B1. "Hey Baby" (The Homeboy mix) instrumental
- B2. "Hella Good"

== Personnel ==
Personnel are adapted from the Rock Steady booklet.

- Vocals, songwriting: Gwen Stefani
- Vocals, songwriting: Bounty Killer
- Bass guitar, songwriter: Tony Kanal
- Guitar, songwriter: Tom Dumont
- Drums: Adrian Young
- Keyboards: Kanal, Dumont
- Production: Sly & Robbie, No Doubt, Mark "Spike" Stent, Philip Steir
- Recording engineering: Dan Chase, Kanal, Dumont
- Audio engineering: Count, Tkae Mendez, Rory Baker
- Assistant audio engineering: Toby Whalen

== Charts ==
=== Weekly charts ===
Weekly chart performance for "Hey Baby"
Chart (2001–2002)	Peak position
Australia (ARIA)	7
Austria (Ö3 Austria Top 40)	12
Belgium (Ultratop 50 Flanders)	19
Belgium (Ultratop 50 Wallonia)	31
Canada (BDS)	41
Croatia (HRT)	5
Denmark (Tracklisten)	7
Europe (Eurochart Hot 100)	5
Finland (Suomen virallinen lista)	9
France (SNEP)	47
Germany (GfK)	8
Greece (IFPI)	10
Ireland (IRMA)	15
Italy (FIMI)	11
Netherlands (Dutch Top 40)	13
Netherlands (Single Top 100)	14
New Zealand (Recorded Music NZ)	2
Norway (VG-lista)	3
Romania (Romanian Top 100)	2
Scotland Singles (OCC)	5
Sweden (Sverigetopplistan)	17
Switzerland (Schweizer Hitparade)	11
UK Singles (OCC)	2
US Billboard Hot 100	5
US Adult Pop Airplay (Billboard)	10
US Pop Airplay (Billboard)	1
US Rhythmic Airplay (Billboard)	5

=== Year-end charts ===
Year-end chart performance for "Hey Baby"
Chart (2002)	Position
Australia (ARIA)	37
Brazil (Crowley)	80
Canada Radio (Nielsen BDS)	38
Europe (Eurochart Hot 100)	95
Netherlands (Dutch Top 40)	89
New Zealand (Recorded Music NZ)	35
UK Singles (OCC)	109
UK Airplay (Music Week)	20
US Billboard Hot 100	32
US Adult Top 40 (Billboard)	34
US Mainstream Top 40 (Billboard)	13
US Rhythmic Top 40 (Billboard)	53

== Certifications ==
Certifications for "Hey Baby"
Region	Certification	Certified units/sales
Australia (ARIA)	Gold	35,000^{^}
Norway (IFPI Norway)	Gold	
United States (RIAA)	Gold	500,000^{‡}
^{^} Shipments figures based on certification alone.^{‡} Sales+streaming figures based on certification alone.

== Release history ==
Release dates and formats for "Hey Baby"
Region	Date	Format(s)	Label(s)	Ref.
United States	October 29, 2001	—N/a	Interscope	
Australia	December 10, 2001	CD	Interscope	
New Zealand	January 28, 2002	CD	Interscope	
United Kingdom	February 4, 2002	CD; cassette	Interscope	
