= Underneath It All =

2002 single by No Doubt

Single by No Doubt featuring Lady Saw

from the album Rock Steady
- Released: July 22, 2002
- Studio: 7 Dials (London, England); Geejam (Port Antonio, Jamaica); One Pop (Kingston, Jamaica)
- Genre: Reggae; dancehall
- Length: 5:02 (album version); 4:10 (radio edit)
- Label: Interscope
- Songwriters: Gwen Stefani; David Stewart
- Producers: Sly and Robbie; No Doubt

No Doubt singles chronology
"Hella Good" (2002)	"Underneath It All" (2002)	"Running" (2003)

Music video
- "Underneath It All" on YouTube

"Underneath It All" is a song by American rock band No Doubt, released in July 2002 as the third single from their fourth studio album, Rock Steady (2001). Written by the band's lead singer Gwen Stefani and David Stewart, the song features a reggae production from Sly and Robbie and guest vocals from Lady Saw. The song received mixed reviews from contemporary music critics and became No Doubt's highest-charting US single, as well as entering the top 10 in Canada and New Zealand. It won a Grammy Award for Best Pop Performance by a Duo or Group with Vocal at the 46th Grammy Awards.

== Background and writing ==
During a visit to her then-boyfriend Gavin Rossdale in London, Gwen Stefani and David Stewart used backward string samples to write the song in only ten minutes. Guitarist Tom Dumont commented that Stewart's experience helped them keep the song simple because he "would have way overthought those chord changes." When the band was working on the album Rock Steady in Jamaica, producers Sly and Robbie called Lady Saw to have her contribute a guest toast. After listening to the song, Lady Saw wrote and recorded her part on the spot.

== Music and structure ==
A love song composed in the key of E major, the track is written in common time and moves slowly at 69 beats per minute. Stefani avoids the heavy vocal vibrato that she often uses. Her vocal range spans under an octave and a half during the song, from F#_{3} to B_{4}. The song describes Stefani's relationship with Rossdale, and the line "You're really lovely underneath it all" comes from a journal entry that Stefani made after spending a day in the park with him.

The song opens with a sample from Bob Clarke's Sunday radio show on IRIE FM, and a recording of Rossdale stating "You don't have to forget, just remember this Sunday, alright?" The verses use a simple I-vi chord progression, alternating between a first inversion E major chord and a second inversion C♯ minor chord, played on the off-beats and switch to a IV-iii progression. Each verse is followed by the chorus, which uses a I-IV-V-IV progression. After the bridge, Lady Saw performs her toast. Stefani then sings the chorus twice, and Clarke closes the song after Stefani repeats the line "Mm mm mm underneath it all" four times. An alternative version of "Underneath It All" with a more pop-centric structure was released to pop radio stations, omitting Lady Saw's verse.

== Critical reception ==
"Underneath It All" received mixed reviews from contemporary music critics. Rolling Stone found its ska sound and Stefani's questioning whether or not Rossdale is her soulmate tired. LAUNCHcast agreed the beat was one "that Sly & Robbie can do in their sleep" but added that the song "keeps its modern edge thanks to Lady Saw's cooling rap." Kitty Empire writing in NME also gave Lady Saw's toast a positive review, stating that it "does an excellent job of sexing up all the sugar." Stylus Magazine was pleased with Stefani's performance on the song, stating that "she lets her voice ride gently on top of the melody, pushed along by the gentle steel drums in the background." PopMatters commented that "No Doubt isn't afraid of working with new ideas" but that the dancehall of "Underneath It All" was unsuccessful and sloppy. In its review of The Singles 1992-2003, OMH Media described the song as "an embarrassingly self-conscious reggae pastiche, unimproved by a guest rap from Jamaican dancehall queen Lady Saw."

== Chart performance ==
"Underneath It All" peaked at number three on the Billboard Hot 100 for two weeks, becoming No Doubt's highest-charting US single on this chart. On the Billboard component charts, it topped the Mainstream Top 40 ranking and reaching number two on the Top 40 Tracks chart. The single was also successful in the adult contemporary radio market, reaching number two on the Adult Top 40 chart and number 27 on the Adult Contemporary chart. It had some crossover success on urban contemporary stations, entering the top 40 on the Rhythmic Top 40 chart.

Internationally, the song was a top-three hit on Canadian contemporary hit radio (CHR), peaking at number three on Nielsen BDS's CHR chart. "Underneath It All" debuted at number 18 on the UK Singles chart but was unable to reach a higher position. In mainland Europe, it reached the top 40 only in Austria and Sweden. On the Australian ARIA Singles Chart, the single peaked at number 28 and remained on the chart for seven weeks. In New Zealand, the single peaked at number eight on the RIANZ Singles Chart for two consecutive weeks and stayed on the chart for over four months.

== Music video ==
The accompanying music video for the song, directed by Sophie Muller and directing collaborative Logan, opens with a sequence of Stefani, as shown on the cover of the single, removing several pieces of clothing and later lying on a bed. After a scene with her in front of a white heart with roses, bassist Tony Kanal and drummer Adrian Young play basketball while Stefani stands against the wall. Stefani is then shown against a sparkling sky, followed by a scene of the whole band bicycling during Lady Saw's toast. The video closes with a scene of Stefani jumping on a bed in white undergarments and without makeup.

Muller wanted to add more sexual themes to the look of the video to contrast with the innocence of the song's lyrics. The original idea for the video was to show Stefani with heavy makeup "really over done like a stripper" and have her remove her clothing throughout the video. Muller found that this complicated the video too much, so each sequence shows Stefani with progressively less makeup instead. Muller decided to use a color scheme with bright colors such as orange, lime green and pink, and the contrast was increased using Symphony in post-production. The bicycling scene was to originally show footage that the band shot while recording in Jamaica since Stefani wanted to include a Jamaican theme. Instead, the scene was created by filming the individual band members on a twelve-foot turntable in front of a bluescreen. Tracks were used to shoot two members riding next to each other and Logan used computer-generated imagery to show the entire band bicycling in Jamaica.

The video was successful on video channels. It debuted on MTV's Total Request Live October 7, 2002, at number seven. It reached number five on the countdown and was on the program for twenty-four days. "Underneath It All" peaked at number two on MuchMusic's Countdown in September 2002. The video received nominations for Best Pop Video and Best Cinematography at the 2003 MTV Video Music Awards, but lost to Justin Timberlake's "Cry Me a River" and Johnny Cash's cover of "Hurt" respectively.

== Track listing and formats ==
CD maxi-single

1. "Underneath It All" featuring Lady Saw (album version) – 5:03
2. "Underneath It All" (Radio 1Live acoustic version) – 3:44
3. "Just a Girl" (Radio 1Live acoustic version) – 3:30
4. "Underneath It All" (video) – 5:03

2-track CD single

1. "Underneath It All" featuring Lady Saw (album version) – 5:03
2. "Underneath It All" (Radio 1Live acoustic version) – 3:44

== Personnel ==
- Gwen Stefani – vocals
- Tom Dumont – guitar, keyboards
- Tony Kanal – bass, keyboards, saxophone
- Adrian Young – drums, percussion
- Gabrial McNair – trombone
- Lady Saw – vocals
- Ned Douglas – programming
- Robbie Shakespeare – additional melodic bass
- Andy Potts – saxophone
- Django Stewart – saxophone

== Charts ==
=== Weekly charts ===
Weekly chart performance for "Underneath It All"
Chart (2002–2004)	Peak position
Australia (ARIA)	28
Austria (Ö3 Austria Top 40)	34
Belgium (Ultratip Bubbling Under Flanders)	13
Canada CHR (Nielsen BDS)	3
Europe (Eurochart Hot 100)	46
France (SNEP)	71
Germany (GfK)	42
Ireland (IRMA)	39
Netherlands (Dutch Top 40)	31
Netherlands (Single Top 100)	49
New Zealand (Recorded Music NZ)	8
Romania (Romanian Top 100)	27
Scottish Singles Sales (Official Charts)	20
Sweden (Sverigetopplistan)	39
Switzerland (Schweizer Hitparade)	54
UK Singles (Official Charts)	18
US Billboard Hot 100	3
US Adult Contemporary (Billboard)	27
US Adult Pop Airplay (Billboard)	2
US Pop Airplay (Billboard)	1
US Rhythmic Airplay (Billboard)	38
US Top 40 Tracks (Billboard)	2

=== Year-end charts ===
2002 year-end chart performance for "Underneath It All"
Chart (2002)	Position
US Billboard Hot 100	71

2003 year-end chart performance for "Underneath It All"
Chart (2003)	Position
US Billboard Hot 100	59
US Adult Top 40 (Billboard)	15

== Certifications ==
Certifications for "Underneath It All"
Region	Certification	Certified units/sales
New Zealand (RMNZ)	Platinum	30,000^{‡}
United States (RIAA)	Platinum	1,000,000^{‡}
^{‡} Sales+streaming figures based on certification alone.

== Release history ==
Release dates and formats for "Underneath It All"
Region	Date	Format(s)	Label(s)	Ref.
United States	July 22, 2002	Contemporary hit radio	Interscope	
Australia	September 2, 2002	CD	Interscope	
United States	September 23, 2002	Hot adult contemporary radio	Interscope	
United Kingdom	September 30, 2002	CD; cassette	Interscope	
