= Bounty Killer =

Jamaican musician (born 1972)

Bounty Killer OD
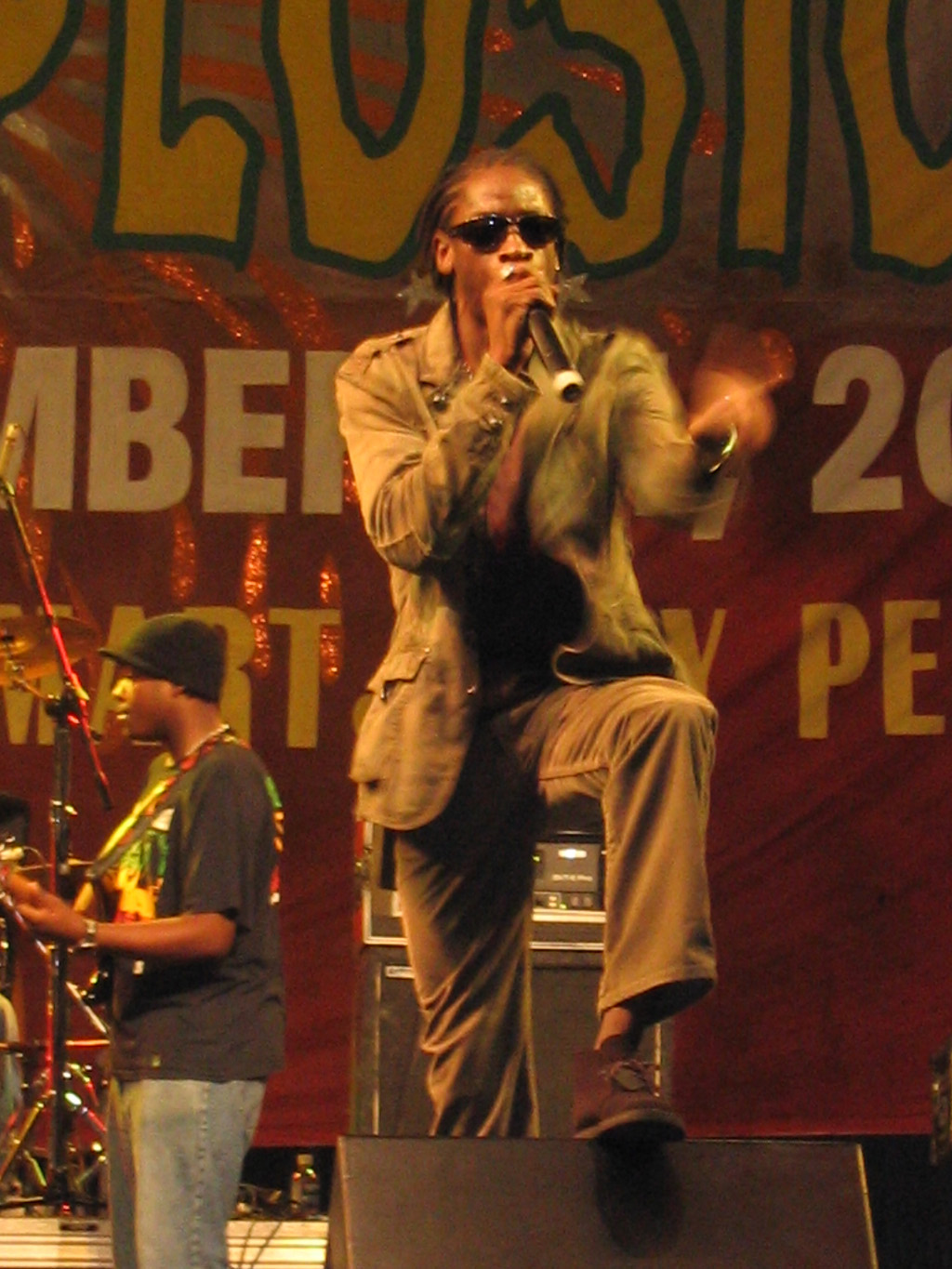
- Bounty Killer performing in 2006

Background information
- Also known as: Warlord; Five Star General; Ghetto Gladiator; Poor People's Governor
- Born: Rodney Basil Price; 12 June 1972 (age 54)
- Origin: Kingston
- Genres: Reggae; dancehall
- Occupation: Musician
- Years active: 1992–present
- Labels: VP; TVT

Rodney Basil Price (born 12 June 1972), known as Bounty Killer, is a Jamaican reggae and dancehall deejay. AllMusic describes him as "one of the most aggressive dancehall stars of the '90s, a street-tough rude boy with an unrepentant flair for gun talk". He is widely regarded as one of the greatest and most influential dancehall lyricists of all time.

== Biography ==
=== Early life and career ===
Price moved to Kingston at an early age, along with his mother and siblings. Price started his musical career as a sound system deejay in his early teens. At the age of 14, Price was shot by a stray bullet during a gunfight between rival political factions, and while convalescing in hospital decided on the name Bounty Killer. After recovering, he increased his performances on a greater number of sound systems, and turned his attention towards recording.

=== 1990s ===
Before his entry into the dancehall industry, Bounty Killer was in the retail industry as an entrepreneur selling figurines. He was then encouraged to record at King Jammy's Recording Studio in Kingston. Price eventually recorded with King Jammy, the first session being in Spring 1992. One of his first tunes was the "Coppershot", which Jammy was unwilling to release due to its lyrics glorifying gun culture. Jammy's brother Uncle T disagreed and released the single himself, which went on to become an underground hit in both Jamaica and New York.

In 1993, Price performed at the popular reggae festival Sting (held in Portmore, Jamaica every year on Boxing Day), whereupon he had a high-profile clash with fellow deejay Beenie Man. The rivalry continued through the 1990s, with both accusing the other of a stolen act. They settled their differences after both realized the negative effect their feud was having on the industry. He has also had heated rivalries with several other top deejays, including Merciless, Super Cat and Vybz Kartel, throughout his career.

He increased control over his output in 1995 by leaving Jammy and setting up his own Scare Dem Productions company and Priceless Records label.

During the 1990s, Price voiced for several producers and labels in Jamaica, releasing songs such as "Defend the Poor", "Mama", "Book, Book, Book", "Babylon System" "Down in the Ghetto" and "Look Good". At about this time, he became known in USA and in Europe, recording with such artists as Busta Rhymes, No Doubt, Masta Killa, The Fugees, Wyclef Jean, Mobb Deep, Capone-N-Noreaga, Swizz Beatz and AZ.

In the mid-1990s, he began releasing albums, with four released in 1994. His 1996 album My Xperience was hugely successful, spending six months on the Billboard reggae chart.

In 1997, Bounty Killer made a cover version of Rose Royce hit single "Love Don't Live Here Anymore" with Swedish singer Robyn. The song was a success in the Caribbean. It was featured in She's So Lovely (Sean Penn film).

In 1998, he contributed the song "Deadly Zone" to the album Blade: Music from and Inspired by the Motion Picture.

Price has expressed disdain for popular rap, which he called "embarrassing to reggae," even when collaborating with Wu-Tang Clan, Mobb Deep and others he considers hardcore.

=== 2000s ===
Further success followed with albums such as Ghetto Dictionary Volume I: Art of War and Ghetto Dictionary Volume II: Mystery, the latter receiving a Grammy nomination, which he lost to veteran Reggae producer Lee Scratch Perry, Bounty Killer later admitting that he felt he should have won the award, as Lee Scratch should have won that category during his glory days. In 2006, he signed with VP Records and released the compilation album Nah No Mercy – The Warlord Scrolls on 7 November 2006. He has been credited with having inspired many young artists such as Vybz Kartel, Mavado and Elephant Man and several other members of The Alliance.

In 2002, a collaboration with No Doubt, the song "Hey Baby", won Bounty Killer his first Grammy Award, for Best Pop Vocal Performance by a duo or group. The win made Bounty Killer one of the few hardcore Dancehall artists to win a Grammy Award. Hey Baby also sold over a million copies making it Bounty Killer's first single to go platinum. The deejay was also voted 'Guinness greatest Dancehall icon' in 2012 and later won deejay of the year in 2013, in The STAR People's Choice Award presented by The Jamaica Gleaner.

In 2003, Price canceled two of his concerts after the LGBT magazine Outrage! petitioned Scotland Yard for his arrest, claiming songs about bashing gays would incite harassment against the gay community. He returned in 2006 after a three-year hiatus, performing uncensored lyrics at several venues without recrimination. He has since directed his focus to social commentary and party lyrics, admitting that he will not pay attention to nor attack the gay community in his music.

In 2014, Bounty Killer and long-term rival Beenie Man put aside their differences and recorded a single together, "Legendary". The two performed a well-received Verzuz battle together on Instagram during the COVID-19 pandemic quarantine on 23 May 2020.

Bounty revealed as of June 2020, he had a new album in the works with Damian Marley as the executive producer.

=== Personal life ===
Price was arrested twice at the annual Reggae Sumfest: he was arrested but not charged in a 2001 altercation with another performer, and arrested and charged in 2008 for using profanity during his performance. He was also arrested on 3 February 2009, after allegedly running seven traffic lights in Kingston, Jamaica, and charged with refusal to take a breathalyzer test and disobeying red lights.

Price was arrested by police in June 2006, and charged with assaulting the mother of his child. According to the Jamaica Star, "The complainant was allegedly punched in the face several times, dragged some distance away and her head slammed into a wall."

=== Foundation ===
In 2018, Price started a charity called the Bounty Killer Foundation with a series of donations to the Kingston Public Hospital in Jamaica which he said had treated his gun shot wound in 1986. In 2020, Price through his foundation made a cash donation to Jamaican reggae singer Junior Byles, who suffered from mental illness and cancer.

== Discography ==
=== Albums ===
- Roots, Reality & Culture (VP Records) (1994)
- Jamaica’s Most Wanted (Greensleeves Records) (1994)
- Guns Out (Greensleeves Records) (1994)
- Face to Face (VP Records) (1994)
- Down in the Ghetto (Greensleeves Records) (1994)
- No Argument (Greensleeves Records) (1995)
- My Xperience (VP Records/TVT Records) (1996)
- Ghetto Gramma (Greensleeves Records) (1997)
- Next Millennium (VP Records/TVT Records) (1998)
- 5th Element (VP Records) (1999)
- Ghetto Dictionary – The Mystery (VP Records) (2002)
- Ghetto Dictionary – The Art of War (VP Records) (2002)
- Nah No Mercy – The Warlord Scrolls (VP Records) (2006)

=== Riddim Album features ===
Bounty Killer has singles featured on more than 500 various riddim/rhythm album productions worldwide throughout his reggae dancehall music career spanning from the early 1990s to present day.

=== EPs ===
- Raise Hell on Hellboy (PayDay Music Group) (2009)
- Summertime – Bounty Killer (Feat. Patexx) (Syndicate Records) (2010)
- Summertime – Buss Out Remix (Bounty Killer Feat. Busta Rhymes & Patexx) (Syndicate Records) (2011)

==== US singles ====
Year	Title	Chart Positions		Album
Year	Title	Billboard Hot 100	US R&B/Hip-Hop	Album
1994	"You Don't Love Me (No, No, No) (World of Respect '94 Mix)" (featuring Dawn Penn, Dennis Brown and Ken Boothe)	58	42	Come Again
1996	"Change Like the Weather" (featuring Junior Reid and Busta Rhymes)	58	42	My Xperience
1997	"Hip-Hopera" (feat. Fugees)	81	54	My Xperience
1998	"Deadly Zone" (feat. Mobb Deep and Big Noyd)	79	48	Next Millennium and Blade soundtrack
2001	"Hey Baby" (No Doubt feat. Bounty Killer)	5	–	Rock Steady
2002	"Guilty" (Swizz Beatz feat. Bounty Killer)	–	104	Presents G.H.E.T.T.O. Stories
2005	"P.S.A. B.K. 2004" (feat. Jay-Z)	–	75	N/A
2015	"Bitch Better Have My Money (Don Corleon Dancehall Remix)" (with Rihanna and Beenie Man)	–	–	N/A
